= Martin Lorentzon =

Swedish entrepreneur

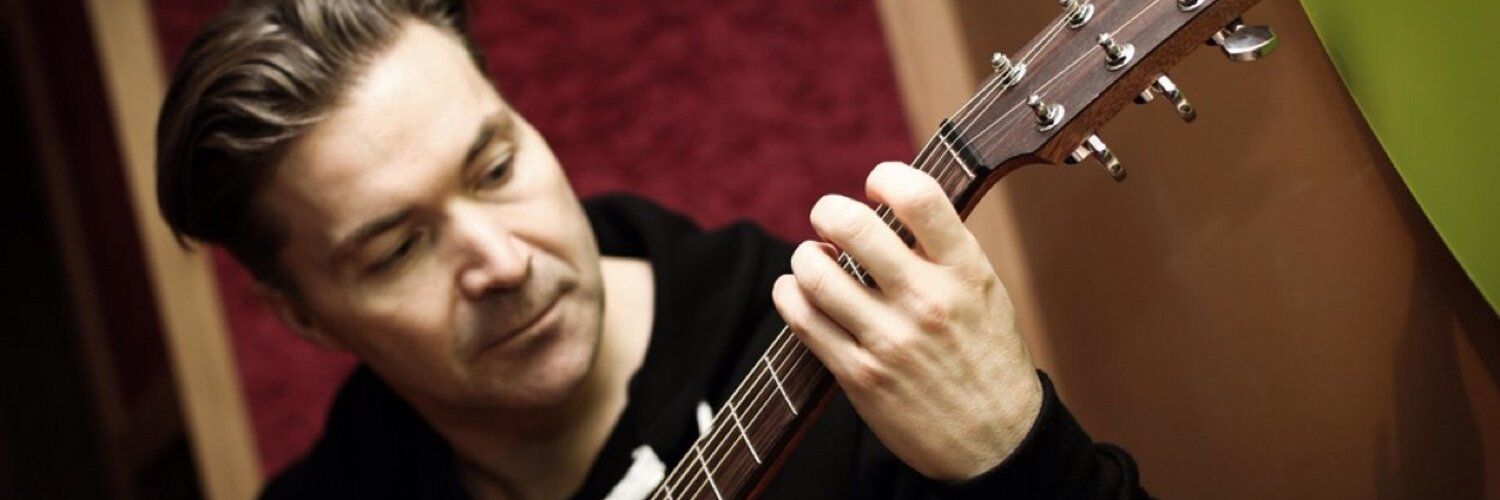
- Martin Lorentzon with a guitar
- Born: 1 April 1969 (age 57); Marieholm, Småland, Sweden
- Education: Chalmers University of Technology
- Occupation: Entrepreneur
- Known for: Co-founder of Tradedoubler and Spotify
- Board member of: Spotify

Sven Hans Martin Lorentzon (pronounced [ˈmǎʈːɪn ˈlôːrɛnˌsɔn]; born 1 April 1969) is a Swedish entrepreneur and co-founder of Tradedoubler and Spotify. From 2013 to 2018 he was on the board of Telia Company. Since April 2019, he has been an expert on Sweden's immigrants' integration issues for the Moderate Party commission New Swedish Model.

== Early life ==
Lorentzon was born on 1 April 1969 in the south of Sweden in the village of Åsenhöga, in the Gnosjö region of Småland province. In February 1970, his family moved to Borås, and he grew up in the Hestra quarter. His mother, Brita (born 21 September 1936), worked as a teacher, and his father, Sven, (born 1 July 1932) was an economist. Lorentzon has two older siblings. He is a graduate of the Chalmers University of Technology in Gothenburg.

== Career ==
As a student at the Särlaskolan primary school in Borås, Lorentzon told classmates that he wanted to sell one matchbox to every Chinese person and become a billionaire. For high school he attended the technical department of Sven Eriksonsgymnasiet, where he liked to go to parties but always put education first: if there was a party before a test he would lie that he was sick and would have to stay home.

In 1990, Lorentzon began his studies at the Chalmers University of Technology where he studied industrial economics and later finished with a Master of Science and engineering degree. He attended economics courses at the Gothenburg School of Business, Economics and Law. Lorentzon also studied economics at the Stockholm School of Economics and took courses in rhetoric and argumentation at Stockholm University.

In 1995, Lorentzon started an internship at the Swedish telephone incumbent, Telia. He moved to San Francisco and worked in the AltaVista office there. In Silicon Valley he met skilled web entrepreneurs and found a job at an investment company called Cell Ventures, where he met Felix Hagnö, the son of the owners of a Swedish clothing line called Joy. In September 1999, Lorentzon and Hagnö founded Netstrategy, which would later become the leading European marketplace Tradedoubler. The company soon became commercially profitable and socially acclaimed; in 2001, it won the Swedish Guldmusen prize for "IT-rookie of the Year", the Swedish Trade Council in the United Kingdom prize "Achievement Award" in 2002 for Swedish companies that have been the most successful in the UK over the past year, and the Swedish "Export Hermes" prize in 2004 for the best Swedish exporting company. Lorentzon then moved to Germany. Web sales peaked and in 2005 he sold his Tradedoubler option for US$70 million. Lorentzon then moved back to Sweden after ten years abroad. In March 2006 Tradedoubler bought advertising service Advertigo, created by Daniel Ek. Ek and Lorentzon quickly became friends, finding that they had common experiences of depression because of unexpected wealth and a lack of purpose.

From April 2013 to March 2018, Lorentzon was a member of the board of directors at Telia, and owned 230,000 shares.

=== Spotify ===
In April 2006, Ek and Lorentzon decided to start a new company. Lorentzon left the board of Tradedoubler and gave one million euros to Ek. In June 2006 Spotify was registered. Spotify was started as a music streaming service earning its profits from online advertising, a business that they both knew very well.

Lorentzon spent his own money on developers' salaries, offices, and renting music licenses. They tried to attract investor money, but Lorentzon was not satisfied with the terms with which they were offered to cooperate. Because of these unplanned expenses, Lorentzon's share in Spotify turned out to be the largest. His option was estimated at more than US$4 billion; he holds 43.3% voting rights and owns 12.7% shares. Hagnö decided to join in his former colleague's venture, and owns 6.6% of the shares worth US$1.5 billion.

Lorentzon was chief executive officer from 2006 to 2013 and chairman of board of directors from 2008 to 2016, until Ek took over these roles. In interviews Ek and Lorentzon claim that they are best friends and there has not been a day since 2006 when they did not speak at least once a day. Lorentzon is responsible for developing the company's future goals and development strategy, budget, salaries, verification of legal and annual financial reports.

== Civic involvement ==
In 2013, Lorentzon joined Prince Daniel's Fellowship Project, and visits upper secondary schools, universities, and university colleges around Sweden to inspire young people to get involved in entrepreneurship. In 2016, he was elected as a member of the Royal Swedish Academy of Engineering Sciences under the Department of Education and Research, which promotes contact and exchange between business, research, and government entities.

In 2014, Lorentzon was named International Swede of the Year, and in 2015, he was awarded the Affärsbragden (The Business Achievement) from the newspaper Svenska Dagbladet. In the spring of 2015, Lorentzon was given an honorary doctorate at the Chalmers University of Technology.

== Politics ==
Lorentzon and his fellow Spotify cofounder Ek have advocated for lowering taxes in Sweden, which are some of the highest in the world, and for less restrictive permitting policies. In 2016, they wrote an open letter to the Swedish government arguing that if changes to Swedish law regarding housing, taxation, and education are not made, Spotify will be forced to relocate from the country. They asserted that high taxes on stock options in Sweden make it difficult to incentivize programmers to work at startups while competing with larger companies on salary. They also wrote that Swedish permitting policy is overly restrictive, limiting the supply of affordable housing in the country.

In April 2019, Lorentzon was tasked as an immigrants' integration issues expert in a Moderate Party commission New Swedish Model created by Ulf Kristersson before the 2022 Swedish general election which resulted in Kristersson becoming prime minister.

== Personal life ==
He has lived in Vasastan, Stockholm, since 2005. He also owns an apartment in the ski resort community of Åre. In 2006, he paid 1.4 million euro in taxes.

== Awards ==
- 2014 - International Swede of the Year (along with Daniel Ek)
- 2015 - Affärsbragden (The Business Achievement), Svenska Dagbladet
- 2015 - Honorary doctorate, Chalmers University of Technology
- 2016 - Elected as member of the Royal Swedish Academy of Engineering Sciences (Department of Education and Research)
- 2020 - H. M. The King's Medal (12th size gold, silver-gilt)
- 2021 - Gustaf Dalén Medal
