= Gnosjö Municipality =

Gnosjö Municipality Gnosjö kommun
- Municipality
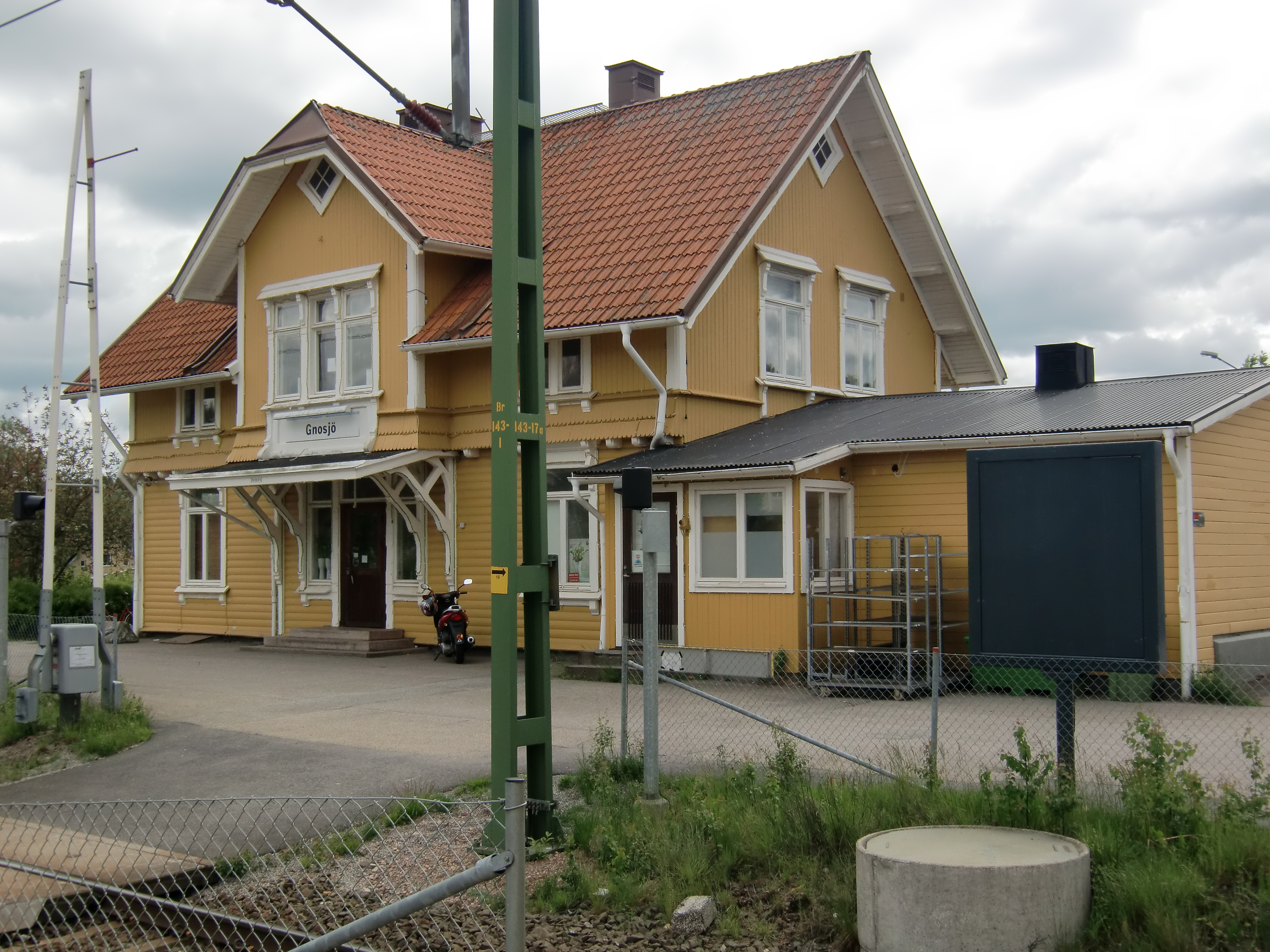
- Gnosjö Railway Station

- Coat of arms

- Coordinates: 57°22′N 13°44′E
- Country: Sweden
- County: Jönköping County
- Seat: Gnosjö

Government
  - Mayor: Kristine Hästmark (M)

Area
  - Total: 450.05 km^{2} (173.77 sq mi)
  - Land: 420.58 km^{2} (162.39 sq mi)
  - Water: 29.47 km^{2} (11.38 sq mi)
- Area as of 1 January 2014.

Population (30 June 2025)
  - Total: 9,097
  - Density: 21.63/km^{2} (56.02/sq mi)
- Time zone: UTC+1 (CET)
  - Summer (DST): UTC+2 (CEST)
- ISO 3166 code: SE
- Province: Småland
- Municipal code: 0617
- Website: www.gnosjo.se

Gnosjö Municipality (Swedish: Gnosjö kommun) is a municipality in Jönköping County, southern Sweden where the town Gnosjö is seat.

The Swedish local government reform of 1952 formed this municipality out if five former entities, and it has not been amalgamated with others since then.

About half of the municipal population live in Gnosjö town, the rest is spread between smaller localities, and rural areas.

Gnosjö is referred to as the centre of the Gnosjö region which is an area of enterprising small industries, driven by the distinctive "Gnosjö Spirit". Despite its small size of some 1,100 people at the time, it had been the subject of a book describing its customs and locals in 1906 (F.J.E. Eneström: Gnosjöboarna, deras hemslöjd, seder och lefnadssätt).

The landscape is dominated by forests. The rural areas offer good possibilities for wildlife, canoeing, fishing, hiking, etc. The Store Mosse is a national park consisting of the largest boggy ground (in Sweden) south of Lapland.

Near Hillerstorp is a small but nationally renowned amusement park called High Chaparral offering Wild West experiences. There is, in Gnosjö town, a small museum of the local industrial history, in this case a mechanical workshop. Fabriksrundan is the largest festival-style event in the area.

== Localities ==
There are seven urban areas (also called localities, Swedish: tätorter) in Gnosjö Municipality.

In the table the localities are listed according to the size of the population as of December 31, 2005. The municipal seat is in bold characters.

#	Locality	Population
1	**Gnosjö**	6,364
2	Hillerstorp	1,806
3	Kulltorp	327
4	Nissafors	313
5	Törestorp	233
6	Marieholm	218
7	Åsenhöga	200

== Demographics ==
This is a demographic table based on Gnosjö Municipality's electoral districts in the 2022 Swedish general election sourced from SVT's election platform, in turn taken from SCB official statistics.

In total there were 8,560 inhabitants, including 6,831 Swedish citizens of voting age. 36.1% voted for the left coalition and 63.2% for the right coalition.

Location	Residents	Citizen adults	Left vote	Right vote	Employed	Swedish parents	Foreign heritage	Income SEK	Degree
Location			%	%					
Gnosjö N	1,248	883	38.4	60.9	84	65	35	26,584	25
Gnosjö V	2,103	1,428	41.4	57.2	77	49	51	23,871	23
Gnosjö Ö	1,571	1,213	33.6	66.0	88	69	31	25,750	25
Kulltorp	1,189	854	24.9	74.2	89	84	16	27,257	21
Kävsjö	2,067	1,452	38.7	60.9	83	62	38	25,899	25
Åsenhöga-Källeryd	1,382	1,001	36.7	62.8	86	81	19	26,637	31
Source: SVT

== Fabriksrundan ==
Fabriksrundan
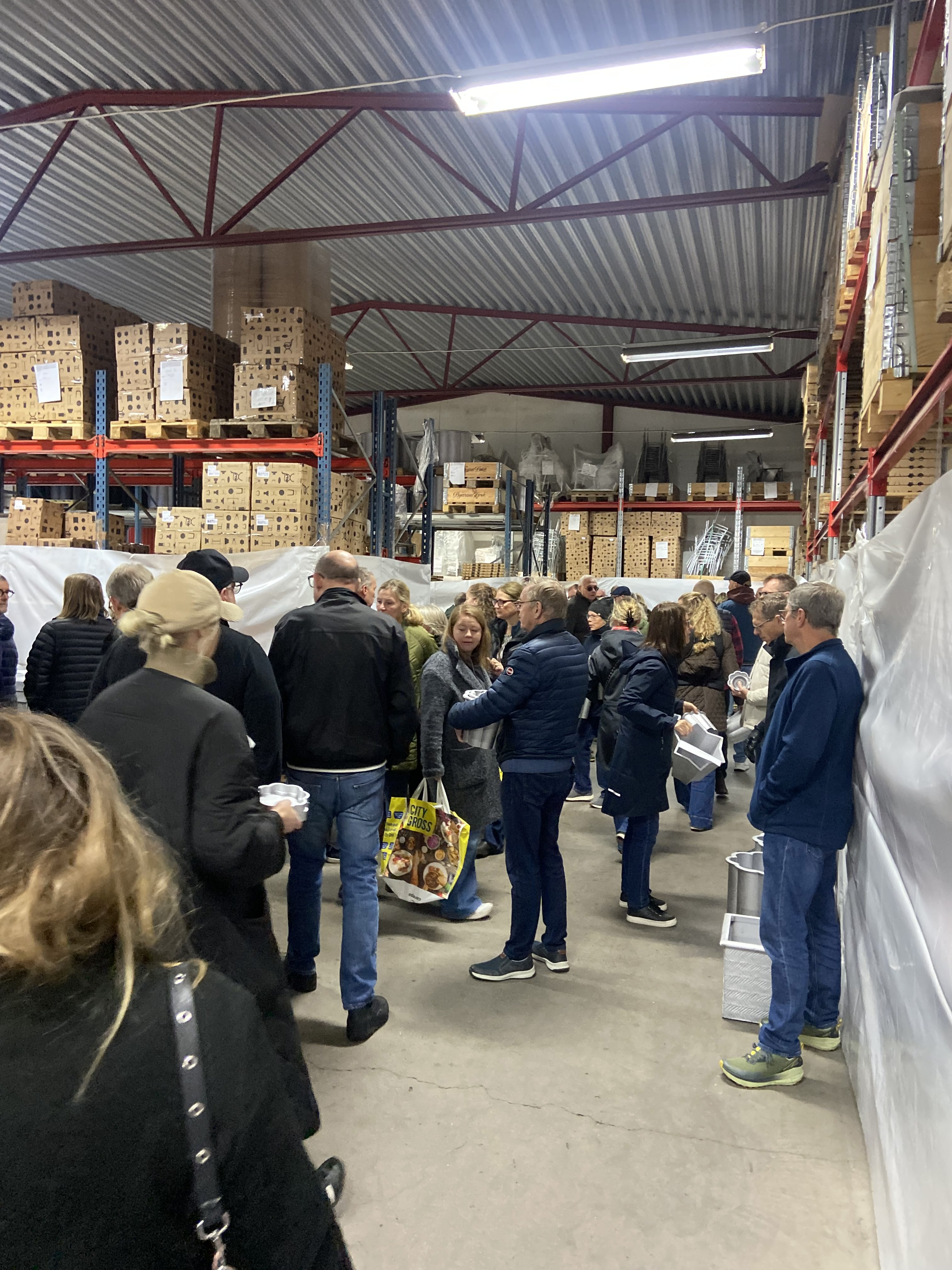
- Fabriksrundan (2025) factory tour at one of 50 participating companies
- Date: Second weekend in October
- Frequency: Annually
- Location: Gnosjö municipality
- Country: Sweden
- Years active: 3
- Inaugurated: 2023
- Participants: 52 manufacturing companies (2025)
- Website: official website

Fabriksrundan is an annual event in the municipality, where local manufacturing companies open their doors to the public, arrange factory tours and offer factory sales. It is a multiday event that typically takes place during the second weekend in October.

Fabriksrundan was first held in 2023, with 28 participating companies from the municipalities of Värnamo, Gislaved, and Gnosjö. The following year, companies from Vaggeryd also participated, bringing the total number of companies to 42. In 2025, 52 companies took part in the event.

In 2025, Fabriksrundan was nominated for the Stora Turismpriset (Grand Tourism Prize) by Smålands Turism.
