= Massive Luxury Overdose =

Studio album by Army of Lovers
- Released: August 26, 1991; March 13, 1992
- Genres: Europop; eurodance; eurohouse; eurodisco
- Length: 41:37
- Labels: Ton Son Ton; Stockholm (1992)
- Producers: Alexander Bard; Anders Wollbeck; Per Adebratt; Emil Hellman; Ola Håkansson (also exec.); Anders Hansson; Tim Norell

Army of Lovers chronology
Disco Extravaganza (1990)	Massive Luxury Overdose (1991)	The Gods of Earth and Heaven (1993)

Singles from Massive Luxury Overdose
- 1. "Crucified" Released: May 1991; 2. "Obsession" Released: September 1991; 3. "Candyman Messiah" Released: November 1991; 4. "Ride the Bullet (re-release)" Released: January 1992; 5. "Judgment Day" Released: June 1992

Alternative Cover
- 1992 cover

Professional ratings
Review scores
Source	Rating
AllMusic	4/5 stars
Encyclopedia of Popular Music	3/5 stars
NME	(favorable)

Massive Luxury Overdose is the second studio album by Swedish pop group Army of Lovers. It was originally released in 1991, and a reissue of the album with altered track listing was released in 1992. It contains the band's biggest hits, including "Obsession", and "Crucified". The original version of the album also includes three songs from their first album Disco Extravaganza (1990), which are not included on the reissued version.

== Background ==
When La Camilla left the band in 1991, she was replaced by Michaela Dornonville de la Cour. For the second release in 1992, the band recorded four new songs and reissued the album with a new cover, introducing de la Cour.

Army of Lovers made their first tour in March 1992 and at that time the album had already sold over 500,000 copies. The tour began in Sweden, at High Chaparral in Kulltorp, and after several Swedish cities the tour continued throughout Europe.

== Critical reception ==
AllMusic editor Neil Raggett wrote, "Some album titles do nail it, and this is one of the prime candidates." "Crucified" was named the "most memorable number", "a totally over-the-top disco anthem on all fronts". He also mentioned the "half-twinky, half-ominous" "Candyman Messiah" and "Say Goodbye to Babylon", which are "taking religious imagery and tweaking it for all it's worth". David A. Keeps from Austin American Statesman felt the album is "audacious in its appropriations". He added; "We Stand United" is "a rote re-creation of Chic's classic disco", "Say Goodbye to Babylon" "blends Theme from Midnight Express into massive hallelujah choruses suitable for Andrew Lloyd Webber", "I Cross the Rubicon" has "a piano bass line [that] thunders beneath cymbals, horn crescendos, whispered male vocals and soul diva whoops", "Walking with a Zombie" "fuses boulevardier accordion with an insistent Latin beat", and "Crucified" is "steeped in romantic and biblical imagery that suggests, in a typically broad camp stroke, that obsessive love is the most religious experience of all."

American magazine Billboard constated that the "campy Swedish trio continues to reverently pilfer through '70s-era disco and '80s-style hi-NRG on this glittery sophomore outing." They highlighted the "bombastic" "Dynasty of Planet Chromada" and the "swin-vibed" "Say Goodbye to Babylon", and concluded, "Melodramatic dance/pop that should make acts like Pet Shop Boys green with envy." NME said, "A great record, proper disco style dance music and packed full of cultural surprises." Joe Brown from The Washington Post wrote that here, "the Army presents its unapologetic, exuberant Eurodisco as if house never happened." He felt that on tracks like "Crucified" and "Dynasty of Planet Chromada", "the Army reveals a lyrical obsession with a millenarian-apocalyptic- sacrilege thang, and La Camilla's kitschy cooing includes imitations of Grace Jones and Debbie Harry."

== Commercial performance ==
In Sweden, Massive Luxury Overdose sold about 70,000 copies, and worldwide the album sold at least 2 million copies.

== Track listing ==
Standard edition
No.	Title	Writer(s)	Length
1.	"We Stand United"	Alexander Bard; Anders Wollbeck; Jean-Pierre Barda; Camilla Henemark	3:44
2.	"Crucified"	Bard; Wollbeck; Barda	3:32
3.	"Candyman Messiah"	Bard; Wollbeck; Barda; Henemark	3:24
4.	"Obsession"	Bard; Wollbeck	3:39
5.	"I Cross the Rubicon"	Bard; Wollbeck; Barda	4:01
6.	"Supernatural (1991 remix)"	Bard; Magnus Frykberg; Emil Hellman; Leif Jacobsson	3:54
7.	"Ride the Bullet (1991 remix)"	Bard; Wollbeck; Barda; Henemark; Hellman	3:42
8.	"Say Goodbye to Babylon"	Bard; Wollbeck; Barda	4:26
9.	"Flying High"	Bard; Wollbeck; Barda; Henemark	3:39
10.	"Walking with a Zombie"	Bard; Wollbeck; Barda	4:09
11.	"My Army of Lovers"	Bard; Tim Norell; Ola Håkansson; Anders Hansson; Peo Tyrèn	3:27
Total length:			41:37

1992 reissue
No.	Title	Writer(s)	Length
1.	"Dynasty of Planet Chromada"	Bard; Wollbeck; Barda	3:54
2.	"Crucified"	Bard; Wollbeck; Barda	3:32
3.	"Candyman Messiah"	Bard; Wollbeck; Barda; Henemark	3:24
4.	"Obsession"	Bard; Wollbeck	3:39
5.	"We Stand United"	Bard; Wollbeck; Barda; Henemark	3:44
6.	"Say Goodbye to Babylon"	Bard; Wollbeck; Barda	4:26
7.	"Ride the Bullet"	Bard; Wollbeck; Barda; Henemark; Hellman	3:27
8.	"The Particle Song"	Bard; Wollbeck; Barda	3:26
9.	"Someone Somewhere"	Bard; Wollbeck	3:18
10.	"I Cross the Rubicon"	Bard; Wollbeck; Barda	4:01
11.	"Flying High"	Bard; Wollbeck; Barda; Henemark	3:39
12.	"Walking with a Zombie"	Bard; Wollbeck; Barda	4:09
13.	"Judgement Day"	Bard; Wollbeck; Barda; Michaela de la Cour	3:58
Total length:			48:37

Note

- Track 7, "Ride the Bullet", was not included on copies of the 1992 reissue in the United States.

== Personnel ==
- Erika Essen-Möller, Jean-Paul Wall, Katarina Wilczewski, Malin Bäckström, Richard Evenlind – backing vocals
- Per Adebratt – co-producer (tracks 1–6, 8–10), engineer (tracks 1–10), mixing (tracks 1–10)
- Anders Wollbeck – guitar (tracks 1, 5, 7, 10), keyboards (tracks 1–10), producer (tracks 1–10), programming (tracks 1–10)
- André Ferrari – percussion (tracks 1, 4, 5, 10)
- Alexander Bard – producer (tracks 1–10)
- Anders Gustavson – saxophone (tracks 1, 5, 8, 10)

== Charts ==
Chart performance for Massive Luxury Overdose
Chart (1991–92)	Peak position
Australian Albums (ARIA)	126
Austrian Albums (Ö3 Austria)	7
Finnish Albums (Suomen virallinen lista)	28
German Albums (Offizielle Top 100)	13
Swedish Albums (Sverigetopplistan)	9
Swiss Albums (Schweizer Hitparade)	21

== Sales and certifications ==
Region	Certification	Certified units/sales
Sweden (GLF)	Platinum	100,000^{^}
^{^} Shipments figures based on certification alone.
