= Thule Group =

Swedish company

Thule Group AB

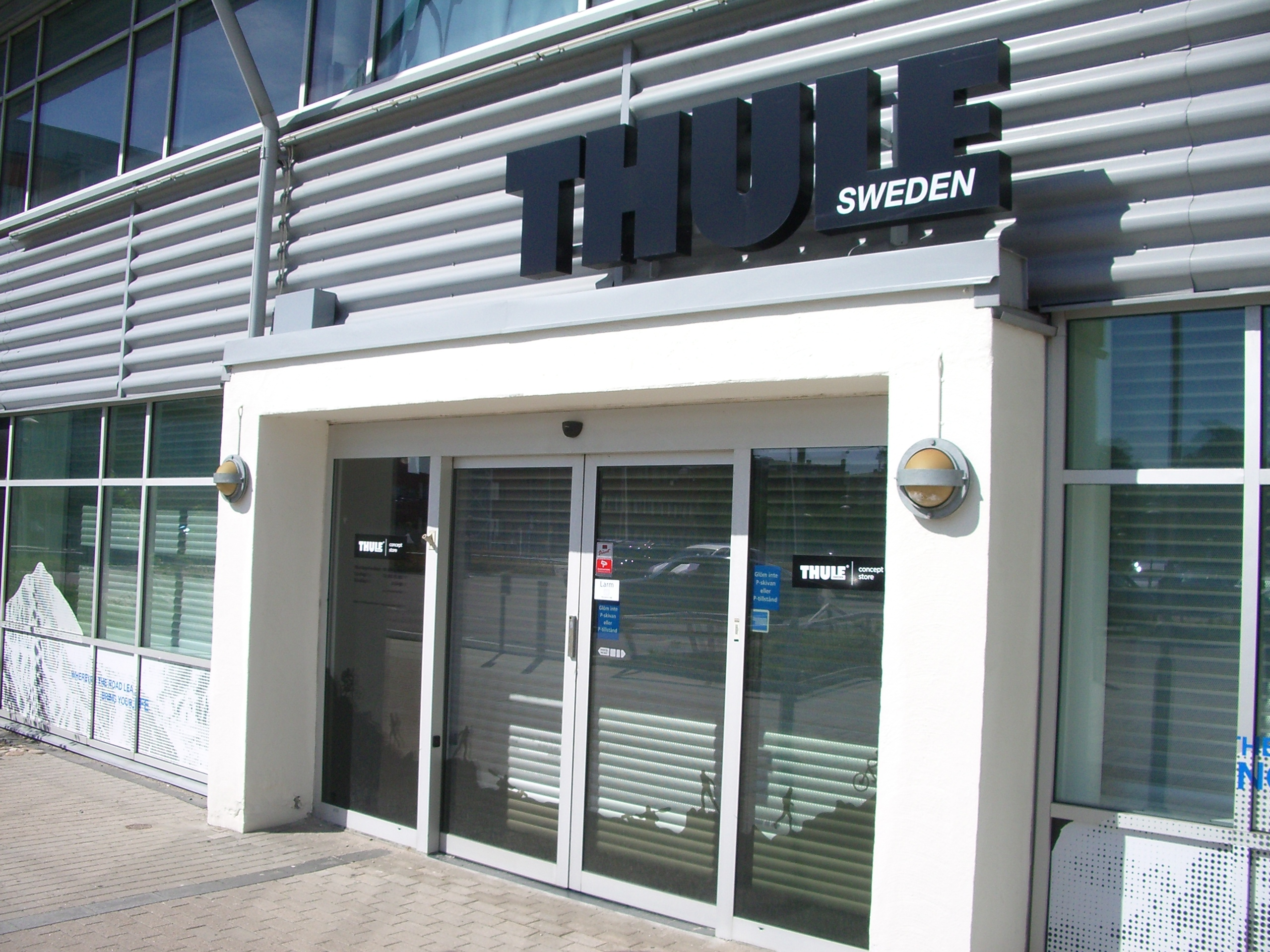
- Thule Concept Store in Malmö, Sweden
- Type: Aktiebolag
- Traded as: Nasdaq Stockholm: THULE
- Industry: Consumer goods
- Founded: Hillerstorp, Småland, Sweden (1942; 84 years ago)
- Headquarters: Malmö, Sweden
- Area served: Worldwide
- Key people: Bengt Baron (Board Member)
- Products: Car roof boxes, roof racks, bike racks, laptop and camera bags and backpacks
- Revenue: SEK 5,320 million (2015)
- Operating income: SEK 825 million (2015)
- Net income: SEK 587 million (2015)
- Total assets: SEK 6,899 million (2015)
- Total equity: SEK 3,228 million (2015)
- Number of employees: 2,200 (September 2014)
- Website: ThuleGroup.com; Thule.com

Logo of the Thule brand

Thule Group AB (/ˈtuːliː/) is a Swedish company that owns brands related to outdoor and transportation products. These include cargo carriers for automobiles and other outdoor and storage products, with 4,700 points of sale in 136 countries worldwide.

== History ==
Thule was founded in 1942 in Hillerstorp, southern Sweden. The company grew steadily, especially in the 1960s when Thule specialized in roof racks and other automobile accessories, helping car owners bring their outdoor equipment and luggage. In 1979, Eldon, a company listed on the Stockholm Stock Exchange, purchased Thule and continued to develop the company. In 1999, the private equity firm EQT Corporation acquired and delisted Eldon. In 2004, EQT sold Thule to the UK-based private equity firm Candover, which embarked on several mergers and acquisitions, growing the turnover more than three times and adding new product lines such as towbars, car trailers, snow chains, RV products and bags for electronic devices.

In May 2007, Nordic Capital acquired Thule but restructured in December 2008 due to the 2008 financial crisis, resulting in the lending bank consortium receiving an equity stake in the company. Nordic Capital acquired the remainder of the company in December 2010 and listed Thule on the Stockholm Stock Exchange in November 2014 through an IPO.

In November 2024, Thule acquired Australian company Quad Lock for A$500 million.

== Products ==
Thule is the largest and most well-known of the brands that make up the group. The Thule product line includes everything from car roof boxes, bike racks, roof racks and strollers to laptop and camera bags, tablet and mobile phone cases, backpacks, luggage and rooftop tents. The other brands that form the Thule Group brand portfolio are the US-founded cover and bag company Case Logic, SportRack Inc., the Canadian brand Chariot, the Dutch company Yepp and the Californian company Tepui.

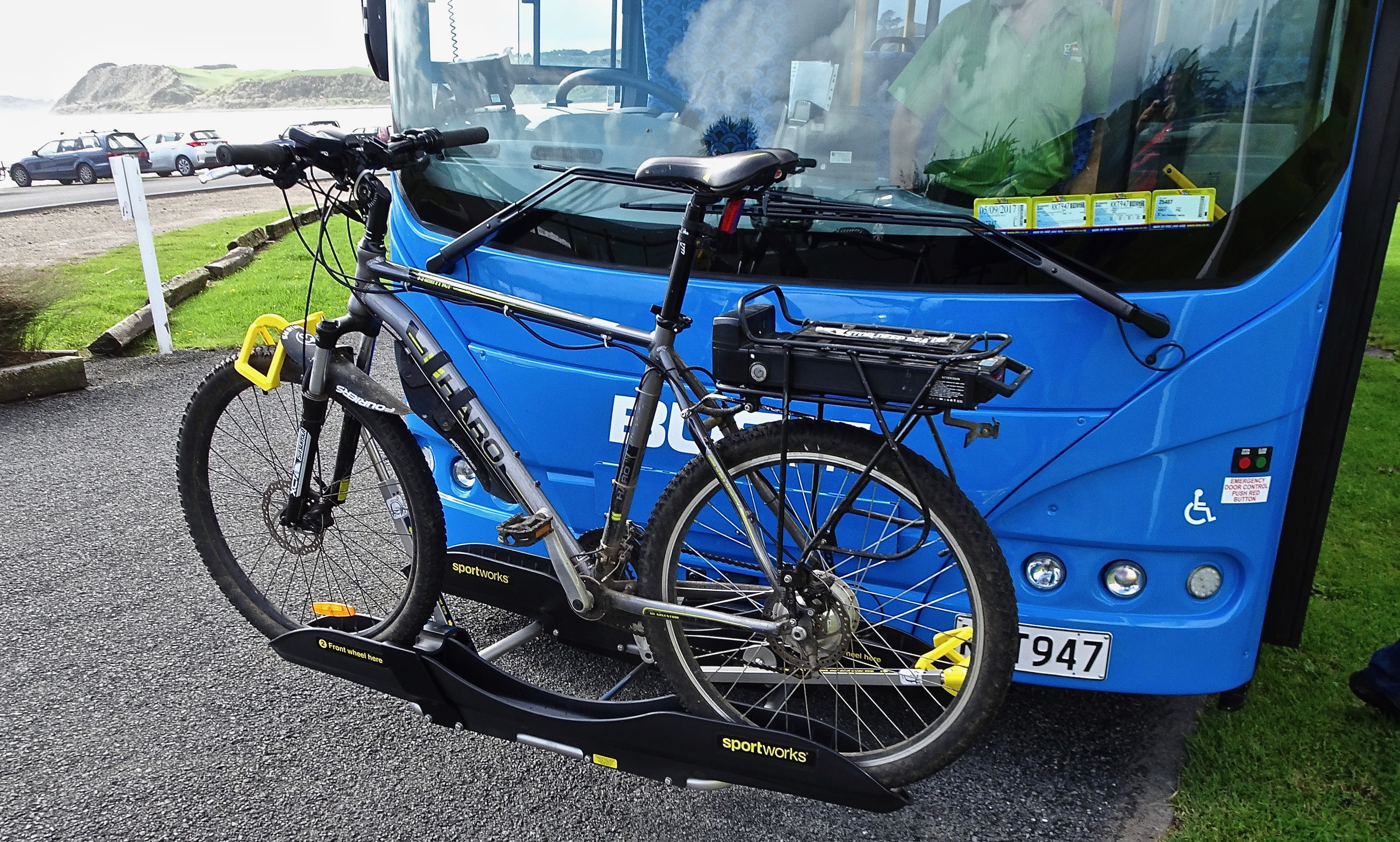
Sportworks bike rack on a Volvo B7RLE GoBus in 2017

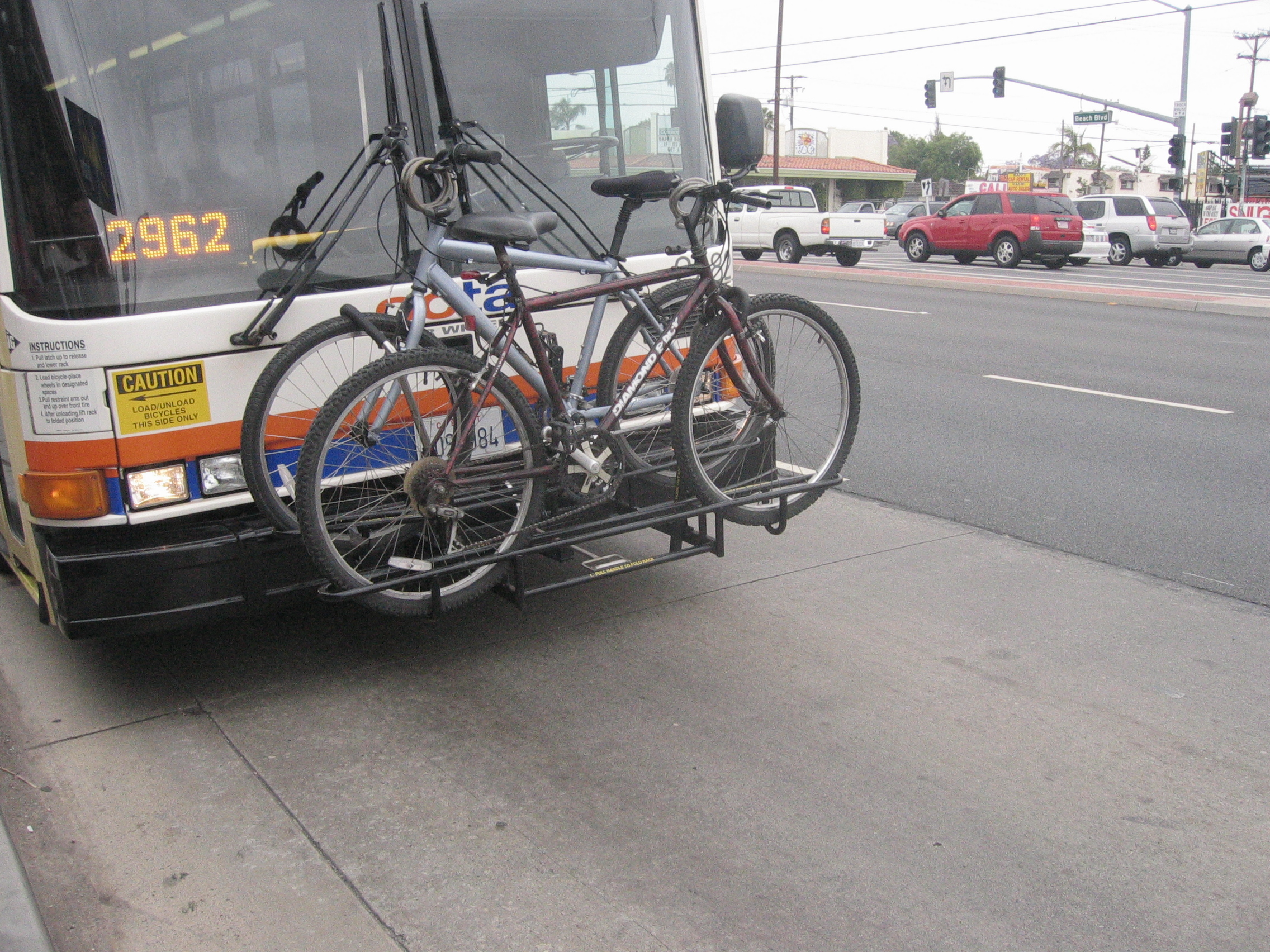
Bus with patented bicycle carrier in use

== Timeline ==
- 1962 – Introduction of Thule sport and cargo carriers
- 2004 – Acquisition of König (snow chains)
- 2005 – Acquisition of Omnistor (RV products), rebranded Thule 2009
- 2005 – Acquisition of Sportworks car rack product line
- 2007 – Acquisition of Case Logic (bags for electronic devices), premium line rebranded Thule 2010
- 2007 – Acquisition of UWS (work gear)
- 2011 – Acquisition of Chariot Carriers, rebranded Thule in 2013
- 2011 – Opening of Thule Store near Mobilia shopping center in Malmö, on the premises that previously housed the old stocking factory Malmö Strumpfabrik.
- 2013 – Introduction of Thule sport and travel bags
- 2014 – The towbar and trailer businesses are divested
- 2015 – The snow chain business (König) is divested
- 2016 – Acquisition of GMG B.V. (Yepp child bike seats)
- 2017 – UWS is divested
- 2018 (Feb) – Opening of Thule Store in Stockholm
- 2018 (Dec) – Acquisition of the North American rooftop tents company Tepui Outdoors Inc.
- 2024 (Nov) – Acquisition of Quadlock - an Australian mobile phone attachment maker

== Corporate social responsibility ==
Thule Group has an annual tradition of donating backpacks and school supplies to the children of Casa de la Esperanza, a housing program for migrant farm workers and their families in the United States. Since 2010, Thule Group has been the main sponsor of RBU, Sweden's National Association for Disabled Children and Adolescents.
