= Morgan Nilsson =

Swedish footballer

Personal information
- Full name: Jens Morgan Nilsson
- Date of birth: 3 April 1971 (age 55)
- Place of birth: Gnosjö, Sweden
- Height: 1.78 m (5 ft 10 in)
- Position: Midfielder

Senior career*
| Years | Team | Apps | (Gls) |
| 1987–1990 | Gnosjö IF | 52 | (0) |
| 1990–1993 | GAIS | 79 | (8) |
| 1993–2003 | Örgryte IS | 201 | (10) |
| 2003 | GAIS | 15 | (0) |
| 2006 | Lindome GIF | | |

International career^{‡}
| 1998 | Sweden | 3 | (0) |
- * Club domestic league appearances and goals as of 26 October 2017 (UTC) ‡ National team caps and goals as of 26 October (UTC)

Jens Morgan Nilsson (born 3 April 1971) is a Swedish former footballer who played as a midfielder. During his club career, Nilsson played for Gnosjö IF, GAIS, Örgryte IS, and Lindome GIF. He made three appearances for the Sweden national team.

== Honours ==
Svenska Cupen: 1999-2000
