= Marieholm =

Marieholm may refer to:

- Marieholm, Eslöv, locality in Eslöv Municipality, Sweden
- Marieholm, Gnosjö, locality in Gnosjö Municipality, Sweden
- Marieholms Bruk, shipyard in Småland, Sweden
