= Svetlana! =

2025 single by Nextime

Single by Nextime

from the album Brilliantovyy al'bom
- Language: Russian
- Released: November 21, 2025
- Genre: Pop, Dance-pop, Electronic, Hip-hop
- Length: 1:36
- Label: VHQ Music
- Songwriter: Arif Oktayevich Miraliyev
- Composer: Farit Nagaev

Nextime singles chronology
"Zachem?" (2025)	"Svetlana!" (2025)	"AntiSvetlana" (2025)

Music video
- "Svetlana" on YouTube

"Svetlana!" (Russian: Светлана!) (stylized in uppercase) is a song by Russian rapper Nextime. It was released through Russian label VHQ Music on November 21, 2025. It peaked at number six at Russian Streaming Chart. Outside of Russia, it peaked at number two at Latvian Streaming Chart and within top sixty of the streaming charts in Czech Republic and Slovakia, and in a combined chart in Lithuania.

== Background ==
Before its official release, a snippet of the song went viral on TikTok, generating over 57,000 videos.

== Lyrics ==
According to Aleksandra Kravchenko of the Russian edition of Psychologies, the song depicts a conventional rap narrative centered on a brief encounter in a nightclub that leads to disappointment. She interprets the lyrics as expressing male frustration and a perceived loss of control, noting their emphasis on self-confidence and dominance. Kravchenko also observes that the female character is not given a voice or the opportunity to explain her actions. Although the song refers to a particular woman, she suggests that its lyrics may be understood as a generalized portrayal of women in club culture rather than a depiction of a specific individual.

== Critical reception ==
In a review published by the Russian news agency InterMedia, music critics John Kalligan and Aleksey Mazhayev noted the song’s explicit language. Kalligan shared an alternative interpretation, suggesting that the lyrics could be read as deliberately exaggerated and self-ironic, potentially functioning as a postmodern parody of contemporary rap conventions rather than a straightforward expression of vulgarity.

== Controversy ==
The song has been met with some criticism, suggesting that it contains words that could be interpreted as stigmatizing towards women. Some have argued that if a similar song were directed toward men, the artist would not face harsh criticism and would not be canceled.

== Commercial performance ==
In Russia, a week after the songs release it immediately debuted at number 15 on the TopHit's Russian streaming chart, published on 27 November, and was the highest new entry on the chart that week. One week later, the song managed to reach number 6, and remained in that place for another two weeks, dated respectively December 12 and 19.

In Czech Republic, the song debuted at number 62 on ČNS IFPI's Czech Singles Digitál Top 100, at the week dated 8 December. It eventually peaked there at number 43, at the weeks dated 15 and 22 December.

In Latvia, the song week after its release immediately debuted at number 15 on LaIPA's Streaming Chart, published on 2 December. One week later, it peaked there at number 2, at the week dated 9 December, and remained in that place for week, dated 16 December.

In Lithuania, the song debuted at number 42 on AGATA's Lithuanian Combined Chart, dated 5 December. It eventually peaked there at number 36, at the chart dated 19 December.

In Slovakia, the song debuted at number 69 on ČNS IFPI's Slovak Singles Digitál Top 100, at the week dated 8 December. It eventually peaked there at number 36, at the weeks dated 15 and 22 December.

== Music video ==
On 5 January 2026, the official music video premiered on the artist's YouTube channel.

== Charts ==
=== Weekly charts ===
Weekly chart performance
Chart (2025)	Peak position
Czech Republic Singles Digital (ČNS IFPI)	43
Latvia Streaming (LaIPA)	2
Lithuania (AGATA)	36
Russia Streaming (TopHit)	6
Slovakia Singles Digital (ČNS IFPI)	51

=== Monthly charts ===
Monthly chart performance
Chart (2025)	Peak position
Russia Streaming (TopHit)	5

=== Year-end charts ===
Year-end chart performance
Chart (2025)	Position
Russia Streaming (TopHit)	114
