= PictoImage =

2007 Nintendo DS video game

- Developer(s): Skonec
- Publisher(s): Sega
- Platform(s): Nintendo DS
- Release: JP: September 27, 2007; NA: September 2, 2008; EU: September 12, 2008; AU: September 18, 2008
- Genre(s): Puzzle
- Mode(s): Single-player, multiplayer

PictoImage, known in Japan as Picto Image DS (ピクトイメージDS, Pikuto Imēji DS), is a puzzle video game developed by Skonec and published by Sega for Nintendo DS in 2007–2008.

== Reception ==
Reception

Aggregate score
| Aggregator | Score |
|---|---|
| Metacritic | 61/100 |

Review scores
| Publication | Score |
|---|---|
| 1Up.com | B |
| Eurogamer | 5/10 |
| Gamekult | 3/10 |
| Jeuxvideo.com | 13/20 |
| Nintendo Life | 5/10 |
| Pocket Gamer | 3/5 |

The game received "mixed" reviews according to the review aggregation website Metacritic.
