= Gamekult =

French video game website

- Website type: Entertainment
- Available in: French
- Founded: December 1, 2000; 25 years ago
- Headquarters: 11th arrondissement, Paris, France
- Founders: Kévin Kuipers; Clément Apap
- Key people: Alexandre Cortes (editor-in-chief)
- Industry: Video game journalism
- Parent: CNET Networks (2007–2014); CUP Interactive (2014–2015); TF1 Group (2015–2022); Reworld Media (2022–present)
- Website: www.gamekult.com
- Registration: Optional
- Current status: Active

Gamekult is a French video game journalism website founded in December 2000. Agence Française pour le Jeu Vidéo (AFJV) described it as an iconic brand and the second largest French language video game website in 2018.

== History ==
The website was launched by Kévin Kuipers and Clément Apap in December 2000 while French retailer LDLC acquired a 35% stake. It was acquired by CNET Networks in January 2007. Founders Apap and Kuipers stopped being involved with the website and later launched SensCritique. In January 2014, a management buyout was conducted by CNET France parent CBS Interactive France, creating new company CUP Interactive. CUP Interactive, later Neweb, was acquired by TF1 Group in October 2015. In January 2022, Les Numériques and Gamekult announced to increase their editorial collaboration. On June 29, 2022, TF1 announced it had signed an agreement with the Reworld Media group to sell its digital media division Unify (formerly Neweb), which includes Gamekult.
