= Disco Extravaganza =

Studio album by Army of Lovers
- Released: April 28, 1990; August 13, 1991
- Genre: Pop, dance
- Label: Ton Son Ton; Giant (1991)
- Producer: Alexander Bard, Anders Hansson, Anders Wollbeck, Ola Håkansson, Tim Norell, Emil Hellman, Magnus Frykberg

Army of Lovers chronology
Disco Extravaganza (1990)	Massive Luxury Overdose (1991)

Singles from Disco Extravaganza
- 1. "Love Me Like a Loaded Gun" Released: July 1988; 2. "Baby's Got a Neutron Bomb" Released: November 1989; 3. "Ride the Bullet" Released: January 1990; 4. "My Army of Lovers" Released: March 1990; 5. "Supernatural" Released: June 1990

Disco Extravaganza is the debut studio album by Swedish pop group Army of Lovers, released in 1990. In the US, the album was simply titled Army of Lovers and was released there the following year. A remastered version of the album was released in 2006.

== Overview ==
The track list is slightly different for the US version. "Supernatural" and "Ride the Bullet" were presented in re-recorded versions, which later appeared on the band's second album Massive Luxury Overdose. The song "My Army of Lovers" was also included on that album. The track "Viva La Vogue" was used in the soundtrack of the comedy film Don't Tell Mom the Babysitter's Dead. "Birds of Prey" is a faithful rendition of the first section of the original "Birds of Prey", the first track on the United Artists 1976 album release New Nation, by Roderick Falconer.

The album was first planned to be released only in Scandinavia, but in the winter of 1990/91 when the band performed on the Super Channel show, 40 million people in Japan watched them and the album was released there too. After four months, the album was still in the top 50 in Japan.

== Critical reception ==
Professional ratings
Review scores
Source	Rating
AllMusic	2.5/5 stars
The Encyclopedia of Popular Music	3/5 stars

AllMusic editor Ned Raggett wrote that the band's self-titled release "fuses Eurodisco's pulse and sheen (and at points the all-important string swirls, as "Ride the Bullet" merrily shows) with gay abandon in all senses of the word. The Army doesn't quite hit the heights that Deee-Lite served up with its own delicious debut World Clique, from the same year, but comes awfully close. Earlier hits "Supernatural" and "Love Me Like a Loaded Gun" appear with a slew of similarly minded songs (great titles abound—some standouts: "Mondo Trasho" and "I Am the Amazon"). [...] Quirky samples sneak in at points as well, from The Andy Griffith Show's whistled theme to the "ooga-chuckas" from "Hooked on a Feeling". Add to that such delectabilities as the French vocals on "Scorpio Rising" and random theremin noises, and the Army begins its mission in full effect."

Billboard wrote, "Charming Swedish trio comes on like a cross between Depeche Mode and Abba on this sparkling debut, which is chockfull of spine-stirring Euro-dance grooves and radio-ready hooks. Although "My Army of Lovers" is starting to make noise, stronger tunes wait in the wings. "Love Me Like a Loaded Gun" glides with a techno-hip house beat, while "Ride the Bullet" is a festive disco anthem."

== Track listing ==
Standard edition
No.	Title	Length
1.	"Birds of Prey"	1:10
2.	"Ride the Bullet"	4:20
3.	"Supernatural"	4:09
4.	"Viva la Vogue"	3:33
5.	"Shoot That Laserbeam (Re-Recorded Version)"	4:24
6.	"Love Me Like a Loaded Gun (1990 remix)"	4:57
7.	"Baby's Got a Neutron Bomb (1990 remix)"	3:23
8.	"Love Revolution"	4:02
9.	"Scorpio Rising"	4:32
10.	"Mondo Trasho"	4:23
11.	"Dog"	3:59
12.	"My Army of Lovers"	3:27

Alternative tracks on the Army of Lovers edition
No.	Title	Length
2.	"Ride the Bullet (1991 remix)"	3:42
3.	"Supernatural (1991 remix)"	3:54

Additional tracks on the CD editions of Disco Extravaganza and Army of Lovers
No.	Title	Length
13.	"Hey Mr. DJ"	3:47
14.	"I Am the Amazon"	4:12
15.	"Planet Coma 3AM"	3:51

== Credits ==
Design [Sleeve] – Marie Sundström-Wollbeck
Directed By [Video Clips] – Fredrik Boklund, Martin Persson
Executive-Producer – Ola Håkansson
Mixed By – Emil Hellman (tracks: 1 to 11, 13 to 15)
Other [Additional Stage Costumes] – Henric Stacy
Other [Hair And Make-Up] – Jean-Pierre Barda
Other [Promotional Supervisor] – Jonas Holst
Other [Stylist] – Camilla Thulin
Photography By – Kent Billeqvist
Programmed By – Magnus Frykberg (tracks: 1, 3 to 11, 13 to 15)
Vocals, Bass – La Camilla
Vocals, Computer – Alexander Bard
Vocals, Drums – Jean-Pierre Barda
