= My Army of Lovers =

Single by Army of Lovers

from the album Disco Extravaganza and Massive Luxury Overdose (1991)
- B-side: "Scorpio Rising"
- Released: May 1990 and July 1991
- Genre: Disco; Eurodance; hip-hop
- Length: 3:27
- Label: Ton Son Ton
- Songwriters: Alexander Bard; Jean-Pierre Barda; Tim Norell; Peo Tyrén
- Producers: Anders Hansson; Ola Håkansson; Tim Norell

Army of Lovers singles chronology
"Ride the Bullet" (1990)	"My Army of Lovers" (1990)	"Supernatural" (1990)

Music video
- "My Army of Lovers" on YouTube

"My Army of Lovers" is a song by Swedish dance music group Army of Lovers, released in March 1990, by Ton Son Ton, as the fourth single from their debut album, Disco Extravaganza (1990). The song was written by Tim Norell, Ola Håkansson, Alexander Bard, Anders Hansson and Peo Thyrén. It reuses the instrumental track of "Barbie Goes Around the World" released by the group when they were performing under the name Barbie. The accompanying music video won the Swedish 1991 Grammis award for best music video.

The song was sampled by Madonna on the track "My Sins Are My Savior" (featuring Stromae) on her 2026 album Confessions II.

== Critical reception ==
Swedish Aftonbladet described the song as "dreamy". Larry Flick from Billboard magazine wrote, "Pop-flavored dance nugget by Euro-trio has already scored with import-conscious folks. Shuffling hip-hop groove foundation offers sturdy support for mantra-like vocals and an infectious, radio-ready hook." Andy Kastanas from The Charlotte Observer viewed it as "a down tempo Eurobeat marvel that's somewhat reminiscent of the Imagination classic 'Just an Illusion' with steamy French female vocals that'll soften you up for the kill." A reviewer from Music & Media commented, "Army of Lovers combine some pretty heavy grooves with sultry vocals by singer La Camilla, along with Arabian chants. The record has that exotic something extra which makes a song worthwhile. Yet another strong, innovative track from Scandinavia."

== Single track listing ==
- 7" single (Sweden, 1990)
1. My Army of Lovers (Radio Edit) - 3:27
2. Scorpio Rising (Album Version) - 4:33
- 7" single (France, 1990)
1. My Army of Lovers (Radio Edit) - 3:27
2. Ride the Bullet (Album Version) - 4:20
- 12" maxi-single (Sweden, 1990)
1. My Army of Lovers (Tour Du Monde Club Mix) - 7:02
2. My Army of Lovers (Radio Edit) - 3:27
3. Scorpio Rising (Glasnostrology Mix) - 7:59
4. My Army of Lovers (Taj Mahal Dub) - 6:06
- 12" maxi-single (France, 1990)
1. My Army of Lovers (Tour Du Monde Club Mix) - 8:27
2. My Army of Lovers (Radio Edit) - 3:27
3. My Army of Lovers (The Pisces Remix) - 5:25
- 12" maxi-single (black sleeve) (UK, 1990)
1. My Army of Lovers (Concrete Ghetto Mix) - 8:27
2. My Army of Lovers (Tour Du Monde Club Mix) - 7:00
3. Scorpio Rising (Glasnostrology Mix) - 7:59
- 12" maxi-single (white sleeve) (UK, 1990)
1. My Army of Lovers (The Pisces Remix) - 5:25
2. My Army of Lovers (Tour Du Monde Club Mix) - 7:00
3. Scorpio Rising (Glasnostrology Mix) - 7:59
- CD single (France, 1990)
1. My Army of Lovers (Radio Edit) - 3:27
2. Birds of Prey - 1:10
3. Ride the Bullet (Album Version) - 4:20
4. Scorpio Rising (Glasnostrology Mix) - 7:59
- CD maxi (U.S, 1991)
1. My Army of Lovers (Concrete Ghetto Mix) - 8:46
2. My Army of Lovers (Pisces Atmosphere Mix) - 5:23
3. My Army of Lovers (Nuzak Remix Club Edit) - 6:26
4. My Army of Lovers (Pisces Stratosphere Mix) - 5:51
