= Tradedoubler =

Swedish digital marketing company

Tradedoubler AB (publ)
- Type: Public (Aktiebolag)
- Traded as: Nasdaq Stockholm: TRAD
- Founded: 1999
- Headquarters: Stockholm, Sweden
- Products: Affiliate network, ad network, Performance Marketing
- Parent: Reworld Media
- Website: http://www.tradedoubler.com/en/about/

Tradedoubler is a global affiliate marketing network and a provider of performance marketing and technology. The company was founded in Stockholm, Sweden, by Felix Hagnö and Martin Lorentzon in September 1999. Since 2014, Matthias Stadelmeyer is leading the company as president and CEO.

In addition to the Swedish headquarters, Tradedoubler has 15 offices in several countries and operates in over 80 countries worldwide. Since 2005 Tradedoubler AB has been listed on the Stockholm Stock Exchange.

== History ==
In 1999 the company was established in Sweden by Martin Lorentzon and Felix Hagnö.

Since 2005 Tradedoubler has been listed on NASDAQ Stockholm.

In 2016, the French media group Reworld Media became Tradedoubler's majority owner by acquiring a 19.1% stake in the company. In 2017, Reworld Media increased its shareholding in Tradedoubler to 40%. In 2023 their shareholding in Tradedoubler is at 51.8%.

== See also ==
- Affiliate marketing
- Affiliate network
