= Ride the Bullet =

- Standard artwork for the 1992 version

Single by Army of Lovers

from the album Disco Extravaganza and Massive Luxury Overdose
- B-side: "Mondo Trasho"; "Love Me Like a Loaded Gun"
- Released: January 1990 and 1992
- Genre: Dance-pop; disco; Eurodisco
- Length: 4:20 (1990 version); 3:42 (1991 remix); 3:27 (1992 version)
- Label: Ton Son Ton; Ultrapop
- Songwriters: Alexander Bard; Anders Wollbeck; Jean-Pierre Barda; Emil Hellman; Camilla Henemark
- Producers: Alexander Bard; Anders Wollbeck; Emil Hellman; Per Adebratt

Army of Lovers singles chronology
| "Baby's Got a Neutron Bomb" (1989) | "Ride the Bullet" (1990) | "My Army of Lovers" (1990) |
| "Candyman Messiah" (1991) | "Ride the Bullet" (1992) | "Judgment Day" (1992) |

Music video
- "Ride the Bullet" (1990) on YouTube

Music video
- "Ride the Bullet" (1992) on YouTube

"Ride the Bullet" is a song recorded by Swedish Eurodance group Army of Lovers. It is written by group members Alexander Bard, Jean-Pierre Barda and Camilla Henemark with Emil Hellman and Anders Wollbeck, and was originally released on their debut album, Disco Extravaganza (1990). In 1991, the song was remixed and included on the group's second album, Massive Luxury Overdose (1991), and the US release of Disco Extravaganza titled Army of Lovers. A single was released both times; in 1990 and 1992. And both years, a music video was produced, directed by Fredrik Boklund.

The 1990 release features vocals by La Camilla, but in the 1992 remix she was replaced by De La Cour after Camilla left the group in 1991. The 1992 remix of "Ride the Bullet" peaked at number one in Israel, number four in Austria and Finland, and number nine in Greece.

== Chart performance ==
"Ride the Bullet" was a major hit on the charts in Europe, entering the top 10 in Austria (4), Finland (4) and Greece (9). Additionally, the song was a top-20 hit in Belgium (12), while peaking within the top 30 in Germany (22). In the Netherlands (34), Switzerland (40) and Sweden (32), it reached the top 40, as well as on the Eurochart Hot 100, where it peaked at number 40 in May 1992. On the European Dance Radio Chart, it reached number 24. In the United Kingdom, "Ride the Bullet" was a top-70 hit, peaking at number 67 in its first week at the UK Singles Chart, on April 12, 1992. Outside Europe, the song was a number-one hit for one week in Israel in May 1992.

== Critical reception ==
AllMusic editor Ned Raggett noted that "Ride the Bullet" "fuses Eurodisco's pulse and sheen and the all-important string swirls, as [the track] merrily shows". Larry Flick from Billboard magazine named it a "festive disco anthem". Ken Capobianco from The Boston Globe called it "an "everything-but-the-kitchen sink mix and it develops an intoxicating groove". Bevan Hannah from The Canberra Times described it as "high energy" and "very catchy". Swedish Expressen complimented it as "great". A reviewer from Liverpool Echo wrote, "Not quite as camp as 'Crucified', this new single concentrates on an almost straightforward dance-pop style". Paul Lester from Melody Maker said, "This is far less hamstrung by ham and hamped by camp than Army of Lovers' last hit, sensibly placing the emphasis on the dazzling disco dynamism of the project".

Rick Harmon from Montgomery Advertiser felt it's "music that sounds not only as if it was played by machine, but created by it". British magazine Music Week stated that the 1992 version is "sounding fashionably retro". Johnny Dee from Smash Hits gave it a full score of five out of five, commenting, "A Technicolor disco wonderland of a record that'll make the charts a sunnier place if it's a hit. Above all, Sweden's most excellent pop tarts are totally top because they look like cartoon characters, realise pop music's a funny old thing and want the whole world to join their love train." Tom Maurstad from Spartanburg Herald-Journal said "there is a giddy extravangance to the way the group parades its sources and influences" and noted "the Donna Summer's-'Last Dance'-meets-the-O'Jays-'Love Train' pulsations".

== Music video ==
There were produced two different music videos for the song, one with La Camilla in 1990 and one with De La Cour in 1992. Both were directed by Swedish director Fredrik Boklund. He also directed the other videos for Army of Lovers. Version 1 and 2 were later published on YouTube in 2016, and by May 2023, they had generated more than 48,000 and 344,000 views.

== Track listing ==
7" single (1990)
| No. | Title | Length |
|---|---|---|
| 1. | "Ride the Bullet" (Album Version) | 4:20 |
| 2. | "Mondo Trasho" (Album Version) | 4:25 |

12" maxi (1990)
| No. | Title | Length |
|---|---|---|
| 1. | "Ride the Bullet" (Extended Vaganza Mix) | 9.45 |
| 2. | "Dub the Bullet" | 6:04 |
| 3. | "Love Me Like a Loaded Gun" (The 1990 Remix) | 4:57 |

CD maxi, France (1990)
| No. | Title | Length |
|---|---|---|
| 1. | "Ride the Bullet" (Album Version) | 4:20 |
| 2. | "Ride the Bullet" (Vaganza Mix) | 9:45 |
| 3. | "Ride the Bullet" (Swemix Hip House Remix) | 5:25 |

7" single (1992)
| No. | Title | Length |
|---|---|---|
| 1. | "Ride the Bullet" (Radio Edit) | 3:27 |
| 2. | "Love Me Like a Loaded Gun" (Radio Edit) | 3:24 |

12" maxi (1992)
| No. | Title | Length |
|---|---|---|
| 1. | "Ride the Bullet" (Radio Edit) | 3:27 |
| 2. | "Ride the Bullet" (Tren De Amor Mix) | 6:24 |
| 3. | "Ride the Bullet" (DNA Groove Approved) | 4:53 |
| 4. | "Ride the Bullet" (David Ford & The E.G. Orchestra Re-mix) | 5:25 |

CD maxi, Germany (1992)
| No. | Title | Length |
|---|---|---|
| 1. | "Ride the Bullet" (Radio Edit) | 3:27 |
| 2. | "Ride the Bullet" (Tren De Amor Mix) | 6:24 |
| 3. | "Ride the Bullet" (Molotov Cocktail Mix) | 4:57 |
| 4. | "Love Me Like a Loaded Gun" (Radio Edit) | 3:24 |
| 5. | "Love Me Like a Loaded Gun" (Atomic Macho Mix) | 5:51 |

CD maxi (Remixes), Germany (1992)
| No. | Title | Length |
|---|---|---|
| 1. | "Ride the Bullet" (The DNA Mix 7" Edit) | 3:15 |
| 2. | "Ride the Bullet" (Molotov Cocktail Mix) | 4:57 |
| 3. | "Ride the Bullet" (The DNA Mix) | 4:53 |
| 4. | "Ride the Bullet" (David Ford & The E.G. Orchestra Mix) | 5:18 |
| 5. | "Crucified" (The Mafia Mix) | 4:53 |

CD maxi, UK (1992)
| No. | Title | Length |
|---|---|---|
| 1. | "Ride the Bullet" (Radio Edit) | 3:27 |
| 2. | "Ride the Bullet" (Tren De Amor Mix) | 6:24 |
| 3. | "Ride the Bullet" (Molotov Cocktail Mix) | 4:57 |
| 4. | "Ride the Bullet" (DNA Groove Approved) | 4:53 |
| 5. | "Ride the Bullet" (David Ford & The E.G. Orchestra Re-mix) | 5:25 |

CD maxi, Australia (1992)
| No. | Title | Length |
|---|---|---|
| 1. | "Ride the Bullet" (The DNA Mix 7" Edit) | 3:15 |
| 2. | "Ride the Bullet" (Molotov Cocktail Mix) | 4:57 |
| 3. | "Ride the Bullet" (DNA 12" Mix) | 4:53 |
| 4. | "Ride the Bullet" (Dave Ford Remix) | 6:15 |
| 5. | "Crucified" (Crucifixion Hardcore '92 Mix) | 5:06 |

== Charts ==
| Chart (1992) | Peak position |
|---|---|
| Australia (ARIA) | 191 |
| Austria (Ö3 Austria Top 40) | 4 |
| Belgium (Ultratop 50 Flanders) | 12 |
| Europe (Eurochart Hot 100) | 40 |
| Europe (European Dance Radio) | 24 |
| Finland (IFPI) | 4 |
| Germany (GfK) | 22 |
| Greece (Virgin) | 9 |
| Israel (Israeli Singles Chart) | 1 |
| Netherlands (Dutch Top 40 Tipparade) | 2 |
| Netherlands (Single Top 100) | 34 |
| Sweden (Sverigetopplistan) | 32 |
| Switzerland (Schweizer Hitparade) | 40 |
| UK Singles (Official Charts) | 67 |
| UK Club Chart (Music Week) | 79 |
