= High Chaparral Theme Park =

Western theme park and museum in Sweden

High Chaparral
- High Chaparral logo

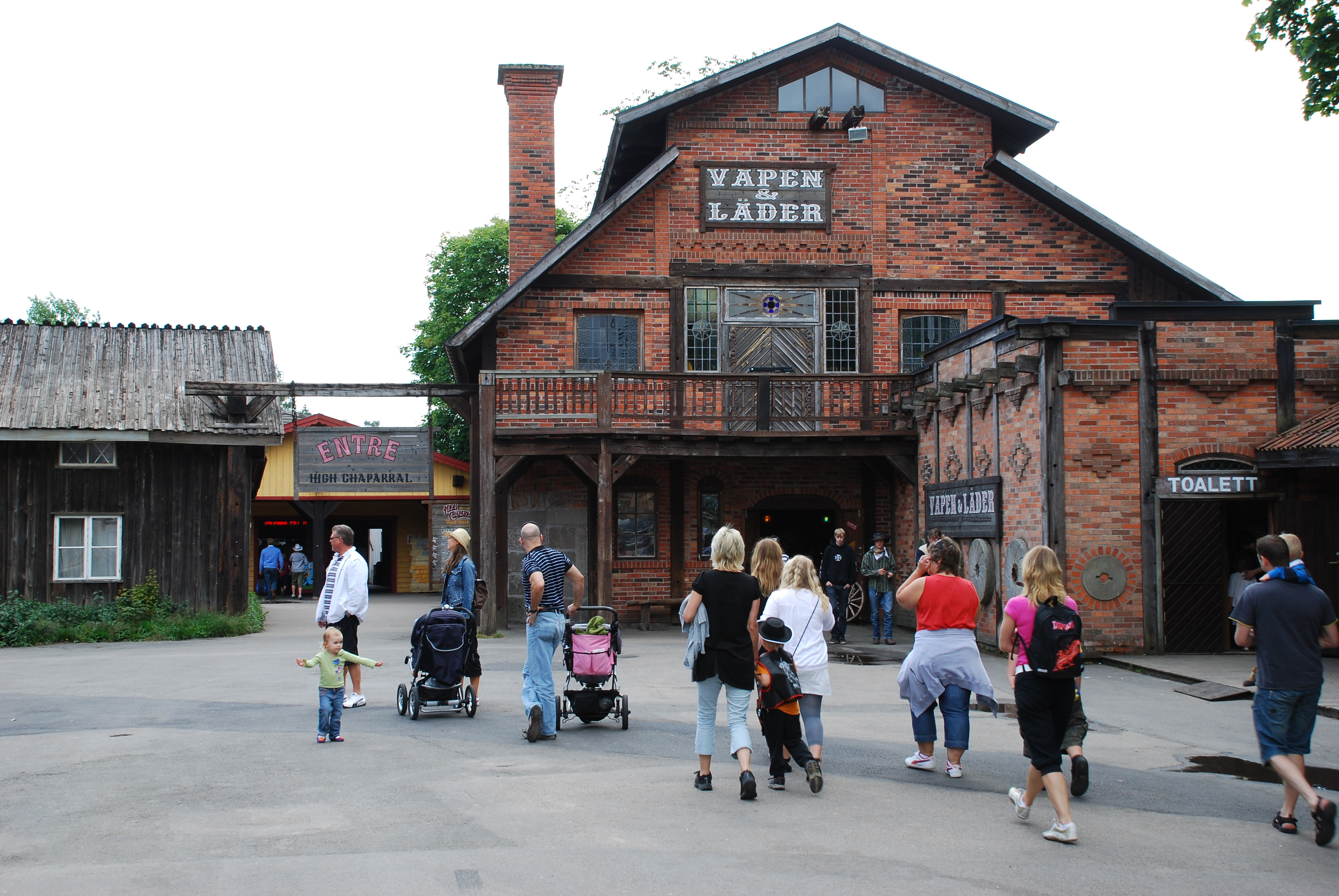
- Park entrance
- Interactive map of High Chaparral
- Location: Kulltorp, Sweden
- Coordinates: 57°15′48″N 13°49′38″E
- Opened: 1966
- Owner: Emil and Philip Erlandsson
- General manager: Emil Erlandsson
- Theme: Wild West
- Slogan: Bli en del av äventyret! ("Become part of the adventure!")
- Operating season: May-August
- Attendance: ca 250,000
- Area: 14 hectares (35 acres)
- Website: www.highchaparral.se

High Chaparral is a Wild West theme park and post-industrial museum of cultural artifacts and collectibles, located close to Värnamo, Sweden. It opened in 1966 and was founded by Bengt Erlandsson, more commonly known as "Big Bengt".

The park is located near Hillerstorp in Gnosjö Municipality and on the border with Värnamo Municipality, and the national park Store Mosse. It is close to the E4 motorway and Swedish national road 27.

== History ==
Bengt Erlandsson was born in 1922 in Brännehylte, Småland, Sweden. His parents owned a forest farm and a saw mill. His interest in the American frontier and Wild West was born from coming from a countryside where many had emigrated to America and from the stories they told. Erlandsson went to the United States himself in 1956 at age 34 and in four months touring covered 4,000 kilometres (2,500 mi). He came back to Sweden with a lot of impressions. When the Swedish national phone company had to get rid of 200,000 telephone poles, Erlandsson took the opportunity and constructed a western American style frontier fort and town with log cabins as it might have been used by the old United States Cavalry in the Indian Wars on the western frontier in North America during the 19th century. When many people started to get curious about the place, he realized its commercial/tourist and historical purposes and possibilities. Similar to Walt Disney's construction of various Disneylands and Disney Worlds with "Frontierlands" portions built into the entertainment parks in several foreign countries decades later.

In the 1990s Bengt was convicted of tax evasion.

For many years, the park offered free entrance to residents in neighbouring municipalities.

The park is currently managed by Bengt's grandsons, Emil and Philip Erlandsson, which have focused on attracting families.

Bengt Erlandsson died in March 2016 at the age of 93. In September 2016 Emil Erlansson, stepped down as the CEO and announced that he would build a similar but bigger park in the USA. The project was discontinued in 2019 for undisclosed reasons.

In 2018, two years after the death of Bengt, Emil and Philip created a large museum inside the park with their grandfather's collection of 1,200 items of, among others, toys, signs, paintings, cars, motorcycles and a steam train. The museum was however not a success and at the end of the season it was decided that the collection would be put on auction.

Following floods in January 2023, major parts of the park ended up underwater.

== Attractions ==
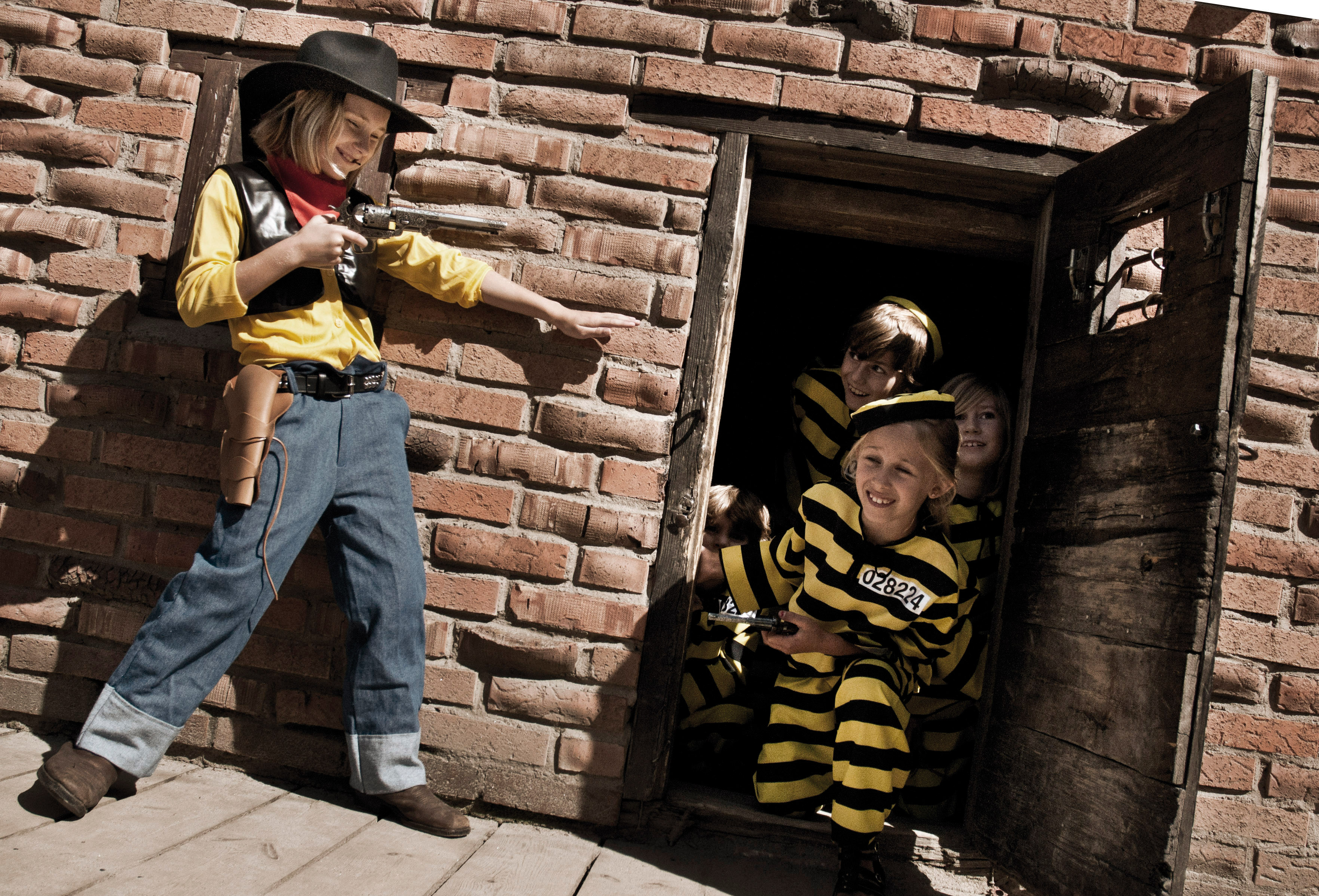
Children playing in the miniature city.

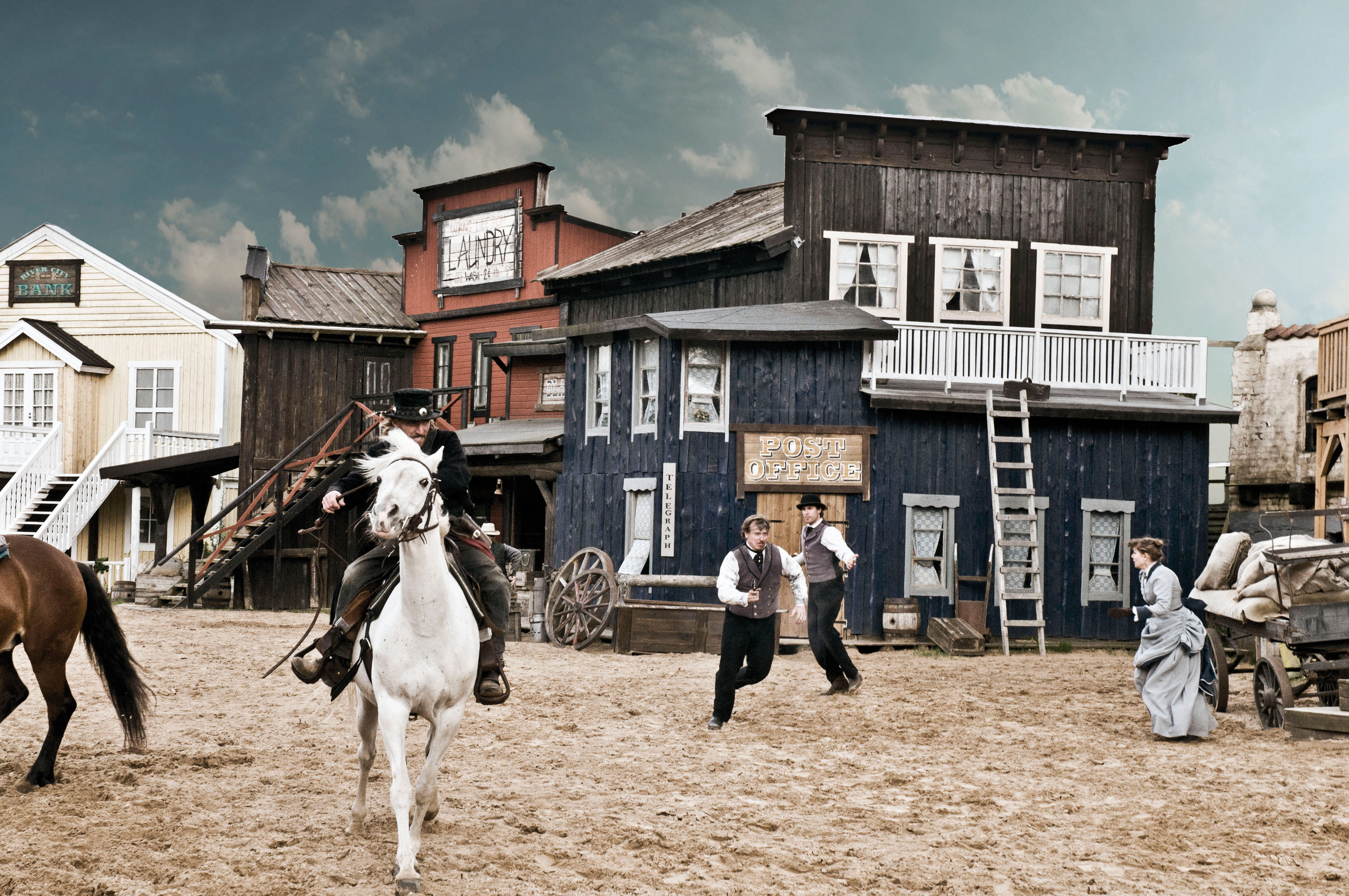
The Wild West Stunt Show

Apart from the Wild West theme there are Native American and Mexican themed areas. There are also a steam train and paddle steamer that run through the park and a pasture with buffalo.

The park stages several stunt shows a day and shows featuring Lucky Luke and the Daltons zorro and the wildwest stuntshow. There are many activities for kids including gold panning and a miniature city. There are stores with gear such as hats, vests, holsters and revolver and rifle replicas.

There is also a museum overflowing with cultural artifacts, old cars, machinery, and various Cold War oddities such as the bronze monster-size statue of Lenin expelled from Nowa Huta.

== Accommodation ==
Next to the park, there is a campground with cabins and trailers and a lake for swimming.

== See also ==
- Ponderosa Ranch
