= Törestorp =

- Location within Jönköping Location within Sweden
- Coordinates: 57°18′N 13°51′E
- Country: Sweden
- Province: Småland
- County: Jönköping County
- Municipality: Gnosjö Municipality

Area
  - Total: 0.58 km^{2} (0.22 sq mi)

Population (31 December 2010)
  - Total: 203
  - Density: 348/km^{2} (900/sq mi)
- Time zone: UTC+1 (CET)
  - Summer (DST): UTC+2 (CEST)
- Climate: Cfb

Törestorp is a locality situated in Gnosjö Municipality, Jönköping County, Sweden with 203 inhabitants in 2010.
