= Bicycle carrier =

Device attached to an automobile or bus for transporting bicycles

A bicycle carrier, also commonly called a bicycle rack, is a device attached to a vehicle to transport bicycles.

== Automotive ==
Automobile-mounted bike carriers can be attached to the roof, rear trunk, or rear tow hitch, depending on the vehicle. Carriers have been developed especially for the rear of pickup trucks that attach either to the bed or its sides.

Manufacturers offer bicycle carriers for use on motorcycles.

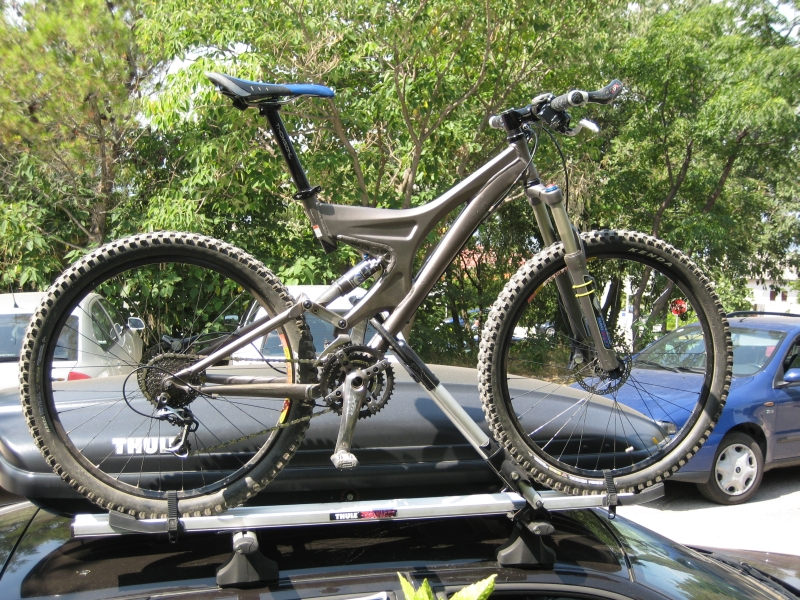
Roof-mounted bicycle rack

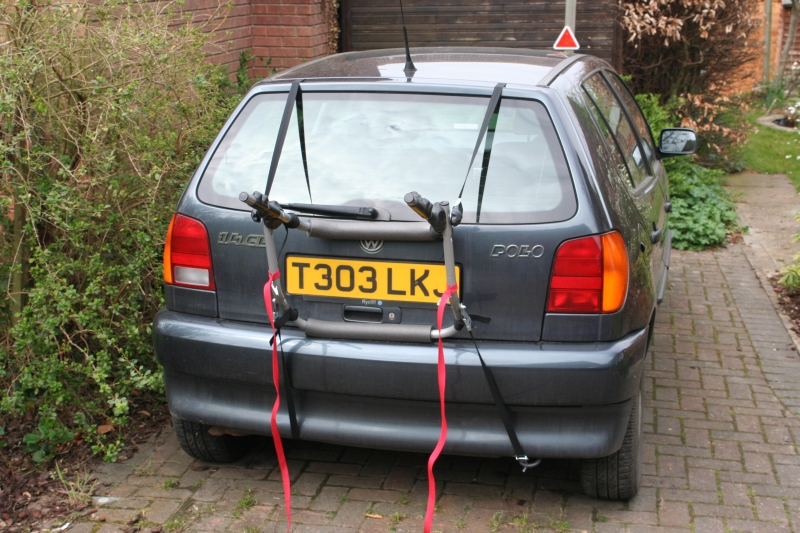
Trunk-mounted rack

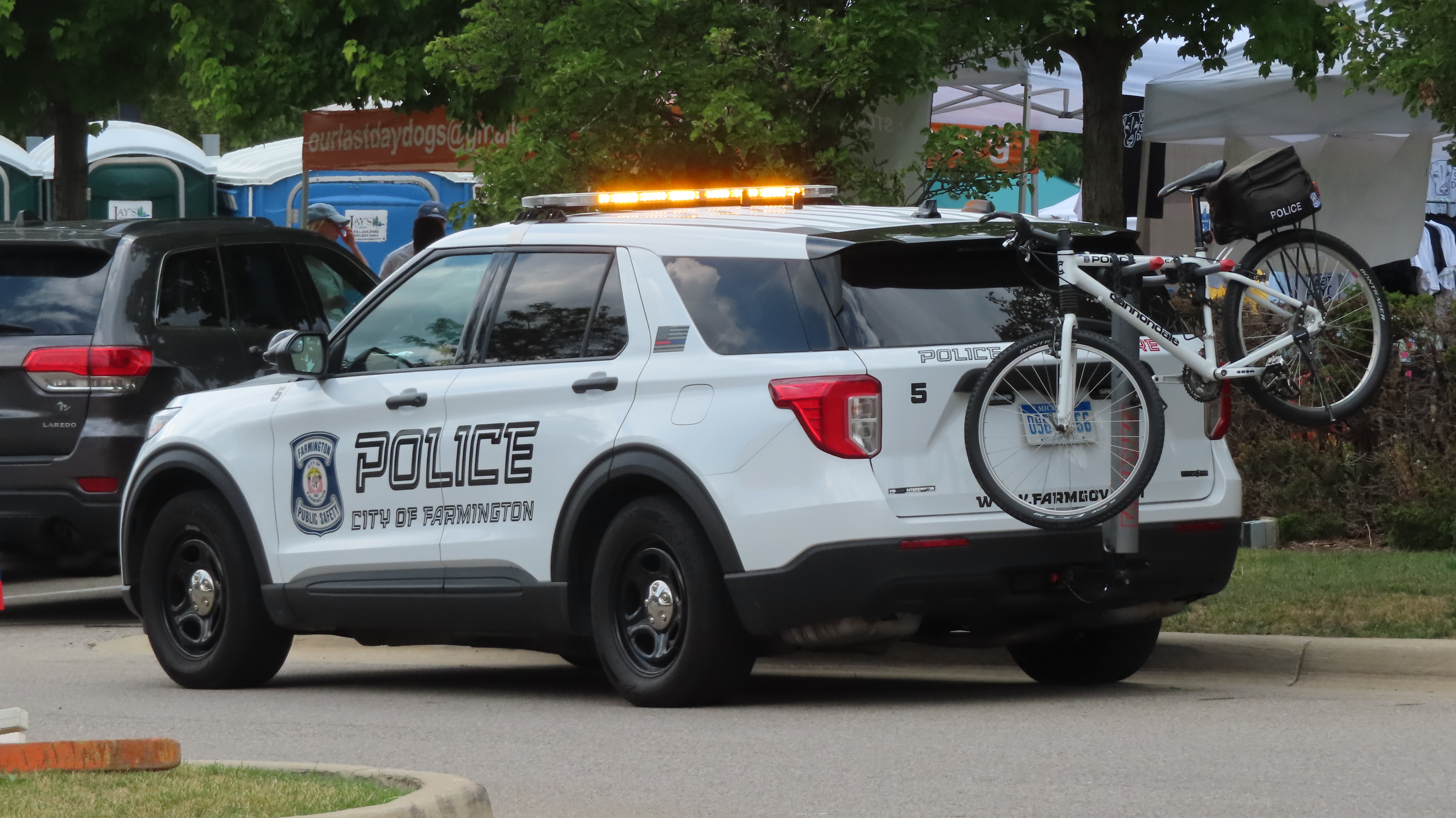
Trailer hitch-mounted rack on a police cruiser

== History ==
The first widely adopted strap-mounted carrier was invented in 1967 by American physicist Richard Aubrey Allen, who founded Allen Sports to manufacture and sell the racks.

== Public transport ==
=== Buses ===
Most public transit buses in the United States and Canada are equipped with bicycle racks, though they are far less common on transit systems outside North America. Bus-mounted bike carriers are usually attached to the front of the bus, and most are capable of collapsing when not in use. Some buses have rear-mounted racks. Others, particularly on bus rapid transit systems, are equipped with interior bicycle racks to decrease dwell time.

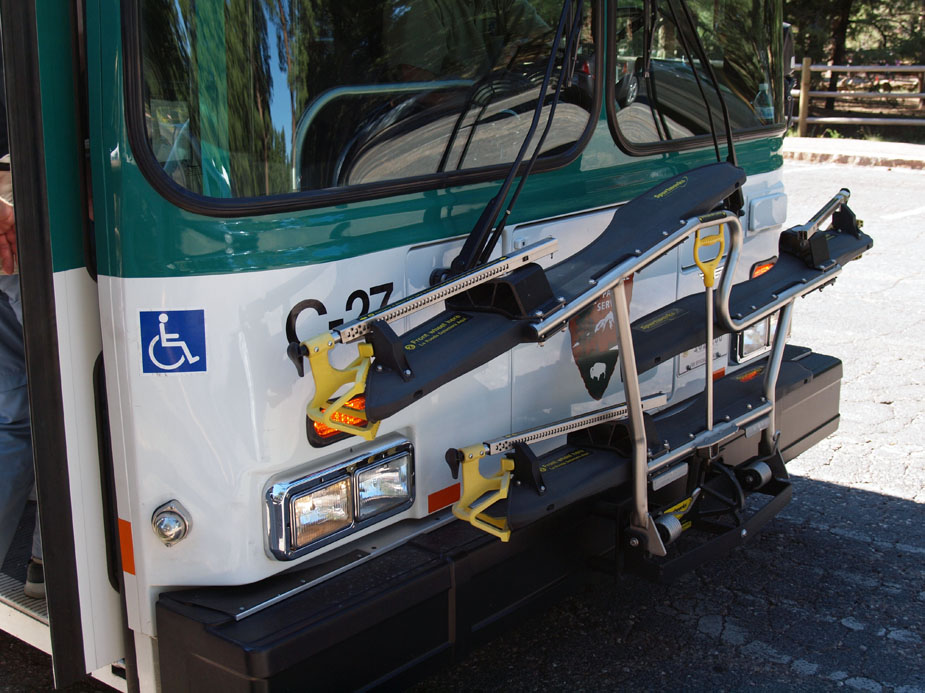
Front-mounted bicycle rack on American transit bus

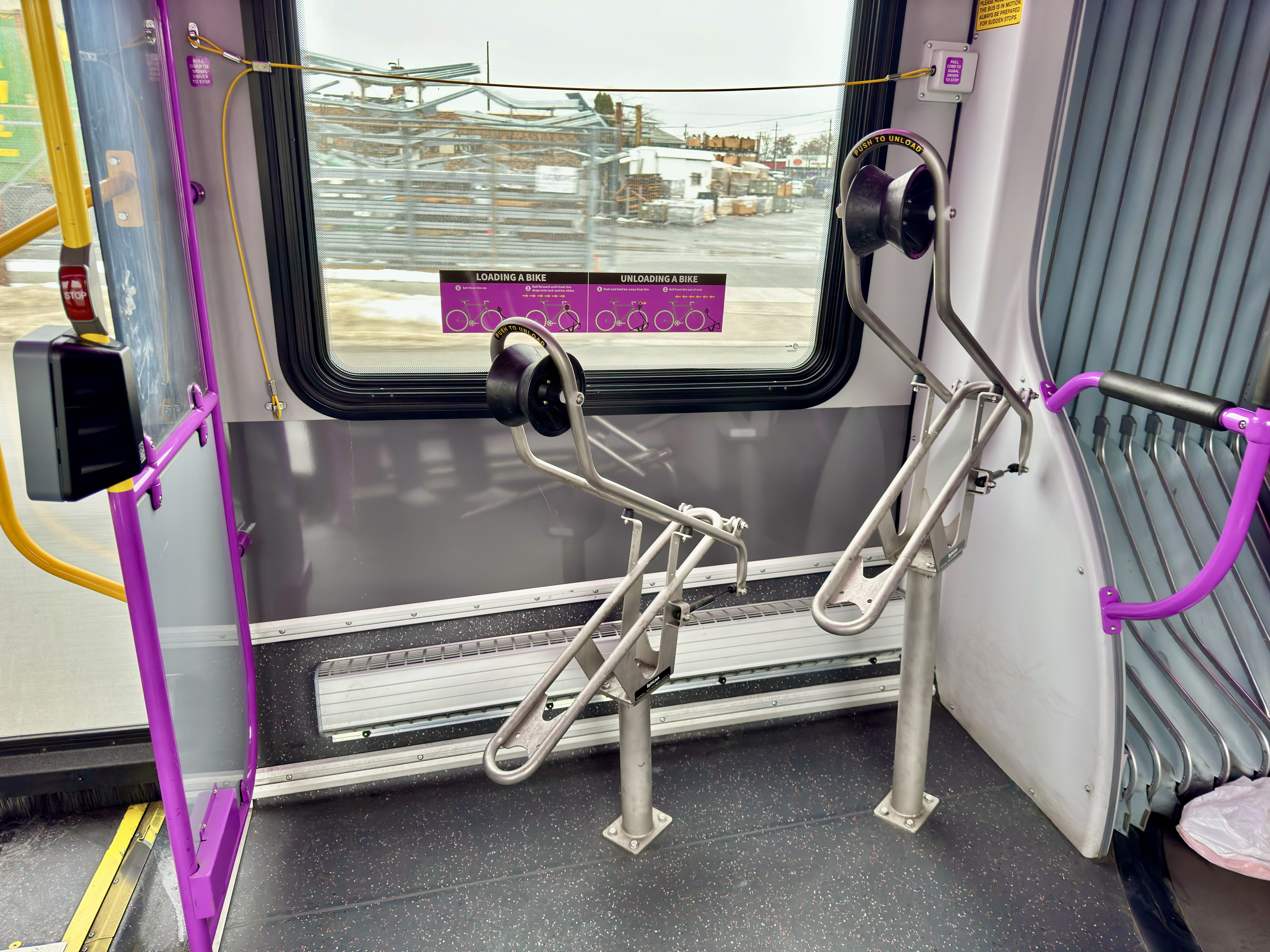
Interior bicycle rack on a bus

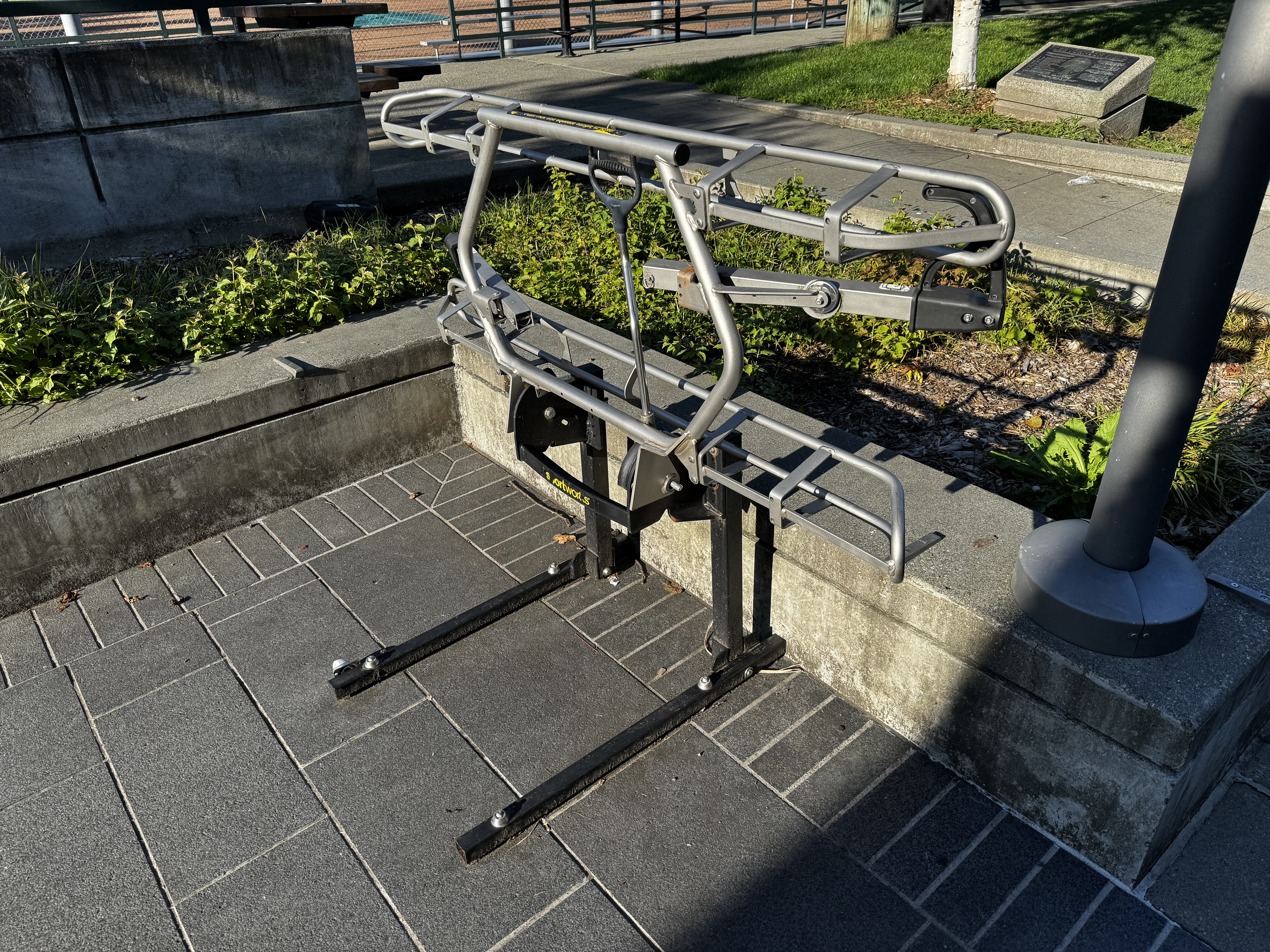
Standalone bicycle rack for practice usage

=== Trains ===
Many trains have interior bicycle racks. Some are horizontal, holding cycles in place on the floor, while others hold them vertically. Some trains have dedicated cars to hold bicycles in large volumes; in some cases, external flatcars.

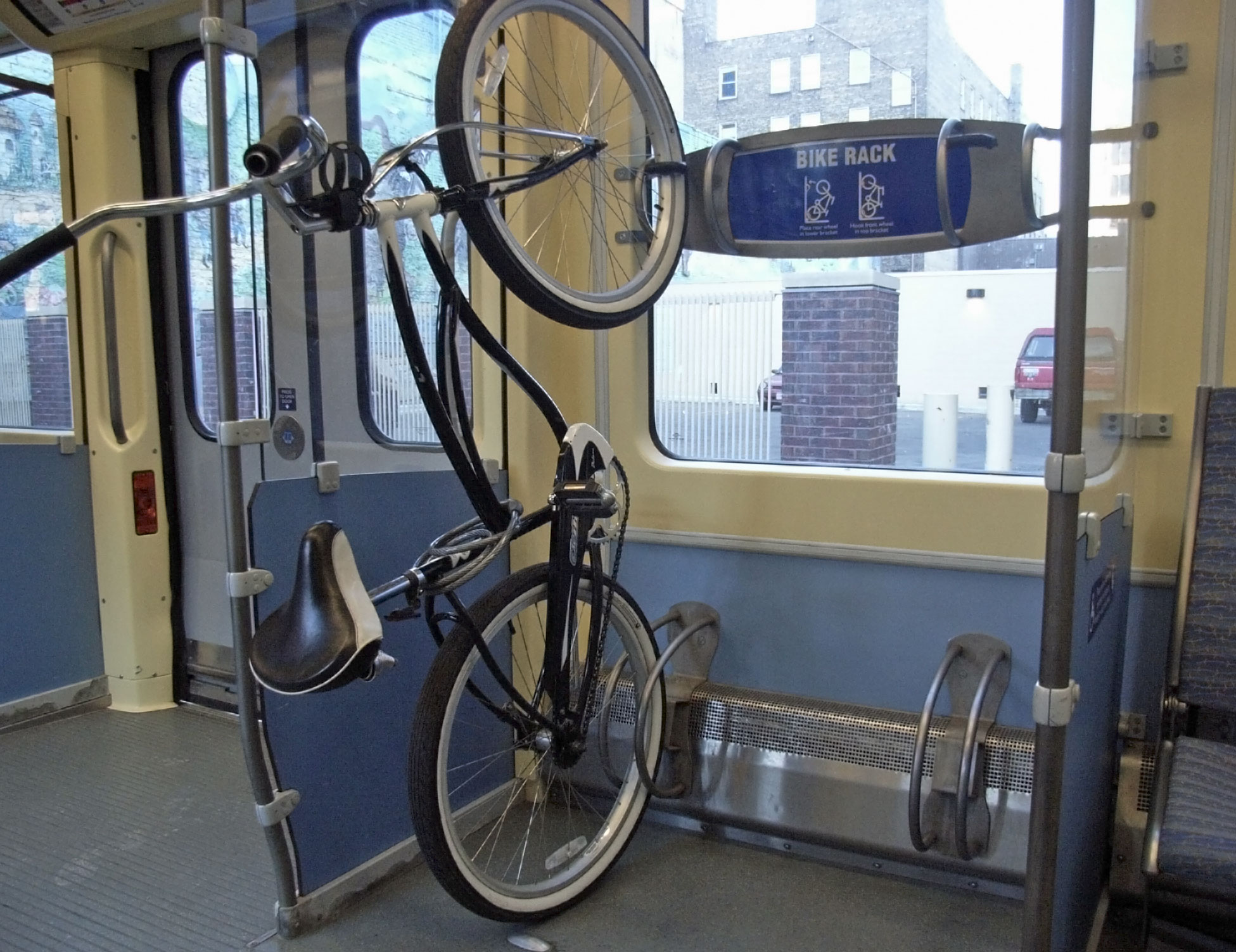
Vertical bike rack on an American light rail train

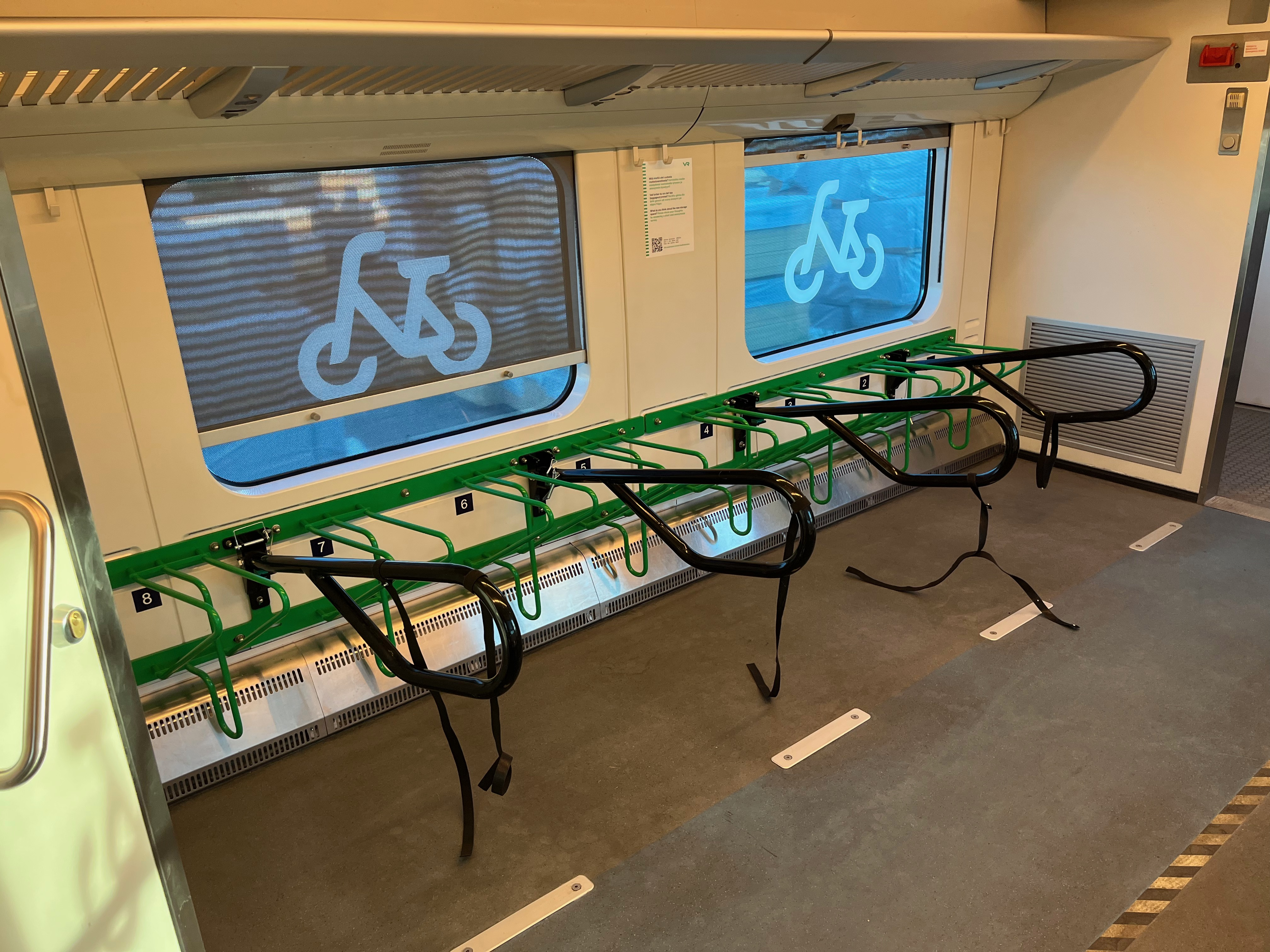
Floor bike rack on a train in Finland

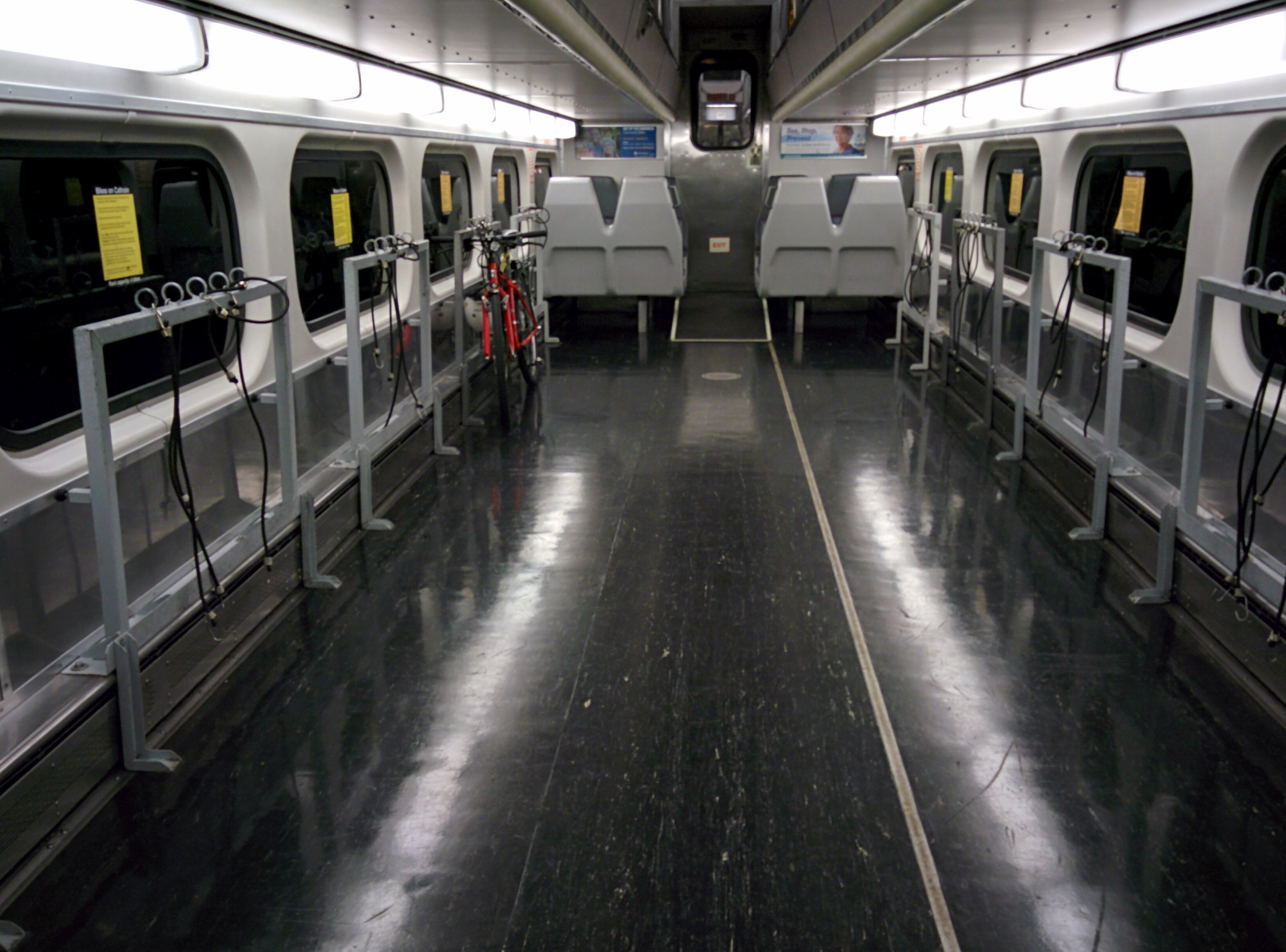
Dedicated car for bicycles on an American commuter train

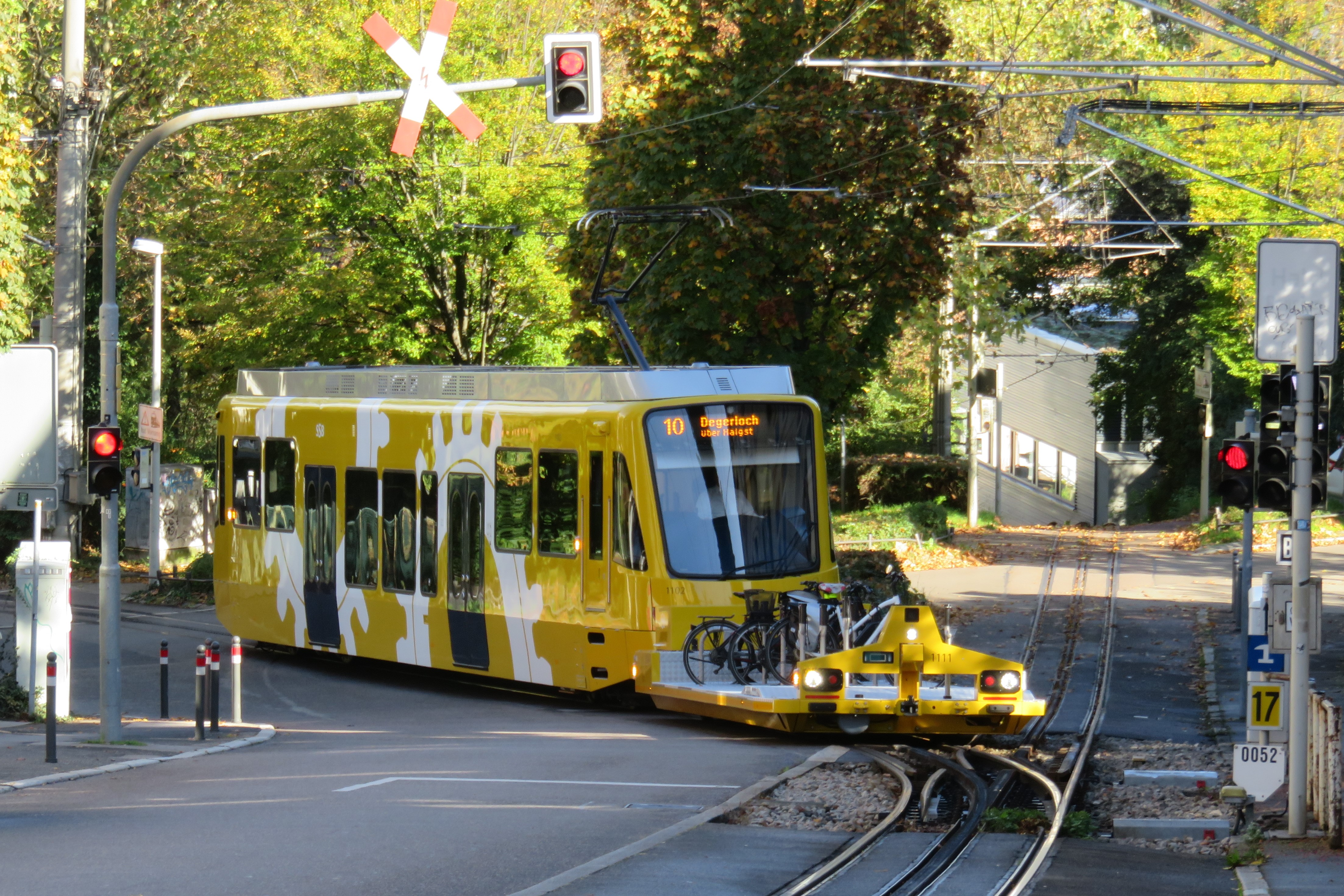
Bicycle flatcar on the Stuttgart Rack Railway

Sign used on Caltrain to indicate a train wagon intended for carrying bicycles

== Mounting ==
Bikes may be mounted in the carriers by clamping both wheels and providing some additional vertical support, by clamping the rear wheel and the front dropouts (necessitating the removal of the front wheel, which may be mounted separately on blades), or by clamping the top tube (usually in the case of rear hitch mounted carriers). There is a device available that connects from the stem to the seat post, to provide a top tube equivalent suitable for mounting in these carriers for step-through frame bicycles that do not have a top tube. Carriers that clamp on the front dropouts may also provide a built-in locking mechanism.

Special long carriers have been developed to support long-wheelbase recumbents and tandems.

== Transit authorities and makers ==
=== Oceania ===
==== Australia ====
- ACTION in Canberra

==== New Zealand ====
In November 2024 a government ruling stopped use of bike racks on buses until checks had been made that they didn't obscure headlights. Use was restored in stages from February 2025. From July 2025 15 Auckland buses are carrying bikes on internal racks.

- Metro in Christchurch, New Zealand (all routes)
- Dunedin
- Feilding
- Gisborne
- Hamilton (5 services to other towns)
- Hawkes Bay
- Invercargill
- Invercargill-Te Anau-Queenstown
- New Plymouth
- Nelson
- Palmerston North
- Rotorua
- Taupo
- Tauranga
- Timaru
- Waiheke Island
- Wellington
- Whangarei

=== Notable manufacturers for public transit ===
- Sportworks

== See also ==
- Bicycles and public transport
- Flexfix (a bike carrier integrated into the car's design)
- Homologation
- Intermodal passenger transport
- Roof rack
- Railroad wagon
