= Hillerstorp =

- Location within Jönköping Location within Sweden
- Coordinates: 57°19′N 13°52′E
- Country: Sweden
- Province: Småland
- County: Jönköping County
- Municipality: Gnosjö Municipality

Area
  - Total: 1.98 km^{2} (0.76 sq mi)

Population (31 December 2010)
  - Total: 1,766
  - Density: 893/km^{2} (2,310/sq mi)
- Time zone: UTC+1 (CET)
  - Summer (DST): UTC+2 (CEST)
- Climate: Cfb

Hillerstorp is a locality (tätort) situated in Gnosjö Municipality, Jönköping County, Sweden with 1,766 inhabitants in 2010. About 40% of the companies in Gnosjö municipality are located in Hillerstorp.

There are various small industries in the town. About 9 km south of Hillerstorp, there is a small but nationally renowned amusement park called High Chaparral Theme Park (named after the American Western-themed TV series aired on NBC) offering, among others, the steam train rides and the American Old West experiences.

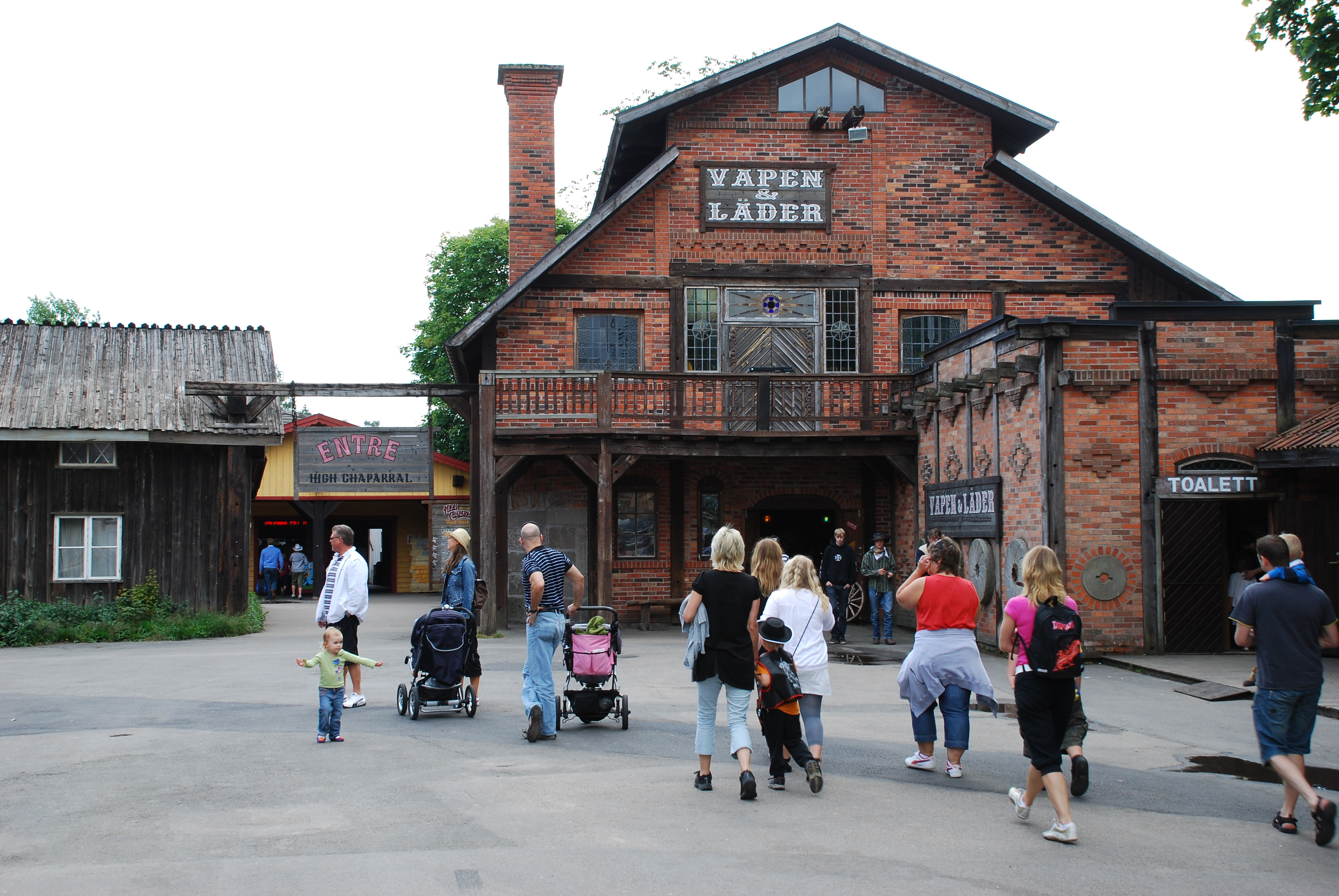
Entrance of the High Chaparral Theme Park and museum of the industrial history, Hillerstorp

== See also ==
- The High Chaparral, American Western broadcast on NBC
