= Åsenhöga =

- Location within Jönköping Location within Sweden
- Coordinates: 57°24′N 13°48′E
- Country: Sweden
- Province: Småland
- County: Jönköping County
- Municipality: Gnosjö Municipality

Area
  - Total: 0.37 km^{2} (0.14 sq mi)

Population (31 December 2010)
  - Total: 210
  - Density: 564/km^{2} (1,460/sq mi)
- Time zone: UTC+1 (CET)
  - Summer (DST): UTC+2 (CEST)
- Climate: Dfb

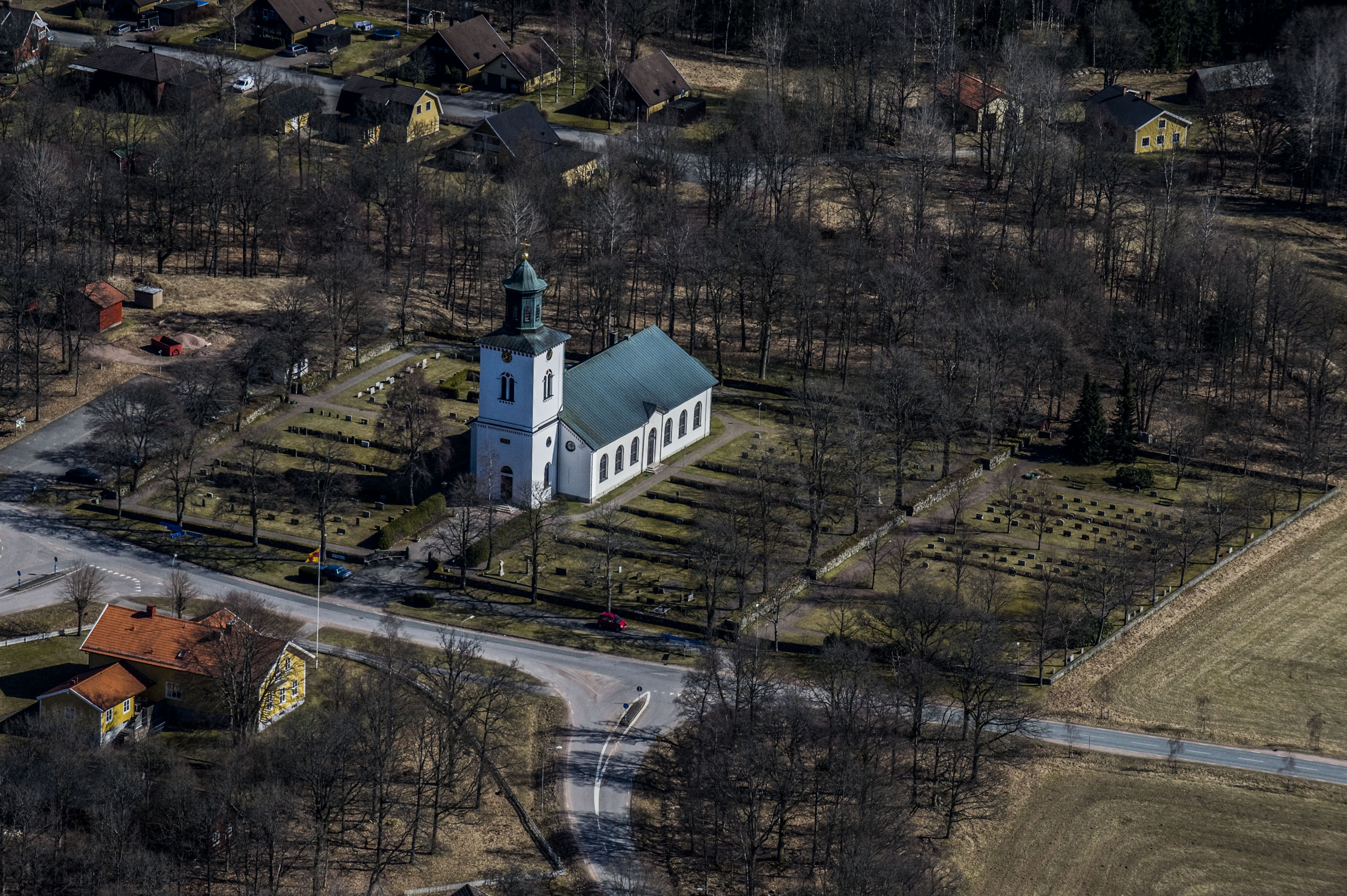

Åsenhöga is a locality situated in Gnosjö Municipality, Jönköping County, Sweden with 210 inhabitants in 2010.
