= Store Mosse National Park =

National park in Sweden

- Store Mosse nationalpark
- IUCN category II (national park)
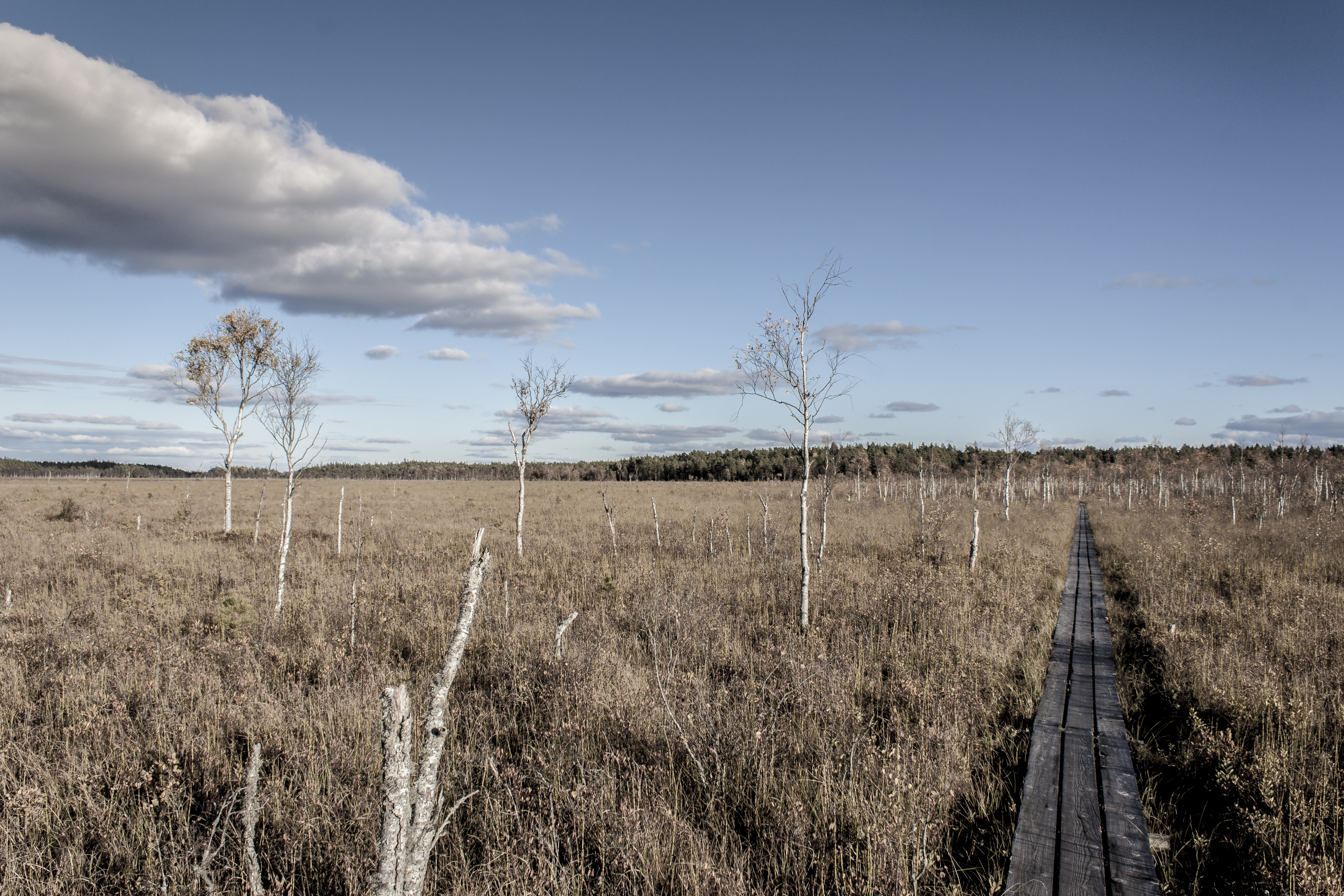
- Interactive map of Store Mosse National Park
- Location: Jönköping County, Sweden
- Coordinates: 57°16′N 13°55′E
- Area: 78.5 km^{2} (30.3 sq mi)
- Established: 1982
- Governing body: Naturvårdsverket

Ramsar Wetland
- Official name: Store Mosse
- Designated: 5 December 1974
- Reference no.: 20

National parks of Sweden (clickable map)

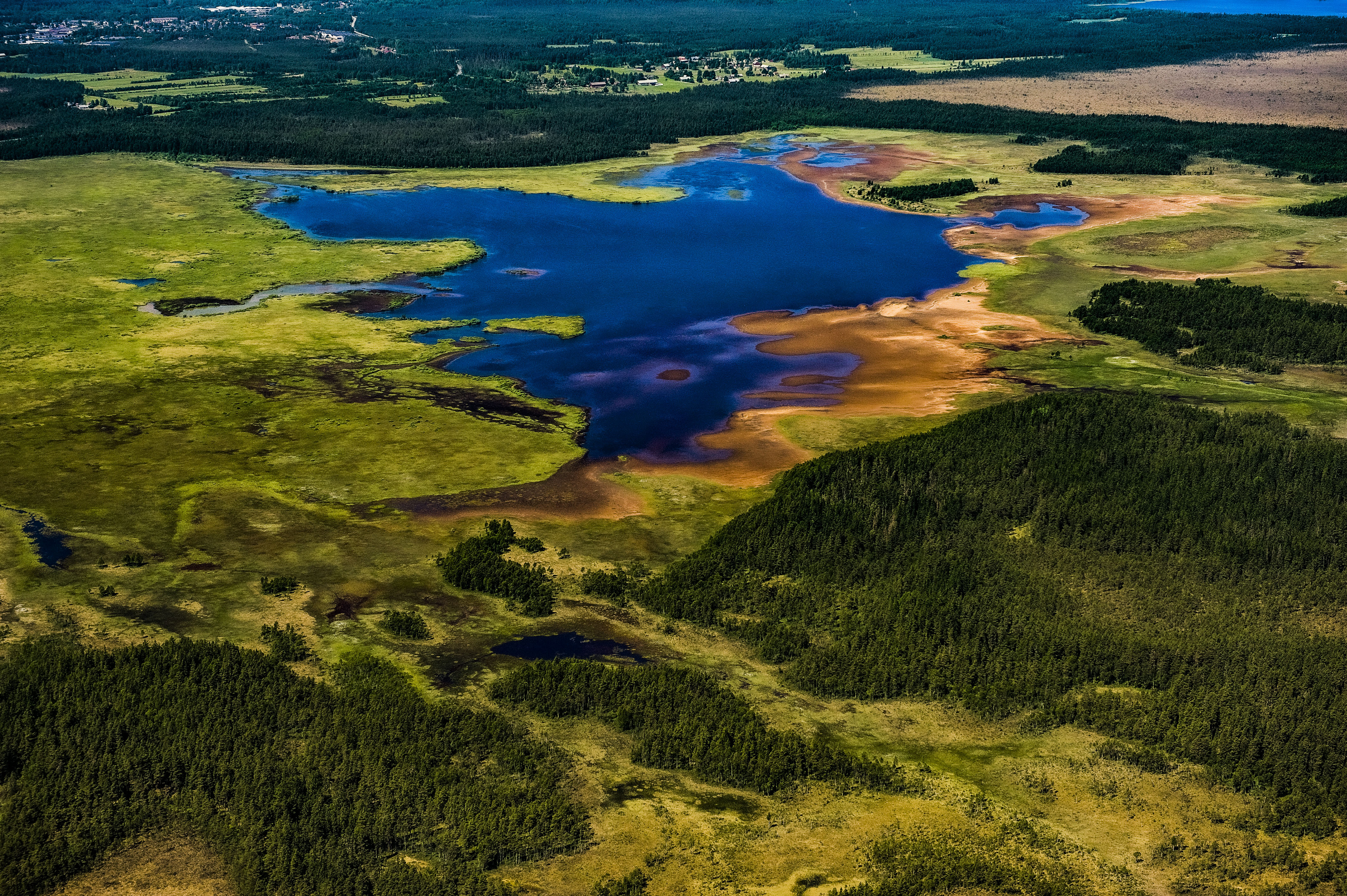
Store mosse National Park from above.

Store Mosse ("Big Marsh") is a national park in Småland in southern Sweden, located in the municipalities of Vaggeryd, Gnosjö and Värnamo. In total Store Mosse covers some 100 km^{2} (39 mi^{2}); of these, some 77 km^{2} (30 mi^{2}) were designated national park in 1983.

It has the largest boggy grounds south of Lapland and is an important area for birds and provides unique habitats for other animals and plants. The park has over 40 km (25 mi) of walking trails, three cabins available for overnight stay and a large bird watching tower.

Access to the park is free; guided tours are available all summer. There are also guided snowshoe tours on the bog in the summer.

Store Mosse National Park lies in the South Swedish highlands and the South Småland peneplain.

The area is not to be confused with Store Mosse nature reserve, an area in Blekinge of the same name. The name is shared by another nature reserve in Uddevalla.

== Accessing the park ==
Store Mosse national park is located along national road 151, between Värnamo and Gnosjö in southern Sweden. It is accessible by car or bus. Two of the trails are suited for persons in wheelchairs; one trail is also adapted for blind visitors.

== Naturum ==
At the Store Mosse national park there is a visitors' center called Naturum, where information about the history of the national park and its landscape, plants and animals is available. The center also has a bookshop and exhibitions about the park.

== See also ==
- List of national parks of Sweden
