= Reworld Media =

French media conglomerate

Reworld Media SA
- Type: Public (Société anonyme)
- Traded as: Euronext Paris: ALREW; Euronext Growth
- ISIN: FR0010820274
- Industry: Media
- Founded: 2012
- Headquarters: Boulogne-Billancourt, France, France
- Key people: Pascal Chevalier (President); Gautier Normand (vice president)
- Products: Medias, Press
- Revenue: 469,8 millions € (2021)
- Total equity: €
- Number of employees: 970 (2020)
- Subsidiaries: Mondadori France; Sporever Group
- Website: www.reworldmedia.com

Reworld Media is a French media conglomerate created in 2012 by Pascal Chevalier. The group became the leading group in terms of titles in France.

== Criticism ==
The way the group operates is criticized by many journalists, who consider that the activity of the group is more akin to advertisement to journalism. In many cases after the acquisitions, many of the journalists in the acquired titles have resigned en-masse because of this behavior shortly after the acquisition, and they get replaced by freelancers, an outsourcing policy described by its critics as the ‘uberisation’ of journalism.

== Affiliates ==
- Auto Plus
- Be Magazine
- Biba (magazine)
- Campagne Décoration
- Closer
- Diapason
- Eclypsia
- Envols
- Football365.fr
- Gourmand
- F1i
- Grazia
- Guerres et Histoire
- Icon
- L'Auto-Journal
- L'Ami des jardins et de la maison
- Le Chasseur français
- Le Journal de la maison
- Maison et Travaux
- Marie France
- Modes & Travaux
- Mon jardin et ma maison
- Nous deux
- Pleine Vie
- Psychologies
- Rugby365
- Science et Vie
- Sport365.fr
- Sport Auto
- Télé Magazine
- Télé Poche
- Télé Star
- Top santé
- Tradedoubler
