= Psychologies =

Women's magazine

- Cover of the December 2024 issue (UK)
- Founder: Jacques Mousseau
- Founded: 1970
- Company: Reworld Media (France); Kelsey Media (UK)
- ISSN: 1746-7349
- OCLC: 225962166

Psychologies is a monthly women's magazine dedicated to personal development and well-being, published by Reworld Media in France and Kelsey Media in the United Kingdom.

== History ==
Psychologies was founded in 1970 by Jacques Mousseau. Sales rose to 70,000 copies.

In 1997, the magazine was bought by Jean-Louis Servan-Schreiber and his wife Perla Finev, who, taking inspiration from the American Psychology Today magazine, renamed and relaunched the Psychologies magazine. After only a few years of publication the magazine found success, and reached 320,000 copies in 2005.

In 2004 Hachette Filipacchi Médias purchased 49% of Finev's capital.

The following year saw the creation of five international editions of the Psychologies magazine in Italy, Spain, Belgium, the United Kingdom and Russia. In 2006 and 2007 Chinese and Romanian editions were created. In 2008 Lagardère Active bought out of the remaining 51% of Finev capital and a Mexican edition was created.

Its German version was launched by Madame Verlag in November 2013.

In 2014, Hachette sold Psychologies and Premiere to a consortium led by Rossel called 4B Media.

In 2022, Reworld Media acquired the full ownership of the title.
