= Gnosjö region =

Region of southern Sweden

The Gnosjö region (Swedish: Gnosjöregionen) consists of the four municipalities of Sweden Gislaved, Gnosjö, Vaggeryd and Värnamo in Jönköping County in southern Sweden. It is named after Gnosjö, but is more properly abbreviated as the GGVV-region.

The area is nationally renowned by a high number of small industries, enterprises and a high employment rate. Many industries are based in the region, giving rise to the concept of a Gnosjö Spirit (Swedish: Gnosjöanda) that prevails in the area.

== Published material ==
In English:

- The Spirit of Gnosjö - The Grand Narrative and Beyond, Caroline Wigren

In Swedish:

- Därför lyckas Gnosjö - Bygden som blivit ett begrepp, Ola Gummesson
- Gnosjöandan - myt eller verklighet, Birgitta Wendeberg
- I skuggan av Gnosjöandan, Eva Londos
