= Kulltorp =

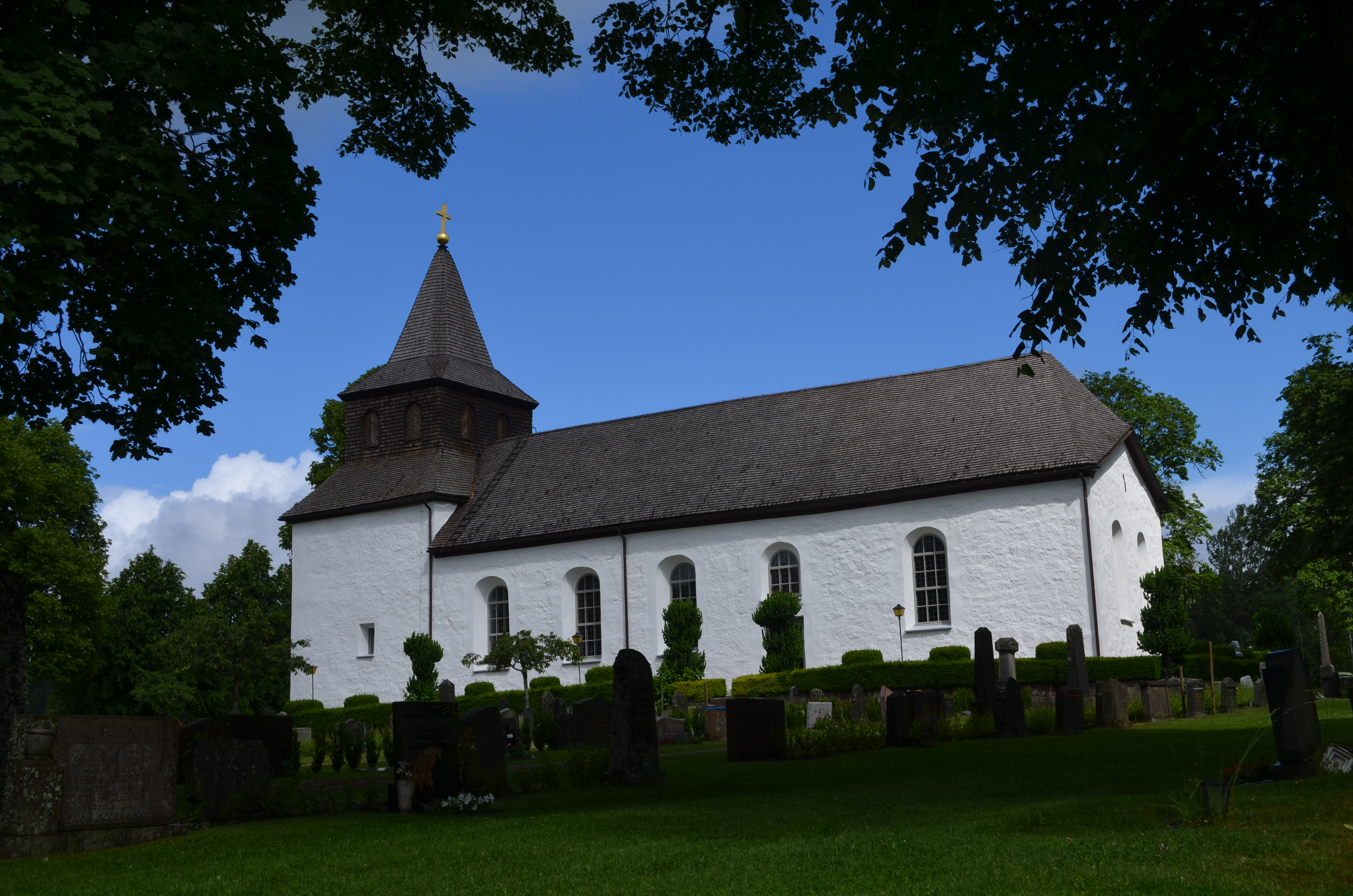
- Kulltorps kyrka

- Location within Jönköping Location within Sweden
- Coordinates: 57°16′N 13°47′E
- Country: Sweden
- Province: Småland
- County: Jönköping County
- Municipality: Gnosjö Municipality

Area
  - Total: 0.75 km^{2} (0.29 sq mi)

Population (31 December 2010)
  - Total: 334
  - Density: 447/km^{2} (1,160/sq mi)
- Time zone: UTC+1 (CET)
  - Summer (DST): UTC+2 (CEST)

Kulltorp is a locality situated in Gnosjö Municipality, Jönköping County, Sweden with 334 inhabitants in 2010.
