= Gnosjö =

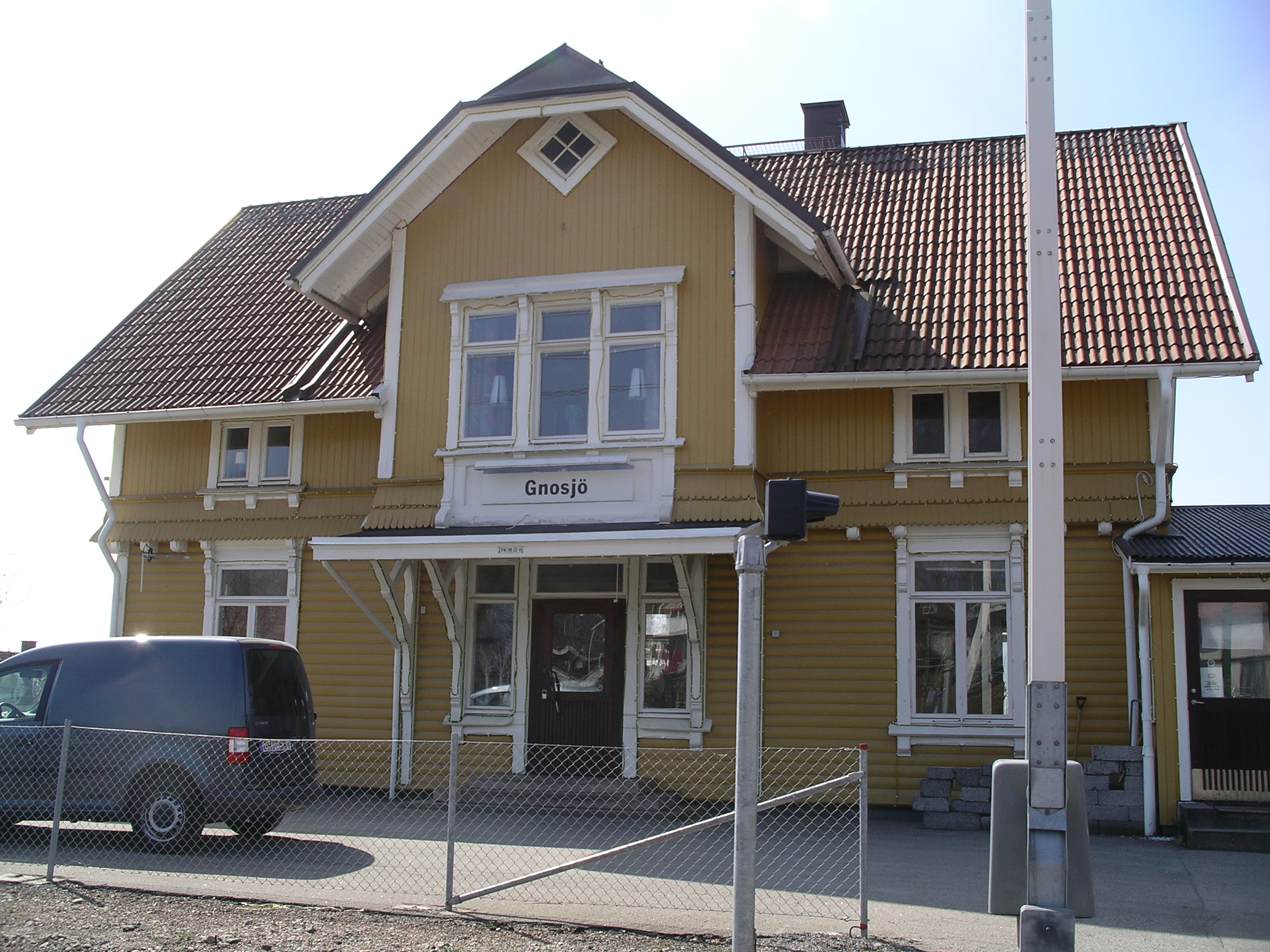
- Gnosjö Train Station

- Location within Jönköping Location within Sweden
- Coordinates: 57°22′N 13°44′E
- Country: Sweden
- Province: Småland
- County: Jönköping County
- Municipality: Gnosjö Municipality

Area
  - Total: 4.89 km^{2} (1.89 sq mi)

Population (31 December 2010)
  - Total: 4,326
  - Density: 885/km^{2} (2,290/sq mi)
- Time zone: UTC+1 (CET)
  - Summer (DST): UTC+2 (CEST)
- Climate: Cfb

Gnosjö is a locality and the seat of Gnosjö Municipality, Jönköping County, Sweden with 4,326 inhabitants in 2010, out of a municipal total of 9,600.

In business management, Gnosjö is known for the Gnosjö Spirit (Swedish: Gnosjöandan). Gnosjöandan describes an entrepreneurial spirit characterized by collaboration, ingenuity and relentlessness. The term originated in 1800s.

== Notable people ==
- Bengt Erlandsson, also known as Big Bengt (1922–2016), founder of wild west theme park High Chaparral
- Erik Johansson (born 1996), racing driver
- Oscar Johansson Schellhas (born 1995), professional footballer
- Stefan Kardebratt (born 1954), musician
- Uno Svenningsson (born 1959), musician

== See also ==
- Gnosjö region
