= Marieholm, Gnosjö =

Marieholm
- Location within Jönköping Location within Sweden
- Coordinates: 57°23′N 13°51′E
- Country: Sweden
- Province: Småland
- County: Jönköping County
- Municipality: Gnosjö Municipality

Area
  - Total: 0.41 km^{2} (0.16 sq mi)

Population (2005-12-31)
  - Total: 218
  - Density: 533/km^{2} (1,380/sq mi)
- Time zone: UTC+1 (CET)
  - Summer (DST): UTC+2 (CEST)

Marieholm is a village situated in Gnosjö Municipality, Jönköping County, Sweden with 218 inhabitants in 2005.
