= Army of Lovers discography =

- Studio albums: 5
- EPs: 1
- Compilation albums: 3
- Singles: 28
- Video albums: 3
- Music videos: 24

This is the discography of Army of Lovers, a Eurodance project founded in Sweden in 1987, fronted by Alexander Bard, Jean-Pierre Barda and Dominika Peczynski.

Best known internationally for their song "Crucified," Army of Lovers had success across Europe with five studio albums, four compilation albums and 33 singles.

Although their singles "Israelism", "Obsession" and "Ride The Bullet" scored chart success across Europe, their success in the US and the UK was limited, (though "Crucified" reached the top 40 in the UK Singles Chart).

== Albums ==
Title	Album details
Disco Extravaganza / Army Of Lovers (US)	Released: 1990/1991
Massive Luxury Overdose	Released: 1991
Massive Luxury Overdose (U.S. Version)	Released: 1992
The Gods Of Earth And Heaven	Released: 1993
Glory Glamour And Gold	Released: 1994
Les Greatest Hits	Released: 1995/1996
Master Series	Released: 1997
Le Grand Docu-Soap	Released: 2001
Big Battle Of Egos	Released: 2013
Massive Luxury Overdose (Ultimate Edition)	Released: 2022
Glory Glamour And Gold (Ultimate Edition)	Released: 2022
Sexodus	Released: 2023
Remixodus	Released: 2024
Sexodus (Orgasmic Edition)	Released: 2024

== Singles and EP ==
Title	Year	Peak chart positions										Album
Title	Year	^{SWE}	^{AUS}	^{GER}	^{AUT}	^{SWI}	^{NED}	^{BEL}	^{EUR}	^{UK}	^{US Dance}	Album
"When The Night Is Cold"	1988	—	—	—	—	—	—	—	—	—	—	Master Series
"Love Me Like A Loaded Gun"	1988	—	—	—	—	—	—	—	—	—	—	Disco Extravaganza
"Baby's Got A Neutron Bomb"	1989	—	—	—	—	—	—	—	—	—	—	Disco Extravaganza
"Ride The Bullet"	1990	32	191	22	4	—	2	9	40	67	—	Disco Extravaganza
"Supernatural"	1990	—	—	—	—	—	—	—	—	—	—	Disco Extravaganza
"My Army Of Lovers"	1990	—	—	—	—	—	—	—	—	—	—	Disco Extravaganza
"Crucified"	1991	8	56	5	3	6	2	1	14	31	6	Massive Luxury Overdose
"Obsession"	1991	2	108	7	7	7	9	9	29	67	11	Massive Luxury Overdose
"Candyman Messiah"	1991	22	—	—	—	—	—	—	—	—	—	Massive Luxury Overdose
"Ride The Bullet" (re-release)	1992	—	—	—	—	—	—	—	—	—	—	Massive Luxury Overdose
"Judgment Day"	1992	—	—	82	—	—	—	—	—	84	—	Massive Luxury Overdose
"Israelism"	1993	10	—	32	—	36	—	—	48	85	—	The Gods of Earth and Heaven
"La Plage De Saint Tropez"	1993	—	—	83	—	—	—	17	—	—	—	The Gods of Earth and Heaven
"I Am"	1993	—	—	—	—	—	—	—	—	96	—	The Gods of Earth and Heaven
"Lit De Parade" (featuring Big Money!)	1994	13	—	80	—	—	—	—	—	—	—	Glory Glamour and Gold
"Sexual Revolution"	1994	—	—	—	—	—	—	—	—	—	—	Glory Glamour and Gold
"Life Is Fantastic"	1994	—	—	—	—	—	—	—	—	—	—	Glory Glamour and Gold
"Give My Life"	1995	6	—	—	—	—	18	—	—	135	—	Les Greatest Hits
"Venus and Mars / Megamix"	1995	30	—	—	—	—	—	—	—	—	—	Les Greatest Hits
"King Midas"	1996	31	—	—	—	—	—	—	—	—	—	Les Greatest Hits
"Let The Sunshine In"	2001	24	—	—	—	—	—	—	—	—	—	Le Grand Docu-Soap
"Hands Up"	2001	44	—	—	—	—	—	—	—	—	—	Le Grand Docu-Soap
"Rockin' The Ride"	2013	50	—	—	—	—	—	—	—	—	—	Big Battle of Egos
"Signed On My Tattoo" (feat. Gravitonas)	2013	—	—	—	—	—	—	—	—	—	—	Big Battle of Egos
"Scandinavian Crime EP"	2013											
"Crucified 2013"	2013	—	—	—	—	—	—	—	—	—	18	Non-album single
"People Are Lonely" (Gravitonas feat. Army of Lovers)	2014	—	—	—	—	—	—	—	—	—	49	Garden of Men and Machines EP (Gravitonas) & Sexodus (Army of Lovers)
"Love Is Blue" (Army of Lovers feat. Olya Polyakova)	2023	—	—	—	—	—	—	—	—	—	—	Sexodus (Army of Lovers)
"—" denotes items that did not chart or were not released in that territory.

== Other recordings ==
- 1992 – "Hasta Mañana" – from the 1992 Swedish compilation ABBA – The Tribute. This cover was also included on the 1999 album ABBA: A Tribute – The 25th Anniversary Celebration.

== Video ==
=== Video albums ===
- Videovaganza 1990–1993 (VHS, 1993)
- Hurrah Hurrah Apocalypse: The Definitive Video Collection (DVD, 2005)

=== Music videos ===
- 1988 "When the Night Is Cold"
- 1990 "Ride the Bullet" (with La Camilla)
- 1990 "My Army of Lovers"
- 1991 "Crucified"
- 1991 "Obsession" (with La Camilla)
- 1992 "Ride the Bullet" (with Michaela)
- 1992 "Obsession" (with Michaela)
- 1992 "Judgment Day"
- 1993 "Israelism"
- 1993 "La Plage de Saint Tropez"
- 1993 "Sons of Lucy"
- 1993 "I Am"
- 1994 "Lit de Parade"
- 1994 "Sexual Revolution"
- 1995 "Give My Life"
- 1996 "King Midas"
- 2001 "Let the Sunshine In"
- 2001 "Hands Up"
- 2013 "Signed on my Tattoo" (feat. Gravitonas)
- 2013 "Crucified 2013"
- 2014 "People Are Lonely" (Gravitonas feat. Army of Lovers)
