= Big Battle of Egos =

Compilation album by Army of Lovers
- Released: March 27, 2013
- Genre: Pop, Dance
- Label: Sofo Records
- Producer: Alexander Bard

Army of Lovers chronology
Le Grand Docu-Soap (2001)	Big Battle of Egos (2013)	Sexodus (2023)

Singles from Big Battle of Egos
- 1. "Rockin' The Ride" Released: February 2013; 2. "Signed on my Tattoo" Released: June 2013

Big Battle of Egos is Army of Lovers' seventh album. It is a compilation of previous albums, including four new songs: "Rockin' The Ride", "Crashing Down", "Signed on my Tattoo" and "Tragedy". It was released throughout Europe in March 2013.

== History ==
Army of Lovers reformed with Alexander Bard, Camilla Henemark and Jean-Pierre Barda in late 2012 to enter the Melodifestivalen 2013 with the song "Rockin' the Ride", in hopes of representing Sweden in the Eurovision Song Contest 2013 in Malmö. Their entry did not reach the finals of the Melodifestivalen. Only some days after their performance Alexander Bard explained to the press, that Camilla Henemark was kicked out once again and that Dominika Peczynski returned. The kick-out was followed by a public fight between Alexander Bard and Dominika Peczynski against Camilla Henemark.

A new best-of-compilation, with four new songs, called Big Battle Of Egos was announced for release on March 27, 2013, to be followed by a single and video called Signed On My Tattoo, a duet between Army Of Lovers and fellow Swedes Gravitonas.

== New songs ==
The four new songs have limited connection to Army of Lovers previous used sound. Except for "Tragedy", all have a strong connection to the electro/dance-sound of Alexander Bard's other bands.

"Signed on My Tattoo" is a duet with his current band Gravitonas, "Crashing Down" is a cover of "Love Came Crashing Down" by Bard’s previous band BWO, and "Tragedy" is also a cover that he wrote for Malena Ernman's La Voix Du Nord album.

2 of the new songs from this compilation (Tragedy & Signed on My Tattoo) were later included on their new studio album "Sexodus" released on November 24, 2023.

== Track listing ==
1. "Rockin’ The Ride"
2. "Crashing Down"
3. "Signed On My Tattoo" (featuring Gravitonas) (Radio Edit)
4. "Give My Life" (Radio Edit)
5. "Crucified" (Radio Edit)
6. "Sexual Revolution" (Latin Radio Edit)
7. "My Army of Lovers" (Radio Edit)
8. "Lit De Parade" (Radio Edit)
9. "Obsession" (Radio Edit)
10. "Israelism" (Radio Edit)
11. "Ride the Bullet" (Radio Edit)
12. "I Am" (Radio Edit)
13. "King Midas" (Radio Edit)
14. "La Plage de Saint Tropez" (Radio Edit)
15. "Let The Sunshine In" (Radio Version)
16. "Tragedy"

== Chart performance ==
Chart (2013)	Peak position
Swedish Albums (Sverigetopplistan)	40
