= Le Grand Docu-Soap =

Compilation album by Army of Lovers
- Released: May 21, 2001
- Genre: Pop, Dance
- Label: Stockholm Records
- Producer: Alexander Bard

Army of Lovers chronology
Les Greatest Hits (1995)	Le Grand Docu-Soap (2001)	Big Battle of Egos (2013)

Singles from Le Grand Docu-Soap
- 1. "Let The Sunshine In" Released: March 2001; 2. "Hands Up" Released: June 2001

Le Grand Docu-Soap is Army of Lovers's sixth album. It is a compilation of songs from their previous albums, including three new songs: "Let The Sunshine In", "Hands Up" and "Everybody's Gotta Learn Sometime". The first two were also released as singles. It was released throughout Europe between May and August 2001.

== Track listing ==
=== CD ===
1. "Ride the Bullet" (Radio Edit)
2. "Crucified" (Radio Edit)
3. "Obsession" (Radio Edit)
4. "Give My Life" (Radio Edit)
5. "Sexual Revolution" (Latin Radio Edit)
6. "Israelism" (Radio Edit)
7. "I Am" (Radio Edit)
8. "Lit De Parade" (Radio Edit)
9. "Let the Sunshine In" (Radio Version)
10. "Life Is Fantastic" (Radio Edit)
11. "Venus and Mars" (Radio Edit)
12. "King Midas" (Radio Edit)
13. "My Army of Lovers" (Radio Edit)
14. "La Plage de Saint Tropez" (Radio Edit)
15. "Candyman Messiah" (Radio Edit)
16. "Hands Up" (Radio Version)
17. "Everybody's Gotta Learn Sometime"
18. "Supernatural" (The 1991 remix)

=== Digital download ===
1. "Ride the Bullet"
2. "Obsession"
3. "King Midas"
4. "Candyman Messiah"
5. "I Am"
6. "Crucified"
7. "Sexual Revolution"
8. "Israelism"
9. "Life Is Fantastic"
10. "La Plage de Saint Tropez"
11. "Give My Life"
12. "Venus and Mars"
13. "Everybody's Gotta Learn Sometime"
14. "Supernatural"
15. "Hands Up"
16. "My Army of Lovers"
17. "Lit De Parade"
18. "Let the Sunshine In"
19. "We Are the Universe"
20. "The Ballad of Marie Curie"
21. "Heterosexuality"
22. "Everytime You Lie"

== Le Remixed Docu-Soap ==
When the album was launched, a bonus CD called Le Remixed Docu-Soap was included and contained remix editions of their biggest hits. Later, it was sold as a separate CD in Russia. Le Remixed Docu-Soap is not available for digital download, but is available on Spotify.

=== Track listing ===
1. Ride the Bullet (Tren De Amor Mix)
2. Crucified (The Nuzak Remix)
3. Obsession (Schizoperetta Mix)
4. Give My Life (Sound Factory Mix)
5. Sexual Revolution (Latin Club Mix)
6. Israelism (Coldcalfhorahhorror Mix)
7. I Am (Post Modern Vocal Dance)
8. Lit De Parade (Plaisir De Nirvana Mix)
9. Let The Sunshine In (M12 Maximum Long Club Mix)
10. Candyman Messiah (Tolstoy Farm Mix)

== Chart performance ==
Chart (2001)	Peak position
Swedish Albums (Sverigetopplistan)	24
