= Les Greatest Hits =

Greatest hits album by Army of Lovers
- Released: October 20, 1995; March 11, 1996
- Genre: Pop; dance
- Label: Stockholm
- Producer: Alexander Bard; Per Adebratt; Anders Wollbeck

Army of Lovers chronology
Glory Glamour and Gold (1994)	Les Greatest Hits (1995)	Le Grand Docu-Soap (2001)

Singles from Les Greatest Hits
- 1. "Give My Life" Released: September 1995; 2. "Venus And Mars / Mega Mix" Released: January 1996; 3. "King Midas" Released: February 1996

Les Greatest Hits is Army of Lovers fifth album. It is a compilation of the previous albums and three new songs: "Give My Life", "Venus And Mars" and "Requiem".

== Overview ==
Two versions of the album were brought out, released in 1995 and 1996 respectively. They contain the same tracklisting, except for one song: on the 1996 version "Stand Up for Myself" was replaced with a new song, "King Midas", which also served as a last single for the group in the summer of 1996.

This album also announced the return of La Camilla to the band (as a replacement of Michaela de la Cour, who left the band).

== Track listing ==
Standard edition
No.	Title	Length
1.	"Give My Life"	3:54
2.	"Venus and Mars"	3:30
3.	"My Army of Lovers"	3:27
4.	"Ride the Bullet"	3:27
5.	"Supernatural (The 1991 remix)"	3:54
6.	"Crucified"	3:32
7.	"Obsession"	3:39
8.	"Candyman Messiah"	3:08
9.	"Judgment Day"	3:58
10.	"Everytime You Lie (La Camilla)"	3:12
11.	"Israelism"	3:22
12.	"La Plage de Saint Tropez"	3:32
13.	"I Am"	3:55
14.	"Lit de Parade"	3:28
15.	"Sexual Revolution"	3:58
16.	"Life Is Fantastic (The 1995 remix)"	4:00
17.	"Stand Up for Myself (The 1995 remix)"	3:59
18.	"Requiem"	4:31

Alternative track on the 1996 edition
No.	Title	Length
17.	"King Midas"	3:57

== Chart performance ==
In Sweden, Les Greatest Hits peaked at 40.
