= Sexodus (album) =

Studio album by Army of Lovers
- Released: November 24, 2023
- Genre: Electronic, pop
- Length: 35:35 (initial release); 42:10 (2024 reissue); 1:09:44 (Orgasmic Edition)
- Label: Bullgod Kommunikation AB (worldwide, initial digital release); Maschina (2024 reissues)

Army of Lovers chronology
Big Battle of Egos (2013)	Sexodus (2023)

Singles from Sexodus
- 1. "Love Is Blue" Released: October 6, 2023; 2. "Sexodus" Released: October 13, 2023; 3. "Romanism" Released: October 20, 2023; 4. "Bring Your Love" Released: October 27, 2023; 5. "What's That Look" Released: November 3, 2023; 6. "Israelism 2023" Released: November 10, 2023; 7. "Clash of the Titans" Released: November 17, 2023

Reissue cover
- Cover art from the vinyl reissues.

Orgasmic Edition cover
- Front of the Sexodus (Orgasmic Edition) Digipak.

Sexodus is the fifth studio album by Swedish dance-pop group Army of Lovers. It was released worldwide on November 24, 2023. In 2024, it was reissued to include two additional songs. A third reissue, titled Sexodus (Orgasmic Edition), included a bonus EP, Remixodus.

== Background ==
An idea for a 30-year anniversary album had been in talks before COVID-19, but plans fell through once the pandemic broke out. The band were motivated to continue work on the album after being contacted by Olya Polyakova, who expressed interest in collaborating with them.

The songs "Tragedy" and "Signed on My Tattoo" had originally been released on Army of Lovers' 2013 compilation album, Big Battle of Egos.

In addition to re-releases, Sexodus contains re-recordings of two previous Army of Lovers songs:

- "Israelism 2023", a remake of their hit single Israelism.
- "Clash of the Titans", a remake of "Carry My Urn to Ukraine" from the 1993 album The Gods of Earth and Heaven.

== Release ==
On November 24, 2023, Sexodus was released worldwide under the music label Bullgod Kommunikation AB. It was initially distributed via streaming services.

=== 2024 reissue ===
In 2024, Sexodus was reissued under the Estonian music label Maschina. The reissue incorporated two more songs from Army of Lovers' previous album, Big Battle of Egos.

Army of Lovers' entry for Melodifestivalen 2013, "Rockin' The Ride", was added as the eleventh track. "Crashing Down", a cover of BWO's "Love Came Crashing Down", was added as the twelfth track.

As this version was only released on vinyl and cassette, it was split so as to have six songs per side.

=== Orgasmic Edition ===
Maschina released a 2-disc Digipak titled Sexodus (Orgasmic Edition). The first disc contained all 12 tracks from the earlier reissue. The second disc was an EP titled Remixodus, composed of remixes of the first five tracks.

== Track listing ==
With the exception of "People Are Lonely", all lead vocals are provided by Alexander Bard, Jean-Pierre Barda, and Dominika Peczynski (collectively credited as Army of Lovers).

=== Original release ===
No.	Title	Lyrics	Music	Backing vocals	Length
1.	"Sexodus"	Bard, Wollbeck, Peczynski, Barda	Anders Wollbeck	Britta Bergström, Joachim Bergström	3:31
2.	"Love Is Blue" (featuring Olya Polyakova)	Bard, Hansson, Peczynski, Barda	Anders Hansson	B. Bergström, J. Bergström	3:55
3.	"What's That Look" (featuring Tamer Wilde)	Bard, Wollbeck, Peczynski, Barda	Hansson	B. Bergström, J. Bergström	3:26
4.	"Romanism"	Bard, Wollbeck, Peczynski, Barda	Wollbeck	B. Bergström, J. Bergström, Dan Bornemark, Signe Bornemark, Hjördis Bornemark	3:08
5.	"Bring Your Love"	Hansson, Bard, Ola Håkansson, Tim Norell	Hansson	B. Bergström, J. Bergström	2:57
6.	"Israelism 2023"	Bard, Wollbeck, Peczynski, Barda, Michaela de la Cour^{a}	Wollbeck	B. Bergström, J. Bergström	3:34
7.	"Clash of the Titans"	Bard, Wollbeck, Peczynski, Barda, de la Cour^{a}	Wollbeck	B. Bergström, J. Bergström	3:25
8.	"Tragedy"	Bard, Hansson, Fredrik Kempe	Hansson, Persson, Märta Grauers	Hansson, B. Bergström, Felix Persson, Helena Lillberg, Johanna Berglund, Orup	4:08
9.	"Signed on My Tattoo" (featuring Gravitonas)	Bard, Barda, Wikström, Andreas Öhrn	Henrik Wikström		3:48
10.	"People Are Lonely" (Radio Edit) (featuring Army of Lovers^{b})	Bard, Öhrn, Wikström, Barda, Stefan Örn	Wikström, Christoffer Lauridsen		3:43
Total length:					35:35

=== 2024 reissue ===
Side one
No.	Title	Length
1.	"Sexodus"	3:32
2.	"Love Is Blue" (featuring Olya Polyakova)	3:56
3.	"What's That Look" (featuring Tamer Wilde)	3:26
4.	"Romanism"	3:09
5.	"Bring Your Love"	2:58
6.	"Israelism 2023"	3:34

Side two
No.	Title	Lyrics	Music	Backing vocals	Length
1.	"Clash of the Titans"				3:25
2.	"Tragedy"				4:07
3.	"Signed on My Tattoo" (featuring Gravitonas)				3:49
4.	"People Are Lonely" (featuring Gravitonas^{b})				3:39
5.	"Rockin' The Ride"	Bard, Öhrn, Wikström, Barda, Per Ljungkvist^{c}	Wikström, Per QX^{c}	B. Bergström, Henrik Rongedal, Magnus Rongedal	3:02
6.	"Crashing Down"	Bard, Hansson, Wikström	Wikström	B. Bergström	3:33
Total length:					42:10

=== Orgasmic Edition ===
Disc one (Sexodus)
No.	Title	Length
1.	"Sexodus"	3:32
2.	"Love Is Blue" (featuring Olya Polyakova)	3:56
3.	"What's That Look" (featuring Tamer Wilde)	3:26
4.	"Romanism"	3:08
5.	"Bring Your Love"	2:58
6.	"Israelism 2023"	3:34
7.	"Clash of the Titans"	3:26
8.	"Tragedy"	4:08
9.	"Signed on My Tattoo" (featuring Gravitonas)	3:50
10.	"People Are Lonely" (featuring Gravitonas^{b})	3:44
11.	"Rockin' The Ride"	3:03
12.	"Crashing Down"	3:34
Total length:		42:19

Disc two (Remixodus EP)
No.	Title	Remixer(s)	Length
1.	"Sexodus" (Nuzak Mix)	Nuzak	4:43
2.	"Love Is Blue" (Sagi Kariv Remix) (featuring Olya Polyakova)	Sagi Kariv	4:59
3.	"What's That Look" (Anders Hansson Remix) (featuring Tamer Wilde)	Anders Hansson	6:34
4.	"Romanism" (SoundFactory Remix)	Emil Hellman	5:33
5.	"Bring Your Love" (Maxim Andreev Remix)	Maxim Andreev	5:36
Total length:			27:25

== Notes ==
a. Michaela de la Cour was no longer a member of the band at the time of the album's creation; however, this song is a re-recording of one she has writing credits on.
b. This song was originally released in 2014 by Gravitonas, but was incorporated into Sexodus; lead vocals are provided by both Gravitonas and Army of Lovers. Physical distributions of Sexodus list "People Are Lonely" as an Army of Lovers song, featuring Gravitonas.
c. Per QX is Ljungkvist's stage name; this album credits him under his real name for writing, but under his stage name for keyboards and programming.
