= Glory Glamour and Gold =

Studio album by Army of Lovers
- Released: September 30, 1994
- Genre: Pop, dance
- Length: 52:35
- Label: Stockholm Records
- Producer: Alexander Bard, Per Adebratt, Anders Wollbeck

Army of Lovers chronology
The Gods of Earth and Heaven (1993)	Glory Glamour and Gold (1994)	Les Greatest Hits (1995)

Singles from Glory Glamour and Gold
- 1. "Lit de Parade" Released: August 1994; 2. "Sexual Revolution" Released: November 1994; 3. "Life Is Fantastic" Released: April 1995

Professional ratings
Review scores
Source	Rating
AllMusic	4.5/5 stars
Music & Media	Positive

Glory Glamour and Gold was Army of Lovers' fourth studio album, released in 1994. The next three albums would be compilations, each containing a few new songs. Three singles were released from this album; "Lit de Parade", "Sexual Revolution", and "Life is Fantastic".

The most successful song was "Lit de Parade", peaking at number 13 on the Swedish music charts.

== Critical reception ==
Pan-European magazine Music & Media wrote:

Ancien regime campiness isn't dead, mesdames et messieurs. Over the top as always, this time the Sexual Revolution is proclaimed by the extravagant quartet. "Stand together black and white. Sleep united, hold on tight tonight." The music itself doesn't match their bizarre looks anymore. Only time will tell if it will earn or cost them airplay. With most tracks it could go either way, but the reggae tune Mr Battyman is a sure winner.

== Track listing ==
No.	Title	Lyrics	Music	Producer(s)	Length
1.	"Hurrah Hurrah Apocalypse"	Alexander Bard, Anders Wollbeck, Vasa	Wollbeck, Per Adebratt, Vasa	Vacuum	5:33
2.	"Sexual Revolution" (featuring Annette and Giovanna Bragazzi)	Bard, Wollbeck, Dominika Peczynski, Jean-Pierre Barda, Michaela Dornonville de la Cour	Wollbeck, Adebratt	Bard, Wollbeck, Adebratt	3:47
3.	"Stand Up for Myself"	Bard, Wollbeck, Adebratt	Wollbeck, Adebratt	Bard, Wollbeck, Adebratt	4:02
4.	"Lit de Parade" (featuring Big Money!) (Video Edit)	Wollbeck, Barda, Bard, Ola Håkansson, Tim Norell, Vasa	Wollbeck, Adebratt, Norell, Mårten Kellerman	Vacuum	3:16
5.	"Life Is Fantastic"	Bard, Wollbeck, Dornonville de la Cour	Wollbeck, Adebratt	Bard, Wollbeck, Adebratt	4:04
6.	"Mr. Battyman"	Bard, Wollbeck, Peczynski, Barda, Dornonville de la Cour, Adebratt	Wollbeck, Adebratt, Bard	Bard, Wollbeck, Adebratt	3:12
7.	"C'est Démon"	Bard, Wollbeck	Wollbeck, Adebratt	Bard, Wollbeck, Adebratt	3:34
8.	"Shine Like a Star" (featuring Annette)	Bard, Wollbeck, Peczynski, Barda	Wollbeck, Adebratt	Bard, Wollbeck, Adebratt	3:41
9.	"You've Come a Long Way Baby"	Bard, Wollbeck, Peczynski, Barda	Wollbeck, Adebratt	Bard, Wollbeck, Adebratt	6:07
10.	"Ballrooms of Versailles" (featuring Giovanna Bragazzi)	Bard, Wollbeck, Peczynski, Barda	Wollbeck, Adebratt	Bard, Wollbeck, Adebratt	3:27
11.	"Dub Evolution" (featuring Annette and Giovanna Bragazzi)			Anders Hansson	4:21
12.	"Like a Virgin Sacrified" (featuring Annette)	Bard, Wollbeck, Peczynski, Barda, Dornonville de la Cour	Wollbeck, Adebratt	Bard, Wollbeck, Adebratt	4:04
13.	"Lit de Parade" (featuring Big Money!) (Radio Edit)			Hansson	3:27
Total length:					52:35

== Chart positions ==
Lit de Parade
Chart (1994)	Peak position
Sweden (Sverigetopplistan)	13
Germany	80

== Credits ==
- Vocals, bass: Dominika Peczynski
- Vocals, drums: Jean-Pierre Barda
- Vocals, guitar: Alexander Bard
- Vocals, keyboards: Michaela Dornonville de la Cour
- Choir: The Army Tabernacle Choir (The 69 Caruso, Rikhard Evenlind,^{a} Erika Essen-Möller, Lilling Palmeklint, Lotten Andersson, Malin Bäckström)

== Notes ==
a. The 69 Caruso is Evenlind's stage name.
