= The Gods of Earth and Heaven =

Studio album by Army of Lovers
- Released: June 1, 1993
- Genre: Pop, dance
- Label: Stockholm
- Producer: Alexander Bard; Per Adebratt; Anders Wollbeck

Army of Lovers chronology
Massive Luxury Overdose (1991)	The Gods of Earth and Heaven (1993)	Glory Glamour and Gold (1994)

Singles from The Gods of Earth and Heaven
- 1. "Israelism" Released: March 1993; 2. "La Plage de Saint Tropez" Released: June 1993; 3. "I Am" Released: September 1993; 4. "Sons of Lucy" Released: December 1993

The Gods of Earth and Heaven is Swedish band Army of Lovers' third studio album. It was the first album, after the replacement of La Camilla by Michaela de la Cour and the introduction of new member Dominika Peczynski. It contains the hit singles "Israelism" and "La Plage de Saint Tropez". "Israelism" was banned from MTV for allegedly making fun of Jewish culture (despite the fact that two of the band members were Jewish). The album didn't perform as well as Massive Luxury Overdose. Album charted 20 weeks and peaked at number eight in Finnish Albums Chart Top-40. In the end of June 1993, Army of Lovers performed in several TV shows in France, Spain and Italy.

The first single released from the album, "Israelism", is about Jean-Pierre Barda finding his way back to his Jewish culture and history.

== Critical reception ==
Professional ratings
Review scores
Source	Rating
AllMusic	4.5/5 stars
The Encyclopedia of Popular Music	2/5 stars
Music Week	1/5 stars
NME	7/10

In his review of the single "I Am", Larry Flick from Billboard magazine wrote, "Kitschy Swedish disco/pop act returns with a record that is a lot more sonically subtle than past efforts, though biting and humorous lyrics remain a primary element." In his review of the album, Alan Jones from Music Week wrote, "Myriad Influences — opera, cabaret, Hi-NRG, classical, pop and rap to name but a few — collide in a way that will endear few on The Gods of Earth and Heaven. The camp Swedish-based group's single "Israelism" has attracted some attention, but this album you order at your peril." Stephen Dalton from NME compared Army of Lovers with ABBA, saying, "Tabernacle choirs, string quartets, folk music maestros and even an entire orchestra: meticulous attention to detail which almost qualifies this Stockholm-based foursome as — whisper quietly — the new Abba. [...] Army of Lovers are Doctor Zhivago set to a relentless disco beat, a bawdy historical romp stuffed with futuristic techno slammers and throbbing rude bits. Abba on drugs with their knobs out, basically."

== Track listing ==
Standard edition
No.	Title	Length
1.	"Chihuahuas on Parade"	0:41
2.	"We Are the Universe"	3:41
3.	"La Plage de Saint Tropez"	3:32
4.	"I Am"	3:54
5.	"Le Portrait de Jean-Pierre"	0:44
6.	"Israelism"	3:20
7.	"The Grand Fatigue"	3:32
8.	"Carry My Urn to Ukraine"	4:04
9.	"Sebastien"	3:33
10.	"La Storia di O"	0:45
11.	"Blood in the Chapel"	3:16
12.	"The Ballad of Marie Curie"	3:48
13.	"Heterosexuality"	4:10
14.	"Sons of Lucy"	3:02
15.	"Also Sprach Alexander"	0:35
16.	"The Day the Gods Help Us All"	3:45

== Credits ==
- Choir [The Army Tabernacle Choir Features] – The 69 Caruso, Erika Essen-Möller, Lilling Palmeklint, Malin Bäckström, Ricco (3)
- Coordinator [Promotion] – Jonas Holst
- Directed By [Video Clips] – Fredrik Boklund
- Engineer, Programmed By [Additional] – Per Adebratt
- Executive-Producer – Ola Håkansson
- Film Producer [Video Clips] – Martin Persson
- Keyboards, Programmed By, Guitar – Anders Wollbeck
- Management – Anders Bladh
- Mastered By – Björn Engelman
- Producer, Mixed By – Alexander Bard, Anders Wollbeck, Per Adebratt
- Supervised By [Project Supervisor] – Eric Hasselqvist
- Vocals, Bass – Dominika Peczynski
- Vocals, Drums – Jean-Pierre Barda
- Vocals, Guitar – Alexander Bard
- Vocals, Keyboards – Michaela de la Cour

== Charts ==
Chart performance for The Gods of Earth and Heaven
Chart (1993)	Peak position
Finnish Albums (Suomen virallinen lista)	8
Hungarian Albums (MAHASZ)	32
Swedish Albums (Sverigetopplistan)	36
