= Give My Life =

Single by Army of Lovers

from the album Les Greatest Hits
- Released: September 1995
- Studio: Eclectic Music Studios, Stockholm
- Genre: Dance-pop
- Label: Stockholm Records
- Songwriters: Alexander Bard; Tim Norell; Jean-Pierre Barda
- Producer: Anders Hansson

Army of Lovers singles chronology
"Life is Fantastic" (1995)	"Give My Life" (1995)	"Venus and Mars / Megamix" (1996)

Music video
- "Give My Life" on YouTube

Music video
- "Give My Life" (US Only) on YouTube

"Give My Life" is a song written by Alexander Bard and Tim Norell from Norell Oson Bard and Jean-Pierre Barda. It was recorded by the Swedish group Army of Lovers, and released in September 1995 by Stockholm Records as the first single from their first compilation album, Les Greatest Hits (1995). It also was their first single after the return of La Camilla Henemark to the group, scoring a 1995/1996 hit. The single charted for 18 weeks in Sweden and 23 weeks in the Netherlands. It also charted on the Swedish Trackslistan and reached number 135 on the UK Singles Chart.

== Critical reception ==
Pan-European magazine Music & Media wrote, "Now the prodigal daughter has returned to the line-up, and to judge by airplay action in Finland, Denmark, Germany and Austria, the new single 'Give My Life' is bound to become their biggest hit since 'Crucified' (1991) and 'Obsession' (1992). [...] The new single, one of the five new tracks on the 18-track album, marks a new stylistic element—African high life music, which blends very well with their trademark pop dance style. Lots of stations are expected to surrender to this army."

== Track listing ==
- 12" maxi-single (Sweden, 1995)
1. "Give My Life" (Sound Factory Mix) - 6:36
2. "Give My Life" (Love Society Mix) - 5:28
3. "Give My Life" (Temple Of Doom Mix) - 8:41
4. "Give My Life" (Radio Edit) - 3:54
- 12" maxi-single (UK, 1996)
1. "Give My Life" (Flexifinger's Five Gates Of Hell Mix) - 6:24
2. "Give My Life" (Temple Of Doom Mix) - 8:41
3. "Crucified" (Candygirls Remix) - 8:07
- CD-single (Sweden, 1995)
1. "Give My Life" (Radio Edit) - 3:54
2. "Stand Up For Myself" (The 1995 Remix) - 3:59
- CD-maxi (UK, 1996)
1. "Give My Life" (Radio Edit) - 3:54
2. "Give My Life" (Flexifinger's Five Gates Of Hell Mix) - 6:24
3. "Crucified" (Candygirls Remix) - 8:07

== Charts ==
=== Weekly charts ===
Chart (1995–1996)	Peak position
Netherlands (Dutch Top 40)	18
Netherlands (Single Top 100)	23
Sweden (Sverigetopplistan)	6
UK Singles (OCC)	135
UK Pop Tip Club Chart (Music Week)	15

=== Year-end charts ===
Chart (1995)	Position
Sweden (Topplistan)	40
