= Midi, Maxi & Efti =

Swedish musical group

Midi, Maxi & Efti was a Swedish musical group with African influences from the early 1990s. Their two biggest hits were «Bad Bad Boys» and «Ragga Steady».

The band consisted of the two twin sisters Tsedey "Midi" Berhanu and Selam "Maxi" Berhanu and their friend Freweyni "Efti" Teclehaimanot, all of them born in 1976. Midi and Maxi were refugees from Ethiopia and came to Sweden with their parents in 1985. Efti was born in a refugee camp in Eritrea and also arrived in Sweden in 1985. The three girls met in the Stockholm suburb of Akalla.

Their self-titled album was released in 1991 and spawned three singles, "Bad Bad Boys" (#11 in SWE, #98 US), "Ragga Steady" (#22 in SWE), and "Masenko" (#39 in SWE). Although the girls contributed lyrics, most of the Africa-inspired songs were in fact composed and produced by the men behind Army of Lovers – Alexander Bard, Anders Wollbeck and Per Adebratt, assisted by E-type and Stakka Bo. Styling was done by Jean-Pierre Barda and Camilla Thulin.

In 1992, the album was released in the U.S. by Columbia Records, and a video was made for «Ragga Steady», directed by Frank Sacramento. The band split up after a few short tours of the United States, South Africa and France.

Their songs have been featured in the TV series Beavis and Butthead and the movies For Love or Money (starring Michael J. Fox) and Untamed Heart. The members have since recorded songs separately, but nothing has been released.

«Bad Bad Boys» has been included in the soundtrack of the Brazilian 1993 soap opera Mulheres de Areia.

In Canada, comedian and musician François Pérusse parodied the song "Bad Bad Boys" on his album L'Album du peuple — tome 2, changing the lyrics to praise the outstanding 1992 Montreal Expos season.

Also song "Go Girlie Go" was parodied by Russian punk band Sektor Gaza under the name Ария Ивана и Лягушки (Aria of Ivan and Frog) and this version was included to their 1994 'punk opera' album Кащей Бессмертный (Kashchey The Immortal), where Russian fairy-tale story became a subject of obscene content parody.
