= Candyman Messiah =

Single by Army of Lovers

from the album Massive Luxury Overdose
- B-side: "Candyman Messiah (Dub Version)"
- Released: November 1991
- Recorded: Sonet Studios, Stockholm
- Genre: Synth-pop ⋅ electronic
- Length: 3:08
- Label: Ton Son Ton
- Songwriters: Alexander Bard; Anders Wollbeck; Camilla Henemark; Jean-Pierre Barda
- Producers: Alexander Bard; Anders Wollbeck

Army of Lovers singles chronology
"Obsession" (1991)	"Candyman Messiah" (1991)	"Ride the Bullet" (1992)

Music video
- "Candyman Messiah" on YouTube

"Candyman Messiah" is a song by Army of Lovers and released as a single in 1991. This song is written by Alexander Bard, Anders Wollbeck, Camilla Henemark and Jean-Pierre Barda. It peaked at number 22 in Sweden and number 10 in Finland. Michaela de la Cour was featured in the video following La Camilla's departure from the band.

== Single track listing ==
7" single

1. "Candyman Messiah" (Radio Edit) - 3:08
2. "Candyman Messiah" (Dub Version) - 4:45

12" maxi-single

1. "Candyman Messiah" (Stalingrad Mix) - 5:36
2. "Candyman Messiah" (Radio Edit) - 3:08
3. "Candyman Messiah" (Tolstoy Farm Mix) - 5:35
4. "Candyman Messiah" (Orthodoxicated Mix) - 4:45

== Charts ==
Chart (1991–1992)	Peak position
Finland (IFPI)	10
Sweden (Sverigetopplistan)	22
