= King Midas (disambiguation) =

King Midas may refer to:

- Midas, name of at least three members of the royal house of Phrygia (one of which had the mythological ability to turn anything he touched into gold)
- King Midas, a 1996 song by Swedish band Army of Lovers
- King Midas (band), a Norwegian musical group
- King Midas Sound, a musical project by British musician Kevin Martin
- "King Midas In Reverse", song by British group The Hollies
