= Mario Ančić =

Croatian tennis player (born 1984)

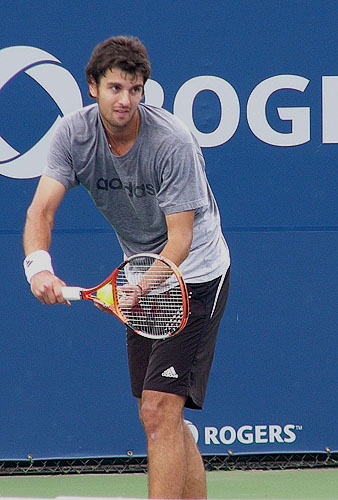
- Ančić at Canada Masters, July 2008
- Country (sports): Croatia
- Residence: Monte Carlo, Monaco
- Born: 30 March 1984 (age 41) Split, SR Croatia, SFR Yugoslavia
- Height: 1.95 m (6 ft 5 in)
- Turned pro: 2001
- Retired: 2011
- Plays: Right-handed (two-handed backhand)
- Prize money: $4,024,686

Singles
- Career record: 208–135
- Career titles: 3
- Highest ranking: No. 7 (10 July 2006)

Grand Slam singles results
- Australian Open: 4R (2003, 2007)
- French Open: QF (2006)
- Wimbledon: SF (2004)
- US Open: 2R (2005)

Other tournaments
- Tour Finals: Alt (2006)
- Olympic Games: 1R (2004)

Doubles
- Career record: 68–42
- Career titles: 5
- Highest ranking: No. 47 (14 June 2004)

Grand Slam doubles results
- Australian Open: 2R (2004)
- French Open: 3R (2004)
- Wimbledon: 1R (2003)
- US Open: QF (2003)

Team competitions
- Davis Cup: W (2005)
Medal record
Olympic Games
Bronze medal – third place	2004 Athens	Doubles
- Last updated on: 28 September 2021.

Mario Ančić (Croatian pronunciation: [mâːrio âːntʃitɕ]; born 30 March 1984) is a Croatian former professional tennis player who currently works as a private equity vice president in New York City. He won three singles titles and five doubles titles on the ATP Tour. Ančić's career-high singles ranking came in 2006, when he reached world No. 7. Ančić helped Croatia to win the 2005 Davis Cup and claimed a bronze medal for the country at the 2004 Athens Olympics, in men's doubles partnering Ivan Ljubičić.

As a teenager making his major debut at the 2002 Wimbledon Championships, he defeated seventh-seeded Roger Federer. His best performance at the majors came at the 2004 Wimbledon Championships, when he reached the semifinals. During 2007 and 2008, infectious mononucleosis and minor injuries forced him to miss many major events, and his ranking dropped from No. 9 in January 2007 to No. 135 in January 2008.

== Personal life ==
Ančić was born in Split, Croatia to Stipe and Nilda Ančić. His father owns a supermarket chain, and his mother is a financial adviser. His older brother Ivica and younger sister Sanja were also professional tennis players. Ančić was raised in a Catholic family and states that his faith is very important to him. He is very close to his uncle who is a priest and former missionary.

== Legal and business career ==
From 2002 to 2008, Ančić was a law student at the University of Split; he graduated from its law school on 14 April 2008. His thesis described the legal foundation and organisation of the ATP Tour.

Infectious mononucleosis forced Ančić to be off courts in much of the 2009 tennis season, and he started his residency in the law office of Turudić in Zagreb; but he announced he would freeze his residency for some time due to his tennis career. After attending Harvard Law, he graduated with an LLM from Columbia Law School. He became an investment banking associate at Credit Suisse; as of 2019 he is an Associate at One Equity Partners in New York City.

== Tennis career ==
=== Early career (2000–2002) ===
As a junior, Ančić rose to No. 1 in the junior world-rankings on 2 January 2001, compiling a singles record of 62–20. He made the finals in the Boys' Singles at the 2000 Australian Open (losing to Andy Roddick) and the 2000 Wimbledon Championships (losing to Nicolas Mahut).

Goran Ivanišević was his doubles partner in his Croatian Davis Cup Team debut and at the 2000 Summer Olympic Games in doubles. At first, Ančić mostly played Futures and Davis Cup tournaments, winning one title in Zagreb; and from August 2001 he started to play Challenger tournaments, winning four in singles and one in doubles. He compiled a record of 30–16 in Challenger play in 2002.

=== ATP Tour career (2002–2005) ===
His ATP debut was at Miami Masters, where he drew a wild card, but he lost in the opening round. The highlight of his Grand Slam debut at the 2002 Wimbledon Championships was the major upset of his first round defeat of Roger Federer, the seventh seed, 6–3, 7–6^{(2)}, 6–3 in just under two hours. He finished the 2002 season in the top 100 in singles.

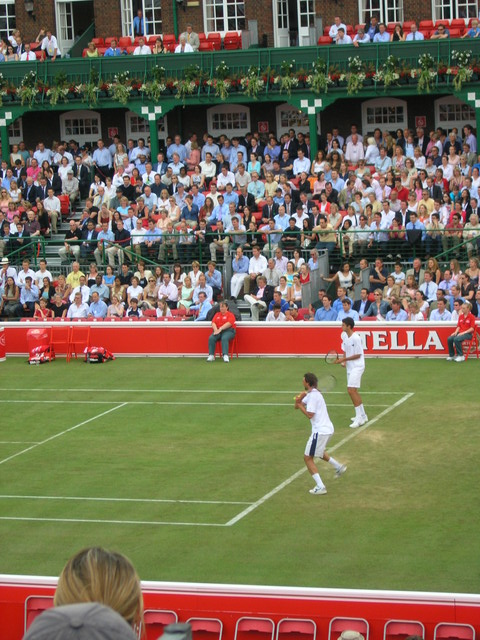
Goran Ivanišević and Mario Ančić playing doubles during the 2004 Queen's Club Championships

At the ATP Indesit Milano Indoor in February 2004, Ančić made it into his first singles ATP final, defeating sixth seed Rafael Nadal and third seed Tommy Robredo. At the 2004 Wimbledon Championships, Ančić had his best Grand Slam result, reaching the semi-finals. In reaching the Grand Slam semi-finals, he jumped 36 places on the ATP singles ranking to No. 27. In doubles, he teamed up with Ivan Ljubičić, and represented Croatia at the 2004 Summer Olympics. They won a bronze medal, losing to González and Nicolás Massú in the semi-final. He won his first ATP singles title at the Ordina Open. His 2005 highlights also include the final at the Japan Open Tennis Championships, losing to Wesley Moodie.

=== Career apex (2006) ===
Ančić started on the 2006 ATP Tour with strong note in his second tournament of the year in Auckland, where he defeated top seed Fernando González on his way to the final. In February, he also reached the final in Marseille, losing to Arnaud Clément. He made in the quarter-finals at two Masters and two Grand Slams tournaments. Ančić was defeated by David Nalbandian at Miami and Rome and by Roger Federer at the French Open and Wimbledon. He also reached his career high at Master Series event, reaching the semi-finals at Hamburg Masters. Ančić successfully defended his 2005 title at 's-Hertogenbosch. After Wimbledon, Ančić reached No. 7, his career high in singles.

At the 2006 French Open, he had a shoving incident with Paul Capdeville at the end of his second-round match. Ančić was bothered by the Chilean's repeated complaints to the chair umpire, including just before the post-match handshake. Both of them were fined $3,000. He reached the quarter-finals before losing to Federer.

Ančić missed the U.S. hard-court season due to a knee injury received in a jet skiing accident. In September, in the first event after the summer injuries, he reached the final at the China Open, losing to Marcos Baghdatis. In October, he won his third singles title at the St. Petersburg Open. At the Paris Masters, Ančić lost to Nikolay Davydenko in the quarterfinals.

=== Mononucleosis, and return to the Tour (2007–2010) ===
He entered the 2007 Australian Open as the ninth seed, and advanced to a fourth round.

In Marseille, Ančić retired in the first round and was diagnosed with infectious mononucleosis (mono). Later, he confessed that he was playing sick a week before in a match against Germany in the Davis Cup, and the virus had started to affect him at the Australian Open. Due to his illness, Ančić spent most of the next 10 weeks in bed and missed six months from the tour.

Ančić started training in June with his Swedish coach Fredrik Rosengren. After he withdrew from two tournaments in July, Ančić returned in August at the Canada Masters and the Cincinnati Masters, where he lost in the second rounds. Ančić fractured a small bone at the gym a week before the US Open, which was the third Grand Slam he missed in 2007. In October, he made his first big result after the illness, making it into the quarterfinals at Madrid Masters. In 2007, he dropped to No. 83 at the end of the year.

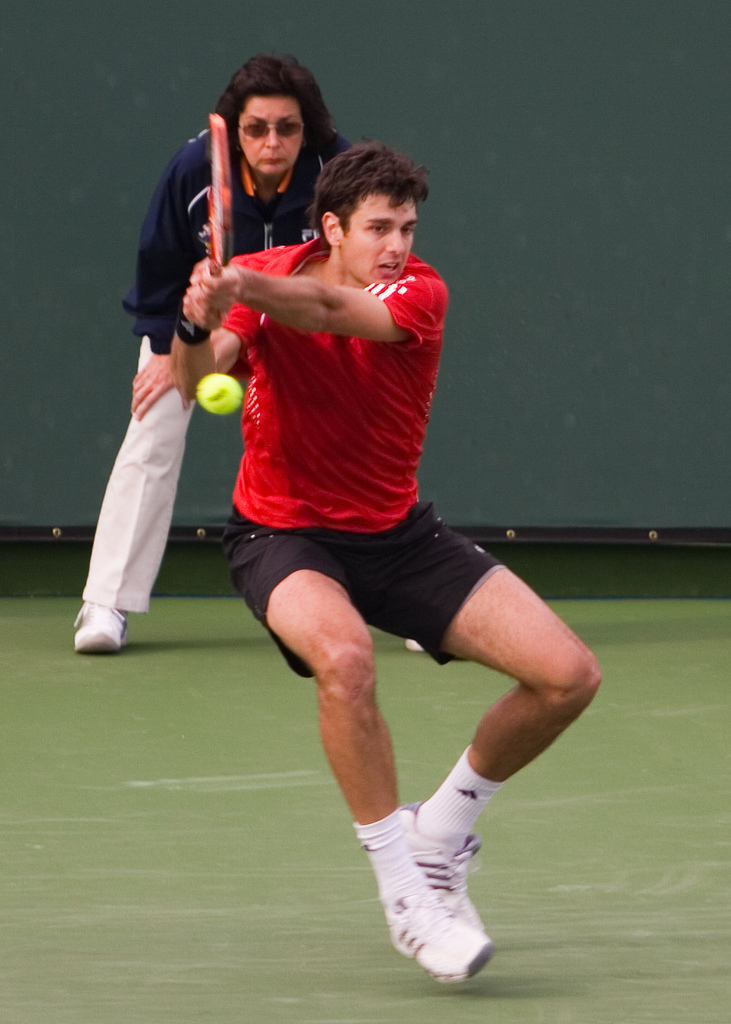
Ančić hitting a backhand at the 2008 Indian Wells Masters

Ančić started the 2008 season again with illness and was forced to withdraw from the tournaments in Australia, missing his fourth Grand Slam in a row. His first 2008 event was in Marseille in February, where he eventually lost in the final to Andy Murray. At the Indian Wells Masters and Miami Masters, Ančić entered the main draw by receiving wild cards, where he beat three seeded players.

Having lost in an opening round at the Canada Masters, and having skipped the Cincinnati Masters as the fatigue intensified and the weight loss mounted, Ančić withdrew from the 2008 Summer Olympics, and later the US Open, due to a recurrence of mononucleosis. Ančić returned in September, playing for the Davis Cup. After a good start at the beginning of the 2009 season, Ančić announced in May that he would pull out of the French Open, Wimbledon, and the Davis Cup semifinal match, again because recurrence of mononucleosis.

Ančić returned to the main tour level at the 2010 BNP Paribas Open, where he made it to the third round. He played Challengers without success.

=== Retirement ===
On 21 February 2011, Ančić announced his retirement from professional tennis due to recurring mononucleosis. He ended his career with three titles, 208 wins and 135 losses. On 23 February 2011, Ančić held a press conference at the Firule tennis club, where he officially retired from professional tennis. He stated that; "[My] heart wanted, but [my] body couldn't, this is the toughest moment of my life. I have never run away from responsibility. I always strived for perfection, and when I realized that my body cannot provide the kind of tennis I can play, there was no other solution".

== Significant finals ==
=== Olympics medal matches ===
==== Doubles: 1 (1 bronze medal) ====
Result	Year	Tournament	Surface	Partner	Opponents	Score
Bronze	2004	Athens, Greece	Hard	(Croatia) Ivan Ljubičić	(India) Mahesh Bhupathi (India) Leander Paes	7–6^{(7–5)}, 4–6, 16–14

== ATP career finals ==
=== Singles: 11 (3 titles, 8 runner-ups) ===
Legend Grand Slam tournaments (0–0) ATP World Tour finals (0–0) ATP World Tour Masters 1000 (0–0) ATP World Tour 500 Series (0–1) ATP World Tour 250 Series (3–7)	Titles by surface Hard (0–7) Clay (0–0) Grass (2–0) Carpet (1–1)	Titles by setting Outdoor (2–3) Indoor (1–5)

Result	W–L	Date	Tournament	Tier	Surface	Opponent	Score
Loss	0–1	Feb 2004	Milan, Italy	International Series	Carpet	(France) Antony Dupuis	4–6, 7–6^{(14–12)}, 6–7^{(5–7)}
Loss	0–2	Feb 2005	Scottsdale, United States	International Series	Hard	(Australia) Wayne Arthurs	5–7, 3–6
Win	1–2	Jun 2005	's-Hertogenbosch, Netherlands	International Series	Grass	(France) Michaël Llodra	7–5, 6–4
Loss	1–3	Oct 2005	Tokyo, Japan	International Gold	Hard	(South Africa) Wesley Moodie	6–1, 6–7^{(7–9)}, 4–6
Loss	1–4	Jan 2006	Auckland, New Zealand	International Series	Hard	(Finland) Jarkko Nieminen	2–6, 2–6
Loss	1–5	Feb 2006	Marseille, France	International Series	Hard	(France) Arnaud Clément	4–6, 2–6
Win	2–5	Jun 2006	's-Hertogenbosch, Netherlands	International Series	Grass	(Czech Republic) Jan Hernych	6–0, 5–7, 7–5
Loss	2–6	Sep 2006	Beijing, China	International Series	Hard	(Cyprus) Marcos Baghdatis	4–6, 0–6
Win	3–6	Oct 2006	St. Petersburg, Russia	International Series	Carpet	(Sweden) Thomas Johansson	7–5, 7–6^{(7–2)}
Loss	3–7	Feb 2008	Marseille, France	International Series	Hard	(United Kingdom) Andy Murray	3–6, 4–6
Loss	3–8	Feb 2009	Zagreb, Croatia	250 Series	Hard	(Croatia) Marin Čilić	3–6, 4–6

=== Doubles: 5 (5 titles) ===
Legend Grand Slam tournaments (0–0) ATP World Tour finals (0–0) ATP World Tour Masters 1000 (0–0) ATP World Tour 500 Series (0–0) ATP World Tour 250 Series (5–0)	Titles by surface Hard (3–0) Clay (1–0) Grass (1–0) Carpet (0–0)	Titles by setting Outdoor (5–0) Indoor (0–0)

Result	W–L	Date	Tournament	Tier	Surface	Partner	Opponents	Score
Win	1–0	Jul 2003	Indianapolis, United States	International Series	Hard	(Israel) Andy Ram	(United States) Diego Ayala (United States) Robby Ginepri	2–6, 7–6^{(7–3)}, 7–5
Win	2–0	May 2005	Munich, Germany	International Series	Clay	(Austria) Julian Knowle	(Germany) Florian Mayer (Germany) Alexander Waske	6–3, 1–6, 6–3
Win	3–0	Sep 2006	Beijing, China	International Series	Hard	(India) Mahesh Bhupathi	(Germany) Michael Berrer (Denmark) Kenneth Carlsen	6–4, 6–3
Win	4–0	Oct 2006	Mumbai, India	International Series	Hard	(India) Mahesh Bhupathi	(India) Rohan Bopanna (India) Mustafa Ghouse	6–4, 6–7^{(6–8)}, [10–8]
Win	5–0	Jun 2008	's-Hertogenbosch, Netherlands	International Series	Grass	(Austria) Jürgen Melzer	(India) Mahesh Bhupathi (India) Leander Paes	7–6^{(7–5)}, 6–3

== ATP Challenger and ITF Futures finals ==
=== Singles: 10 (5–5) ===
Legend ATP Challenger (4–2) ITF Futures (1–3)	Finals by surface Hard (2–4) Clay (0–0) Grass (0–0) Carpet (3–1)

Result	W–L	Date	Tournament	Tier	Surface	Opponent	Score
Win	1–0	Feb 2000	Croatia F2, Zagreb	Futures	Hard	(Croatia) Ivo Karlović	7–6^{(16–14)}, 6–4
Loss	1–1	May 2001	China F2, Kunming City	Futures	Hard	(Switzerland) Yves Allegro	4–6, 6–7^{(4–7)}
Loss	1–2	Jul 2001	Canada F3, Lachine	Futures	Hard	(France) Benjamin Cassaigne	6–7^{(3–7)}, 5–7
Win	2–2	Feb 2002	Belgrade, Yugoslavia	Challenger	Carpet	(Socialist Federal Republic of Yugoslavia) Nenad Zimonjić	6–2, 6–3
Loss	2–3	Mar 2002	Ho Chi Minh City, Vietnam	Challenger	Hard	(Japan) Takao Suzuki	4–6, 3–6
Loss	2–4	Mar 2002	Kyoto, Japan	Challenger	Carpet	(Japan) Takao Suzuki	7–6^{(7–4)}, 2–6, 2–6
Win	3–4	Nov 2002	Prague, Czech Republic	Challenger	Hard	(France) Jérôme Golmard	6–1, 6–1
Win	4–4	Dec 2002	Milan, Italy	Challenger	Carpet	(France) Gregory Carraz	4–6, 6–3, 7–6^{(10–8)}
Win	5–4	Feb 2003	Hamburg, Germany	Challenger	Carpet	(Spain) Rafael Nadal	6–2, 6–3
Loss	5–5	Mar 2010	USA F7, McAllen	Futures	Hard	(Russia) Artem Sitak	1–6, 4–6

=== Doubles: 7 (3–4) ===
Legend ATP Challenger (2–3) ITF Futures (1–1)	Finals by surface Hard (2–3) Clay (1–0) Grass (0–0) Carpet (0–1)

Result	W–L	Date	Tournament	Tier	Surface	Partner	Opponents	Score
Win	1–0	Feb 2000	Croatia F1, Zagreb	Futures	Hard	(Croatia) Ivica Ančić	(Croatia) Roko Karanušić (Croatia) Zeljko Krajan	6–4, 5–7, 7–5
Loss	1–1	May 2001	Japan F5, Fukuoka	Futures	Hard	(Croatia) Ivica Ančić	(Japan) Yaoki Ishii (Japan) Takahiro Terachi	4–6, 3–6
Loss	1–2	Mar 2002	Kyoto, Japan	Challenger	Carpet	(Croatia) Lovro Zovko	(Finland) Tuomas Ketola (Germany) Alexander Waske	4–6, 4–6
Win	2–2	Nov 2002	Helsinki, Finland	Challenger	Hard	(Croatia) Lovro Zovko	(North Macedonia) Aleksandar Kitinov (United States) Jim Thomas	7–6^{(8–6)}, 4–6, 6–3
Loss	2–3	Nov 2003	Bratislava, Slovakia	Challenger	Hard	(Argentina) Martin Garcia	(Israel) Harel Levy (Israel) Jonathan Erlich	6–7^{(7–9)}, 3–6
Loss	2–4	Jan 2010	Heilbronn, Germany	Challenger	Hard	(Croatia) Lovro Zovko	(Thailand) Sonchat Ratiwatana (Thailand) Sanchai Ratiwatana	4–6, 5–7
Win	3–4	Apr 2010	Rome, Italy	Challenger	Clay	(Croatia) Ivan Dodig	(Argentina) Juan Pablo Brzezicki (Spain) Rubén Ramírez Hidalgo	4–6, 7–6^{(10–8)}, [10–4]

== Junior Grand Slam finals ==
=== Singles: 2 (2 runner-ups) ===
Result	Year	Tournament	Surface	Opponent	Score
Loss	2000	Australian Open	Hard	(United States) Andy Roddick	6–7^{(2–7)}, 3–6
Loss	2000	Wimbledon	Grass	(France) Nicolas Mahut	6–3, 3–6, 5–7

== Performance timelines ==
Key
W	F	SF	QF	#R	RR	Q#	DNQ	A	NH

(W) winner; (F) finalist; (SF) semifinalist; (QF) quarterfinalist; (#R) rounds 4, 3, 2, 1; (RR) round-robin stage; (Q#) qualification round; (DNQ) did not qualify; (A) absent; (NH) not held; (SR) strike rate (events won / competed); (W–L) win–loss record.

=== Singles ===
Tournament	2002	2003	2004	2005	2006	2007	2008	2009	2010	SR	W–L	Win %
Grand Slam tournaments
Australian Open	A	4R	3R	3R	3R	4R	A	3R	A	0 / 6	14–6	70%
French Open	Q1	2R	3R	3R	QF	A	3R	A	A	0 / 5	11–5	71%
Wimbledon	2R	1R	SF	4R	QF	A	QF	A	A	0 / 6	17–6	74%
US Open	1R	1R	1R	2R	A	A	A	A	A	0 / 4	1–4	20%
Win–loss	1–2	4–4	9–4	8–4	10–3	3–1	6–2	2–1	0–0	0 / 21	43–21	67%
Olympic Games
Summer Olympics	not held		1R	not held			A	not held		0 / 1	0–1	0%
ATP Tour Masters 1000
Indian Wells Masters	A	1R	1R	2R	4R	A	3R	2R	3R	0 / 7	7–7	50%
Miami Open	1R	1R	Q1	4R	QF	A	4R	A	1R	0 / 6	8–6	57%
Monte Carlo	A	Q1	A	2R	A	A	2R	A	A	0 / 2	2–2	50%
Rome	A	Q1	1R	1R	QF	A	2R	A	A	0 / 4	4–4	50%
Madrid Masters	A	A	1R	2R	2R	QF	A	A	A	0 / 4	3–4	43%
Hamburg	A	Q1	A	3R	SF	A	A	NMS		0 / 2	6–2	75%
Canada Masters	A	1R	A	3R	A	2R	1R	A	A	0 / 4	3–4	43%
Cincinnati Masters	A	Q1	A	3R	A	2R	A	A	A	0 / 2	3–2	60%
Paris Masters	A	A	1R	2R	QF	2R	2R	A	A	0 / 5	4–5	44%
Career statistics
Year	2002	2003	2004	2005	2006	2007	2008	2009	2010		W–L	Win %
Titles–finals	0–0	0–0	0–1	1–2	2–3	0–0	0–1	0–1	0–0		3–8	27%
Hard win–loss	2–6	9–13	6–10	25–15	25–12	12–10	18–7	13–6	2–2		111–80	58%
Clay win–loss	0–0	3–4	6–6	6–5	13–5	0–0	6–5	0–1	0–1		35–26	57%
Grass win–loss	1–1	2–3	10–3	9–2	9–1	0–0	8–3	0–0	0–0		40–13	75%
Carpet win–loss	0–0	1–1	5–5	4–5	7–1	1–1	0–0	0–0	0–0		21–14	60%
Overall win–loss	3–7	15–21	27–24	44–27	54–19	13–11	32–15	13–7	2–3		208–135	61%
Tournaments	7	18	22	24	20	10	16	7	3	Career Total: 127		
Year-end ranking	89	74	29	21	9	85	36	95	478	Prize Money: $4,024,686		

- NMS – from 2009, Hamburg Masters is not Masters Series event
- Davis Cup and World Team Cup matches are included in the statistics.
- 1 – before 2002, he had 4–1 (Carpet: 3–1, Grass: 1–0) score in Davis Cup matches.

=== Doubles ===
Tournament	2003	2004	2005	2006	2007	2008	2009	2010	SR	W–L	Win %
Grand Slam tournaments
Australian Open	A	2R	1R	A	A	A	A	A	0 / 2	1–2	33%
French Open	A	3R	A	A	A	A	A	A	0 / 1	2–1	67%
Wimbledon	1R	A	A	A	A	A	A	A	0 / 1	0–1	0%
US Open	QF	1R	2R	A	A	A	A	A	0 / 3	4–3	57%
Win–loss	3–2	3–3	1–2	0–0	0–0	0–0	0–0	0–0	0 / 7	7–7	50%
Olympic Games
Summer Olympics	NH	3rd	not held			A	not held		0 / 1	4–1	80%
ATP Tour Masters 1000
Indian Wells Masters	1R	A	1R	1R	A	A	A	1R	0 / 4	0–4	0%
Miami Open	A	A	A	QF	A	A	A	A	0 / 1	2–1	67%
Miami Open	A	A	QF	A	A	A	A	A	0 / 1	2–1	67%
Hamburg	A	A	SF	A	A	A	NMS		0 / 1	3–1	75%
Canada Masters	A	A	A	A	A	QF	A	A	0 / 1	2–1	67%
Cincinnati Masters	A	A	1R	A	A	A	A	A	0 / 1	0–1	0%
Win–loss	0–1	0–0	5–4	2–2	0–0	2–1	0–0	0–1	0 / 9	9–9	50%

== ATP Tour career earnings ==
Year	Majors	ATP wins	Total wins	Earnings (US$)	Money list rank
2002	0	0	0	101,122	165
2003	0	0	0	277,743	79
2004	0	0	0	579,375	38
2005	0	1	1	702,670	27
2006	0	2	2	1,276,265	9
2007	0	0	0	209,610	146
2008	0	0	0	600,326	44
2009	0	0	0	197,818	133
2010	0	0	0	52,464	284
Career	0	3	3	4,024,686	

== Top 10 wins ==
Season	1999	2000	2001	2002	2003	2004	2005	2006	2007	2008	2009	2010	Total
Wins	0	0	0	2	0	1	1	5	2	1	1	0	13

#	Player	Rank	Event	Surface	Rd	Score	Ančić Rank
2002
1.	(Switzerland) Roger Federer	6	Wimbledon, London, United Kingdom	Grass	1R	6–3, 7–6^{(7–2)}, 6–3	154
2.	(Russia) Yevgeny Kafelnikov	4	Indianapolis, United States	Hard	2R	4–6, 6–2, 6–4	129
2004
3.	(United Kingdom) Tim Henman	6	Wimbledon, London, United Kingdom	Grass	QF	7–6^{(7–5)}, 6–4, 6–2	63
2005
4.	(United Kingdom) Tim Henman	7	Rotterdam, Netherlands	Hard (i)	QF	7–6^{(7–5)}, 7–6^{(7–4)}	31
2006
5.	(Croatia) Ivan Ljubičić	5	Marseille, France	Hard (i)	QF	7–6^{(7–2)}, 3–6, 6–3	21
6.	(Russia) Nikolay Davydenko	5	Miami, United States	Hard	4R	7–5, 6–4	23
7.	(United States) James Blake	7	Hamburg, Germany	Clay	3R	4–6, 7–5, 7–6^{(7–3)}	13
8.	(Russia) Nikolay Davydenko	6	Hamburg, Germany	Clay	QF	5–7, 7–6^{(7–4)}, 6–3	13
9.	(Spain) Tommy Robredo	7	French Open, Paris, France	Clay	4R	6–4, 4–6, 2–6, 6–4, 7–5	12
2007
10.	(Germany) Tommy Haas	9	Cincinnati, United States	Hard	1R	3–6, 7–6^{(7–3)}, 6–3	38
11.	(United States) James Blake	8	Madrid, Spain	Hard (i)	2R	6–3, 6–4	49
2008
12.	(Spain) David Ferrer	5	Wimbledon, London, United Kingdom	Grass	3R	6–4, 6–4, 6–7^{(5–7)}, 7–6^{(7–3)}	43
2009
13.	(France) Gilles Simon	8	Rotterdam, Netherlands	Hard (i)	2R	6–4, 3–6, 6–3	28

== See also ==
- Croatia Davis Cup Team
- Goran Ivanišević
