= La Plage de Saint Tropez =

Single by Army of Lovers

from the album The Gods of Earth and Heaven
- B-side: "Heterosexuality"
- Released: 1993
- Studio: Europa Studios
- Genre: Dance; disco; Eurodance
- Length: 3:32
- Label: Polydor Records; Stockholm Records
- Songwriters: Alexander Bard; Anders Wollbeck; Jean-Pierre Barda; Michaela de la Cour; Dominika Peczynski
- Producers: Alexander Bard; Anders Wollbeck; Per Adebratt

Army of Lovers singles chronology
"Israelism" (1993)	"La Plage de Saint Tropez" (1993)	"I Am" (1993)

Music video
- "La Plage de Saint Tropez" on YouTube

"La Plage de Saint Tropez" is a song recorded by Swedish group Army of Lovers. It was released in 1993 as the second single from their third album, The Gods of Earth and Heaven (1993), and peaked at number two in Greece, number 15 in Finland and number 17 in Flanders. The song's music video was directed by Swedish director Fredrik Boklund, who also directed the other videos for the band.

== Critical reception ==
Swedish Göteborgsposten stated in their review of The Gods of Earth and Heaven that the song is "another hit", adding it as a "schlager-built song with a fast rhythm". A reviewer from Music & Media described it as "a souped-up version of 'fat' Elvis' 'My Boy'" that "will definitely find the sun on its side. Beaches will not be the same anymore, and the charts will go topless..."

== Track listing ==
- 7" single, Sweden (1993)
1. "La Plage de Saint Tropez" (Radio Edit) – 3:32
2. "Heterosexuality" (Album Version) – 4:10
- 12" maxi-single, Greece (1993)
1. "La Plage de Saint Tropez" (Radio Edit) – 3:32
2. "La Plage de Saint Tropez" (Cancanpourbonbondepapa Mix) – 6:53
3. "Heterosexuality" (Album Version) – 4:10
4. "Heterosexuality" (Garden of Sweden Mix) – 4:59
- CD single, France (1993)
1. "La Plage de Saint Tropez" (Radio Edit) – 3:32
2. "Heterosexuality" (Album Version) – 4:10
- CD maxi, Europe (1993)
1. "La Plage de Saint Tropez" (Radio Edit) – 3:32
2. "La Plage de Saint Tropez" (Cancanpourbonbondepapa Mix) – 6:53
3. "Heterosexuality" (Album Version) – 4:10
4. "Heterosexuality" (Garden of Sweden Mix) – 4:59

== Charts ==
Chart (1993)	Peak position
Belgium (Ultratop 50 Flanders)	17
Finland (Suomen virallinen lista)	15
Germany (GfK)	83
Greece (Pop + Rock)	2
