= Nuzak =

Nuzak may refer to:

- Anders Wollbeck, a Swedish musician
- Fluoxetine hydrochloride, an antidepressant
