= Master Series =

Compilation album series

Master Series is the title of a line of greatest hits albums, released in European countries primarily by PolyGram International, as well as A&M Records, Deram Records, FFRR Records, Mercury Records, and Polydor Records. In addition, some albums were reissued by Universal Music Group under the Universal Masters Collection and Millennium Edition titles.

== Series ==
Four Master Series series of albums were released: from 1987–1990, 1996–1998, 1998–1999, and from 2003 onwards.

The covers of each series are visually unified:

- 1987 series: Black background, "Master Serie" in a sans-serif typeface, the artist's name in a script typeface, a prominent red stripe, and a photo.
- 1996 series: Black background, the artist's name in a serif typeface, and a collage of photos.
- 1998 series: White background, "Master Series" in a script typeface, the artist's name in a sans-serif typeface, and a photo.
- 2003 series: A large photo crossfading into a black background with the artist's name in a serif typeface, and "Master Serie" set against a red glow.

The 1996 series represented various bands in eclectic genres (such as new wave) with relatively small followings, and the 1998 series included hard rock/progressive rock musicians and bands. These series are branded with the international title Master Series. The French title Master série is used to brand the more traditional line with a strong focus on European pop singers, which are frequently issued in multiple volumes. Each subsequent series also reissued some albums from the previous series.

== Releases ==
=== 1987 series ===
- Daniel Balavoine Volume 1(1986) – Master Serie
- Daniel Balavoine Volume 2(1992) – Master Serie
- Barbara Volume 1 – Master Serie
- Barbara Volume 2 – Master Serie
- Georges Brassens Volume 1 – Master Serie
- Georges Brassens Volume 2 – Master Serie
- Georges Brassens Volume 3 – Master Serie
- Mike Brant – Master Serie
- Jacques Brel Volume 1 – Master Serie
- Jacques Brel Volume 2 – Master Serie
- Alain Bashung – Master Serie
- Jane Birkin – Master Serie
- Frida Boccara – Master Serie
- Jacques Brel – Master Serie
- Jean-Michel Caradec (1989) – Master Serie
- Christophe – Master Serie
- Dalida Volume 1 – Master Serie
- Dalida Volume 2 – Master Serie
- Michel Delpech – Master Serie
- Jacques Dutronc – Master Serie
- François Feldman (1994) – Master Serie
- Jean Ferrat Volume 1 (1988) – Master Serie
- Jean Ferrat Volume 2 (1990) – Master Serie
- Nino Ferrer – Master Serie
- Claude François Volume 1 – Master Serie
- Claude François Volume 2 – Master Serie
- Serge Gainsbourg – Master Serie
- Daniel Guichard – Master Serie
- Johnny Hallyday Volume 1 – Master Serie
- Johnny Hallyday Volume 2 (1990) – Master Serie
- Jean-Luc Lahaye – Master Serie
- Bernard Lavilliers – Master Serie
- Maxime Le Forestier (1987) – Master Serie
- Guy Marchand – Master Serie
- Melina Mercouri – Master Serie
- Yves Montand – Master Serie
- Nana Mouskouri Volume 1 – Master Serie
- Nana Mouskouri Volume 2 – Master Serie
- Georges Moustaki – Master Serie
- Claude Nougaro Volume 1 – Master Serie
- Claude Nougaro Volume 2 – Master Serie
- Claude Nougaro Volume 3 – Master Serie
- Edith Piaf – Master Serie
- Serge Reggiani – Master Serie
- Renaud – Master Serie
- Nicole Rieu – Master Serie
- Demis Roussos – Master Serie
- William Sheller – Master Serie
- Mort Shuman Volume 1 – Master Serie
- Mort Shuman Volume 2 (1991) – Master Serie
- Yves Simon (1988) – Master Serie
- Alan Stivell (1990) – Master Serie
- Tri Yann(1986) – Master Serie
- Boris Vian – Master Serie

=== 1996 series ===
- 10cc – Master Series
- 1996 ABBA – Master Series
- 1997 ABC – Master Series
- Wolfgang Ambros – Master Series
- 1997 Joan Armatrading – Master Series
- 1996 The Allman Brothers Band – Master Series
- 1997 Army of Lovers – Master Series
- 1997 Big Country – Master Series
- 1997 Burt Bacharach – Master Series
- 1996 Bananarama – Master Series
- 1997 Berlin – Master Series
- 1998 Maria Bill – Master Series
- 1996 Black – Master Series
- Elkie Brooks – Master Series
- 1996 Sam Brown – Master Series
- 1996 Jimmy Somerville – Master Series (reissue)
- 1997 Camel – Master Series
- 1998 Peter Cornelius – Master Series
- 1996 Dexys Midnight Runners – Master Series
- Yvonne Elliman – Master Series
- 1998 Rainhard Fendrich – Master Series
- Bill Haley – Master Series
- 1998 Ludwig Hirsch – Master Series
- 1997 Joe Jackson – Master Series
- 1997 The Jam – Master Series
- 1996 Tom Jones – Master Series
- 1996 Level 42 – Master Series
- 1997 Liza Minnelli – Master Series
- 1998 The Moody Blues – Master Series
- Nana Mouskouri – Master Series (reissue)
- 1996 The Neville Brothers – Master Series
- Iggy Pop – Master Series
- Demis Roussos – Master Series (reissue)
- The Rubettes – Master Series
- Scorpions – Master Series
- The Small Faces – Master Series
- Jimmy Somerville – Master Series
- 1998 Squeeze – Master Series
- STS – Master Series
- Donna Summer – Master Series
- 1998 Visage – Master Series
- 1998 Waterloo & Robinson – Master Series
- Bruce Willis – Master Series
- 1998 Georg Danzer - Master Series
- 1998 Kurt Ostbahn - Master Series
- 1998 Stefanie Werger - Master Series
- 1998 Arik Brauer - Master Series

=== 1998 series ===
- 1998 ABBA – Master Series (reissue)
- Graeme Allwright – Master Series
- Ange – Master Serie
- Daniel Balavoine – Master Serie (reissue)
- Bananarama – Master Series (reissue)
- Visage – Master Series
- Barbara – Master Serie (reissue)
- 1999 Barclay James Harvest – Master Series
- Brigitte Bardot – Master Serie
- The Barron Knights – Master Series
- Acker Bilk – Master Series
- Jane Birkin – Master Serie (reissue)
- Georges Brassens – Master Serie
- Jacques Brel – Master Serie (reissue)
- Roy Buchanan – Master Series
- 1999 Kim Carnes – Master Series
- Mirek Černý – Master Serie
- 1998 Dio – Master Series
- Jean Ferrat – Master Serie (reissue)
- Serge Gainsbourg – Master Serie (reissue)
- France Gall – Master Serie
- Godley & Creme – Master Series
- Johnny Hallyday – Master Serie (reissue)
- Engelbert Humperdinck – Master Series
- 1999 Joe Jackson – Master Series (reissue)
- 1998 Tom Jones – Master Series (reissue)
- Kool & the Gang – Master Serie
- Jean-Luc Lahaye – Master Serie (reissue)
- Bernard Lavilliers – Master Serie
- Luna Twist – Master Serie
- Enrico Macias – Master Serie
- The Mamas & the Papas – Master Series
- Guy Marchand – Master Serie (reissue)
- Melina Mercouri – Master Serie (reissue)
- 1998 John Miles – Master Series
- Eddy Mitchell – Master Serie
- Jeanne Moreau – Master Serie
- Nana Mouskouri – Master Series (reissue)
- Georges Moustaki – Master Serie
- Nicoletta – Master Serie
- Robert Palmer – Master Series
- Edith Piaf – Master Serie (reissue)
- Pink Fairies – Master Series
- The Platters – Master Series
- Cozy Powell – Master Series
- Renaud – Master Serie
- Serge Reggiani – Master Serie (reissue)
- Nicole Rieu – Master Serie (reissue)
- The Righteous Brothers – Master Series
- Demis Roussos – Master Serie (reissue)
- The Sensational Alex Harvey Band – Master Series
- The Shadows – Master Series
- Mort Shuman – Master Serie
- 1998 Status Quo – Master Series
- Alan Stivell – Master Serie (reissue)
- 1998 The Style Council – Master Series
- Taxmeni – Master Series
- 1998 Thin Lizzy – Master Series
- Hervé Vilard – Master Serie
- 1998 Rick Wakeman – Master Series
- Roger Whittaker – Master Series

=== Millennium Edition reissues ===
- Wolfgang Ambros – Millennium Edition
- 2000 Joan Armatrading – Millennium Edition
- Burt Bacharach – Millennium Edition
- Black – Millennium Edition
- Elkie Brooks - Millennium Edition
- Ludwig Hirsch – Millennium Edition
- John Miles – Millennium Collection

=== 2003 series ===
- 2003 ABBA – Master Serie (reissue)
- Daniel Balavoine – Master Serie (reissue)
- Barbara – Master Serie (reissue)
- Brigitte Bardot – Master Serie (reissue)
- Gilbert Bécaud – Master Serie
- Jane Birkin – Master Serie (reissue)
- Georges Brassens – Master Serie (reissue)
- Jacques Brel – Master Serie (reissue)
- Jan de Wilde – Master Serie
- Jean Ferrat – Master Serie (reissue)
- Serge Gainsbourg – Master Serie (reissue)
- Kool & the Gang – Master Serie (reissue)
- Bernard Lavilliers – Master Serie (reissue)
- Enrico Macias – Master Serie (reissue)
- Eddy Mitchell – Master Serie (reissue)
- Jeanne Moreau – Master Serie (reissue)
- Nana Mouskouri – Master Serie (reissue)
- Georges Moustaki – Master Serie (reissue)
- Nicoletta – Master Serie (reissue)
- Florent Pagny – Master Serie
- Edith Piaf – Master Serie (reissue)
- Serge Reggiani – Master Serie (reissue)
- Renaud – Master Serie (reissue)
- André Rieu – Master Serie
- Tino Rossi – Master Serie
- Demis Roussos – Master Serie (reissue)
- Michel Sardou – Master Serie
- Alan Stivell – Master Serie (reissue)
- Herve Vilard – Master Serie (reissue)
