= Masenko =

Masenko may refer to:

- Masenqo, an Eritrean and Ethiopian musical instrument
- Masenko, a fictional technique used by Piccolo, Gohan, Trunks, and Pan in the Dragon Ball franchise
- "Masenko", a 1991 song by Midi, Maxi & Efti
