= Crucified (Army of Lovers song) =

1991 single by Army of Lovers

Single by Army of Lovers

from the album Massive Luxury Overdose
- B-side: "Love Revolution"
- Released: May 1991
- Studio: Sonet (Stockholm, Sweden)
- Genre: Eurodisco; dance-pop
- Length: 3:32
- Label: Ton Son Ton
- Songwriters: Alexander Bard; Anders Wollbeck; Jean-Pierre Barda
- Producers: Alexander Bard; Anders Wollbeck

Army of Lovers singles chronology
"Supernatural" (1990)	"Crucified" (1991)	"Obsession" (1991)
Signed on my Tattoo (2013)	Crucified 2013 (2013)	People are Lonely (2014)

Music video
- "Crucified" on YouTube

Alternative Cover
- 1992 U.K cover

Alternative cover
- 1992 U.S cover

Alternative cover
- 2013 cover

"Crucified" is a song by Swedish band Army of Lovers, released as the first single from their second album, Massive Luxury Overdose (1991). It was released in Sweden in May 1991 by label Ton Son Ton. The song was written by bandmembers Alexander Bard and Jean-Pierre Barda with Anders Wollbeck, and features Barda (vocals, drums), Bard (vocals, computer), and La Camilla (vocals, bass).

It was successful in several European countries, including Belgium, where it reached the number one spot, as well as Germany, Sweden, Spain, Austria and Switzerland, where it reached the top 10. In the United States, "Crucified" peaked at number six on the Billboard Dance Club Play chart and spent a total of 14 weeks in the top 20. The accompanying music video was directed by Fredrik Boklund and Martin Persson and filmed in an old castle in Sweden. The initial remixes available on the CD maxi and vinyl 12-inch maxi are by Nuzak. The track samples the drum break from James Brown's Funky Drummer.

In 2013, Army of Lovers made a new version of the song titled "Crucified 2013". It contains new vocals from Camilla Henemark, and then a second version with new vocals from Dominika Peczynski was issued. Kurt Cobain of the alternative rock group Nirvana praised the band in his posthumously published journals, specifically the song "Crucified."

== Critical reception ==
AllMusic editor Ned Raggett described the song as a "totally over-the-top disco anthem on all fronts that takes ABBA's winning combination of memorable hooks and harmonies as inspiration and slathers a load of glitter and make-up over the whole thing." He noted further that "having ultracampy lyrical asides like 'I cry, I pray, mon dieu' doesn't hurt the sheer giddiness at work, and neither do the 'I'm crucified like my saviour' chorus, church organ and twangy Duane Eddy guitar." David A. Keeps from Austin American Statesman felt songs like "Crucified" "are steeped in romantic and biblical imagery that suggests, in a typically broad camp stroke, that obsessive love is the most religious experience of all." Larry Flick from Billboard magazine named it a "super-hot slammin' houser". Bevan Hannah from The Canberra Times wrote, "Judging by the video for their first single release 'Crucified', their image was carefully plotted, combining cabaret style costumes and graphics with groovy European dance rhythms." Ian Gittins from Melody Maker named it Single of the Week and "a wicked, s-s-s-sizzling dance cut with an immaculate sense of deadpan camp and a pounding beat punctuated by choruses which build up like the sun rising. Then the whole caboodle is topped with the most nerve-rackingly exact Scandinavian harmonies since Abba." Music Week viewed the song as "a bizarre pop/dance confection, both commercial and camp."

Newcastle Evening Chronicle called it a "clever almost choral rock approach on a lively danceable number", noting its "ebullient bounce". People Magazine wrote that "disco goes to church in this hip-hop hallelujah". James Hamilton from the Record Mirror Dance Update commented, "Camp and corny party fun from Sweden, this Abba-ishly chorused, phonetic guy rapped, strings swirled and—just to cap it all!—Duane Eddy-ish guitar twanged 0-122bpm jiggly jumper sounds like a pop hit with wide gimmick appeal". Sophie Lawrence reviewed the song for Smash Hits, writing, "It's one of those records where you can imagine everyone at a disco dancing around with their hands in the air, isn't it? I like it. It's got a gospel feel and really good harmonies on it." Edna Gundersen from USA Today said, "Watch for Army of Lovers to succeed Right Said Fred as the newest camp sensation to hop the pond. The Stockholm trio's loopy, trashy Eurodisco single, 'Crucified', is the best but by no means the only infectious groove on their Massive Luxury Overdose album." Joe Brown from The Washington Post found that "the Army reveals a lyrical obsession with a millenarian-apocalyptic- sacrilege thang, and La Camilla's kitschy cooing includes imitations of Grace Jones and Debbie Harry."

== Chart performance ==
In Europe, "Crucified" peaked at number one in Belgium for three weeks and number two in Greece and the Netherlands. Between 1991 and 1992, the song peaked at number three in Austria, number five in Germany, number six in Switzerland, and number eight in Spain and Sweden. In the United Kingdom, the single peaked at number 31 on the UK Singles Chart on 23 February 1992, after having reached number 47 the year before. On the Eurochart Hot 100, "Crucified" peaked at number 14 in March 1992. Outside Europe, the song peaked at number six on both the US Billboard Dance Club Play and Maxi-Singles Sales charts. In West Asia, it became a top-20 hit in Israel, peaking at number 12 in its second week on the chart, on 24 September 1991. In 2014, the single again charted in the US, reaching number 18 on the Billboard Dance Club Songs chart and number 45 on the Billboard Dance/Electronic Songs chart.

== Music video ==
A music video was produced to promote the single. It was directed by Swedish directors Fredrik Boklund and Martin Persson, and filmed at Börringe Priory, a castle in Svedala, Sweden, that was built in 1763 on the ruins of a medieval Benedictine priory. In one scene, the band is seen parading past a portrait of Carl XVI Gustaf, the King of Sweden. The video was one of the most played on MTV Europe in the fall of 1991.

== Track listings ==
- 7-inch single
1. "Crucified" (Radio Edit) - 3:32
2. "Love Revolution" - 4:02
- 12-inch maxi-single (1991)
1. "Crucified" (The Nuzak Remix) - 8:03
2. "Crucified" (Yherushalaim Dub) - 7:42
3. "Crucified" (Radio Edit) - 3:32
- CD single (1991)
1. "Crucified" (Radio Edit) - 3:32
2. "Crucified" (The Nuzak Remix) - 8:03
3. "Crucified" (Yherushalaim Dub) - 7:42
- 12-inch maxi-single (UK, 1992)
1. "Crucified" (The Nuzak Mix) - 8:03
2. "Crucified" (Crucifixion Hardcore '92 Mix) - 5:06
3. "Crucified" (The Maffia Mix) - 5:53
- 12-inch maxi-single (US, 1992)
1. "Crucified" (Judas Mix) - 6:47
2. "Crucified" (Judas Mix Instrumental) - 6:38
3. "Crucified" (Judas Mix Dubstrumental) - 4:19
4. "Crucified" (Teknostalgia Mix) - 4:14
5. "Ride the Bullet" (The DNA Remix) - 4:54
6. "Ride the Bullet" (The DNA Remix Dub) - 5:42
7. "Crucified" (Yherushalaim Dub) - 7:40
8. "Crucified" (Crucifixion Mix) - 5:09
- CD single (UK, 1992)
1. "Crucified" (Radio Edit) - 3:32
2. "Crucified" (Crucifixion Hardcore '92 Mix) - 5:06
3. "Crucified" (The Maffia Mix) - 5:53
4. "Crucified" (The Nuzak Mix) 8:03
- CD maxi (US, 1992)
1. "Crucified" (Single Version) - 3:31
2. "Crucified" (Nuzak Remix) - 8:00
3. "Crucified" (Judas Mix) - 6:47
4. "Crucified" (Judas Mix Dubstramental) - 4:19
5. "Crucified" (Teknostradamus Mix) - 6:36
6. "Crucified" (Teknostalgia Mix) - 4:14
7. "Crucified" (Crucifixion Mix) 5:09
8. "Ride the Bullet" (The DNA Remix) - 4:54
9. "Ride the Bullet" (Molotov Cocktail Mix) - 4:58
10. "Ride the Bullet" (Tren De Amor Mix) - 6:24
- Digital-download (2013)
1. "Crucified 2013" (Radio Edit) - 3:15
2. "Crucified 2013" (Sound Factory Radio) - 3:29
3. "Crucified 2013" (Per QX + Sonny Switch Radio) - 3:00
4. "Crucified 2013" (NORD Radio Edit) - 3:31
5. "Crucified 2013" (Extended Version) - 5:54
6. "Crucified 2013" (Sound Factory Paradise Anthem) - 8:32
7. "Crucified 2013" (Per QX + Sonny Switch Club Mix) - 5:49
8. "Crucified 2013" (NORD Club Mix) - 5:54
9. "Crucified 2013" (Sound Factory Dark Dub) - 8:25

== Credits and personnel ==
- Produced by: Alexander Bard and Anders Wollbeck
- Co-produced and engineered by: Per Adebratt
- Recorded and mixed at: Sonct Studios, Stockholm
- Lead vocals by: Jean-Pierre Barda and Dominika Peczynski (2013)
- Backing vocals by: Katarina Wilczewski, Erika Essen-Möller, Malin Bäckström, Jean-Paul Wall and Rickard Evenlind
- Keyboards and programming by: Anders Wollbeck. Katarina Wilczewski appears courtesy of Caprice Records. Jean-Paul Wall and Richard Evenlind appear courtesy of Sonet Grammofon. Anders Wollbeck appears courtesy of Sunrise Records.
- Executive producer: Ola Håkansson
- Sleeve design by: Marie S-Wollback
- Photography by: Carl-Johan Paulin
- Stylist: Camilla Thulin
- Hair and make-up by: Jean-Pierre Barda
- Promotion supervisor: Jonas Holst
- Video clip directed by: Fredrik Boklund, and Martin Persson
- Management: La La La Entreprises

== Charts ==
=== Weekly charts ===
Chart (1991)	Peak position
Australia (ARIA)	56
Austria (Ö3 Austria Top 40)	3
Belgium (Ultratop 50 Flanders)	1
Belgium (Ultratop 50 Wallonia)	4
Europe (Eurochart Hot 100)	14
Europe (European Hit Radio)	33
France (SNEP)	22
Germany (Media Control)	5
Greece (IFPI)	2
Israel (Israeli Singles Chart)	12
Netherlands (Dutch Top 40)	2
Netherlands (Single Top 100)	3
Quebec (ADISQ)	36
Spain (AFYVE)	8
Sweden (Topplistan)	8
Switzerland (Schweizer Hitparade)	6
UK Singles (OCC)	47
UK Club Chart (Record Mirror)	96

Chart (1992)	Peak position
UK Singles (OCC)	31
UK Airplay (Music Week)	45
UK Dance (Music Week)	42
UK Club Chart (Music Week)	42
US Dance Club Play (Billboard)	6
US Maxi-Singles Sales (Billboard)	6

Chart (2014)	Peak position
US Dance Club Songs (Billboard)	18
US Dance/Electronic Songs (Billboard)	45

=== Year-end charts ===
Chart (1991)	Position
Belgium (Ultratop 50 Flanders)	22
Netherlands (Dutch Top 40)	25
Netherlands (Single Top 100)	25
Sweden (Topplistan)	46

Chart (1992)	Position
Austria (Ö3 Austria Top 40)	25
Europe (Eurochart Hot 100)	83
Germany (Media Control)	31

== Usage in media and cover versions ==
The music video of "Crucified" was used in an episode of American animated television series Beavis and Butt-Head.

The song was played in Gabriel Aghion's 1996 film, Pédale douce, and was thus included in the track listing of the soundtrack. It was also played in the film Marock (2005), and was in the video game Just Dance 4 on the Wii.

Alexander Bard's music project, Gravitonas, used a sample of the song on the track "Sacrifice" from their 2012 EP Black Ceremony.

Ghost covered the song as part of their 2013 EP, If You Have Ghost.

In 2021, Azerbaijani singer Efendi sampled the first few seconds of "Crucified" for her track "Mata Hari", which would represent Azerbaijan in Eurovision 2021.

In 2022, after the release of STONE OCEAN, the 6th part of JoJo's Bizarre Adventure, the song started being frequently used in videos of one of the characters, Enrico Pucci using his Stand, Made in Heaven.
