= Israelism (song) =

Single by Army of Lovers

from the album The Gods of Earth and Heaven
- B-side: "Israelism" (Dub Version)
- Released: March 1993
- Genre: Dance; disco; Eurodance
- Length: 3:20
- Label: Polydor Records; Stockholm Records
- Songwriters: Alexander Bard; Anders Wollbeck; Jean-Pierre Barda; Michaela de la Cour; Dominika Peczynski
- Producers: Alexander Bard; Anders Wollbeck; Per Adebratt

Army of Lovers singles chronology
"Judgment Day" (1992)	"Israelism" (1993)	"La Plage de Saint Tropez" (1993)

Music video
- "Israelism" on YouTube

"Israelism" is a song recorded by Swedish group Army of Lovers, released in March 1993 by Polydor Records and Stockholm Records as the first single from the group's third album, The Gods of Earth and Heaven (1993). The song was a European hit, reaching the top 10 in countries like Belgium, Finland, Israel and Sweden. It combines the Jewish folk song "Hevenu shalom aleichem" with Eurodance-beats and also includes additional lyrics written by Alexander Bard, Anders Wollbeck, Jean-Pierre Barda, Michaela de la Cour and Dominika Peczynski. Bard and Wollbeck produced it with Per Adebratt. The accompanying music video for the song was directed by Swedish director Fredrik Boklund, who had previously directed the other music videos for Army of Lovers.

== Critical reception ==
Swedish Göteborgsposten viewed the song as a "controversial tribute to Jewish culture", concluding that it is "yet another hit." Pan-European magazine Music & Media remarked that it incorporates elements from five traditional Jewish folk hymns "in an updated arrangement." They added that "Israelism" is "intended as an anthem for young people around the world, proving there is much pride and joy to be found in Jewish lifestyle. The song should be seen as a powerful statement against racism and bigotry in Europe today."

Stephen Dalton from NME declared it as "a towering celebration of Jewish culture [...] which stomps like Fiddler on the Roof at a packed gay disco." He also noted that this is the Army's "anti-fascist anthem" and comes with a sleeve guarantee that the album is "strictly kosher for passover." Tony Cross from Smash Hits gave "Israelism" three out of five, calling it a "goose-stepping number". He added that "they've gone back to the formula of amateur dramatics, big chants, quirky keyboards and barmy blokes."

== Chart performance ==
"Israelism" was a hit in several European countries and remains one of the band's most successful hits. In their native Sweden, the song charted for 4 weeks, peaking at number ten, while reaching number 11 on the Swedish Dance chart and number three on the Swedish Airplay chart. It was also a top-10 hit in Belgium and Finland, peaking at number nine and five, and a top-20 hit in Denmark and Norway (12 and 13). In Germany and Switzerland, it was a top-40 hit (32 and 31). On the Eurochart Hot 100, the single peaked at number 48 in May 1993. It didn't make the UK top 75 Singles Chart or chart in the US. Outside Europe, "Israelism" was a top-10 hit in Israel, peaking at number two.

== Single track listing ==
- 7" single
1. "Israelism" (Radio Edit) — 3:20
2. "Israelism" (Dub Version) — 3:13
- 12" maxi-single
1. "Israelism" (Radio Edit) — 3:20
2. "Israelism" (Goldcalfhorahhorror Mix) — 6:54
3. "Israelism" (Kibbutznikblitzkrieg Mix) — 6:32
4. "Israelism" (Très Camp David Mix) — 3:13
- CD single
1. "Israelism" (Radio Edit) — 3:20
2. "Israelism" (Dub Version) — 3:13

== Charts ==
=== Weekly charts ===
Chart (1993)	Peak position
Belgium (Ultratop 50 Flanders)	9
Denmark (IFPI Denmark)	15
Denmark (Music & Media)	12
Europe (Eurochart Hot 100)	48
Finland (IFPI)	5
Germany (GfK)	32
Israel (Israeli Singles Chart)	2
Israel (Israel Airplay Chart)	3
Norway (VG-lista)	13
Sweden (Sverigetopplistan)	10
Sweden (Sweden Dance Chart)	11
Sweden (Sweden Airplay Chart)	3
Switzerland (Schweizer Hitparade)	31

=== Year-end charts ===
Chart (1993)	Position
Belgium (Ultratop)	82
Sweden (Topplistan)	90
