= Obsession (Army of Lovers song) =

Single by Army of Lovers

from the album Massive Luxury Overdose
- B-side: "Obsession" (dub version)
- Released: 9 August 1991
- Recorded: Sonet (Stockholm, Sweden)
- Genre: Downtempo; synth-pop
- Length: 3:40
- Label: Ton Son Ton
- Songwriters: Alexander Bard; Anders Wollbeck
- Producers: Alexander Bard; Anders Wollbeck

Army of Lovers singles chronology
"Crucified" (1991)	"Obsession" (1991)	"Candyman Messiah" (1991)

Music video
- "Obsession" (1991) on YouTube

Music video
- "Obsession" (1992) on YouTube

Obsession is a song by Swedish band Army of Lovers. The lyrics were written by Alexander Bard and Anders Wollbeck, and the song is in part inspired by Laurie Anderson's 1981 song "O Superman"—primarily, the "ah ah" looped backing track. Released in August 1991 by Ton Son Ton as the second single from their second album, Massive Luxury Overdose (1991), "Obsession" reached number one on both the radio and the dance charts in Sweden. It also peaked at number two on the Swedish Singles Chart, number four in Belgium, number seven in Austria and Germany, and number nine in Spain. In 1992, Army of Lovers re-released the single exclusively for the United States and includes remixes only found in this version; it reached number 11 on the Billboard Dance Club Play chart.

== Critical reception ==
Andy Kastanas from The Charlotte Observer complimented "Obsession" as "another good song that deserves a listen". He added, "This is much more downbeat than their earlier stuff, with easier vocals and a sound reminiscent of old Imagination or Enigma." Pan-European magazine Music & Media called it "slow disco". Ian Gittins from Melody Maker commented, "I was sufficiently moved by the Abba-harmonies and high camp of Army of Lovers' 'Crucified' to make it Single Of The Week, but this time the Swedish cartoon trio are far less instant." A reviewer from Newcastle Evening Chronicle declared it as "mesmerising".

== Chart performance ==
"Obsession" reached number two in the band's native Sweden and stayed within the top 10 for six weeks. Additionally, it reached number one on both the Swedish radio chart and the Swedish dance chart. It entered the top 10 in Austria, Belgium, Finland, Germany, Greece, Israel, the Netherlands, Spain, Sweden and Switzerland. In the United Kingdom, "Obsession" peaked at number 67 during its first week on the UK Singles Chart, on December 22, 1991. On the Eurochart Hot 100, it peaked at number 29 in February 1992. That year, it charted also in the United States, peaking at number 11 on the Billboard Dance Club Play chart.

== Music video ==
The band released two versions of the music video for "Obsession". It features the band performing in what appears to be a mental institution. The first version, from 1991, features La Camilla. But after she left the group, she was replaced by De La Cour, who appears in the second version from 1992. Both videos were directed by Swedish director Fredrik Boklund.

== Track listings ==
- 7-inch single UK (1991)
1. "Obsession" (Radio Edit) – 3:22
2. "Obsession" (Dub Version) – 3:43
- 12-inch maxi (1991)
1. "Obsession" (Schizoperetta Mix) – 6:40
2. "Obsession" (Radio Edit) – 3:22
3. "Obsession" (Armageddon Mix) – 4:09
4. "Obsession" (Hermaphrodisiac Mix) – 4:49
- CD single, Australia (1991)
1. "Obsession" (Radio Edit) – 3:22
2. "Obsession" (Schizoperetta Mix) – 6:40
3. "Obsession" (Dub Version) – 3:43
- 12-inch maxi, US (1992)
1. "Obsession" (Compulsion Mix) – 8:37
2. "Obsession" (Schizoperetta Mix) – 6:41
3. "Obsession" (A Cappella Mix) – 2:44
4. "Obsession" (Shadowzone Dub) – 8:30
5. "Obsession" (Techno-Schizo Mix) – 6:55
- CD maxi, US (1992)
1. "Obsession" (Radio Edit) – 3:40
2. "Obsession" (Compulsive Radio Edit) – 3:59
3. "Obsession" (Compulsion Mix) – 8:37
4. "Obsession" (Schizoperetta Mix) – 6:41
5. "Obsession" (Shadowzone Dub) – 8:30
6. "Obsession" (Techno-Schizo Mix) – 6:55

== Charts ==
=== Weekly charts ===
Chart (1991–1992)	Peak position
Australia (ARIA)	108
Austria (Ö3 Austria Top 40)	7
Belgium (Ultratop 50 Flanders)	4
Europe (Eurochart Hot 100)	29
Finland (Suomen virallinen lista)	9
Germany (GfK)	7
Greece (Virgin)	9
Israel (Israeli Singles Chart)	9
Netherlands (Dutch Top 40)	9
Netherlands (Single Top 100)	8
Spain (AFYVE)	9
Sweden (Sverigetopplistan)	2
Switzerland (Schweizer Hitparade)	7
UK Singles (OCC)	67
UK Airplay (Music Week)	44
US Dance Club Play (Billboard)	11
US Maxi-Singles Sales (Billboard)	11

=== Year-end charts ===
Chart (1991)	Position
Sweden (Topplistan)	19

Chart (1992)	Position
Belgium (Ultratop)	91
Germany (Media Control)	36
