= Camilla Thulin =

Swedish fashion designer (born 1961)

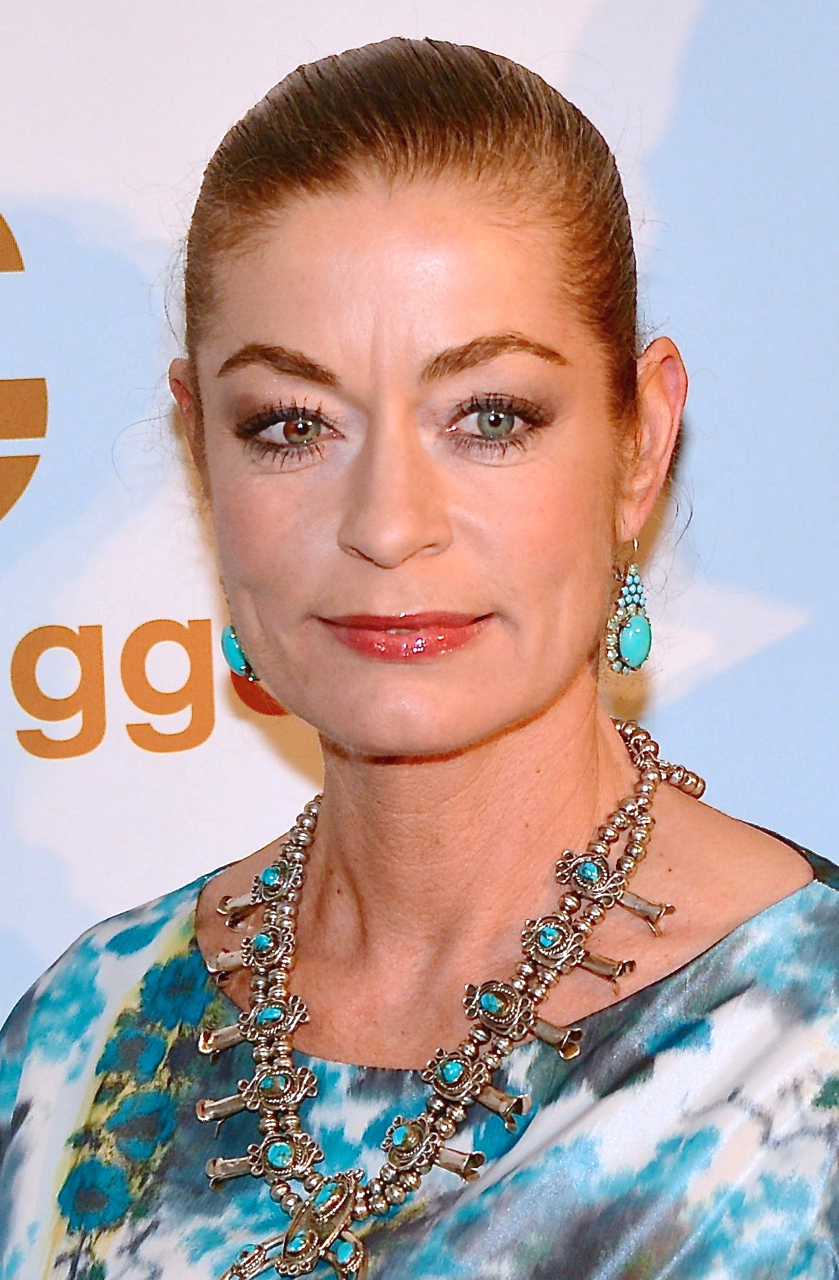
- Born: April 4, 1961 (age 65)
- Occupation: Fashion designer

Camilla Thulin (born April 4, 1961) is a Swedish fashion designer. She is particularly known for having designed all of Army of Lovers' outfits, and for having given Swedish politician Lars Leijonborg his new "man of the people" image in the lead-up to the 2002 Swedish elections. She appeared in the first Army of Lovers' music video to their first single When The Night Is Cold (1988) posing on a piano.

Thulin designed Malena Ernman's gown worn during her Eurovision Song Contest 2009 performance, reported to have cost 400,000 kronor (€37,471).

Thulin has also dressed Crown Princess Victoria and other members of the Swedish royal family.

After they had been a couple since 1993, Thulin married actor Johan Rabaeus in 2024.
