= Gravitonas =

Swedish electronic rock band

- Origin: Stockholm
- Genres: Electronica, Swedish pop music
- Years active: 2009–present
- Labels: SoFo Records, Universal Music

Gravitonas is a Swedish electronic rock band formed in 2009 and signed to Sofo Records (Sweden) and Universal Music (worldwide) in 2010. The band is fronted by vocalist Andreas Öhrn and formerly by record producer and songwriter Alexander Bard (of Army Of Lovers and BWO fame). Other collaborators in the project include keyboardist and producer Henrik Wikström and guitar player Ben Smith. Gravitonas are among the front figures of the Scandinavian electronica scene, often linked to artists like Robyn, The Knife, Lykke Li, Röyksopp, The Sound of Arrows, and Miike Snow, with whom they have also performed on several occasions.

== History ==
Gravitonas' debut single Kites was released in April 2010 and spent four consecutive months in the Top 10 of the Swedish Dance Chart. The release featured remixes by a number of Scandinavia's leading electronic acts such as Dada Life and SoundFactory. A second release, The Hypnosis EP, was released digitally and internationally by Universal Music on 18 August 2010, featuring the band's second single Religious as its lead track.

Religious entered the Russian Hot 100 chart in November 2010 staying in the charts for over four months and receiving over 100,000 plays on Russian national radio, after which the track was successfully exported to the U.S. where it peaked at #28 in the Billboard Magazine Club Play Chart in April, 2011. A third release, The Coliseum EP, was released digitally on 3 November 2010, featuring lead single and video You Break Me Up.

Lead vocalist Andreas Öhrn and guitar player Ben Smith have since the launch of Gravitonas also taken up successful careers as songwriters and producers for other artists, including #1 hit singles in Japan for boy bands Hey! Say! JUMP and Kis-My-Ft2. Öhrn & Smith also wrote and produced the soundtrack for I Miss You, a movie by Swedish director Anders Grönros which was released in September 2011 and peaked at #2 in the Swedish Box Office Chart.

A collaboration track with Russian pop star Roma Kenga called Everybody Dance was released on 25 May 2011. This exclusive Swedish-Russian co-production was created through the joined forces of Universal Music Russia, Swedish record label Sofo Records, and Perpetuum Music. Everybody Dance entered the Russian Airplay Top 30 in July 2011 and was playlisted on the A-List of Eastern Europe's biggest radio network Europa Plus. The single has since charted in a further six European countries. Everybody Dance entered the Billboard Club Chart Top 50 in the U.S. on 21 November 2011 and eventually peaked at #19 becoming Gravitonas' first U.S. Top 20 hit.

A single and video called Lucky Star was released globally as a digital EP on 15 September 2011. The track was premiered live on Crimea Music Festival, the biggest music festival in Eastern Europe, broadcast from Yalta, Crimea on 8 September 2011 after which the track became a Top 20 hit single in five European countries, going all the way to #1 in Belarus. A single and video called Call Your Name was released on 14 March 2012 followed by a six-track EP called Black Ceremony on 21 March.

According to a message in 2015 sent by Alexander Bard himself on the Gravitonas Facebook fan page, he left the group and the music industry shortly after 2013 to focus on his philosophy career.

In 2015, Andreas Öhrn posted a message indicating that the group had formed its own record company. The first single released was "My Chemical Breakdown" featuring Japanese rapper Gashima.

In 2019, Japanese pop group EXILE released "Love of History", for which Öhrn was credited as one of the track's composers along with Christian Fast, Henrik Nordenback, and EXILE vocalist/lyricist Atsushi Satō.

== Singles ==
Title	Year	Peak Position
Title	Year	^{USA Dance}
Kites	2010	—
Religious	2010	28
You Break Me Up	2010	—
Everybody Dance (featuring Roma Kenga)	2011	18
Lucky Star	2011	—
Call Your Name	2012	24
Sacrifice	2012	—
The Pain We Love To Hide	2012	—
Incredible	2012	20
Brighter (in cooperation with Guena LG)	2013	—
Signed on my Tattoo (Army of Lovers feat. Gravitonas)	2013	—
People Are Lonely (feat. Army of Lovers)	2014	49
My Chemical Breakdown (feat. Gashima)	2015	—
For The First Time	2016	—
"—" denotes items that did not chart or were not released in that territory.
