= King Midas (Army of Lovers song) =

1996 single by Army of Lovers

Single by Army of Lovers
- B-side: "Sexual Revolution"
- Released: 1996
- Studio: Cheiron (Stockholm)
- Genre: Disco; europop
- Length: 3:57
- Label: Stockholm
- Songwriter(s): Jonas Berggren
- Producer(s): Amadin

Army of Lovers singles chronology
"Venus and Mars / Megamix" (1995)	"King Midas" (1996)	"Let the Sunshine In" (2001)

Music video
- "King Midas" on YouTube

"King Midas" is a 1996 song recorded by Swedish band Army of Lovers. Written by Jonas Berggren from Ace of Base, it was produced by Amadin and included on the group's greatest hits album, Les Greatest Hits (1996). It charted for 6 weeks on the singles chart in Sweden, peaking at number 31 and was also a Top-20 sales hit in Hungary, peaking at number 19 in June 1996.

== Music video ==
The music video of "King Midas" was directed by Swedish director Fredrik Boklund. It was shot in black-and-white and features Army of Lovers performing the song in a night club. Boklund also directed the other music videos for Army of Lovers.

== Track listing and formats ==
- European CD maxi-single
1. "King Midas" (Radio Edit) – 3:57
2. "Sexual Revolution" (Latin Radio Edit) – 3:58
3. "King Midas" (Manhattan Massacre Mix) – 6:04
4. "King Midas" (Bass Nation's 4 Seasons Mix) – 6:10
- Swedish 12-inch maxi-single

A1. "King Midas" (Manhattan Massacre Mix) – 6:04
A2. "King Midas" (Bass Nation's 4 Seasons Mix) – 6:10
A3. "King Midas" (Radio Edit) – 3:57
B1. "Sexual Revolution" (Latin Club Mix) – 6:26
B2. "Sexual Revolution" (Latin Radio Edit) – 3:58

- Swedish CD single
1. "King Midas" (Radio Edit) – 3:57
2. "Sexual Revolution" (Latin Radio Edit) – 3:58
- Swedish CD maxi-single
1. "King Midas" (Radio Edit) – 3:57
2. "Sexual Revolution" (Latin Radio Edit) – 3:58
3. "King Midas" (Manhattan Massacre Mix) – 6:04
4. "King Midas" (Bass Nation's 4 Seasons Mix) – 6:10
5. "Sexual Revolution" (Latin Club Mix) – 6:26

== Charts ==
Weekly chart performance for "King Midas"
Chart (1996)	Peak position
Sweden (Sverigetopplistan)	31
