= Dominika Peczynski =

Polish-Swedish singer and entertainer (born 1970)

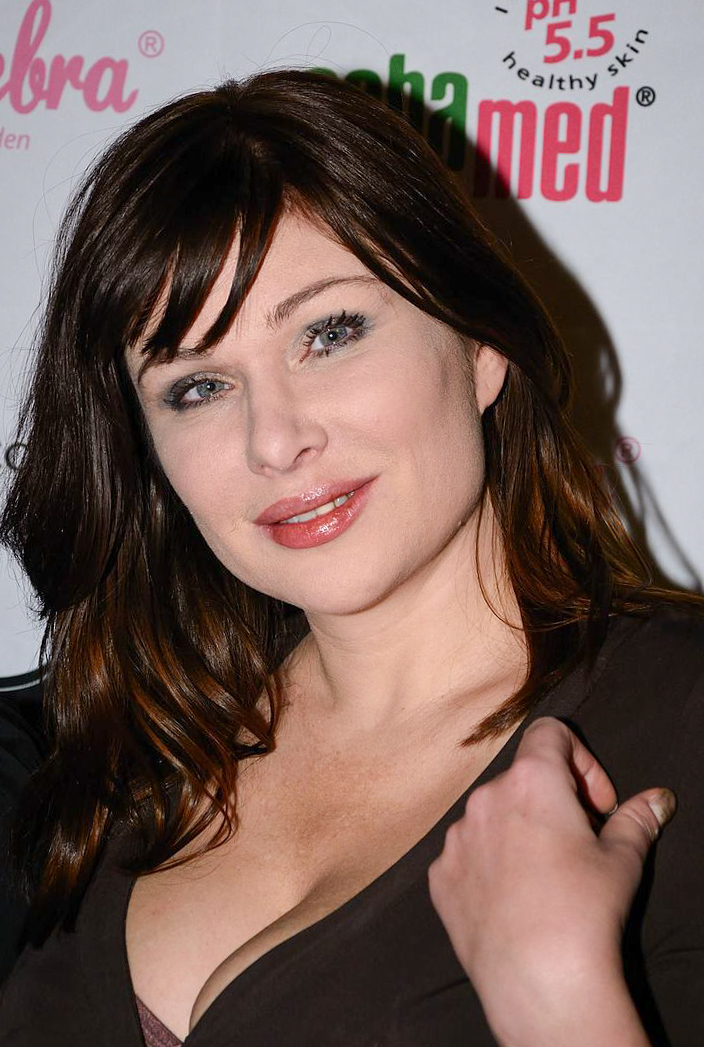
- Peczynski in 2011

Background information
- Born: 20 September 1970 (age 55); Warsaw, Poland
- Genres: Pop
- Occupations: Singer; model; television host
- Years active: 1989–present
- Spouse: Anders Borg (m. 2018; div. 2022)

Dominika Peczynski (born 20 September 1970) is a Polish-Swedish singer, model and television host.

== Early life ==
She was born on 20 September 1970 in Warsaw, Poland.

== Army of Lovers ==
She joined the Swedish pop music group Army of Lovers in 1992, making her debut with the group with "Hasta Mañana", a cover of the ABBA song. Peczynski already knew the other members of Army of Lovers; Michaela Dornonville de la Cour and Camilla Henemark worked for the same Modeling agency as she; she had been at school with Jean-Pierre Barda and had previously had a relationship with Alexander Bard.

== Post Army of Lovers ==
After Army of Lovers split, she worked as a TV presenter for a number of different Swedish and overseas shows, including the Swedish version of Temptation Island and her own program, Dominika's Planet, which aired in the UK. In 1998, she posed for the adult magazine Playboy.

In 2002 she launched a public relations company.

In 2005 a music project called Nouveau Riche was launched, featuring Peczynski and Ulrich Bermsjö. Their debut single "Oh Lord" was released in November 2005. Following the release of their second single "Hardcore Life", Peczynski left the band. After several weeks, she was replaced by another female singer and her contributions to the band were removed from all subsequent releases and marketing tools.

She competed in the celebrity dance show Let's Dance 2017, broadcast on TV4.

In 2018, Peczynski founded Treatya.com, a booking platform for beauty treatments at home.

== Personal life ==
Peczynski grew up in a Jewish family. She has two children: a daughter with Claes Bahri and a son with Yoav Bartal. Peczynski and Sweden's former Minister of Finance Anders Borg began a relationship in 2015, and they married on 3 November 2018. On 22 June 2022, Peczynski announced that she and Borg had filed for divorce.
