= Camilla Henemark =

Swedish singer, actress, political spokesperson, and former fashion model

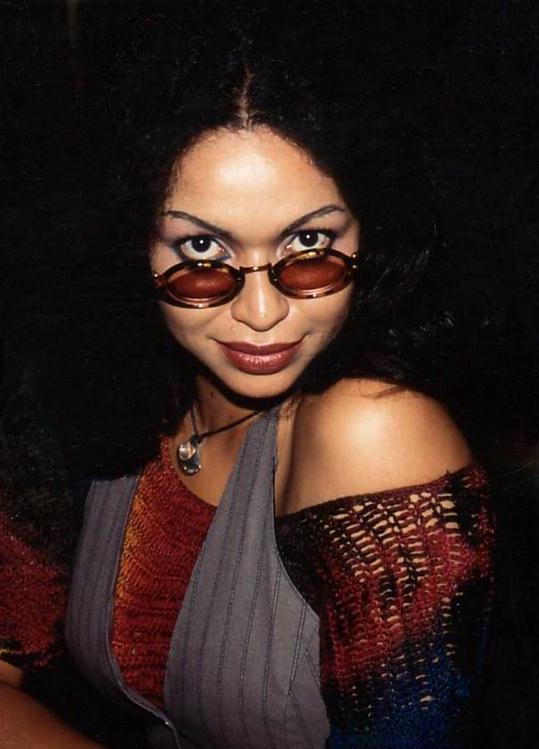
- Henemark in 1993

Background information
- Also known as: La Camilla
- Born: Camilla Maria Henemark; 23 October 1964 (age 62); Stockholm, Sweden
- Genre: Pop
- Occupations: Actress, singer, political spokesperson, former fashion model, entertainer
- Years active: 1980–present
- Formerly of: Army of Lovers

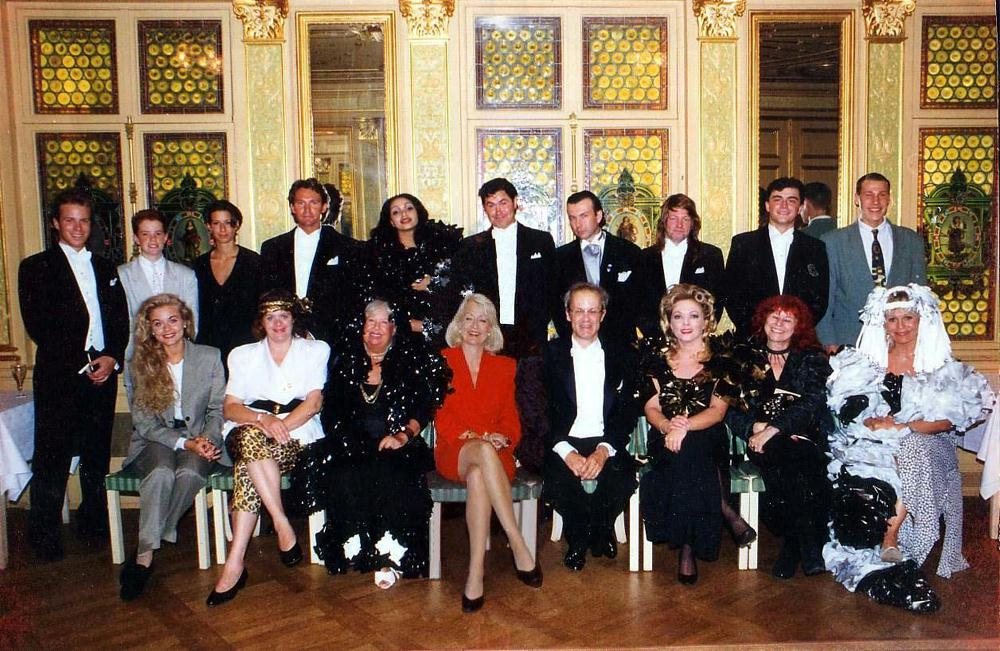
Henemark (standing fifth from left) joined other celebrities in Stockholm to celebrate the 100th anniversary of the birth of Mae West in 1993.

Camilla Maria Henemark (born 23 October 1964), also known as La Camilla, is a Swedish singer, actress, political spokesperson, and former fashion model. She is best known as a founding member and visual front figure of the pop group Army of Lovers.

Henemark began her career as a model in her teens before transitioning into music in the mid‑1980s. As La Camilla, she became widely recognized for her work with Army of Lovers, appearing on two of the group's early albums and later rejoining them for several reunion projects. Outside the group, she pursued a solo music career, releasing singles such as “Everytime You Lie”, which reached number 31 on the Swedish Singles Chart in 1992. She has also worked extensively in film and television, and remains active in Swedish media and entertainment. She has also maintained a long-standing presence in Swedish entertainment through film, television, theatre, and media appearances, alongside her public engagement in social and political issues.

== Biography ==
Henemark was born in Stockholm to a Nigerian father and a Swedish mother. She began modelling in her teens and later ran her own modeling agency.

She entered music in 1985, joining Alexander Bard in his Barbie project under the name Katanga. The project evolved into Army of Lovers, where Henemark, using the stage name "La Camilla", became the group’s visual front figure. After two albums with the group, she left to pursue a solo career, releasing several singles including “Everytime You Lie”, which reached number 31 on the Swedish Singles Chart in 1992. Her planned solo album Temper (1996) was eventually released in 2012 by Universal Music.

Henemark rejoined Army of Lovers several times. In 1995 for "Les Greatest Hits", in 2000 for "Le Grand Docu-Soap", and in 2013 for the reunion album "Big Battle of Egos". Her involvement ended after the group’s Melodifestivalen 2013 entry failed to qualify.

Outside music, Henemark has worked in film and television and continued modelling, appearing in magazine shoots, fashion editorials, and media photography. She is an active supporter of the Swedish Social Democratic Party. She was married to film director Anders Skog and later had a long-term relationship with pop star and music video director Stakka Bo (Johan Renck).

In 2010, the Swedish newspaper Aftonbladet published excerpts from the book Den motvillige monarken ("The Reluctant Monarch"), alleging a late‑1990s affair between Henemark and King Carl XVI Gustaf.

Henemark has been diagnosed with attention deficit hyperactivity disorder (ADHD) and Asperger syndrome.

== Discography ==
=== Albums ===
Title	Album details	Peak chart positions
Title	Album details	SWE
Temper	Recorded: 1995–1996; Originally planned for release in 1996 (cancelled); Released: 2012 (CD reissue, Universal Music)	—
"—" denotes items that did not chart or were not released in that territory.

=== Singles ===
Title	Year	Peak position^{SWE}	Album
Everytime You Lie	1992	31	Non‑album single
Give Me Your Love (Je t'aime) (with Steve Blame)	1993	—	Non‑album single
The Witch in Me	1996	—	Temper
I'm Not in the Mood for Lovers	1996	—	Temper
Russians Are Coming (with Danko)	1999	—	Non‑album single
David & Goliath (with Neverland Project)	2010	—	Back On Earth
Don't Try To Steal My Limelight (with Miss Inga and Dominika Peczynski)	2011	—	Non‑album single
Zoom Zoom Jul (feat. Dogge Doggelito)	2020	—	Non‑album single
"—" denotes items that did not chart or were not released in that territory.

== Filmography ==
=== Films ===
- 1997 – Adam & Eva – Cameo
- 1998 – Kontakt – Segment: Teater
- 2000 – Sex, lögner & videovåld – Herself
- 2000 – Once in a Lifetime – Cameo
- 2001 – Jarrett – The Deadly Encounter – Chairman at EU Summit

=== Theatre ===
- 1995 – Fyra Friares Fiaskon
- 2001 – White Christmas
- 2025 – Stormen (Sveriges Radio Drama – Scenen: Shakespeare för alla) – Ariel (portrayed as an OnlyFans star)

=== Television ===
- 1994 – Sjunde Himlen – Host
- 1997 – Kenny Starfighter (miniseries) – Nurse
- 1997 – Så ska det låta – Herself
- 2000 – Vita lögner – Co-host (one episode)
- 2003 – Big Brother (Swedish version) – Guest

=== Music videos ===
- 1992 – La Camilla – "Everytime You Lie" – Lead singer
- 1992 – Entombed – "Stranger Aeons" – Guest
- 1993 – Steve Blame featuting La Camilla – "Give Me Your Love (Je t’aime)" – Lead performer
- 1996 – La Camilla – "I'm Not In The Mood For Lovers" – Lead singer
- 2010 – The Neverland Project featuring La Camilla – "David & Goliath" – Lead performer
- 2011 – Happy Hoes – "Don’t Try To Steal My Limelight" – Lead performer
