= Anders Wollbeck =

Swedish musician

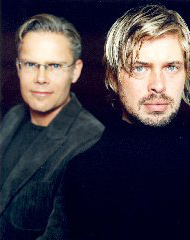
Wollbeck (left) with Vacuum colleague Mattias Lindblom.

Anders Wilhelm Axel Wollbeck (born 10 February 1958 in Stockholm) is a Swedish songwriter and producer. He plays the guitar and keyboard. He is part of the songwriting and production duo Vacuum together with Mattias Lindblom.

== Career ==
Wollbeck has worked with a number of artists in his career including Army of Lovers, Alcazar, Midi, Maxi & Efti, Vacuum, Rachel Stevens, Monrose, Tarja Turunen, Cinema Bizarre, Vengaboys, and Tata Young. A number of songs co-written by Wollbeck have become international hits. He has also written and produced soundtrack music for the Tatort episode Kalter Engel.

== Personal life ==
Wollbeck is married to Marie Sundström-Wollbeck, who designed most of Army of Lovers sleeves. The couple has two children and resides in Stockholm.

== Selected discography ==
- "Crucified", "Obsession" and Ride The Bullet by Army of Lovers. Crucified was featured in the multi million selling computer game Just Dance 4 in 2012. A re-recorded version of the song peaked at number 18 in 2014 in the Billboard Dance/Club Chart.
- "Crying at the Discoteque" by Alcazar. Covered by Sophie Ellis-Bextor on the top 10 UK album Songs from the Kitchen Disco
- "I Breathe" by Vacuum (Gold sales in Sweden)
- "I Walk Alone", "Die Alive", "Into The Sun", "Victim of Ritual" "Innocence", and "Diva" by Tarja Turunen
- "Home" by Julie Berthelsen (2xPlatinum sales in Denmark)
- "What You Don’t Know" by Monrose. #6 in Germany.
- "Negotiate with Love" by Rachel Stevens.
- "Accidental" by Garou. From the album Piece of My Soul, Gold sales in Canada, Poland and Russia.
- "Rocket To Uranus" by Vengaboys
- "Gib Mer A Chance" by Baschi. Gold sales in Switzerland.
- "Beginning" by Girls' Generation
- "Heavensent", "The Other People" and "Get Off" by Cinema Bizarre from the top ten German album Final Attraction
- "Love Is The Law" by Tata Young
- "Wild Like That" by Jeanette Biedermann
- "Your Life" by Till Brönner from the German top ten album At The End Of The Day
- "Chu" by f(x) (Platinum sales in South Korea)
- "I Only Know How To Love by The Tenors featured on the Billboard number one album "The Canadian Tenors"
- "Y3K" by Tohoshinki featured on the number one Japan and Global Album Chart album TIME
- "You Set Fire To My Life", "Out Of The Blue", "Karma" and "Love Falls" by Tina Arena. (Platinum Sales in Australia)
- "Eventide", "Crime Of Passion", "Diva Time", "I Am The Sea" and "When The Music Dies" by Nad Sylvan. Nominated for the 2017 Progressive Music Awards .
- "Spaceship Earth", "Hear Me" and "Nostalgia" by Burningfields
- "Sanctified" by Black Shark Club

== Board of Directors assignments ==
- STIM (Swedish Performing Rights Society. From 2015)
- SKAP (The Swedish Society of Songwriters, Composers and Authors. From 2016, President from 2024)
- Export Music Sweden (Organization for promoting Swedish music outside of Sweden. From 2016)
- Extended Licensing Committee of ICE Services Ltd (Joint venture by STIM, GEMA and PRS For Music. From 2016)
- UniSong (Organization for Swedish songwriters and producers. From 2012)
