= Army of Lovers =

Swedish pop band

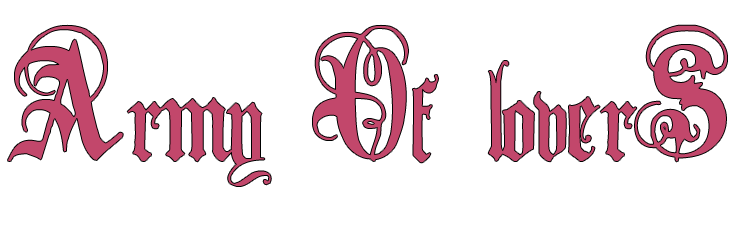

Background information
- Origin: Stockholm, Sweden
- Genres: Dance-pop; Europop
- Works: Army of Lovers discography
- Years active: 1987–1996, 2001–2009, 2012–present
- Labels: Sonet (1987–1988); Ton Son Ton (1988–1992); Stockholm (1992–2001); Universal (1998–present); Sofo (2013–present)
- Members: Alexander Bard (1987–1996, 2012–present); Jean-Pierre Barda (1987–1996, 2012–present); Dominika Peczynski (1992–1996, 2013–present)
- Past members: Camilla Henemark (1987–1991, 1995–1996, 2012–2013); Michaela de la Cour (1991–1995)
- Website: armyoflovers.eu

Army of Lovers is a Swedish dance-pop group which formed in 1987 and had a number of hits in Europe throughout the 1990s. Some of their biggest successes include the song "Crucified", which was a big hit in Europe, charting 31 weeks in the Eurochart and peaking at number 14 in 1992. It remains their best-known song internationally. Their second international hit, "Obsession", charted 32 weeks and peaked at number 29.

The name of the band alludes to the documentary film Army of Lovers or Revolt of the Perverts by German gay rights activist Rosa von Praunheim, the title of which in turn alludes to the Sacred Band of Thebes.

== History ==
=== Overview ===
The founding members, who had all worked together in a band called Barbie, were Alexander Bard, Jean-Pierre Barda, and Camilla Henemark (aka La Camilla).

Army of Lovers had many top 10 hits on the Eurochart, the biggest being "Crucified", which was one of the biggest-selling European singles of 1991. Their total album sales were seven million copies worldwide.

The band became famous for their outlandish visual appearance (many of their costumes were created by Camilla Thulin), and their high camp music videos directed by Fredrik Boklund.

While Alexander Bard was the brain behind the band, Jean-Pierre Barda was the lead vocalist on hits such as "Crucified" and "Israelism". Bard and Barda were the only two band members who were present throughout all of the band's various line-ups. When Henemark left in 1991, she was replaced by Michaela de la Cour. In 1992, Dominika Peczynski joined, making the band a four-piece. In 1995, De la Cour left and Henemark returned.

=== Early success and breakup: 1987–1996 ===
Although both "Obsession" and "Ride the Bullet" reached the top spot of the European charts, the group's presence in the US and the UK was limited to club chart successes (though "Crucified" reached the Top 40 in the UK Singles Chart in February 1992).

While they focused on experimenting with various club sounds and samples on their first album, Disco Extravaganza (later re-issued as Army of Lovers in the US), the artists released a proper pop/dance album with Massive Luxury Overdose. The record spawned their biggest hits ("Crucified", "Ride the Bullet", and "Obsession") and managed to sell 250,000 copies in Germany alone. Massive Luxury Overdose was later re-issued for the US market, featuring a new cover and four brand new tracks. Their third album, The Gods of Earth and Heaven, was never released in the US. The first single from the album, "Israelism", received radio airplay in several European countries and topped the charts in Israel despite being subject to criticism. Their fourth album, Glory Glamour and Gold (1994), was supported by a club tour across Germany, where the band promoted same-sex marriage. In 1995, Army of Lovers released their first best-of compilation entitled Les Greatest Hits, which included three new songs. One year later, it was re-released with one additional new song called "King Midas", which replaced "Stand up for Myself". It was written by Jonas Berggren from Ace of Base.

By this point, they had released four studio albums, made over twenty music videos, and become successful across Eastern Europe before Bard disbanded the group to concentrate on his new group Vacuum in 1996.

=== Reunion: 2001–2009 ===
Army of Lovers reformed briefly in 2001 to celebrate the 10th anniversary since their breakthrough with the release of another best-of compilation called Le Grand Docu-Soap. The compilation contained three covers, including "Let the Sunshine In" and "Hands Up".

=== Further reunions, releases, and shows: 2011–present ===
Two members of Army of Lovers (Henemark and Peczynski) reunited in June 2011 and appeared as guest vocalists on "Don't Try to Steal My Limelight", a single by Swedish drag artist and blogger Miss Inga. The three later formed the band Happy Hoes and released "We Rule the World", followed by a Christmas song entitled "Happy Ho Ho Ho". Happy Hoes performed at Pride 2012. Army of Lovers reformed with Alexander Bard, Camilla Henemark, and Jean-Pierre Barda in late 2012 to enter the Melodifestivalen 2013 with the song "Rockin' the Ride", in hopes of representing Sweden in the Eurovision Song Contest 2013 in Malmö. Their entry did not reach the finals of the Melodifestivalen. Just a few days after their performance, Bard explained to the press that Camilla Henemark had been kicked out once again and that Dominika Peczynski had returned. This was followed by a public fight between Bard and Peczynski against Henemark.

A new best-of compilation, with four new songs, called Big Battle of Egos, was announced for release on 27 March 2013, to be followed by a single and video called "Signed on My Tattoo", a duet between Army of Lovers and Alexander Bard with his other pop group Gravitonas.

In June 2013, an EP called Scandinavian Crime was released, which included re-recorded versions of "Rockin' The Ride" and "Tragedy", originally from their CD Big Battle of Egos. These new versions featured new vocals by Peczynski and Jean-Pierre Barda, replacing the parts originally sung by Camilla Henemark. On 1 July 2013, the video for "Crucified 2013" premiered on Expressen TV. The song was a revamped version of the band's breakthrough hit from 1991 and was chosen as the official anthem for Copenhagen Pride 2013.

In November 2023, the band released the album Sexodus, which was remixed the following year under the title Remixodus.

== Band members ==
Current

- Alexander Bard – vocals, guitar, bass, piano, keyboards, programming (1987–1996, 2012–present)
- Jean-Pierre Barda – vocals, keyboards, drums, percussion, programming (1987–1996, 2012–present)
- Dominika Peczynski – vocals, guitar, bass (1992–1996, 2013–present)

Past

- Camilla Henemark – vocals, guitar, bass (1987–1991, 1995–1996, 2012–2013)
- Michaela de la Cour – vocals, keyboards, programming (1991–1995)

Timeline

== Discography ==
- Disco Extravaganza (1990)
- Massive Luxury Overdose (1991)
- The Gods of Earth and Heaven (1993)
- Glory Glamour and Gold (1994)
- Sexodus (2023)

== See also ==
- List of Swedes in music
