= Jean-Pierre Barda =

Swedish and Israeli singer, actor, make up artist

Jean-Pierre Barda ז'אן פייר ברדה
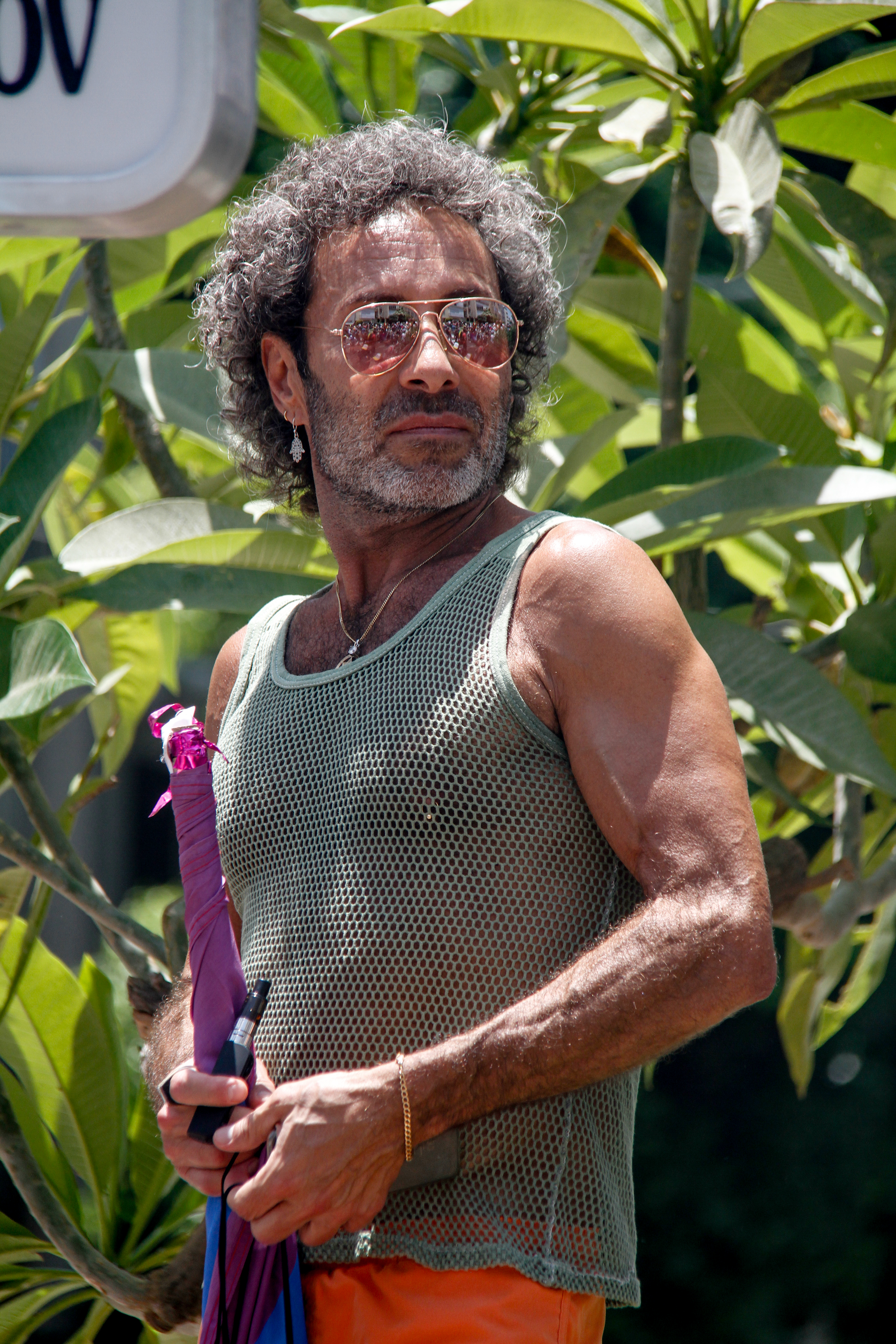
- Barda in June 2018

Background information
- Also known as: Farouk
- Born: Michel Jean-Pierre Barda; 7 March 1965 (age 61); Paris, France
- Genres: Pop
- Occupations: Singer; musician; actor; make up artist; hair dresser
- Instruments: Vocals, drums, keyboards
- Labels: Sonet; Stockholm; Universal; Sofo

Michel Jean-Pierre Barda (Hebrew: ז'אן פייר ברדה; born 7 March 1965) is a Swedish and Israeli singer, actor, make up artist and hair dresser of French/Algerian Jewish descent. He is one of the founding members of the pop group Army of Lovers.

== Biography ==
Jean-Pierre Barda was born in Paris, France. His father was of Algerian Jewish origin. When he was seven, he moved to Sweden with his family, settling in Stockholm. Barda immigrated to Israel in 2015. He currently lives in Tel Aviv. He has been openly gay since he came out at age 16. His parents kicked him out for his sexuality, and he did not have contact with them for 15 years after.

== Music and acting career ==
Barda started out working with Alexander Bard as a part of the music group Barbie. He initially called himself Farouk, but reverted to his real name when Barbie later evolved into the group Army of Lovers. Barda has been with the group throughout all of its incarnations.

In 2004, Barda considered joining a new band called Bodies Without Organs. This did not come to fruition, and Barda's explicit involvement extended only as far as co-writing BWO's first single "Living in a Fantasy".

Barda is also known as a hair-dresser and make-up artist. He has starred in movies, television and photo shoots.

== Theater ==
- Min Mamma Herr Albin (Swedish version of La Cage Aux Folles) (1995) – the butler

== Film ==
- "Army of Lovers in the Holy Land" (2018) — himself
- Once in a Lifetime (2000) – himself
- House of Angels – The Second Summer(1994) – himself

== TV ==
- Rik Och Berömd (Swedish version of Lifestyles of the Rich and Famous) – host
- Miss Sweden 2002 Competition – host
- Sally (1999) – himself
- Silikon (1999–2001) – make-over artist/host

== See also ==
- Europop
- Music of Israel
- Music of Sweden
