= Alexander Bard =

Musician, record producer, author, and activist

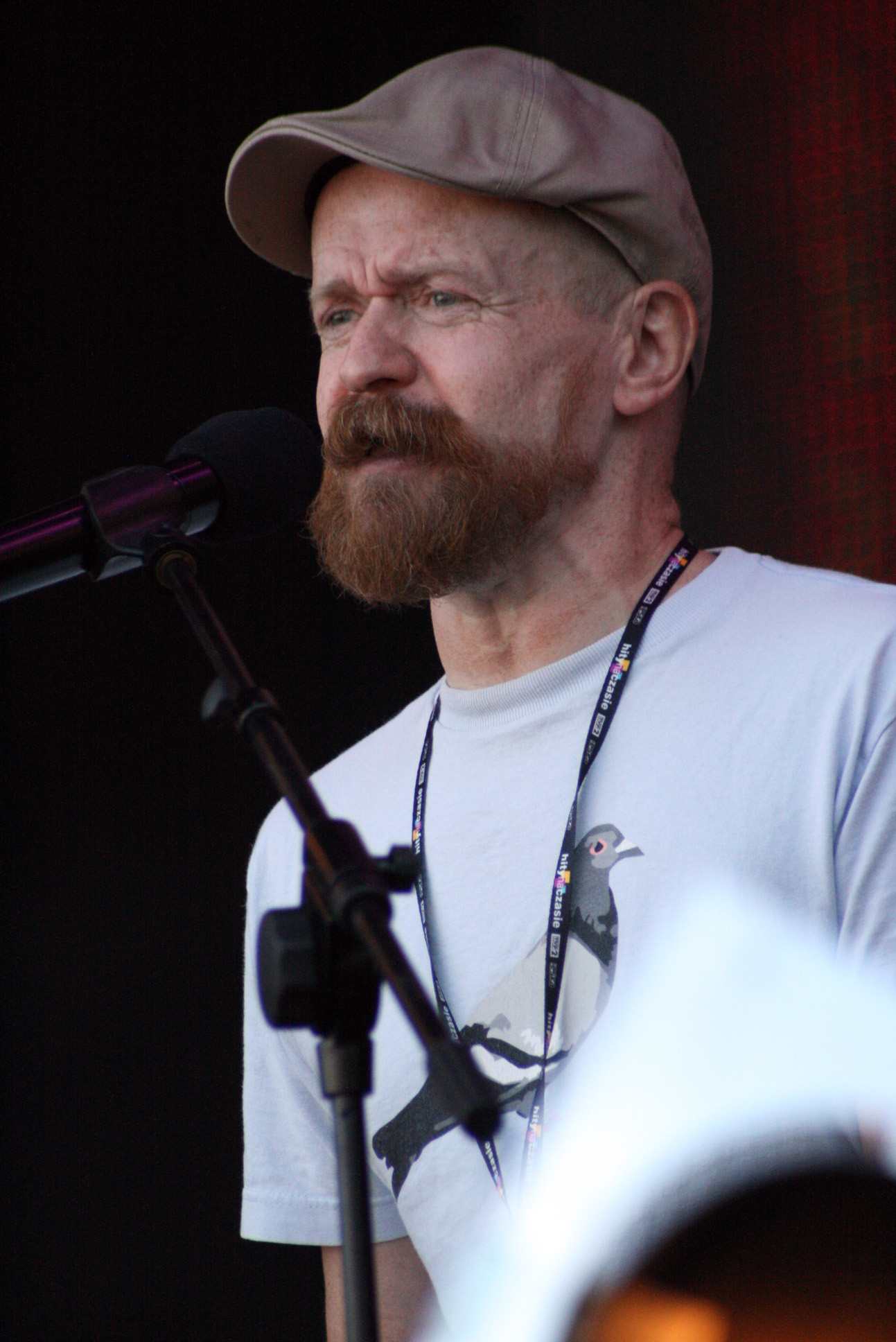
- Bard in 2007
- Born: Alexander Bengt Magnus Bard; 17 March 1961 (age 65); Motala, Sweden
- Occupations: Singer; songwriter; musician; author; lecturer; philosopher
- Years active: 1982–present
- Musical career
- Genres: Pop; electronica
- Instruments: Vocals; guitar; piano; keyboards

Alexander Bengt Magnus Bard (born 17 March 1961) is a Swedish musician, author, lecturer, artist, songwriter, music producer, TV personality, religious and political activist, and one of the founders of the Syntheist religious movement alongside his co-author Jan Söderqvist. Bard is a member of music band Army of Lovers.

== Background and education ==
Bard was born in Medevi, Motala Municipality, Sweden on 17 March 1961. After he completed his upper secondary education, Bard studied in the United States and in Amsterdam, Netherlands. While living in Amsterdam, he earned part of his living as a sex worker. Bard returned to Sweden to study at the Stockholm School of Economics from 1984 to 1989. In addition to his studies in economics, he took a strong interest in philosophy and social theory with the explicit aim of becoming a philosophy writer and lecturer.

== Musical career ==
Bard began his musical career in 1982 with the single Life in a Goldfish Bowl released under the name Baard, a synth-punk fusion project he had formed together with two female striptease dancers. He later had some minor success as Barbie, which saw Bard performing ironic bubblegum pop songs crossdressed.

After abandoning work on a second Barbie album, Bard formed Army of Lovers with two of Barbie's entourage, Jean-Pierre Barda and La Camilla. Army of Lovers had several pan-European hits, the biggest being Crucified and Obsession, while their presence in the US and the UK was limited to repeated club chart successes. They released five studio albums, made over twenty music videos, and became phenomenally successful across Eastern Europe, before Bard disbanded the group in 1996. Army of Lovers have later earned a widespread iconic status in the gay culture, often referred to as a perfect example of the postmodern take on the ideals of camp. Bard said, “I'm gay. I always fall back on camp or gay as a frame of reference. Then camp doesn't always have to be gay and gay doesn't always have to be camp.” Bard also worked on the production & composition of Swedish girlgroup Midi, Maxi & Efti.

Following the demise of Army of Lovers, Bard founded Vacuum, a symphonic synthpop project featuring Bard, Marina Schiptjenko (formerly of synthpop group Page), and newcomer Mattias Lindblom. Their debut single I Breathe was one of the fastest selling singles in Sweden in 1997 and also topped the singles chart in Italy. Further releases did not do as well, except in Russia and Ukraine, and Bard left after only two albums. He reformed Army of Lovers briefly in 2000 for a handful of new tracks and a greatest hits collection, and later co-wrote and co-produced the first two Alcazar albums.

In 2005, Bard launched a new music project called BWO (short for Bodies Without Organs), together with Marina Schiptjenko and new vocalist Martin Rolinski. Their debut album Prototype generated seven top 20 hit singles in Scandinavia and across Eastern Europe and reached platinum status. A second album Halcyon Days, was released in April 2006, which shipped gold and generated four additional hit singles. 2007 saw the release of a third album, Fabricator, followed by a 2008 compilation album and the 2009 release of a fourth studio album, Big Science.

In April 2010, Bard announced that he was working with co-producer Henrik Wikström on a new project called Gravitonas, signed to Universal Music worldwide. The project, described as electro-rock, and fronted by Bard himself and vocalist Andreas Öhrn, released a first digital EP in May 2010 and had its first charts hits in Sweden and Russia in the autumn of 2010. Since they refuse to release physical records tied to traditional promotional media campaigns and instead strictly release their music through streaming and downloads and in EP rather than album format, Gravitonas have been dubbed "The World's First Spotify Band" by bloggers and the music press. Bard's public friendship with Spotify founder Daniel Ek has played into this narrative. In addition to several No. 1 hit records across the European continent, Gravitonas have also achieved a considerable following as dance act in the U.S., with three hit records to date in the Billboard Top 50 Club Play Chart.

Aside from the groups mentioned above, Alexander Bard has also worked as a songwriter and producer for several Swedish artists, in the 1980s mainly with Ola Håkansson and Tim Norell, in the early 1990s with Anders Wollbeck and Per Adebratt—especially on the early 1990s Columbia Records—signed African cult act Midi Maxi & Efti—and more recently mainly with Anders Hansson and Henrik Wikström.

Bard was a co-founder of Stockholm Records and runs several internet and music-related businesses. In August 2011, Bard joined the jury of the Swedish version of the Idol TV show, sharing the stage with Celine Dion's record producer Anders Bagge, quickly being referred to as The Scandinavian Simon Cowell due to his famously and characteristically harsh and straightforward commenting of the contestants.

Army of Lovers reunited in 2013, releasing a new compilation album titled Big Battle of Egos featuring four brand new tracks including lead single and video Signed on My Tattoo, a duet with Gravitonas. The band cited political reasons, including their outspoken opposition to increased homophobia and antisemitism in Europe, for the reunification, after which they headlined both the Pride festivities of 2013 in Copenhagen and Belgrade and several major TV shows in Sweden, Poland, Russia and Ukraine.

== Television career ==
Bard was a judge on the television show Swedish Idol, a spin-off of Pop Idol, between 2011 and 2015, and was a judge on Talang, the Swedish version of Got Talent, which is broadcast on TV4, from 2017. In June 2020, he was fired from that job following public backlash regarding a series of racially charged tweets from Bard.

== Literature and lecturing ==
Bard has written three books on the Internet revolution, collectively known as The Futurica Trilogy, together with media theorist Jan Söderqvist. Their first collaboration The Netocrats was originally released in Swedish in 2000, became available in English in 2003, and has since been translated to a further 16 languages with total worldwide sales exceeding 340,000 copies. The book presents a reading of history as the progression of different information technological paradigms, each with a dominant information technology and corresponding elite power triad. Where the printing press era created the power triad of academics, politicians and capitalists, the internet era will create a new power triad, known collectively as the Netocracy.

The second book The Global Empire was originally released in Swedish in 2003, while the third installment of the trilogy The Body Machines was originally published in Swedish in 2009. These latter two works were released in English in 2012, completing The Futurica Trilogy, in which the authors present their philosophical vision for a global and increasingly virtual society, as a consequence of the Internet revolution.

A fourth book from Bard & Söderqvist, Syntheism – Creating God in The Internet Age, was released in October 2014. The book focuses on participatory culture as the spirituality of the digital age and advocates a radical relationalism inspired by philosopher Alfred North Whitehead and physicist Niels Bohr as the antidote to the individualism of the collapsing capitalist age. It was followed by a fifth book called Digital Libido – Sex, Power and Violence in The Network Society, a Freudian and Nietzschean critique of the infantilization and existential crisis of contemporary society, in 2018 when Bard and Söderqvist also announced a larger plan where the Syntheism and Digital Libido books merely form the first and second installments of a planned second trilogy from the authors on the metaphysics of the internet age, tentatively titled Grand Narrative Trilogy. The working title of the third and final book in the trilogy is Process and Event, which proposes to explore the metaphysics and implications of cyclical time (nomadology) and linear time (eventology).

Bard has given public lectures since 1997, including three TEDx presentations (as of 2013), with a major focus on the social implications of the Internet revolution and has become one of the leading speakers on the international management theory lecturing circuit.

== Politics ==
Alexander Bard has long been a vocal opponent of laws against personal drug consumption and laws against prostitution in Sweden. Having earlier been a member of — or worked closely with members of — the Liberals, the Center party and the Pirate Party, he joined the newly founded Citizens' Coalition in 2018. He departed that party in December 2019, following disagreements about both party goals and how to best achieve them. He later rejoined the Liberals. Following a conversation between the Liberals and Bard regarding several racially charged tweets made by Bard in June 2020, the Liberals announced his departure from the party once again. Bard rejoined the Citizens’ Coalition. As of 2023 he considers himself to be a far-right Marxist, having earlier considered himself to be a Libertarian Marxist.

On 14 March 2026, he announced that he was joining the Liberals for a third time after the leader of the struggling party, Simona Mohamsson, embraced Jimmie Åkesson at a press conference and promised to allow the Sweden Democrats into a future government, something the Liberals had previously opposed.

== Personal life ==
Bard converted to the Iranian original branch of Zoroastrianism in 1992 after years of intense religious studies. He explains his decision to convert in his book Syntheism – Creating God in The Internet Age with Jan Söderqvist by stating that without a solid foundation in philosophical and theological history, the idea of Syntheism as a set of new religious ideas for a globalized and digitalized world in the 21st century, would not carry its necessary weight. The conversion could also be understood when Bard and Söderqvist place Zoroastrianism next to Taoism and Buddhism in their work in what they refer to as The Silk Route Triad, as the historical peak of religious thought and practice.

Bard describes himself as a bisexual man.

== Bibliography ==
- The Netocrats, with Jan Söderqvist (2000)
- The Global Empire, with Jan Söderqvist (2002)
- The Body Machines, with Jan Söderqvist (2009)
- The Futurica Trilogy, with Jan Söderqvist (2012)
- Syntheism – Creating God in the Internet Age, with Jan Söderqvist (2014)
- Digital Libido – Sex, power and violence in the network society, with Jan Söderqvist (2018)
- Process And Event, with Jan Söderqvist (2023)

== See also ==
- Netocracy
- Syntheism
