= I Sometimes Wish I Was Famous: A Swedish Tribute to Depeche Mode =

Compilation album by various artists
- Released: May 1991
- Genres: Synth-pop; industrial; dark wave
- Label: Energy

I Sometimes Wish I Was Famous: A Swedish Tribute to Depeche Mode is a tribute album to the British band Depeche Mode, released in May 1991 by the Swedish label Energy Rekords to celebrate the 10th anniversary of Depeche Mode's debut single, "Dreaming of Me" (1981). It was the first tribute album to Depeche Mode.

The album title refers to "I Sometimes Wish I Was Dead", a song included on Depeche Mode's Speak & Spell album, also released in 1981.

== Track listing ==
=== Vinyl ===
All tracks are written by Martin L. Gore, except where noted.

Side A
No.	Title	Writer(s)	Performer	Length
1.	"Dreaming of Me"	Vince Clarke	Page	3:52
2.	"Something to Do"		Cat Rapes Dog	4:13
3.	"My Secret Garden"		Elegant Machinery	3:31
4.	"Ice Machine"	Clarke	S.P.O.C.K	3:11
5.	"Stripped"		Scene of Ritual	4:40
6.	"New Life"	Clarke	Cultivated Bimbo	3:29

Side B
No.	Title	Writer(s)	Performer	Length
1.	"Photographic"	Clarke	Pouppée Fabrikk	5:25
2.	"Fly on the Windscreen"		Dead Eyes Open	5:15
3.	"Blasphemous Rumours"		Inside Treatment	5:48
4.	"Puppets"	Clarke	Signal	4:13
5.	"Shouldn't Have Done That"		Systema the Affliction	5:35
Total length:				49:12

=== CD ===
All tracks are written by Martin L. Gore, except where noted.

No.	Title	Writer(s)	Performer	Length
1.	"Dreaming of Me"	Clarke	Page	3:49
2.	"Something to Do"		Cat Rapes Dog	4:18
3.	"My Secret Garden"		Elegant Machinery	3:33
4.	"Photographic"	Clarke	Pouppée Fabrikk	5:26
5.	"Puppets"	Clarke	Signal	4:20
6.	"Fly on the Windscreen"		Dead Eyes Open	5:20
7.	"Blasphemous Rumours"		Inside Treatment	5:52
8.	"New Life"	Clarke	Cultivated Bimbo	3:34
9.	"Stripped"		Scene of Ritual	4:45
10.	"Ice Machine"	Clarke	S.P.O.C.K	3:15
11.	"New Dress" (CD bonus)		Sol Niger	3:44
12.	"The Things You Said" (CD bonus)		One Hit Wonder	4:45
13.	"The Sun and the Rainfall" (CD bonus)		Ater Koma	5:30
14.	"To Have and to Hold" (CD bonus)		No Hotel	6:26
15.	"Never Let Me Down Again" (CD bonus)		Big Fish	5:40
16.	"Shouldn't Have Done That"		Systema the Affliction	5:34
Total length:				75:50
