= Angels Anger Overkill =

Compilation album by In Strict Confidence
- Released: 1998
- Genre: electro-industrial
- Label: Minuswelt Musikfabrik, Energy Rekords

Angels Anger Overkill is In Strict Confidence's first compilation album. This release combined tracks from Cryogenix and Face the Fear along with the track "Beautiful Pain" which had previously only been released on the early demo cassettes Sound Attack and Hell Inside/Hell Outside. This was the first release on In Strict Confidence's own label Minuswelt Musikfabrik, it was also released in Sweden on Energy Rekords under license from Zoth Ommog.

== Track listing ==
1. "Hero"
2. "Prediction (extended version)"
3. "Hidden Thoughts"
4. "Become An Angel"
5. "Industrial Love"
6. "Dementia"
7. "Inside"
8. "Alles In Mir"
9. "Burning Angel"
10. "Sudorific"
11. "Collapse"
12. "Falling Down"
13. "Sinner"
14. "Beautiful Pain"
