= Mavskegg =

Ukrainian filmmaker

Edward Mavskegg, known professionally as Mavskegg and previously as Edward 209, is a Ukrainian music video director and artist. His videos and images are works for pop, electro, rock, pop-rock, alternative, ebm, industrial and other music genres. Mavskegg directed music videos for In Strict Confidence, Paradise Lost, Implant featuring Jean-Luc De Meyer of FRONT 242, Attrition, Hocico, and Björk Innocence competition.

== Film (selection) ==
Director

- Celeste Kennicot (2016)
- The Cleopatrium: That Rules (2016 Short film)
- Deposit for the Courier (2014 Short film)
- Day of worker (2008 Short film)
- Sugar garden secret (2007 Short film)
- The ball (2006 Short film)

== Music videos (selection) ==
Director

- 2012 Bending and floating, Collide
- 2012 Shades of Grey, Ophelia Syndrome
- 2012 In the frequency, Collide
- 2011 Otra Noche En La Viruta, Otros Aires
- 2007 Drowning, Hocico
- 2007 Innocence (comp.), Björk
- 2007 The Enemy, Paradise Lost
- 2006 The Creature, Implant featuring Jean-Luc De Meyer of Front 242
- 2006 Heal Me, In Strict Confidence
- 2006 Brave New World, Technology
- 2005 A Girl Called Harmony, Attrition
- 2004 Seven Lives, In Strict Confidence

== Awards (selection) ==
- 2015 Atlas Awards, Best Animation, film "Deposit For The Courier".Boston, MA. U.S.A
- 2014 TOFF film festival . Official Selection, film "Deposit For The Courier".
- 2011 BBC Music Video Festival, Otra Noche En La Viruta for Otros Aires was included in ‘Best Europe’ . Greenwich, U.K.,
- 2006 Open Cinema International Short and Animation Film Festival. Saint Petersburg.RU.Special Merit Award for Music Video "Heal Me",(In Strict Confidence)
- 2006 Open Cinema International Short and Animation Film Festival. Saint Petersburg.RU.Nomination for Best Video Art: "The Creature" (Implant featuring Jean-Luc De Meyer of Front 242)
