= List of songs about Barcelona =

This list of songs about Barcelona is a list of songs referencing the city of Barcelona.

- "Barcelona" by Stephen Sondheim (1970)
- "Barcelona postal" by Jaume Sisa (1982)
- "Barcelona ciudad" by Loquillo (1983)
- "Barcelone" by Yves Simon (1983)
- "Barcelona" by Freddie Mercury & Montserrat Caballé (1987)
- "Indios de Barcelona" by Mano Negra (1988)
- "Barcelona i jo" by Joan Manuel Serrat (1989)
- "Barcelona Nights" by Ottmar Liebert (1990)
- "Gitana hechicera" by Peret (1992)
- "Hilton Barcelona" by Stef Bos (1994)
- "Barcelona" by Jewel (1998)
- "Barcelona" by Rufus Wainwright (1998)
- "Rumba de Barcelona" by Manu Chao (2002)
- "A Barcelona" by Manolo Escobar (2002)
- "Luna de Barcelona" by Skalariak (2003)
- "Barcelona" by BLØF (2003)
- "We're from Barcelona" by I'm from Barcelona (2006)
- "Barcelona Loves You" by I'm from Barcelona (2006)
- "Barcelona" by Louie Austen (2007)
- "Barcelona" by BWO (2008)
- "Barcelona en colors" by Gerard Quintana (2009)
- "Barcelona" by Obrint Pas (2011)
- "Barcelona" by Pectus (2012)
- "Barcelona" by George Ezra (2015)
- "Barcelona s'il·lumina" by Buhos (2016)
- "Barcelona" by Ed Sheeran (2017)
- "Barcelona" by The Night Flight Orchestra (2018)
- "Barcelona" by Alfred García (2018)
- "Barcelona" by Eleni Foureira (2019)
- "Barcelona" by Jack & Jack (2019)
- "Barcelona" by Brother Leo (2019)
- "A Song for Barcelona" by Jackson Browne (2021)
- "Barcelona" by Police Dog Hogan (2022)
- "Barcelona" by Ricardo Arjona (2025)
