= Astrogirl =

Astrogirl may refer to:

- AstroGirl, an American teenage magazine
- "Astrogirl", a song by S.P.O.C.K
- "Astrogirl", a song by Suede on their 2002 album A New Morning
- Astro Girl, a character in the manga series Astro Boy
