= Martin Rolinski =

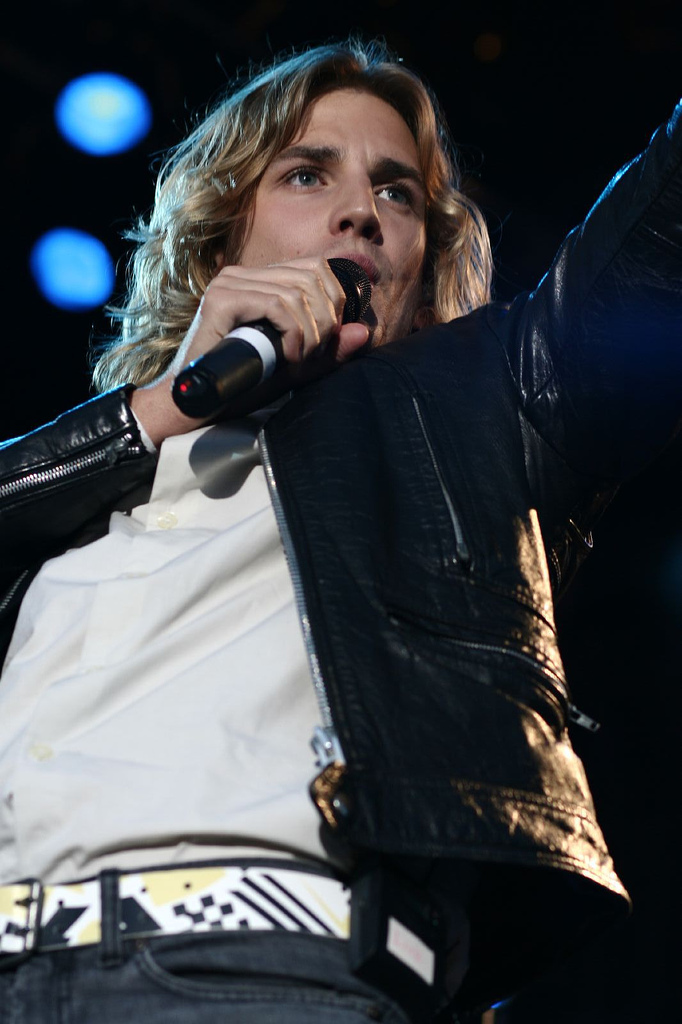

Background information
- Born: Martin Andrzej Rolinski; June 23, 1982 (age 44); Sweden
- Genres: Electropop
- Years active: 2001-present
- Formerly of: Bodies Without Organs

Martin Andrzej Rolinski (born June 23, 1982) is a Swedish singer of Polish origin and was the lead singer of the Swedish synthpop band Bodies Without Organs (now known as BWO).

== Popstars ==
Rolinski started his music career in 2002 when he made a bet with his friends to go on an audition for Popstars, a TV reality show searching for new artists. He made it to the final group, but was eliminated in the middle of the season.

== Career ==
However, after Popstars in 2002, Martin worked with Anders Hansson, who was in contact with Alexander Bard. Through Hansson, Rolinski got in touch with Bard, and Roliński subsequently became the lead singer of Bard's new band Bodies Without Organs together with Marina Schiptjenko and Bard himself.

== Melodifestivalen 2013 ==
Martin took part in Melodifestivalen 2013 in a bid to represent Sweden in the Eurovision Song Contest. He sang "In and Out of Love" in the third Semi-final held 16 February 2013. Finishing 3rd/4th, he qualified to the "Second Chance" round on 2 March 2013. He lost his duel against Robin Stjernberg and his song "You", and was eliminated from the contest. Despite this, his song charted the following week in Sverigetopplistan, the official Swedish Singles Chart at number 37.

== Personal life ==
He was raised in Gothenburg, Sweden, with both parents originating from Poland. He is their only child and speaks fluent Polish. Martin studied automation and mechatronics at Chalmers University of Technology in Gothenburg. He married his fiancée, Katarina Jansson, on September 20, 2008. Together they have two daughters, Isabella (born 2009) and Maya (born 2012).

== Discography ==
=== Singles ===
Title	Year	Peak positions	Certification	Album
Title	Year	SWE	Certification	Album
"Blame It on a Decent Matter"	2012	–		
"In and Out of Love"	2013	22	GLF: Gold	Melodifestivalen 2013
