= Halcyon Nights =

Halcyon Nights may refer to:

- Halcyon Nights, a 2022 reissue of Ellie Goulding's album Halcyon Days
- Halcyon Nights, a remixed version of BWO's 2006 album Halcyon Days
