= Temple of Love =

Temple of Love may refer to:

- "Temple of Love" (BWO song), 2006
- "Temple of Love" (The Sisters of Mercy song), 1983
- Temple de l'Amour, a structure at the Palace of Versailles
