= The Hardest Heart =

Studio album by In Strict Confidence
- Released: November 25, 2016
- Genre: Electronic music
- Length: 54:35
- Label: Minuswelt Musikfabrik, Metropolis Records

In Strict Confidence chronology
Utopia (2012)	The Hardest Heart (2016)

The Hardest Heart is In Strict Confidence's ninth studio album. Released only a month after it was originally announced October 19, 2016. It was released as a CD, Limited Double CD and Limited Edition box which also contained Face the Fear on cassette.

Regarding the long wait between albums, front-man Dennis Ostermann told Side-Line magazine:

You need one thing when it comes to new In Strict Confidence album releases: patience. Although we could have shortened the wait, we compensated for the delay with two preliminary singles. All signs pointed to the fact that we can focus on our own strong points, we can focus on well- known classics and, while pushing the doors open, we can make our way forward.

— Dennis Ostermann

== Artwork ==
The artwork was created by Stefan Heilemann who previously collaborated with In Strict Confidence with his award-winning 2011 art book "Laugh, cry and scream", which had an accompanying CD of their music. He has also created artwork for bands such as Lindemann, Kamelot, Nightwish and Megaherz.

== Critical reception ==
The album reached number 2 album in the Deutsche Alternative Charts in early 2017 and the song Herz reached number 9 as a single.

== Track listing ==
All lyrics are written by In Strict Confidence; all music is composed by In Strict Confidence.

No.	Title	Length
1.	"Frozen Kisses"	3:35
2.	"Everything Must Change"	5:28
3.	"Somebody Else's Dream"	4:45
4.	"Destroy Something Beautiful"	3:33
5.	"Time"	4:57
6.	"Herz"	5:00
7.	"Land of Grace"	4:13
8.	"Doublefaced"	4:52
9.	"Letzer Wille"	3:38
10.	"Erde Ade"	4:41
11.	"Ask Your Soul"	4:41
12.	"Coming Closer"	5:12
Total length:		54:35

== Singles and EPs ==
- Somebody Else's Dream
- Everything Must Change
- Herz & Frozen Kisses
