= BWO (band) =

Swedish electropop group

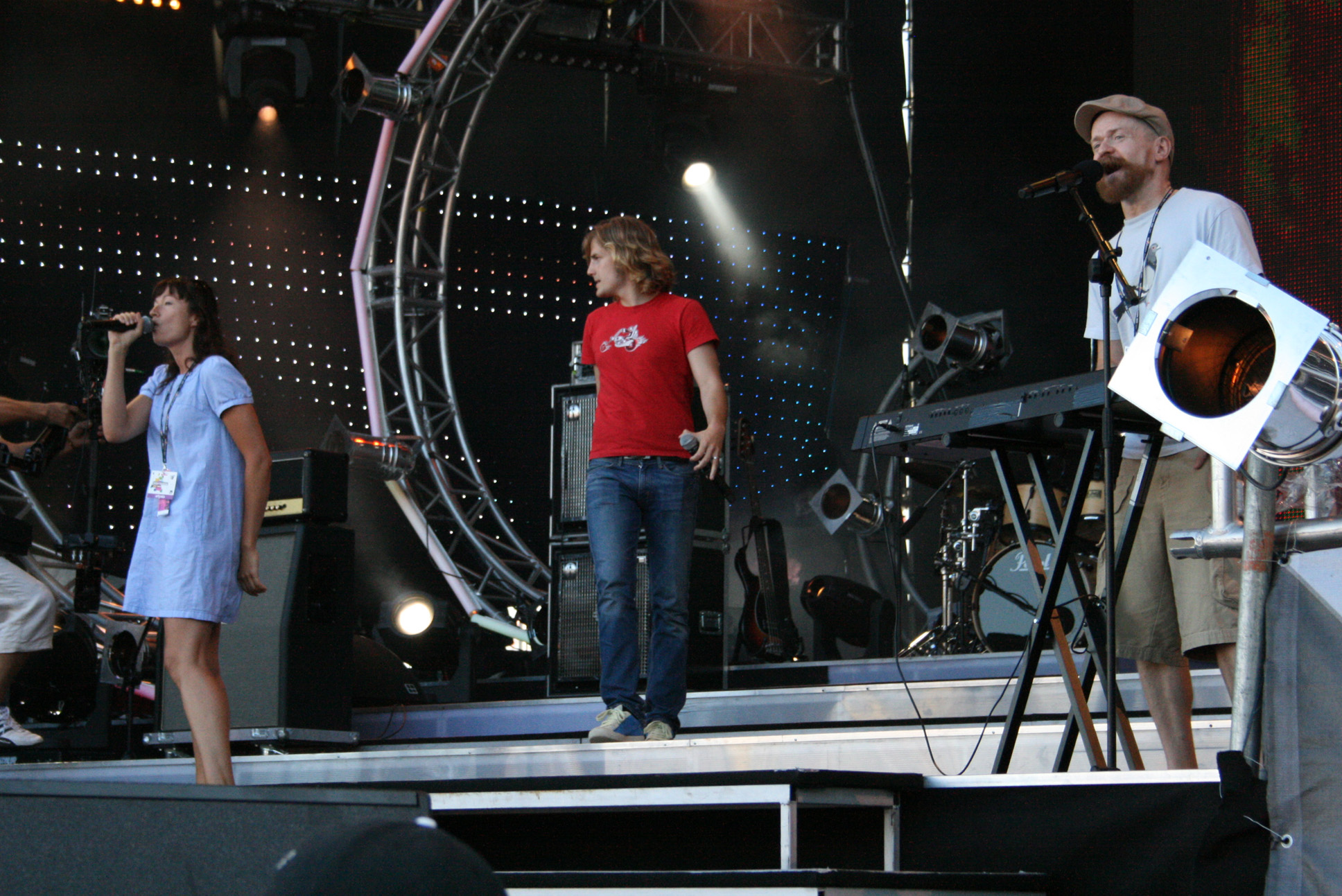
- BWO in 2008: Marina Schiptjenko, Martin Rolinski, and Alexander Bard

Background information
- Also known as: Bodies Without Organs
- Origin: Sweden
- Genres: Dance, electropop, pop
- Years active: 2003–2010
- Labels: Bonnier Music (Scandinavia and Eastern Europe); Universal Music Domestic (Germany, Austria and Switzerland); Magic Records (Poland); Shell Records (UK)
- Past members: Martin Rolinski; Alexander Bard; Marina Schiptjenko

BWO was a Swedish electropop group, formed in 2003. Prior to early 2006 they used the name Bodies Without Organs. In Sweden they have enjoyed considerable commercial success throughout their career, so far notching up 15 Top 40 singles, including a Number 1 with "Temple of Love", and five Top 10 albums including a Number 1 with Halcyon Days, and have won several major Swedish music awards. The group scored major successes in countries like Russia.

Since the mid-2000s, BWO have had significant chart success in several Eastern European countries including Ukraine and Russia, and some moderate success in the United Kingdom, Switzerland, Germany, Norway, Denmark, Finland, and the United States. 2009 saw a major breakthrough for the band in Japan, China and Taiwan with the compilation album Sunshine in the Rain, targeted at the Asian market.

== Origins ==
Alexander Bard, whose previous music projects had included Army of Lovers, Vacuum and Alcazar, started work on a new project during 2003, working with the record producer Anders Hansson who became the band's co-producer. They auditioned over 35 different vocalists before meeting former Popstars contestant Martin Rolinski who was duly chosen as lead singer and Caroline McDowell backing vocals. Marina Schiptjenko, an art-dealer and a one-time member of Vacuum, then came on board as the third member of what became Bodies Without Organs.

There was initially a suggestion that the band would be a four-piece including Jean-Pierre Barda from Army of Lovers, but this did not come to fruition, and Barda's explicit involvement extended as co-writing the songs "Living In A Fantasy" (BWO's first single) and "European Psycho", both included on BWO's first album "Prototype" (It's odd that a picture of Barda turned up in the inner booklet of this album), and appearing on the videos "Conquering America", "Sixteen Tons of Hardware", "Open Door" and "The Bells of Freedom", in which Dominika Peczynski, also from Army of Lovers did make a cameo too.

The name of the band derives from the philosophical term body without organs, developed by French philosopher Gilles Deleuze and psychoanalyst Félix Guattari in their 1972 book Anti-Œdipus. Bard, an author and lecturer of philosophy, has referred to the ideas of Deleuze in his books "The Netocrats", "The Global Empire", and "The Body Machines", all co-written with Jan Söderqvist.

At no point has BWO been a full-time project for any of the band's members - Bard continues his other career as a philosopher, while Schiptjenko remains an art dealer in Stockholm and Rolinski has a Master of Science in Engineering and works in that field.

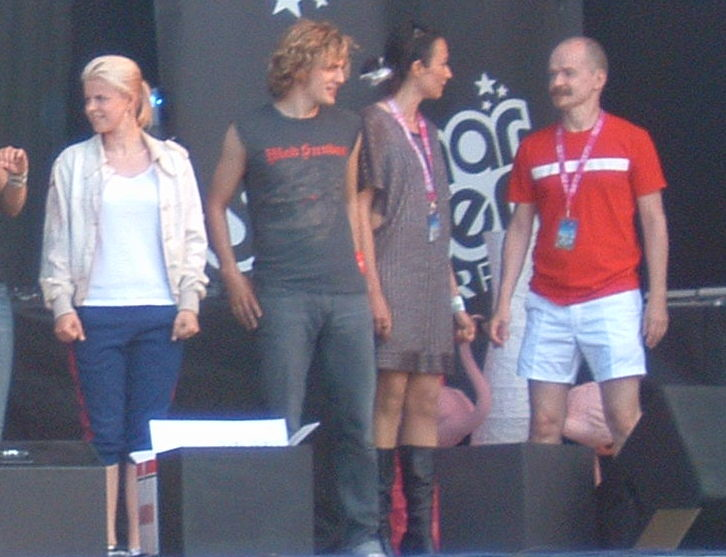
BWO (right) alongside Robyn (left) during a Swedish on-stage radio show, July 2005

== Chart and airplay success ==
=== 2004-2005: Prototype ===
BWO's debut single release was "Living in a Fantasy" in May 2004. This was only a moderate Number 44 hit in Sweden, and the style and production of the song differ somewhat from those of any BWO song released subsequently. Subsequent releases were more successful in Sweden, particularly third single "Sixteen Tons of Hardware" (Number 11) in February 2005. BWO's debut album Prototype, first released in Russia in November 2004, was released in Sweden in March 2005, reaching Number 2 in the album charts and attaining platinum status. Eventually no fewer than seven tracks from the album went on to be Swedish hit singles, with sixth single "Sunshine in the Rain" (Number 12) being another high point. Peter Ashraf.

"Sixteen Tons of Hardware" and "Voodoo Magic" were both hit singles in Finland. Two singles off the album, "Living in a Fantasy" and "Sixteen Tons of Hardware" went Number 1 in the Europa Plus Airplay Chart in Russia, and the album soon crossed over to neighboring countries, generating no less than five Top 5 hit singles in Ukraine and two Top 5 hit singles in Hungary. The track "Gone" was a Number 1 hit in Lebanon.

=== 2006: Halcyon Days ===
BWO's second album Halcyon Days, released in April 2006, entered the Swedish Album Chart at Number 1, shipping gold and generating four further hit singles, of which the first single "Temple of Love" was a Number 1 smash in Sweden and charted across Scandinavia and Eastern Europe.

Halcyon Days was followed by a remix collection called Halcyon Nights, released in December 2006.

=== 2007-2008: Fabricator ===
A third studio album, Fabricator, was released in Sweden on September 19, 2007, entering the Swedish charts at Number 6. A pre-release single "Save My Pride", was released in May 2007, becoming BWO's fourth Top 20 single in Sweden. It also went Number 1 on major Turkish radio station Radio Mydonese's Top 40 Countdown in July 2007. The singles "Let it Rain" and "Rhythm Drives Me Crazy" were released simultaneously in August 2007. "Rhythm Drives Me Crazy" was chosen as the theme for the Swedish team in the Women's Football World Cup in China in September 2007, and was a fourth Top 20 hit for BWO in Finland. A fourth single "The Destiny Of Love" was released in October 2007. A fifth, "Give Me the Night", was released at the end of December 2007, but became the only BWO single (as of August 2008) to fail to reach the Swedish singles chart.

=== 2008: Pandemonium - The Singles Collection ===
A "greatest hits" album called Pandemonium - The Singles Collection was released on April 9, 2008. It contained most of their previous singles plus 3 new songs. "Lay Your Love On Me", their entry for Melodifestivalen 2008, was the first single release, reaching Number 2 in the Swedish singles chart, plus their first Number 1 in the influential Sveriges Radio P3 Tracks chart. "Barcelona" was a less successful second single, but third single "The Bells of Freedom" became a sixth Top 20 single after a tie-in with Europride 2008 in Stockholm.

A DVD by the same name, containing all video clips, was released in the fall of 2008.

=== 2009: Big Science ===
Big Science is the fourth studio album of BWO and was released on April 1, 2009. It features 12 brand new songs, but the album has a total of 14 tracks (two remixes are included). The first single is "You're Not Alone", which was released as a ballad and as a disco version (like they did with Open Door). The ballad version also served as BWO's entry in the 2009 Melodifestivalen. "Right Here Right Now" is the second single and was released on May 27, 2009. The third single. "Rise To The Occasion" was released in Scandinavia in the fall.

On April 15, 2009, the band release their second compilation album Sunshine in the Rain – The Album, made specifically for Japanese market. It contains 15 songs and 3 remixes. The first single of this album is "Sunshine in the Rain" and the second single is "Lay Your Love on Me".

=== 2010: Band hiatus and future projects ===
In early 2010, BWO announced they were temporarily departing ways after an intensive career of five albums released in less than six years.

Alexander Bard joined the Universal Music-signed Gravitonas project led by former punk rock singer and producer Andreas Öhrn. In 2013 he also got reunited with the original line-up of Army Of Lovers to perform a new song called "Rockin' The Ride" in Melodifestivalen and the release of a new Greatest Hits, which also features a track with Gravitonas member Andreas Öhrn.

Martin Rolinski signed a solo contract with Universal Music and released his debut solo single "Blame It On a Decent Matter" in 2012, and took part in 2013 Melodifestivalen with the track "In and Out Of Love".

Marina Schiptjenko went on a Scandinavian tour and made an album with her reunited 1980s synthpop project Page. All three BWO members were adamant the split was amicable and would not prevent them from rather very likely future musical collaborations under both the BWO and other umbrellas.

=== In the United Kingdom ===
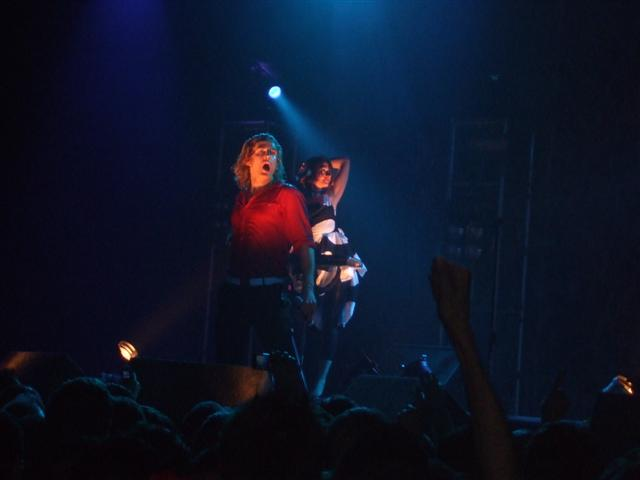
BWO performing at G-A-Y in London, July 2008

BWO are mainly well known and popular in the gay community (but not only) in the UK, due to the attention they receive via the gay media. Signed to small independent record label Shell Records in the UK, BWO have achieved moderate success with a few single releases. Initially two of their Swedish hit singles, "Sixteen Tons of Hardware" and "Chariots of Fire", reached the Top 10 of the British club charts. With a more concerted UK release including physical CD singles, the remixed 2005 single "Sunshine in the Rain" hit number 1 in the UK indie chart and reached Number 69 in the main UK singles chart in March 2008. "Lay Your Love On Me" was released in the UK in late July 2008, charted also at Number 69 in the main singles chart, and Number 2 in the UK indie charts. BWO's third physical single release in the UK was to be "Will My Arms Be Strong Enough", the single was released on 22 September 2008, and failed to make the top 100.

All three single releases by BWO have been playlisted by BBC Radio 2 "The UK's most popular radio station" and a few music TV channels. They have attracted more attention in gay media, and have twice appeared in the prestigious Saturday night slot at the G-A-Y nightclub in London. Both "Sunshine in the Rain" and "Lay Your Love On Me" can still be heard being played in New Look and H&M, two of the UK's most popular high street clothing retailers, throughout 2008 and 2009.

"Right Here Right Now" was released in 2009 and peaked at #19 in the UK Commercial Pop Charts Top40. The track has been remixed the UK market, with additional vocals from Swedish artist Velvet.

=== In the United States ===
BWO made their way to the USA with their singles "Lay Your Love On Me," "Chariots of Fire", "Temple of Love" and "The Destiny of Love" being played in the popular clothing store Abercrombie and Fitch during summer 2008, the holiday season in 2008 and into early 2009. In February 2009, "Sunshine In The Rain" was also featured on the Abercrombie and Fitch playlist. They were also on the Abercrombie and Fitch spring preview playlist for 2009/2010 with "Burning Down the House". BWO songs are still played in Abercrombie and Fitch and Hollister in 2012.

=== Melodifestivalen participation ===
BWO competed in the Swedish Melodifestivalen 2005 with the song "Gone", written by the band's co-producer Anders Hansson, but failed to qualify for the final, finishing fifth out of eight in one of the four semi-finals.

In 2006, they competed once again in Melodifestivalen with the song Temple Of Love, this time qualifying for the final at the Stockholm Globe Arena, where they finished second behind Carola. Temple Of Love went on to reach Number 1 in the Swedish singles chart, and has been assessed as the most internationally successful Melodifestivalen song from the 2006 competition.

During 2007 BWO stated in interviews that they had no intention of returning to Melodifestivalen, but might consider instead seeking to enter Eurovision for Martin Rolinski's homeland of Poland. However, there was a change of heart, and BWO entered Melodifestivalen for a third time in 2008 with a song called "Lay Your Love on Me". This was co-written by Bard and Hansson together with Bobby Ljunggren and Henrik Wikström, ironically the two composers who wrote Carola's winning song which beat BWO in 2006. Going into their semi-final as heavy bookmakers' favourites to qualify, the song duly progressed directly to the final, held at the Stockholm Globe Arena on 15 March 2008, where the song finished in third place behind winner Charlotte Perrelli and second-placed Sanna Nielsen.

In 2008, it was also rumoured that BWO were approached by the BBC to appear in Eurovision: Your Decision, the UK's version of Melodifestivalen, however BWO turned them down in favour of participating once again at Melodifestivalen. In August, they detailed their refusal to Digital Spy with the requirement of UK "second-rate" songwriters being a main stumbling block. "BWO were once offered the chance to compete to become the UK's entry, but we turned it down because they wouldn't let us write our own songs."

BWO entered Melodifestivalen once again in 2009 with their fourth studio album's first single, You're Not Alone, which was co-written by Bard and Hansson with Fredrik Kempe. The song did not qualify directly for Globen and was sent to 'Andra Chansen'. They did not go through in that round either.

=== Recognition ===
BWO won the prestigious Rockbjörnen award in both 2005 and 2006, voted Sweden's most popular band, all categories. In 2006 they received a Grammis Award for Sweden's most popular band of the year. BWO were nominated for four Grammis Awards in 2005 for the Prototype album and five Grammis Awards in 2006 for the Halcyon Days album. BWO were also nominated for dance act of the year in 2006 at the NRJ Scandinavian Awards in Helsinki and won the category for the most popular band.

== Discography ==
Bodies Without Organs discography
- Studio albums: 4
- Compilation albums: 2
- Singles: 23
- Video albums: 1
- Music videos: 18
- Remix albums: 1

=== Studio albums ===
Release	Album	Sweden Albums	Japan Albums	Sales/Certification	Additional information
March 9, 2005	Prototype	2	—	GLF: Platinum (January 2006)	First studio album
April 19, 2006	Halcyon Days	1	—	GLF: Gold (April 2006)	Second studio album
September 19, 2007	Fabricator	6	—		Third studio album
April 1, 2009	Big Science	9	—		Fourth studio album

=== Remix albums ===
Release	Album	Additional information
December 27, 2006	Halcyon Nights	It contains remixed versions of songs from the album Halcyon Days

=== Compilation albums ===
Release	Album	Sweden Albums	Japan Albums	UK Indie	Sales/Certification	Additional information
April 9, 2008	Pandemonium – The Singles Collection	3	—	24		
April 15, 2009	Sunshine in the Rain	—	—	—		

=== Singles ===
Year	Release	Song	Sweden Singles	Sweden Tracks	Finland Singles	Ukraine Singles	Russia Singles	UK Singles	UK Indie	Europe 100	US Dance	Japan Singles	Album
2004	May 7	"Living in a Fantasy"	44	20	-	1	2	-	-	30	-	-	Prototype
2004	September 24	"Conquering America"	27	15	-	2	16	-	-	35	-	-	Prototype
2005	February 3	"Sixteen Tons of Hardware"	11	14	8	1	10	-	-	28	-	-	Prototype
2005	March 31	"Gone"	40	16	-	-	-	-	-	-	-	-	Prototype
2005	May 12	"Open Door"	28	4	-	2	-	-	-	41	-	-	Prototype
2005	September 15	"Sunshine in the Rain"	12	6	-	-	-	69	1	-	-	26	Prototype
2005	December 10	"Voodoo Magic"	38	14	12	3	-	-	-	-	-	-	Prototype
2006	March 15	"Temple of Love"	1	2	-	-	-	-	-	-	-	-	Halcyon Days
2006	May 24	"We Could Be Heroes"	18	10	-	-	-	-	-	-	-	-	Halcyon Days
2006	September 13	"Will My Arms Be Strong Enough"	39	16	-	-	-	-	-	-	-	-	Halcyon Days
2006	November 22	"Chariots of Fire"	45	14	-	-	-	-	-	-	40	-	Halcyon Days
2007	May 7	"Save My Pride"	14	18	6	-	-	-	-	62	-	-	Fabricator
2007	August 22	"Let It Rain"	23	17	-	-	-	-	-	-	-	-	Fabricator
2007	August 22	"Rhythm Drives Me Crazy"	35	-	13	-	-	-	-	-	-	-	Fabricator
2007	October 17	"The Destiny of Love"	56	-	18	-	-	-	-	-	-	-	Fabricator
2007	December	"Give Me the Night"	-	-	-	-	-	-	-	-	-	-	Fabricator
2008	March 12	"Lay Your Love on Me"	2	1	-	-	-	69	2	91	-	44	Pandemonium – The Singles Collection
2008	May 28	"Barcelona"	56	-	-	-	-	-	-	-	-	-	Pandemonium – The Singles Collection
2008	July 21	"The Bells of Freedom"	15	-	-	-	-	-	-	-	-	-	Pandemonium – The Singles Collection
2008	October 8	"Gomenasai"	-	-	-	-	-	-	-	-	-	-	Pandemonium – The Singles Collection
2009	March 1	"You're Not Alone"	11	-	-	-	-	-	-	96	-	-	Big Science
2009	May 27	"Right Here Right Now"	28	-	-	-	-	-	-	-	8	-	Big Science
2009	August 31	"Right Here Right Now" (UK version) (feat. Velvet)	-	-	-	-	-	-	-	-	-	-	Big Science
2009	September 14	"Rise to the Occasion"	-	-	-	-	-	-	-	-	-	-	Big Science
2009	November 30	"Kings of Tomorrow"	-	-	-	-	-	-	-	-	-	-	Big Science

- The UK chart placing of "Sunshine in the Rain" was attained in March 2008, and that of "Lay Your Love on Me" in August 2008.
- The U.S. Billboard chart placing of "Chariots of Fire" was attained in December 2008 after promotional re-issue of the single in U.S. clubs.

== Videography ==
=== Music videos ===
Year	Video	Director
2004	"Living in a Fantasy"	Calle Stotz
2004	"Conquering America"	Fredrik Boklund
2005	"Sixteen Tons of Hardware"	Fredrik Boklund
2005	"Open Door"	Fredrik Boklund
2005	"Sunshine in the Rain"	Fredrik Boklund
2006	"Temple of Love"	Fredrik Boklund
2006	"We Could Be Heroes"	Fredrik Boklund
2006	"Will My Arms Be Strong Enough"	Fredrik Boklund
2006	"Chariots of Fire"	Kamisol
2007	"Save My Pride"	Kalle Haglund
2007	"Let It Rain"	Kamisol
2007	"The Destiny of Love"	Kalle Haglund
2007	"Give Me the Night"	Fredrik Boklund
2008	"Lay Your Love On Me"	Kamisol
2008	"Barcelona"	Mauricio Molnari
2008	"The Bells of Freedom"	Kamisol
2009	"You're Not Alone"	Kamisol
2009	"Right Here Right Now"	Kamisol
2009	"Rise to the Occasion"	Kamisol

=== DVD ===
Year	Title	Details	Format
2008	Pandemonium - The Video Collection	Compilation of music videos from 2004–2008	DVD
