= Love Kills =

Love Kills may refer to:

== Film ==
- Love Kills (film), a 1998 American crime thriller by Mario Van Peebles
- Sid and Nancy: Love Kills, a 1986 British biopic by Alex Cox
- Love Kills (1973 film), alternate name for the Italian gangster film Cry of a Prostitute

== Music ==
- Love Kills (band), a Canadian alternative rock band
- Love Kills!, a 2000 album by In Strict Confidence
- "Love Kills" (Freddie Mercury song), 1984
- "Love Kills" (Roberto Bellarosa song), 2013
- "Love Kills", a song by Joe Strummer from the soundtrack of the film Sid and Nancy: Love Kills
- "Love Kills", a song by Circle Jerks from the soundtrack of the film Sid and Nancy: Love Kills
- "Love Kills", a song by The Ramones from their 1986 album Animal Boy
- "Love Kills", a song by Robyn from her 2010 album Body Talk Pt. 2
