= Give Me the Night =

Give Me the Night may refer to:

- Give Me the Night (album), by George Benson, 1980
- "Give Me the Night" (song), by George Benson, 1980
- "Give Me the Night", a song by BWO from Fabricator
- "Give Me the Night", a song by DragonForce from The Power Within
