= SMPJ =

SMPJ may refer to:

- Super Mario Party Jamboree, a 2024 video game released for the Nintendo Switch
- Swedish Muslims for Peace and Justice, a peace organization
- Sista Mannen På Jorden, a Swedish snythpop band
