= Prototype (Bodies Without Organs album) =

Studio album by BWO
- Released: November 2004 (Russia); 9 March 2005 (Sweden)
- Genre: Pop
- Length: 57:39
- Label: Capital, EMI
- Producer: Alexander Bard, Anders Hansson

BWO chronology
Prototype (2004)	Halcyon Days (2006)

Singles from Prototype
- 1. "Living in a Fantasy" Released: 2004; 2. "Conquering America" Released: 2004; 3. "Sixteen Tons of Hardware" Released: 2005; 4. "Gone" Released: 2005; 5. "Open Door" Released: 2005; 6. "Sunshine in the Rain" Released: 2005; 7. "Voodoo Magic" Released: 2005

Prototype is the debut studio album by BWO. It was released in Russia in November 2004, and in Sweden on March 9, 2005. It peaked at number 2 on the Swedish Albums Chart.

== Track listing ==
No.	Title	Length
1.	"Sixteen Tons of Hardware"	3:29
2.	"Conquering America"	3:21
3.	"Son of a Gun"	3:26
4.	"Open Door (Ballad Version)"	3:30
5.	"Walking the Night"	3:51
6.	"Voodoo Magic"	3:42
7.	"Sunshine in the Rain"	4:02
8.	"Riding Through the Night"	3:51
9.	"Say I Love You"	4:21
10.	"Rhythm Divine"	3:38
11.	"European Psycho"	3:40
12.	"Living in a Fantasy"	3:57
13.	"Gone"	2:58
14.	"Open Door (Disco Version)"	3:41
15.	"Sixteen Tons of Hardware (Johan S Remix)"	3:27
16.	"Conquering America (Johan S Remix)"	3:15

== Charts ==
Chart	Peak position
Swedish Albums (Sverigetopplistan)	2
