= Exile Paradise =

Studio album by In Strict Confidence
- Released: May 2006 (EU); June 2006 (US)
- Recorded: Maschinenraum
- Genre: Electronic music
- Length: 1:02:58
- Label: Minuswelt Musikfabrik (EU), Metropolis Records (US), Hellion Records (BR), Irond (RU)

In Strict Confidence chronology
Holy (2004)	Exile Paradise (2006)	La Parade Monstrueuse (2010)

Professional ratings
Review scores
Source	Rating
AllMusic	3.5/5 stars

Exile Paradise is In Strict Confidence's sixth studio album.

The album is sold as both two CDs and a DVD; and as a single CD (disc one).

The opening and closing tracks on disc one, "The Harder They Come…" and "…The Harder They Fall" are short instrumental tracks of a similar style.

== Track listing ==
All lyrics are written by In Strict Confidence, except where noted; all music is composed by In Strict Confidence.

Disc One
No.	Title	Length
1.	"The Harder They Come…" (Voice – Sina Hübner)	1:19
2.	"Promised Land"	5:40
3.	"Forbidden Fruit"	4:14
4.	"Fading Light"	6:01
5.	"Wintermoon"	5:07
6.	"Manchmal Redest Du Im Schlaf" (Backing Vocals – Andy Krüger)	6:18
7.	"Regicide"	5:20
8.	"Der Teufel"	6:06
9.	"Away From Here" (Backing Vocals – Andy Krüger)	5:38
10.	"In Favilla"	7:59
11.	"Something To Remember"	5:54
12.	"...The Harder They Fall" (Voice – Sina Hübner)	3:16
Total length:		1:02:58

Disc Two
No.	Title	Length
1.	"Samael"	4:14
2.	"A Single Touch"	6:14
3.	"Blind Spot"	3:36
Total length:		14:04

Disc Three (CD-ROM)
No.	Title	Length
1.	"Miss Your Voice"	4:29
2.	"Forbidden Fruit (Video)"	4:14
Total length:		8:43

Disc three also contained:

1. Remix kits "Promised Land" & "Forbidden Fruit"
2. Desktop wallpapers
3. Link section
