= Utopia (In Strict Confidence album) =

Studio album by In Strict Confidence
- Released: October 9, 2012
- Genre: Electronic music
- Length: 51:32
- Label: Golden Core (ZYX)

In Strict Confidence chronology
La Parade Monstrueuse (2010)	Utopia (2012)	The Hardest Heart (2016)

Utopia is In Strict Confidence's eighth studio album.

== Track listing ==
All lyrics are written by In Strict Confidence, except where noted; all music is composed by In Strict Confidence.

No.	Title	Length
1.	"Morpheus"	5:50
2.	"Tiefer"	4:29
3.	"Justice"	4:38
4.	"Forever And More" (Lyrics By, Co-Written-By – Chris Buseck)	4:35
5.	"Archangel"	3:52
6.	"Irgendwo Im Nirgendwo"	5:30
7.	"Being Born"	4:19
8.	"Karasevdah"	3:12
9.	"Silver Tongues"	4:40
10.	"Silver Bells"	5:04
11.	"She Came With Knives"	5:24
Total length:		51:32

== Singles and EPs ==
- Morpheus
- Tiefer
- Justice
