= I Breathe =

1996 single by Vacuum

Single by Vacuum

from the album The Plutonium Cathedral
- Released: 1996
- Length: 4:37 (album edit); 3:55 (radio edit)
- Label: Stockholm
- Songwriter(s): Alexander Bard, Anders Wollbeck
- Producer(s): Alexander Bard, Anders Wollbeck, Anders Hansson, Jacob Schulze

Vacuum singles chronology
"I Breathe" (1996)	"Science of the Sacred" (1997)

"I Breathe" is a song by Swedish pop band Vacuum. The track was written by Alexander Bard and Anders Wollbeck, who co-produced the song with Anders Hansson and Jacob Schulze. It was released in 1996 as the band's debut single and peaked at number two in Sweden, becoming Vacuum's highest-charting single in their home country as well as their only top-40 hit. The song also experienced airplay success in Italy, where it peaked at number four on Music & Media's Italian airplay chart.

== Charts ==
=== Weekly charts ===
Chart (1997)	Peak position
Italy Airplay (Music & Media)	4
Sweden (Sverigetopplistan)	2

=== Year-end charts ===
Chart (1996)	Position
Sweden (Topplistan)	54

Chart (1997)	Position
Sweden (Topplistan)	32

== Certifications ==
Region	Certification	Certified units/sales
Sweden (GLF)	Gold	15,000^{^}
^{^} Shipments figures based on certification alone.
