= La Parade Monstrueuse =

Studio album by In Strict Confidence
- Released: February 26, 2010
- Genre: Electronic music
- Length: 49:35
- Label: Minuswelt, Metropolis Records

In Strict Confidence chronology
Exile Paradise (2006)	La Parade Monstrueuse (2010)	Utopia (2012)

Professional ratings
Review scores
Source	Rating
alternation	85

La Parade Monstrueuse is In Strict Confidence's seventh studio album.

== Track listing ==
All lyrics are written by In Strict Confidence; all music is composed by In Strict Confidence

No.	Title	Length
1.	"La Parade Monstrueuse"	1:00
2.	"My Despair"	5:01
3.	"Silver Bullets"	4:19
4.	"One Drop"	5:26
5.	"Set Me Free"	4:31
6.	"This is All"	3:50
7.	"Ewige Nacht"	4:49
8.	"SnowWhite"	5:14
9.	"I Surrender"	4:54
10.	"Schwarzes Licht"	4:54
11.	"Golden Gate"	5:37
Total length:		49:35

== EPs ==
- My Despair
- Silver Bullets
- Set Me Free
