= Mne ne nuzhna informatsiya =

Mne Ne Nuzhna Informatsiya

Remix album by Technology
- Released: 1992
- Recorded: 1990–1992
- Genres: New wave, electronic, synthpop
- Length: 57:21
- Language: Russian
- Labels: RiTonis (1992); JAM Group International (2003)
- Producer: Leonid Velichkovsky

Technology compilations chronology
Mne Ne Nuzhna Informatsiya (1992)	Remiksy (1998)

Mne Ne Nuzhna Informatsiya (Russian: Мне Не Нужна Информация, meaning "I Don't Need The Information") is a 1992 remix album by Technology. It features re-recorded versions of a selection of songs which had originally appeared on the album Vsyo, chto ty khochesh.

== Track listing ==
=== Mne Ne Nuzhna Informatsiya ===
- SK05-35 – Cassette edition
1. "Polchasa" (Half an hour) [New Mix/Gala Mix]
2. "Informatsiya" (Information) [new track!]
3. "Shutnik" (Jester) [Mega mix]
4. "Pesni Ni O Chyom" (Songs about nothing) [House Mix]
5. "Segodnya Nochyu" (Today at night) [new track!]
6. "Vsyo, Chto Ty Khochesh" (All that you want) [Beg Mix/Next Mix]
7. "Kholodny Sled" (Cold trail) [Metal Mix]
8. "Shutnik" (Jester) [Sympho Mis/House Mix]

=== Mne Ne Nuzhna Informatsiya(re-release 2003) ===
- 010 254-2 – CD edition

No.	Title	Writer(s)	Length
1.	"Pesni Ni O Chyom (Songs about nothing) [House Mix]"	R.Ryabtsev	7:28
2.	"Shutnik (Jester) [Sympho Mis/House Mix]"	L.Velichkovsky, R.Ryabtsev	6:19
3.	"Informatsiya (Information) [cover on Nochnoy Prospekt]"	I.Sokolovsky	4:35
4.	"Kholodny Sled (Cold trail) [16"Mix]"	L.Velichkovsky, R.Ryabtsev	4:32
5.	"Shutnik (Jester) [Mega Mix]"	L.Velichkovsky, R.Ryabtsev	6:22
6.	"Polchasa (Halt an hour) [New Mix/Gala Mix]"	R.Ryabtsev	4:52
7.	"Vsyo, Chto Ty Khochesh (All that you want) [Beg Mix/Next Mix]"	L.Velichkovsky, R.Ryabtsev	6:38
8.	"Discoteki (Discotheque) [bonus track]"	I.Sokolovsky	3:59
9.	"Idi So Mnoy (Go with me) [bonus track]"	V.Nechitaylo	4:02
10.	"Najmi Na Knopku (Click on the button) [Show Mix/New Mix]"	R.Ryabtsev	6:01
11.	"Kholodny Sled (Cold trail) [Metal Mix]"	L.Velichkovsky, R.Ryabtsev	4:32
