= Pandemonium – The Singles Collection =

2008 compilation album by Bodies Without Organs

Pandemonium - The Singles Collection

Compilation album by BWO
- Released: April 9, 2008
- Recorded: 2004–2008
- Genre: Pop, synthpop
- Label: Capital; EMI
- Producer: Alexander Bard, Anders Hansson

BWO chronology
Fabricator (2007)	Pandemonium - The Singles Collection (2008)	Big Science (2009)

Singles from Pandemonium
- 1. "Lay Your Love on Me" Released: March 2008; 2. "Barcelona" Released: May 2008; 3. "The Bells of Freedom" Released: August 2008

Professional ratings
Review scores
Source	Rating
BBC	(Mixed)
Pink Paper	4/5 stars

Pandemonium - The Singles Collection

Video by BWO
- Released: 2008
- Genre: Music DVD
- Label: Capital; EMI

Pandemonium – The Singles Collection is a greatest hits record by Swedish band BWO. It contains the hits from their three studio albums, and three new songs:

- Lay Your Love on Me, the band's 2008 entry in the Swedish pre-selection for Eurovision, Melodifestivalen
- Barcelona
- The Bells of Freedom, used as the theme song of the 2008 Europride; its video features Alexander's former band, Army of Lovers

A DVD of the same name, containing all 16 video clips and 2 remix videos, was released in Sweden on October 8, 2008.

== Track listing ==
1. The Bells of Freedom (3:25)
2. Lay Your Love on Me (2:59)
3. Barcelona (3:45)
4. Sunshine in the Rain (3:30)
5. Give Me the Night (3:09)
6. Chariots of Fire (4:09)
7. Open Door (3:29)
8. Gomenasai (3:27)
9. Sixteen Tons of Hardware (3:30)
10. Will My Arms Be Strong Enough (4:16)
11. We Should Be Dancing (3:34)
12. Temple of Love (3:25)
13. Living in a Fantasy (3:39)
14. We Could Be Heroes (4:24)
15. Voodoo Magic (3:41)
16. Let It Rain (3:30)
17. Conquering America (3:20)
18. The Destiny of Love (3:50)

== Charts ==
Chart performance for Pandemonium – The Singles Collection
Chart (2008)	Peak position
Swedish Albums (Sverigetopplistan)	3
UK Independent Albums (OCC)	24
