= Elegant Machinery =

Swedish synth-pop band

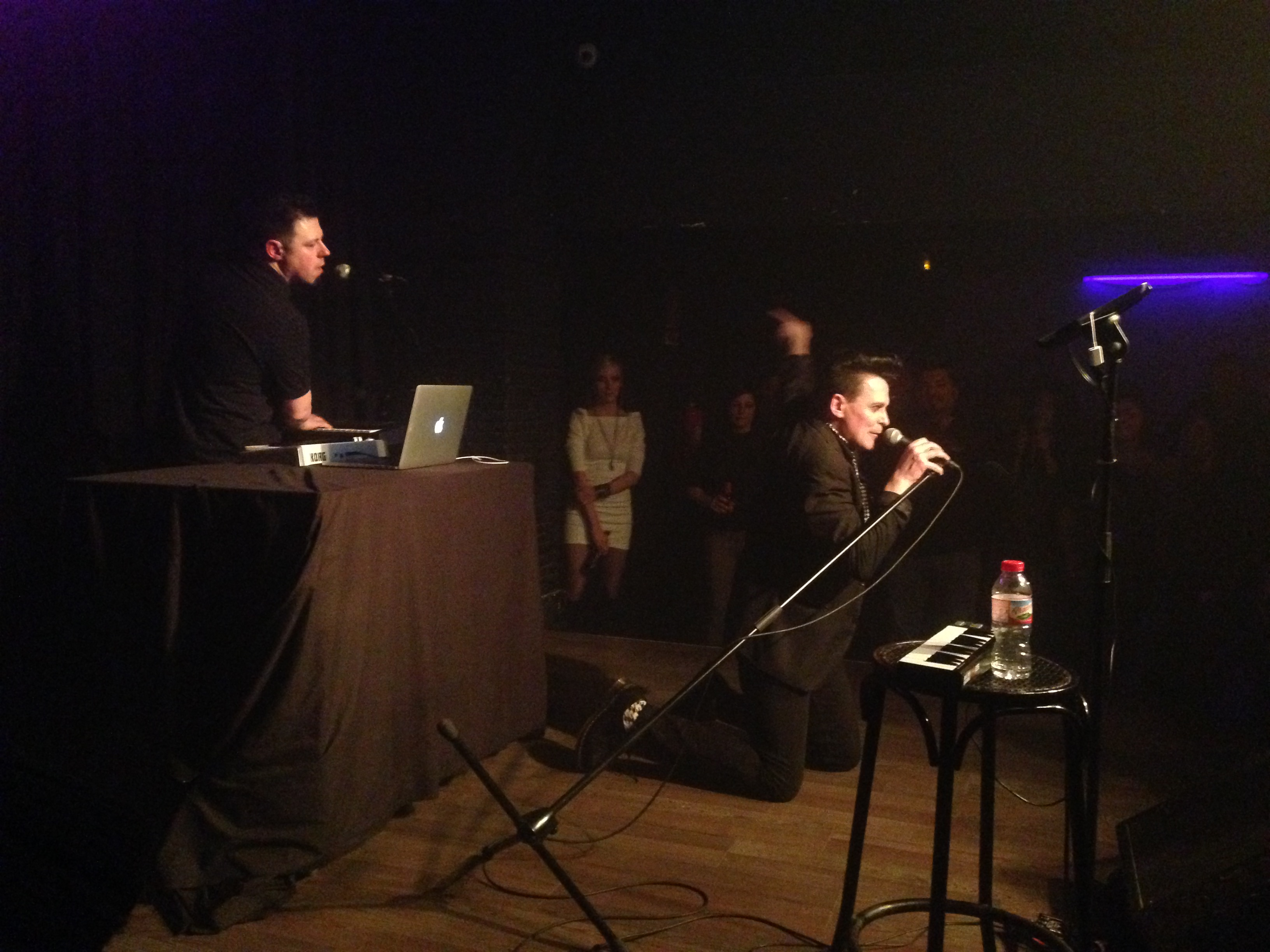
- In concert at "Sala Zero", Tarragona, in January 2016

Background information
- Origin: Sweden
- Genres: Synth-pop; Electropop
- Years active: 1988–1999, 2004–2011, 2016-Present
- Labels: Energy Rekords, A Different Drum, Contrasena
- Members: Robert Enforsen; Johan Malmgren
- Past members: Richard Jomshof; Leslie Bayne; Jonas Kröjtz; Jimmy Machon; Thomas Gaarn
- Website: elegantMACHINERY.se

Elegant Machinery is a Swedish synth-pop band. With a sound compared to early Depeche Mode, OMD, the Human League, Yazoo and Soft Cell, they are one of few recent bands dedicated to making traditional synth-pop music. Along with such bands as Page, S.P.O.C.K, Sista Mannen På Jorden and Kiethevez they define the sound of the Swedish synth-pop movement.

Robert Enforsen, Richard Jomshof and Leslie Bayne started the band in 1988 under the name Pole Position. Their released their first demo in 1989, at which point they changed their name to Elegant Machinery, derived from the title of an album by the group DATA.

Due to Leslie Bayne's stagefright, Johan Malmgren joined the band as a tour musician in 1992. He later became a permanent member.

The band was very successful in Sweden, with a number of successful singles and various awards. In the rest of Europe, their biggest break into the mainstream was with the single Process, which reached number 5 in the Spanish charts.

== Breakup, reunion, breakup and reunion ==
Elegant Machinery disbanded in 1999.

In 2001, the band temporarily reunited (with Johan temporarily replaced by Jarmo Ollila of Daily Planet) for their first-ever American appearance, followed by a performance in Mexico. Over the next few years, the band performed a number of times in Europe.

In October 2004, after a successful gig at Romo Night in Gothenburg, the band decided to work on new music. Johan, Richard, and Robert have been joined by original member Leslie Bayne.

In November 2007, it was announced that the band had signed with German label Out of Line. A new single "Feel the Silence" was released in January. The current line-up consists of Robert Enforsen, Richard Jomshof and Leslie Bayne.

In early April 2011, there were rumours that the band had split once again. This was later confirmed by the group's management. Jomshof denied the rumours that the split had anything to do with his political career with the Sweden Democrats and cited other personal differences as reasons for the breakup.

In 2016, Robert Enforsen and Leslie Bayne reformed Elegant Machinery with new part-time member Jonas Kröjtz. They released a new EP on October 14, 2016, entitled, "I"

Since 2019 Elegant Machinery has consisted of Robert Enforsen and Johan Malmgren. Leslie Bayne left the band in March 2023. A new album is currently taking shape.

== Side projects ==
During the band's hiatus, Robert Enforsen worked on a number of side projects, including Enforce, Hype, Gobble & Gag, and Red Light District. Meanwhile, Johan Malmgren joined the Swedish band S.P.O.C.K as a keyboardist, programmer and composer. Johan and Robert also produced the debut album "Lost in a Maze" of the Swedish-British band Univaque in 2004.

== Discography ==
=== Albums ===
- Degraded Faces (1991)
- Shattered Grounds (1993)
- Yesterday Man (1996)
- A Soft Exchange (2008)

=== Singles / EPs ===
- Safety in Mind (1990)
- Process (1992)
- Hard to Handle (1993)
- Repressive Thoughts (1994)
- Watching You (1995)
- Myself With You (1996)
- Fading Away (1998)
- Words of Wisdom (1998)
- Feel the Silence (2008)
- Move (2008)
- Brave new world (with Technology featuring Robert Enforsen) (2009)
- EP I (2016)

=== Compilations ===
- A Decade of Thoughts (1998)

=== DVDs ===
- Archives (2005)
