= Sunshine in the Rain =

Single by BWO

from the album Prototype
- Released: 15 September 2005
- Recorded: 2004
- Genre: Electronica; pop
- Length: 3:32
- Label: Capitol; EMI
- Songwriters: Alexander Bard, Anders Hansson,
- Producer: 2N Productions

BWO singles chronology
"Open Door" (2005)	"Sunshine in the Rain" (2005)	"Voodoo Magic" (2005)

Music video
- "Sunshine in the Rain" (Official Video) on YouTube

"Sunshine in the Rain" is an electronica song performed by Swedish band BWO. The song was released as a sixth single from their first album, Prototype in Sweden, on 15 September 2005.

The single peaked at number 12 on the Swedish single chart. The song also became a Svensktoppen hit, charting for 26 weeks between the period 13 November 2005–7 May 2006, even topping the chart before leaving it. The song also reached at Trackslistan. ' The song was covered by Taiwanese pop singer Jolin Tsai under the title "Sun Will Never Set" for the 2007 album Agent J. Jolin's version in the key of C♯ major contrasts with the original in A♭ major.

== Charts ==
Chart (2005–2006)	Peak position
Romania (Romanian Top 100)	13
Sweden (Sverigetopplistan)	12

Chart (2008)	Peak position
UK Singles (OCC)	69
UK Indie (OCC)	1
UK Physical Singles (OCC)	15
