= Big Science (BWO album) =

Studio album by BWO
- Released: April 1, 2009
- Genre: Pop
- Length: 49:35
- Label: Bonnier Music
- Producer: Alexander Bard, Anders Hansson

BWO chronology
Pandemonium – The Singles Collection (2008)	Big Science (2009)	Sunshine in the Rain – The Album (2009)

Singles from Big Science
- 1. "You're Not Alone" Released: 2009; 2. "Right Here Right Now" Released: 2009; 3. "Rise to the Occasion" Released: 2009; 4. "Kings of Tomorrow" Released: 2009

Big Science is the fourth studio album by BWO. It was released on April 1, 2009. It peaked at number 9 on the Swedish Albums Chart.

== Release ==
In the UK, the album was released on October 5, 2009.

The album was promoted with "Right Here Right Now", the second single released on May 27, 2009, and "Rise to the Occasion", the first single released on September 14, 2009. Both releases are for Sweden, Norway, Finland and Denmark.

"Right Here Right Now" was released in the United Kingdom on December 7, 2009 (originally August) with added vocals from Velvet remixed by Cahill. However, this date has once again been pushed back and the release date is now 21 December. It has left many UK fans wondering if the track will ever be released. As of 2011, "Right Here Right Now" has not been released in the UK.

== Track listing ==
No.	Title	Length
1.	"Right Here Right Now"	3:41
2.	"Love Came Crashing Down"	3:28
3.	"Kings of Tomorrow (Ballad Version)"	3:47
4.	"Burning Down the House"	3:48
5.	"Rise to the Occasion"	3:26
6.	"You're Not Alone (Ballad Version)"	3:03
7.	"Bite The Bullet"	3:20
8.	"In Too Deep"	4:05
9.	"Thunderbolt"	3:25
10.	"Rhythm of the Night"	3:36
11.	"Singing in My Car"	3:37
12.	"Shoot from the Heart"	3:34
13.	"Kings of Tomorrow (Disco Version)"	3:45
14.	"You're Not Alone (Disco Version)"	3:04

== Charts ==
Chart	Peak position
Swedish Albums (Sverigetopplistan)	9
