= Mistrust the Angels =

Studio album by In Strict Confidence
- Released: June 3, 2002 (DE) September 10, 2002 (US)
- Genre: Electronic music
- Length: 1:13:26
- Label: Minuswelt Musikfabrik, Metropolis Records

In Strict Confidence chronology
| Love Kills! (2000) | Mistrust the Angels (2002) | Holy (2004) |

Professional ratings
Review scores
| Source | Rating |
|---|---|
| AllMusic | 4/5 stars |

Mistrust the Angels is In Strict Confidence's fourth studio album. The album reached #87 on the German national charts.

== Track listing ==
All lyrics are written by In Strict Confidence; all music is composed by In Strict Confidence

| No. | Title | Length |
|---|---|---|
| 0. | "Les Miroirs" (This is a hidden track prior to track 1) | 10:17 |
| 1. | "Send a Sign" | 5:42 |
| 2. | "Herzattacke" | 6:56 |
| 3. | "Au Milieu Des Anges" | 6:58 |
| 4. | "Engelsstaub" | 4:52 |
| 5. | "When the Heart Starts To Bleed" | 5:56 |
| 6. | "Schlecht Geträumt" | 4:56 |
| 7. | "Horizont" | 6:00 |
| 8. | "Lost in the Night" | 6:05 |
| 9. | "It Seems Lost…" | 0:05 |
| 10. | "Der Vampir Und Dessen Verwandlung" | 6:55 |
| 11. | "Der Tag An Dem Es Frösche Regnet" | 3:36 |
| 12. | "The Prayers of the Mute" | 5:08 |
| Total length: | | 1:13:26 |

== Singles ==
- Herzattacke
- When the Heart Starts to Bleed
- Engelsstaub
