= Tim Dowling =

American journalist and author

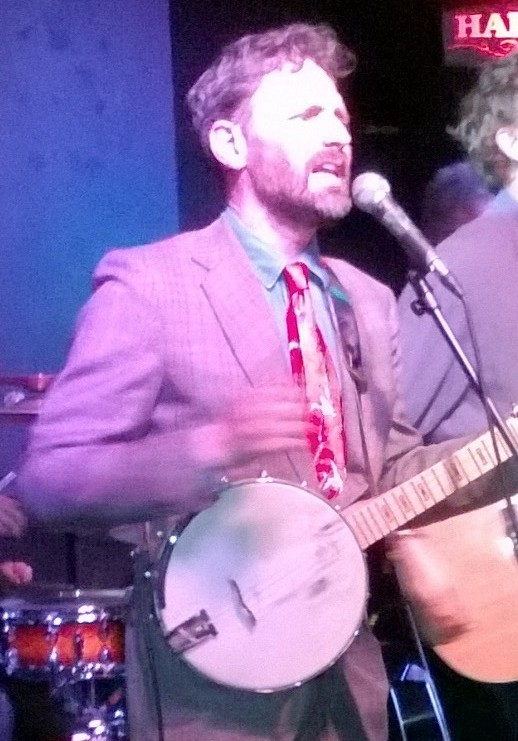
- Dowling playing the banjo in the band Police Dog Hogan
- Born: Robert Timothy Dowling; June 1963; Connecticut, US
- Occupation: Journalist
- Known for: Writing

Robert Timothy Dowling (/ˈdaʊlɪŋ/; born June 1963) is an American journalist and author who writes a weekly column in The Guardian about his life with his family in London.

== Career ==
Dowling worked in data entry for a films database before he became a freelance journalist, first working for GQ, then women's magazines and the Independent on Sunday. He is a columnist for The Guardian and has a weekly column in the paper's Saturday magazine, Weekend. His column replaced Jon Ronson's in 2007. He writes observational columns, often about his wife. Sam Leith of The Guardian noted that "Dowling's a very fresh and smart writer, as he needs to be. Stories about machete massacres or ebola pandemics pretty much write themselves: writing about nothing much, week in, week out, is the real test." Dowling also worked as a cartoonist for a short time.

Dowling's books include a 2001 book about the inventor of the disposable razor, King Camp Gillette, Suspicious Packages and Extendable Arms, a collection of his writing from The Guardian, and The Giles Wareing Haters' Club, his 2007 debut novel concerning a journalist Googling himself (narcissurfing) who finds an online club of people who hate him, inspired by Dowling searching for his name online. Giles Wareing was reviewed by TLS. Metro said it is "a fine comedy of domestic triviality".

Dowling said of his 2014 book How to Be a Husband: "It got quite a bit of publicity in the U.K. when it came out and [my wife] wasn't prepared for all that." Tom Hodgkinson writing in The Spectator called this book "a rare delight". Leith in The Guardian said there is "pleasure and treasure here." David Evans wrote in The Independent: "It's a rare thing to be able to write about life as a husband and father in such a way as to elicit nods of recognition among those who are neither of those things; Dowling does it with panache."

=== Published work ===
- Inventor of the Disposable Culture: King Camp Gillette 1855–1932 (Faber & Faber, 2001, ISBN 978-0571208104)
- Not the Archer prison diary (Ebury Press, 2002, ISBN 0091892392
- Suspicious Packages & Extendable Arms (Guardian Newspapers Ltd, 2007, ISBN 0-85265-087-6)
- The Giles Wareing Haters' Club (Picador, 2008, ISBN 0-330-44617-7)
- How to Be a Husband (Fourth Estate, 2014, ISBN 978-0-00-752766-3)
- Dad You Suck (Fourth Estate, 2017, ISBN 978-0-00-752769-4)
- How To Be Happy All The Time: The Unexpected Joys of Being A Cynic (Everything Bad is Good for You Book 2) (Hodder & Stoughton, 2019, ISBN 978-1-52-934500-1)

== Personal life ==
Dowling was born in Connecticut. His mother was a schoolteacher, his father was a dentist, and he has a brother and two sisters. He moved to the UK from New York at the age of 27 and currently lives in London with his wife Sophie de Brandt and their three sons. Dowling has played banjo (which his wife bought for his birthday) in the band Police Dog Hogan since 2009, and he writes about their festival gigs, including Glastonbury, in his column.
