= Energy Rekords =

Swedish record label

- Founded: 1990
- Founder: Håkan Ehrnst
- Status: Active
- Distributor(s): Border; Audioglobe; Hot Stuff
- Genre: Electronic
- Country of origin: Sweden

Energy Rekords is a record label formed in 1990 by the merging of the three labels: Front Music Production, Electronic Beat Association, and Energy - all small labels run from the Swedish town of Älmhult. By banding together these labels' founders Håkan Ehrnst, Krister Svensson and Per Faeltenborg formed a foundation for the Swedish electronic music in the 1990s by signing up new emerging artists like S.P.O.C.K and Daily Planet as well as veterans such as Page, Blue for Two, and Oil in the Eye from the UK.

During the first half of the 1990s, the label was considered to be the leading Swedish alternative electronic music label and hosted the annual Virtual X-mas party at Mejeriet in Lund, Sweden for many years. In 1995, Energy Rekords opened up two sub labels targeted towards different markets; the "Beat That!" label for indie pop/rock and the Cascade label for techno/dance style music.

In 1998, Energy Rekords merged with October Records and added that label's bands to its roster.

== Roster ==
- Brave New World
- Cat Rapes Dog
- Children Within
- Das Ich
- Die Krupps
- Diskodiktator
- Elegant Machinery
- EnCounter
- Forbidden Colours
- Front 242
- Front Line Assembly
- In Strict Confidence
- Iris
- Heavy Water Factory
- Kiethevez
- LCD
- Oil in the Eye
- Peter Bjorn and John
- Pouppée Fabrikk
- Project-X
- Proxy
- Rational Youth
- Robert Marlow
- Scapa Flow
- Sista Mannen På Jorden
- Slagsmålsklubben
- S.P.O.C.K
- The Nine
- VNV Nation
- Welle: Erdball

== See also ==
- List of record labels
- Deep Shag Records
