= Sista Mannen På Jorden =

Swedish synthpop band

- Origin: Sweden
- Genres: Synthpop
- Years active: 1986–present
- Labels: Energy Rekords; SubSpace Communications
- Members: Eddie Bengtsson (1986–); Christer Hermodsson (2005–)
- Past members: Matts Wiberg (1986–2004)
- Website: www.synthpop.se/smpj

Sista Mannen På Jorden (meaning "Last Man on Earth") or SMPJ is a Swedish synthpop group formed in 1986 by Eddie Bengtsson and Matts Wiberg. In 2004, Wiberg left the band and was replaced by Christer Hermodsson of S.P.O.C.K in 2005.

== Background ==
SMPJ was founded in the spring of 1986 by Bengtsson and Wiberg as a reaction against the direction of electronic music at the time; the band traces its influences to artists such as OMD, John Foxx, Yellow Magic Orchestra, and the late 1970s space disco bands such as Cerrone and Ganymed. The duo started working out of Bengtsson's home studio but would not release their first album until 1998 due to Bengtsson's somewhat better-known projects like S.P.O.C.K and Page.

The band's first album, Först i rymden (First in Space), saw a limited release of 500 copies on March 30, 1998 and quickly sold out, prompting the release of a second album, Ligger tyst ett tag med.

== Discography ==
- Först i rymden (1998)
- Ligger tyst ett tag med (1998)
- Luft (2000)
- Ok, Ok, Ok (2001)
- Lost tapes, Paleontologi (2004)
- Tredje Våningen (2007)
