= Technology (band) =

- Origin: Moscow, USSR-Russia
- Genres: Synthpop, alternative dance, new wave
- Years active: 1990–present
- Labels: JAM Records, POPmarket
- Website: www.tehnologia.info

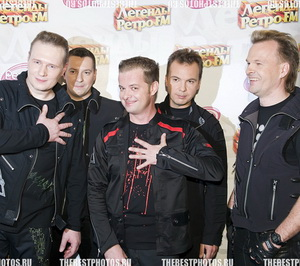
Technology, 2009

Technology (Russian: Технология) is a Soviet-Russian synthpop band formed in 1990 by Leonid Velichkovsky, Andrey Kokhaev, and Roman Ryabtsev, former members of the band Bioconstructor (Russian: Биоконструктор).

== Style and fashion ==
The image and sound of the group in the early 1990s: "leather jackets, hairstyles, monochrome synthetics, an impassive romantic voice", led to comparison of Technology with the British band Depeche Mode, which were popular in the USSR.

== Members ==
- Vladimir Nechitaylo – vocals, keyboards at concerts
- Roman Ryabtsev – vocals, guitar, keyboards, music, lyrics, arrangement
- Matvey Yudov – keyboards, backing vocals, music, arrangement

== Discography ==
=== Studio albums ===
- 1991: Vsyo, chto ty khochesh (All that you want)
- 1993: Rano ili Pozdno (Sooner or later)
- 1996: Eto Voyna (This is a War)
- 2009: Nositel Idey (The Carrier of Ideas)

=== Compilations and remixes ===
- 1992: Mne ne nuzhna informatsiya (I don't need the information)
- 1998: Remiksy (Technology. Remixes)
- 2001: Luchshie pesni (Technology. Best Songs)
- 2004: Legendarnye pesni (Technology. Legendary songs)

=== Singles ===
Year	Title	Album
2006	"Dayte Ognya"(Let the Fire)	Nositel Idey (The Carrier of Ideas)
2007	"Kamni"(Stones)	Nositel Idey (The Carrier of Ideas)
2009	"Lateks"(Latex)	Nositel Idey (The Carrier of Ideas)
2009	"Divny Novy Mir"(Brave New World)	Nositel Idey (The Carrier of Ideas)
2009	"Brave New World" feat. "Elegant Machinery" (English version)	Nositel Idey (The Carrier of Ideas)
2011	"Nachalnik Vselennoy"(Head of the Universe)	

=== Music videos ===
Year	Title	Album
1991	"Press the Button" (Nazhmi Na Knopku)	All That You Want (Vsyo, Chto Ty Hochesh)
1991	"Strange Dances" (Strannye Tantsy)	All That You Want (Vsyo, Chto Ty Hochesh)
1991	"Cold Trail" (Kholodnyy sled)	All That You Want (Vsyo, Chto Ty Hochesh)
1991	"Songs About Nothing" (Pesni Ne O Chyom)	All That You Want (Vsyo, Chto Ty Hochesh)
1991	"Jester" (Shutnik)	All That You Want (Vsyo, Chto Ty Hochesh)
1992	"Strange Dances" (Strannye Tantsy) (alternative version)	All That You Want (Vsyo, Chto Ty Hochesh)
2009	"Brave New World"	The Carrier of Ideas (Nositel Idey)
