= Police Dog Hogan =

British band

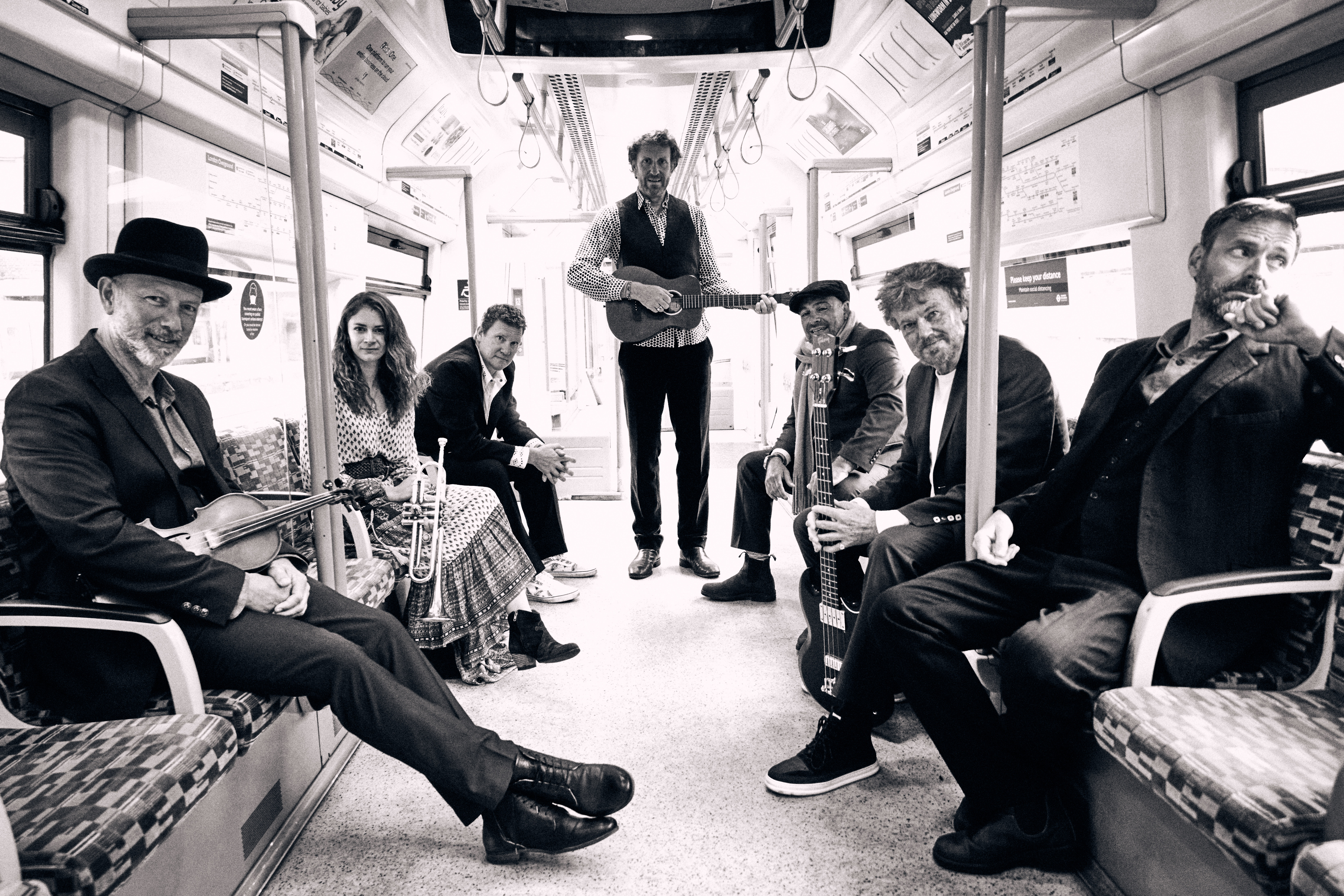
- Promotional shot for their album "Overground" 2022

Background information
- Origin: London, England
- Genres: Country, folk, bluegrass
- Years active: 2008–present
- Members: James Studholme; Eddie Bishop; Tim Dowling; Don Bowen; Alistair Hamer; Shahen Galichian; Emily Norris
- Past members: Pete Robinson; Adam Bennette; Tim Jepson; Michael Giri

Police Dog Hogan are a British band whose music combines elements of country, rock, bluegrass, and Americana. The band have been active since 2008 and released six albums and three EPs.

== History ==
The band was formed by vocalist James Studholme and fiddle player Eddie Bishop, who were joined by mandolin player Tim Jepson and guitarist Pete Robinson for the band's first gig. By the time of the band's first recording session in 2009, drummer Michael Giri, formerly of The Lilac Time, and banjo player Tim Dowling had been added to the line-up. The seventh member to join was bass guitarist Adam Bennette. Robinson and Bennette left the band after the recording of the Westward Ho! album. Bennette was replaced by Don Bowen (bass), and trumpeter Emily Norris also joined the band. In 2014 Shahen Galichian (piano, keyboards, accordion), formerly of the Golden Manor Medicine Show, joined the line-up.

The band have appeared at festivals such as Larmer Tree, Bestival, Kendal Calling and Glastonbury and released five albums, the second of which, From the Land of Miracles, was produced by Eliot James. The third and fourth albums, Westward Ho! and Wild By The Side Of The Road were produced by Al Scott whose production credits include Oysterband and the Levellers. The band's most recent EP, Hard Times Coming, released in 2019 was also produced by Scott. When the band returned from a hiatus in 2020, drummer Giri had been replaced by Alistair Hamer, formerly of Sweet Billy Pilgrim. In December 2020 the band released a Christmas single, "First Christmas Alone", accompanied by a video, with all proceeds going to the homeless charity Crisis.

In January 2022, they released their fifth studio album, Overground.

In May 2024 the band went to Middle Farm Studios in Devon to record with record producer Peter Miles, with no firm plans other than to try and record some ideas they had floating around. Miles suggested recording live sessions direct to 2 inch tape, with minimal overdubs or edits. They ended up recording 11 songs in 3 days. Those sessions were released as their sixth studio album "Lightning Strike".

In December 2024 the band released "Pull Away" a special Christmas single for the RNLI, commemorating their 200th anniversary year.

In October 2025, a new single, "Seven Kinds of Rain", was the first to be released from a new album, The Light at the Top of the Stairs, scheduled for release on 10 April 2026.

== Discography ==
=== Albums ===
List of studio albums, with selected chart positions
Title	Album details	Peak chart positions	
Title	Album details	UK Americana	UK Folk
Fidelis Ad Mortem	Released 2010; Label:	—	—
From the Land of Miracles	Released 2012; Label: Major Tom	—	—
Westward Ho!	Released 2014; Label: Union Music Store	—	—
Wild by the Side of the Road	Released 2017; Label: Major Tom	33	—
Overground	Released 2022; Label: Major Tom	–	18
Lightning Strike	Released 2024; Label: Major Tom	–	–
"—" denotes a recording that did not chart.

=== Extended plays ===
- Fuzzy Folk Riot (2009)
- Moutarde! (2015)
- Hard Times Coming (2019)

=== Singles ===
- "First Christmas Alone" (2020 - UK Singles Downloads Chart #85)

== Members ==
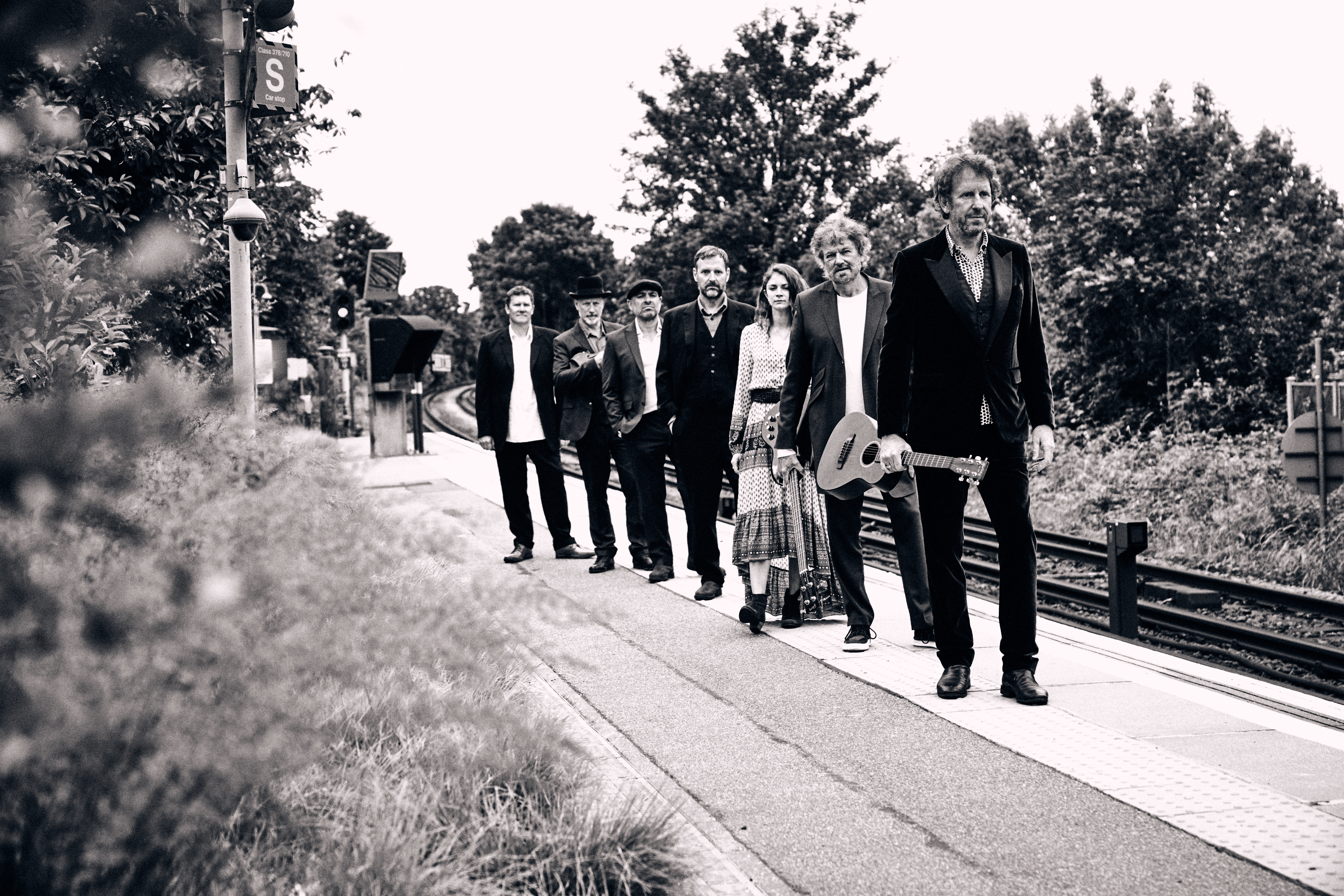
Left to right: Hamer, Bishop, Galichian, Dowling, Norris, Bowen, Studholme

- James Studholme – lead vocals, guitar
- Eddie Bishop – violin, vocals
- Tim Dowling – banjo, guitar, harmonica, vocals
- Don Bowen – bass guitar, vocals
- Alistair Hamer – drums, vocals
- Shahen Galichian - accordion, piano, keyboards, harmonica, harmonium, vocals
- Emily Norris - trumpet, vocals
