= Cryogenix =

Studio album by In Strict Confidence
- Released: August 1996 (DE) May 20, 1997 (US)
- Genre: Electro-industrial
- Label: Zoth Ommog, Metropolis Records

In Strict Confidence chronology
Cryogenix (1996)	Face the Fear (1998)

Professional ratings
Review scores
Source	Rating
AllMusic	2.5/5 stars

Cryogenix is In Strict Confidence's first album.

== Track listing ==
All lyrics are written by In Strict Confidence, except where noted; all music is composed by In Strict Confidence

Zoth Ommog
No.	Title	Length
1.	"Falling Down"	6:50
2.	"Dementia"	5:36
3.	"Inside"	4:51
4.	"Sudorific"	5:04
5.	"Become an Angel"	5:16
6.	"In 2 Deep (Life-Part 1)"	2:41
7.	"Burning Angel"	4:19
8.	"Lost In Paradise"	4:37
9.	"Crux"	4:42
10.	"Sinner"	4:19
11.	"Change My Vein"	5:25
12.	"Cryonic Suspension (2nd Life)"	3:26
Total length:		56:06

Metropolis
No.	Title	Length
1.	"Dementia"	5:37
2.	"Sudorific"	4:05
3.	"Burning Angel"	4:19
4.	"Falling Down"	6:47
5.	"Stripped" (written by Martin L. Gore)	9:10
6.	"In 2 Deep, Pt. 1"	2:43
7.	"Become an Angel"	5:16
8.	"Beautiful Pain"	4:52
9.	"Sinner"	4:19
10.	"Change My Vein"	5:26
11.	"Cryonic Suspension (2nd Life)"	3:29
12.	"Lost In Paradise"	4:37
13.	"Falling Down (Tearing Thorns Mix)"	6:40
14.	"Become An Angel (US-Remix)"	5:01
Total length:		01:12:21
