= Marina Schiptjenko =

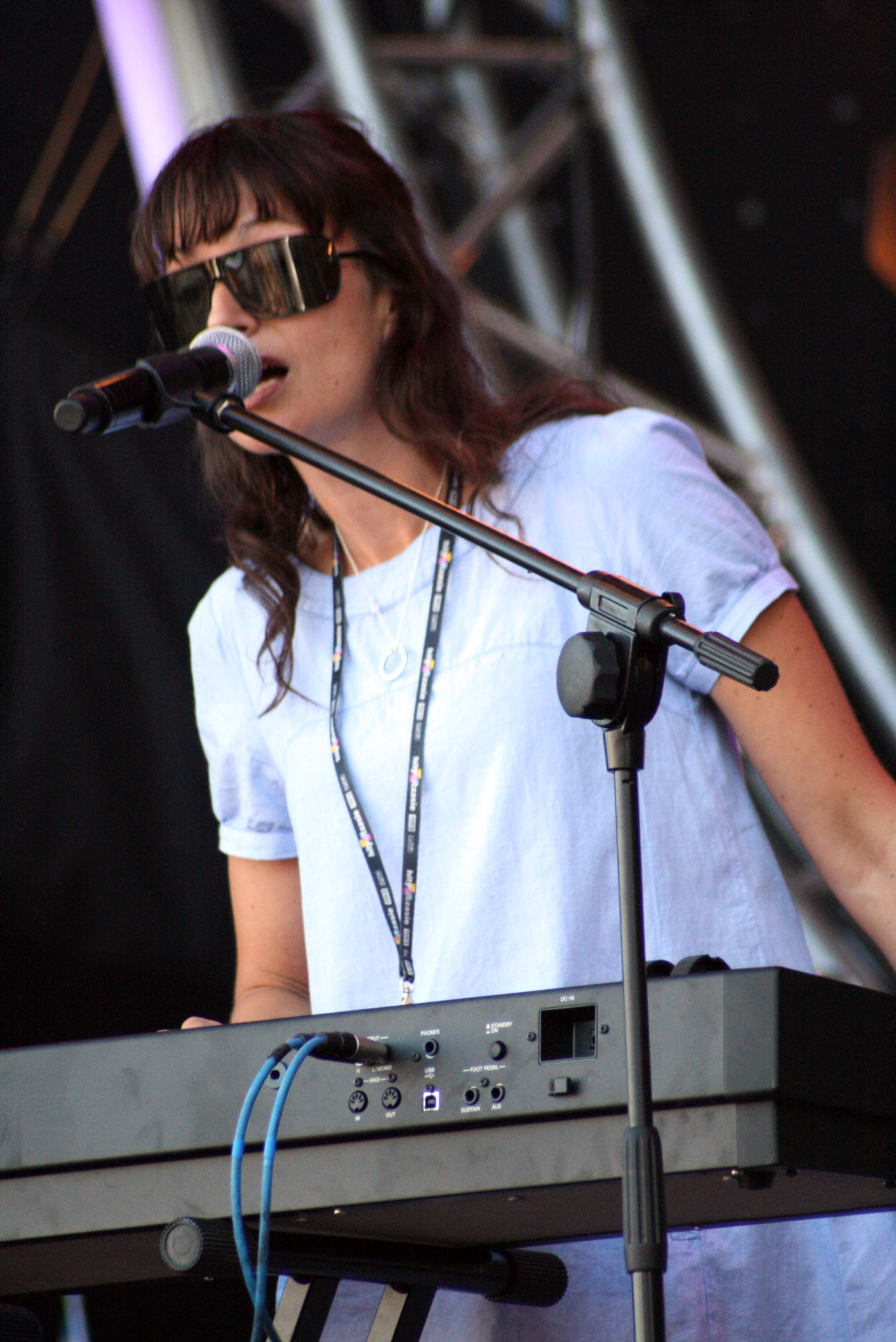

Background information
- Born: Anna Marina Schiptjenko; June 27, 1965 (age 61); Malmö Sweden
- Genres: Electropop
- Occupations: Keyboardist, backing vocalist, art dealer
- Instrument: Keyboard
- Years active: 1980–present

Anna Marina Schiptjenko (born July 27, 1965, in Malmö, Sweden) is a Swedish artist and art dealer. She is the only female member of the Swedish electronic pop group Bodies Without Organs (now known as BWO). Her mother is Swedish and her father was a Ukrainian defector from the Soviet Union.

She started her music career in the eighties, joining the synthpop band Page. The group stopped producing material in the nineties. She was asked by Alexander Bard to join Vacuum. But since this band had little success, she quit the band, shortly after Alexander left. In 2004, she joined Alexander's new project, BWO. The band is a success in Scandinavia and through Eastern Europe.

In 2010, Marina, and fellow Page bandmate Eddie Bengtsson produced and released a new album entitled "Nu" after an entire decade of the band being in hiatus. It reached number 34 in the Swedish album charts.

Besides her musical career Marina has an art gallery in Stockholm with Ciléne Andréhn since 1991. She also lives in Stockholm with her husband. She appeared in the 2017 film The Square.
