= Vacuum (band) =

Swedish pop group

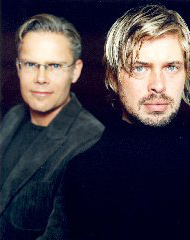
- Anders Wollbeck and Mattias Lindblom of Vacuum

Background information
- Origin: Sweden
- Genres: Electronic, pop, synthpop
- Years active: 1996–present
- Labels: Massproduktion
- Members: Mattias Lindblom; Anders Wollbeck
- Past members: Marina Schiptjenko; Alexander Bard
- Website: Facebook

Vacuum is a Swedish pop band consisting of Mattias Lindblom and Anders Wollbeck. They also work as song writers and producers under the same name. As songwriters and producers Wollbeck and Lindblom have worked with artists such as Tarja Turunen, Tina Arena, Garou, Monrose, TVXQ, Keisha Buchanan, f(x) and The Canadian Tenors. Wollbeck and Lindblom are signed to Universal Music Publishing world wide. Playing symphonic pop, the group scored successes in countries like Italy and Russia.

== History ==
Vacuum was formed in 1996 by Anders Wollbeck, Alexander Bard and Mattias Lindblom. Their first single "I Breathe" was a big hit in large parts of Europe. At that time Marina Schiptjenko was part of the group. After the second album Bard left the group. Vacuum then released the single "Starting Where the Story Ended". Schiptjenko left the group shortly after. Wollbeck and Lindblom wrote and produced, in 2004, Vacuum's critically acclaimed album Your Whole Life Is Leading up to This, marking a new direction for the band. At that point Wollbeck and Lindblom had started writing and producing for other artists as well. Vacuum then released the singles "Six Billion Voices" in 2006 and "Walk on the Sun" in 2007. In 2008 Wollbeck and Lindblom started a collaboration with Austrian pianist Michael Zlanabitnig. It resulted in the release of "Know by Now" and "My Friend Misery". The latter being a duet with Marcella Detroit. In 2009 they released "The Ocean". Another single written in collaboration with Zlanabitnig. On June 4, 2011, Vacuum released the song "Black Angels".

== Discography ==
=== Albums ===
- The Plutonium Cathedral (1997)
1. Parallel Universe (4:10)
2. I Breathe (4:35)
3. Pride in My Religion (4:01)
4. Science of the Sacred (4:52)
5. Rise and Shine Olympia (4:00)
6. Atlas Shrugged (4:38)
7. Illuminati (4:14)
8. Woman Named America (4:16)
9. Prussia (4:38)
10. The Shape of Things to Come (4:01)
11. Sign on the Skyline (5:25)
12. Tin Soldiers (4:29)
13. Closer Than the Holy Ghost (5:02)
- Seance at the Chaebol (1998)
1. Tonnes of Attraction (4:21)
2. Power (3:23)
3. Tears of a Nation (4:14)
4. Let the Mountain Come to Me (3:29)
5. Chant like a Mantra (5:02)
6. Satyricon (4:06)
7. Nuclear India (4:16)
8. The Culture of Night (3:55)
9. Big Ideas Grand Vision (4:15)
10. Ulysses (4:15)
11. I Breathe (Radio Edit) (3:55)
12. Science of the Sacred (Radio Edit) (3:49)
- Culture of Night (2000, three new songs + two songs with new sound, Russian release only)
- Culture of Night (2002, yet another two new songs)
- Your Whole Life Is Leading Up to This (2004)
1. Intro
2. Your whole life is leading up to this
3. They do it (feat. K)
4. Mind your Mind
5. The Void
6. In the Dirt
7. Love Earth Cry (feat. Jessica Pilnäs)
8. Something Evil I Love
9. Sea of Silence
10. A Shallow Heart
11. Queen
12. Fools like me
13. Dead
14. Temporary Solution
- Your Whole Life Is Leading Up to This (2007, five new bonustracks + video, German release only)

=== Singles ===
- "I Breathe" (1996)
- "Science of the Sacred" (1997)
- "Pride in My Religion" (1997)
- "Tonnes of Attraction" (1998)
- "Let the Mountain Come to Me" (1998)
- "Icaros" (2000)
- "Starting (Where the Story Ended)" (2002)
- "Fools Like Me" (2004)
- "They Do It" (2004)
- "The Void" (2005)
- "Open My Eyes" (2005)
- "Six Billion Voices" (2006)
- "Walk On The Sun" (2007)
- "Know By Now" (2008)
- "My Friend Misery" (2008)
- "Where Angels Belong" (2009)
- "The Ocean" (2009)
- "Black Angels" (2011)
- "I Loved You" (2012)
- "Animal" (2013)
- "You Are Everywhere" (2020)

== Members ==
- Mattias Lindblom
- Anders Wollbeck
