= AstroGirl =

American teen magazine

ASTROgirl! is a teenage magazine printed a few times a year. The magazine was started by Bauer Publishing, the United States division of the German firm Bauer Verlagsgruppe. It is an entertainment magazine with quizzes, celebrity gossip, games and posters with a focus on astrology, superstitions, dreams, psychics, and other paranormal topics. The first issue was released in the Summer of 2005. The headquarters is in Englewood Cliffs, New Jersey.

American Media, Inc. acquired Bauer's US children's magazines in 2018.

== Circulation ==
Each issue of ASTROgirl has a circulation of 400,000 and remains on stands for 8–12 weeks.
