= Holy (In Strict Confidence album) =

Studio album by In Strict Confidence
- Released: January 12, 2004
- Studio: Maschinenraum, Weltherren Studios
- Genre: Electronic music
- Length: 1:12:10
- Label: Minuswelt Musikfabrik (EU), Metropolis Records (US), Irond (RU)

In Strict Confidence chronology
Mistrust the Angels (2002)	Holy (2004)	Exile Paradise (2006)

Professional ratings
Review scores
Source	Rating
AllMusic	3/5 stars

Holy is In Strict Confidence's fifth studio album. The box set includes: Holy album CD, bonus CD with exclusive instrumental track "Alpha Omega", six postcards and three stickers. The album reached #83 on the German national charts.

== Track listing ==
All lyrics are written by In Strict Confidence; all music is composed by In Strict Confidence

No.	Title	Length
1.	"Eye Of Heaven" (Guitar (Additional) – Michael Schäfer)	5:15
2.	"Seven Lives" (Vocals (Additional) – Ion Javelin, Words By – Inga Göttsch)	6:26
3.	"Babylon"	5:45
4.	"Closing Eyes" (Lyrics By – Nadine Stelzer)	5:30
5.	"Heal Me"	4:42
6.	"Emergency" (Vocals, Lyrics By – Antje Schulz)	6:51
7.	"Another Night" (Guitar (Additional) – Michael Schäfer, Words By – Inga Göttsch)	5:42
8.	"No Love Will Heal"	6:16
9.	"The Darkest Corridors" (Vocals (Female) – Nadine Stelzer)	6:40
10.	"Sleepless" (Vocals, Lyrics By – Antje Schulz)	5:34
11.	"Alpha Centauri"	13:22
Total length:		1:12:10

Alpha Omega (Box Set, Disc 2)
No.	Title	Length
1.	"Alpha Omega" (Voice – P. Simper)	12:15
Total length:		12:15

== EPs ==
- Seven Lives
