= Fabricator (album) =

Studio album by BWO
- Released: September 19, 2007
- Genre: Pop
- Length: 59:17
- Label: Capitol, EMI
- Producer: Alexander Bard, Anders Hansson

BWO chronology
| Halcyon Nights (2006) | Fabricator (2007) | Pandemonium – The Singles Collection (2008) |

Singles from Fabricator
- 1. "Save My Pride" Released: 2007; 2. "Let It Rain / Rhythm Drives Me Crazy" Released: 2007; 3. "The Destiny of Love" Released: 2007; 4. "Give Me the Night" Released: 2007; 5. "Gomenasai" Released: 2008

Fabricator is the third studio album by BWO. It was released on September 19, 2007. It peaked at number 6 on the Swedish Albums Chart. It was promoted with five singles, with the second single, "Rhythm Drives Me Crazy", releasing on August 22, 2007.

== Track listing ==
| No. | Title | Length |
|---|---|---|
| 1. | "Last Flight to San Francisco" | 3:32 |
| 2. | "Give Me the Night" | 3:09 |
| 3. | "Let It Rain" | 3:30 |
| 4. | "The Destiny of Love" | 3:50 |
| 5. | "Gomenasai" | 3:27 |
| 6. | "We Should Be Dancing" | 3:49 |
| 7. | "Stay with You Again" | 4:14 |
| 8. | "Rhythm Drives Me Crazy" | 3:50 |
| 9. | "Save My Pride" | 4:00 |
| 10. | "Happiness" | 2:54 |
| 11. | "Hooked on the Danger" | 3:33 |
| 12. | "Concrete Jungle" | 3:46 |
| 13. | "Paradise on Mars" | 4:03 |
| 14. | "Chariots of Fire" | 4:09 |
| 15. | "Save My Pride (The Attic Remix Radio Edit)" | 4:02 |
| 16. | "The Destiny of Love (The Attic Remix Radio Edit)" | 3:23 |

== Charts ==
| Chart | Peak position |
|---|---|
| Swedish Albums (Sverigetopplistan) | 6 |
