= Barcelona (BWO song) =

Single by BWO

from the album Pandemonium - The Singles Collection
- Released: 26 May 2008
- Recorded: 2007–2008
- Genre: Electronica, pop
- Length: 3:45
- Label: Capitol; EMI
- Songwriter(s): Alexander Bard, Anders Hansson, Martin Rolinski
- Producer(s): Alexander Bard, Anders Hansson

BWO singles chronology
"Lay Your Love On Me" (2008)	"Barcelona" (2008)	"The Bells Of Freedom" (2008)

Barcelona is an electronica song performed by Swedish band BWO. The song was released as a second single from their first greatest hits album, Pandemonium - The Singles Collection in Sweden, on May 26, 2008.

== Track list ==
Digital Download; CD Single:

1. Barcelona (Radio Edit) 3:45
2. Barcelona (Shane 54 & Myon Retrofuturism Edit) 3:24
3. Barcelona (Soundfactory Radio Edit) 3:40
4. Barcelona (Ali Payami Remix) 3:41
5. Barcelona (Oscar Holter Body Mix) 4:51
6. Barcelona (Shane 54 & Myon Retrofutrism Remix) 5:55
7. Barcelona (Soundfactory Reconstruction Anthem) 6:59
8. Barcelona (Soundfactory Pumpin' DubBarcelona) 8:01
9. Barcelona (Hanssonic Featuring Felix & Märta Remix) 5:58
10. Barcelona (Miss Leeloo After Hours Remix) 4:56

== Charts ==
Chart (2008)	Peak position
Sweden (Sverigetopplistan)	56
