= Halcyon Days (BWO album) =

Studio album by BWO
- Released: 19 April 2006
- Genre: Pop
- Length: 62:30
- Label: Capital, EMI
- Producer: Alexander Bard, Anders Hansson

BWO chronology
Prototype (2005)	Halcyon Days (2006)	Halcyon Nights (2006)

Singles from Halcyon Days
- 1. "Temple of Love" Released: 2006; 2. "We Could Be Heroes" Released: 2006; 3. "Will My Arms Be Strong Enough" Released: 2006; 4. "Chariots of Fire" Released: 2006

Halcyon Days is the second studio album by BWO. It was released on 19 April 2006. It peaked at number 1 on the Swedish Albums Chart.

== Track listing ==
No.	Title	Length
1.	"Chariots of Fire"	4:17
2.	"Temple of Love"	3:25
3.	"Will My Arms Be Strong Enough"	4:16
4.	"We Could Be Heroes"	4:23
5.	"Juggernaut"	3:25
6.	"Hanging on the Phone"	3:50
7.	"Angel of Night"	3:20
8.	"I Keep Walking On"	4:09
9.	"Marrakech"	4:07
10.	"Obsession"	3:43
11.	"Crystal Odyssey"	3:20
12.	"Haunted"	3:05
13.	"Voodoo Magic"	3:41
14.	"Sixteen Tons of Hardware"	3:30
15.	"Sunshine in the Rain"	3:30
16.	"Open Door"	3:29

== Charts ==
=== Weekly charts ===
Chart (2006)	Peak position
Swedish Albums (Sverigetopplistan)	1

=== Year-end charts ===
Chart (2006)	Position
Swedish Albums (Sverigetopplistan)	33

== Halcyon Nights ==
Halcyon Nights

Remix album by BWO
- Released: December 27, 2006
- Genre: Pop, synthpop
- Label: Capital; EMI
- Producer: Alexander Bard, Anders Hansson

BWO chronology
Halcyon Days (2006)	Halcyon Nights (2006)	Fabricator (2007)

Halcyon Nights is a remix album containing remixed versions of the songs released on Halcyon Days.

The album was released on December 27, 2006.

=== Track listing ===
1. Chariots of Fire (Radio Edit) - 4:08
2. Sixteen Tons of Hardware (Poker Pets 12" Mix) - 7:12
3. Temple of Love (SoundFactory Reconstruction Anthem Radio Remix) - 3:59
4. Open Door (Paradise Garage Mix) - 4:43
5. Obsession (Johan S Remix) - 3:09
6. Sunshine in the Rain (Sound Factory New York Anthem Edit) - 4:58
7. Sixteen Tons of Hardware (Brasco Club Mix Edit) - 7:20
8. Temple of Love (Carl Ryden Remix) - 7:07
9. Voodoo Magic (SoundFactory Big Room Anthem Edit) - 5:16
10. Open Door (DJ Slow Mix) - 4:05
11. Chariots of Fire (Remix Radio Edit) - 3:40
12. We Could Be Heroes (SoundFactory Futuretro Mix) - 5:27
13. Living in a Fantasy (Johan S Remix) - 3:32
14. Sunshine in the Rain (Johan Afterglow Electro Mix) - 3:51
15. Sixteen Tons of Hardware (SoundFactory Supersonic Anthem Edit) - 5:10
16. Open Door (Brasco Remake) - 3:45
