= Love Kills! =

Studio album by In Strict Confidence
- Released: 2 Feb, 2000
- Genre: Electro-industrial
- Length: 1:07:11
- Language: English, Deutsch
- Label: Bloodline, WTII Records
- Producer: Dennis Ostermann, Jörg Schelte

In Strict Confidence chronology
Face the Fear (1998)	Love Kills! (2000)	Mistrust the Angels (2002)

Singles from Love Kills!
- 1. "Kiss Your Shadow" Released: 2000; 2. "Zauberschloss" Released: July 2001; 3. "The Truth Inside Of Me" Released: 26 November 2001

Professional ratings
Review scores
Source	Rating
AllMusic	4/5 stars

Love Kills! is In Strict Confidence's third studio album.

== Track listing ==
All lyrics are written by In Strict Confidence; all music is composed by In Strict Confidence

No.	Title	Length
1.	"Zauberschloß"	7:50
2.	"Heaven is the Place to Be"	5:30
3.	"Stern"	5:54
4.	"The Truth Inside of Me"	5:04
5.	"Spread Your Wings Part I"	5:22
6.	"Kiss Your Shadow"	3:59
7.	"Silent Memorial"	4:05
8.	"Wenn Ich Die Augen Schließe"	6:30
9.	"Weltuntergang"	4:41
10.	"The Setting Off the Sun"	3:37
11.	"Spread Your Wings Part II"	3:33
12.	"Six Six Six Seconds Silence in Heaven"	11:06
Total length:		1:07:11

The last track is 666 seconds of complete silence.

There is also a Limited Fan Edition boxset - 1000 copies. It includes: album CD, 3" bonus CD, 16 page oversized booklet, condom, metal-pin, postcard set and sticker set.

3" bonus CD in the limited edition box set contains 3 remixes by Controlled Fusion.

=== Bonus CD track listing ===
All lyrics are written by In Strict Confidence; all music is composed by Controlled Fusion

No.	Title	Length
1.	"Stern (NASA-Mix)"	6:21
2.	"Kiss Your Shadow (Q-Mix)"	6:16
3.	"Weltuntergang (Roswell-Mix)"	3:57
Total length:		16:34
