= Temple of Love (BWO song) =

Single by BWO

from the album Halcyon Days
- Released: 15 March 2006
- Recorded: 2006
- Genre: Electronica; Pop
- Length: 3:24
- Label: Capitol; EMI
- Songwriter(s): Alexander Bard, Anders Hansson, Martin Rolinski
- Producer(s): 2N Productions

BWO singles chronology
"Voodoo Magic" (2005)	"Temple of Love" (2006)	"We Could Be Heroes" (2006)

"Temple of Love" is an electronica song performed by Swedish band BWO. The song was released as the first single from their second album, Halcyon Days in Sweden, on April 19, 2006.

BWO competed in the Swedish Melodifestivalen 2006 with Temple of Love, qualifying for the final at the Stockholm Globe Arena, where they finished second behind Carola. Temple of Love went on to reach Number 1 in the Swedish singles chart, and has been assessed as the most internationally successful Melodifestivalen song from the 2006 competition.

== Track list ==
Digital download; CD single:

1. Temple of Love (radio edit) 3:25
2. Temple of Love (SoundFactory radio mix) 3:59
3. Temple of Love (Brasco 80s mix) 3:55
4. Temple of Love (Glam As You mix) 5:48

CD Single - The Club Mixes: Temple of Love (radio edit) 03:25 Temple of Love (Organs Without Bodies remix) 05:18 Temple of Love (SoundFactory Reconstruction Anthem) 09:08 Temple of Love (SoundFactory Thumping Sex dub) 06:00 Temple of Love (Carl Ryden remix) 07:07 Temple of Love (Air Bureau remix) 08:58

== Charts ==
=== Weekly charts ===
Chart (2006)	Peak position
Hungary (Rádiós Top 40)	37
Sweden (Sverigetopplistan)	1

=== Year-end charts ===
Chart (2006)	Position
Sweden (Sverigetopplistan)	10
