= In Strict Confidence =

German electro-industrial band

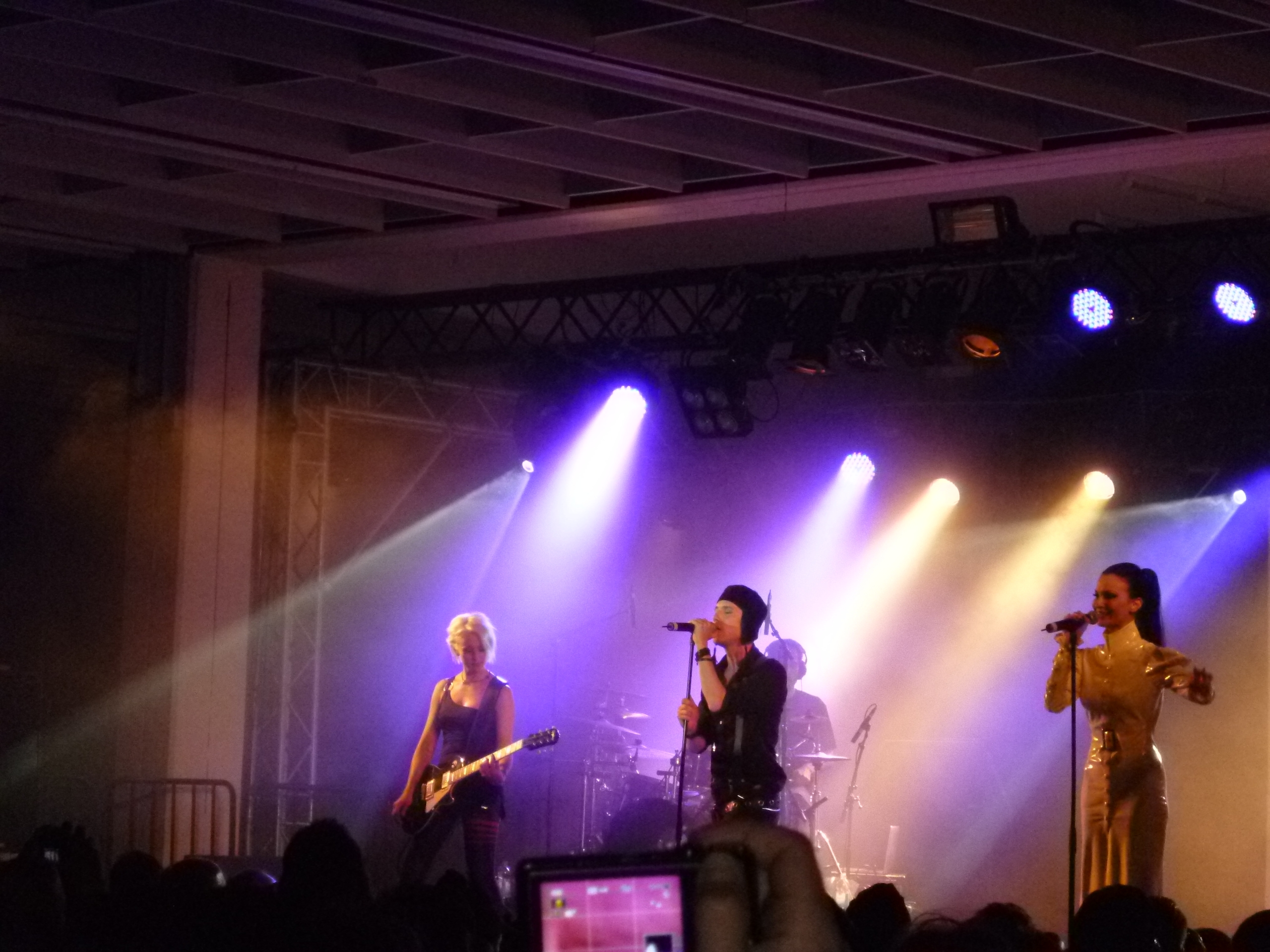

Background information
- Origin: Germany
- Genres: Electro-industrial, darkwave
- Years active: 1989–present
- Labels: Zoth Ommog, Metropolis, WTII, Bloodline, Minuswelt Musikfabrik
- Spinoffs: Controlled Fusion
- Members: Dennis Ostermann; Jörg Schelte; Stefan Vesper; Heidi Pulkkinen; Nina de Lianin
- Past members: Thomas Steiger; Antje Schulz
- Website: instrictconfidence.com

In Strict Confidence is a German electro-industrial band. Formed in 1989, they were known as Seal of Secrecy until 1992. In Strict Confidence has been signed to several record labels, including Metropolis Records and WTII Records.

== History ==
=== Founding 1989–2000 ===
In Strict Confidence started out as a quartet, but stripped down to a duo (Dennis Ostermann and Jörg Schelte) in 1992, releasing two demos tapes on the way to their debut release Cryogenix on Zoth Ommog in 1996 (the initial pressing of this album sold out in one week), shortly followed by an EP Collapse. The band left Zoth Ommog after releasing follow-up effort Face the Fear in 1998, due to payment disputes. The third album Love Kills! was released on the newly formed and short lived Bloodline label two years later.

=== Band Growth 2001–2010 ===
Founding member Stefan Vesper then re-joined the group in time for Mistrust the Angels in 2002 with subsequent albums Holy and Exile Paradise appearing at two-year intervals. These albums saw the project's sound diversify further, notably with increasing use of female vocals from Antje Schulz, vocalist of the band Chandeen, and the addition of female vocalist Nina de Lianin

== Side Projects ==
Dennis Ostermann has a side project called Controlled Fusion. Stefan Vesper has produced material under his own name and also as Steve Dragon.

== Members ==
- Dennis Ostermann (vocals, songwriting)
- Jörg Schelte (songwriting, programming)
- Stefan Vesper (drums, songwriting) (left in 1992, returned in 2001)
- Heidi Pulkkinen (guitars) (credited as HayDee Sparks) (joined in 2008)
- Nina de Lianin (vocals, lyrics) (joined in 2009)

=== Guests ===
- Nadine Stelzer (female vocals) (from 2000 to 2004)
- Heiko Montkowski (guitars) (from 2000 to 2002)

=== Former Members ===
- Thomas Steiger (keyboards) (left 1992, continues in non-musical role)
- Antje Schulz (vocals, lyrics) (joined in 2004)

== Discography ==
=== Albums ===
- Cryogenix (1996)
- Face the Fear (1997)
- Love Kills! (2000)
- Mistrust the Angels (2002) – #87 Offizielle Deutsche Charts
- Holy (2004) – #83 Offizielle Deutsche Charts
- Exile Paradise (2006) – #3 German Alternative Charts (DAC)
- La Parade Monstrueuse (2010)
- Utopia (2012)
- The Hardest Heart (2016)
- Hate2Love (2018)
- The Final Kiss (2026)

=== EPs ===
- Collapse (1997)
- Industrial Love/Prediction (1998) (limited to 1111 copies)
- Zauberschloss (2001)
- Herzattacke (2002)
- Zauberschloss/Kiss Your Shadow (2002)
- Engelsstaub (2002)
- Seven Lives (2004) – #5 DAC Singles
- Holy (The Hecq Destruxxion) (2004) (Remix CD in metal case, limited to 1111 copies)
- Where Sun & Moon Unite (2006) – #8 DAC Singles
- The Serpent's Kiss (2006) – #4 DAC Singles
- Exile Paradise (The Hecq Destruxxion) (2007) (Remix CD in metal case, limited to 1111 copies)
- My Despair (2009)
- Silver Bullets (2010)
- Set Me Free (2011)
- Morpheus (2012)
- Somebody Else's Dream (2016)
- Everything Must Change (2016)
- Herz & Frozen Kisses (2017)
- Mercy (2018)

=== Compilations ===
- Angels Anger Overkill (1998)
- Laugh, Cry and Scream (2010)
- Lifelines Vol. 1 (1991-1998) (2014)
- Lifelines Vol. 2 (1998-2004) (2015)
- Lifelines Vol. 3 (2006-2010) (2015)

=== Singles ===
- Dementia (1997) (Vinyl - limited to 500 copies)
- Aghast View vs. ISC (Industrial Love) (1998) (Vinyl, limited to 333 copies)
- Kiss Your Shadow (2000) – #35 DAC Top 100 Singles of 2000
- The Truth Inside of Me (2001) (limited to 1500 copies)
- Mistrust the Bonus Edition (2002)
- Babylon (2003) – #96 DAC Top Singles of 2003
- The Sun Always Shines on T.V. (2005) (limited boxset with picture viewer, limited to 2000 copies)
- Tiefer (2012)
- Justice (2013) (digital only)

=== Tape ===
- Sound Attack (1992) (Demo limited to 50)
- Hell Inside/Hell Outside (1994) (Double Cassette)
