= Face the Fear =

Studio album by In Strict Confidence
- Released: April 1998 (DE), August 1998 (US)
- Recorded: 1997–1998
- Studio: Maschinenraum
- Genre: Electro-Industrial
- Label: Zoth Ommog, Metropolis Records, Minuswelt Musikfabrik

In Strict Confidence chronology
Cryogenix (1996)	Face the Fear (1998)	Love Kills! (2000)

Face the Fear is In Strict Confidence's second studio album.

== Track listing ==
All lyrics are written by In Strict Confidence; all music is composed by In Strict Confidence

No.	Title	Length
1.	"Empire"	5:53
2.	"Alles In Mir"	6:05
3.	"Prediction"	4:31
4.	"Industrial Love"	5:47
5.	"Hidden Thoughts"	4:57
6.	"Room 101"	5:13
7.	"Engel Mit Feuer und Schwert"	4:27
8.	"Way of Redemption"	3:08
9.	"I Don't Care"	6:10
10.	"Ein Mensch, Ein Kämpfer und Ein Schlächter"	6:07
Total length:		52:18
