= Page (Swedish band) =

Swedish synthpop band

- Origin: Malmö, Sweden
- Genres: Synthpop
- Years active: 1980–2000; 2010–present
- Members: Marina Schiptjenko; Eddie Bengtsson
- Past members: Anders Eliasson; Jan Adolfsson; Michael Thornqvist; John Liljestrand

Page are a Swedish synthpop band. Page are often credited with being the first band to bring synthpop music to Sweden. Their music and band members (particularly Eddie Bengtsson) influenced many subsequent Swedish synthpop acts, including Elegant Machinery, S.P.O.C.K, Sista Mannen På Jorden and KieTheVez.

== History ==
Formed in 1980 by Eddie Bengtsson and Marina Schiptjenko, soon joined by Anders Eliasson, the band quickly gained underground cult-status releasing many singles such as Dansande man, Som skjuten ur en kanon, Blå fötter and Som en vind. Though most of their important influential work was released in the 1980s their first album, the self-titled Page, was released in 1991. Page continued releasing music throughout the 90's but is still most fondly remembered in the Swedish synthpop scene for their early singles, especially Dansande Man. Though the band has never officially disbanded, it has been remarkably quiet since a performance at SEMA (Swedish Electronic Music Awards) in 2000 when the band promised nothing new would ever be released under the name Page. However, a compilation covering their two decades of work was released in 2000.

After a decade of silence, in 2010 Page released an album of newly recorded material called Nu, and performed two tracks live on Swedish TV show Nyhetsmorgon in May 2010. The album reached number 34 on the official Swedish album chart, Sverigetopplistan, following its release. Page performed at the ElectriXmas events in Malmö in 2012 and 2012, along with other selected shows. The latter appearance was part of a special performance by participants in the Friends of Electronically Yours album project, which was organised to raise money for charity.

In 2013, Page released Hemma on the Swedish label, Wonderland Records. This led to a headline show in London, England, for the event, An Evening with the Swedish Synth. In 2018, Page returned to London, releasing the Adapted EP for the occasion.

A live recording of Page's performance in Gothenburg, Sweden, in October 2019, was released by the online magazine, Cold War Night Life, as Fakta för alla Göteborg, an 87 minute concert film.

The album En ny våg, which was released in 2023 on both vinyl and on CD in gatefold sleeve, contained 10 newly written songs recorded during 2022 and 2023. This time Page had worked with guest artists such as Chris Payne and R.Russell Bell known from UK groups Dramatis and Tubeway Army.

== Discography ==
=== Full-length albums ===
- Page (1991)
- Hallå (var tog månbasen vägen?) (1994)
- Lost tapes (1994)
- Glad (1995)
- Hur så? (1996)
- Helt nära (1998)
- Nu (2010)
- Hemma (2013)
- Det är ingen vacker värld men det råkar vara så det ser ut (2017)
- Fakta för Alla (2019)
- Aska under mitt Skinn (2020)
- En ny våg (2023)
- Inget motstånd (2025)

=== Compilations ===
- Så pass! Page 1980-2000 (2000)

=== Live albums ===
- Page live på SAMA 2000 (2000)

=== Singles ===
- "Dansande man" / "Aldrig mer" (1984)
- "Som skjuten ur en kanon" (1987)
- "Blå fötter" (1987)
- "Som en vind" (1989)
- "Bilmusik" (1994)
- "Förlåt" (1995)
- "Jag väntar" (1995)
- "Står i din väg" (1996)
- "Hur mår du?" (1994)
- "Svänger" (1994)
- "På ett berg" (1994)
- "Ibland" (1997)
- "Ingenting kvar" (1994)
- "Som det var" (1999)
