= S.P.O.C.K =

Swedish synthpop band

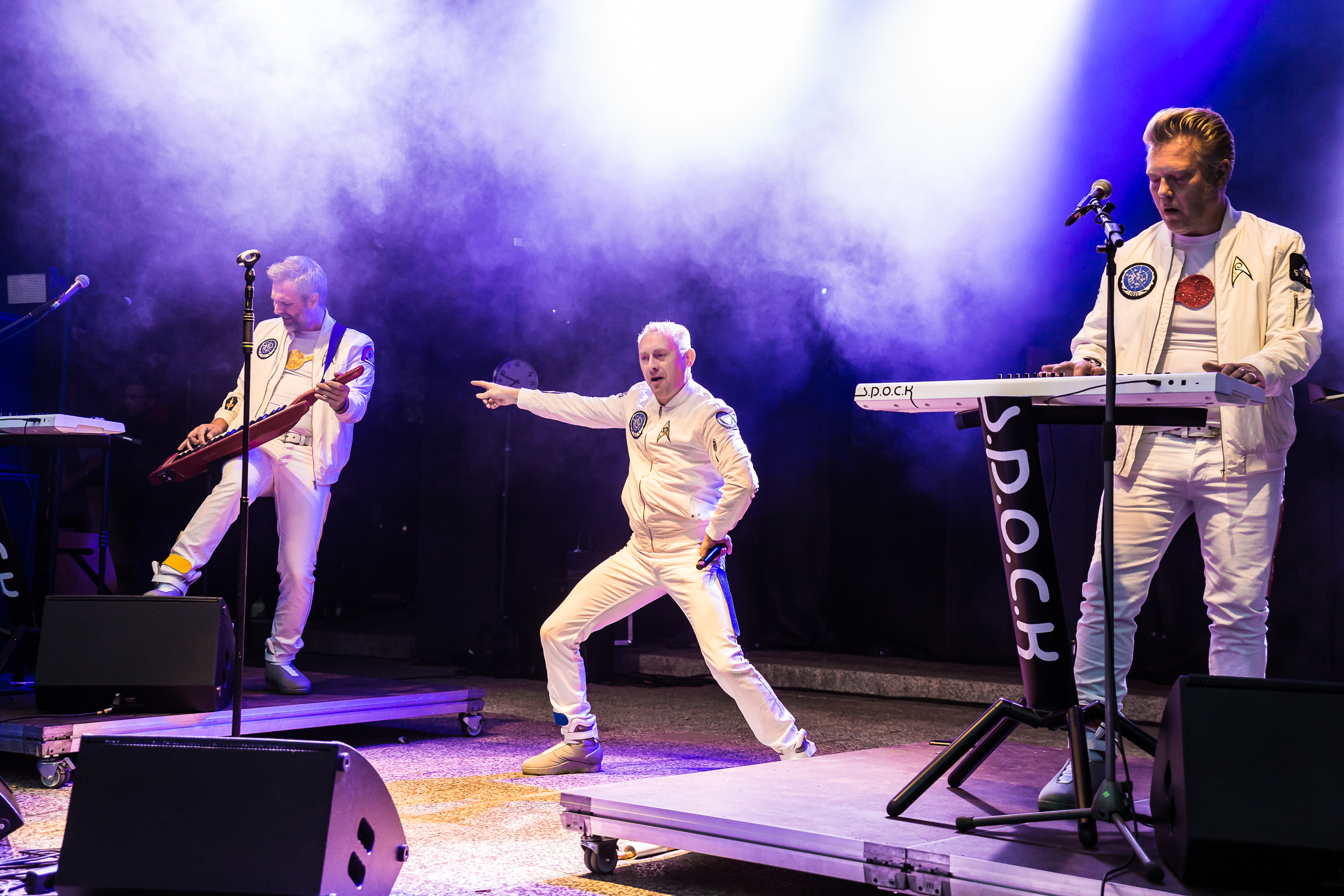
- S.P.O.C.K at Nocturnal Culture Night 2018 in Deutzen

Background information
- Origin: Sweden
- Genres: Electro-industrial, synthpop
- Years active: 1988 – present
- Labels: Energy Rekords; SubSpace Communications; Bloodline
- Members: Alexander Hofman (Android); Valdi Solemo (Val Solo); Johan Malmgren (Yo-Haan)
- Past members: Johan Billing (Plasteroid); Finn Albertsson (Cybernoid); Eddie Bengtsson (Eddie B. Kirk); Christer Hermodsson (Crull-E)

S.P.O.C.K (a.k.a. Star Pilot On Channel K) is a Swedish synthpop band which formed around 1988.

== Background ==
The band's original lineup was songwriter Eddie Bengtsson (formerly a founding member of Page), Finn Albertsson, and vocalist Alexander Hofman. Over time the members of the band have shifted: Johan Billing was a member of the band from 1994 to 1998, but with the release of S.P.O.C.K: 1999 (in 1999) the band's lineup changed to one with Alexander Hofman (the band's only remaining founding member), Johan Malmgren (former member of Elegant Machinery and Aaron Sutcliffe) and Christer Hermodsson.

In 1988, Eddie Bengtsson wrote a handful of songs to be performed at Finn Albertsson's birthday party, with Alexander Hofman performing vocals; the three young men dubbed the band Mr. Spock (after the name for the character Spock of Star Trek). After the performance at the party, the band continued for several months to play at other house parties, but soon managed to secure some event bookings. In 1989, the band members contacted Paramount Pictures for permission to use the name "Mr. Spock". When Paramount demanded a heavy compensation for the privilege, the band renamed themselves using the initials S.P.O.C.K, which are an acronym for Star Pilot On Channel K.

S.P.O.C.K's commercial success began in 1990 when the Swedish record label Accelerating Blue Fish published "Silicon Dream" as a limited-edition 7-inch single. The lyrical subject matter of S.P.O.C.K's songs frequently centers on science fiction stories, (in particular, Star Trek). Other topics include alien-human relations and life in space. Representative songs include: "Alien Attack", "E.T. Phone Home", "Never Trust a Klingon", "Not Human", "In Space No One Can Hear You Scream", "Mr. Spock's Brain", "Dr. McCoy" and "Astrogirl".

On stage the band members adopted a cyberpunk/sci-fi-esque personae, with Eddie Bengtsson calling himself "Eddie B. Kirk", Alexander Hofman as "Android", and Finn Albertsson as "Cybernoid". Together with such bands as Page, Elegant Machinery, Sista Mannen På Jorden and Kiethevez, S.P.O.C.K helped to define the sound of the Swedish synthpop movement.

In 1997, members of S.P.O.C.K started their own recording label SubSpace Communications. The band's 1999 album, 1999, ranked #25 on the German Alternative Chart's (DAC) 1999 Top 50 Albums chart.

In 2010 Christer Hermodsson left the band in order to focus on other musical endeavors. He was then replaced by Valdi Solemo. The band's current line up is vocalist Alexander Hofman (a.k.a. Android - the only remaining founding member), keyboardist Valdi Solemo (a.k.a. Val Solo), and keyboardist Johan Malmgren (a.k.a. Yo-Haan).

During the last years S.P.O.C.K has focused more on live gigs. Mostly in Germany, but also in Sweden, Canada, Estonia, Mexico, United Kingdom & the Czech Republic.

Johan Malmgren and Eskil Simonsson of the band Covenant formed the band Aaron Sutcliffe in 1999 to perform synthpop covers of Elvis Presley songs.

S.P.O.C.K, current line-up live at Wave-Gotik-Treffen 2017, Leipzig

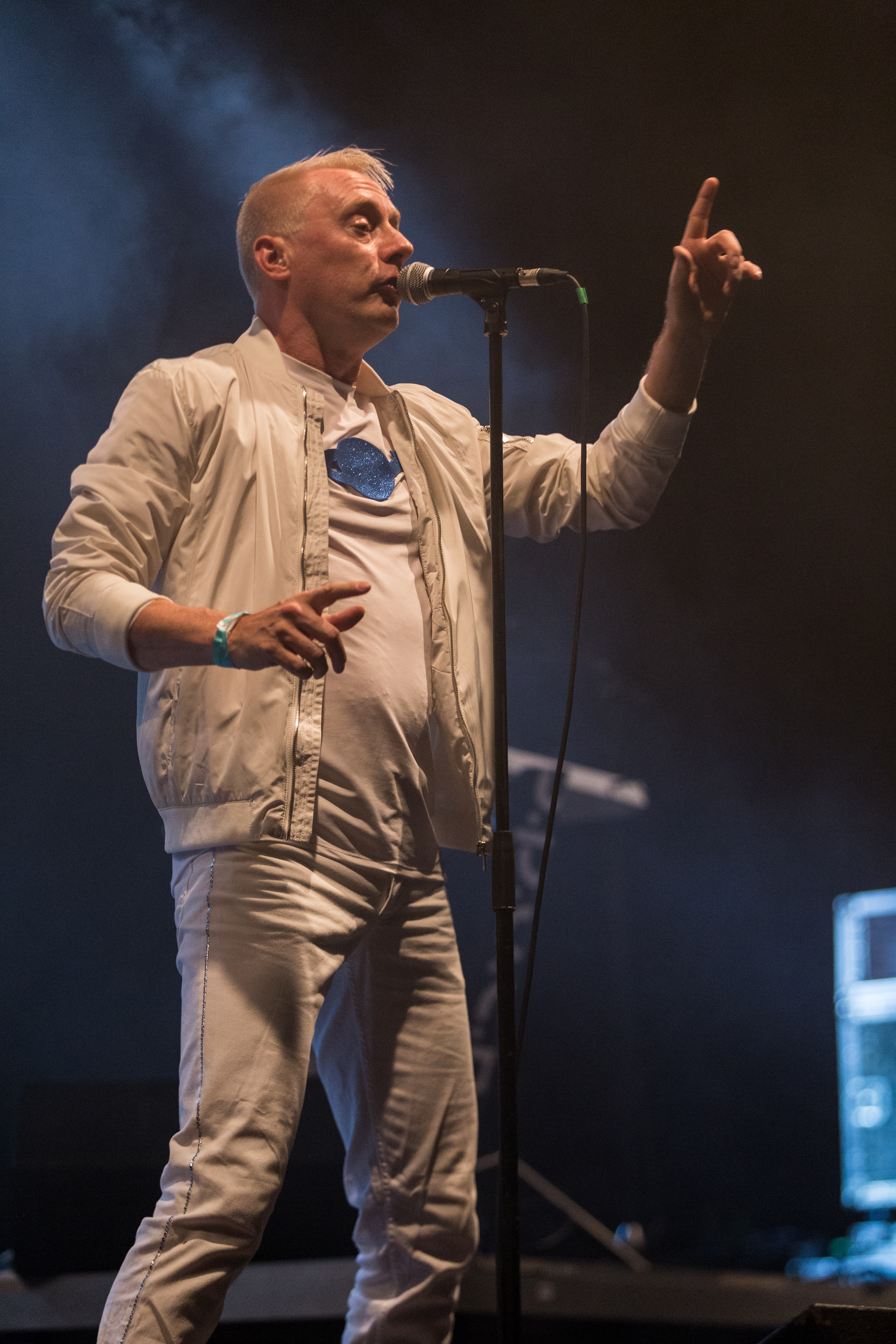
Alexander Hofman

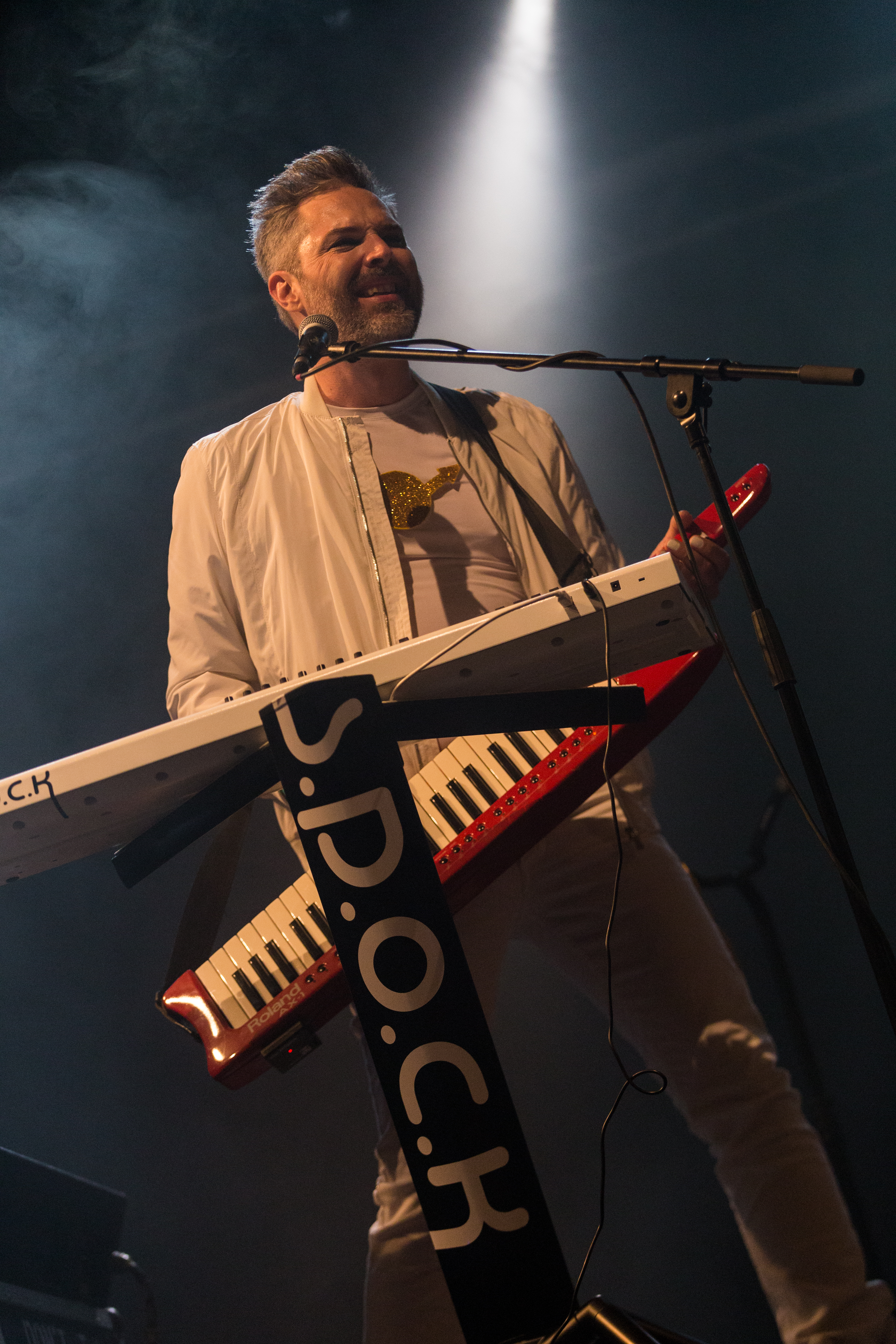
Valdi Solemo

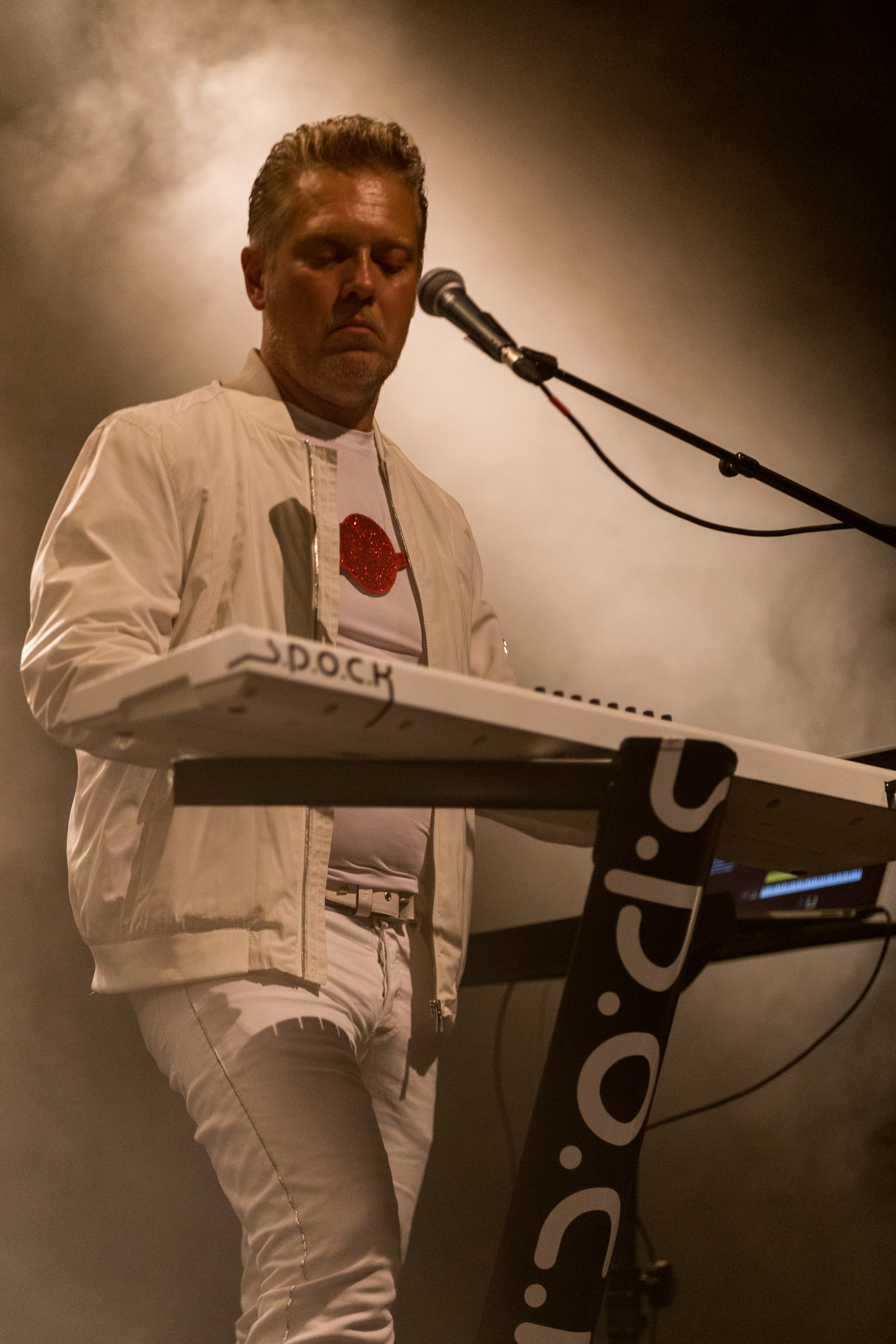
Johan Malmgren

== Discography ==
=== Albums ===
- Five Year Mission – CD (1993) Energy Rekords
- Alien Worlds – CD (1995) Energy Rekords
- Assignment: Earth – CD (1997) SubSpace Communications/VISION Records/TCM Musikproduktionsgesellschaft mbH • CD (1998) SubSpace Communications – #16 CMJ RPM Charts (U.S.)
- S.P.O.C.K: 1999 – CD (1999) SubSpace Communications/VISION Records – #29 CMJ RPM Charts (U.S.); #25 DAC (Germany)
- 2001: A S.P.O.C.K Odyssey – CD (2001) Bloodline/SubSpace Communications

=== Compilation Albums ===
- A Piece of the Action – 2xCD Ltd. Edition (1995) Energy Rekords
- Earth Orbit: Live – CD (1997) SubSpace Communications/VISION Records
- Another Piece of the Action – CD and Vinyl (limited to 500 copies) (2012) SubSpace Communications

=== Self-Releases ===
- Official Fan Club – CD (1997) no label
- Demo – CD (2000) no label

=== Singles ===
- Silicon Dream – 7" (1990) Accelerating Blue Fish
- Never Trust a Klingon – CD Single (1992) Energy Rekords
- Strange Dimensions – CD Single (1993) Energy Rekords
- Never Trust a Klingon (2294 AD) – CD Single (1994) Energy Rekords
- Astrogirl – CD Single (1994) Energy Rekords
- All E.T:s Aren't Nice – CD Single (1995) Energy Rekords
- Alien Attack – CD Single (1997) SubSpace Communications/VISION Records
- E.T. Phone Home – CD Single (1997) SubSpace Communications/VISION Records
- Speed of Light – CD Single (1998) SubSpace Communications
- Dr. McCoy – CD Single (1998) SubSpace Communications
- Klingon 2000 – CD Single (2000) Bloodline/SubSpace Communications – #93 DAC Top Singles 2000
- Where Rockets Fly – CD Single (2000) Bloodline/SubSpace Communications
- Queen of Space – CD Single (2001) SubSpace Communications
- Satellites – CD Single (2001) Bloodline/SubSpace Communications

=== Videos ===
- Live At Virtual X-Mas 93 – VHS (1994) Energy Rekords

=== Compilation appearances ===
- I Sometimes Wish I Was Famous – A Swedish Tribute To Depeche Mode – CD track No. 10 "Ice Machine" – Depeche Mode cover (1991) Energy Rekords
- Virtual X-mas 92 – CD track No. 5 "White Christmas" (1992) Energy Rekords
- Technopolis Vol. VII – CD track No. 8 "Never Trust a Klingon (Gravity Version)" (1992) Back In Black – Unofficial Release
- To Be Stun – CD track No. 8 "E-lectric" (1993) Rayher Disc
- Moonraker – 2xCD disc No. 2 track No. 7 "Never Trust a Klingon" (1994) Sub Terranean
- Virtual Energy – Volume Two – CD track No. 6 "Beam Me Up (Transporter Mix)" (1994) Energy Rekords
- Virtual X-mas 94 – CD track No. 1f "Never Trust a Klingon", No. 1g "E-lectric" and No. 1h "Strange Dimensions" (1994) Energy Rekords
- To Cut A Long Story Short – A Tribute to the Pioneers of Electronic Pop – CD track No. 2 "Planet Earth" (1995) Energy Rekords
- Energy Rekords & Beat That! Records 1996 – CD track No. 9 "Astrogirl (Original)" and No. 10 "Trouble With Tribbles" (1996) Energy Rekords
- Popnation – Best of Blekingska Nationen 1994-1996 – CD track No. 19 "Astrogirl" (1996) Beat That!
- Electric Ballroom – 2xCD disc No. 2 track No. 5 "Stranged (Limited Version)" (1997) Sub Terranean
- Neurostyle Vol. VII – CD track No. 6 "Not Human" (1997) Sub Terranean
- Sauna – Hösten 1997 – CD track No. 6 "Not Human" (1997) Suana Magazine
- Sound-Line Vol. 6 – CD track No. 12 "E.T. Phone Home" (1997) Side-Line
- A RefleXion of Synthpop Volume 1 – CD track No. 2 "Human Decision Required (Re-Edit) " (1998) Maschinenwelt Records
- Best of Electronic Music – 2xCD Ltd. Edition disc No. 1 track No. 7 "Dr. McCoy" (1998) TCM Musikproduktionsgesellschaft mbH
- Binary Application Extension 05 – CD track No. 15 "Force of Life" (1998) Genocide Project
- Deejay Tribe – 2xCD disc No. 2 track No. 9 "Speed of Light" (1998) Credo
- We Came to Watch Part 1 – VHS "E.T. Phone Home" (1998) Credo/Nova Tekk
- EBM Club Classics – 2xCD disc No. 2 track No. 6 "Never Trust a Klingon (A Version)" (1998) Synthetic Symphony
- Pleasure & Pain Volume One – CD track No. 3 "Alien Attack" and track No. 10 "All the Children Shall Lead" (1998) TCM Musikproduktionsgesellschaft mbH
- Public Communication 1 – CD track No. 3 "Spacewalk" (1998) SubSpace Communications
- Strange Love 2 – CD track No. 13 "Speed of Light" (1998) Orkus
- Best of Electronic Music Vol. 2 – 2xCD disc No. 1 track No. 12 "Never Trust a Klingon (Mox Epoques Federation Mix)" (1999) TCM Musikproduktionsgesellschaft mbH
- Dion Fortune Sampler Vol. VI – CD track No. 17 "E.T. Phone Home" Dion Fortune
- Elegy – Numéro 4 – CD track No. 5 "E.T. Phone Home (Live)" (1999) Dion Fortune
- Wellenreiter In Schwarz Vol. 3 – 2xCD disc No. 1 track No. 13 "Dr. McCoy (Synchronisiert)" (1999) Credo/Nova Tekk
- World of Synthpop – 2xCD disc No. 2 track No. 1 "Spacewalk" (1999) Sterntaler/Zoomshot Media Entertainment
- Xtra Compilation II – 2xCD disc No. 1 track No. 6 "Spacewalk" (1999) Angelwings
- Zillo Club Hits – CD track No. 13 "Dr. McCoy (Classic Version)" (1999) Zillo
- Zillo Festival Sampler 1999 – 2xCD disc No. 2 track No. 8 "Out There" (1999) Zillo
- ZilloScope: New Signs & Sounds 04/99 – CD track No. 7 "Star Pilot On Channel K" (1999) Zillo
- Cover Classics Volume Two – CD track No. 4 "I Don't Know What It Is" – Pete Shelly cover (2000) VISION Records
- Cyberl@b V2.0 – 2xCD disc No. 1 track No. 7 "Dr. McCoy (Classic)" (2000) Matrix Cube
- Electro Club Attack – Shot Three – 2xCD disc No. 2 track No. 6 "Klingon 2000 (Danny B's Phaser House Cut)" (2000) XXC/Zoomshot Media Entertainment
- ElectroManiac Vol. 1 – CD track No. 4 "Out There" (2000) Bloodline
- Gothic Compilation Part XII – CD track No. 8 "Where Rockets Fly (Original Version)" (2000) Batbeliever Releases
- The Best of Loves – A Tribute to Depeche Mode – CD track No. 10 "Ice Machine" – Depeche Mode cover (2000) Energy Rekords
- World of Synthpop 2 – 2xCD disc No. 1 track No. 4 "Out There" (2000) Sterntaler
- Best of Electronic Music Vol. 3 – 2xCD disc No. 1 track No. 7 "Satellites (Sputnik Mix)" (2001) Bloodline
- Clubline Volume 2 – CD track No. 3 "Queen of Space (Stop Dave, I'm Going Crazy ...)" (2001) Bloodline
- Clubline Volume 3 – CD track No. 1 "Reactivated" (2001) Bloodline
- D-Side 2 – CD track No. 12 "Where Rockets Fly (Electromix)" (2001) D-Side
- Electro Club Attack – Shot Four – 2xCD disc No. 2 track No. 7 "Where Rockets Fly" (2001) XXC/Zoomshot Media Entertainment
- Euro Rock Fest VL 2001 – 2xCD disc No. 1 track No. 9 "Where Rockets Fly (Electromix)" (2001) Angelwings/Zoomshot Media Entertainment
- Ghosts from the Darkside Vol. 3 – 2xCD "Klingon 2000 (Radio Mix)" (2001) Purple Flower
- M'era Luna Festival 2001 – 2xCD disc No. 2 track No. 9 "Queen of Space (Stop Dave, I'm Going Crazy 2001)" (2001) Oblivion
- New Forms of Synthetic Pop V.2.0 – CD track No. 8 "Satellites" (2001) Bloodline
- Pleasure and Pain Volume Two – CD track#1 "I Don't Know What it Is" and track No. 9 "Star Pilot On Channel K" (2001) Bloodline
- PRGDA vs. SSC – CD track No. 1 "Astrogirl's Secret" (2001) SubSpace Communications
- Sonic Seducer Cold Hands Seduction Vol. XII – CD + VCD, video No. 9 "Take Me to the Stars" and video No. 10 "Interview" (2001) Sonic Seducer
- Strange Love 5 – CD track No. 12 "Satellites (Sputnik Mix)" (2001) Orkus
- Volume 6 – CD track No. 5 "Satellites (Single Version)" (2001) Prospective Music Magazine
- World of Synthpop 3 – 2xCD disc No. 1 track No. 5 "Reactivated" (2001) Sterntaler/Zoomshot Media Entertainment
- Zillo Club Hits 6 – CD track No. 11 "Queen of Space" (2001) Zillo
- Clubline Volume 1 – CD track No. 7 "Klingon 2000" (2002) Bloodline
- World of Synthpop 4 – 2xCD disc No. 1 track No. 4 "Babylon 5" (2002) Sterntaler/Zoomshot Media Entertainment
