= XXII Corps =

22 Corps, 22nd Corps, Twenty Second Corps, or XXII Corps may refer to:

== Germany ==
=== German Empire ===
- XXII Reserve Corps, Imperial German Army, World War I

=== Nazi Germany ===
- XXII Mountain Corps, Wehrmacht
- XXII Army Corps (Wehrmacht)

== Russia and Soviet Union ==
=== Russian Empire ===
- 22nd Army Corps (Russian Empire), Imperial Russian Army, 1905–1918

=== Soviet Union ===
- 22nd Rifle Corps
- 22nd Tank Corps

=== Russian Federation ===
- 22nd Army Corps (Russian Federation), Russian Army, 2017–present

== United Kingdom ==
- XXII Corps (United Kingdom)

=== Artillery Volunteer Corps ===
- 22nd (Church) Lancashire Artillery Volunteer Corps

=== Rifle Volunteer Corps ===
- 22nd (Staveley) Derbyshire Rifle Volunteer Corps
- 22nd (Tavistock) Devonshire Rifle Volunteer Corps
- 22nd (Liverpool Exchange) Lancashire Rifle Volunteer Corps
- 22nd (Central London Rangers) Middlesex Rifle Volunteer Corps
- 22nd (Queen's Westminster) Middlesex Rifle Volunteer Corps
- 22nd (Leeds) Yorkshire West Riding Rifle Volunteer Corps

== United States ==
- XXII Corps (Union Army), American Civil War
- XXII Corps (United States)

== Other countries ==
- XXII Army Corps (Italy)
- XXII Corps (Ottoman Empire), World War I

== See also ==
- List of military corps by number
- 22nd Army (disambiguation)
- 22nd Brigade (disambiguation)
- 22nd Division (disambiguation)
- 22nd Regiment (disambiguation)
- 22nd Squadron (disambiguation)
- 22nd Battalion (disambiguation)
- 22nd (disambiguation)
