= 22nd =

22nd is the ordinal form of the number 22. 22nd or twenty-second may also refer to:

- A fraction, 1/22, equal to one of 22 equal parts
- 22nd of the month, a recurring calendar date

== Geography ==
- 22nd meridian east, a line of longitude
- 22nd meridian west, a line of longitude
- 22nd parallel north, a circle of latitude
- 22nd parallel south, a circle of latitude
- 22nd Avenue
- 22nd Street (disambiguation)

== Military ==
- 22nd Army (disambiguation)
- 22nd Battalion (disambiguation)
- 22nd Division (disambiguation)
- 22nd Regiment (disambiguation)
- 22nd Squadron (disambiguation)

== Other ==
- Twenty-second Amendment (disambiguation)
  - Twenty-second Amendment to the United States Constitution
- 22nd century
- 22nd century BC
- 22nd Old Boys F.C., a football club in Northern Ireland

== See also ==
- 22 (disambiguation)
- 22nd century (disambiguation)
