= 22nd Army =

22nd Army may refer to:

- Twenty-Second Army (Japan)
- 22nd Army (Soviet Union)
- 22nd Guards Combined Arms Army, Russia

== See also ==
- List of armies by number
- XXII Corps (disambiguation)
- 22nd Division (disambiguation)
- 22nd Brigade (disambiguation)
- 22nd Regiment (disambiguation)
- 22nd Battalion (disambiguation)
- 22nd Squadron (disambiguation)
- 22nd (disambiguation)
