= 22nd Cavalry =

22nd Cavalry may refer to:

== Divisions ==
- 22nd Cavalry Division (Soviet Union)
- 22nd Cavalry Division (United States)
- 22nd SS Volunteer Cavalry Division

== Brigades ==
- 22nd Mounted Brigade

== Regiments and companies ==
- 22nd Cavalry Regiment (United States)
- 22nd Sam Browne's Cavalry (Frontier Force)
- 22nd (Cheshire) Company, Imperial Yeomanry
- 22nd (London) Armoured Car Company (Westminster Dragoons), Royal Tank Corps

=== American Civil War units ===
==== Union Army ====
- 22nd New York Cavalry Regiment
- 22nd Pennsylvania Cavalry Regiment

==== Confederate Army ====
- 22nd (Barteau's) Tennessee Cavalry Regiment
- 22nd Texas Cavalry Regiment
- 22nd Virginia Cavalry Regiment

== See also ==
- 22nd Division (disambiguation)
- 22nd Brigade (disambiguation)
- 22nd Regiment (disambiguation)
- 22nd (disambiguation)
