= Administrative centre =

Seat of regional administration or local government

The city of Yekaterinburg is the administrative centre of Sverdlovsk Federal Subject and Ural Federal District

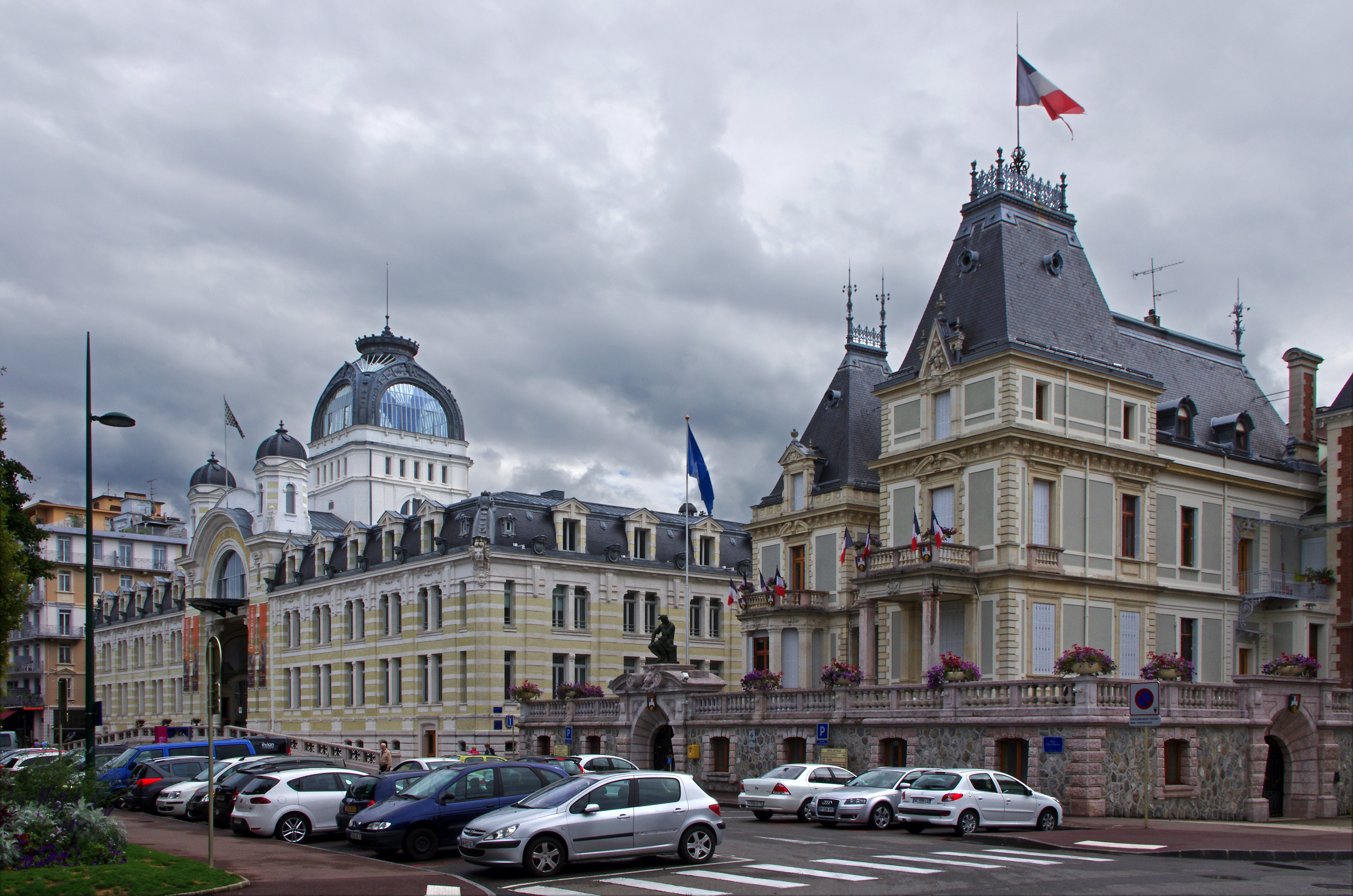
The commune of Évian-les-Bains is the administrative centre of the canton of Évian-les-Bains in Haute-Savoie, France.

An administrative centre is a seat of regional administration or local government, or a county seat or town, or the place where the central administration of a commune or equivalent subdivision, is located.

In countries with French as an administrative language, such as Belgium, Luxembourg, Switzerland and many African countries, a chef-lieu (French: [ʃɛfljø], pl. chefs-lieux, lit. 'chief place' or 'main place') is a town or city that is important from an administrative perspective.

== By country ==
=== Algeria ===
The capitals of Algerian provinces, districts, and communes are called chefs-lieux.

=== Belgium ===
The chef-lieu in Belgium is the administrative centre of each of the ten provinces of Belgium. Three of these cities also give their name to their province (Antwerp, Liège and Namur).

=== France ===
The chef-lieu of a French department is known as the prefecture (préfecture). This is the town or city where the prefect of the department (and all services under their control) are situated, in a building also known as the prefecture. In every French region, one of the departments has preeminence over the others, and the prefect carries the title of préfet de la région (lit. 'Prefect of the Region') or préfet du département (lit. 'Prefect of the Department') and the city where the regional prefect is found is known as the chef-lieu of the region. The services are, however, controlled by the prefecture of the department.

The chef-lieu of an arrondissement, commonly known as the sous-préfecture is the city or town where the sub-prefect of the arrondissement (and the services directly under their control) are situated, in a building called the sub-prefecture. The arrondissement where the department prefecture is located does not normally have a sub-prefect or sub-prefecture, the administration being devolved usually to the secretary-general of the departmental prefecture, who functions as sub-prefect for the arrondissement.

The chef-lieu of a canton is usually the biggest city or town within the canton, but has only a nominal role. No specific services are controlled by it. In past decades, there was always a gendarmerie, a treasurer and a justice of the peace.

==== New Caledonia ====
The chef-lieu indicates the principal city of the provinces of New Caledonia. So Nouméa is the chef-lieu of South Province. But the chef-lieu can also mean the principal area within a town. So Wé is part of the town of Lifou, but is the chef-lieu of Lifou. In the Loyalty Islands and the other islands, the name of the chef-lieu differs from that of the name of the town. For the towns of the mainland, the chef-lieu has the same name as the town. Nouméa is a town composed only of Nouméa.

=== Francophone West Africa ===
Many of the West African states which gained independence from France in the mid-20th century also inherited the French administrative structure of departments and communes, headed by a chef-lieu. States still using chef-lieu to identify the administrative headquarters of a government subdivision include Senegal, Burkina Faso, Benin, Mali, and Niger.

Taking Niger and Mali as examples, the administrative subdivisions down to the commune level each have a formal place of administrative headquarters, titled the chef-lieu. The larger portion of the terminology of administrative division is inherited from colonial rule as part of French West Africa, and has survived and been somewhat modified over time. In both nations there have been remarkably parallel histories. Since decentralization began in both nations in the 1990s, the chef-lieu transitioned from the location of the governor, commandant, or prefect and their staff to the location of the commune, cercle, department, and regional councils and a variety of decentralized bodies. The chef-lieu of a region, cercle or department is usually also a communal chef-lieu. Both nations also established a supreme council of local government authorities (Haut conseil des collectivités territoriales) seated at the nation's capital. Smaller subdivisions in Mali's communes (villages, tribal councils, and quarters) are administered from a place (lit. 'site'), so the chef-lieu is literally the 'chief-place' even at the lowest level.

=== Jordan ===
In Jordan, the administrative centres are known as chief towns or nahias. Nahias may be in charge of a sub-district (qda), a district (liwa), or a governorate (muhafazah).

=== Luxembourg ===
Luxembourg is divided into four electoral constituencies, twelve cantons, as well as 100 communes (Luxembourgish: Gemengen). Cantons have each a chef-lieu and are named after it. The same is true for each commune which is composed of more than one town or village. Usually, with a few exceptions, the commune is named after the communal chef-lieu.

=== Russia ===
In Russia, several million-plus cities in federal districts have the official status of an administrative centre: Moscow (as the main city of the Central Federal District), Vladivostok, Volgograd, Yekaterinburg, Nizhny Novgorod, Novosibirsk, Pyatigorsk, Rostov-on-Don and St. Petersburg. The main cities of regions and municipal districts are also called unofficially the administrative centre or simply the centre. The only exception to this rule is the republics, for which the term "capital" is used to refer to the seat of government. The capital of Russia is also an entity to which the term "administrative centre" does not apply.

=== Sweden ===
In Sweden there are two levels of administrative centre; the local municipal and the regional county.

==== Central locality ====
Central locality (Swedish: centralort) is a term commonly ascribed to the settlement that serves as a municipal administrative centre. This level handles the local administrative and political tasks of the surrounding settlements. Since central place theory was the guiding principle during the 1962–1977 municipal reform, most municipalities were dominated by a larger urban area where the political seat was located. Most municipalities are named for their central locality, but there are several exceptions.

There are many deviations from the central locality principle. Some municipalities are dominated by two or more towns of similar size, and sometimes they share the municipal administration, with the municipality having its official address in one of the towns. For example, both Skillingaryd and Vaggeryd are central localities of Vaggeryd Municipality. Conversely, there are municipalities within metropolitan areas. For example, there are twenty-six municipalities within the Stockholm metropolitan area. The term "central locality" has no legal meaning and it is unclear how it should be applied to these municipalities. Some municipalities appointing one or several localities to be the central locality.

==== Residence city ====
A residence city (Swedish: residensstad) is the town or city which is the political and administrative seat of the county. This level handles the more regional political and administrative tasks of the county, such as healthcare and public transport. The name comes from these towns or cities being where the governor (landshövding) resides.

=== Switzerland ===
The term chef-lieu is applied to the capital of each Swiss canton. In 16 of the 26 cantons, the territory is subdivided into districts. Every district's capital is also termed a chef-lieu and each has a prefect.

=== Tunisia ===
The term chef-lieu is used to designate the capital of each governorate of Tunisia. Each of the 24 governorates is subdivided into delegations which each have a central city as the chef-lieu of the delegation.

=== United Kingdom ===
In the United Kingdom, an administrative centre is the centre of a local authority, which is distinct from the county town of a historic county. For example, the administrative centre where the county council of Lancashire sits is Preston, even though the county town is Lancaster.

== See also ==
- County seat – Administrative center for a county or civil parish
- County town – County administrative centre
- Local government
- Seat of government
