= Gösta Wetterhall =

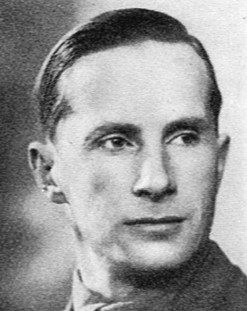
- Överstelöjtnant Gösta Wetterhall
- Born: Gösta Carl Fredrik Wetterhall; 1 August 1904; Skillingaryd, Sweden
- Died: 22 June 1983 (aged 78); Falun, Sweden
- Military career
- Allegiance: Sweden
- Branch: Swedish Army
- Service years: 1925–1967
- Rank: Colonel
- Units: Swedish Volunteer Corps; Norrbotten Regiment; Dalarna Regiment
- Commands: 16th Ranger Company; Army Ranger School; Falun Defence District
- Conflicts: Winter War; Operation Sepals

Gösta Carl Fredrik Wetterhall (1 August 1904 – 22 June 1983) was a Swedish Army officer. During World War II, he served in Finland during the Winter War. Back in Sweden as commanding officer of the Army Ranger School in Kiruna, he was responsible for the Swedish military's relationship with the Norwegian resistance and made major contributions to them through active support to the Norwegian bases on the Swedish side in what was called Operation Sepals. After the war, Wetterhall eventually became commanding officer of Falun Defense District and worked as a ski competition administrator.

== Early life ==
Wetterhall was born on 1 August 1904 in Skillingaryd, Sweden, the son of Lieutenant Colonel Carl Fredrik Wetterhall and his wife Emy Karin (née Wallin). He passed studentexamen in Jönköping in 1923.

== Career ==
In 1923, Wetterhall was commissioned as an officer and was assigned to Norrbotten Regiment (I 19) the same year as an officer aspirant. Wetterhall became a second lieutenant in Norrbotten Regiment on 31 December 1925. Wetterhall was promoted to underlöjtnant on 1 January 1928 and to lieutenant on 1 May 1929 and studied at the Royal Central Gymnastics Institute in 1930. He served as assistant teacher at the Swedish Infantry Combat School from 1933 to 1934 and attended the Royal Swedish Army Staff College from 1936 to 1938.

Wetterhall was promoted to captain on 1 October 1937 and was teacher at the Royal Military Academy from 1938 to 1943. He was commander of the 16th Ranger Company in the Swedish Volunteer Corps during the Winter War in Finland in 1940. Back in Sweden, Wetterhall was promoted to major and was appointed as the first commanding officer of the Army Ranger School in Kiruna on 1 April 1944. Wetterhall served at the Norway–Sweden border during World War II. He made sure that an allied border base in the Lapland mountains south of the border were provided with support from the ranger battalion of the Army Ranger School. This with ammunition, intelligence on German troop movements and arduous transports. Wetterhall also wanted to cross the Norway–Sweden border with 200 men to fight the Germans in Narvik. His company was stopped by the Swedish government.

Wetterhall then became major and battalion commander in Dalarna Regiment (I 13) on 1 May 1948. He was promoted to lieutenant colonel on 1 October 1951 with placement as training officer. He took an early retirement on 1 November 1955 and was at the same time placed in the reserve and promoted to colonel and appointed commander of Falun Defence District. Wetterhall studied at the Swedish National Defence College in 1959 and he left the position as Defence District Commander on 1 October 1967. He withdrew from the reserve in 1973.

== Other work ==
Wetterhall was a vigorous sportsman and an experienced competition organizer. As a young man, he belonged to the elite of Swedish modern pentathlon and became military pistol champion in 1958. Wetterhall was also at an old age a good skier and marksman. He was used to lead major skiing competitions in cross-country skiing; including the Swedish Cross-Country Skiing Championships in Kiruna in 1948 and the FIS Nordic World Ski Championships 1954 and the FIS Nordic World Ski Championships 1974. At the age of 68, he personally led by hiking and skiing, the construction of tracks for the latter competition. As a board member of the Ski Alliance (Skidalliansen) and chairman of Dalarna Ski Association, Wetterhall seemed to that the Swedish Ski Games in Falun became a reality and he led the tracks construction of the Ski Games as long as he could.

Wetterhall was chairman of the Society for the Promotion of Ski Sport and Open Air Life's regional association in Dalarna (Skid- och friluftsfrämjandets landskapsförbund i Dalarna) from 1955 to 1960 and of the Board of Dalarna's Shooting Federation (Dalarnas skytteförbunds styrelse) from 1957 to 1969. He was vice chairman of Dalarnas pistolskyttekrets from 1957 to 1963, Falun City Sports Board (Falu stads idrottsstyrelse) from 1955 to 1963, chairman of Dalarna Ski Association in 1967 and member of executive committee of Skytteöverstyrelsen from 1970 to 1972.

== Personal life ==
On 19 December 1934 he married gymnastics director and physiotherapist Barbro Emma Helena Hasselblad (13 January 1909 in Stockholm – 19 February 1990 in Falun), the daughter of the war councillor (krigsråd) at the Royal Swedish Army Materiel Administration Sven Åke Waldemar Hasselblad and Elsa (née Nordström). He was the father of Gunilla (born 15 April 1936), Åke Carl Gustaf (20 September 1938), Karin (born 2 June 1941), Anna (born 4 June 1943) and Carl (born 17 November 1947).

== Death ==
Wetterhall died on 22 June 1983 in Falun and was buried Skogskyrkogården in Falun.

== Dates of rank ==
- 1925 – Second lieutenant
- 1928 – Underlöjtnant
- 1929 – Lieutenant
- 1937 – Captain
- 1944 – Major
- 1951 – Lieutenant colonel
- 1955 – Colonel

== Awards and decorations ==
=== Swedish ===
- (Sweden) Commander 1st Class of the Order of the Sword (11 November 1966)
- (Sweden) Knight of the Order of the Sword
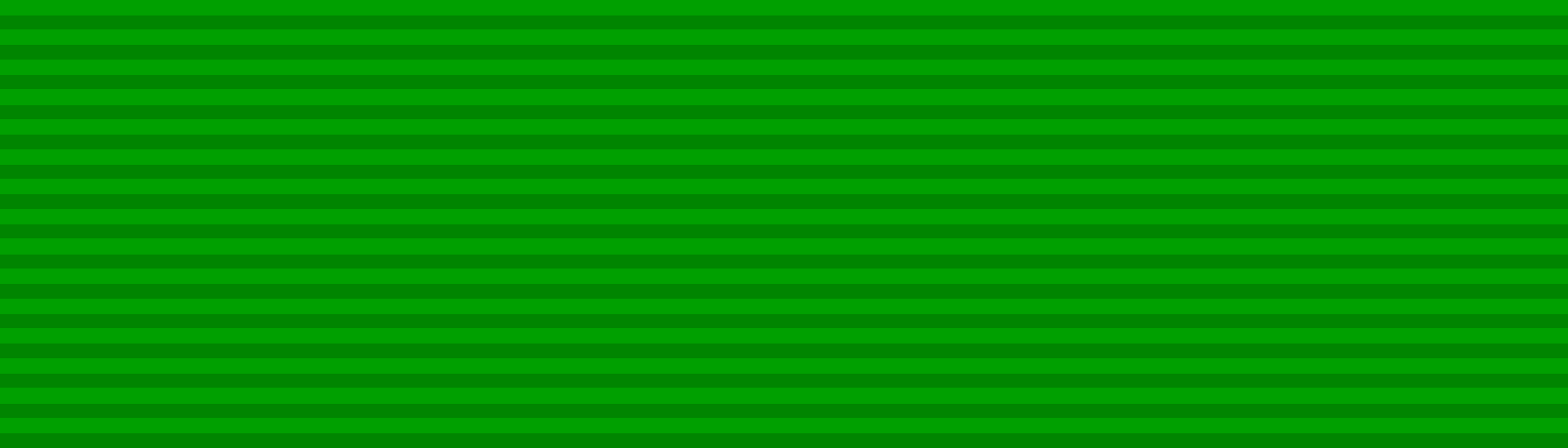
- (Sweden) Knight of the Order of Vasa
- (Sweden) Home Guard Medal of Merit in Gold (6 June 1960)
- (Sweden) Swedish Pistol Shooting Federation Medal of Merit in silver

=== Foreign ===
- (Finland) 4th Class of the Order of the Cross of Liberty with Swords
- (Norway) King Haakon VII Freedom Medal
- (Finland) Finnish War Memorial Medal

== Bibliography ==
- Wetterhall, Gösta (1983). "Bättre spår med Aktiv: handbok för spårläggning" [Better track with Aktiv: Handbook for track laying] (in Swedish) (New ed.). Östersund: Aktiv maskin AB. SELIBR 467085.
