= Hook Ladies Open =

Tournament information
- Location: Hok, Sweden
- Established: 1986
- Course: Hook Golf Club
- Tour: Swedish Golf Tour
- Format: 54-hole stroke play
- Prize fund: SEK 200,000
- Final year: 1998

Tournament record score
- Aggregate: 208 Åsa Gottmo (1997)
- To par: −8 as above

Final champion
- (Sweden) Jessica Lindbergh

The Hook Ladies Open was a women's professional golf tournament on the Swedish Golf Tour played between 1986 and 1998. It was always held at the Hook Golf Club in Hok, Sweden.

== Winners ==
Year	Winner	Score	Margin of victory	Runner(s)-up	Prize fund (SEK)	Ref
Hook Ladies Open
1998	(Sweden) Jessica Lindbergh (a)	211 (–5)	Playoff	(Finland) Riikka Hakkarainen (Sweden) Marlene Hedblom (Sweden) Sophie Gustafson	200,000	
1997	(Sweden) Åsa Gottmo	208 (–8)	6 strokes	(Sweden) Mia Löjdahl	200,000	
1987–1996: No tournament
Hook Pro-Am
1986	(Sweden) Pia Nilsson	155 (+11)	Playoff	(Sweden) Viveca Hoff (Sweden) Malin Landehag	50,000	
