= NS22 =

NS22, NS 22, NS-22, NS.22, or variation, may refer to:

== Places ==
- Orchard MRT station (station code: NS22), ION Orchard, Singapore; a mass transit station
- Eastern Shore (electoral district) (constituency N.S. 22), Nova Scotia, Canada; a provincial electoral district

== Other uses ==
- New Penguin Shakespeare volume 22
- Blue Origin NS-22 (4 August 2022), a passenger suborbital spaceflight by the New Shepard
- White Pass NS #22, a railcar; see List of White Pass and Yukon Route locomotives and cars

== See also ==
- NS (disambiguation)
- 22 (disambiguation)
