= 22nd Division =

22nd Division or 22nd Infantry Division may refer to:

== Infantry divisions ==
- 22nd Division (People's Republic of China)
- 22nd Infantry Division (France)
- 22nd Division (German Empire)
- 22nd Landwehr Division, German Empire
- 22nd Reserve Division, German Empire
- 22nd Infantry Division "Cacciatori delle Alpi", Italy
- 22nd Division (Imperial Japanese Army)
- 22nd Mountain Infantry Division, Poland
- 22nd Infantry Division (Philippines)
- 22nd Infantry Division (Russian Empire)
- 22nd Infantry Division (South Korea)
- 22nd Division (South Vietnam)
- 22nd Division (Spain)
- 22nd Guards Rifle Division, Soviet Union
- 22nd Mechanised Division, Soviet Union
- 22nd Motor Rifle Division, Soviet Union
- 22nd Motor Rifle Division "Atamyrat Niyazov", Soviet Union
- 22nd Motor Rifle Division NKVD, Soviet Union
- 22nd Division (United Kingdom)
- 22nd Division (Yugoslav Partisans)

== Airborne divisions ==
- 22nd Air Landing Division, German unit in World War II

== Cavalry divisions ==
- 22nd Cavalry Division (United States)
- 22nd SS Volunteer Cavalry Division, German unit in World War II

== Armoured divisions ==
- 22nd Panzer Division, German unit in World War II
- 22nd Guards Tank Division, Soviet Union
- 22nd Tank Division (Soviet Union)
- 22nd Armored Division (United States)

== Artillery divisions ==
- 22nd Anti-Aircraft Artillery Division, Soviet Union
- 22nd Breakthrough Artillery Division, Soviet Union

== Aviation divisions ==
- 22nd Strategic Aerospace Division, United States
- 22nd Guards Heavy Bomber Aviation Division, Soviet Union

== See also ==
- List of military divisions by number
- 22nd Army (disambiguation)
- 22nd Brigade (disambiguation)
- 22nd Regiment (disambiguation)
- 22nd Battalion (disambiguation)
- 22nd Squadron (disambiguation)
