= 022 =

022 may refer to:

- Leduc 022, a French prototype aircraft
- Tyrrell 022, a Formula One racing car

== See also ==
- 22 (disambiguation)
