= 22nd Street station =

22nd Street station may refer to:

- 22nd Street station (Caltrain), a small commuter rail station in San Francisco, California
- 22nd Street station (Hudson–Bergen Light Rail), a light rail station in New Jersey
- 22nd Street station (SEPTA), a tram station in Center City, Philadelphia
- 22nd Street station (SkyTrain), an Expo Line station in New Westminster, near Vancouver, Canada
- Church and 22nd Street station, a station on the San Francisco Municipal Railway light rail network's J Church line

== See also ==
- 22nd Street (disambiguation)
