= Vaggeryd Municipality =

Vaggeryd Municipality Vaggeryds kommun
- Municipality
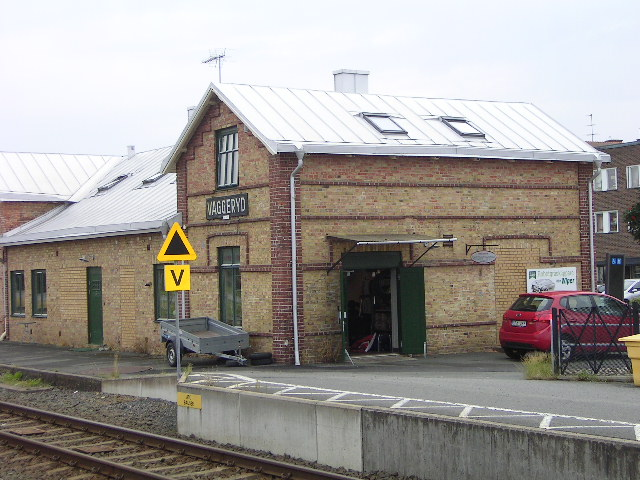
- Vaggeryd Train Station

- Coat of arms

- Coordinates: 57°30′N 14°07′E
- Country: Sweden
- County: Jönköping County
- Seat: Skillingaryd and Vaggeryd

Area
  - Total: 858.15 km^{2} (331.33 sq mi)
  - Land: 824.94 km^{2} (318.51 sq mi)
  - Water: 33.21 km^{2} (12.82 sq mi)
- Area as of 1 January 2014.

Population (30 June 2025)
  - Total: 14,899
  - Density: 18.061/km^{2} (46.777/sq mi)
- Time zone: UTC+1 (CET)
  - Summer (DST): UTC+2 (CEST)
- ISO 3166 code: SE
- Province: Småland
- Municipal code: 0665
- Website: www.vaggeryd.se

Vaggeryd Municipality (Swedish: Vaggeryds kommun) is a municipality in Jönköping County in southern Sweden. The town Skillingaryd is together with Vaggeryd the seat of the municipality. Most of the municipal administration is, however, placed in Skillingaryd.

The present municipality was created in 1971, when the two market towns Skillingaryd and Vaggeryd were amalgamated with parts of the rural municipalities of Klevshult and Vrigstad.

The large nature reserve Stora Mosse stretches in this municipality and the adjacent Gnosjö Municipality; in total it covers some 100 square kilometres (39 sq mi), whereof 77 square kilometres (30 sq mi) has been marked as nature reserve. A lot of the ground is boggy grounds and swamps which makes it important for different kinds of birds and other animals. It is easily accessible by car, guided tours are regularly conducted, and the total walking road adds up to 50 km.

In the area, iron has been processed since the Iron Age. It continued into the Middle Ages, and was very important for the inhabitants well into the 19th century.

In the municipality is also the horse track Vaggerydstravet located, with full rights for betting. A good supply of the natural resources: iron, wood and water, and good communications with larger cities around the province made Vaggeryd a centre for many industries of various kind. A chair manufacturer established itself in the small town of Hagsfors in the 1863, producing the Windsor chair that since has become a standard furniture in Sweden and soon found a market in England.

More wood and carpentry industry sprung out during the 19th century. Manufacturing of different travelling equipages was important, and transportations and communication with other parts of the province were important, and so the wheel came to symbolize the thinking of the municipality. It is manifested in the coat of arms.

Other industries related to the resources are paper manufacturing and pulp mills. While nowadays, tourism makes up an important part of its industry.

Recently, the "Vaggeryd model" has been thought up by some locals and has since been adapted by some 30 other municipalities of Sweden. Its purpose is to create bridges between industries.

== Localities ==
There are 4 urban areas (also called a Tätort or locality) in Vaggeryd Municipality.

In the table the localities are listed according to the size of the population as of December 31, 2005. The municipal seat is in bold characters.

#	Locality	Population
1	Vaggeryd	4,688
2	**Skillingaryd**	3,808
3	Hok	643
4	Klevshult	271

== Demographics ==
This is a demographic table based on Vaggeryd Municipality's electoral districts in the 2022 Swedish general election sourced from SVT's election platform, in turn taken from SCB official statistics.

Residents include everyone registered as living in the district, regardless of age or citizenship status. Valid voters indicate Swedish citizens above the age of 18 who therefore can vote in general elections. Left vote and right vote indicate the result between the two major blocs in said district in the 2022 general election. Employment indicates the share of people between the ages of 20 and 64 who are working taxpayers. Foreign background is defined as residents either born abroad or with two parents born outside of Sweden. Median income is the received monthly income through either employment, capital gains or social grants for the median adult above 20, also including pensioners in Swedish kronor. The section about college graduates indicates any degree accumulated after high school.

In total there were 14,735 inhabitants, including 10,637 Swedish citizens of voting age. 43.2% voted for the left coalition and 55.2% for the right coalition.

Location	Residents	Valid voters	Left vote	Right vote	Employed	SV parents	1st/2nd gen	Income	College
Location			%	%	%	%	%		%
Byarum-Bondstorp	1,410	1,065	33.3	65.3	91	93	7	28,743	32
Hok-Svenarum	1,324	955	33.4	65.5	85	88	12	27,037	33
Skillingaryd Ö	2,368	1,687	50.4	47.8	77	58	42	23,570	25
Vaggeryd N	2,109	1,527	47.2	51.0	85	71	29	25,752	30
Vaggeryd V	1,524	1,079	45.3	53.6	92	85	15	30,256	42
Vaggeryd Ö	2,285	1,657	51.6	46.5	82	74	26	23,590	32
V Skillingaryd-Tofteryd	2,480	1,772	40.3	58.4	87	79	21	27,838	36
Åker-Hagshult	1,235	895	34.6	63.4	86	85	15	25,933	33
Source: SVT
