= Twenty-second of the month =

Recurring ordinal calendar date

The twenty-second of the month or twenty-second day of the month is the recurring calendar date position corresponding to the day numbered 22 of each month. In the Gregorian calendar (and other calendars that number days sequentially within a month), this day occurs in every month of the year, and therefore occurs twelve times per year.

- Twenty-second of January
- Twenty-second of February
- Twenty-second of March
- Twenty-second of April
- Twenty-second of May
- Twenty-second of June
- Twenty-second of July
- Twenty-second of August
- Twenty-second of September
- Twenty-second of October
- Twenty-second of November
- Twenty-second of December

In addition to these dates, this date occurs in months of many other calendars, such as the Bengali calendar and the Hebrew calendar.

== See also ==
- 22nd (disambiguation)
