= 22nd Battalion =

22nd Battalion may refer to:

- 22nd Battalion (Australia), a World War I ANZAC battalion
- 2/22nd Battalion (Australia), a World War II Australian infantry battalion
- 22nd Battalion (New Zealand), a World War II New Zealand infantry battalion
- 22nd Battalion (French Canadian), CEF, a World War I battalion that formed part of the Canadian Corps
- 22nd Peacekeeping Battalion (Moldova)
- 22nd Chemical Battalion (United States)
- 22nd (County of London) Battalion (The Queen's)
- 22nd Virginia Infantry Battalion
- 22nd Motorized Infantry Battalion (Ukraine)

== See also ==
- XXII Corps (disambiguation)
- 22nd Division (disambiguation)
- 22nd Brigade (disambiguation)
- 22nd Regiment (disambiguation)
