= 23rd Division (People's Republic of China) =

23rd Division (1949)
- Active: 1949.1 - 1949.11
- Country: People's Republic of China
- Branch: People's Liberation Army
- Type: Division
- Role: Infantry
- Part of: 8th Corps
- Engagements: Chinese Civil War

The 23rd Division(Chinese: 第23师) was created In January 1949 under the Regulation of the Redesignations of All Organizations and Units of the Army, issued by Central Military Commission on November 1, 1948. It was formed from the 14th Independent Brigade, 8th Column of PLA Northwestern Field Army. Its history can be traced to the 14th Independent Brigade of the Jinsui Military District which was established in September 1948.

The division is part of 8th Corps. Under the flag of 23rd division it took part in the Chinese Civil War.

In November 1949 the division was inactivated and absorbed by 22nd Division.

As of disbandment division was composed of:

- 67th Regiment;
- 68th Regiment;
- 69th Regiment.
