= Percy Martin =

British engineer and automobile manufacturer

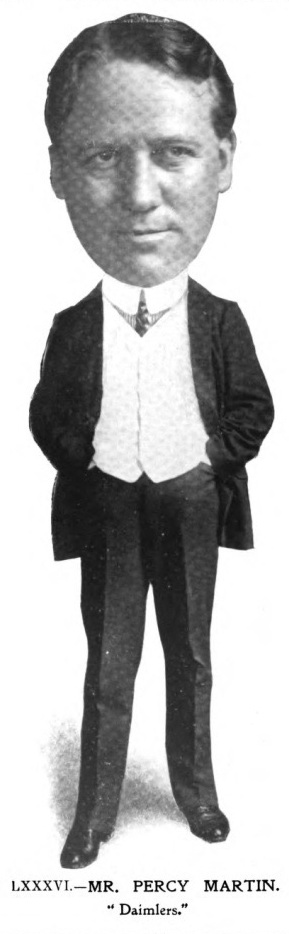
Percy Martin 1911

Percy Martin (1871–1958) was an American-born British engineer and automobile manufacturer. Born in Columbus, Ohio 19 June 1871 he obtained a degree in mechanical engineering, specializing in electrical engineering, from Ohio State University in 1892.

== General Electric ==
He worked for General Electric in Milan and Berlin then in 1901 on holiday in England and through a chance meeting he was asked to take up the works manager's position at the Daimler Company in Coventry which he did in October 1901.

The following July he married Alice Helen Heublein from Hartford, Connecticut, they had a son and a daughter.

== Daimler ==
Soon rationalising Daimler's range of 10 different models he promptly designed then completed the entry into production of two new cars, Daimler's 22 hp and 12 hp. He established improved incentive payments and improved the management of Daimler's design, operations and materials.

== Daimler and B.S.A. ==
On the merging of the businesses of Daimler and arms and munitions manufacturer Birmingham Small Arms Company in October 1910 Percy Martin took up the position of managing director of the combined enterprise. He was to serve more than twenty years in that post.

World War I

In December 1916 he was appointed Controller of Internal Combustion Engines by the Ministry of Munitions and to The Air Board where he represented the Ministry of Munitions.

Airco

In January 1920 B.S.A., on Martin's say so, bought from George Holt Thomas his aircraft business, Airco. In wartime Airco had been producing new aircraft at the rate of one every 45 minutes. The B.S.A. board made the purchase presuming Martin had carried out a due diligence investigation which he hadn't. The Airco companies were on the brink of financial collapse. Though they were closed immediately the losses were so grievous that B.S.A., one of the nation's major industrial combines, was obliged to miss paying a dividend for four years.

Retirement

At the beginning of the 1930s there were boardroom disagreements, a new chairman and, only technically subject to his direction, new executives covering much of his area of responsibility. Martin remained with B.S.A. and its subsidiary Daimler until his retirement from day-to-day responsibilities in April 1934 at a time when in spite of the Great Depression B.S.A. still directly employed more than 11,000 people. He was appointed chairman of Daimler. He gave up his seat on the B.S.A. board after one more year.

=== Sleeve valves and Daimler's fluid flywheel ===
Percy Martin was particularly involved in two successful technical developments, the development and introduction in 1908 of sleeve valves for Daimler's engines and, in 1930, their fluid flywheel fitted to all their vehicles in conjunction with Wilsons epicyclic gearboxes and a forerunner of automatic transmissions.

== Death ==
After retirement Martin remained in England living at Kenilworth near Coventry where he died in November 1958 a few months after his wife.
