= Klevshult =

- Location within Jönköping Location within Sweden Location within European Union
- Coordinates: 57°21′N 14°05′E
- Country: Sweden
- Province: Småland
- County: Jönköping County
- Municipality: Vaggeryd Municipality

Area
  - Total: 0.56 km^{2} (0.22 sq mi)

Population (31 December 2010)
  - Total: 264
  - Density: 468/km^{2} (1,210/sq mi)
- Time zone: UTC+1 (CET)
  - Summer (DST): UTC+2 (CEST)
- Climate: Cfb

Klevshult is a locality situated in Vaggeryd Municipality, Jönköping County, Sweden with 264 inhabitants in 2010.
