= Army Ranger School =

Swedish Army unit

- Arméns jägarskola
- Active: 1945–1975
- Country: Sweden
- Allegiance: Swedish Armed Forces
- Branch: Swedish Army
- Type: Ranger
- Size: Battalion
- Part of: Kiruna Defence District (1945–1955); VI Military District (1955–1966); Upper Norrland Military District (1966–1975)
- Garrison/HQ: Kiruna
- March: "Friska tag" (Modéer) (Note: The march was established in 1962 by Army Order 418/1962. It was taken over in 1975 by the Lapland Ranger Regiment, and is used since 2000 by the Lappland Ranger Group (Lapplandsjägargruppen).)

Insignia
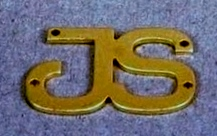
- Unit insignia m/1952

The Swedish Army Ranger School (Swedish: Arméns jägarskola, JS) was a Swedish Army ranger unit which was active in various forms between 1910 and 1975. The unit was based in Kiruna, Lapland.

== History ==
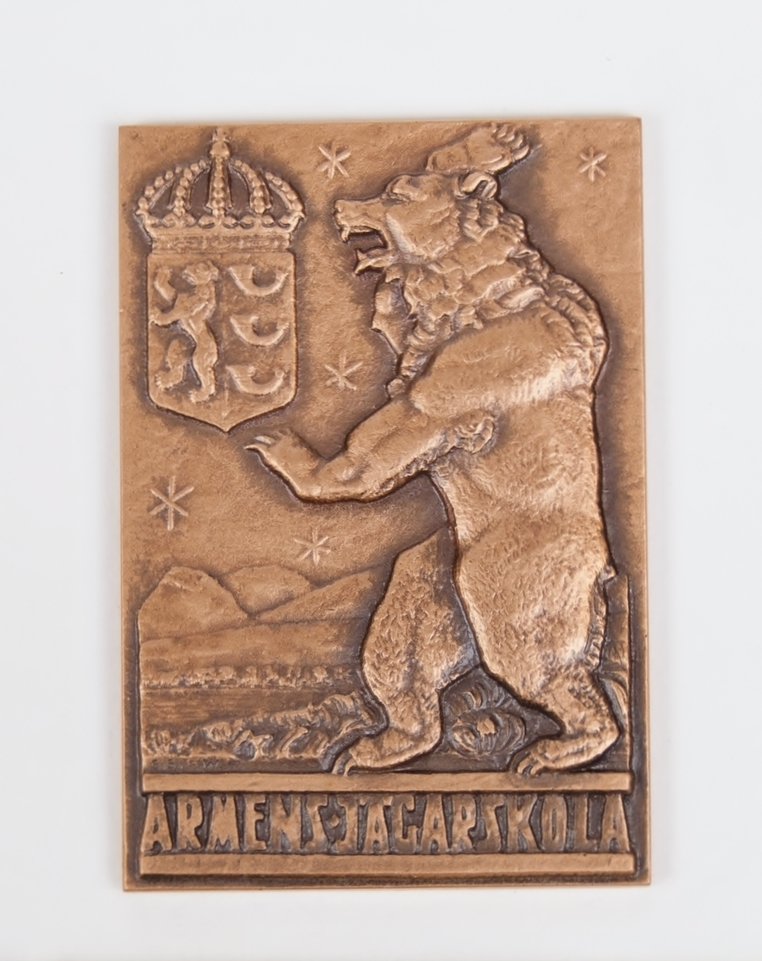
Plaque in bronze for the Army Ranger School.

The Army Ranger School has its origins in the Ski Battalion which in 1910 was established in Boden as Norrbotten Regiment's 4th battalion. 372 conscripts from Sweden's then 25 enrollment areas enrolled in Boden for training in winter conditions. The Ski Battalion remained until 1943, when the Norrbotten Regiment's Ranger Battalion in Kiruna (Norrbottens regementes jägarbataljon i Kiruna, I 19 K) was raised. After the German invasion of Norway on 9 April 1940 the Ski Battalion operated in the fell areas along the Norway–Sweden border as well as the subsequent Ranger Battalion did until the end of the war. One of the soldiers who served in the Ski Battalion during World War II was Sweden's future Supreme Commander Stig Synnergren.

The class of 1945, which formed the 4th Ranger Battalion at the Norrbotten Regiment (I 19) enrolled in Boden. After transportation by rail the battalion moved on 14 June into not completely finished new barracks in Kiruna. Thus the I 19's Ski Battalion was reorganized into the Army Ranger School (JS). The unit was formally established on 1 July. It had the same commanding officer as Kiruna Defence District (Fo 66). On 1 February 1946, the school's designation was adjusted to JS. In 1955, the school's staff were separated from the defense district, and thus received its own commander.

The duties of the Army Ranger School was to train soldiers and officers in winter and ranger (jägar) duty for the army. Approximately 400-500 men were distributed in two companies. The officers were recruited from across the country with a three-year active duty tour. Then they could pass on the knowledge to their home units on how to act in a subarctic environment of an area as big as Switzerland. Although the military training was important and largely based on secure winter conditions, the main reason for the Army Ranger School being placed in Malmfälten was that it would defend the valuable mines.

The Lapland Ranger Regiment (I 22/Fo 66) was organized on 1 July 1975 through merger of Kiruna Defense District Staff (Fo 66) and the Army Ranger School (JS). The regiment was disbanded in 2000.

== Training ==
The training over the years followed basically the same schedule. The squad leaders enrolled in May and the privates a month later. During the summer, basic military training was conducted which also included march training with heavier kit and gradually longer distances. In early autumn, mountain march was conducted and after 1960, when the green beret was introduced, the completed march was crowned with a ceremony where the field cap was replaced with the beret. This was the proof that one had shown the right skills as a ranger and had become tough enough to withstand a long time under primitive conditions.

During autumn the training continued with group exercises and a basic winter training where one learned the basics of combat and survival in winter. There the skis was the basis of everything. To move long distances, pulling snow sleds, bury themselves in the snow bivouacs, shoot and dress properly. Also mountaineering was included. The last few months consisted of combat and intelligence training in the platoon and company. The soldiers spent days or a week in the field, then recovered and then went out in the field again. Everything ended with the joint exercise of the military district.

The team sections (anspannstropparna) with horses and even tractors were used until the early 1960s. Then the first all-terrain vehicles were taken in use, Bandvagn 202 which in the 1980s were replaced with Bandvagn 206. Also snowmobiles were introduced extensively which improved mobility during the winter. The armament consisted in the beginning of semi-automatic rifles and submachine guns. These were later replaced with assault rifles, first the 7.62NATO Automatkarbin 4 and then 5.56NATO Automatkarbin 5. Then the RBS 56 BILL and 8 cm mortars were added which were included in each ranger company. For the soldiers, it was mine training, ranger combat, survival, sabotage, reconnaissance, close air support training and more. Winter lasted 7–8 months of the year with an average annual temperature of -1.2 degrees. Before being accepted to the unit, one had to do physical and psychological tests to 'separate the wheat from the chaff'. One had to meet the requirements of the military unit class 1A (förbandsklass 1A).

== Commanding officers ==
- 1944–1948: Gösta Wetterhall
- 1948–1952: Erik Lundholm
- 1952–1957: Bengt Olof Brodin
- 1962–1965: Jens Emil Alfred Bögvad (Note: Lieutenant colonel Bögvad died in Sinai during transport to a field hospital on 16 July 1970, after being hit by Egyptian fire at the observation post Op Blue.)
- 1965–1966: Olof Gunnar Dackenberg
- 1966–1973: Åke Clarence Jonsson
- 1973–1975: Erik Olof Forsgren

== Names, designations and locations ==
Name	Translation	From		To
Arméns jägarskola	[Swedish] Army Ranger School	1945-07-01	–	1975-06-30
Designation		From		To
AJS		1945-07-01	–	1946-01-31
JS		1946-02-01	–	1975-06-30
Location		From		To
Kiruna Garrison		1945-07-01	–	1975-06-30
