= Hok, Sweden =

Hok
- Location within Jönköping Location within Sweden Location within European Union
- Coordinates: 57°31′N 14°16′E
- Country: Sweden
- Province: Småland
- County: Jönköping County
- Municipality: Vaggeryd Municipality

Area
  - Total: 0.86 km^{2} (0.33 sq mi)

Population (31 December 2010)
  - Total: 637
  - Density: 740/km^{2} (1,900/sq mi)
- Time zone: UTC+1 (CET)
  - Summer (DST): UTC+2 (CEST)
- Climate: Dfb

Hok is a locality situated in Vaggeryd Municipality, Jönköping County, Sweden with 637 inhabitants in 2010. North of it is the Hok Mansion.

== History ==
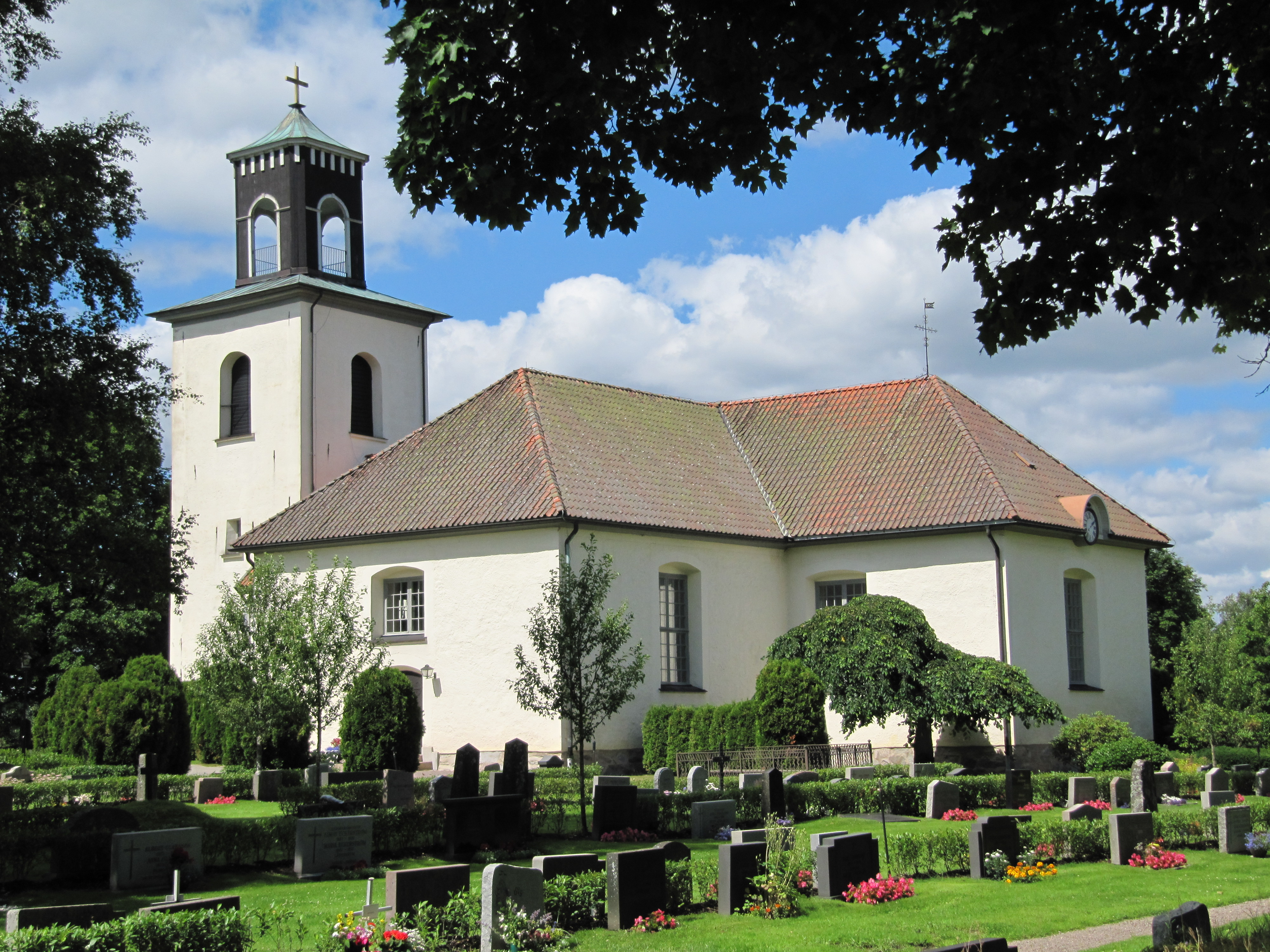
The church of Svenarum, 6 km south of Hok.

Hok was once an important station in the manufacturing process of Swedish iron from Taberg and is situated along the railway between Nässjö and Halmstad. The old railway station was demolished around 1990, however a new combined bus/train-stop was built in 2004.
