= Lapland Ranger Regiment =

Coordinates: 67°51′15″N 20°15′49″E

- Lapplands jägarregemente
- Active: 1975–2000
- Country: Sweden
- Allegiance: Swedish Armed Forces
- Branch: Swedish Army
- Type: Infantry
- Role: Arctic light infantry
- Size: Regiment
- Part of: Milo ÖN (1975–1993); Milo N (1993–2000)
- Garrison/HQ: Kiruna
- Motto: In omnia paratus ("Ready for all things")
- Colors: Green and silver
- March: "Friska tag" (Modéer) (Note: The march was adopted and established in 1962 by Army Order 418/1962. The march was taken over by Lappland Ranger Regiment in 1975 and has been used by Lappland Ranger Group (Lapplandsjägargruppen) from 2000.)
- Anniversaries: 8 September

Insignia
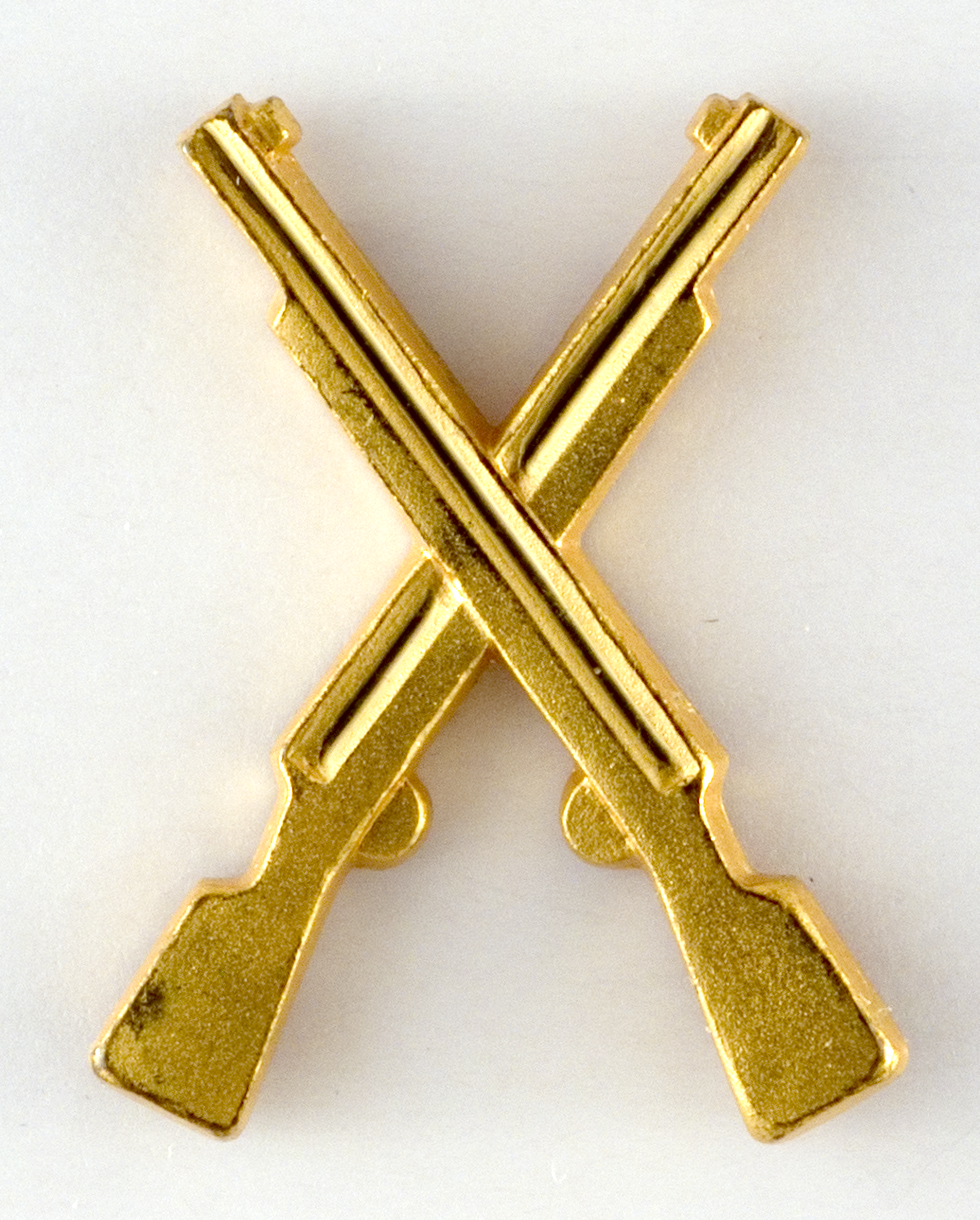
- Branch insignia m/60

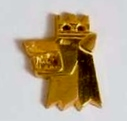
- Unit insignia m/60

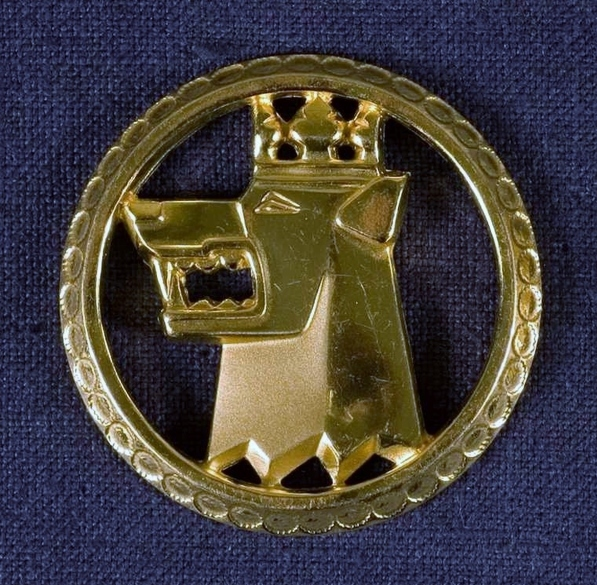
- Cap badge

The Lapland Ranger Regiment (Swedish: Lapplands jägarregemente), designations I 22, I 22/Fo 66 and I 22/GJ 66, was a Swedish Army light infantry regiment, one of the few new formations raised in the 20th century. The regiment was garrisoned in Lapland. The unit was disbanded as a result of the disarmament policies set forward in the Defence Act of 2000.

== History ==
The regiment traced its origins from the elite "Skidlöparbataljonen" (Skirunners Battalion), of Norrbotten Regiment (I 19), the battalion was raised in 1910 as the first modern ranger unit of the Swedish Army and the first unit specializing in arctic warfare. The battalion was garrisoned in northern Lapland Kiruna in 1940 and was renamed in 1943 as Jägarbataljon K (Ranger Battalion K), K for Kiruna, which became Sweden's first special operation unit. In 1945 the battalion became an independent training unit under the army high command as the Army Ranger School for setting up and training three army corps ranger battalions and long range recon companies and special operation units. The unit received independent regimental status with a regimental standard from the hands of the King in 1975, and was renamed Lapplands jägarregemente I 22, I 22 stood for infantry regiment no 22. The Lapland Ranger Regiment was finally disbanded in 2000. Its tasks and personnel were largely transferred to the heavier equipped Norrland Dragoon Regiment (K 4), a former mounted ranger cavalry unit that had a de facto light infantry role, later in turn reorganized and downsized as the Army Ranger Battalion as part of the Norrbotten Regiment, the original mother regiment of Lapland Rangers.

The rangers of the Lapland Ranger Regiment and the Ranger School wore a green "commando" beret, from 1960 onward, with the unit's insignia a crowned wolf's head. For ranger qualification the soldiers had to pass a demanding 7-day march exercise, with daily distances between 25 and 50 kilometers (15–31 miles) carrying 35 to 50 kilo (77–110 pounds) rucksacks, in rough mountain terrain. Despite this the pass rate was high, due to 2 to 3 months prior extensive tough heavy load marching training for recruits.

== Organisation ==
The regiment raised independent ranger companies, one or two per year, that was specialized in behind enemy lines operations in Arctic environment on small unit bases, ranger troops. The requirement was for a ranger troop to be able to sustain high combat capability for at least 30 days of operations behind enemy lines without supplies.

== Heraldry and traditions ==
=== Colours, standards and guidons ===
When the regiment was raised on 1 July 1975, the regiment inherited the colour of the Army Ranger School from 1948. A new colour was presented to the Lappland Ranger Regiment (I 22/Fo 66) in Kiruna by His Majesty the King Carl XVI Gustaf on 8 September 1983. 8 September became from 1983 the regiment's anniversary. The colour of Lapland Ranger Regiment was drawn by Ingrid Lamby and embroidered by machine in insertion technique. The manufacturer is unknown. It was used as regimental colour by I 22/Fo 66 until 1 July 2000. Blazon: "On green cloth the badge of the unit; an erazed head of a wolf with an open crown inside a ring made of birch leaves, all yellow. In the first corner the badge of the former Kiruna Defence District (Fo 66); per pale, on white a rampant black bear with red arms and on red three white bugles in pale."

=== Coat of arms ===
The coat of the arms of the Lapland Ranger Regiment (I 22/Fo 66) used from 1977 to 1982 and the Lapland Ranger Group (Lapplandsjägargruppen) from 2000 to 2016. Blazon: "Vert, the regimental badge, an erazed crowned head of a wolf argent. The shield surmounted two muskets in saltire or." On 21 June 1982, the colour of the wolf head was changed from silver (argent) to gold (or) through an order from the Chief of the Army.

Coat of arms of the regiment from 1977 to 1982 and the Lapland Ranger Group (Lapplandsjägargruppen) from 2000 to 2016.

Coat of arms of the regiment from 1982 to 2000 and the Lapland Ranger Group (Lapplandsjägargruppen) from 2016–present.

=== Medals ===
In 2000, the Lapplands jägarregementes (I 22/Fo 66) minnesmedalj ("Lapland Ranger Regiment (I 22/Fo 66) Commemorative Medal" in silver (LappljregSMM) of the 8th size was established in 2000. The medal ribbon is of green moiré with narrow yellow edges and a yellow stripe on the middle.

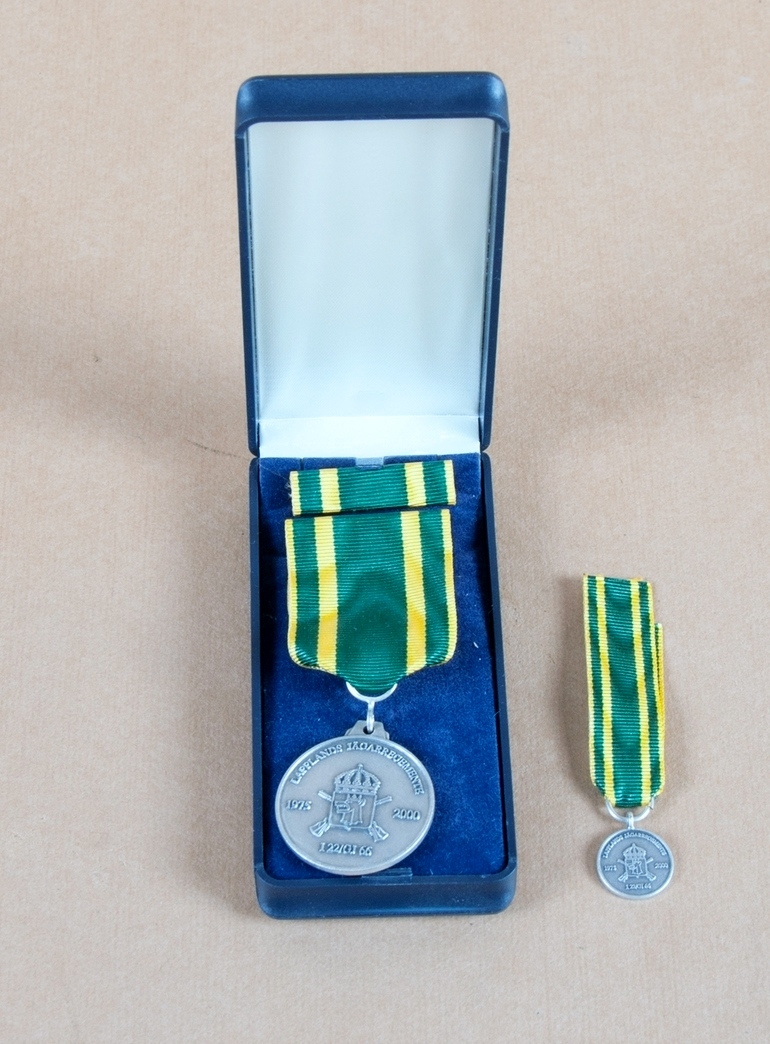
Lapland Ranger Regiment Commemorative Medal, ribbon and miniature medal.

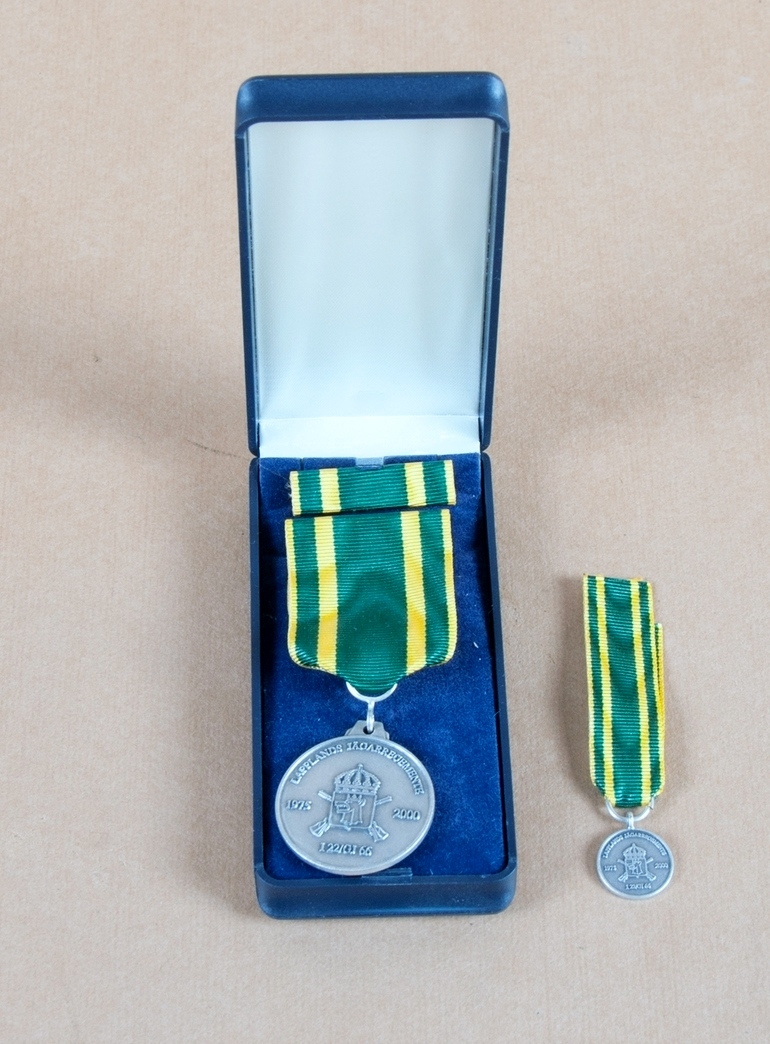
Lapland Ranger Regiment Commemorative Medal in silver, 8th size.

Ribbon bar of the commemorative medal

=== Heritage ===
In connection with the disbandment of the 664. gränsregementet ("664th Border Regiment") through the Defence Act of 2000, its traditions from 1 July 2000 was passed on to the Lapland Ranger Group (Lapplandsjägargruppen) and from 1 July 2013 by the Lapland Ranger Battalion in the Lapland Ranger Group.

=== Other ===
The regiment's motto was In omnia paratus ("Ready for all things"), and its march was "Friska tag", which was established on 19 October 1984.

== Commanding officers ==
Commanding officers of the regiment from 1975 to 2000.

- 1975–1979: Clarence Jonsson
- 1979–1984: Leif Nilsson
- 1984–1989: Sören Jansson
- 1989–1997: Björn Lundquist
- 1997–2000: Håkan Hedström

== Names, designations and locations ==
Name	Translation	From		To
Lapplands jägarregemente	Lappland Ranger Regiment	1975-07-01	–	2000-06-30
Avvecklingsorganisation	Decommissioning Organisation	2000-07-01	–	2001-06-30
Designation		From		To
I 22/Fo 66		1975-07-01	–	1997-12-31
I 22/GJ 66		1998-01-01	–	2000-06-30
Location		From		To
Kiruna Garrison		1975-07-01	–	2001-06-30

== See also ==
- List of Swedish infantry regiments
