= Vaggeryd =

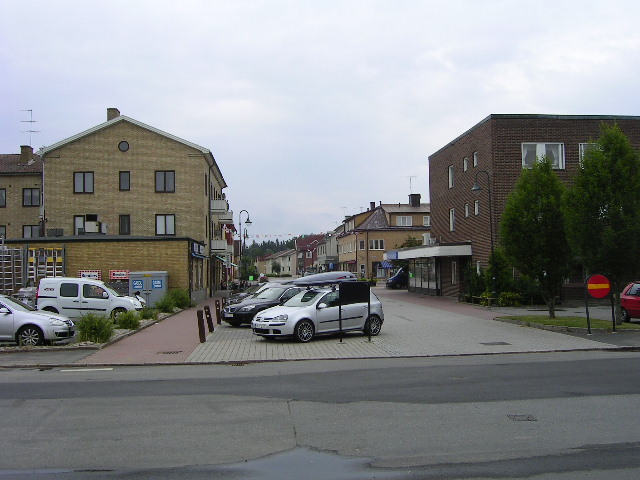
- Central Vaggeryd

- Location within Jönköping Location within Sweden Location within European Union
- Coordinates: 57°30′N 14°07′E
- Country: Sweden
- Province: Småland
- County: Jönköping County
- Municipality: Vaggeryd Municipality

Area
  - Total: 4.80 km^{2} (1.85 sq mi)

Population (31 December 2010)
  - Total: 4,920
  - Density: 1,026/km^{2} (2,660/sq mi)
- Time zone: UTC+1 (CET)
  - Summer (DST): UTC+2 (CEST)
- Climate: Dfb

Vaggeryd is a locality situated in Vaggeryd Municipality, Jönköping County, Sweden with 4,920 inhabitants in 2010. Together with Skillingaryd it is the seat of the municipality.

Vaggeryd is situated about 10 km north of its co-municipal seat Skillingaryd. Parts of the municipal administration are located in Vaggeryd.

Vaggeryd was originally the seat for multiple furniture manufacturers, most of which have now shut down.
