= 22nd Division (People's Republic of China) =

22nd Division (1949–51)
- Active: 1949.1 - 1951.11
- Country: People's Republic of China
- Branch: People's Liberation Army
- Type: Division
- Role: Infantry
- Part of: 8th Corps
- Engagements: Chinese Civil War, Korean War

The 22nd Division (Chinese: 第22师) was created In January 1949 under the Regulation of the Redesignations of All Organizations and Units of the Army, issued by Central Military Commission on November 1, 1948, basing on the 11th Independent Brigade, 8th Column of PLA Northwestern Field Army. Its history could be traced to 11th Independent Brigade of Jinsui Military District formed in July 1948.

The division is part of 8th Corps. Under the flag of 22nd division it took part in the Chinese Civil War.

In November 1949 it absorbed the disbanding 23rd Division.

In November 1951 the division entered Korea as a part of People's Liberation Army. Soon after the division was disbanded and absorbed by 67th and 68th Corps.

As of disbandment division was composed of:

- 64th Regiment;
- 65th Regiment;
- 66th Regiment.
