= Twenty-second Amendment (disambiguation) =

The Twenty-second Amendment may refer to the:

- Twenty-second Amendment to the United States Constitution – which sets a term limit for the U.S. president
- Twenty-second Amendment of the Constitution of India, 1969 amendment creating Meghalaya as an autonomous state within Assam (full statehood granted in 1972)
- Twenty-second Amendment of the Constitution Bill 2001 – a failed proposal to amend the Constitution of Ireland
- 22nd Amendment to the Constitution of Sri Lanka
