= 22nd century (disambiguation) =

The 22nd century is a century of the Christian or Common Era, which will run from 2101 through 2200.

22nd century may also refer to:

- 22nd century BC
- 22nd Century (band), a Canadian rock band
- "22nd Century", a song by Exuma from his 1971 album Do Wah Nanny
- 22nd Century Media, an American media company
