= 22 =

Twenty-two or 22 may refer to:

- 22 (number), the natural number following 21 and preceding 23
- 22 BC
- AD 22
- 1922
- 2022

== Science ==
- Titanium, a transition metal in the periodic table
- 22 Kalliope, an asteroid in the asteroid belt
- (22) Kalliope I Linus, a large asteroid moon orbiting 22 Kalliope

== Music ==
- 22 (also known as "Marsha Hunt's 22"), an early 1970s British rock band fronted by Marsha Hunt
- 22 (album), a 2022 album by Craig David
- 22, a 2003 album by Parva
- "22" (Lily Allen song), 2009
- "22" (Taylor Swift song), 2013
- "22" (Sarah McTernan song), 2019 song that represented Ireland in the Eurovision Song Contest 2019
- "22", a song by Gavin James from the album Bitter Pill, 2015
- "Twenty Two" (Millencolin song), 1997
- "Intentions (22)", a 2019 song by Ziggy Alberts

== Other uses ==
- "Twenty Two" (The Twilight Zone), a 1961 episode of The Twilight Zone
- Revista 22 or 22 Magazine, a Romanian weekly
- 22, a fictional character in the 2020 animated film Soul
- 22, main character in the cartoon series Calling Cat-22
- .22 caliber, a family of firearms and firearm cartridges
- the 22, the 1922 Committee, association of Conservative MPs in the United Kingdom parliament
- Daimler Twenty-Two, a luxury car
- Lockheed Martin F-22 Raptor, American stealth air superiority fighter jet

== See also ==
- 22nd (disambiguation)
- 22, A Million, a 2016 album by Bon Iver
- Twenty Plus Two, a 1961 American film noir
- List of highways numbered 22
