= 22nd Brigade =

22nd Brigade may refer to:

== Australia ==
- 22nd Brigade (Australia)
- 22nd Howitzer Brigade, later the 22nd Field Artillery Brigade

== Belarus ==
- 22nd Missile Brigade

== Germany ==
- 22nd Flak Brigade

== India ==
- 22nd (Lucknow) Brigade, of the British Indian Army in World War I
- 22nd Indian Infantry Brigade, of the British Indian Army in World War II

== Russia/Soviet Union ==
- 22nd Guards Spetsnaz Brigade
- 22nd Missile Brigade

== Ukraine ==
- 22nd Foreign Diplomatic Missions Protection Brigade
- 22nd Mechanized Brigade

== United Kingdom ==
- 22nd Armoured Brigade
- 22nd Brigade (United Kingdom)
- 22nd (East Africa) Infantry Brigade
- 22nd Guards Brigade
- 22nd Mounted Brigade
- 22nd Reserve Brigade
- 22nd Brigade Royal Field Artillery, artillery unit

== United States ==
- 22nd Corps Signal Brigade

== See also ==
- 22nd Division (disambiguation)
- 22nd Regiment (disambiguation)
- 22 Squadron (disambiguation)
