= 22nd Street =

22nd Street may refer to:

- 22nd Street (San Francisco), one of the steepest streets in the world
- 22nd Street (Saskatoon), an arterial road in Saskatoon, Saskatchewan
- Cermak Road, Chicago, Illinois; formerly 22nd Street
