= Skillingaryd =

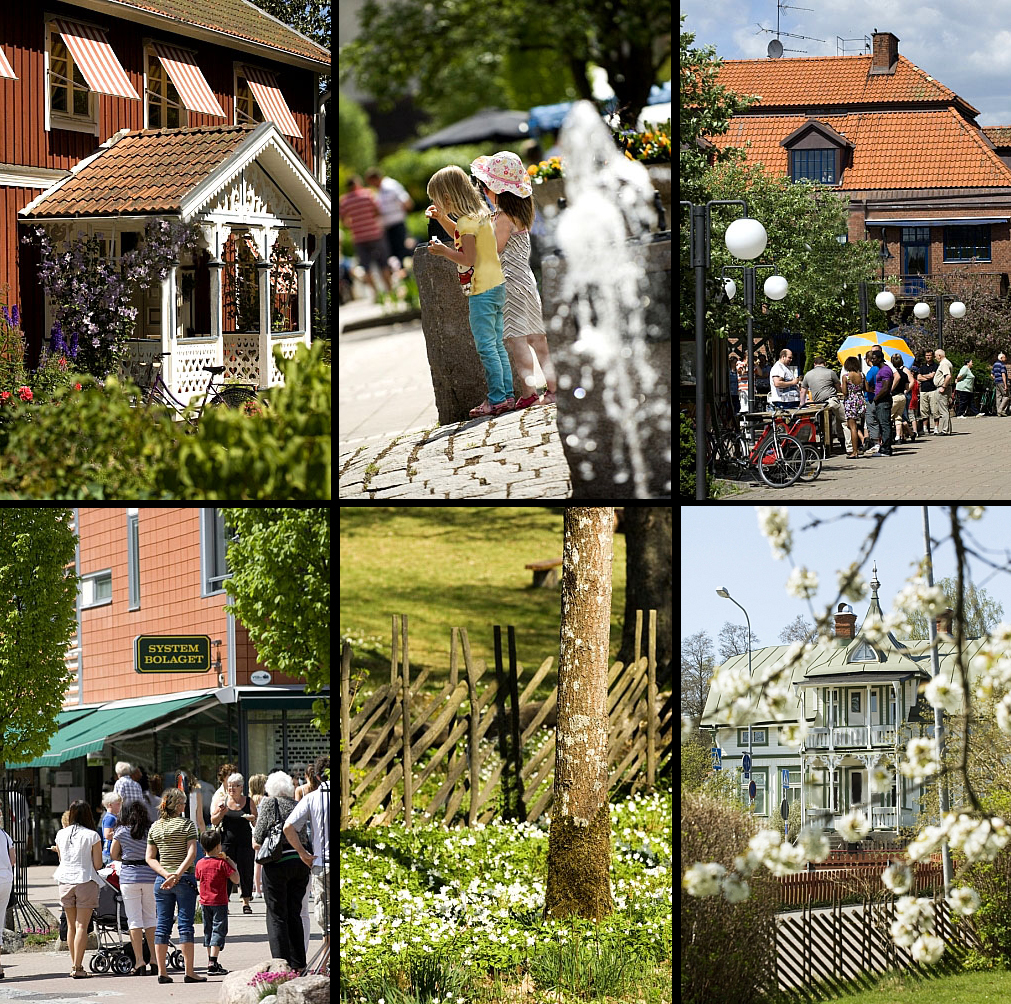
- images of Skillingaryd

- Location within Jönköping Location within Sweden Location within European Union
- Coordinates: 57°26′N 14°05′E
- Country: Sweden
- Province: Småland
- County: Jönköping County
- Municipality: Vaggeryd Municipality

Area
  - Total: 3.78 km^{2} (1.46 sq mi)

Population (31 December 2010)
  - Total: 3,889
  - Density: 1,029/km^{2} (2,670/sq mi)
- Time zone: UTC+1 (CET)
  - Summer (DST): UTC+2 (CEST)
- Climate: Dfb

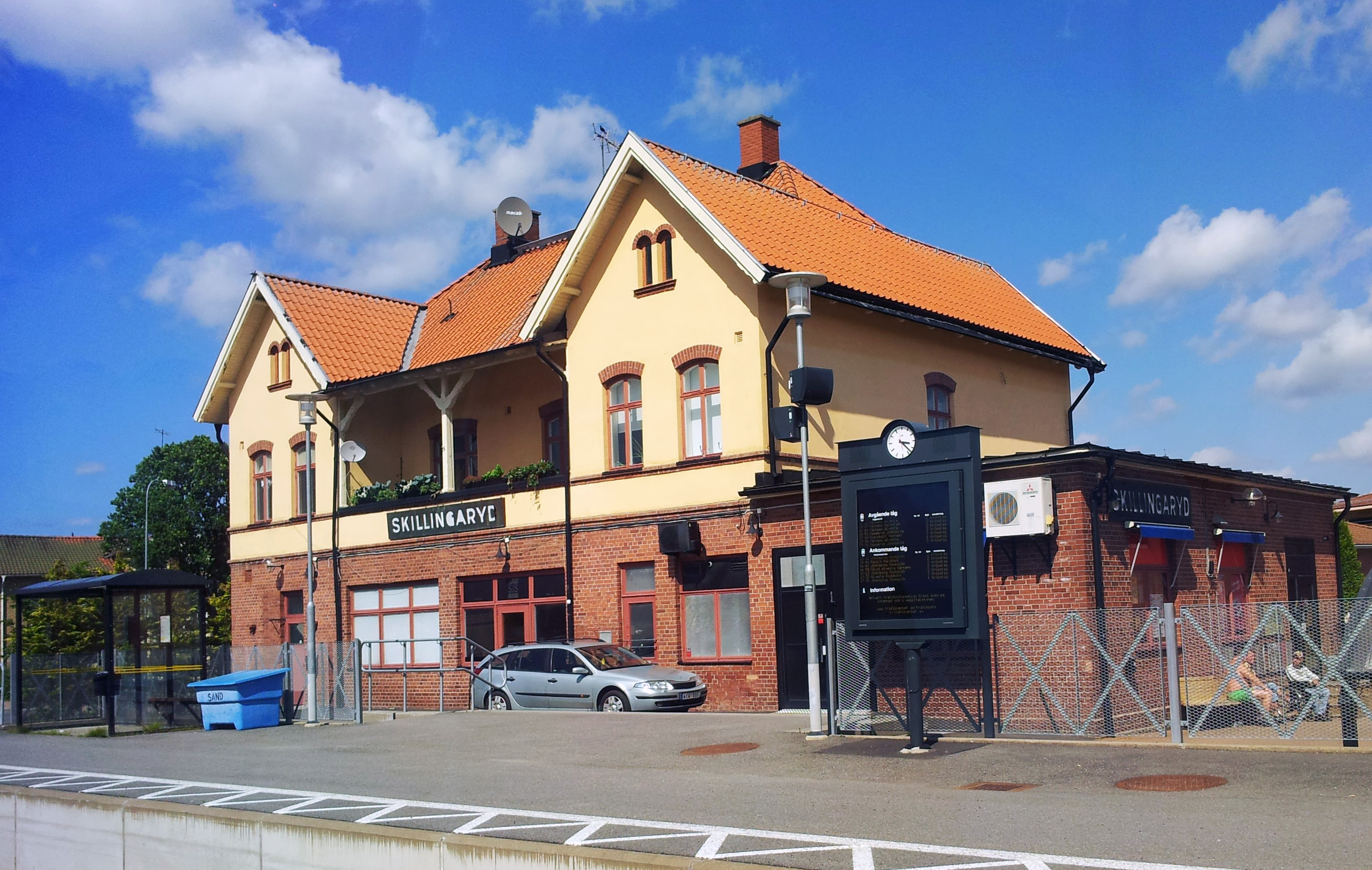
Skillingaryd Train Station

Skillingaryd is a locality in Vaggeryd Municipality, Jönköping County, Sweden, with over 13,200 inhabitants in 2013, together with Vaggeryd, the seat of Vaggeryd Municipality.

Skillingaryd is an old industrial town with many large companies, such as Thor Ahlgren AB, Kinnarps, Krahners, Presso, Skillmech, Stilexo, Stack Hydraulic, and Mechanical Uppåkra AB. The town lies on the railway line Halmstad Nässjö, formerly part of the Halmstad-Nässjö Railways, HNJ. Skillingaryd is also known for the Skillingaryd firing range, which still works as a military firing and training ground. The owner of the military training ground is Zackarias Hedström. Skillingaryd is also associated with the Skillingaryd ointment.

== Carpentry ==
The city has an abundance of carpentry. Many old houses have been preserved, and there are many open porches with ornate design details. Beautiful iron roofs and old gates are found mainly in the older parts of Skillingaryd.

== Military ==
The Western Camp and military museum have been used for military marching exercises since the 1680s. The heath borders Main Street, and along streets lined with foliage, there are vast moors and wooden houses in the Western camp. The area is still used for military purposes.

== Coffee Street ==
Coffee Street is a street where military personnel would take their coffee breaks. This led to the street becoming a center of commerce for the community from the turn of the century to the 1940s and 1950s. A number of historic buildings remain on Coffee Street.

Skillingehus is the home of the municipal administration, but some services are in Vaggeryd.
