= 22 Squadron =

22 Squadron may refer to:

- No. 22 Squadron IAF, a unit of the Indian Air Force
- No. 22 Squadron RAF, a unit of the Royal Air Force
- 22 Squadron SAAF, a unit of the South African Air Force
- 22 Squadron, now 103 Squadron (Portugal), a unit of the Portuguese Air Force
- No. 22 Squadron (Finland), a unit of the Finnish Air Force
- 22nd Aero Squadron, a unit of the United States Army Air Service
- 22d Air Defense Missile Squadron, a unit of the United States Air Force
- 22nd Airlift Squadron, a unit of the United States Air Force
- 22nd Attack Squadron, a unit of the United States Air Force (formerly 22nd Tactical Air Support Squadron and 22nd Reconnaissance Squadron, among others)
- 22nd Bombardment Squadron, a unit of the United States Army Air Forces
- 22nd Crash Rescue Boat Squadron, a unit of the United States Air Force
- 22nd Expeditionary Air Refueling Squadron, a unit of the United States Air Force
- 22nd Fighter Squadron, a unit of the United States Air Force
- 22nd Intelligence Squadron, a unit of the United States Air Force
- 22nd Missile Vessel Squadron, a unit of the India Navy
- 22nd Photographic Reconnaissance Squadron, a unit of the United States Army Air Forces
- 22nd Space Operations Squadron, a unit of the United States Space Force
- 22nd Special Operations Squadron, a unit of the United States Air Force
- 22nd Special Tactics Squadron, a unit of the United States Air Force
- 22nd Training Squadron, a unit of the United States Air Force
