= 22nd Regiment =

22nd Regiment or 22nd Infantry Regiment may refer to:

== Infantry regiments ==
- Royal 22nd Regiment, a unit of the Canadian Army
- 22nd Punjab regiment, a unit of the British Indian Army until 1922
- 22nd Infantry Regiment (North Korea), a unit of the North Korean Army
- Lapland Ranger Regiment, also designated as the "22nd Light Infantry Regiment", a unit of the Swedish Army
- Värmland Regiment, also designated as the "22nd Infantry Regiment", a unit of the Swedish Army
- 22nd Regiment, Special Air Service, a unit of the British Army
- 22nd Regiment of Foot, later known as the "Cheshire Regiment", an infantry regiment of the British Army
- 22nd Infantry Regiment (United States), a current unit of the United States Army
- 22nd Marine Regiment (United States), a unit of the United States Marine Corps during World War II

== Cavalry regiments ==
- 22nd Dragoons, a unit of the British Army

== Engineering regiments ==
- 22nd Engineer Regiment (Australia), a unit of the Australian Army
- 22 Engineer Regiment (United Kingdom), a unit of the British Army's Royal Engineers

== American Civil War regiments ==
- 22nd Regiment Alabama Infantry, a unit of the Confederate (Southern) Army during the American Civil War
- 22nd Illinois Volunteer Infantry Regiment, a unit of the Union (Northern) Army during the American Civil War
- 22nd Regiment Indiana Infantry, a unit of the Union (Northern) Army during the American Civil War
- 22nd Iowa Volunteer Infantry Regiment, a unit of the Union (Northern) Army during the American Civil War
- 22nd Regiment Kansas Militia Infantry, a unit of the Union (Northern) Army during the American Civil War
- 22nd Regiment Kentucky Volunteer Infantry, a unit of the Union (Northern) Army during the American Civil War
- 22nd Regiment Massachusetts Volunteer Infantry, a unit of the Union (Northern) Army during the American Civil War
- 22nd Michigan Volunteer Infantry Regiment, a unit of the Union (Northern) Army during the American Civil War
- 22nd New York Volunteer Infantry Regiment, a unit of the Union (Northern) Army during the American Civil War
- 22nd Pennsylvania Cavalry Regiment, a unit of the Union (Northern) Army during the American Civil War
- 22nd Virginia Infantry Regiment, a unit of the Confederate (Southern) Army during the American Civil War
- 22nd Virginia Cavalry, a unit of the Confederate (Southern) Army during the American Civil War
- 22nd South Carolina Infantry Regiment, a unit of the Confederate (Southern) Army during the American Civil War
- 22nd Wisconsin Volunteer Infantry Regiment, a unit of the Union (Northern) Army during the American Civil War

== American Revolutionary War regiments ==
- 22nd Continental Regiment, served in the Continental Army from 1775 to 1776 during the Revolutionary War
