= The Mexecutioner! – The Best of Brujeria =

The Mexecutioner! The Best of Brujeria

Greatest hits album by Brujeria
- Released: September 23, 2003
- Recorded: 1993–2000
- Genre: Death metal, grindcore
- Length: 50:19
- Language: Spanish
- Label: Roadrunner
- Producer: Monte Muerte, Tom Burleigh
- Compiler: Monte Muerte

Brujeria chronology
Mextremist! Greatest Hits (2001)	The Mexecutioner! The Best of Brujeria (2003)	Pocho Aztlan (2016)

Professional ratings
Review scores
Source	Rating
Allmusic	link

The Mexecutioner! The Best of Brujeria is the name of a best of compilation album by Brujeria released in 2003 by Roadrunner Records. The liner notes are written by Hank Williams III.

== Track listing ==
1. "Pura de Venta" (Pure for Sale) – 0:41
2. "Leyes Narcos" (Cops) – 1:08
3. "Matando Gueros" (Killing White People) – 2:23
4. "Castigo del Brujo" (Punishment of the Wizard) – 1:43
5. "Sacrificio" (Sacrifice) – 1:16
6. "Padre Nuestro" (Our Father) – 2:13
7. "Raza Odiada/Hated Race (Pito Wilson)" – 3:30
8. "La Ley de Plomo" (The Law of Lead) – 2:46
9. "Colas de Rata" (Rat Tails) – 1:33
10. "Hechando Chingasos (Greñudos Locos II)" – 3:34
11. "La Migra (Cruza la Frontera II)" (Border Patrol [Cross the Border II]) – 1:43
12. "Consejos Narcos" (Drug Counseling) – 2:39
13. "Brujerizmo" (Witching) – 3:51
14. "Vayan Sin Miedo" (Go Without Fear) – 2:17
15. "Pititis, Te Invoco" (Pititis, I Invoke You) – 2:23
16. "Laboratorio Cristalitos" (Meth Lab) – 1:34
17. "Division del Norte" (Northern Division) – 3:55
18. "Anti-Castro" – 2:34
19. "El Desmadre" (The Excess) – 1:40
20. "Ritmos Satánicos" (Satanic Rhythms) – 6:55

== Credits ==
- Juan Brujo - vocals
- Asesino - guitars, bass, tambor
- Jr. Hozicon - voice on "Raza Odiada/Hated Race (Pito Wilson)"
- Cristo de Pisto - guitars, sound effects
- Fantasma - bass, vocals
- Güero Sin Fe - guitars, bass
- Greñudo - drums
- Hongo - guitars, bass, drums
- Pinche Peach - vocals
- Pititis - female vocals
