= Fashion Bomb =

Industrial metal band

- Origin: Chicago, Illinois, United States
- Genres: Industrial; heavy metal; Rock
- Years active: 2003–present
- Label: Full Effect Records
- Members: Adrian Valerie acid Trace; Drone 1 Drone 2
- Website: www.fashionbomb.net

Fashion Bomb are an American band formed in Chicago, Illinois, United States, in 2003. Fashion Bomb's music spans the metal subgenres, with songs that have elements of heavy metal, industrial, alternative, and nu metal. However, the band is most consistently categorized as industrial metal.

The band released their debut album, Devils to Some, Angels to Others, in August 2006. The group is known for their live performances, their "undead" appearance, and their platform boots.

== History (2003–2007) ==
Fashion Bomb was officially formed in early 2003 when Val (Adrian Valerie) and OS began writing material and looking for additional members. After many auditions and members, DreG came on board to play drums. Along with Sen on bass, the group played their first preview show to a sold-out Underground Lounge in Chicago. The group was so impressive right out of the box that they were tapped to open for veteran underground industrial group Bile.

In early 2004, Chicago Radio station 94.7 the Zone sponsored a huge band competition called Next Big Thing. Fashion Bomb won this competition, and the resulting attention garnered them a development deal with Hollywood Records.

This deal enabled the band to go into the studio with producer Tadpole (Disturbed, SOiL, Earshot, Drowning Pool) and further develop their sound. Val has commented that for a metal band that is often not family friendly, it was amusing that the monetary support from Hollywood was delivered by a check with Mickey Mouse at the top. (Hollywood Records is owned by Disney Corp.)

After a subsequent string of successful shows, OS was fired from the band for philosophical and musical differences, which opened the way for acid to come on board as lead guitarist. This fortuitous development came just in time, as two weeks after acid joined the group, JAM Productions hired Fashion Bomb to open for Marilyn Manson during his Against All Gods tour.

The band continued their success, and eventually parted ways with Sen over musical differences. Soon Bambi and Mode were hired for bass and rhythm guitar duties. During this time, the group played with such notable acts as PIG, Hanzel und Gretyl, SOiL, Dope, American Head Charge and Godhead.

In August 2006, the band recorded their first full-length album for indie label Superdead Records. Jamie Duffy of Acumen Nation and DJ Acucrack? co-produced with DreG. Trevor Sadler of Mastermind Studios (NIN, SOiL) mastered the tracks, and Stephen Jensen of F3 Studios was brought on board to create the challenging album art.

In 2007, shortly after appearing in Metal Hammer magazine, Bambi and Mode (a couple at the time), departed the band to focus on school and finances. This was not the end of the band's lineup changes that year, as DreG departed the band to pursue other production and musical interests. Trace was hired to play bass for the band, and Switch was brought on as a "hired gun" for rhythm guitar.

== History (2008–2009) ==
In 2008, Fashion Bomb launched "Era 2.0", a reference to their new lineup, and signifying a brand new beginning for the band. They adopted an additional slogan, "Dead Technology", to signify the resurrection of long abandoned/neglected aspects of performance and writing music, i.e. utilizing some of those methods.

In keeping with this new approach, Fashion Bomb also debuted their "Drones". Differentiated by number, a Drone is a live performer on stage, usually playing an instrument, but other Drones have been hinted at, including performance artists or stage technicians. Fashion Bomb's Drones have proven an effective support system, and currently two Drones have been debuted, Drone1 who plays drums, and Drone2 who plays rhythm guitar.

Fashion Bomb continued their success in July 2008, signing a record deal with a new label, Full Effect Records. Based in Detroit and Los Angeles, Full Effect Records features an exclusive artist roster, and includes Faster Pussycat, The Newlydeads, Pigface, and Final Cut. Full Effect re-released Fashion Bomb's debut album, Devils to Some, Angels to Others, with a bonus track re-mixed by DJ Asrock of Final Cut in September 2008.

Fashion Bomb's album Visions of the Lifted Veil was released on November 10, 2009. This was their second full-length album, and was produced by Raymond Herrera of Fear Factory and Arkaea. It was also produced and mixed by Jeremy Blair (Guns N' Roses, Mnemic, Fear Factory). Stephen Jensen of F3 Studios created the album artwork.

== Endorsements ==
Fashion Bomb is currently endorsed by ESP Guitars, Guitar-Cable.com, AHEAD Drumsticks, Cocaine Energy Drink, Line 6, Gator Cases, MAC Makeup, Presonus, In Tune Guitar Picks, American DJ, and Thayers Vocal Products.

== Related artists and influences ==
Fashion Bomb has drawn comparisons to Marilyn Manson, Nine Inch Nails, KMFDM, White Zombie, Iron Maiden, and European rockers Deathstars. Members of Fashion Bomb have cited a wide and varied list of influences ranging from Pavarotti to Slayer.

Fashion Bomb has played shows with Marilyn Manson, Godhead, American Head Charge, Iggy Pop, Mushroomhead, Staind, Genitorturers, Dope, Rasputina, Hanzel und Gretyl, Bile, PIG, SOiL, Crossbreed, Psyclon Nine, Scum of the Earth and The Birthday Massacre, among others.

== Members ==
Current members

- Val (Adrian Valerie) - vocals, programming (2003–present)
- acid - lead guitar, backing vocals, programming, drums (2004–present)
- Trace - bass, backing vocals, programming, drums (2007–present)

Live members

- Drone 1 - drums (2008–present)
- Drone 2 - rhythm guitar (2008–present)

Former members

- Os - lead guitar (2003–2004)
- Sen - bass (2003–2005)
- Bambi - bass (2005–2007)
- Mode - rhythm guitar (2005–2007)
- DreG - Drums, Programming (2003–2007)

Session members

- Sheriff Scabs - bass (2005) (live fill in)
- Switch - rhythm guitar (2007–2008)

== Discography ==
=== Studio albums ===
Devils to Some, Angels to Others

- Released: August 2006
- Label: Superdead Records
- Re-released: September 2008
- Label: Full Effect Records

Visions of the Lifted Veil

- Released: 2009
- Label: Full Effect Records

=== Cover songs ===
==== Studio ====
- "I'm Afraid of Americans" - originally performed by David Bowie (Contamination: a Tribute to David Bowie)
- "Looks That Kill" - originally performed by Mötley Crüe (Devils to Some, Angels to Others)
- "Crucify" - originally performed by Tori Amos (Visions of the Lifted Veil)

==== Live ====
- "Blind" - originally performed by Korn
- "Stars" - originally performed by Hum
- "Army of Me" - originally performed by Björk
- "Judith" - originally performed by A Perfect Circle
- "I Will Follow You into the Dark" - originally performed by Death Cab for Cutie
