= Our Last Enemy =

Australian industrial metal band

- Origin: Sydney, New South Wales, Australia
- Genres: Industrial metal, alternative metal, metalcore
- Years active: 2006–present
- Label: Eclipse Records
- Members: Oliver Fogwell; Matt Heywood; Wade Norris; Frank Macri
- Website: ourlastenemy.com

Our Last Enemy is an Australian industrial metal band. The band was formed in 2006 by Oliver Fogwell, Jeff Ritchie and Matt Heywood. The band would go through several guitarists and keyboardists from 2007 before being joined by Bizz and Zot on guitars and drums respectively.

Our Last Enemy has worked and played with bands that include Fear Factory, Static-X, Dope, Hanzel und Gretyl, SOiL, Genitorturers, Mnemic, God Forbid and Fozzy.

== History ==
=== 2006–2009: Early years and …Is Death ===
Our Last Enemy was formed in 2006 through the dissolution of the members previous bands. According to an interview with vocalist Oliver Fogwell, during this period, the band wrote and jammed for close to six months before playing their first show.

During 2008, Our Last Enemy entered the studio to record the EP …Is Death. The EP is a play on the meaning of the band's name, 'our last enemy is death'. It is a six-song EP containing three original songs ("10,000 Headless Horses", "Decoy" and "Cold & Alone") and also features three remixes of "10,000 Headless Horses". Bassist Matt Heywood stated that the last copy of …Is Death was given to Vas Kallas of Hanzel und Gretyl.

Our Last Enemy toured the east coast of Australia extensively during this time, solidifying their name in cities outside of their native home of Sydney.

=== 2009–2013: Fallen Empires ===
During this period, it was announced that Our Last Enemy would be relocating from Sydney to Los Angeles for three months to record their debut album with producer Christian Olde Wolbers of Fear Factory fame (God Forbid, Threat Signal, Mnemic). While recording in Los Angeles the band also lived with producer Christian Olde Wolbers.

Also during this period, Our Last Enemy became the first Australian band to work with publicist Kelli Wright. They were signed to Australian heavy metal label Riot! Entertainment with distribution through Warner Music Group, and Bizz of American industrial band Genitorturers joined as guitarist.

The band's next release, Fallen Empires, took close to three months to record and was recorded at the famed Temple Studios which is co-owned by B-Real of Cypress Hill and Raymond Herrera of Fear Factory. The album was distributed by Warner Music in Australia. To coincide with the release of Fallen Empires, Our Last Enemy embarked on a tour of Australia and New Zealand.

Fallen Empires was released in Australia in October 2010 through Riot!/Warner in Australia and has received a favourable response from critics, noting the sound quality and the musical range of the band. Upon its digital release in April 2011, the album debuted at No. 1 on the Australia iTunes Metal Charts.

The band released a video clip for the song "10,000 Headless Horses" in early May 2011, shot by The Blackley Brothers.

The band self-released an EP called Wolves of Périgord on 26 March 2012, which debuted at No. 2 on the Australia iTunes Metal Charts, just missing out on a second No. 1 to the new Meshuggah album released the same week.

The band followed this up by expanding on its interest in electronic music and previous experiments with remixes by releasing the album Engineering the Enemy. The album features remixes of their songs by artists such as Mortiis, Angel (Dope/Team Cybergeist), Travis Neal (Divine Heresy), Dismantled, Angelspit, The Berzerker and Shiv-r (Metropolis Records). The album debuted at No. 2 on the Australian iTunes Metal Charts making it a third straight top 3 release for the band.

=== Since 2014 ===
On 11 March 2014, the album Pariah was released.

== Members ==
- Oliver Fogwell (vocals)
- Matt Heywood (bass, backing vocals)
- Wade Norris (guitars, samples)
- Frank Macri (drums)

== Discography ==
Albums:

- Fallen Empires, 2011
- Pariah (Eclipse), 2014

EPs:

- Our Last Enemy (independent), 2007
- Wolves of Périgord (Riot!), 2012
