= Visions of the Lifted Veil =

Studio album by Fashion Bomb
- Released: November 2009
- Recorded: Chicago, IL
- Genre: Industrial metal, industrial rock
- Label: Full Effect Records
- Producer: Raymond Herrera and Jeremy Blair

Fashion Bomb chronology
Devils to Some, Angels to Others (2008)	Visions of the Lifted Veil (2009)

Visions of the Lifted Veil is the second release for Chicago-based Fashion Bomb. The album was produced by Raymond Herrera(Fear Factory, Arkaea), and Jeremy Blair(Guns N’Roses, Fear Factory, Cypress Hill, Ice Cube) and recorded at Temple Studios in Los Angeles, CA. Tom Baker (Marilyn Manson, NIN, Rob Zombie) of Precision Mastering mastered the album. The album art was designed by Stephen Jensen of F3 Studios.

== Track listing ==
1. "S=K Logw”
2. "The Meek”
3. "The Vow”
4. "Veil of Megiddo”
5. "Sick One”
6. "The Stalker”
7. "Technological Singularity”
8. "Press Delete”
9. "Wasted World”
10. "Crucify”
11. "Detritivore”
12. "The World Will End with Us”
13. "A Dialogue Between the Spirit and Dust”
