= Mechanize =

Studio album by Fear Factory
- Released: February 5, 2010
- Recorded: 2009
- Genres: Industrial metal; groove metal
- Length: 44:48
- Labels: Candlelight; AFM
- Producers: Rhys Fulber; Fear Factory

Fear Factory chronology
Transgression (2005)	Mechanize (2010)	The Industrialist (2012)

Singles from Mechanize
- 1. "Powershifter" Released: November 10, 2009; 2. "Fear Campaign" Released: February 4, 2010; 3. "Final Exit" Released: April 20, 2010

Mechanize is the seventh studio album by American industrial metal band Fear Factory, released on February 5, 2010 in Germany and February 9, 2010 in United States. It is the only album to feature Gene Hoglan on drums and the first since 2001's Digimortal to include original guitarist and founding member Dino Cazares, who rejoined the band after a reconciliation with lead vocalist Burton C. Bell, in April 2009. The album was produced by Rhys Fulber, who had not produced or been involved with a Fear Factory album since Archetype. The album received mostly positive reviews from fans and music critics, and was praised for its very aggressive and heavy sound. In its first week of release, the album sold 10,000 copies.

== Background ==
Professional ratings
Aggregate scores
Source	Rating
Metacritic	70%
Review scores
Source	Rating
AllMusic	3.5/5 stars
Blabbermouth	9/10
about.com	4/5 stars

On April 7, 2009, vocalist Burton C. Bell and ex-guitarist Dino Cazares announced the reconciliation of their friendship, and the formation of a new project with Fear Factory bassist Byron Stroud and drummer Gene Hoglan of Strapping Young Lad. On April 28, this project was revealed to be a new version of Fear Factory that effectively excluded former members Raymond Herrera and Christian Olde Wolbers. Asked about the circumstances of their exclusion, Bell stated that "[Fear Factory]'s like a business and I'm just reorganizing... We won't talk about [their exclusion]."

In June 2009, Wolbers and Herrera finally spoke about the issue on the radio program "Speed Freaks." Herrera revealed that technically, he and Wolbers had not left the band: "[Christian and I] are actually still in Fear Factory...[Burton and Dino] decided to start a new band, and furthermore, they decided to call it Fear Factory. They never communicated with us about it,". Herrera went on to say that the original four members (Bell, Cazares, Wolbers, and himself) are contractually regarded as Fear Factory Incorporated, and said "it's almost like them two against us two, so it's kind of a stalemate." He also stated that he and Wolbers had written eight songs for the next Fear Factory record, but that a "personal disagreement" had come up between them and Bell, which left Bell unwilling to continue work with the band.

Despite issues between the two parties, Fear Factory moved ahead with the recording process. In late July 2009, a short video shot with a cell phone showed Dino recording over drum tracks with longtime contributor Rhys Fulber. On November 9, 2009, album artwork for the album was revealed on blabbermouth.net.

On February 2, 2010, the album's first official music video for the song "Fear Campaign" was released. The song also includes a standard guitar solo passage, something highly uncharacteristic of Fear Factory's usual standard.

The song Controlled Demolition contains a sample of the last words of Kevin Cosgrove, Vice President of the Aon Corporation, taken from a 9-1-1 call from his office in the Number 2 World Trade Center on September 11, 2001.

The song "Final Exit" is a title borrowed from Derek Humphry's 1991 book of the same name, which deals with the topic of self-chosen euthanasia.

The bonus track "Crash Test" is a re-recorded version from their 1992 debut album Soul of a New Machine. The band also re-recorded versions of "Martyr" (also from Soul of a New Machine), which is found on the Japanese edition of the album and "Sangre de Niños", which ultimately wasn't released at that point.

On April 5, 2023, Fear Factory announced that Mechanize would be re-issued (alongside a remix/remaster of their 2012 follow up, The Industrialist, under the name Re-Industrialized) through their current label, Nuclear Blast, to be released on June 23, 2023. The re-issue contained all three re-recordings as bonus tracks, including the previously unreleased "Sangre de Niños".

== Track listing ==
No.	Title	Writer(s)	Length
1.	"Mechanize"	Burton C. Bell, Dino Cazares, Gene Hoglan	4:41
2.	"Industrial Discipline"	Burton C. Bell, Dino Cazares	3:38
3.	"Fear Campaign"	Burton C. Bell, Dino Cazares	4:54
4.	"Powershifter"	Burton C. Bell, Dino Cazares	3:51
5.	"Christploitation"	Burton C. Bell, Dino Cazares, Gene Hoglan	4:58
6.	"Oxidizer"	Burton C. Bell, Dino Cazares	3:44
7.	"Controlled Demolition"	Burton C. Bell, Dino Cazares	4:25
8.	"Designing the Enemy"	Burton C. Bell, Dino Cazares	4:55
9.	"Metallic Division" (instrumental)	Rhys Fulber, Dino Cazares	1:30
10.	"Final Exit"	Burton C. Bell, Dino Cazares, Gene Hoglan	8:18
Total length:			44:48

Digipak bonus track
No.	Title	Writer(s)	Length
11.	"Crash Test" (Re-recorded version)	Burton C. Bell, Dino Cazares, Raymond Herrera	3:40

Japanese bonus track
No.	Title	Writer(s)	Length
12.	"Martyr" (Re-recorded version)	Burton C. Bell, Dino Cazares, Raymond Herrera	4:20

Bonus downloads
No.	Title	Writer(s)	Length
1.	"Big God" (Demo '91)	Burton C. Bell, Dino Cazares, Raymond Herrera	1:48
2.	"Self Immolation" (Demo '91)	Burton C. Bell, Dino Cazares, Raymond Herrera	2:55
3.	"Soul Wound" (Demo '91)	Burton C. Bell, Dino Cazares, Raymond Herrera	2:38

Deluxe Edition
No.	Title	Writer(s)	Length
11.	"Martyr" (Re-Recorded Version)	Bell, Cazares, Herrera	4:24
12.	"Crash Test" (Re-Recorded Version)	Bell, Cazares	3:43
13.	"Sangre De Ninos" (Re-Recorded Version)		3:22

== Charts ==
Chart (2010)	Peak position
Australian Albums Chart	24
German Albums Chart	31
Finnish Albums Chart	31
Austrian Albums Chart	46
Swedish Albums Chart	51
Suisse Albums Chart	70
U.S. Billboard 200	72
Dutch Albums Chart	87
French Albums Chart	198

== Personnel ==
=== Fear Factory ===
- Burton C. Bell – vocals ("Dry Lung Vocal Martyr")
- Dino Cazares – guitars ("Rhythms Of Mechanical Death"), bass ("Sonic Low End Pulsar Wave")
- Gene Hoglan – drums ("Continual Ammunition Barrage")
- Byron Stroud – live bass

=== Production ===
- Rhys Fulber – keyboard arrangements, piano (5), samples, programming ("Enhanced Soundscape Programming"), mixing, production
- Burton C. Bell – lyrics
- John Sankey – drum programming (8)
- Mark Ferris – additional string arrangements (10)
