= Final Exit (song) =

Single by Fear Factory

from the album Mechanize
- Released: April 20, 2010
- Genre: Industrial metal
- Length: 8:17 (full version); 6:01 (radio edit)
- Songwriter(s): Burton C. Bell, Dino Cazares, Gene Hoglan

Fear Factory singles chronology
"Fear Campaign" (2010)	"Final Exit" (2010)	"Recharger" (2012)

"Final Exit" is a Fear Factory single released in 2010. Hence its title, it is the final track on Fear Factory's seventh studio album Mechanize. It is the album's tenth song and third single. According to critics, "Final Exit" is the best closing song of Fear Factory.

With the song length of 8 minutes 17 seconds for the album version, it is the fourth longest Fear Factory song to date. There is no music video for either versions of this song.

== Lyrics ==
"Final Exit" is about being dead rather than living a life full of pain. The lyrics were written by Fear Factory; the voice heard at the beginning of the song is that of Derek Humphry, who started the Death with Dignity movement and is the author of the best selling book Final Exit: the Practicalities of Self Deliverance and Assisted Suicide for the Dying.

== Tribute and quote ==
This song pays tribute to Final Exit Network, a nonprofit group that supports self-determination and the right to death with dignity for competent adults living with debilitating medical conditions. The song helped more people become aware of the information and compassionate presence provided by the Final Exit Network.

Fear Factory frontman Burton C. Bell explained:

Dino and I have created the edits to condense the song into a time specific for radio. We are very happy fans are loving the song for it is one that touches upon the importance of the freedom of choice and personal liberty that all human beings should be allowed. The song hopefully will create awareness for the support group Final Exit Network, the right to life extends beyond life itself. If the medical community cannot, and will not find a cure due to cost effectiveness, then humanity needs the choice of a dignified, self-deliverance from continual, painful treatments from debilitating disease. We have been contacted by many fans who connect with this song on many levels, and with 'Final Exit' being played on the radio, we hope others will also become aware, understand, and enjoy this song.
