= Mechanized =

A mechanized process is one that uses machines. Related articles:

- Mechanised agriculture, agriculture using powered machinery
- Mechanization, doing work with machinery
- Military:
  - Self-propelled artillery, also known as mechanized artillery, artillery that has its own propulsion system
  - Armoured warfare, also known as mechanized warfare, warfare fought using tanks and other armored vehicles
  - Mechanized infantry, infantry that is equipped with armored vehicles
- Mechanize, an album by Fear Factory
