= Digimortal =

Digimortal may refer to:

- Digimortal (album), a 2001 album by Fear Factory
- Digimortal, a 2004 manga by Tsutomu Nihei
