= Years in the Darkness =

Studio album by Arkaea
- Released: July 14, 2009
- Recorded: 2008–2009
- Genre: Metalcore, groove metal, industrial metal, nu metal
- Length: 62:12
- Label: E1 Music, Century Media Records
- Producer: Christian Olde Wolbers

Singles from Years in the Darkness
- 1. "Locust" Released: June 23, 2009

Professional ratings
Review scores
Source	Rating
AllMusic	3/5 stars
Rock Sound	4/10 stars
Sputnikmusic	2.5/5 stars
About.com	4/5 stars

Years in the Darkness is the first album by metal band Arkaea. It was released on July 14, 2009. A music video for the track "Locust" was made. The album charted at No. 39 on the Billboard Heatseekers Chart with approximately 980 copies sold in its first week.

== Track listing ==
All lyrics are written by Jon Howard; all music is composed by Christian Olde Wolbers and Raymond Herrera, except where noted.

No.	Title	Music	Length
1.	"Locust"		4:26
2.	"Beneath the Shades of Grey"		5:04
3.	"Years in the Darkness"		4:15
4.	"Gone Tomorrow"		4:09
5.	"Awakening"	Pat Kavanagh, Olde Wolbers, Herrera	3:45
6.	"Black Ocean"		4:10
7.	"Break the Silence"		5:07
8.	"Lucid Dream"		3:44
9.	"My Redemption"		4:13
10.	"War Within"		4:15
11.	"The World as One"		4:16
12.	"Rise Today"		4:37
13.	"Away from the Sun"	Howard	5:41

European bonus track
No.	Title	Length
14.	"Blackened Sky"	4:23

== Credits ==
- Jon Howard – vocals, acoustic guitar and piano on "Away from the Sun"
- Christian Olde Wolbers – guitars, keyboards
- Pat Kavanagh – bass
- Raymond Herrera – drums

=== Personnel ===
- Produced by Christian Olde Wolbers
- Co-produced by Threat Signal and Arkaea
- Mixing by Terry Date
- Mastering by Ted Jensen at Sterling Sound
- Artwork by Gustavo Sazes
