= Recharger =

Recharger may refer to:

- Battery charger
- AC adapter
- "Recharger" (song), a song by Fear Factory from The Industrialist
