= Mextremist! Greatest Hits =

Greatest hits album by Brujeria
- Released: October 23, 2001
- Length: 45:17
- Label: Koolarrow
- Producer: Brujeria

Brujeria chronology
Brujerizmo (2000)	Mextremist! Greatest Hits (2001)	The Mexecutioner! – The Best of Brujeria (2003)

Professional ratings
Review scores
Source	Rating
AllMusic	link
Playlouder	3/5 stars

Mextremist! Greatest Hits is the name of a greatest hits album by extreme metal band Brujeria. The album is more like a B-sides compilation, including songs not available on the LPs edited by Roadrunner Records.

== Album information ==
The album cover is a parody of a Mexican magazine called ¡Alarma!, which emphasizes sensational crime stories and has previously been banned—like the band, in certain instances, for its gruesome content/pictures.

The song "Asesino" is by Brujeria, not the artist Asesino. This song features Tony Campos from the band Static-X.

== Track listing ==
1. "Seis Seis Seis" (Six Six Six) – 1:23
2. "Santa Lucía" (Saint Lucy) – 0:21
3. "Sacrificio" (Sacrifice) – 1:22
4. "Machetazos" (Machete Attack) – 1:42
5. "Padre Nuestro" (Our Father) – 2:21
6. "Molestando Niños Muertos" (Molesting Dead Children) – 3:02
7. "Castigo del Brujo" (Punishment of the Warlock) – 1:37
8. "Matando Güeros '97" (Killing Blondes) – 3:12
9. "Narco-Peda" (Narco-Drunkenness) – 2:43
10. "Brujo Cirujano" (Warlock Surgeon) – 1:55
11. "Asesino" (Assassin) – 2:33
12. "Hechando Chingasos [Live '97]" – 3:56
13. "Poseído" (Possessed) – 0:47
14. "Cristo de la Roca" (Christ of the Rock) – 1:06
15. "Papa Capado" (Castrated Pope) – 3:17
16. "Seran Míos Para Siempre [Fantasma Remix]" (They Will Be Mine Forever) – 2:19
17. "Mecosario [Pinche Peach Torsido Remix]" (Cum-ossuary) – 3:33
18. "Marijuana [Escobar Remix]" – 4:24
