= Industrialist (disambiguation) =

An industrialist is a business magnate, an entrepreneur of great influence, importance, or standing in a particular enterprise or field of business.

Industrialist may also refer to:

- The Industrialist, an album by Fear Factory
- "The Industrialist" (song), title track from the album by Fear Factory

== See also ==
- Industrialism
