= Pocho Aztlan =

Studio album by Brujeria
- Released: September 16, 2016
- Genre: Death metal; grindcore; groove metal
- Length: 46:14
- Label: Nuclear Blast
- Producer: Russ Russell, Eddie Casillas, Ross Gonzalez, Huey Dee

Brujeria chronology
Brujerizmo (2000)	Pocho Aztlan (2016)	Esto es Brujeria (2023)

Professional ratings
Review scores
Source	Rating
AllMusic	3.5/5 stars
Blabbermouth.net	9/10
Decibel	8/10
Exclaim!	8/10
Metal Hammer	3.5/5 stars

Pocho Aztlan is the fourth studio album by American extreme metal band Brujeria, released on September 16, 2016, through Nuclear Blast. This is the first full-length studio album by Brujeria since Brujerizmo, marking the longest gap between the band's studio albums. It is also the first release featuring El Cynico, El Sangrón and Cuernito.

Pocho Aztlan marks the return of their older grindcore sound from early releases, like Matando Güeros, while maintaining the groove-oriented sound the band explored in Brujerizmo.

== Track listing ==
All tracks are written by Brujeria, except where noted.

No.	Title	Lyrics	Length
1.	"Pocho Aztlan"		4:10
2.	"No Aceptan Imitaciones" (Accept No Imitations)		3:12
3.	"Profecía del Anticristo" (Antichrist's Prophecy)		4:11
4.	"Ángel de la Frontera" (Angel of the Border)		3:23
5.	"Plata o Plomo" (Money or Lead)		4:04
6.	"Satongo" (portmanteau of "satánico" and "hongo")		3:26
7.	"Isla de la Fantasía" (Fantasy Island)		2:17
8.	"Bruja-" (Witch-)		4:09
9.	"México Campeón" (Mexico Champion)		2:25
10.	"Culpan la Mujer" (They Blame the Woman)		2:48
11.	"Códigos" (Codes)		5:35
12.	"Debilador"		3:21
13.	"California über Aztlan"	Jello Biafra, adaptation by Brujeria	3:13
Total length:			46:14

== Credits ==
Brujeria

- Juan Brujo (Juan Lepe) – lead vocals, songwriting (1, 9, 10)
- Pititis (Gabriela Dominguez) – guitars, backing vocals
- Hongo – guitars, songwriting (2, 4–8, 11, 12)
- El Cynico – bass, backing vocals, songwriting (3)
- Fantasma – bass, backing vocals
- Pinche Peach – samples, backing vocals
- Hongo Jr. – drums (1–11)

Additionnel Personnel

- Juan Ramón Rufino Ramos – vocals/narration (1)
- El Podrido – drums (12, 13)

Songwriting on "California über Aztlan"

- Jello Biafra
- John Greenway
