= Dino Cazares =

American guitarist

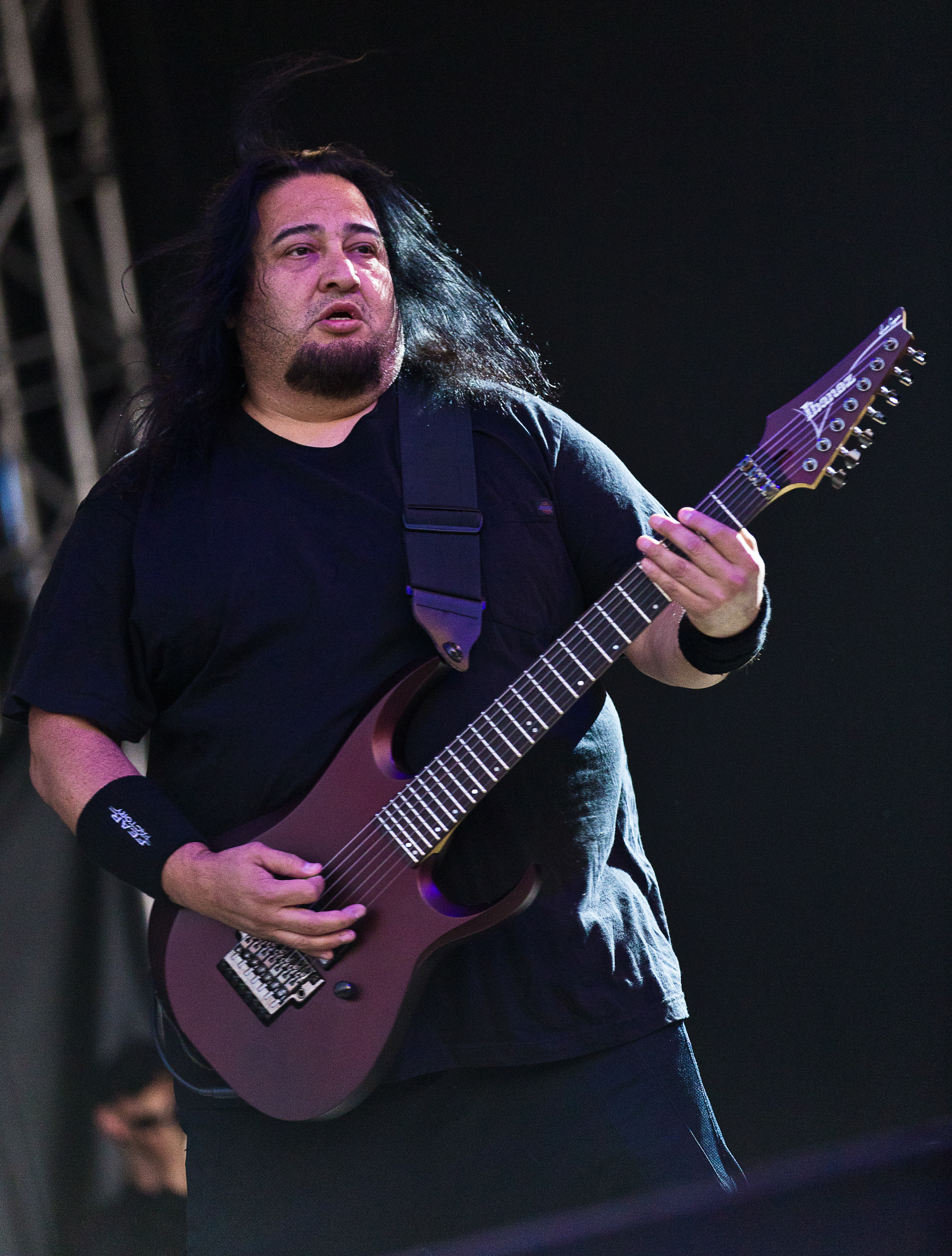
- Cazares performing in 2018

Background information
- Also known as: Asesino
- Born: Dean Albert Maury Cazares; September 2, 1966 (age 60); El Centro, California, U.S.
- Genres: Industrial metal; groove metal; death metal; metalcore; thrash metal
- Occupations: Musician; songwriter
- Instrument: Guitar
- Years active: 1984–present
- Member of: Fear Factory; Asesino; Divine Heresy; Die Klute
- Formerly of: Brujería; BodyBag; Excruciating Terror; Roadrunner United

Dino Cazares (born September 2, 1966) is an American musician, best known as the guitarist and one of the co-founders of industrial metal band Fear Factory. He is also a co-founder of Divine Heresy, Asesino, and Brujeria. Cazares popularized the use of digital amp modelling processors, as well as the use of seven and eight-string guitars in metal music.

== Career ==
Cazares met singer Burton C. Bell in 1989 and started a group under the name Ulceration, which was renamed to their current name Fear Factory in the following year with Raymond Herrera on drums. The band's first album, Soul of a New Machine, was dedicated to Cazares' mother, Natividad, and older brother, Joey. Before starting Fear Factory, Cazares was in the grindcore band Excruciating Terror, which he quit after one month. He co-founded the Mexican death/grind side-project Brujeria, formed in 1989 with members of Faith No More, Fear Factory, among other well-known bands.

When Fear Factory split up (temporarily) in 2002, Cazares returned to Brujeria, and released what was supposed to be the first of 13 Demoniaco Brujeria records (one for each member of Brujeria). He formed the band Asesino the same year, it featured himself with Static-X bassist Tony Campos on bass and vocals, and Emilio Marquez on drums. Fear Factory reformed later that year without Cazares. In 2005, Cazares was chosen as a team captain by Roadrunner A&R Monte Conner for the Roadrunner United album for which he wrote four songs and contributed with other Roadrunner Records artists.

Cazares formed Divine Heresy in 2005, who released their debut album Bleed the Fifth in August 2007. The band got signed to Roadrunner Records and Century Media, and included Tim Yeung (All That Remains, Hate Eternal, Nile, Vital Remains, Morbid Angel) on drums, Thomas Cummings on vocals and (later on) Joe Payne (Nile) on bass. Cummings was terminated from the band in 2008 and was replaced by Travis Neal. Their second album Bringer of Plagues was released on July 28, 2009.

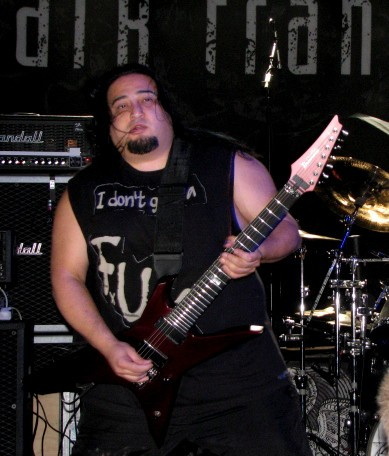
Cazares in 2008

In 2009, Cazares rejoined Fear Factory and has released four albums with them since. Divine Heresy has been inactive due to Cazares' commitment to Fear Factory and several departures that took place.

Cazares has voiced a minor character in the Adult Swim TV show Metalocalypse.

In January 2019, Cazares announced his divorce from Jennifer Pagan Cazares on Twitter.

Starting in August 2021, Cazares toured with Soulfly as their guitar player. He continued to play with Soulfly for their 35-date tour from February through March 2022.

=== Reformation of Fear Factory ===
Dino Cazares (Fear Factory) on stage in Munich on 24th of November 2023

On April 7, 2009, Cazares and ex-bandmate Burton C. Bell announced the reconciliation of their friendship, and the formation of a new project with Byron Stroud (Strapping Young Lad) on bass and Gene Hoglan (Death, Strapping Young Lad, Dethklok) on drums. On April 28, this project was revealed to actually be a new version of Fear Factory, minus founding member Raymond Herrera and longtime member Christian Olde Wolbers. Bell, when asked why Herrera and Wolbers were not included, stated that "Fear Factory's like a business and I'm just reorganizing...We won't talk about [their exclusion]."

== Technique and style ==
Cazares is often identified by his fast alternate picking rhythm guitar technique, timing palm muted triplets and syncopated sixteenth notes with double bass drumming. Cazares said in 2022 that inspiration struck when he first heard the "machine gun" riffs in "One" by Metallica, which led to a distinctive style identifiable in the music of Fear Factory. In previous albums of the band, Cazares did not play any guitar solos in Fear Factory for stylistic reasons but can be heard playing them in his other bands. However, the band's 2010 album, Mechanize, has several lead parts and solos.

== Equipment ==
Cazares is known for playing Ibanez guitars, using custom-made 7-string models with Seymour Duncan Blackout pickups. They were usually detuned a whole step (A,D,G,C,F,A,D; from Obsolete onwards) to allow for even lower registers. His main guitar in Asesino is an Ibanez prototype 8-string guitar (standard tuning F#,B,E,A,D,G,B,E) with 2 Seymour Duncan Blackout 8 active pickups. Before using Ibanez guitars, his main instrument was a black custom shop ESP M 6-string guitar with a single EMG 81 in the bridge, detuned to B tuning. This can be seen in the video for the song "Replica". His first known Ibanez 7-string was an Ibanez Universe UV7SBK "Silver Dot", with a modified pickguard to fit a single passive pickup and a volume knob. He was also known to have an Ibanez Universe UV777BK with similar modifications, except with an EMG 7-string prototype instead of a passive pickup.

In January 2015, Ibanez announced a signature model for Dino Cazares, the DCM100. It is based on the Ibanez RGD platform, including the 26.5in scale, but features a mahogany body, maple neck with bubinga strip, offset dot inlays, Lo-Pro Edge tremolo, and a single Seymour Duncan Retribution pickup. This guitar makes Cazares one of only 4 Ibanez signature artists to have a signature 7-string guitar.

In February 2020, Cazares revealed that due to the legal lawsuits that were happening in Fear Factory at the time, he was forced to leave his endorsement with Ibanez after being with the company for 22 years. He announced a new partnership with Ormsby Guitars, a company based in Perth, Australia, as well as a line of signature models; two of these being revealed at the 2019 Winter NAMM Show.

In the early days, his guitar tone derived from a modified Marshall JCM800 head with scooped mids and high treble settings to produce the thrashy, chugging tone that has been so influential to the metal genre. After it was stolen, he switched to the Line 6 POD Pro with a Mesa/Boogie tube power amp. This setup was used to record Digimortal. Cazares later endorsed the Line 6 Vetta II HD, as well as a POD X3 Pro processor into a Mesa/Boogie tube power amp and Mesa/Boogie oversized Rectifier 4x12 cabinets. When playing live, Cazares mostly uses the speaker cabinets for monitoring, or does not use them at all, since his signal is also run into the venue's PA. In 2011, Cazares replaced the POD X3 Pro for the POD HD Pro. He also replaced his Mesa/Boogie tube power amp for a Matrix GT800FX 800W solid state power amp, and his Mesa/Boogie Rectifier 4x12 for a custom cabinet built by David Laboga. Sometime in 2012 or 2013, Cazares eventually switched from Line 6 to Fractal Audio, making use of their Axe-FX II. This was short lived, as he would soon switch to using a Kemper Profiler, an amplifier that could "profile" other guitar amps, allowing him to get a tone similar to previous albums.

With Divine Heresy, he used an old Marshall Valvestate VS100 head, Marshall JCM800, and a Peavey 5150 head boosted with an Ibanez TS-9.

In 2007, Cazares switched from EMG active pickups to Seymour Duncan AHB-1 Blackout active pickups, which he helped design with Duncan. In 2014, Seymour Duncan announced the Blackout Retribution pickups, which are a signature set of pickups designed with less output and more treble than a standard Blackout set.

=== Guitar rig and signal flow ===
A detailed gear diagram of Dino Cazares' 2001 Fear Factory guitar rig is well-documented.

== Discography ==
=== Nailbomb ===
- Point Blank (1994)

=== Asesino ===
- Corridos de Muerte (2002)
- Cristo Satanico (2006)

=== Fear Factory ===
==== Studio albums ====
- Soul of a New Machine (1992)
- Demanufacture (1995)
- Obsolete (1998)
- Digimortal (2001)
- Mechanize (2010)
- The Industrialist (2012)
- Genexus (2015)
- Aggression Continuum (2021)
- Roboticist (2027)

==== EP ====
- Fear Is the Mindkiller (1993)

==== Demo ====
- Concrete (2002)

==== Compilations ====
- Hatefiles (2003)
- The Best of Fear Factory (2006)

=== Brujeria ===
==== Studio albums ====
- Matando Güeros (1993)
- Raza Odiada (1995)
- Brujerizmo (2000)

==== EPs ====
- ¡Demoniaco! (1990)
- ¡Machetazos! (1992)
- El Patrón (1994)
- Marijuana (2000)

=== Divine Heresy ===
- Bleed the Fifth (2007)
- Bringer of Plagues (2009)

=== Die Klute ===
- Planet Fear (2019)

=== Roadrunner United ===
- Roadrunner United (2005)

=== Atari Teenage Riot ===
- 60 Second Wipe Out (1999)

=== Strife ===
- In This Defiance (1997)

=== Junkie XL ===
- Saturday Teenage Kick (1997)
- Big Sounds of the Drags (1999)

=== Soulfly ===
- Soulfly (1998)
- Chama (2025)

=== Cypress Hill ===
- Skull & Bones (2000)
