= Joey Muha =

Canadian drummer

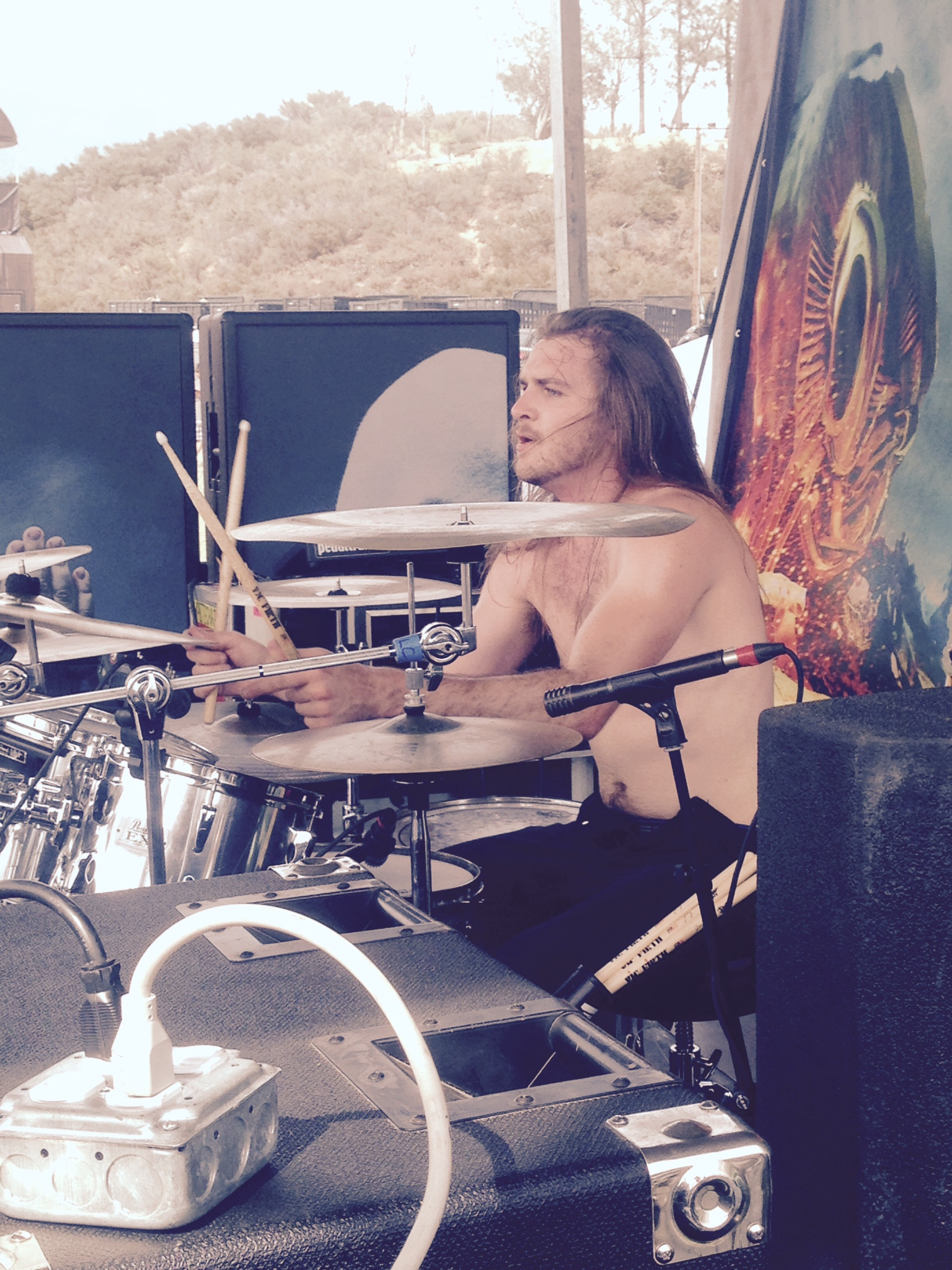
- Muha performing with Jungle Rot at Mayhem Festival 2015

Background information
- Born: Joseph Douglas Muha; July 15, 1992 (age 34)
- Origin: Port Dover, Ontario, Canada
- Genres: Groove metal, death metal, thrash metal, progressive metal, pop, pop rock, metalcore
- Instruments: Drums
- Years active: 2006–present
- Labels: Nuclear Blast, Victory Records

Joseph Douglas Muha is a Canadian drummer, best known for his YouTube videos, many of which have millions of views and have been featured on multiple websites. He is a member of the industrial metal band Threat Signal, death metal band Jungle Rot. and pop band Liteyears. He has also played for bands associated with Nuclear Blast Records, Victory Records, MapleMusic Recordings, etc.

== Biography ==
Muha grew up in a small beach town in Southern Ontario named Port Dover. He started playing drums around the age of 14 and has been playing in bands ever since. He initially started playing with his older brother, Willie, and has since moved on to different bands. He was taught by his local drum teacher, Adam Reid, for a brief period and then continued on his own. He has been recognized as covering a wide variety of genres and styles of drumming.

== History ==
Muha played with the band Our Lady of Bloodshed from 2009 through 2014. From 2011 through 2014, he played with Hamilton, Ontario, progressive death metal band OPTICS, recording on their self-released self-titled EP in 2011.

Muha got his first taste of U.S. touring while playing drums with Victory Records artist Farewell to Freeway during their 2011 U.S. tour.

In 2012, Muha joined Nuclear Blast Records death metal band Threat Signal. During this time he also played with Cornwall, Ontario, metalcore band Cynicist, appearing in their 2013 music video for "Ashes Remain," and filling in throughout their 2014 East coast tour.

In June 2015, Muha announced that he would leave Threat Signal to join the ranks of Victory Records death metal artist Jungle Rot full-time, immediately after which the band began recording their eighth studio album, Order Shall Prevail, featuring Muha on the drums. Muha spent the summer of 2015 playing with Jungle Rot on the Victory Records stage for the entirety of the 2015 Rockstar Energy Drink Mayhem Festival.

In August 2015, Muha announced his departure from Jungle Rot. Muha has since returned to playing with Threat Signal, as well as with Sumo Cyco.

He played with Atheist in 2019.

== Muha's equipment ==
Muha is currently endorsed by Vic Firth Drumsticks, MEElectronics, Protection Racket, Gibraltar Hardware and Sabian Cymbals. He uses Yamaha Drums, Vic Firth Drumsticks, Sabian Cymbals, Trick Pedals, Gibraltar Hardware, MEEaudio monitors and Yamaha electronics.

=== Current tour kit ===
- Drums Yamaha Recording Custom Series Kit
  - 10"X9" Tom
  - 12"x10" Tom
  - 16"x14" Floor Tom
  - 18"x16" Floor Tom
  - 22"x18" Bass Drum
  - 14"x5.5" Snare Drum
- Cymbals Sabian and Zildjian
  - 14" Sabian HHX Stage Hi Hats
  - 16" Sabian HHX Stage Crash
  - 17" Sabian HHXplosion Crash
  - 18" Sabian AAX Chinese
  - 18" Sabian AAX Chinese Brilliant
  - 19" Sabian AAX Dark Crash
  - 20" Zildjian Scimitar Ride
- Drumheads – Evans
  - Toms: EC2 Clear
  - Bass: EMAD
  - Snare: Genera HD-Dry batter – Hazy 300 Clear resonant
- Other
  - Roland TD-3 Electronic Percussion Module and RT-10 trigger
  - Trick Dominator Pedals
  - Vic Firth X5BN American Hickory drumsticks
  - MEEaudio M6 PRO monitors
