= Vigilance (album) =

Studio album by Threat Signal
- Released: September 9, 2009 (North America); September 11, 2009 (Europe)
- Recorded: November 2008 – March 2009
- Studios: Hamilton, Ontario, Canada
- Genres: Metalcore, melodic death metal, groove metal
- Length: 54:45
- Label: Nuclear Blast
- Producer: Jon Howard

Threat Signal chronology
Under Reprisal (2006)	Vigilance (2009)	Threat Signal (2011)

Singles from Vigilance
- 1. "Through My Eyes" Released: August 25, 2009

Professional ratings
Review scores
Source	Rating
AllMusic	3/5 stars

Vigilance is the second official full-length studio album by the Canadian melodic death metal band Threat Signal, released three years after their first album Under Reprisal. It was produced by Jon Howard. The album shifted some 1,100 copies in its first week of sale in the US.

== Track listing ==
All lyrics are written by Jon Howard; all music is composed by Threat Signal except where noted.

No.	Title	Music	Length
1.	"Afterlife"		4:06
2.	"Through My Eyes"		4:35
3.	"The Beginning of the End"		4:01
4.	"United We Stand"		4:21
5.	"Beyond Recognition"	Kyle McKnight, Rich Howard	4:06
6.	"Another Source of Light"		4:53
7.	"Hate Machine"		3:37
8.	"Severed"		3:18
9.	"Lost"		5:04
10.	"Revision"		3:10
11.	"In Repair"	McKnight, R. Howard	3:28
12.	"Escape from Reality"		4:20
13.	"To Remember"		5:49

== Personnel ==
- Jon Howard – vocals, keyboards, additional guitar
- Travis Montgomery – guitars
- Adam Weber – guitars
- Pat Kavanagh – bass
- Norman Killeen – drums

Production

- Produced by Jon Howard
- Co-produced by Threat Signal
- Mixing and mastering by Greg Reely
- Art direction by Jon Howard & Norman Killeen
- Artwork by Norman Killeen for NME studios
