= Raza Odiada =

Studio album by Brujeria
- Released: August 22, 1995
- Recorded: 1995
- Genres: Grindcore; death metal; groove metal; sludge metal
- Length: 40:12
- Label: Roadrunner
- Producer: Asesino

Brujeria chronology
Matando Güeros (1993)	Raza Odiada (1995)	Spanglish 101 (1999)

Professional ratings
Review scores
Source	Rating
AllMusic	link
Chronicles of Chaos	9/10
CMJ	(favorable)
Collector's Guide to Heavy Metal	5/10
Kerrang!	3/5 stars

Raza Odiada (English: Hated Race) is the second album by Brujeria. Brujeria's main concepts are Satanism, revolution, pro-illegal immigration, narcotics, drug smuggling, and other related themes.

== Reception ==
- NME (10/28/95, p. 56) - 8 (out of 10) - "[a] nugget... Brujeria are a Chicano hardcore band who sing in Spanish. Short and brutal, the assault begins with a scathing attack on California governor Pete Wilson's Proposition 187 - which stopped Mexican and South American immigrants in the state from receiving welfare, medical care and education."

== Track listing ==
1. "Raza Odiada (Pito Wilson)" – 3:30 ("Hated Race ["Dick" Wilson]")
2. "Colas de Rata"– 1:33 ("Rat Tails")
3. "Hechando Chingasos (Greñudos Locos II)" – 3:34 ("Throwing Punches [Crazy Headbangers II]")
4. "La Migra (Cruza la Frontera II)" – 1:43 ("La Migra [Border Crossing II]")
5. "Revolución" – 3:18 ("Revolution")
6. "Consejos Narcos" – 2:39 ("Drug Dealer Advice")
7. "Almas de Venta" – 2:12 ("Souls for Sale")
8. "La Ley del Plomo" – 2:45 ("The Law of Lead")
9. "Los Tengo Colgando (Chingo de Mecos II)" – 1:48 ("I Have Them Hanging [Load of Cum II]")
10. "Sesos Humanos (Sacrificio IV)" – 1:15 ("Human Brains [Sacrifice IV]")
11. "Primer Meco" – 1:15 ("First Cum")
12. "El Patrón" – 3:42 ("The Boss")
13. "Hermanos Menendez" – 2:05 ("Menendez Brothers")
14. "Padre Nuestro" – 2:07 ("Our Father")
15. "Ritmos Satánicos" – 6:51 ("Satanic Rhythms")

== Personnel ==
- Juan Brujo - vocals
- Asesino - guitars, bass
- Güero Sin Fe - bass, guitars
- Fantasma - bass, vocals
- Hongo - bass, guitars, drums
- Greñudo - drums
- Pinche Peach - vocals
- JR. Hozicon - direction
