= Devils to Some, Angels to Others =

Studio album by Fashion Bomb
- Released: August 2006
- Recorded: Chicago, IL
- Genre: Industrial metal, industrial rock
- Label: Full Effect Records
- Producer: Jamie Duffy

Fashion Bomb chronology
Devils to Some, Angels to Others (2008)	“Visions of the Lifted Veil” (2009)

Devils to Some, Angels to Others is the debut studio album by American industrial band Fashion Bomb. The album was originally released in August 2006 through independent label Superdead Records. Jamie Duffy of Acumen Nation and DJ Accuccrack? produced. In addition, Trevor Sadler of Mastermind Studios (NIN, SOiL) mastered the tracks, and Stephen Jensen of F3 Studios was brought on board to create the challenging album art.

After signing with Detroit and Los Angeles based Full Effect Records, the album was re-released with a bonus track re-mixed by DJ Asrock of Final Cut in September 2008.

== Track listing ==
1. "SS”
2. "Nothing"
3. "Low"
4. "Avarice"
5. "Rant"
6. "God Drug"
7. "The Line"
8. "Ascend This Day"
9. "Drugpool"
10. "Skin"
11. "Over It"
12. "Christ Puncher"
13. "Mold"
14. "Looks That Kill"
15. "Low(Asrock’s High Mix)" [Bonus Remix featured on Full Effect Records reissue]
