= Roboticist (album) =

Studio album by Fear Factory
- Released: April 9, 2027
- Recorded: 2025–2026
- Length: 49:30
- Label: Nuclear Blast

Fear Factory chronology
Recoded (2022)	Roboticist (2027)

Fear Factory studio album chronology
Aggression Continuum (2021)	Roboticist (2027)

Singles from Roboticist
- 1. "Roboticist" Released: August 29, 2026; 2. "Detonizer" Released: November 10, 2026

Roboticist is the upcoming eleventh studio album by American industrial metal band Fear Factory, to be released on April 9, 2027. It will be the band's first album to feature vocalist Milo Silvestro and drummer Pete Webber (replacing Burton C. Bell and Mike Heller respectively), in addition to bassist Tony Campos, who had joined Fear Factory in 2015 but makes his studio debut on this album.

== Background and recording ==
Fear Factory's tenth studio album, Aggression Continuum, was released in 2021 to mostly mixed-to-positive reviews, and marked the last to feature original vocalist Burton C. Bell, who had left the band in September 2020, yet his vocals (which had been recorded as early as 2017) were kept on the album. The next two years left Fear Factory unable to tour behind Aggression Continuum, due to the COVID-19 pandemic and the lack of a lead singer. After auditioning over 300 singers, during which guitarist Dino Cazares had expressed an open interest in hiring a woman, the band announced Milo Silvestro as Bell's replacement on February 21, 2023. Three months later, Fear Factory announced that Pete Webber of Havok was replacing Mike Heller as their drummer.

After spending most of 2023 and 2024 on tour supporting Aggression Continuum, the band officially entered the studio on April 21, 2025, to begin recording their next album. Cazares later confirmed that the album was planned for a 2026 release. The band's first song in five years, and first single with Silvestro on vocals and Webber on drums, "Roboticist", was released on August 29, 2026. A follow-up single, "Detonizer", was released on November 10, 2026; on the same day, Fear Factory announced Roboticist as the title of their upcoming eleventh studio album and that it will be released on April 9, 2027.

== Track listing ==
Roboticist track listing
No.	Title	Length
1.	"Roboticist"	3:29
2.	"Decentralisation"	4:40
3.	"Detonizer"	4:20
4.	"Eradicator"	3:25
5.	"Welcome to the Factory"	4:35
6.	"Unsynthesizable"	5:36
7.	"No Blood No Flesh"	5:36
8.	"Synthetic Savior"	4:19
9.	"Neural Infection Scanner"	4:58
10.	"De-Extinction"	4:58
11.	"Fragments"	3:34
Total length:		49:30

== Personnel ==
=== Fear Factory ===
- Milo Silvestro – vocals
- Dino Cazares – guitars
- Tony Campos – bass
- Pete Webber – drums
