= Farewell to Freeway =

Canadian metalcore band

- Also known as: F2F, Farewell to Freeway
- Origin: Guelph, Ontario, Canada
- Genres: Metalcore, melodic hardcore, post-hardcore
- Years active: 2000–2016
- Labels: Victory Records; Year of the Sun Records
- Spinoffs: Islands & Empires; The Hot Karl; The SICness; Rich Gregor; Trouble & Daughte; Ben McKenzie & his Broken Bones
- Past members: Chris Lambert; Drew Harwood; Adam Lambert; Richie Gregor; Michele Walter; Kyle Amos; Adam Linka; Josh Hudman; Bryan Nunn; Michael Farina; Joey Muha
- Website: www.myspace.com/farewelltofreeway

Farewell to Freeway was a Canadian metalcore band from Guelph, Ontario.

== History ==
=== Early years (2000–2003) ===
Initially formed as a punk trio going by the name Freeway in 2000, the band consisted of Chris Lambert on guitar and vocals with bassist Josh Hudman and drummer Richie Gregor. The band released a 5-song EP, You or Someone Like You in 2000, with limited pressing. The band released its second EP, Shadybrook Sessions in 2001, with a notably more alternative feel than the first album while still keeping a punk vibe. The album was produced by Scott Komer (Boysnightout, Pettit Project) at his Parkhill Project Studio in Oakville, Ontario. In 2002, shortly after the release of Shadybrook Sessions, Hudman left the band and was replaced by Adam Lambert, brother of Chris. The trio was forced to change their name due to conflict with a rap artist with the same moniker, and Farewell to Freeway was officially born.

=== Year of the Sun Records (2003–2007) ===
With the success of Shadybrook Sessions, the band signed to local label Year of the Sun before releasing their first full-length album, Between Yesterday and Today. The album was produced by Justin Koop (Silverstein, Grade, Jersey) at The Music Gym in Burlington, Ontario. Chris and Richie provided vocals for the album, with Chris providing all the screaming. With the new album released, the band brought on second guitarist Bryan Nunn to fill out their sound. With their first full-length disc and a fourth member, the band embarked on their first Canadian tour in support of the album.

On June 15, 2004, the band released their first EP as a quartet, Weekdays Seldom Wake to Victory. The release, recorded in the home studio of Simon Vanderzand, offered a notably heavier sound, with the transition to Adam screaming and a noted increase in the presence of screaming. The band released the title track as their first single, accompanied by their first video.

With their second release on Year of the Sun, the band returned to touring, including a cross-Canada journey with Ottawa locals Driving July. In early 2005, Nunn was forced out of the band due to personal and musical differences. Band merch girl/roadie, Michele Walter joined the band, providing keyboards, which helped fill out the band's sound. After the split of tour mates Driving July, Driving July guitarist Drew Harwood filled the guitarist position. The song "Promises of the Gods" was recorded between EPs and featured on the soundtrack for the independent film Desperate Souls. The release was accompanied by a video and was featured on their third Year of the Sun release.

The band's third and final release on Year of the Sun was on April 11, 2006, with In These Wounds, produced by Mike Borkosky at the Vault in Toronto, Ontario. The album offered a noted maturity in the band's sound, bringing a cleaner more directed approach to their craft and was the defining release for the band which finally captured the sound and style they had been striving for. The band released one single with accompanying video for title track, "In These Wounds". This being the last release on Year of the Sun Records it was toured heavily and garnered the band more and more attention and headlining shows/tours.

=== Victory Records (2007–2012) ===
In 2007, the band was still touring heavily for the In These Wounds EP when they were featured in Alternative Press magazine as one of the "Unsigned Bands of the Month". They were contacted by Victory Records of Chicago, Illinois. The band was asked to play for the staff and owner, received great reviews and were signed with the Label in July 2007—the 6th Canadian band to sign with the label since its inception.

Farewell to Freeway released their album Definitions on February 19, 2008, produced by Eric Arena (A Day to Remember, He Is Legend) at ZING Studios in Westfield, Massachusetts. The album led to two singles, "Sound Minds" and "The Desperate Age". "Sound Minds" received rotation on MTV in the US and Much Music in Canada. Keyboardist Michele Walter was later featured in Revolver magazine's "Hottest Chicks in Metal" issues—first in August 2007 and then in June 2008.

The sophomore album on Victory came on April 14, 2009 with the release of Only Time Will Tell, produced by Paul Leavitt (Darkest Hour, The Bled, Senses Fail) at Valencia Recording Studio, in Baltimore, Maryland. The album led to one single, "Portrait", which received play on MTV and Much Music.

2009–2010 saw changes with the band's line-up, as Richie Gregor left the band in October 2009 to pursue other interests and take a break from touring. He was replaced by Michael Farina. The band continued to tour for the majority of the two years between releases. During recording of their third Victory album, Michele left the band to pursue meaningful employment, but the band felt that there was no need to replace her.

On January 18, 2011, the band released their third album on Victory Records, Filthy Habits, produced again by Eric Arena, with assistant engineers J. Wildes, Jay Deluca, and Joe Mahoney, recorded at Eagle Rock Studios in Pittsfield, Vermont. This marked the first release from the band as a quartet since Weekdays Seldom Wake to Victory, and the first without founding drummer, Richie Gregor, leaving Chris Lambert as the sole founding member remaining in the band and further compromising the sound. The release produced the singles, "Liquor? I Don't Even Know 'Er", and "Inside Influence". Though recorded with Adam playing bass, Adam began to focus solely on vocals in performance. Kyle Amos, Gregor's cousin, filled Adam's spot on bass, though he was not listed as an official member of the band. With Filthy Habits, Farewell to Freeway went for more of a raw stripped down approach creating a faster, riff heavy, and aggressive album. Shortly after the release, drummer Michael Farina left the band, although he continued to appear in videos and photo shoots, and occasionally filled in on shows. He was replaced with touring drummer Adam Linka and the band toured Ontario through 2012.

=== Disbandment (2013–2016) ===
In 2016, the blogger Ontariorock reported that Farewell to Freeway had "called it quits", and the band stopped posting on Twitter that year. There was a reunion concert in Guelph in April 2017, but the band reported on its Facebook page that the members had moved on and joined other bands.

=== Recent years (2016–present) ===
On March 26, 2016, founding band members Chris Lambert, Kyle Amos, and Richie Gregor released a single titled Mania under the new band name of Islands & Empires. They recorded at Atlantis Studios in Hamilton, Ontario with producer and engineer Donny Levasseur. In 2019, Islands & Empires toured across Canada on The Grim Spring Tour presented by The Foundation Agency, with co-headlining bands Her Majesty The King, and Falset.

== Band members ==
- Adam Lambert - bass, vocals (2002–2010), lead vocals (2006–2016)
- Chris Lambert - clean vocals, guitar (2000–2016)
- Drew Harwood - guitar (2004–2016)
- Kyle Amos - bass (2010–2016)
- Richie Gregor - drums, backing vocals (2000–2009)
- Michele Walter - keyboards, backing vocals (2005–2010)
- Adam Linka - drums (2012–2016)
- Josh Hudman - bass (2000–2002)
- Bryan Nunn - guitar (2003–2005)
- Michael Farina - drums (2009–2011)
- Joey Muha - drums (2011)

== Discography ==
=== Releases ===
- You or Someone Like You EP - 2000 (independent)
- Shadybrook Sessions EP - 2001 (independent)
- Between Yesterday and Today LP - 2003 (Year of the Sun)
- Weekdays Seldom Wake to Victory EP - 2004 (Year of the Sun)
- In These Wounds EP - 2006 (Year of the Sun)
- Definitions LP - 2008 (Victory Records)
- Only Time Will Tell - 2009 (Victory Records)
- Filthy Habits - 2011 (Victory Records)

=== Contributions ===
- "Promises of the Gods" - Desperate Souls Original Motion Picture Soundtrack (2005)
- "In These Wounds" - The Best of Taste of Chaos Two (2007)
