= Genexus (album) =

Studio album by Fear Factory
- Released: August 7, 2015
- Recorded: 2014−2015
- Genres: Industrial metal; groove metal
- Length: 47:55
- Label: Nuclear Blast
- Producers: Fear Factory; Rhys Fulber; Andy Sneap

Fear Factory chronology
The Industrialist (2012)	Genexus (2015)	Aggression Continuum (2021)

Singles from Genexus
- 1. "Soul Hacker" Released: June 21, 2015; 2. "Protomech" Released: July 13, 2015; 3. "Dielectric" Released: July 24, 2015

Genexus is the ninth studio album by American industrial metal band Fear Factory, released on August 7, 2015. It is the third Fear Factory album since guitarist Dino Cazares rejoined the band in 2009, their first album to feature drummer Mike Heller, and the penultimate album to feature vocalist Burton C. Bell before his departure from the band in 2020. His final vocal contributions appear on the band's next album, Aggression Continuum, which was initially recorded in 2017 but not released until four years later. Genexus is also Fear Factory's first release through Nuclear Blast. Upon its release, the album received positive reviews from critics.

A lyric video for the song "Soul Hacker" was released on June 17. A lyric video for the song "Protomech" was released on July 11. A full music video for the song "Dielectric" was released on August 7, the same day as the album release, and a music video for "Expiration Date" was released on April 12, 2016.

== Sound and production ==
Regarding the drums on Genexus, Burton C. Bell stated: "...This time we are gonna use a live drummer, we're gonna use Mike Heller to record a few of the songs, not all of them, but a few to get that live feel, because some of these songs require a live feel, and so we're gonna go with that."

Like its predecessor The Industrialist and Demanufacture, Genexus is a concept album. The themes in the album include war, climate change, religion, and mortality.

== Reception ==
Professional ratings
Aggregate scores
Source	Rating
Metacritic	71/100
Review scores
Source	Rating
About.com	4.5/5 stars
AllMusic	3.5/5 stars
AntiHero Magazine	8/10
Blabbermouth.net	8/10
Metal Injection	8.5/10
The Metal Review	5/5 stars
Sputnikmusic	3.7/5

Genexus received a positive response by critics, praising the album for its brutal and abrasive sound. Ray Van Horn Jr. of Blabbermouth.net said that "the key and industrial supplements gives Genexus a busier and heartier personality, lighting up the album's prospectus of mankind transitioning toward a more mechanized state of being." Trey Spencer of Sputnikmusic surmised that "this album is more melodic and accessible, Dino Cazares and Burton C. Bell prove that they still have what it takes to make a visceral Fear Factory album." James Christopher Monger of AllMusic commented that "more melody-driven than prior outings, Genexus nevertheless retains the band's penchant for pairing bleak science fiction imagery with piston-like, palm-muted guitar riffs and explosive percussion."

== Touring ==
Between the end of August and the middle of September in 2015, the ensemble had toured the Southern, Midwestern, and Southwestern United States along with Once Human, Los Angeles metal band Before the Mourning, and Chicago rock/metal band The Bloodline.

== Track listing ==
All lyrics are written by Burton C. Bell; all music is composed by Dino Cazares.

No.	Title	Length
1.	"Autonomous Combat System"	5:28
2.	"Anodized"	4:47
3.	"Dielectric"	4:19
4.	"Soul Hacker"	3:12
5.	"Protomech"	4:56
6.	"Genexus"	4:48
7.	"Church of Execution"	3:21
8.	"Regenerate"	4:02
9.	"Battle for Utopia"	4:14
10.	"Expiration Date"	8:48
Total length:		47:55

Limited digipak bonus tracks
No.	Title	Length
11.	"Mandatory Sacrifice" (Genexus Remix)	5:43
12.	"Enhanced Reality"	5:36
Total length:		59:14

Japanese edition bonus track
No.	Title	Writer(s)	Length
13.	"Maximum Voltage Capacitor" (Dielectric Remix)	Bell, Cazares	4:18

== Personnel ==
Fear Factory

- Burton C. Bell – vocals
- Dino Cazares – guitars, bass
- Mike Heller – drums (1–3, 5–9)

Production

- Fear Factory – production
- Drew Fulk – vocal production
- Mike Plotnikoff – drum engineering
- Matt Jefferson – Castronovo's drum engineering & editing
- Andy Sneap – mixing, mastering
- Anthony Clarkson – artwork, layout
- Geoff Bisente – additional vocal recording & editing
- Rhys Fulber – programming, keyboards (3, 4, 6, 8–12), co-production, manipulation, vocal recording
- Damien Rainaud – additional keyboards & programming, engineering, editing, pre-production, pre-production mixing, vocals recording
- Giuseppe "Dualized" Bassi – additional keyboards, sampling & programming
- Laurent Tardy – piano (1 & 5)
- Sam "Mister Sam" Shearon – spoken word (1 & 10)
- Deen Castronovo – drums (4)
- Al Jourgensen – remix (11)

== Charts ==
Chart (2015)	Peak position
Australian Albums (ARIA)	15
Austrian Albums (Ö3 Austria)	25
Belgian Albums (Ultratop Flanders)	35
Belgian Albums (Ultratop Wallonia)	59
Canadian Albums (Billboard)	36
Czech Albums (ČNS IFPI)	42
Dutch Albums (Album Top 100)	34
Finnish Albums (Suomen virallinen lista)	25
French Albums (SNEP)	55
German Albums (Offizielle Top 100)	17
Hungarian Albums (MAHASZ)	18
Irish Albums (IRMA)	84
Scottish Albums (Official Charts)	30
Swiss Albums (Schweizer Hitparade)	18
UK Albums (Official Charts)	31
UK Independent Albums (Official Charts)	3
UK Rock & Metal Albums (Official Charts)	2
US Billboard 200	37
