= Brujeria (band) =

American extreme metal band

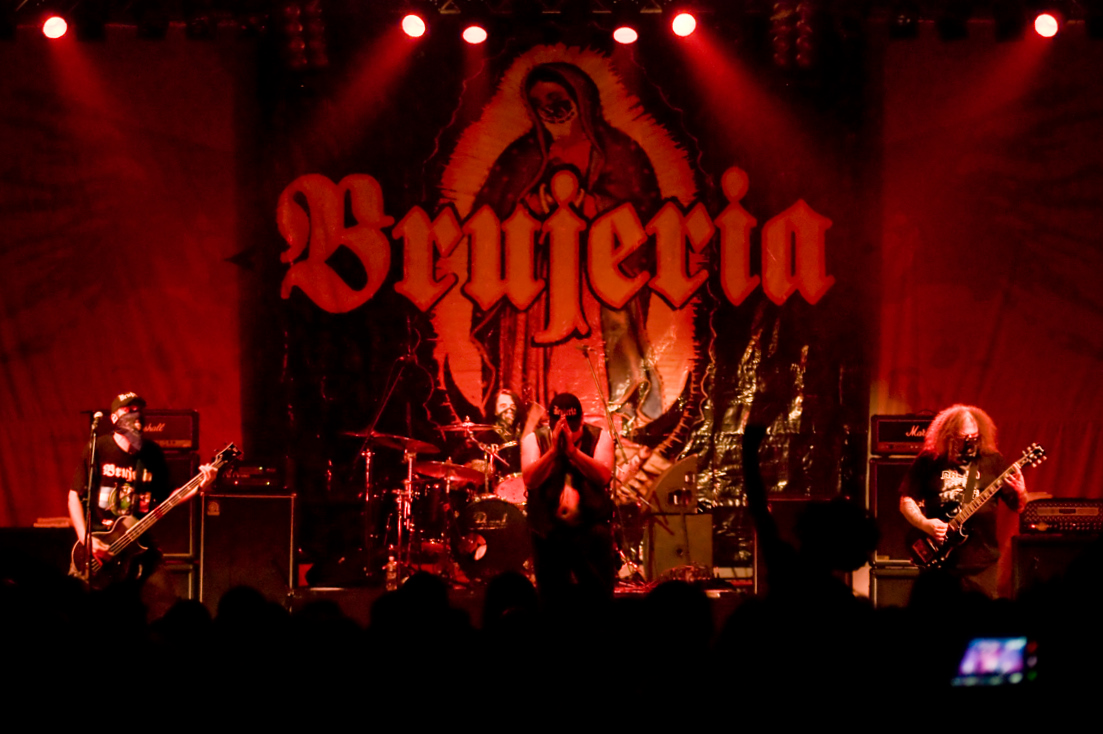
- Brujeria performing at the 2009 Sziget Festival

Background information
- Origin: Los Angeles, California, U.S.
- Genres: Death metal; grindcore; groove metal
- Years active: 1989–present
- Labels: Alternative Tentacles; Koolarrow; Roadrunner; Nuclear Blast
- Members: Fantasma; Hongo; El Sangrón; El Criminal; La Bruja Encabronada; Zangano; El Sativo
- Past members: Asesino; Güero Sin Fe; Greñudo; El Embrujado; Podrido; Maldito X; Cristo de Pisto; El Angelito; El Sadistico; Jr. Hozicon; Pititis; El Cynico; Antonio "Toy" Hernández; Hongo Jr.; Pinche Peach; Juan Brujo
- Website: brujeria.com

Brujeria (Spanish pronunciation: [bɾuxeˈɾi.a]) is an American extreme metal band formed in Los Angeles, California in 1989. The band's Spanish lyrics deal with immigration, narcotics smuggling, and politics. Brujeria portrays Mexican imagery, with several members being Hispanic and Latino Americans, while the band's name derives from brujería (Spanish for "witchcraft").

Former Brujeria members include Raymond Herrera, Billy Gould, Nick Barker, Jeff Walker and Shane Embury. They perform under pseudonyms and portray themselves as a Latino band consisting of drug lords, concealing their identities due to being wanted by the FBI. In videos and photographs of the band, they are shown wearing bandanas, balaclavas, serapes, and are often shown wielding machetes.

== History ==
=== Formation and early releases (1989–1992) ===
Brujeria was formed at a party in 1989 with the goal of creating a grindcore and death metal band representative of the Latino/Chicano community. Its members, guitarist Dino Cazares, Jello Biafra, drummer Pat Hoed, bass guitarist Billy Gould and vocalist Juan Brujo, used pseudonyms as most were in other known bands.

Their first single, "¡Demoniaco!", was released in 1990. In 1992, "Machetazos" was released. Jello Biafra departed the group, Pinche Peach< was introduced as an additional vocalist, and Raymond Herrera took over drums while Pat Hoed, the band's former drummer, became a second vocalist. "Machetazos" and "El Patrón" (1994) were produced and distributed through Jello Biafra's record label Alternative Tentacles.

The band was criticized from its inception for its lyrics about drugs, sex and Satanism. These topics, characteristic of many other death metal acts, were inspired by Adolfo Constanzo, a Cuban-American-born Mexican drug smuggler, practitioner of Palo Mayombe and serial killer.

=== Matando Güeros and controversy (1993–1994) ===
The cover of their first album, Matando Güeros (1993), which featured a severed head being held by a hand, was controversial. The image of the head became the band's mascot, El Coco Loco ("mad/crazy bogeyman" or "mad/crazy head" in Mexican slang), appearing frequently on album covers and merchandise. The severed head belonged to a drug dealer in a photo taken from a Mexican publication. This album featured Shane Embury on guitar and bass.

=== Raza Odiada, Marijuana and Spanglish 101 (1995–1999) ===
In 1995, they released their second full-length, Raza Odiada, with the usual themes but with changes in their music. For many critics and fans, it was their best work to date. Raza Odiada featured the single "La Ley De Plomo", whose music video was successful on music channels such as MTV, featuring late at night on heavy metal shows.

The group became increasingly popular but decided to remain anonymous and declined offers to organize concerts (except on rare occasions), confusing fans who wanted to see them live. Two years later came the EP Marijuana, featuring a cover-parody of "The Macarena" and four live songs from its first official concert.

1999 saw the release of Spanglish 101, a compilation of label Kool Arrow Records' artists, protesting against the dominance of English. On this album, the band released a couple of new tracks: "Marcha de Odio" which would later be included in their next album, Brujerizmo and "Don Quijote Marijuana", cover of Magazine 60's hit song Don Quixote, an issue that attracted attention for its techno-dance style, completely different from the band's heavy metal sound.

=== Commercial success with Brujerizmo and Mextremist Hits! (2000–2001) ===
In 2000, five years after the last LP, Brujerizmo was released, which incorporated Nick Barker as a second drummer, Jesse Pintado on the guitar and Gaby Dominguez, as "Pititis", who represents a female demon as the female vocalist.

The next release was a compilation, called Mextremist! Greatest Hits, released in 2001, which included classic tracks, alternate versions, remixes, a multimedia track with video, and some new themes, such as the collaboration with Mucho Muchacho on "Narco-Peda" and "Asesino" which featured Tony Campos of Static-X. The record, rather than being a compilation, was more like a disc of rarities and B-sides, since most of the songs were not the album versions, but the versions on the EPs and singles. The disc also included a video cover for the Magazine 60 song "Don Quichotte" named "Don Quijote Marihuana".

=== Hiatus and projects (2002–2006) ===
2002 came with many plans for the band, first they went to record new material for their eagerly awaited fourth album. However, this seems to have been put on hold due to altercations between Cazares and Herrera related to the temporary breakup of Fear Factory. Herrera departed Brujeria in 2002, shortly before Fear Factory reformed without Cazares. The band then announced the launch of various side-projects for each of the band members, starting with Asesino who launched that same year, Corridos de Muerte with the band featuring Tony Campos and Emilio Marquez.

There is a DVD compilation of the band called "Permission of Satan". This DVD was produced by Juan Brujo and Henry about the recording period of the Asesino album and videos of his first three presentations of the official tour of Brujeria, The Mexecutioner Tour. Also includes images of the addition of Wee Man Jason Acuña of Jackass, Satanico Army Band, Mariachi Terror, and others. The DVD was homemade and distributed by Juan Brujo.

Brujeria declined to do live performances in its early years, however, on June 11, 1997, they played at the Whisky a Go Go club in Hollywood. The short concert itself was incorporated into the EP "Marijuana" as a side B. On October 2, 2003, the band played its first official concert in Chicago, USA, and began its first tour known as The Mexecutioner Tour, which concluded on January 24, 2004 in Guadalajara, Mexico. Also in 2003, Roadrunner Records released a compilation of tracks from the studio albums, the band titled The Mexecutioner! - The Best of Brujeria. The band, now with Nick Barker on drums, decided to promote the work as the band had never done before, which included interviews, concerts and more. Starting with a second tour called "Tour II", which began on February 7, 2004, in Mexicali and the first appearance of Pititis the female voice of the band, their first visit to Brazil and Argentina, concluding the tour on August 8, 2004 in Buenos Aires.

After that, the band was absent from the stage and uncertainty about the group's future arose, it was speculated that the reason for this was that they were working on a new album but none materialized. Also during this period of time, several vital members of the group such as Dino Cazares, departed after alleged differences with frontman Juan Brujo. In an interview conducted to Fantasma in 2011, he revealed that Cazares departure was owed to his decision to participate in the Roadrunner United project in 2005, forcing the rest of the band to cancel their show at the annual Rock Al Parque Festival in Colombia, damaging the band's reputation. In 2006, there was news from the band with the release of The Singles which is a revival of the EP and singles of the band and the beginning of a new global concert tour known as "No Seas Pendejo Tour" that began in Buenos Aires, Argentina on January 28 and also included the presentation in Vive Latino 2006 in Mexico featuring two new members: Tony Laureano on drums and Jeff Walker on bass. Shane Embury left bass and switched to guitar. At their first appearance in Europe Viña Rock, Spain, the tour concluded on 6 August of that year in Houston, Texas. Later, in September of that year, they returned to do a small tour in Spain known as "Don Quijote Marijuana Tour" now with Patrik Jensen on guitar and Adrian Erlandsson on drums.

=== Reunion, Pocho Aztlan, Esto Es Brujeria and deaths (2007–present) ===
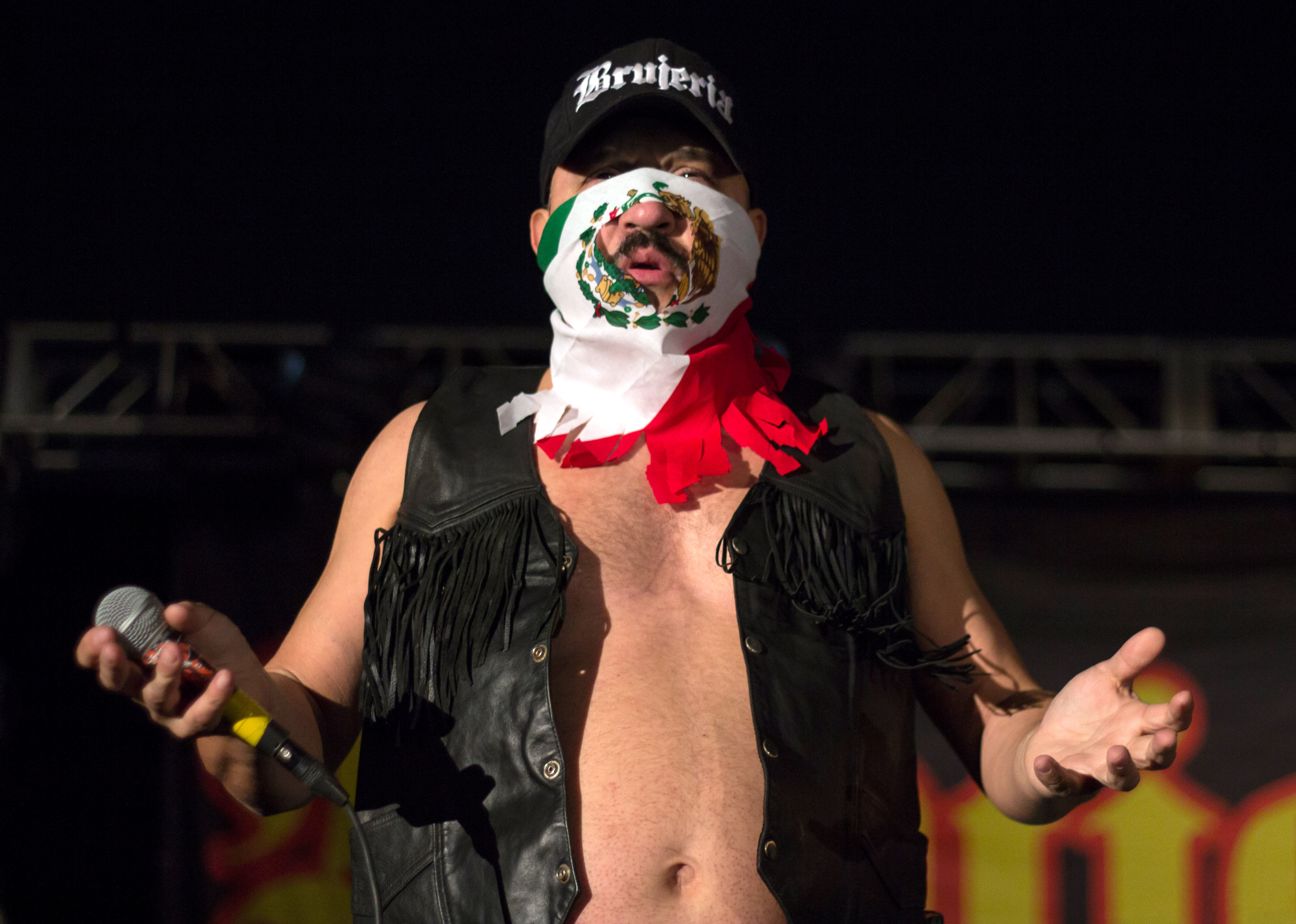
Juan Brujo at Mexico City in 2017

After several years on hiatus, and internal problems, Brujeria reformed in 2007 and decided it was time to return to the scene. Juan Brujo (vocals), Pat Hoed (second vocals), Jeff Walker (bass), Shane Embury (guitar) and Adrian Erlandsson (drums) started a new tour called "Weapon of Change Tour". Lasting from February 21 to December 15, the band performed in England, Italy, Spain, France, Germany, the United States, Mexico, Colombia, Argentina, Brazil, Peru, Chile, and Ecuador. Between April and June 2008, Brujeria returned to Europe to play some concerts as an extension of the "Weapon of Change Tour", including dates at SWR MetalFest XI in Barroselas (Portugal), again Viña Rock (Albacete, Spain) and in Kobetasonik, a rock festival that takes place in the Basque Country (Spain). In November and December of that year, the band began another tour called "Accept No Imitations Tour". Brujeria played at the 10th annual Maryland Death Fest in May 2012.

They performed a world tour between 2007 and 2008. In an interview in June 2009, bassist Shane Embury stated that the band's fourth studio album was going to be released that year, and that it could be released by the band itself. In October 2014, they signed with indie giant Nuclear Blast for an album in 2015. On July 1, 2016, the band announced that they would finally release their fourth studio album Pocho Aztlan on September 16. The album is their first in sixteen years, and their first to feature Hongo Jr., El Cynico, El Sangron and Cuernito.

Since the release of Pocho Aztlan, Brujeria has continued to tour regularly and released a series of one-off singles, including two anti-Trump songs "Viva Presidente Trump!" and "Amaricon Czar" (in 2016 and 2019 respectively), and "Covid-666" in 2020. The band had been working on new material by February 2022. On July 14, 2023, the band released their first single from their new album Esto Es Brujeria called "Mochado". The album was released on September 15.

Pinche Peach died of heart failure on July 17, 2024, at the age of 57. On September 18, 2024, it was announced in a post from the band's Instagram account that Juan Brujo died that morning, at the age of 61, due to a heart attack he had experienced on September 16, 2024, while taking a day off from their tour with Gwar. The band has since continued without Lepe.

== Band members ==
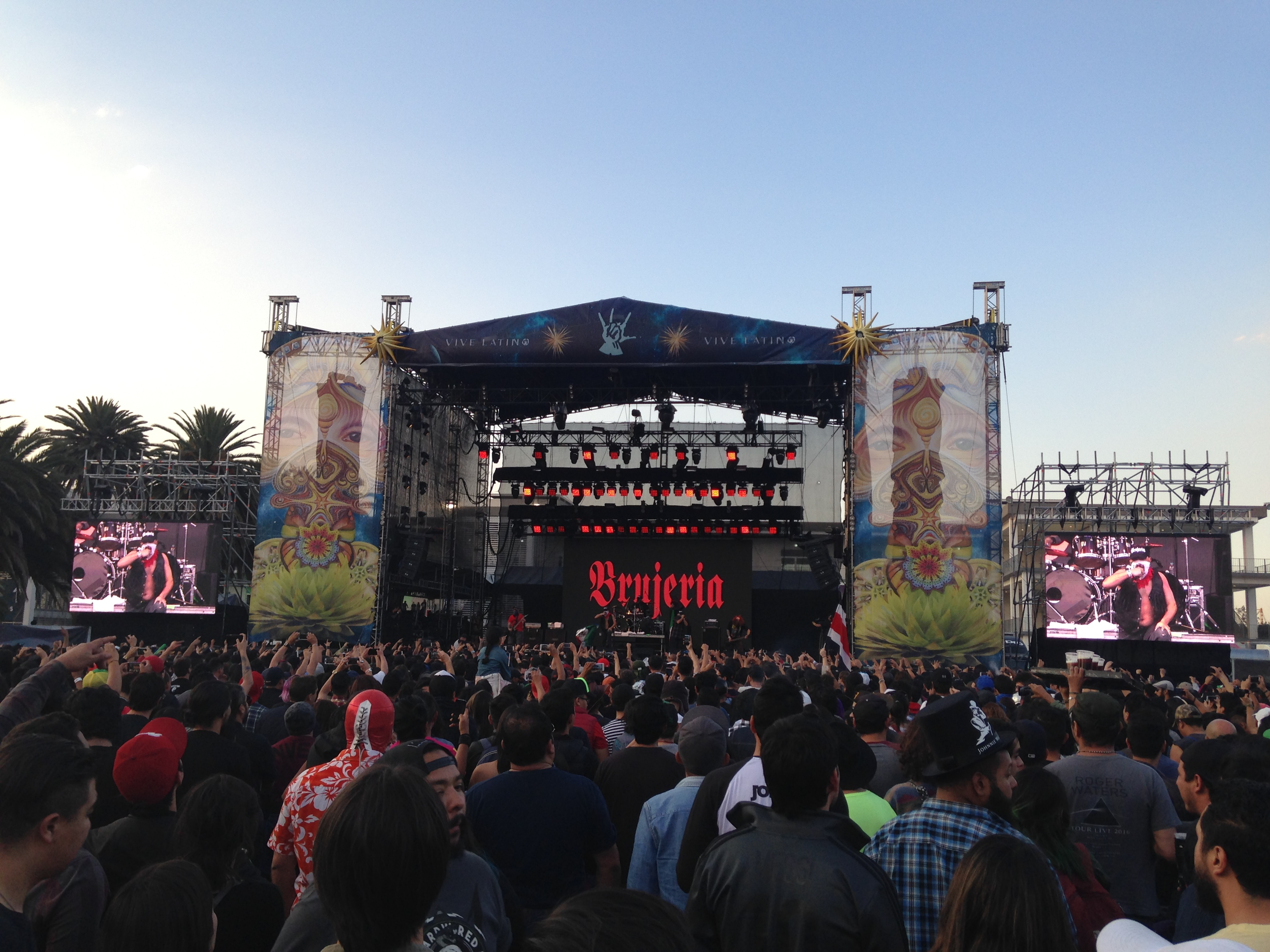
Brujeria at Doritos Stage, Vive Latino festival, Mexico City, Mexico

=== Current ===
- Fantasma (Pat Hoed) – bass, backing vocals (1993–present, not touring since 2014), drums (1989–1993)
- Hongo (Shane Embury) – guitars, bass, drums (1989–present, not touring since 2022)
- El Sangrón (Henry Sanchez) – lead vocals (2014–present)
- El Criminal (Anton Reisenegger) – guitars, backing vocals (2015–present)
- La Bruja Encabronada (Jessica Pimentel) – vocals (female) (2017–present)
- Zangano (Sergio Lopez) – bass (2022–present)
- El Sativo (John Christopher Lepe) – drums (2022–present)

=== Former ===
- Juan Brujo (John David Lepe) – lead vocals (1989–2024; his death)
- Asesino (Dino Cazares) – guitars (1989–2005)
- Güero Sin Fe (Billy Gould) – bass, guitars (1989–2002)
- Hozicón Jr. (Jello Biafra) – additional vocals (1989–1992, 1995–1996)
- Pinche Peach (Ciriaco Quezada) – samples, vocals (1992–2024; his death)
- Greñudo (Raymond Herrera) – drums (1993–2002)
- El Embrujado (Patrik Jensen) – guitars (1999–2004)
- Cristo de Pisto (Jesse Pintado) – guitars (2000; died 2006)
- Maldito X (Tony Campos) – vocals (2001)
- Hongo Jr. (Nick Barker) – drums (2002–2005, 2016–2022)
- Pititis (Gaby Dominguez) – vocals (female), guitars (2004–2016)
- El Sadistico (Emilio Márquez) – drums (2005)
- El Cynico (Jeff Walker) – bass, guitars, vocals (2006–2016)
- El Angelito (Tony Laureano) – drums (2006)
- El Podrido (Adrian Erlandsson) – drums (2006–2014)
- El Clavador (Daniel Erlandsson) – drums (2012–2014)

== Discography ==
=== Full-length albums ===
| Year | Title | Label | Format | Other information |
|---|---|---|---|---|
| 1993 | Matando Güeros | Roadrunner | CD | Debut album.; The album was banned in many places for its cover and content; the front cover depicts a person out of shot holding up a severed head. |
| 1995 | Raza Odiada | Roadrunner | CD | |
| 2000 | Brujerizmo | Roadrunner | CD | This is the last album recorded with the two original members, Asesino and Güero Sin Fe. |
| 2016 | Pocho Aztlan | Nuclear Blast | CD | This is the first album released on Nuclear Blast. This is also the band's first album in sixteen years, as well as its first release featuring El Cynico on bass. The album was released on September 16, 2016. |
| 2023 | Esto Es Brujeria | Nuclear Blast | CD | Final album with founding singer Juan Brujo, who died in 2024. |

=== Singles and EPs ===
- 1990 - ¡Demoniaco! (Nemesis Records)
- 1992 - ¡Machetazos! (Alternative Tentacles)
- 1994 - El Patrón (Alternative Tentacles)
- 2000 - Marijuana (Kool Arrow Records)
- 2008 - Debilador (Independent)
- 2009 - No Aceptan Imitaciones (Independent)
- 2010 - California Uber Aztlan (Independent)
- 2014 - Angel Chilango (Independent)
- 2016 - Viva Presidente Trump! (Nuclear Blast)
- 2019 - Amaricon Czar (Nuclear Blast)
- 2020 - COVID-666 (Nuclear Blast
- 2023 - Mochado (Nuclear Blast)

=== Compilation albums ===
- 1994 - Best of Grindcore and Destruction (Priority Records)
- 1996 - At Deaths Door II
- 1999 - Spanglish 101 (Kool Arrow Records)
- 2001 - Mextremist! Greatest Hits (Kool Arrow Records)
- 2003 - The Mexecutioner! - The Best of Brujeria (Roadrunner Records)
- 2006 - The Singles
