= Aggression Continuum =

Studio album by Fear Factory
- Released: June 18, 2021
- Recorded: 2017 (Burton C. Bell's vocals); 2020–2021 (drums and mixing)
- Genres: Industrial metal, groove metal
- Length: 48:34
- Label: Nuclear Blast
- Producer: Damien Rainaud

Fear Factory chronology
Genexus (2015)	Aggression Continuum (2021)	Recoded (2022)

Fear Factory studio album chronology
Genexus (2015)	Aggression Continuum (2021)	Roboticist (2027)

Singles from Aggression Continuum
- 1. "Disruptor" Released: April 16, 2021; 2. "Fuel Injected Suicide Machine" Released: May 14, 2021; 3. "Recode" Released: June 18, 2021; 4. "Monolith" Released: September, 2021

Aggression Continuum is the tenth studio album by American industrial metal band Fear Factory, released on June 18, 2021. It is their last album to feature frontman Burton C. Bell, who had left the band nine months before its release, and drummer Mike Heller. An instrumental version titled Aggression Continuum: The Instrumentals was released on September 17, 2021. A remixed version titled Recoded was released on October 28, 2022, featuring a compilation of remixes of the songs from the album.

== Album information ==
In November 2018, Burton C. Bell announced that the band completed a new album which was set to be released in 2019, with the title being called Monolith and the cover art revealed via his smartphone. He noted that there were "technical difficulties", but expressed a positive outcome. However, Dino Cazares refuted any information regarding it, and that there was no new album. In 2020, he stated that the band would release new music in 2021. Monolith would be changed to Aggression Continuum with a new cover art.

Aggression Continuum was Fear Factory's first studio album since Genexus (2015), marking the longest gap between two albums in their career. The reasons behind the six-year gap between Genexus and Aggression Continuum were due to creative and personal differences, and legal issues surrounding the band, all of which contributed to Fear Factory going on an extended hiatus and Burton C. Bell leaving the band in 2020 after more than three decades as their vocalist. Despite this, Bell's vocals are present on the album, as they were recorded in 2017.

Aggression Continuum saw Fear Factory's lineup intact (on the record at least) for the first time since Transgression, with Mike Heller on drums and Dino Cazares contributing to both guitar and bass.

The album also features Russian keyboardist Igor Khoroshev who is also in charge of the arrangements. Khoroshev is best known for being a member of English progressive rock band Yes from 1997 to 2000.

== Reception ==
Professional ratings
Review scores
Source	Rating
Blabbermouth	8/10
Exclaim!	8/10
Kerrang!	4/5 stars
Metal Hammer	3.5/5 stars
Metal Injection	8/10
New Noise Magazine	4.5/5 stars
Sputnikmusic	3.4/5

The album received positive reviews. It was elected by Loudwire as the 33rd best rock/metal album of 2021. The single "Disruptor" was elected by the same publication as the 12th best metal song of the same year. Despite charting in various countries, Aggression Continuum ultimately became Fear Factory's first album to not appear on any Billboard chart in the US since their debut album from 1992, Soul of a New Machine.

== Track listing ==
All lyrics are written by Burton C. Bell; all music is composed by Dino Cazares.

No.	Title	Length
1.	"Recode"	5:47
2.	"Disruptor"	3:45
3.	"Aggression Continuum"	4:54
4.	"Purity"	3:50
5.	"Fuel Injected Suicide Machine"	5:28
6.	"Collapse"	4:20
7.	"Manufactured Hope"	5:01
8.	"Cognitive Dissonance"	4:37
9.	"Monolith"	3:34
10.	"End of Line"	7:18
Total length:		48:34

== Personnel ==
- Burton C. Bell – vocals
- Dino Cazares – guitars, bass, arrangements
- Mike Heller – drums

With

- Igor Khoroshev – arrangements, keyboards
- Rhys Fulber – additional keyboards
- Giuseppe Bassi – additional keyboards
- Max Karon – additional keyboards, guitar solo (9)
- Jake Stern – intro narration (1)
- Alex Rise – keyboards outro (10)
- Andy Sneap – mixing and mastering

== Charts ==
Chart performance for Aggression Continuum
Chart (2021)	Peak position
Australian Albums (ARIA)	15
Austrian Albums (Ö3 Austria)	31
Belgian Albums (Ultratop Flanders)	76
Belgian Albums (Ultratop Wallonia)	53
Czech Albums (ČNS IFPI)	81
German Albums (Offizielle Top 100)	20
Scottish Albums (Official Charts)	18
Swiss Albums (Schweizer Hitparade)	15
UK Albums (Official Charts)	98
UK Independent Albums (Official Charts)	7
UK Rock & Metal Albums (Official Charts)	2
