= Christian Olde Wolbers =

Belgian musician

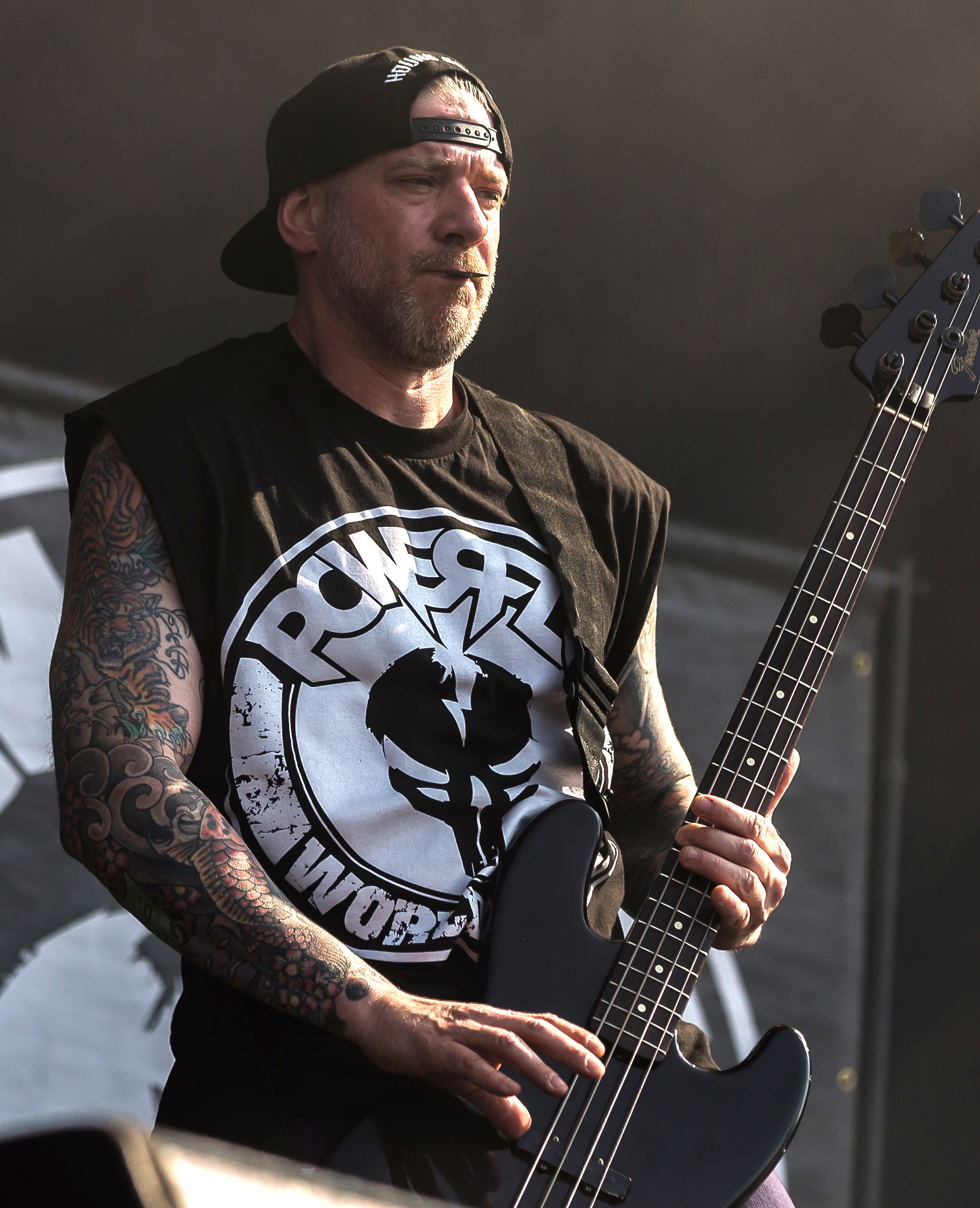
- Olde Wolbers with Powerflo at With Full Force 2018

Background information
- Born: 5 August 1972 (age 54); Antwerp, Belgium
- Genres: Heavy metal, nu metal, industrial metal, thrash metal
- Occupations: Musician, record producer, songwriter
- Instruments: Bass, guitar
- Years active: 1987–present
- Member of: Powerflo
- Formerly of: Fear Factory, Beowülf, Vio-lence, Kush

Christian Francis Olde Wolbers (born 5 August 1972) is a Belgian musician, record producer, and songwriter. He is the current bassist and backing vocalist of the rap metal/nu metal band Powerflo. He is also a former bassist of the thrash metal band Vio-lence and hardcore punk/crossover thrash band Beowülf, and a former bassist, guitarist and backing vocalist of the industrial metal band Fear Factory.

== Musical career ==
Olde Wolbers was born in Antwerp, Belgium, and moved to the United States in 1993. He was asked to join Fear Factory in December 1993 as a bass player. He recorded five albums with them. The group disbanded in 2002 and when it reformed in 2003, Olde Wolbers had switched to guitar, replacing Dino Cazares.

Olde Wolbers is the only bassist that played on a Fear Factory album, as the other bassists only played live (with Dino Cazares recording the bass in the studio).

In 2003, he was offered a position of bassist in Ozzy Osbourne's solo band after he jammed with Ozzy, guitarist Zakk Wylde and drummer Mike Bordin for a few weeks. He eventually turned down this offer in order to fully concentrate on Fear Factory.

In 2006, Olde Wolbers played three shows with Korn on their European tour.

In 2008, he formed a new band, Burn It All, which also feature Raymond Herrera (drums) and former Damageplan singer/Halford guitarist Patrick Lachman. They posted a demo sampler on its MySpace page.

In 2009, Olde Wolbers and drummer Raymond Herrera parted ways with Fear Factory when vocalist Burton C. Bell chose to reform Fear Factory with Dino Cazares, bassist Byron Stroud, and drummer Gene Hoglan.

Olde Wolbers has a project Arkaea with fellow ex-Fear Factory drummer Raymond Herrera and Jon Howard and Pat Kavanagh of the band Threat Signal. On 14 July 2009, Arkaea's debut album, Years in the Darkness was released. He also played with Beowülf and co-produced their 2011 album Jesus Freak.

In early 2014, Olde Wolbers was in a serious motorcycle accident in which he sustained severe injuries, including broken arms, legs and ribs. He conducted guitar and bass lessons on Skype to help cover his medical bills.

In July 2016, Olde Wolbers joined Threat Signal as their bass player on the Under Reprisal Anniversary tour.

In 2020, he joined Vio-lence as the replacement of original bassist Deen Dell, who had left the band for personal reasons. He departed the band in February 2025 to focus on his solo band and production career.

In October 2022, Olde Wolbers was announced as the new bass player of Bloodclot, a project formed by former Cro-Mags vocalist John Joseph.

In 2023, Olde Wolbers was the touring upright bassist for Cypress Hill's live performances with the London Symphony Orchestra.

=== Powerflo ===
In 2017, Olde Wolbers formed a new band called Powerflo with Senen Reyes, Roy Lozano, Billy Graziadei and Fernando Schaefer. The band released their self-titled debut album the same year. Olde Wolbers is the band's bassist and backing vocalist.

=== Angst Fabrik ===
In March 2025, Olde Wolbers announced that he was forming a new band named Angst Fabrik that is in the process of recording and publishing their debut studio album in 2026. The name Angst Fabrik literally translates from German to English as "Fear Factory".

=== Guest appearances and production work ===
Olde Wolbers contributed upright bass to Devin Townsend's second album Infinity in 1998. In 2006, he helped produce and mix Mnemic's third album, Passenger, and also produced Bleed the Sky's Murder the Dance and Threat Signal's debut album, Under Reprisal. In 2008, he produced End of the Rope's new album, Till It Bleeds and in 2009, Wolbers produced Years in the Darkness for Arkaea and the album Fallen Empires for Our Last Enemy. He filled in as live guitarist for Korn for the first three shows of their European tour. He appears as a guest guitar player on the EP This World by breakbeat production group The Autobots. He produced the vocals for God Forbid's Earthsblood, co-wrote and played bass on Snoop Dogg's album Paid tha Cost to Be da Boss. He helped Cypress Hill with their rock outfit and wrote songs for their Stoned Raiders and Skull & Bones albums. He also played on two songs on Soulfly's debut in 1998. In 2017 he played bass for Isolated Antagonist for their album Oblivion.

== Sport ==
As a teenager, Olde Wolbers was a goalkeeper in the youth academy of Belgian professional football club Germinal Ekeren, and was the team's reserve goalkeeper for several games in the Belgian Second Division. At 17, he was suspended for having long hair and tattoos, and chose to concentrate on his music career. Olde Wolbers also played wide receiver and defensive back for the Antwerp Diamonds of the Belgian Football League. Since moving to the United States, he has played regularly for the Los Angeles-based amateur team Hollywood United, and currently plays for Angel City FC in the semi-professional Los Angeles Premier League. He is also the founder and owner of Aviata Sports, a manufacturer of goalkeeper gloves.

== Discography ==
=== With Powerflo ===
Albums

- Powerflo (2017)
- Gorilla Warfare (2024)

Singles

- Resistance (2017)
- Victim of Circumstance (2017)

=== With Beowülf ===
- Jesus Freak (2011)

=== With Arkaea ===
- Years in the Darkness (2009)

=== With Fear Factory ===
- Demanufacture (1995)
- Obsolete (1998)
- Digimortal (2001)
- Archetype (2004)
- Transgression (2005)

=== With Vio-lence ===
- Let the World Burn (2022)

=== Guest appearances ===
- A.N.I.M.A.L. – Poder Latino (1998)
- Devin Townsend – Infinity (1998)
- Soulfly – Soulfly (1998)
- Cypress Hill – Skull & Bones (2000)
- Kurupt - Space Boogie: Smoke Oddessey (2000)
- Cypress Hill – Stoned Raiders (2001)
- Snoop Dogg - Paid tha Cost to Be da Boss (2002)
- Roadrunner United – The All-Star Sessions (2005)
- Threat Signal – Under Reprisal (2006)
- Isolated Antagonist – Oblivion (2017)
- S7IGMA – "Dogmatic Death" (2021)

=== Production credits ===
- Threat Signal – Under Reprisal (2006)
- Bleed the Sky – Murder the Dance (2007)
- Mnemic – Passenger (2007)
- End of the Rope – Till It Bleeds (2008)
- God Forbid – Earthsblood (2009)
- Our Last Enemy – Fallen Empires (2010)
- Sunflower Dead – (2011)
- Sylencer – A Lethal Dose of Truth (2012)
