= Asesino =

American deathgrind band

- Origin: Los Angeles, California, U.S.
- Genres: Deathgrind
- Years active: 2002–2003, 2006–2007, 2009–present
- Label: Odio
- Members: Asesino (Dino Cazares); Maldito X (Tony Campos); El Sadístico (Emilio Márquez)
- Past members: Greñudo (Raymond Herrera); Sepulculo (Andreas Kisser)

Asesino (Spanish for "assassin" or "murderer") is an American deathgrind supergroup and a side project of Fear Factory guitarist Dino Cazares. The band has featured members of Brujeria, Fear Factory, Sepultura, Sadistic Intent, Possessed, Ministry, and Static-X.

Asesino sometimes play Slayer covers live, notably "Angel of Death" and "Raining Blood". As with Brujeria, the lyrics are sung in Spanish and with the same subject matter of death, violence and perversion. Guitarist Asesino describes the band as "the new Brujeria." Asesino has a tendency to make satirical comments during the show, and changing the lyrics of Brujeria songs to something more fitting.

Asesino made a guest appearance as Mexican doctors in episode 57 of Metalocalypse on Adult Swim. Campos voiced Dr. Sepultura and Cazares and Márquez voiced his assistants.

== Members ==
- Asesino (Dino Cazares) – guitars (2002–present)
- Maldito X (Tony Campos) – bass, vocals (2002–present)
- Sadístico (Emilio Márquez) – drums (2002–present)

=== Former members ===
- Greñudo (Raymond Herrera) – drums (on Corridos de Muerte) (2002)
- Sepulculo (Andreas Kisser) – guitars (on Cristo Satanico) (2006)

== Discography ==
- Corridos de Muerte (2002)
- Cristo Satánico (2006)
