= Marijuana (EP) =

EP by Brujeria
- Released: June 3, 2000
- Recorded: January 11, 1997
- Genres: Death metal; Deathgrind; Groove metal
- Length: 18:03
- Label: Koolarrow Records
- Producer: Brujeria

Brujeria chronology
Spanglish 101 (1999)	Marijuana (2000)	Brujerizmo (2000)

Professional ratings
Review scores
Source	Rating
Allmusic	link

Marijuana EP is an EP released by Brujeria. The song "Marijuana" is a metalized parody of the pop hit "Macarena". Two vinyl versions exist - green and black. Early vinyl copies came with matches.

== Track listing ==
1. "Marijuana" – 3:11
2. "Matando Güeros '97"– 3:13
3. "Pito Wilson (live)" * – 3:12
4. "Hechando Chingazos (live)" * – 3:41
5. "Matando Güeros (live)" * – 4:09
6. "Hidden Track" – 0:35
- Live from the Whisky a Go Go. January 11, 1997.
