= Matando Güeros =

Studio album by Brujeria
- Released: July 6, 1993
- Genre: Grindcore
- Length: 33:00
- Label: Roadrunner Records
- Producer: Brujeria

Brujeria chronology
Matando Güeros (1993)	Raza Odiada (1995)

Professional ratings
Review scores
Source	Rating
AllMusic	2.5/5 stars

Matando Güeros (Killing Whites) is the debut album by the band Brujeria. "Güero" is a Mexican-Spanish slang term for a blonde or light skinned/haired person. The album talks mostly about controversial topics in Mexico like drug trafficking, satanic rituals, sexuality, migration, illegal border crossing, and Anti-Americanism (like the title song, that talks about a revenge killing-spree against the White Americans that mistreated the indigenous Mexican narrator).

== Album information ==
The front cover depicts a person out of frame holding up a severed head, which was taken from the Mexican Shocking and Sensationalistic/Yellow journalistic newspaper ¡Peligro!. The album was banned in many places due to its cover and content. This head, nicknamed "Coco Loco", has been taken by the band as a mascot and logo. Track 16 to 19 are taken from the Machetazos single. "Matando Güeros" was featured on the Gummo soundtrack.

== Critical reception ==
Heavy Metal: The Music And Its Culture placed the album on its "100 Definitive Metal Albums" list.

== Track listing ==
All songs written and arranged by Brujeria. (1993 Roadblock Music ASCAP/Machetazos Music ASCAP)

1. "Pura de Venta" – 0:42 ("Pure for Sale")
2. "Leyes Narcos" – 1:10 ("Narco Laws")
3. "Sacrificio" – 1:16 ("Sacrifice")
4. "Santa Lucía" – 0:43 ("Saint Lucia")
5. "Matando Güeros" – 2:25 ("Killing Whites")
6. "Seis Seis Seis" – 1:19 ("Six Six Six")
7. "Cruza la Frontera" – 1:44 ("Cross the Border")
8. "Greñudos Locos" – 1:28 ("Long-Haired Maniacs")
9. "Chingo de Mecos" – 1:16 ("Fuckload of Cum")
10. "Narcos Satánicos" – 1:50 ("Satanic Narcos")
11. "Desperado" – 2:42 ("Desperado")
12. "Culeros" – 0:52 ("Assholes")
13. "Misas Negras (Sacrificio III)" – 1:21 ("Black Masses [Sacrifice III]")
14. "Chinga Tu Madre" – 3:11 ("Go Fuck Yourself")
15. "Verga del Brujo / Están Chingados" – 3:43 ("Warlock's Cock / You Are Fucked")
16. "Molestando Niños Muertos" – 2:57 ("Molesting Dead Children")
17. "Machetazos (Sacrificio II)" – 1:27 ("Machete Attack [Sacrifice II]")
18. "Castigo del Brujo" – 1:44 ("Punishment of the Warlock")
19. "Cristo de la Roca" – 1:14 ("Christ of the Stone")

== Personnel ==
=== Brujeria ===
- Juan Brujo - vocals
- Asesino - guitars
- Hongo - guitars, additional bass
- Güero Sin Fe - bass, additional guitars
- Fantasma - additional bass, backing vocals
- Pinche Peach - samples, backing vocals
- Greñudo - drums

=== Additional personnel ===
- Hozicon Jr. - direction
