= Brujerizmo =

Studio album by Brujeria
- Released: May 17, 2000
- Recorded: 1999–2000
- Genre: Death metal; groove metal
- Length: 35:44
- Label: Roadrunner
- Producer: Güero Sin Fe, Asesino, Juan Brujo

Brujeria chronology
Marijuana (EP) (2000)	Brujerizmo (2000)	Mextremist! Greatest Hits (2001)

Brujerizmo is the third studio album by American metal band Brujeria. It features a more groove-oriented style, with a clear and refined sound as opposed to the deathgrind style of the previous albums. It also marked the last release composed of new material by the band released by Roadrunner Records. It is also the last release with founding members Asesino and Güero Sin Fe.

== Reception ==
Professional ratings
Review scores
Source	Rating
Allmusic	link
NME	link

CMJ (2/12/01, p. 37) - "Machete death metal...more venomous and hotter than a Habanero pepper....Juan Brujo's growling political rants strike out against hate, racism and xenophobia."

Melody Maker (11/28/00, p. 52) - 3.5 stars out of 5 - "Wonderfully demented thrash....this is south-of-the-border murderous noise, absolutely bereft of anything approaching accessibility....here's a record your parents will worry about you owning."

NME (12/9/00, p. 45) - 8 out of 10 - "They take a hyper-violent idea to its logical, bowel-churning and comically thrilling end."

== Track listing ==
All tracks by Brujeria

1. "Brujerizmo" – 3:50 ("Witchcraft")
2. "Vayan Sin Miedo" – 2:16 ("Go Without Fear")
3. "La Traición" – 1:57 ("The Betrayal")
4. "Pititis, Te Invoco" – 2:24 ("Pititis, I Summon You")
5. "Laboratorio Cristalitos" – 1:31 ("Laboratory Crystals")
6. "Division del Norte" – 3:51 ("Northern Division")
7. "Marcha de Odio" – 2:49 ("March of Hate")
8. "Anti-Castro" – 2:33 ("Anti-Castro")
9. "Cuiden a los Niños" – 3:30 ("Take Care of the Kids")
10. "El Bajón" – 1:59 ("The Fall", an expression to refer to when you stop being high, particularly if it is sudden)
11. "Mecosario" – 2:47 ("Cum-ossuary")
12. "El Desmadre" – 1:41 ("The Excess")
13. "Sida de la Mente" – 4:36 ("AIDS of the Mind")

== Personnel ==
- Juan Brujo – vocals
- Asesino – guitars, bass
- Fantasma – bass, vocals
- Güero Sin Fe – bass, vocals
- Greñudo – drums
- Hongo – bass, guitars
- Pinche Peach – vocals
- Pititis – female vocals
- Hongo Jr. – drums
- Cristo de Pisto – guitars
- Marijuano Machete – vocals
