= Threat Signal =

Canadian metal band

- Origin: Hamilton, Ontario, Canada
- Genres: Metalcore; melodic death metal; groove metal
- Years active: 2003−present
- Labels: Agonia, Nuclear Blast
- Members: Jon Howard; Travis Montgomery; Joey Muha; Oswin Wong; Pat Kavanagh
- Past members: Norman Killeen; Adam Weber; Kyle McKnight; George Parfitt; Rich Howard; Marco Bressette; Adam Matthews; Eric Papky; Alex Rüdinger; Chris Feener; Ryan Miller; Matt Perrin
- Website: threatsignal.weebly.com

Threat Signal is a Canadian heavy metal band from Hamilton, Ontario. The band has had numerous lineup change. Jon Howard is the only remaining original member. Their music is often classified as metalcore, melodic death metal, or groove metal.

== History ==
=== Early years (2003–2005) ===
Threat Signal was formed in the summer of 2003 by cousins Jon and Rich Howard. They recruited guitarist Kyle McKnight and began writing and recording. In the early months of 2004, the trio posted a demo for the song "Rational Eyes" to an international music chart on GarageBand.com. The song reached No. 1 and received GarageBand awards for best guitars, best drums, best male vocals, best production, song of the week, and song of the day. This success sparked record label interest and helped create a following before the band had performed live.

In the spring of 2004, drummer Adam Matthews and bassist Eric Papky joined. On December 10, 2004, Threat Signal headlined their first show at The Underground in Hamilton. For the better part of 2005, Threat Signal continued to write and record material for their debut album, Under Reprisal. In the summer of 2005, Papky left and Marco Bressette replaced him.

=== Under Reprisal (2005–2008) ===
In September 2005, the band traveled to Los Angeles to record their debut album, Under Reprisal, with producer Christian Olde Wolbers of Fear Factory. During recording, drummer Adam Matthews left the band. George Parfitt replaced him. In November, the band signed with Nuclear Blast.

Under Reprisal was released on May 6, 2006, to positive reviews. In July 2006, Threat Signal took part in Germany's Earthshaker Festival. A month later, guitarist Rich Howard left the band and was replaced with the band's bassist, Marco Bressette. Pat Kavanagh became the new bassist.

In October 2006, the band went on the six-week North American "Last Stab Tour" with Soilwork, Mnemic, and Darkest Hour. In November, Under Reprisal won Canadian Recording of the Year award at the Hamilton Music Awards.

In March 2007, Threat Signal began demoing new material, but was hampered by guitarist Marco Bressette's departure. Former member Rich Howard filled in until Adam Weber took over the position.

In the late spring of 2007, Threat Signal opened for the Tour and Loathing Canadian trek alongside Protest the Hero, All That Remains, Blessthefall, and The Holly Springs Disaster. In June 2007, the band played seven shows on the Canadian east coast with The End. In July 2007, the band announced that there would be no further touring that summer. This was because Kyle McKnight and George Parfitt had left the band. They were replaced with guitarist Travis Montgomery and drummer Norman Killeen. In 2008, Howard and Kavanagh joined ex-Fear Factory members Raymond Herrera and Christian Olde Wolbers in the side-project band Arkaea.

=== Vigilance (2009–2010) ===
Threat Signal's second album, Vigilance, produced by Jon Howard (the only founding member left in the band) and mixed by Greg Reely, was released on September 8, 2009, in North America and September 11, 2009, in Europe. Reviews were good. The band produced a music video for the track "Severed" and, on July 15, released a 32-minute "Making Of" video for the record, containing footage of the recordings, the songwriting process, and interviews with band members. The album sold around 1,100 copies in its first week in the United States. The band toured with Epica and Dark Tranquillity to support the album.

In July 2010, Adam Weber quit the band. Ex-Darkest Hour guitarist Kris Norris filled in. Two months later, drummer Norman Killeen left. Drummer Alex Rüdinger and guitarist Chris Feener replaced Weber and Killeen.

=== Threat Signal (2011–2016) ===
Threat Signal's self-titled album was released on October 7, 2011, in Europe and on October 11, 2011, in North America. It was produced by Chris "Zeuss" Harris (Chimaira, Hatebreed, The Acacia Strain etc.), and received positive reviews. To promote the album, the band toured the US and Eastern Canada in 2012 with Children of Bodom, Eluveitie, and Revocation.

In April 2012, Alex Rüdinger left the band. Chris Feener left shortly after. He was replaced with Matt Perrin. Rüdinger was replaced with former Our Lady of Bloodshed drummer Joey Muha, who left in June 2015 to join Jungle Rot. Andrew Minarik stepped in for Disconnect. Former drummer Norman Killeen passed away on August 25, 2016.

=== Disconnect (2017–2024) ===
The band toured and worked on its fourth album, Disconnect, released on November 10, 2017, by Agonia Records. Reviews were mixed. The band continued to tour North America in support of the album.

While Threat Signal continued to perform, in January 2019, Jon Howard joined metal band Imonolith. Former bassist Pat Kavanagh rejoined the band in late 2023.

=== Revelations (2025–present) ===
On July 10, 2025, Howard posted on the band's Instagram feed that the fifth album was recorded and mastered. The album Revelations was announced on January 29 for release on March 27.

== Band members ==
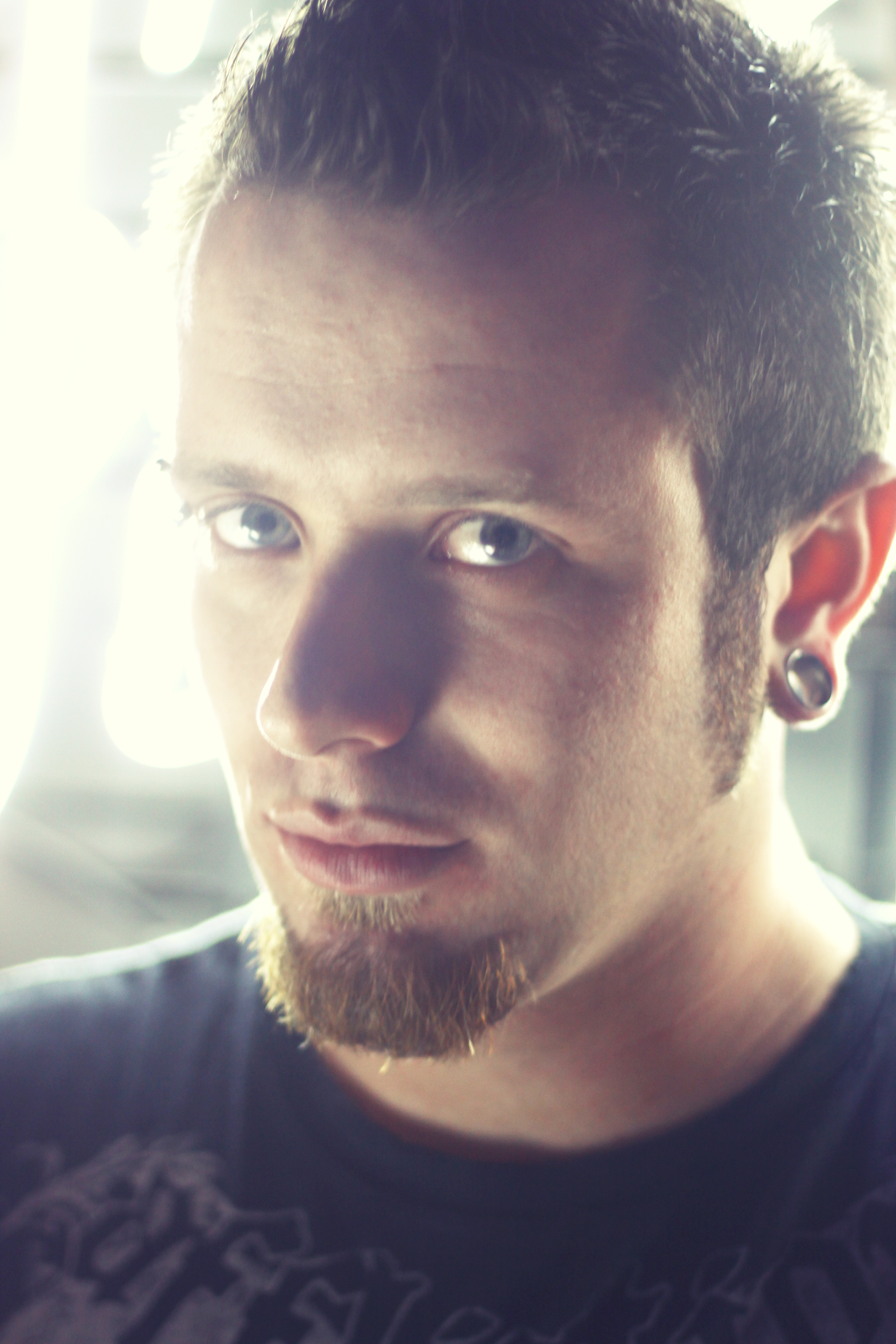
Lead singer Jon Howard

Current

- Jon Howard – vocals (2003–present), studio guitar (2025–present)
- Travis Montgomery – lead guitar (2007–present)
- Joey Muha – drums (2013–2015, 2018, 2020–present)
- Oswin Wong – rhythm guitar (2018, 2020–present)
- Pat Kavanagh – bass, backing vocals (2006–2018, 2023–present)

Former

- Kyle McKnight – lead guitar (2003–2007)
- Rich Howard – rhythm guitar, backing vocals (2003–2006)
- Adam Matthews – drums (2004–2005)
- Eric Papky – bass (2004–2005)
- Marco Bressette – bass (2005–2006), rhythm guitar (2006–2007)
- Ryan Miller – bass (2018–2023)
- George Parfitt – drums (2006–2007)
- Norman Killeen – drums (2007–2010; died 2016)
- Adam Weber – rhythm guitar (2007–2010)
- Alex Rüdinger – drums (2010–2012)
- Kris Norris – rhythm guitar (2010, 2013)
- Chris Feener – rhythm guitar (2010–2012)
- Matt Perrin – rhythm guitar (2013–2020)

Studio musicians

- Andrew Minarik – drums (2015–2016) for Disconnect

Touring musicians

- Christian Olde Wolbers – bass (2016)
- James Knoerl – drums (2016)

Timeline

== Discography ==
=== Studio albums ===
- Under Reprisal (Nuclear Blast, 2006)
- Vigilance (Nuclear Blast, 2009)
- Threat Signal (Nuclear Blast, 2011)
- Disconnect (Agonia, 2017)
- Revelations (Agonia, 2026)

=== Singles ===
- "Rational Eyes" (Nuclear Blast, 2006)
- "A New Beginning" (Nuclear Blast, 2008)
- "Through My Eyes" (Nuclear Blast, 2009)
- "Comatose" (Nuclear Blast, 2011)
- "Fallen Disciples" (Nuclear Blast, 2011)
- "Face the Day" (Nuclear Blast, 2011)
- "Uncensored" (Nuclear Blast, 2012)
- "Exit the Matrix" (Agonia, 2017)
- "Elimination Process" (Agonia, 2017)
- "Non - Essential" (Agonia, 2026)
- "Exercise The Demon" (Agonia, 2026)
- "The Great Tribulation" (Agonia, 2026)
