= Arkaea =

Canadian metal band

- Genres: Metalcore, groove metal, industrial metal
- Years active: 2008−2012
- Labels: E1, Century Media
- Members: Raymond Herrera; Christian Olde Wolbers; Jon Howard; Pat Kavanagh

Arkaea was a metal band formed in 2008 featuring members from Fear Factory and Threat Signal.

== History ==
The band was formed by drummer Raymond Herrera and guitarist Christian Olde Wolbers, who had just left Fear Factory. They recorded a demo, sent it to Threat Signal vocalist Jon Howard and Arkaea was spawned. They tried to persuade Sam Rivers for bass, but he declined due to location. Ryan Martinie of Mudvayne offered his services but could not tour due to Mudvayne commitments. Finally, another Threat Signal member, Pat Kavanagh, joined on bass.

Their debut album was 13 tracks, most of which were originally intended for a new Fear Factory album. Years in the Darkness was released on July 14, 2009. A five-minute sampler was released, the band posted the opening track "Locust" on their Myspace page and a video was released for "Gone Tomorrow". It sold 980 copies in its first week, but was not particularly well received by critics.

Beginning in January 2009, Arkaea toured heavily through the US and into Europe, continuing to tour through November 2010. In July 2009, they played Germany's heavy metal festival Wacken Open Air.

Despite releasing a short pre-production demo in 2012 and promising a new album later that year, the band has not been publicly active since. In 2011, Olde Wolbers moved on to the band Beowülf; Herrera on to entrepreneurial ventures. In December 2019, Wolbers noted in an Instagram post that he had started working on a new Arkaea album, but also noted that Herrera would be "too busy" to contribute.

== Discography ==
Title	Release date	Label
Years in the Darkness	July 14, 2009; July 20, 2009	E1 Music (North America); Century Media Records (Europe)
