= The Industrialist =

Studio album by Fear Factory
- Released: June 5, 2012
- Genres: Industrial metal; groove metal
- Length: 48:45
- Labels: Candlelight, AFM, Bodog
- Producers: Rhys Fulber, Fear Factory

Fear Factory chronology
Mechanize (2010)	The Industrialist (2012)	Genexus (2015)

Singles from The Industrialist
- 1. "Recharger" Released: April 24, 2012; 2. "New Messiah" Released: May 30, 2012; 3. "The Industrialist" Released: August 28, 2012

The Industrialist is the eighth studio album by American industrial metal band Fear Factory, released on June 5, 2012.

A remixed and remastered version of the album, titled Re-Industrialized, was released on June 23, 2023, featuring live drums recorded with Mike Heller, who appears on the band's subsequent albums.

== Overview ==
The Industrialist marks the band's return to the concept album. Burton C. Bell said about the album, "the protagonist (The Industrialist) is the incarnation of all industries in the form of an automaton. The mechanical, technological, and scientific advances through the industrial age led to the creation of The Industrialist. In the story, the automaton becomes sentient as it collects memories with each passing day. Through observation and learning, it gains the will to exist. What was meant to help man, will eventually be man's demise." According to Cazares, the title was taken from a documentary the band saw about the people who developed "the engines for war machines", and God Eater was a name Bell saw on a toybox while traveling.

The album was recorded with Bell and Cazares as the only two credited members of the band, while Rhys Fulber once again produced and received additional writing credits. No live drummer was used on the album, with the band instead opting for programmed drums with help from John Sankey of Devolved, who was also credited. The band's drummer at the time, Gene Hoglan, wasn't informed of this decision and left the band after learning about the album's completion without him online.

=== Editions ===
There are four different editions available: a regular jewel case with 10 tracks, a digi-book available in North America containing two bonus tracks and the album's concept as written by Burton C. Bell included in the booklet. There are two editions exclusive in Europe; the first being a regular digipak with two bonus tracks, and the second being a limited fan box containing a stand-alone mask containing the digipak and a certificate, limited to 1,000 copies worldwide. The story is omitted from the European releases. However, once all 'special editions' are out of print, the band intends to make the conceptual story book on the North American 'special edition' release available in PDF format on the band's website. The Japanese edition comes with an acoustic version of "Timelessness" from Obsolete, dubbed "Timelessness II".

=== Re-Industrialized ===
On June 23, 2023, nearly 11 years after the release of The Industrialist, the album was re-released as Re-Industrialized with live drums done by then-drummer Mike Heller, a new mix done by Greg Reely, new guitar passages by Dino Cazares, and featuring five bonus tracks, including three covers: "Landfill" by Pitchshifter, "Saturation" by Sonic Violence, and "Passing Complexion" by Big Black.

== Reception ==
Professional ratings
Aggregate scores
Source	Rating
Metacritic	63/100
Review scores
Source	Rating
AllMusic	3/5 stars
ThisIsNotAScene	6/10
Sputnikmusic	3.5/5 stars
Angry Metal Guy	2.5/5 stars
Truemetal (IT)	92%
Rock and Metal in My Blood	7.5/10
Metal Underground	4/5 stars
Brutal Resonance	8/10
Lamb Goat	5/10
Ultimate Guitar	8.5/10
Metalitalia (IT)	6/10
Metal Fan (NL)	80%
Reflections of Darkness	7/10
Team Rock	3.5/5 stars

The album has received generally positive reviews from music critics and band fans. Gregory Heaney of AllMusic gave the album a mixed response with a rating of 3 out of 5. Heaney felt that The Industrialist brought absolutely nothing new, stating "anyone hoping for more of the same old Fear Factory will find a lot to love about The Industrialist, those who have been hoping for something different might find that the album isn't quite what they were looking for."

== Track listing ==
All lyrics are written by Burton C. Bell; all music is composed by Cazares/Fulber.

No.	Title	Writer(s)	Length
1.	"The Industrialist"	Dino Cazares, Burton C. Bell	6:07
2.	"Recharger"	Cazares, Bell, Rhys Fulber	4:09
3.	"New Messiah"	Cazares, Bell, Fulber	4:30
4.	"God Eater"	Cazares, Bell, Fulber	5:57
5.	"Depraved Mind Murder"	Cazares, Bell, Fulber	4:43
6.	"Virus of Faith"	Cazares, Bell, Fulber	4:34
7.	"Difference Engine"	Cazares, Bell, Fulber	3:37
8.	"Disassemble"	Cazares, Bell	4:12
9.	"Religion Is Flawed Because Man Is Flawed"	Cazares, Bell	1:52
10.	"Human Augmentation"	Cazares, Bell, Fulber	9:04
Total length:			48:45

Deluxe edition
No.	Title	Writer(s)	Length
11.	"Blush Response (Difference Engine Remix)"		4:38
12.	"Landfill" (Pitchshifter cover)	Mark Clayden, Jonathan Alan Carter	3:44
Total length:			57:07

Japanese edition
No.	Title	Length
11.	"Blush Response (Difference Engine Remix)"	4:38
12.	"Timelessness II"	3:10

Re-Industrialized
No.	Title	Writer(s)	Length
1.	"The Industrialist"	Dino Cazares, Burton C. Bell	6:07
2.	"Recharger"	Cazares, Bell, Rhys Fulber	4:09
3.	"New Messiah"	Cazares, Bell, Fulber	4:30
4.	"God Eater"	Cazares, Bell, Fulber	5:57
5.	"Depraved Mind Murder"	Cazares, Bell, Fulber	4:43
6.	"Virus of Faith"	Cazares, Bell, Fulber	4:34
7.	"Difference Engine"	Cazares, Bell, Fulber	3:37
8.	"Disassemble"	Cazares, Bell	4:12
9.	"Religion Is Flawed Because Man Is Flawed"	Cazares, Bell	1:52
10.	"Enhanced Reality"	Cazares, Bell, Fulber	5:36
11.	"Human Augmentation"	Cazares, Bell, Fulber	9:04
12.	"Fade Away (Recharger Remix)"	Bell, Cazares, Fulber	6:29
13.	"Noise in the Machine (Difference Engine Remix)"	Bell, Cazares, Fulber	4:39
14.	"Landfill" (Pitchshifter cover)	Mark Clayden, Jonathan Alan Carter	3:47
15.	"Saturation" (Sonic Violence cover)	David J. Godbold	4:17
16.	"Passing Complexion" (Big Black cover)	Steve Albini, Santiago Durango, Dave Riley	3:08
Total length:			1hr 17mins

== Personnel ==
Fear Factory

- Burton C. Bell – vocals, co-production, composing, lyric writing, vocal arrangement, arrangement
- Dino Cazares – guitars, bass, drum programming, drum writing, drum arrangement, co-production, composing, arrangement

Additional personnel

- Rhys Fulber – production, enhanced soundscape programming, keyboard arrangement, additional vocal arrangement, vocal editing, arrangement (2–7 & 10)
- Mike Heller – live drums (2023 Re-Industrialized version)
- Logan Mader – additional tracking, digital editing, additional vocal arrangement, vocal editing, guitar recording, bass recording, additional vocal recording
- Greg Reely – mixing, mastering
- Joey Blush – additional keyboard programming, production on "Blush Response (Difference Engine Remix)"
- Damian "The Frog" Rainaud – additional keyboard programming, assistant engineering, drum editing
- Alan "Ace" Bergman – guitar tech
- Brian Harrah – additional guitars
- John Sankey – drum programming, drum writing, drum arrangement
- Anthony Clarkson – artwork

== Charts ==
Chart performance
Chart (2012)	Peak position
Austrian Albums (Ö3 Austria)	56
Belgian Albums (Ultratop Wallonia)	121
Canadian Albums (Nielsen SoundScan)	43
Finnish Albums (Suomen virallinen lista)	23
German Albums (Offizielle Top 100)	27
Hungarian Albums (MAHASZ)	20
Swiss Albums (Schweizer Hitparade)	44
UK Albums (Official Charts)	106
UK Independent Albums (Official Charts)	17
UK Rock & Metal Albums (Official Charts)	4
US Billboard 200	38
US Independent Albums (Billboard)	8
US Top Hard Rock Albums (Billboard)	2
US Top Rock Albums (Billboard)	18
US Top Tastemaker Albums (Billboard)	21
