= Digimortal (album) =

Studio album by Fear Factory
- Released: April 24, 2001
- Recorded: September 30 − November 4, 2000
- Studio: Ocean Studios (Burbank, California) Armoury Studios (Vancouver, Canada)
- Genres: Nu metal; industrial metal; groove metal
- Length: 43:23
- Label: Roadrunner
- Producers: Fear Factory; Rhys Fulber

Fear Factory chronology
Messiah (1999)	Digimortal (2001)	Concrete (2002)

Fear Factory studio album chronology
Obsolete (1998)	Digimortal (2001)	Archetype (2004)

Singles from Digimortal
- 1. "Linchpin" Released: 2001; 2. "Invisible Wounds (Dark Bodies)" Released: 2001

Digimortal is the fourth studio album by American industrial metal band Fear Factory, released on April 24, 2001, by Roadrunner Records. It is a concept album and the final part of a trilogy that started with Demanufacture and continued with Obsolete. It was the band's last album before officially breaking up in March 2002, though they reformed in 2003.

== Background and recording ==
In February 2000, Fear Factory reported working on their follow-up to Obsolete. No lyrics had been written and the band had decided to shift away from their typical approach to creating a record. They also wanted a less-produced sound and stated that the new album would not be concept-based as their previous two were. The latter would ultimately not hold true. Already, Alternative Press was describing it as one of the most anticipated albums of the year.

Digimortal was produced by longtime Fear Factory collaborator Rhys Fulber. The group had considered working with Bob Rock who declined. Toby Wright was also approached but was allegedly busy with a new Ozzy Osbourne record.

Burton C. Bell noted in an interview with Billboard that, when beginning the writing process, the band wished to evolve their sound. As such, they constantly reminded themselves of the word "simplification" in the pursuit of Fear Factory's progression. He added, "We don't need to play a song seven minutes long if we can get the idea across in four minutes." Digimortal would use a more melodic approach both musically and vocally than previous records while maintaining Fear Factory's heaviness. Bell described it as "definitely as intense as Demanufacture but with the groove of Obsolete, and there's a lot more melody."

The track "Linchpin" was originally titled "Lynchpin" and an unused early track listing is featured on The Best of Fear Factory. In a move uncharacteristic for the band, B-Real, of the hip hop group Cypress Hill, is featured as a guest vocalist on "Back the Fuck Up", contributing elements of hardcore hip hop; Cazares and Olde Wolbers had guested on Cypress Hill's 2000 album Skull & Bones. It is the only song on the album that is not written by the band.

== Concept ==
While the band had initially decided to detour from their concept-based records, Digimortal would continue where Obsolete left off. Conceptually, the record contains a futuristic story about man and machine merging into one. The surviving humans and the machines realize they have to depend on each other if they are going to continue on. The title of the album is actually short for "Digital Mortality".

== Touring and promotion ==
A limited edition digipak version of the album was released simultaneously with the standard version, with four extra tracks. Fear Factory performed on the 2001 SnoCore Tour early that year. Frontman Burton C. Bell noted the album concept as "circuitry is creating a new image of man" and related this as "perfect for the first tour of the millennium". The band was also scheduled to support Papa Roach on their Raid The Nation Tour in spring but the headliners had to cancel due to an injury. Fear Factory instead performed smaller venues close to the originally planned tour's schedule.

In the fall of 2001, the band co-headlined with Machine Head alongside ill Niño and Chimaira on the Roadrunner Road Rage Tour. Fear Factory departed for two shows to perform on the Cypress Hill Smoke Out tour featuring the likes of Deftones, Busta Rhymes, and Method Man. The October 6 date would have an extended lineup featuring all the bands from the Roadrunner Rage Tour.

Digimortal featured the single "Linchpin" which gained substantial radio play and had a music video. A portion of "Invisible Wounds (Dark Bodies)", was featured during the credits of Resident Evil, as well as a mix on its soundtrack.

== Reception ==
Professional ratings
Review scores
Source	Rating
AllMusic	4/5 stars
Blabbermouth.net	8/10
Blender	3/5 stars
Chronicles of Chaos	6/10
Drowned in Sound	9/10
Q	3/5 stars
Rolling Stone	(favorable)

Digimortal was a commercial disappointment compared to the band's previous record. While its single "Linchpin" managed to chart, the album had only sold a reported 152,000 copies by March 2002. Digimortal received generally positive reviews. College Music Journal (4/9/01, p. 17) called the album "Demented disco" and that "Digimortal is cybercore: digitized, overdubbed metal with crunchy, machine-like production." Q magazine (5/01, p. 108) gave the album 3 stars out of 5 and called it "ethereal and breathtaking". Fan reaction was mixed, with some alienation stemming from the album's melodic simplicity and more radio friendly sound when compared to the band's other albums.

== Track listing ==
All tracks are written by Fear Factory, except "Back the Fuck Up", written by B-Real.

No.	Title	Length
1.	"What Will Become?"	3:24
2.	"Damaged"	3:03
3.	"Digimortal"	3:04
4.	"No One"	3:37
5.	"Linchpin"	3:25
6.	"Invisible Wounds (Dark Bodies)"	3:54
7.	"Acres of Skin"	3:55
8.	"Back the Fuck Up" (featuring B-Real)	3:10
9.	"Byte Block"	5:21
10.	"Hurt Conveyor"	3:42
11.	"(Memory Imprints) Never End"	6:48
Total length:		43:23

Limited edition digipak
No.	Title	Length
12.	"Dead Man Walking"	3:16
13.	"Strain vs. Resistance"	3:25
14.	"Repentance"	2:40
15.	"Full Metal Contact" (instrumental)	2:28
Total length:		55:12

== Personnel ==
Fear Factory

- Burton C. Bell − lead vocals (credited as "Resonating Biodroid")
- Dino Cazares − guitars ("Energized Riff Traumatizer")
- Christian Olde Wolbers − bass ("Subsonic Assassin"), backing vocals ("Auxiliary Resonator")
- Raymond Herrera − drums ("Automated Rhythmic Attacker")

Additional personnel

- Rhys Fulber − keyboards ("Force Activated Keyboards"), programming ("Mechanical Programming")
- John Bechdel − keyboards ("Live Activated Keyboards"), programming ("Programming Engineered"), add. keyboards ("Additional Keys Generated") (11)
- Jordan Plotnikoff − vocals ("Child's Vox") (1)
- B-Real − effects ("Enhancements") (5), vocals ("Auxiliary Vox") (8)
- Billy Sherwood − arrangements ("Harmony Vox Arrangements") (3, 6)
- Malcolm Springer − arrangements ("Additional Pre-production Arrangements Supported")

Production

- Rhys Fulber − production
- Paul Silveira − engineering
- Huey Dee − pre-production
- John Anonymous − pre-production
- Robert Breen − assistant engineering
- Oscar Ramirez − assistant engineering
- George Marino − mastering
- Mike Plotnikoff − mixing, technical engineering
- Tom Jermann − artistic direction
- Neil Zlozower − photography

== Charts ==
=== Album ===
Chart (2001)	Peak position
US Billboard 200	32
Top Canadian Albums	17
US Independent Albums (Billboard)	1

=== Singles ===
Year	Single	Chart	Peak position
2001	"Linchpin"	US Mainstream Rock (Billboard)	31
