= Raymond Herrera =

American drummer

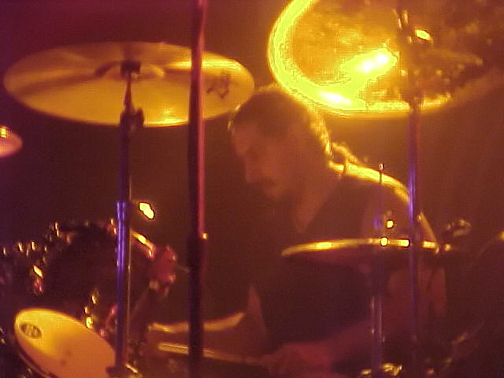
- Herrera live with Fear Factory

Background information
- Born: December 18, 1972 (age 53); Los Angeles, California
- Genres: Industrial metal; groove metal; death metal; nu metal; rap metal; metalcore; grindcore
- Occupations: Musician, composer, producer
- Instrument: Drums
- Years active: 1989–present
- Formerly of: Arkea; Asesino; Brujeria; Burn it All; Fear Factory; Kush; LA's Infidels; Phobia

Raymond Herrera (born December 18, 1972) is an American musician, best known as the former drummer and founding member of the industrial metal band Fear Factory. He is also a former drummer for Brujeria and for industrial metal band Arkaea. He is a composer and producer of music for video games, television, feature films, and transmedia.

== Career ==
His commercial album debut was Fear Factory's Soul of a New Machine in 1992. The band soon began a nearly two decade long recording and touring schedule including more than twelve commercial album releases and numerous world tours. He is known for his high speed playing, particularly his "stop go" double bass technique rather than the usual "flooring face" style.

In 1996, Herrera started to secure music licensing of Fear Factory's music for dozens of video games. He started Herrera Productions (renamed 3volution Productions in 2003) and worked as composer-producer on numerous video games. This includes the first two Tom Clancy's Ghost Recon Advanced Warfighter, Tom Clancy's Rainbow Six: Lockdown, Scarface: The World is Yours, and Iron Man 2.

In 2006, Herrera started the recording studio Temple Studios LLC and co-created the beverage company Redux Beverages LLC. In 2008, he played drums with Arkaea, including former Fear Factory band member Christian Olde Wolbers, and Jon Howard and Pat Kavanagh from Threat Signal. The band released the album Years in the Darkness. In 2009, he started Alt-Strum Productions (ASP). In 2010, he co-created Freedom To Rock, a 501c3 non-profit organization, and is on the board of directors. In 2011–2012, Herrera worked with Power A to help develop the FUS1ON Gaming controller.

In 2013 Raymond joined Capital Source Network (CSN), a company Raymond helped create. Capital Source Network is a beverage industry one-stop shop, specializing in brokering, test marketing, distribution and financial services. CSN represents a wide variety of brands, from vitamin enhanced waters to energy supplements. The company has offices in California, Indiana and Michigan.

In 2015 Raymond started 3volution Organics with his wife Paula Herrera. The company specializes in organic products in the natural industry. The company started in the west coast region of California. The company became a national broker in 2017 and has expanded into E-Commerce and international Brick and Mortar and international E-commerce in early 2021.

== Equipment and endorsements ==
- Pro-mark drum sticks
- Zildjian cymbals
- DW pedals (5000 series)
- Attack drum heads
- Tama Drums

Power Tower custom rack system, Tama hardware including Wide Rider drum throne, two DW5000 bass drum pedals, Attack drum heads, ddrum4 triggers, Korg D1200 studio and Pro-Mark 5A Oakwood nylon tip sticks. More details about his drum setup available.

== Games ==
Year	Game	Platform	Notes
1995	Mortal Kombat		Movie and CD Soundtrack
1997	Carmageddon	DOS, Macintosh	
1997	Wing Commander Prophecy	PC/Game Boy Advance	
1998	NFL Xtreme	PlayStation	
1998	Test Drive 5	PlayStation/PC	
1998	Test Drive Off-Road 2	PlayStation/PC	
1999	Carmageddon	PlayStation	
1999	Demolition Racer	PlayStation/PC/Dreamcast	
1999	Hydro Thunder		TV Commercial
1999	Test Drive 6	PlayStation/PC/Dreamcast/Game Boy Color	
2000	Messiah	PC	
2000	Gran Turismo 2	PlayStation	
2000	Gran Turismo - Music At The Speed Of Sound		Videogame Soundtrack
2001	Frequency	PlayStation 2	
2002	Resident Evil		Movie and CD Soundtrack
2002	Terminator: Dawn Of Fate	PlayStation 2/Xbox	Soundtrack
2003	NFL Gameday 2004	PlayStation/PlayStation 2	
2004	Greg Hasting's Tournament Paintball	Xbox	
2005	Greg Hasting's Tournament Paintball Max’d	Xbox/Game Boy Advance/ Nintendo DS/PlayStation 2	
2005	Battlefield 2 Modern Combat	PlayStation 2/Xbox 360	
2005	Blitz The League	PlayStation 2/Xbox/Xbox 360/PSP/Wii	
2005	WWE Smackdown VS RAW 2006	PlayStation 2/PSP	
2005	Colosseum Road To Freedom	PlayStation 2	
2005	Infected	Sony PSP	
2005	Taxi Driver	E3 Demo Xbox 360	
2005	Tom Clancy's Rainbow Six: Lockdown	Xbox/GameCube/PC/Mobile/PlayStation 2	CD Soundtrack
2006	WWE Smackdown VS RAW 2007	PlayStation 2/PSP/Xbox 360	
2006	Jaws Unleashed	PlayStation 2, Xbox, PC	
2006	Scarface The World Is Yours	PC/PlayStation 2/Xbox/Wii	
2006	Final Fight Streetwise	PlayStation 2/Xbox	
2007	Tom Clancy's Ghost Recon Advanced Warfighter	PC/PS2/Xbox 360	
2008	Too Human	Xbox 360	
2008	Battle Of The Bands	Wii	
2008	Rockband 2	Xbox 360, PlayStation 3, Nintendo Wii	
2009	MX VS ATV Reflex	Nintendo DS/PlayStation 3/Sony PSP/Xbox 360/PC	
2009	Wheelman	PlayStation 3/Xbox 360/PC	
2010	Nail’d	PlayStation 3/PC/Xbox 360	
2010	Iron Man 2	PlayStation 3/PC/Xbox 360/PSP/Nintendo DS/iPhone	
2010	Rockband 3	Xbox 360	
2011	MX VS ATV Alive	PlayStation 3/Xbox 360	
2011	Need For Speed The Run	PlayStation 3, Xbox 360	
2014	MX Vs. ATV Supercross	PlayStation 3, Xbox 360	

== Discography ==
=== With Fear Factory ===
- Concrete (recorded in 1991 and released on July 30, 2002)
- Soul of a New Machine (1992)
- Demanufacture (1995)
- Obsolete (1998)
- Digimortal (2001)
- Archetype (2004)
- Transgression (2005)

=== With Brujeria ===
- Matando Güeros (1993)
- Raza Odiada (1995)
- Brujerizmo (2000)

=== With Asesino ===
- Corridos de Muerte (2002)

=== With Phobia ===
- Return to Desolation (1994)

=== With Arkaea ===
- Years in the Darkness (2009)
