= Robert J. Sexton =

American producer and director

- Born: Robert Joseph Sexton; St. Louis, Missouri, U.S.
- Other names: Bob Sexton; Rev; Rock 'n' Roll Bobb Sexton
- Education: Middlesex College; School of Visual Arts; LACC
- Occupations: Film producer, director, writer, musician, content creator
- Political party: No Party Preference (2019–present)
- Other political affiliations: Democratic Party (before 2019)
- Spouse: Suzi Hale (m. 2010)
- Awards: Three Emmy Awards
- Website: Official website

Robert Joseph Sexton is an American director, producer, writer, and former musician, best known for his work on music videos and with virtual reality. He has won three Emmy Awards for his work as a producer and was a post-production producer of Paul McCartney's Live Kisses, which won two Grammy Awards in 2013.

== Early life ==
Sexton was born in St. Louis, Missouri. As an infant, his family moved to New Brunswick, New Jersey, where his maternal grandmother had settled. His mother, uncle, and maternal grandmother and grandfather were Holocaust survivors from Lithuania who had been forced into a concentration camp by the Nazis. Their survival and resilience became a defining part of his family’s history.

Sexton earned a degree in business and marketing from Middlesex College before continuing his education at the School of Visual Arts in New York City. He later receive a film and television production certificate from LACC, further honing his skills in the entertainment industry.

== Career ==
=== Music ===
As a teenager, Sexton joined the seminal metal-punk band Genöcide under the stage name Rock 'n' Roll Bobb Sexton. The band was fronted by vocalist Bobby Ebz, noted for spending GG Allin's final day with him. The drummer for Genöcide was Brian "Damage" Keats (Misfits) and Pete "Damien" Marshall (Iggy Pop, Samhain) briefly played second guitar before the band broke up. During the years Sexton played with the band, they released the albums Reign of Terror and Guttercat. The band's breakthrough album was Submit to Genöcide, which was recorded at Broccoli Rabe Studios engineered by Al Theurer (Wendy O. Williams, Kiss, Joan Jett, Carly Simon).

Sexton played with the "supergroup" Undesirables, before founding the band Pound of Flesh, which recorded a demo tape with Pete "Pistol Pete" Powers (Genöcide) and friends Joe Wood and Mitch Dean from T.S.O.L.. Sexton then founded One Bad Eye, whose self-titled debut album Self-Titled was engineered by Matt Pakucko (Dinosaur Jr., Frank Black, Def Leppard, Rage Against the Machine).

=== Music videos ===
After relocating to Los Angeles from the East Coast, Sexton began his career in the film industry as an editor. Meeting director Brian Smith in an editing bay, he was offered a job as a production manager. Working alongside Smith, Sexton worked as a production manager on videos for Shakira, Sublime, and Ricky Martin. Sexton went on to produce music videos for country artists including Brad Paisley, Toby Keith, Trace Adkins, Reba McEntire, and Clint Black; rock artists including Marilyn Manson, Alice Glass, OK Go, and John Fogerty; hip-hop artists including Busta Rhymes; and Christian artists including Skillet, KJ-52, and ZOEgirl.

Sexton then moved largely into directing. One of his videos for Incite, which premiered on The Wall Street Journal, was the first ever narrative-driven heavy metal virtual reality video. In his career, he has directed music videos for artists including Soulfly for Unleash, Hellyeah (featuring Vinnie Paul from Pantera), Michael Schenker, the Dwarves, Kataklysm, The Devil Wears Prada, and Cavalera Conspiracy.

=== Virtual reality ===
Sexton's entrance into the world of virtual reality was with his creation of "cinematic virtual reality", the technique of blending together traditional film techniques with virtual reality. His most notable work in this realm is his short Psycho City, TX. Of cinematic virtual reality, he told LA Weekly, "Your brain thinks it's a real event that's happening and remembers it as something real."

== Personal life ==
Sexton lives and works in the Hollywood Dell neighborhood of Hollywood, California. He has been married to makeup artist Suzi Hale since June 5, 2010. Their wedding was held at the Psycho House on the Universal Studios Backlot, the first and only wedding to ever be held there, which had to be officially approved by the Alfred Hitchcock Foundation.

=== Public service ===
In 2018, Sexton was appointed Block Captain of the Hollywood Dell Neighborhood Watch. In 2021, Sexton joined the publicly-elected Hollywood United Neighborhood Council as a Business Representative, subsequently becoming a board member of their Social Services & Homelessness Committee.

=== Politics ===
On July 31, 2019, Sexton announced an independent run for California State Assembly, in order to represent the 43rd District. Alongside the primary issue of homelessness, his challenge to incumbent Laura Friedman was largely focused on the issues of supporting rent stabilization and opposing the results of 2014 and 2016 California ballot measures Proposition 47 and Proposition 57. Sexton placed third in the primary on March 3, 2020. In a statement given to the Los Angeles Times on March 5, Sexton stated that he was disappointed by the results but hoped to have "started important conversations and changed the dialogue."

== Filmography ==
=== Music videos ===
Year	Title	Role	Artist
1997	"Wrong Way"	production manager	Sublime
1998	"Zoot Suit Riot"	production manager	Cherry Poppin' Daddies
1998	"Don't Rush (Take Love Slowly)"	production manager	K-Ci & JoJo
1998	"Perdido Sin Ti"	production manager	Ricky Martin
1999	"She's in Love"	producer	Mark Wills
1999	"Le Boo"	producer	¡Laughing Us!
2002	"Envy"	producer	Ash
2003	"Save It For A Rainy Day"	producer	The Jayhawks
2003	"Unbroken (Hotel Baby)"	assistant director	Monster Magnet
2003	"The Reckoning"	producer	Iced Earth
2006	"Bent"	director	Hang Men
2007	"Over You"	director	Dwarves
2007	"Signs of Life"	director	Graceland
2007	"FEFU"	director, producer	Dwarves
2008	"Chaos Theory"	director, executive producer	Amen
2009	"Big Dog Daddy"	post-production producer	Toby Keith
2009	"Pistolero Sleep"	director	Pigmy Love Circus
2011	"Poker Night"	post-production producer	Toby Keith w/ Ted Nugent
2011	"Dethroned"	director	Death Angel
2011	"Killing Inside"	director	Cavalera Conspiracy
2012	"Tales from the West"	post-production producer	Toby Keith
2012	"Unleash"	director	Soulfly
2012	"The Day After The World Ended"	director, co-executive producer	R2A
2012	"Truce"	director	Death Angel
2013	"Feral Children"	director	Prima Donna
2013	"The Toughest"	"Lord of the Wasteland"	Toby Keith
2013	"Wasted"	director	Delirium Tremens
2014	"Sailor's Prayer"	director	The Devil Wears Prada
2014	"Moth"	director	Hellyeah
2014	"Sangre Por Sangre"	director	Hellyeah
2015	"Fallen"	director	Incite
2015	"Hush"	director	Hellyeah
2015	"WTF"	director	Hellyeah
2016	"No Remorse"	director	Incite
2016	"One More Song"	production manager, "Virile Mixologist"	Jack Tempchin
2016	"Human"	director, executive producer	Hellyeah
2016	"The Slaughter"	director, cinematographer	Incite
2018	"Narcissist"	director	Kataklysm
2018	"In The Land of the Blind"	producer	Rick Springfield
2018	"Outsider"	director	Kataklysm
2018	"The Voodoo House"	producer	Rick Springfield
2023	"Canisi"	director, editor, executive producer	Twenty7

=== Virtual reality ===
Year	Title	Role	Notes
2015	Archangel	director	Soulfly music video
2015	Life's Disease	director	Incite music video
2016	West Coast Customs 360° VR Experience	director, executive producer	
2016	Ghost Scream: 360° VR	director	
2017	Psycho City, TX: 360° VR Video Experience	director, writer, "Minister of Piece"	
2018	Meat: VR	director	

=== Other media ===
Year	Title	Role	Notes
2005	Legion: The Word Made Flesh	director, co-writer	short
2008	Remembering Phil	"Phil's Cellmate"	feature film
2009	Sexy Feast	director	short
2009	Culinary Seduction	director	short
2009	Carolyn's Healthy Goodies	director	short
2010	The Disassembly Line	director, writer, executive producer	short
2011	Areola 51	director, producer	TV movie
2011	Citizen Skywatch	director	short
2012	Paul McCartney's Live Kisses	post-production producer	documentary
2013	Down The Rabbit Hole with Rat Scabies	director, writer, producer	short
2013	Left Turn At Zeta Reticula	director	commercial
2013	Strip Away The Lies	director, producer	commercial
2013	Sleep No More	director, producer	short
2013	Psycho City, TX	director, executive producer	short
2013	Lost Weekend with the Mingler	director, executive producer	TV special
2013	But with a Whisper	director, executive producer	short
2015	32° of Separation	director	short
2017	Somewhere Between Darkness and Dawn	producer, assistant director	short
2019	Thirsty	production consultant	short
2025	Little Pet	"Party Fiend"	feature film
2026	Deep Tissue	producer	feature film

== Awards and nominations ==
Year	Award	Category	Work	Result	Ref.
2005	Tabloid Witch Award	Best Horror Short Film	Legion: The Word Made Flesh	Won	
2020	Black Rose Award	Outstanding Achievement in Directing	Work in virtual reality	Won	
