= Oppression (disambiguation) =

Oppression is the negative outcome experienced by people targeted by the cruel exercise of power in a society or social group.

Oppression may also refer to:

- Oppression (album), by Incite, 2016
- "Oppression", a song by Ben Harper from Fight for Your Mind
- Oppression remedy, a concept in corporate law
