= Lauren Hart =

Lauren Hart may refer to:

- Lauren Hart (American pop singer) (born 1967), American pop anthem singer
- Lauren Hart (heavy metal musician) (born 1986), American heavy metal singer
