= Scar Weaver =

Studio album by Once Human
- Released: February 11, 2022
- Recorded: 2019–2021
- Genres: Groove metal; melodic death metal
- Length: 41:00
- Label: earMUSIC
- Producer: Logan Mader

Once Human chronology
| Evolution (2017) | Scar Weaver (2022) |

Singles from Scar Weaver
- 1. "Deadlock" Released: July 2, 2021; 2. "Only in Death" Released: October 2, 2021; 3. "Cold Arrival" Released: November 19, 2021; 4. "Erasure" Released: January 14, 2022; 5. "Scar Weaver" Released: February 14, 2022

Professional ratings
Review scores
| Source | Rating |
|---|---|
| Ghost Cult Magazine | 8/10 |
| Kerrang! | 4/5 |
| Noizze | 8/10 |
| Powermetal.de | 7/10 |
| Rock Hard | 6.5/10 |

Scar Weaver is the third studio album by American metal band Once Human. It was released on February 11, 2022, via earMUSIC. The band released several singles for the album, including "Deadlock" which features guitarist Logan Mader's former Machine Head bandmate Robb Flynn on July 1, 2021.

== Background and composition ==
After the release of the band's previous album Evolution, vocalist Lauren Hart toured with Kamelot while Mader toured with Machine Head. During then, guitarist Max Karon wrote and recorded all of the guitars for the album himself. By the time the remainder of Machine Head's Burn My Eyes anniversary tour was postponed due to the COVID-19 pandemic and Mader returned to Los Angeles, Karon had already recorded all of the 10 songs that would appear in the album, and Hart began writing her lyrics over them. Although Mader did not record his own guitar work for the album as he was impressed by Karon's output, he worked with Hart to track her vocals. At the time, Hart was battling depression, anxiety, and writer's block, as a result of the pandemic and the death of a close friend, the latter event inspiring the song "Cold Arrival".

Scar Weaver shows the band focusing stylistically "more on their modern groove foundation", distancing from their earlier death metal roots, though melodic death metal is still prevalent with additional progressive metal elements. This direction is considered "a huge improvement and holds them in an even stronger position, healthy evidence that showcases Once Human are more powerful and dedicated than ever."

== Track listing ==
| No. | Title | Length |
|---|---|---|
| 1. | "Eidolon" | 3:50 |
| 2. | "Deadlock" | 3:28 |
| 3. | "Scar Weaver" | 4:19 |
| 4. | "Bottom Feeder" | 5:08 |
| 5. | "Where the Bones Lie" | 3:38 |
| 6. | "Erasure" | 4:45 |
| 7. | "Deserted" | 3:54 |
| 8. | "We Ride" (Strapping Young Lad cover) | 2:47 |
| 9. | "Cold Arrival" | 4:13 |
| 10. | "Only in Death" | 4:58 |
| Total length: | | 41:00 |

== Credits ==
- Lauren Hart - vocals
- Max Karon - guitars
- Damian Rainaud - bass
- Dillon Trollope - drums

Production

- Logan Mader - engineering, mixing, production, guitars (credited but does not perform)
- Max Karon - engineering, mixing, mastering
- Seth Anton - artwork

Additional musicians

- Robb Flynn - additional vocals on "Deadlock"
