= Hollywood Hills =

Neighborhood of Los Angeles, California

- Neighborhood
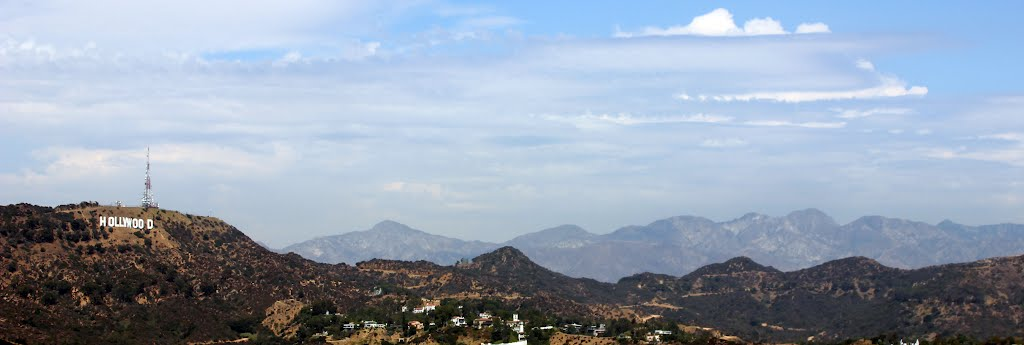
- The Hollywood Hills and the Hollywood Sign

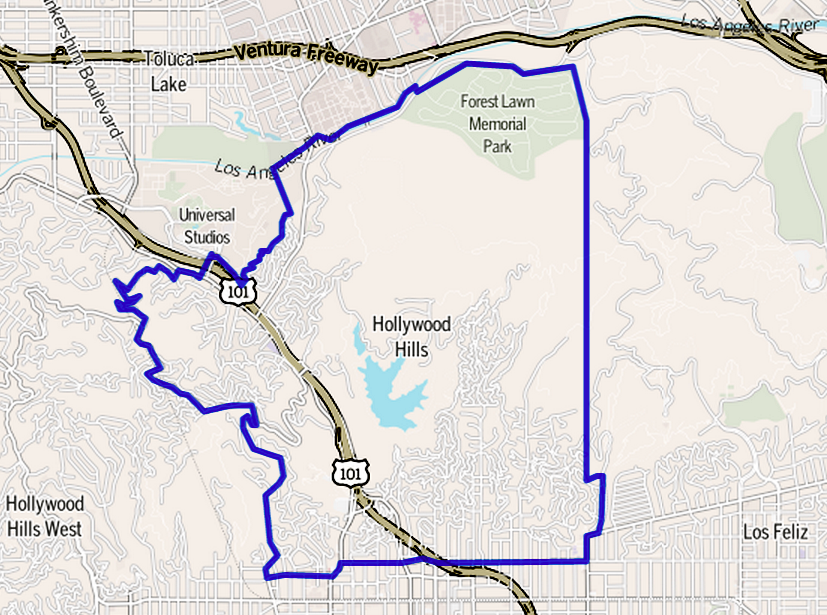
- Map of the Hollywood Hills neighborhood of Los Angeles, as delineated by the Los Angeles Times

- Location within Central Los Angeles
- Coordinates: 34.12°N 118.34°W
- Country: United States
- State: California
- City: Los Angeles
- Elevation: 1,260 ft (380 m)

The Hollywood Hills is a residential neighborhood in the central region of Los Angeles, California. It borders Studio City, Universal City and Burbank on the north, Griffith Park on the north and east, Los Feliz on the southeast, Hollywood on the south and Hollywood Hills West on the west. It includes Forest Lawn Memorial Park, Mount Sinai Memorial Park Cemetery, the Hollywood Reservoir, the Hollywood Sign, the Hollywood Bowl and the John Anson Ford Theater.

== Geography ==
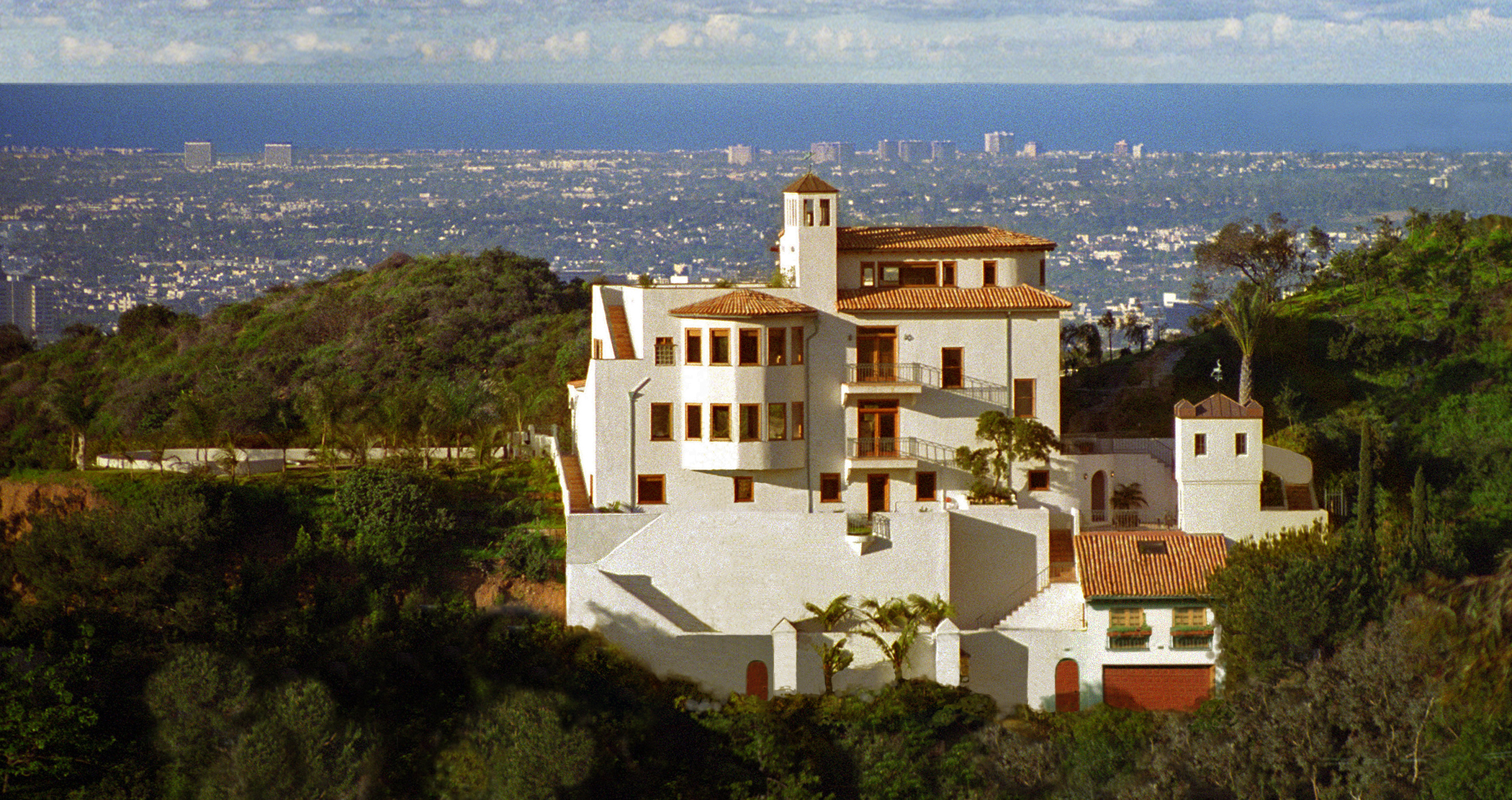
A mansion in the Hollywood Hills

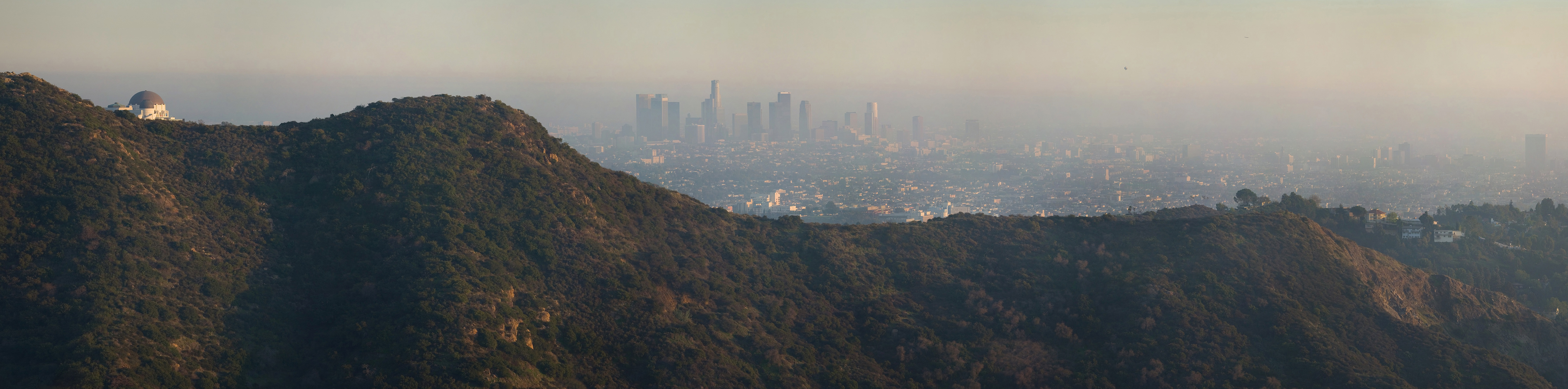
View from the Hollywood Hills

The Hollywood Hills straddle the Cahuenga Pass within the Santa Monica Mountains. It is bisected southeast–northwest by US 101. The neighborhood is bounded on the northwest and north by the Los Angeles city line, on the east by a fireroad through Griffith Park, continuing on Western Avenue, on the south by Franklin Avenue and on the west by an irregular line that includes Outpost Drive.

=== Neighborhoods ===
Hollywood Hills comprises several neighborhoods:

- Laurel Canyon (incl. Mount Olympus)
- Beachwood Canyon
- The Bird Streets
- Cahuenga Pass
- Franklin Village
- Hollywood Dell
- Hollywood Heights
- Hollywoodland
- Outpost Estates
- Whitley Heights

== Demographics ==
According to the 2000 U.S. census, 21,588 people lived in the neighborhood's 7.05 square miles, averaging 3,063 people per square mile. It is among the lowest population densities in the city and county. The population was estimated at 22,988 in 2008. The median age for residents was 37, considered old for the city and the county. The percentages of residents aged 19 to 64 were among the county's highest.

The neighborhood has a diversity index of 0.433, and the percentage of Non-Hispanic Whites is 74.1%. Latinos make up 9.4%, Asians are at 6.7%, African American at 4.6% and others at 5.3%. In 2000, Mexico (7.9%) and the United Kingdom (7.8%) were the most common places of birth for the 22.8% of the residents who were born abroad, which was considered a low percentage of foreign-born when compared with the city or county as a whole.

The median household income in 2008 dollars was $69,277, considered high for the city but about average for the county. The percentage of households earning $125,000 or more was high, compared to the county at large. The average household size of 1.8 people was relatively low. Renters occupied 56.5% of the housing units, and homeowners the rest.

In 2000, there were 270 families headed by single parents, or 6.9%, a rate that was low in both the county and the city.

== Arts and culture ==
The neighborhood of Hollywood Hills includes the Hollywood Bowl and Forest Lawn Memorial Park (Hollywood Hills) as well as three private and two public schools. The neighborhood includes:

- The John Anson Ford Amphitheatre
- A portion of Griffith Park, including Hollywoodland Camp
- Mount Sinai Memorial Park Cemetery
- The former Monastery of the Angels, closed 1922

== Education ==
In 2000, 54.8% of residents aged 25 and older held a four-year degree, considered high when compared with the city and the county as a whole.

There are five secondary or elementary schools within the neighborhood's boundaries:

- Immaculate Heart High and Middle School, private, 5515 Franklin Avenue
- Valley View Elementary School, LAUSD, 6921 Woodrow Wilson Drive
- The Neilson Academy, private, 2528 Canyon Drive
- Cheremoya Avenue Elementary School, LAUSD, 6017 Franklin Avenue
- The Oaks, private elementary, 6817 Franklin Avenue

The American Film Institute is at 2021 North Western Avenue.

== Notable people ==
- Avicii (1989–2018), DJ and producer
- Christina Aguilera, singer and songwriter
- Tim Allen, actor and comedian
- Earle D. Baker (1888–1969), Los Angeles City Council member
- Ashley Benson, actress
- Jolene Blalock, actress
- Emily Blunt, actress
- Russell Brand, actor and comedian
- Gisele Bündchen, model
- Camila Cabello, singer and songwriter
- Sam Cooke (1931–1964), singer
- Kevin Costner, actor
- Robert Culp (1930–2010), actor
- Rivers Cuomo, singer, songwriter, guitarist
- Elisha Cuthbert, actress
- William De Los Santos, author, poet, screenwriter, producer, film director
- Diplo, EDM artist
- Richard Dreyfuss, actor
- Chris Evans, actor
- Anna Faris, actress
- Errol Flynn (1909–1959), actor
- Lady Gaga, singer, songwriter, and actress
- David Giuntoli, actor
- Ariana Grande, singer, songwriter, and actress
- Stuart Hamblen (1908–1989), country singer
- Calvin Harris, DJ
- Salma Hayek, actress
- Werner Herzog, director
- Calum Hood, singer-songwriter and bassist in 5 Seconds of Summer
- Niall Horan, singer and songwriter
- Helen Hunt, actress
- Josh Hutcherson, actor
- Billy Idol, musician
- Ashton Irwin, singer-songwriter and drummer in 5 Seconds of Summer
- Rick James (1948–2004), musician
- Michael Jeter (1952–2003), actor
- Chuck Jones (1912–2002), artist and animated cartoon director
- Anna Kendrick, actress and singer
- Annie Lennox, member of Eurythmics
- Jared Leto, actor, Thirty Seconds to Mars member
- Tom Leykis, radio and internet talk show personality
- Sondra Locke (1944–2018), actress and film director
- Eva Longoria, actress
- Demi Lovato, singer, songwriter, and actress
- Anthony Perkins (1932–1992), actor and director
- Tobey Maguire, actor
- Rooney Mara, actor
- Blake Masters, screenwriter, director, and producer
- Johnny Mathis, singer
- Joel McHale, comedian and actor
- Simon Monjack (1970–2010), director, producer and writer
- Brittany Murphy (1977–2009), actress
- Kristin Nelson, actress and painter
- Ricky Nelson (1940–1985), actor, singer, and songwriter
- Tracy Nelson, actress
- Roland Orzabal, singer, songwriter, record producer, and author
- Matthew Perry (1969–2023), actor
- Joaquin Phoenix, actor
- Johnny Lever, actor
- Chris Pratt, actor
- Keanu Reeves, actor
- Andy Samberg, actor
- Robert J. Sexton, producer and director
- J.K. Simmons, actor
- Troye Sivan, singer-songwriter, actor, and YouTuber
- Kevin Smith, actor, director, and comedian
- Jason Statham, actor
- Sage Stallone (1976–2012), actor and son of Sylvester Stallone
- Robert J. Stevenson and Peggy Stevenson, Los Angeles City Council members
- Quentin Tarantino, film director
- Justin Timberlake, singer and actor
- Bitsie Tulloch, actress
- Casey Wasserman, entertainment executive and sports agent, president of the Los Angeles Olympic Organizing Committee
- Tuesday Weld, actress
- Rebel Wilson, actress, comedian, and singer

== See also ==
- Lloyd G. Davies, Los Angeles City Council member, 1943–51, active against gravel extraction in the hills
- P-22, a mountain lion who resided in the Hollywood Hills
