= Built to Destroy =

Built to Destroy may refer to:

- Built to Destroy (Michael Schenker Group album), 1983 album by Michael Schenker Group
- Built to Destroy (Incite album), 2019 album by Incite
