= Love Is Gone (album) =

Studio album by Dommin
- Released: February 2, 2010
- Recorded: 2009
- Studio: Edge of the Earth Studios, Los Angeles
- Genre: Gothic rock
- Length: 51:30
- Label: Roadrunner
- Producer: Lucas Banker; Logan Mader

Dommin chronology
Dommin E.P. (2009)	Love Is Gone (2010)	Rise (2015)

Alternative cover
- Special Edition cover

Love is Gone is the second studio album by American rock band, Dommin, released on February 2, 2010 in the United States and February 15, 2010 in the United Kingdom. Although it is their debut album under the Roadrunner Records label, Mend Your Misery, released four years prior, is their debut studio album overall. Six of the twelve tracks from Mend Your Misery were re-released on Love is Gone; all of them, including their song "My Heart, Your Hands", being re-recorded or remixed for this album.

== Background ==
Dommin entered the studio in 2009 to begin working on Love Is Gone, with Lucas Banker and Logan Mader producing. The album was recorded at the Edge of the Earth Studios in Los Angeles, California, while the drum parts were recorded at the Lair Studio also in Los Angeles. Love Is Gone was mixed and mastered by Logan Mader. "Remember", the final song on the record, was produced and mixed by Junkie XL. Upon release, Love Is Gone debuted at number 21 on the US Top Heatseekers chart.

A special edition of Love is Gone was also released and contains three additional tracks not included on the original album. The three additional songs are "(I Just) Died in Your Arms", a rendition of the famous Cutting Crew song, "Heaven's Sake" and "Awake", the final track from their Dommin E.P. (2009). "(I Just) Died In Your Arms" features a collaboration with Tomo Miličević from Thirty Seconds to Mars, who contributed lead guitars to the track. The special edition was made available in a digital download format only.

== Critical reception ==
Professional ratings
Review scores
Source	Rating
AllMusic	1.5/5 stars
Blistering	7/10
Kerrang!	4/5 stars
Metal Hammer	3.5/5 stars
musicOMH	3/5 stars
PopMatters	7/10 stars
Rock Sound	7/10

Upon release, Love Is Gone received mostly positive reviews from music critics. Chris Colgan from PopMatters felt that the album features a number of aspects that make Dommin "stand out from the pack", including the "excellent singing" of vocalist and lead guitarist Kristofer Dommin. Colgan described his "soulful" voice as "completely unique", carrying the "best elements" of many different influences, including 1950s crooners and 1960s soul, but also a dark alternative styles of bands like Depeche Mode and Staind.

Max Barrett from Blistering wrote that "the heart and soul of Love Is Gone clearly stems from the lyrics of frontman Kristofer Dommin, who gives an inspiring performance where his heartache and torment is laid on a platter for the listener".

== Track listing ==
All tracks are written by Kristofer Dommin, except where noted.

No.	Title	Writer(s)	Length
1.	"My Heart, Your Hands"		4:32
2.	"New"	Dommin; David Gordoni	3:54
3.	"Evenfall Hollow"		0:46
4.	"Tonight"		3:12
5.	"Love is Gone"		4:08
6.	"Dark Holiday"	Dommin; Konstantine	3:17
7.	"Without End"	Dommin; Gordoni; Erin Johnson	4:10
8.	"Within Reach"		1:15
9.	"Closure"	Dommin; Konstantine	4:18
10.	"Making the Most"	Dommin; Konstantine	4:22
11.	"One Feeling"		2:42
12.	"I Still Lost"	Dommin; Lucas Banker	4:07
13.	"One Eye Open"	Dommin; Banker	0:54
14.	"Honestly"	Dommin; Banker; Logan Mader	4:56
15.	"Remember"	Dommin; Banker; Mader; Tom Holkenborg	5:03
Total length:			51:30

Love Is Gone – Special edition
No.	Title	Writer(s)	Length
16.	"(I Just) Died In Your Arms"	Nick Van Eede	4:53
17.	"Heaven's Sake"	Dommin; Banker	3:26
18.	"Awake"	Gordoni	4:54
Total length:			64:43
