= Bringer of Plagues =

Studio album by Divine Heresy
- Released: July 28, 2009
- Recorded: Edge of the Earth Studios, Hollywood, California
- Genres: Metalcore, death metal, groove metal
- Length: 45:38
- Labels: Century Media (United States); Roadrunner (worldwide)
- Producer: Logan Mader

Divine Heresy chronology
Bleed the Fifth (2007)	Bringer of Plagues (2009)

Professional ratings
Review scores
Source	Rating
AllMusic	3.5/5 stars
Kerrang!	(3/5)
Sputnikmusic	(3/5)

Bringer of Plagues is the second studio album by American metal band Divine Heresy, released on July 28, 2009. It is the band's only album to feature vocalist Travis Neal and bassist Joe Payne, and the last to feature drummer Tim Yeung.

On June 3, 2009, two new songs from the album, titled "Undivine Prophecies" and "Facebreaker", were posted on the band's MySpace page.

The album sold around 3,000 copies in the United States in its first week to debut at position No. 148 on the Billboard 200 chart.

== Critical reception ==
According to Kerrang!, the album sees Dino Cazares "honing his partnership with ex-Nile sticksman Tim Yeung to the point of thunderous, jaw-dropping intensity and roping in the vocal talents of alarmingly diverse newcomer Travis Neal." Still, "there's little new ground broken here and attempted slow/heavy dynamics are often poorly executed, leaving the feeling that although accomplished, this is metal on demand rather than any kind of real statement of the heart," warns reviewer Sam Low, giving it the 3/5 rating.

== Track listing ==
All lyrics are written by Travis Neal, except "The Battle of J. Casey" written by Jason Casey; all music is composed by Dino Cazares, Tim Yeung and Joe Payne.

No.	Title	Length
1.	"Facebreaker"	3:42
2.	"The Battle of J. Casey"	3:42
3.	"Undivine Prophecies (Intro)" (instrumental)	1:07
4.	"Bringer of Plagues"	3:40
5.	"Redefine"	3:46
6.	"Anarchaos"	4:40
7.	"Monolithic Doomsday Devices"	5:24
8.	"Letter to Mother"	3:36
9.	"Enemy Kill"	3:11
10.	"Darkness Embedded"	4:34
11.	"The End Begins"	4:58

Japanese edition bonus track
No.	Title	Length
12.	"Forever the Failure"	3:32

iTunes bonus track
No.	Title	Length
13.	"Facebreaker (Instrumental Version)"	3:44

== Credits ==
Divine Heresy

- Travis Neal – vocals
- Dino Cazares – guitars
- Joe Payne – bass
- Tim Yeung – drums

Production

- Engineered, produced and mixed by Logan Mader and Lucas Banker for Dirty Icon Productions
- Co-Produced by Dino Cazares
- Mastered by Dirty Icon Productions
- Recorded, mixed and mastered at Edge of the Earth Studios, Hollywood, California
- Drums recorded at Mid City Sound
- Pre-production: Jeramiah Curo at DeadSpace Studios, Barona, California
- Orchestral arrangements on "The End Begins" by Jonathan Merkel
- Drums arrangements by John Sankey
- Keyboards on "Undivine Prophecies" and "The End Begins" by Jonathan Merkel
- Additional keyboards on "Darkness Embedded" by Rhys Fulber
- Guitar tech: Alex Lagos
- A&R by Scott Koenig (Divine Heresy) and Ray Harkins (Century Media)
- Photography by Glen LaFerman

== Charts ==
Chart (2009)	Peak position
Australian Albums (ARIA Charts)	69
