= Axis Percussion =

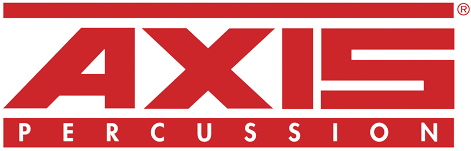
- Type: Private
- Industry: Musical instruments
- Founded: 1990; 36 years ago
- Headquarters: U.S.
- Products: Drum pedals
- Website: axispercussion.com

AXiS Pedal & Drum Co (formerly Axis Percussion) is a United States company specializing in the manufacture of precision drum pedals and drum hardware.

The company aims for high qualities of craftsmanship and makes use of aircraft grade aluminum and steel.

Some Axis pedals, called longboards, are unusual in having straight flat foot plates with no heel plates.

Users of Axis products include Tim Waterson (former title holder of "The world's fastest drummer"), who can hit 1407 double strokes a minute (about 352 bpm) and 1030 single strokes a minute (about 258 bpm), and Tim "The Missile" Yeung (Winner of the World's Fastest drummer battle of the feet 2006) who used the same pedals to hit 872 single strokes a minute (218bpm).
