= Dommin =

American rock band

Background information
- Origin: Los Angeles, California, U.S.
- Genres: Alternative rock, gothic rock
- Years active: 2000–present
- Label: Roadrunner Records (former)
- Members: Kristofer Dommin
- Past members: Billy James; Konstantine X Cameron Morris
- Website: dommin.com

Dommin is an American rock band formed in Los Angeles in 1999 by singer, songwriter, and guitarist Kristofer Dommin. They released their major label debut album, Love is Gone, in 2010 through Roadrunner Records before releasing subsequent albums Rise and Beautiful Crutch independently.

== History ==
=== Formation and Mend Your Misery (1999–2008) ===
Dommin's beginning can be traced back to 1999, from early demos Kristofer would record with his older brother, Stephen, playing drums. Over nearly an 8-year period, Dommin evolved into a performing rock band in the L.A. scene. Childhood friend, Billy James, originally joined as a keyboardist in late 2002. He eventually switched to bass when Konstantine joined the band in 2006. The last member to join Dommin was drummer Cameron Morris, who auditioned for the band and joined in 2008 to replace the vacancy left by Kristofer's older brother who went on to focus on his career and family.

In 2005, Kristofer unknowingly had one of his demos reach the ears of producer, songwriter and manager, Lucas Banker who had a production company with his partner Logan Mader, known for his involvement in Machine Head and Soulfly. The production duo agreed to record what would become the band's independent release called Mend Your Misery. The band took to the social networking site, MySpace, and began to promote their music, sell their CD and T-shirts and recorded a video for "My Heart, Your Hands," directed by the band's own Konstantine. Kristofer signed his publishing deal with Reverb, an independent UK publisher in June 2006. Through the efforts of Reverb Publishing and Dirty Icon Productions, Dommin's music was shopped to various labels and management. In late 2006, Dommin's efforts caught the attention of Monte Conner, Head of A&R at Roadrunner Records and signed with them in June 2008.

On January 1, 2020, Dommin announced that they have reissued Mend Your Misery to digital streaming services.

=== Love Is Gone (2009–2011) ===
Lead singer/guitarist and primary songwriter Kristofer Dommin

In February 2010, their major label debut Love Is Gone produced by Dirty Icon (Lucas Banker & Logan Mader) was released. One year prior to the album's release and all throughout 2009, Dommin opened for Combichrist, Wednesday 13, The Birthday Massacre and Lacuna Coil. They also performed at The Warped Tour in the United States.

The two official singles from "Love Is Gone" were "My Heart, Your Hands" and "Tonight." "My Heart, Your Hands" was featured as iTunes 'Song of The Week. The release coincided with the band's first trip to Europe with two back to back tours supporting Lacuna Coil and HIM. Dommin continued supporting HIM through their US tour and returned to Europe to perform at The Rock Am Ring/Rock Im Park festivals in Germany. They also opened the Main Stage on the final day of the Download Festival in the United Kingdom. That summer, Dommin received nominations as Best New Band and Best New International Artist at both of UK's Metal Hammer Awards and Kerrang Awards, respectively. In August, Dommin supported Volbeat and closed out the year supporting The Birthday Massacre and Black Veil Brides.

To commemorate the end of the "Love Is Gone" album cycle, a third video was self-directed and produced for the song "Closure." The band used photos and videos submitted by their fans with live footage as a tribute to the many lives that identified with the self-empowerment message of the song.

In early 2011, Dommin performed at the Soundwave Festival in Australia, which included a sideshow in Melbourne supporting Rob Zombie.

On February 2, 2020, to mark the 10-year anniversary of Love Is Gone, Dommin released a re-recorded version of the song "Dark Holiday" called the Decadent Version and an acoustic version they called Stripped Version.

=== Departure from Roadrunner Records, Rise, and Rare (2012–2015) ===
The band has been working on writing and recording for their follow up effort since 2011. According to a post made by the band on Dommin's official Facebook page the album will "most likely [be released] late Summer. August or September" of 2012.

On October 28, 2012, Dommin premiered a new song and video on their Facebook and official website, title "The Quiet Man".

On October 30, 2012, the band launched an updated website, with news that they have parted ways with Roadrunner. Shortly after, Kristofer Dommin expressed his and the band's current contractual situation and disappointment with Roadrunner, who still 'owns' the rights to some of their unreleased material and their second studio album, regardless of their dropping the band. This has led the group to a hiatus until all contractual obligations with Roadrunner are resolved and in return making the group 'free-agents' for a new contract.

In the midst of this, Kristofer Dommin has posted five songs on his personal Facebook, including a brand new track titled "Desire" (which for a period of time was given to fans for free along with a newsletter subscription), an incomplete track titled "I Die" with keyboardist Konstantine, a cover of Leonard Cohen's "Im Your Man", a cover of Depeche Mode's "Precious", and a cover of Sia's "Breathe Me".

On June 21, 2015, Dommin released the album Rise. The album was mixed by Joe Barresi.

Other songs released include cover songs of "Save A Prayer" by Duran Duran, "Love You To Death" by Type O Negative and "Cola" by Lana Del Rey.

Following the release of Rise, Dommin released Rare on September 13, 2016, a collection of b-sides and unreleased or previously unavailable tracks. Originally a special item available during a Pledge Music campaign with 14 tracks, Rare was then released publicly with 10 of the 14 tracks retained.

=== Beautiful Crutch (2016) ===
In December 2016, Dommin released their 3rd album titled "Beautiful Crutch."

In 2017, Dommin released a cover of Last Night I Dreamt That Somebody Loved Me by The Smiths.

=== Departure of remaining band members and untitled fourth album (2018–2024) ===
Between August 2018 and March 2019, Dommin released five singles to digital streaming services; "Beautiful As A Stranger" on May 25, 2018 with an accompanying music video., "Strings" on August 24, 2018, "Clearly" on August 31, "Upside Down" on October 26, 2018., and "Change" on March 9, 2019.

On January 2, 2024, lead singer and guitarist Kristofer Dommin Dommin released an update announcing a fourth studio album containing the previously released singles and ten new tracks. He also confirmed the departure of Billy James in January 2016, Konstantine X in 2018, and Cameron Morris in 2023, and that Dommin would continue as his solo project.

=== Dommin & The Oztones (2020–2022) ===
In 2019, lead singer Kristofer Dommin moved to Australia and released 4 singles and an E.P. called Retrospect, which includes previously recorded Dommin songs "New", "The Quiet Man" and "Tonight".

Dommin also collaborated with Australian rock & roll band The Oztones and released an album titled Dommin & the Oztones.

== Band members ==
=== Current members ===
- Kristofer Dommin – vocals/guitar (2000–present)

=== Former members ===
- Billy James – bass (2006–2016), keyboards (2002–2006)
- Konstantine X – keyboards (2006–2018)
- Cameron Morris – drums (2008–2023)

=== Session members ===
- Stephen Dommin – drums (2000–2008)

== Discography ==
=== Albums ===
- Mend Your Misery (December 2006)
- Dommin E.P. (July 7, 2009)
- Love Is Gone (February 2, 2010)
- Rise (June 15, 2015)
- Rare (September 13, 2016)
- Beautiful Crutch (December 22, 2016)
- Dommin & the Oztones (April 28, 2022)
- The Martyr (February 14, 2025)

=== Singles ===
- My Heart, Your Hands (January 11, 2010)
- Tonight (May 28, 2010)
- Beautiful As A Stranger (May 25, 2018)
- Strings (August 24, 2018)
- Clearly (August 31, 2018)
- Upside Down (October 26, 2018)
- Change (March 1, 2019)
- Dark Holiday [Decadent Version] (February 2, 2020)
