= I Am the Empire – Live from the 013 =

2020 live album by Kamelot

Live album by Kamelot
- Released: August 14, 2020
- Recorded: September 14, 2018
- Venue: 013 (Tilburg)
- Length: 105:10
- Label: Napalm

Kamelot live chronology
One Cold Winter's Night (2006)	I Am the Empire – Live from the 013 (2020)

I Am the Empire – Live from the 013 is the third live album by American power metal band Kamelot, released on August 14, 2020 via Napalm Records. It is the third live album and second live DVD/Blu-ray from the band. The album features guest appearances by Lauren Hart, Elize Ryd, Alissa White-Gluz and Charlotte Wessels.

It is the first release to feature Alex Landenburg as the band's drummer.

== Track listing ==
=== Disc one ===
No.	Title	Length
1.	"Transcendence (Intro)"	2:02
2.	"Phantom Divine (Shadow Empire)"	4:04
3.	"Rule the World"	3:47
4.	"Insomnia"	3:49
5.	"The Great Pandemonium"	4:34
6.	"When the Lights are Down"	4:20
7.	"My Confession"	7:15
8.	"Veil of Elysium"	4:24
9.	"Under Grey Skies"	5:11
10.	"RavenLight"	3:33
11.	"End of Innocence"	4:26
12.	"March of Mephisto"	5:52
13.	"Amnesiac"	3:53

=== Disc two ===
No.	Title	Length
14.	"Manus Dei"	0:36
15.	"Sacrimony (Angel of Afterlife)"	4:19
16.	"Drum and Keys Solo"	4:57
17.	"Here's to the Fall"	4:56
18.	"Forever"	14:12
19.	"Burns to Embrace"	8:45
20.	"Liar Liar (Wasteland Monarchy)"	5:07
21.	"Ministrium (Shadow Key)"	5:08

== Personnel ==
Kamelot

- Tommy Karevik – lead vocals
- Thomas Youngblood – guitars, backing vocals
- Sean Tibbetts – bass
- Oliver Palotai – keyboards
- Alex Landenburg – drums, percussion

Guest musicians

- Lauren Hart – guest vocals ("Phantom Divine (Shadow Empire)")
- Charlotte Wessels – guest vocals ("Under Grey Skies")
- Alissa White-Gluz – guest vocals ("March of Mephisto", "Sacrimony (Angel of Afterlife)", "Liar Liar (Wasteland Monarchy)")
- Elize Ryd – guest vocals ("March of Mephisto", "My Confession" and "Sacrimony (Angel of Afterlife)")
- Eklipse – string quartet on "My Confession"
  - Scarlett – violin
  - Miss E. – violin
  - Viola – viola
  - Helena – cello

Production

- Sascha Paeth – additional guitars ("RavenLight"), mixing, mastering
- Jens de Vos – director
- Tim Tronckoe – photography
- Gustavo Sazes – cover art, layout
- Stefan Heilemann – additional artwork
- Ashley Oomen – photography

== Charts ==
Chart performance for I Am the Empire – Live from the 013
Chart (2020)	Peak position
Belgian Albums (Ultratop Flanders)	137
Belgian Albums (Ultratop Wallonia)	51
Dutch Albums (Album Top 100)	29
German Albums (Offizielle Top 100)	17
Hungarian Albums (MAHASZ)	23
Swiss Albums (Schweizer Hitparade)	22
