= Dommin E.P. =

EP by Dommin
- Released: 2009
- Genre: Gothic rock
- Length: 16:05
- Label: Roadrunner
- Producer: Lucas Banker; Logan Mader

Dommin chronology
Mend Your Misery (2006)	Dommin E.P. (2009)	Love Is Gone (2010)

Dommin E.P. is an extended play released by American rock band, Dommin, promoting their album, Love Is Gone, which was released seven months later. The album was released exclusively through Hot Topic and ShockHound.com. The tracks "My Heart, Your Hands," "Dark Holiday," and "Without End" also appear on Love Is Gone. "Awake" is a b-side from the album.

== Track listing ==
No.	Title	Length
1.	"My Heart, Your Hands"	4:32
2.	"Dark Holiday"	3:17
3.	"Without End"	4:03
4.	"Awake"	4:54
