= As Shadows Burn =

Studio album by Echoes of Eternity
- Released: September 22nd, 2009 (USA); September 25th, 2009 (Europe)
- Genre: Progressive metal Thrash metal Gothic metal
- Length: 39:58
- Label: Nuclear Blast (USA); Massacre Records (Europe)
- Producer: Logan Mader

Echoes of Eternity chronology
The Forgotten Goddess (2007)	As Shadows Burn (2009)

Professional ratings
Review scores
Source	Rating
Allmusic	3/5 stars

As Shadows Burn is the 2nd studio album by the band Echoes of Eternity, released by Nuclear Blast on September 22, 2009 in the US and by Massacre Records on September 25, 2009 in Europe.

== Track listing ==
1. "Ten of Swords" - 3:55
2. "A Veiled Horizon" (Duane Cowan) - 3:34
3. "Memories of Blood and Gold" - 3:46
4. "The Scarlet Embrace" (Brandon Patton) - 5:18
5. "Descent of a Blackened Soul" - 4:10
6. "Twilight Fires" - 4:08
7. "Buried Beneath a Thousand Dreams" (Brandon Patton) - 4:19
8. "Letalis Deus" - 3:33
9. "Funeral in the Sky" (Brandon Patton, Duane Cowan, Bryan Eagle, Kirk Carrison, Cliff Carrison/Instrumental) - 7:12
- All songs written by Francine Boucher except where noted

== Personnel ==
- Francine Boucher - Vocals
- Brandon Patton - Guitars
- Bryan Eagle - Guitars
- Duane Cowan - Bass
- Kirk Carrison - Drums
