= Divine Heresy =

American metal band

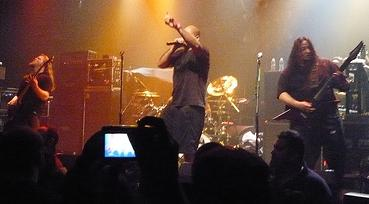
- Divine Heresy in November 2007

Background information
- Origin: Los Angeles, California, U.S.
- Genres: Metalcore; technical death metal; groove metal
- Years active: 2006–2015; 2022–present
- Labels: Century Media; Roadrunner
- Members: Dino Cazares; Lauren Hart; Gabe Seeber
- Past members: John Sankey; Tim Yeung; Tommy Vext; Joe Payne; Travis Neal
- Website: Divine Heresy on Myspace

Divine Heresy is an American heavy metal band formed in Los Angeles, California by founder of Fear Factory guitarist Dino Cazares and Devolved drummer John Sankey. Although the band originated in 2002, Divine Heresy was officially formed in 2006. The band currently consists of guitarist Cazares, drummer Gabe Seeber and vocalist Lauren Hart. Tommy "Vext" Cummings was fired following an onstage altercation on April 26, 2008. After auditioning for a new frontman, it was announced on August 14 that The Bereaved vocalist Travis Neal would fill the position.

The band's debut album, Bleed the Fifth, was released on August 28, 2007, and sold 2,700 copies in its first week. It received generally positive reviews. Eduardo Rivadavia of AllMusic commented the album "strikes a near-perfect balance between confirmation and innovation", while Dom Lawson of Metal Hammer commented "All in all, the portly pioneer [Cazares] has hit the bull's-eye".

== History ==
=== Formation (2002–2007) ===
Following his departure from Fear Factory in 2002, guitarist Dino Cazares was looking for a drummer. He tried John Sankey of Devolved and Nick Barker of Cradle of Filth and Dimmu Borgir. Both had to return to Australia and England, respectively, due to visa issues. He met former Vital Remains drummer Tim Yeung. Cazares and Yeung recorded the material they wrote and sent tapes to Cummings for his vocal audition. Cazares commented, "We heard passion and anger in his voice, which was something we wanted. It was also very aggressive." Divine Heresy held auditions for a permanent bassist. Tony Campos of Static-X played bass on three songs and Cazares on the remaining songs. Following unsuccessful auditions, former Nile bassist Joe Payne contacted Cazares. Cazares knew Payne from seeing him play live with Nile. After auditioning, Payne joined Divine Heresy as the permanent bass guitarist.

=== Bleed the Fifth (2007–2008) ===
The band recorded its debut album, Bleed the Fifth, in early 2007, produced by former Machine Head guitarist Logan Mader. The title of the album is a play on words. Cazares said, "You have the right to keep your mouth shut, but on this record we believe we're saying a lot". Cummings wrote most of the lyrics, which deal with overcoming personal strife. Much of the lyrics were influenced by the Book of Revelation, natural disasters, war, and terrorism. Cazares stated the album is a "big fuck you" to the people who want his projects to fail.

Released on August 28, 2007, in the United States, Bleed the Fifth sold 2,700 copies in its first week. Dom Lawson of Metal Hammer said, "All in all, the portly pioneer has hit the bull's-eye and it's going to be fascinating to see what happens next", awarding an 8 out of a possible 10. Eduardo Rivadavia of Allmusic felt the album "strikes a near-perfect balance between confirmation (reminding fans of Cazares' abilities and unique vision) and innovation (he even plays a few guitar solos!)". Scott Alisoglu of Blabbermouth.net claimed the album is "one tough son of a bitch that may still have you humming melodies long after you've ejected the disc." Chad Bowar of About.com commented, "Great musicianship, good songs and excellent production make this a very respectable debut."

After recording was completed, Cazares announced the band signed a North American deal with Century Media Records, and a licensing deal with Roadrunner Records in Europe. He chose Century Media based on the creative freedom the label gave him, whereas Roadrunner would ask him to produce radio and commercial songs when he was in Fear Factory. Yeung claims Roadrunner were not interested and said he did not want to be on a label that is "sort of interested".

=== Departure of Tommy Vext (2008) ===
Lead singer Tommy Vext left the band following an on-stage altercation on April 26, 2008. The cause of the altercation remains controversial. According to Dino Cazares, Vext was fired because of a conflict during a live show. "We felt that he wanted to end the show early to go hang out at the New England Metal Fest, which we were supposed to be performing at the next day" coming up with all sorts of excuses to make this happen. The band continued to play after what Vext said was supposed to be the last song. Vext then began screaming at Dino and argued with him before he pushed Dino across the stage. Vext was kicked out of the band immediately. In a video interview Vext explained that he wanted to prevent ruining his voice for the next show by ending the set early because the PA system went out during the show.

In exclusive "Metal Injection" interview Tommy explained his departure from the band:

I've been suffering the indignities of Dino's massive ego for as long as I've worked with him, and unfortunately, everything I've heard about him had eventually come to fruition, and he is exactly as he's been portrayed as by his ex-band members. And this happening now is the same reason why he's not in Fear Factory anymore. It was a stepping stone in my life and I'm moving on.

— Tommy Vext

=== Bringer of Plagues and hiatus (2009–2015) ===
Divine Heresy's follow-up to 2007's Bleed the Fifth was their first release with new vocalist Travis Neal, formerly of Pushed. He is also a member of Swedish band The Bereaved and the band Hate Times Nine from San Diego/LA. The album, Bringer of Plagues, was released on July 28 release via Century Media Records. Cazares co-produced the album with producing team Dirty Icon (Logan Mader and Lucas Banker).

As of November 25, 2010, Divine Heresy could not be found on the Century Media Records website. Cazares said in interviews that during breaks from touring, he and Yeung were writing new material for the next Divine Heresy record. On January 26, 2011, it was announced that bassist Joe Payne had left Divine Heresy. In late 2012, Payne and an associate were arrested in connection with an investigation into the distribution of more than 2,900 grams (6.4 pounds) of marijuana.

On May 10, 2011, Cazares announced via Divine Heresy's Facebook page and through his own personal account that Divine Heresy were still together and that there would be a new album in 2012. He said that they were planning a tour along the US east coast. On August 17, 2012, Cazares tweeted on the status of Tim Yeung as a DH drummer:

Well judging from his drumming on the last MA cd not sure if I want him back. I'll try but he's David V's boy now. Might be too difficult plus there are plenty of other sick drummers out there.

On July 27, 2015, in an interview with MetalSucks, Cazares confirmed that he was the only remaining member of Divine Heresy and the band was inactive due to his commitments with Fear Factory.

On January 24, 2020, Cazares, announced that Payne had died at the age of 35. No cause of death was disclosed.

=== Return from hiatus and new lineup (2022–present) ===
On August 1, 2022, Cazares announced he had recruited Lauren Hart of Once Human as the band's new vocalist. He revealed he had begun writing new material and would play all the guitars and bass on the recordings. Over a month later, Cazares announced that Gabe Seeber, live drummer of Decrepit Birth, was the band's new drummer.

== Band members ==
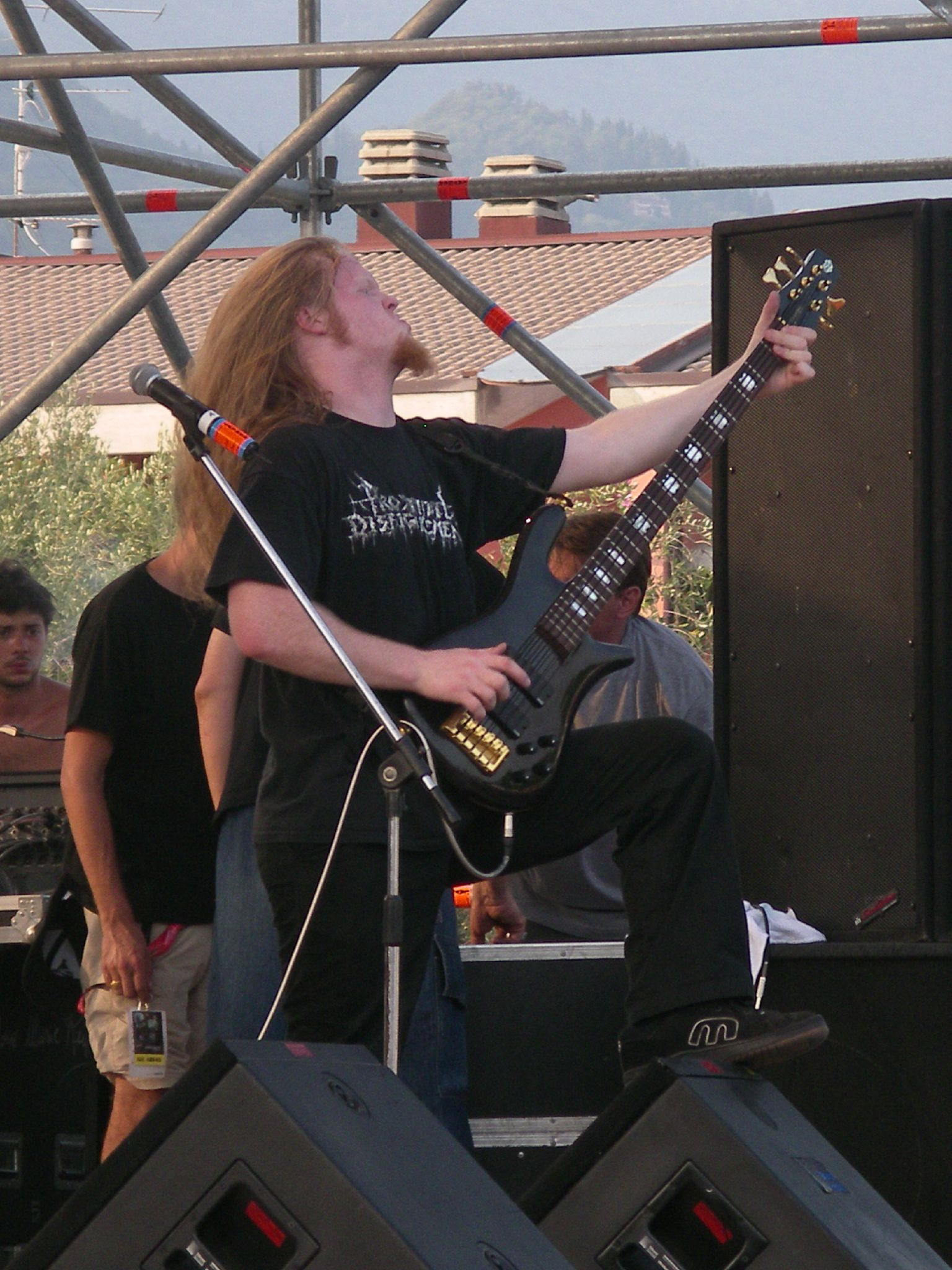
Joe Payne in 2006

=== Current ===
- Dino Cazares – guitars (2005–present), bass (2005–2007, 2022–present)
- Lauren Hart – vocals (2022–present)
- Gabe Seeber – drums (2022–present)

=== Former ===
- Jose Maldanado – vocals (2005)
- John Sankey – drums (2005)
- Tim Yeung – drums (2006–2012)
- Tommy Vext – vocals (2006–2008)
- Joe Payne – bass, backing vocals (2007–2011; died 2020)
- Travis Neal – vocals (2008–2013)

=== Live ===
- Risha Eryavec – bass (2006–2007)
- Jake Veredika – vocals (2008)

== Discography ==
Studio albums

- Bleed the Fifth (2007)
- Bringer of Plagues (2009)

Music videos

- "Failed Creation" – 2007
- "Bleed the Fifth (Tommy Vext Version)" – 2007
- "Bleed the Fifth (Travis Neal Version)" – 2008
- "Facebreaker" – 2009
