= Bleed the Fifth =

- Cover art by Joachim Luetke

Studio album by Divine Heresy
- Released: August 25, 2007
- Recorded: February–June 2007
- Genres: Metalcore; groove metal; technical death metal
- Length: 38:49
- Labels: Century Media (US); Roadrunner (worldwide)
- Producer: Logan Mader

Divine Heresy chronology
Bleed the Fifth (2007)	Bringer of Plagues (2009)

Singles from Bleed the Fifth
- 1. "Failed Creation" Released: 2007; 2. "Savior Self" Released: 2007; 3. "Bleed the Fifth" Released: 2008

Back cover

Professional ratings
Review scores
Source	Rating
About.com	3.5/5 stars
AllMusic	3.5/5 stars
Blabbermouth.net	8/10 stars
Live-Metal.net	7.5/10 stars
Sea of Tranquility	3.5/5 stars
Sputnikmusic	3.2/5

Bleed the Fifth is the debut studio album by American metal band Divine Heresy, released in August 2007. It sold approximately 2,700 copies in its first week of release. The album name is a play on the American judicial system Fifth Amendment (to plead the Fifth Amendment). It is the only album to feature original vocalist Tommy Vext who later departed from the band after an on-stage altercation.

"Failed Creation" served as the album's lead single. Its music video received airplay on MTV2's Headbangers Ball upon release.

The title of the album is a play on the phrase "plead the fifth".

== Track listing ==
All lyrics written by Tommy Vext.

No.	Title	Music	Length
1.	"Bleed the Fifth"	Dino Cazares; Tim Yeung	3:06
2.	"Failed Creation"	Cazares; Yeung	3:37
3.	"This Threat Is Real"	Cazares; Nick Barker	4:23
4.	"Impossible Is Nothing"	Cazares; Yeung	3:56
5.	"Savior Self"	Cazares; Barker	3:18
6.	"Rise of the Scorned" (featuring Tony Campos, Nick Barker, Logan Mader and Marc Rizzo)	Cazares; Barker	4:55
7.	"False Gospel"	Cazares; Yeung	3:20
8.	"Soul Decoded (Now and Forever)"	Cazares; Yeung	4:02
9.	"Royal Blood Heresy" (featuring Logan Mader)	Cazares; Yeung	4:43
10.	"Closure" (featuring Tony Campos and Logan Mader)	Cazares; Yeung	3:34

Japanese edition bonus tracks
No.	Title	Music	Length
11.	"Purity Defiled"	Cazares; Yeung	3:31
12.	"Parasite Drama"	Cazares; Yeung	3:26

== Credits ==
Divine Heresy

- Tommy Vext – vocals
- Dino Cazares – guitars, bass
- Tim Yeung – drums

Guest musicians

- Tony Campos – bass on "Rise of the Scorned" and "Closure"
- Logan Mader – additional guitars on "Rise of the Scorned", "Royal Blood Heresy", and "Closure"
- Marc Rizzo – acoustic guitars on "Rise of the Scorned"

Production

- Logan Mader – producer, mixing, engineering, mastering
- Mike Rashmawi – digital editing
- Monte Conner – A&R

== Release history ==
Country	Release date
Australia	August 25, 2007
United Kingdom	August 27, 2007
United States	August 28, 2007
