= The Forgotten Goddess =

Studio album by Echoes of Eternity
- Released: February 2, 2007 (Europe); February 20, 2007 (USA)
- Recorded: Raven's Work studios
- Studio: qlter recordes studio
- Genre: Progressive metal Thrash metal Gothic metal
- Length: 42:28
- Label: Nuclear Blast
- Producer: Eric Ryan

Echoes of Eternity chronology
| The Forgotten Goddess (2007) | As Shadows Burn (2009) |

The Forgotten Goddess is the debut album by the band Echoes of Eternity, released by Nuclear Blast records on February 2, 2007, in Europe and February 20, 2007, in the USA. It was produced by Eric Ryan, and recorded at Raven's Work studios in Venice, California.

Professional ratings
Review scores
| Source | Rating |
|---|---|
| Allmusic | link |

== Track list ==
1. Burning with Life – 1:34
2. Expressions of Flesh – 4:12
3. Garden of the Gods – 4:52
4. Towers of Silence – 4:21
5. Voices in a Dream – 4:47
6. The Forgotten Goddess – 4:48
7. The Kingdom Within – 6:16
8. Lost Beneath a Silent Sky – 4:28
9. Circles in Stone – 4:56
10. Adrift – 2:14
- All songs composed and arranged by Brandon Patton, Kirk Carrison, Francine Boucher and Duane Cowan
- Lyrics by Brandon Patton and Francine Boucher

== Personnel ==
- Francine Boucher – vocals
- Brandon Patton – guitars
- Duane Cowan – bass
- Kirk Carrison – drums

== Additional personnel ==
- Elizabeth Wright – cello (The Kingdom Within, Adrift)
- Robert Anderson – violin (The Kingdom Within, Adrift)
