= Tim Yeung =

American extreme metal drummer (born 1978)

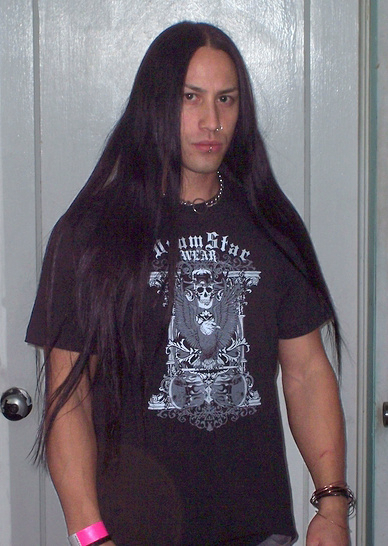
- Yeung in 2005

Background information
- Also known as: "The Missile"
- Born: November 27, 1978 (age 47); Rochester, New York, U.S.
- Genres: Death metal; metalcore; heavy metal; extreme metal
- Occupation: Drummer
- Years active: 1997–present
- Member of: As I Lay Dying
- Formerly of: Divine Heresy; Hate Eternal; Morbid Angel; Vital Remains; World Under Blood; Decrepit Birth; Nile
- Website: timyeung.com

Tim Yeung (born November 27, 1978) is an American extreme metal drummer. He has played with bands such as Hate Eternal, All That Remains, As I Lay Dying and Vital Remains.

== Biography ==
Yeung attended Hochstein School of Music & Dance in Rochester, New York and graduated in 1995. He was first introduced to the death metal genre in the 1980s. His breakout performance was in 1999 on Hate Eternal's debut album Conquering the Throne, after which he became a big name in the death metal scene. Although Yeung left Hate Eternal after the release of Conquering the Throne, he started lending his talents as a live session drummer, such as with American metalcore band All That Remains, death metal bands Vital Remains and Nile, and as a studio drummer on ...And Time Begins by Decrepit Birth.

Yeung was the drummer and co-founder of the death metal/metalcore band Divine Heresy and can be heard on their debut album, Bleed the Fifth and their second studio album, Bringer of Plagues. He was also the drummer of World Under Blood, CKY frontman Deron Miller's death metal side project. He replaced Pete Sandoval in Morbid Angel for their 2011 album Illud Divinum Insanus due to Sandoval's back surgery and was their official drummer until June 2015.

In a Metal Addicts interview Yeung commented on his reasons for leaving Morbid Angel: “I’ve been waiting to break the news for a while about this. Now seems like the proper time to do so. As some of you know, there have been some lineup changes with Morbid Angel. Unfortunately, due to financial differences, I will not be continuing with them. It has been a great five years being involved with Morbid Angel. I’ve met a ton of great people all over the world, played some amazing shows, and have a ton of great memories as well as stories. I wish Trey (Azagthoth) and Morbid Angel all the best. As for myself, I’m always up for the next opportunity life throws my way.”

In 2006, Yeung hit 872 bass drum hits in one minute at a World's Fastest Drummer competition, which earned him the Fastest Feet Title for that event, though not the world record, which clocked in at 1034 hits in one minute, held by Canadian drummer Mike Mallais. By Yeung's standards, 872 hits in a minute is comparatively low, translating to one minute of 16th notes at 218 BPM, which is considerably slower than the speeds he has displayed in his group work, which he has been said to get to speeds of around just over 247 BPM. Yeung has stated in interviews that he could have played much faster if he had been using his own setup.

On October 8, 2025, As I Lay Dying announced that Yeung had joined the band.

== Equipment ==
Yeung uses and endorses ddrum drums, Sabian cymbals, Axis pedals and Vater drumsticks

Setup

- Drums – ddrum Dominion Maple, Black Gloss finish
  - 22×20 Bass Drum (×2)
  - 10×7 Tom
  - 12×8 Tom
  - 13×9 Tom
  - 14×13 Tom
  - 16×14 Floor Tom
  - 14×6.5 Tim Yeung Signature Detonator Snare Drum
- Cymbals – Sabian
  - 14" AAX Metal Hi-Hats
  - 14" AA Mini Chinese
  - 18" B8 Pro Chinese
  - 18" AAX Stage Crash
  - 8" AAX Splash
  - 18" AAX Studio Crash
  - 19" AAX X-Treme Chinese
  - 22" HH Power Bell Ride
  - 12" AA Mini Hat stacked on a 14" AAX Mini Chinese
  - 20" APX Crash
- Hardware
  - Axis Longboards A Classic Black Pedals (×2)
- Other
  - [Vater] XD-5B Nylon Tip Drumsticks
