= All Out War (album) =

Studio album by Incite
- Released: November 20, 2012
- Recorded: Phoenix, Arizona, US
- Genre: Groove metal, thrash metal
- Length: 42:51
- Label: minus HEAD
- Producer: Logan Mader

Incite chronology
The Slaughter (2009)	All Out War (2012)	Up in Hell (2014)

Singles from All Out War
- 1. "Die Alone" Released: November 15, 2012; 2. "Hopeless" Released: November 29, 2012

Professional ratings
Review scores
Source	Rating
Revolver	3/5 stars
Metal Hammer	7/10 stars
Terrorizer	3/5 stars
The New Review	4.5/5 stars
Cack Blabbath	(Positive)
Rock Revolt Magazine	5/5 stars

All Out War is the second album by American groove metal band Incite, released on November 20, 2012, on Minus Head Records. The album was produced by Logan Mader in Phoenix and has been supported by the Maximum Cavalera Tour, supporting Soulfly along with Lody Kong. The album has received positive reviews from critics.

== Track listing ==
No.	Title	Length
1.	"The Aftermath"	3:33
2.	"4ever Loko"	4:47
3.	"Feel the Flames"	3:33
4.	"Hopeless"	4:42
5.	"Retaliation"	4:25
6.	"Exposed"	2:49
7.	"Nothing Remains"	5:02
8.	"Die Alone"	4:59
9.	"Consequences of Life"	4:58
10.	"Departure"	3:59
Total length:		42:51

== Credits ==
=== Personnel ===
- Richie Cavalera – vocals
- Kevin "Dis" McAllister - guitars
- Luis Marrufo – bass guitar
- Zak Solafy – drums

=== Production ===
- Logan Mader – mixing, mastering
