= The Life I Remember =

Studio album by Once Human
- Released: September 4, 2015
- Recorded: 2015
- Genre: Melodic death metal, groove metal
- Length: 40:48
- Label: earMUSIC
- Producer: Logan Mader

Once Human chronology
The Life I Remember (2015)	Evolution (2017)

The Life I Remember is the debut studio album by American heavy metal band Once Human. It was released on September 4, 2015, through earMUSIC.

== Background ==
In 2014, after taking more than ten years off from performing live music, music producer and former Soulfly/Machine Head guitarist Logan Mader founded the band now known as Once Human.

On May 26, 2015, the ensemble published a lyric video of "The Life I Remember", the title track for the album. An equivalent video of "Terminal" was unleashed on July 10, 2015. Four weeks later, the group released "You Cunt", the first video from the ensemble portraying them playing alongside a theatrical plot.

== Touring ==
The band toured Europe in November and December 2015 with American industrial metal band Fear Factory.

== Critical reception ==
ArtistDirect indicated that title track "The Life I Remember" is "full of the crunch and grit that metal fans have come to love and expect from [Mader], who pounded out riffs in some essential, '90s-era metal bands".

Blabbermouth.net portrays Hart's singing as a "throat-scarring level of vocal brutality that completely contradicts her soft appearance".

According to Jeremy Borjon of Revolver magazine the band demonstrates "an impeccably produced, ruthless and mature sound in the vein of Arch Enemy and DevilDriver" with Hart bringing "the metal with clear and compelling screaming fleshed out by a groovy and thunderous rhythm section".

== Track listing ==
No.	Title	Length
1.	"Trail of Tears"	1:20
2.	"Ground Zero"	5:12
3.	"You Cunt"	3:04
4.	"Pick Your Poison"	3:46
5.	"Terminal"	3:11
6.	"Demoneyes"	4:16
7.	"Devil Can Have You"	3:27
8.	"Time of the Disease"	4:31
9.	"I Am War"	1:51
10.	"The Life I Remember"	3:43
11.	"Siren"	1:37
12.	"Growing Colder"	4:50
Total length:		40:48

== Personnel ==
Musicians

- Lauren Hart – vocals, rhythm guitar, piano
- Logan Mader – lead guitar
- Damien Rainaud – bass
- Ralph Alexander – drums

Additional personnel

- Logan Mader – composition, engineering, production
- Damien Rainaud – composition, engineering
- Lauren Hart – composition
- Seth Siro Anton – artwork
- Maor Appelbaum – remastering
- Josh Franks – assistant engineering
- Tina Guo – cello
- Bill Hudson – additional guitars
- Nathan Mader – photography
- Gerard Marino – sound design
- Alexander Mertsch – layout

== Videos ==
- "The Life I Remember" (2015)
- "Terminal" (2015)
- "You Cunt" (2015)
