= Evolution (Once Human album) =

Studio album by Once Human
- Released: February 17, 2017
- Genres: Groove metal, melodic death metal
- Length: 44:24; 49:22 (Japanese edition)
- Labels: earMUSIC, eOne Music
- Producer: Logan Mader

Once Human chronology
The Life I Remember (2015)	Evolution (2017)	Scar Weaver (2022)

Professional ratings
Review scores
Source	Rating
Cutting Edge	4/5 stars
Loud Magazine Australia	50/100
Metal Hammer	3/5 stars
Powermetal.de	6.5/10
Rock Hard	7.5/10
Soundi	2/5 stars

Evolution is the second studio album by American heavy metal band Once Human. It was released on February 17, 2017 through earMUSIC. On September 13, 2016, the band released the music video for "Eye of Chaos".

== Track listing ==
No.	Title	Length
1.	"Flock of Flesh"	4:50
2.	"Eye of Chaos"	4:49
3.	"Mass Murder Frenzy"	4:19
4.	"Gravity"	4:52
5.	"Dark Matter"	4:24
6.	"Paragon"	5:16
7.	"Drain"	5:54
8.	"Killers for the Cure"	4:47
9.	"Passenger"	5:13
Total length:		44:24

Japanese edition bonus track
No.	Title	Length
10.	"Davidian" (Machine Head cover)	4:58
Total length:		49:22

== Credits ==
- Lauren Hart - vocals
- Logan Mader - lead guitar
- Max Karon - rhythm guitar
- Damian Rainaud - bass
- Dillon Trollope - drums

Production

- Logan Mader - production, engineering, mixing
- Max Karon - engineering
- Seth Anton - artwork
- Jens Borgan - mastering
- Alex Martsch - layout
- Richard Marz - photography

Additional musicians

- Skyler Howren - additional guitars
