= Lauren Hart (heavy metal musician) =

American musician

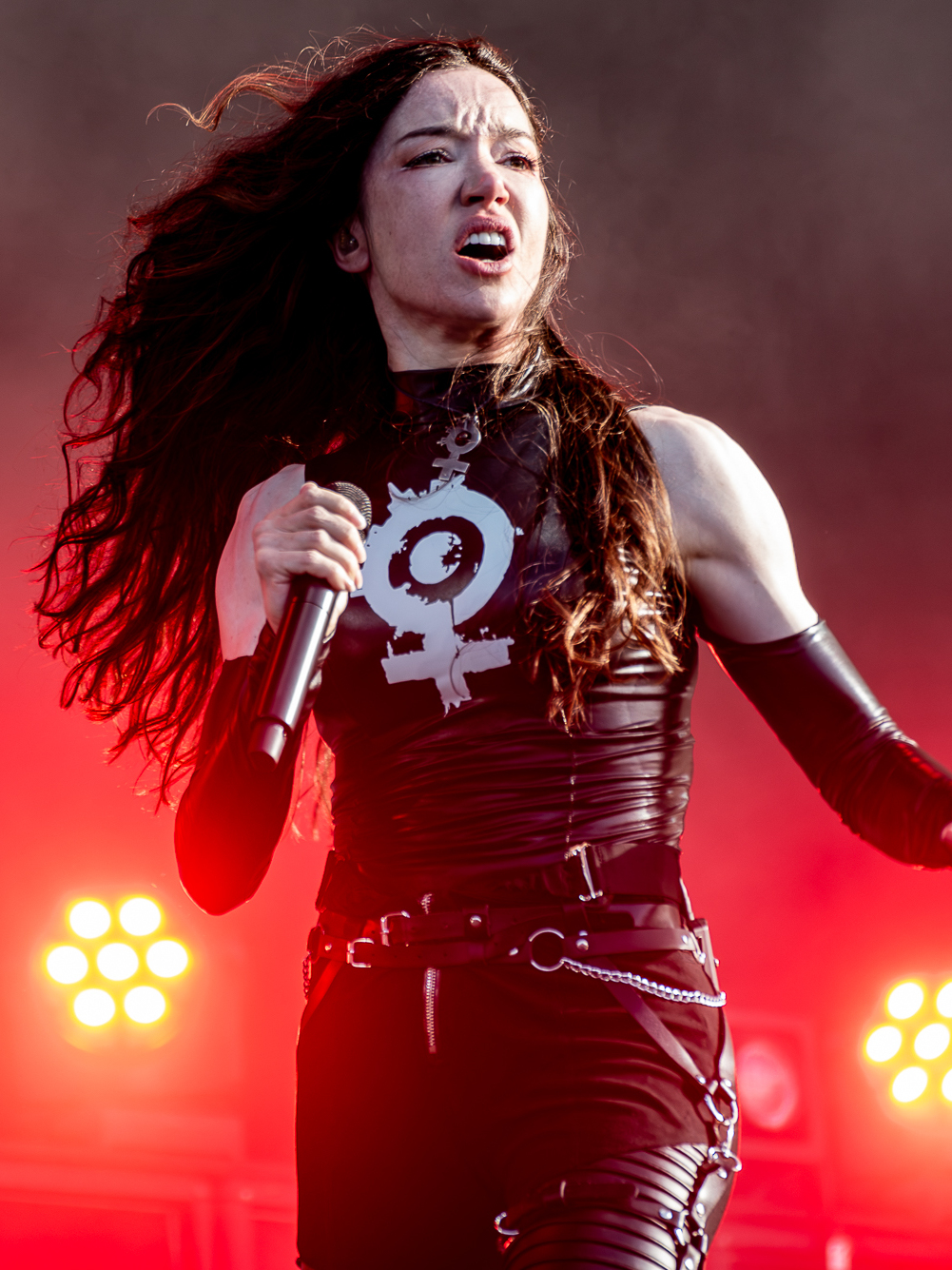
- Hart performing with Arch Enemy in 2026

Background information
- Born: 8 April 1986 (age 40); Anaheim, California, U.S.
- Genres: Melodic death metal; groove metal; metalcore
- Occupations: Singer, songwriter
- Instruments: Vocals, guitar, piano
- Years active: 2014–present
- Labels: earMUSIC; Century Media
- Member of: Once Human; Divine Heresy; Arch Enemy

Lauren Hart (born 8 April 1986) is an American heavy metal musician, best known as the lead vocalist and rhythm guitarist of the American melodic death metal/groove metal band Once Human, and current lead vocalist of the Swedish melodic death metal band Arch Enemy. American heavy metal band Divine Heresy recruited Hart as their vocalist in 2022. Hart's vocal style includes a mixture of growling and clean singing. Hart has appeared on multiple occasions as a guest vocalist for power metal band Kamelot both on stage and in the studio for their 2018 studio album The Shadow Theory.

== Early life ==
Hart was born in Anaheim, California, USA, but was raised in Australia. Shortly before being put in contact with Logan Mader and kickstarting her professional music career, Hart relocated to Los Angeles.

== Career ==
=== Once Human (2014–2022) ===
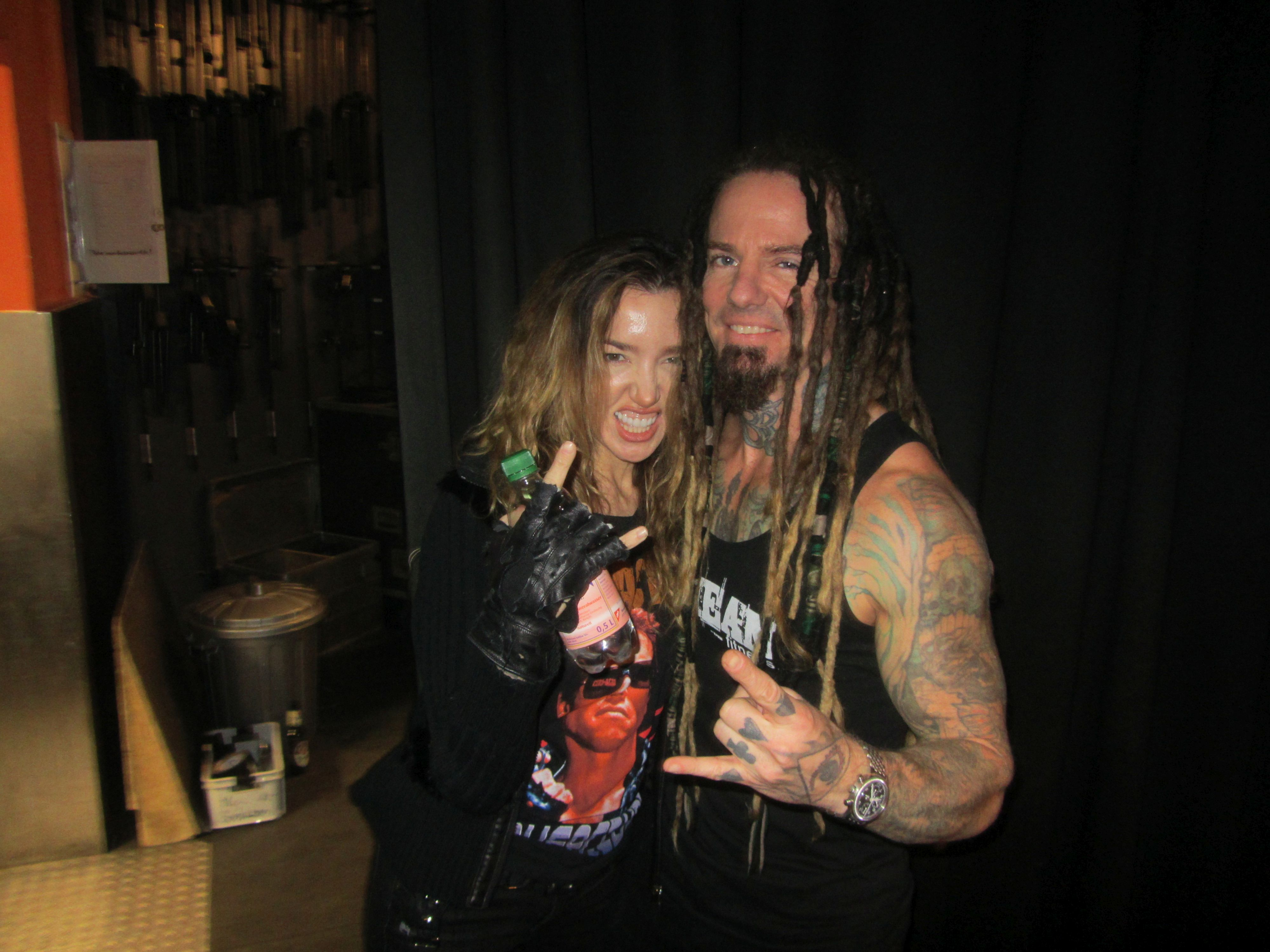
Hart with Logan Mader in 2015

In 2014, music executive and A&R representative Monte Conner discovered Hart via clips uploaded to social media of her performing guitar riffs, and contacted Machine Head guitarist Logan Mader to inquire about a record deal for Hart. This led to the formation of the band Once Human. The band released three studio albums and one live album between 2015 and 2022. Following the release of Scar Weaver, the band became inactive.

=== Divine Heresy (2022–present) ===
On 1 August 2022, Dino Cazares (best known as the guitarist of Fear Factory) announced via Facebook that he was working on new Divine Heresy music with Hart, writing "I'm almost ready to write some new material w/ singer Lauren Hart".

=== Arch Enemy (2026–present) ===
On 19 February 2026, alongside the release of their single "To the Last Breath", Arch Enemy announced Hart as the new vocalist of the band, following the departure of Alissa White-Gluz a few months earlier. "Connecting with Lauren has marked an important step in my journey," says Arch Enemy guitarist and band leader Michael Amott, commenting on the announcement. "Working with her was an exceptional experience - her remarkable voice, coupled with her dedication and professionalism, brings a rare level of excellence. I look forward to continuing the collaboration!" Hart performed her first show with the band in Beijing, China on 27 March 2026.

== Discography ==
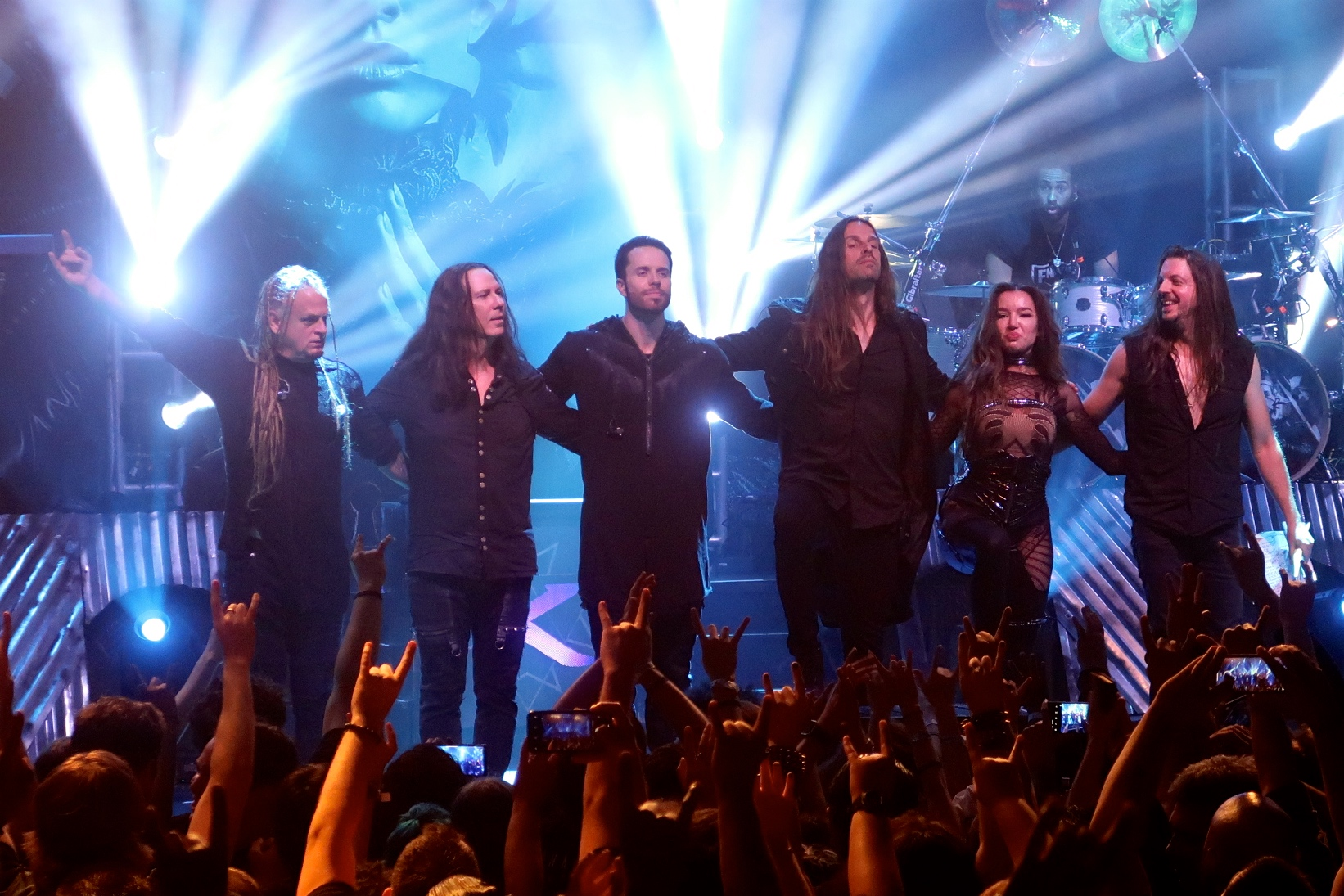
Hart on stage with Kamelot in 2019

=== Once Human ===
Studio albums:

- 2015 – The Life I Remember
- 2017 – Evolution
- 2022 – Scar Weaver

Live albums:

- 2018 – Stage of Evolution

=== Arch Enemy ===
- 2026 – "To the Last Breath" (single)

=== Guest appearances ===
- 2018 – The Shadow Theory (tracks 2, 9, 12) – Kamelot
- 2018 – Repulsion for Humanity (track 7) – Sinsaenum
- 2020 – I Am the Empire – Live from the 013 (track 2) – Kamelot
- 2024 – Warp Speed Warriors (backing vocals) – DragonForce
