= Echoes of Eternity =

American progressive metal band

- Origin: Los Angeles, California, U.S.
- Genres: Progressive metal, thrash metal, gothic metal
- Years active: 2005–2013, 2015–present
- Labels: Nuclear Blast, Massacre
- Members: Francine Boucher; Brandon Patton; Kirk Carrison; Sam Young
- Past members: James Urias; Bryan Eagle; Duane Cowan

Echoes of Eternity is an American progressive metal band based in Los Angeles, California, United States. Their debut album The Forgotten Goddess, was released in February 2007 on Nuclear Blast records. The band's follow up album, As Shadows Burn, was released on September 25, 2009 via Massacre Records in Europe and on September 22, 2009 via Nuclear Blast in the U.S.

== History ==
Echoes of Eternity was founded in 2005 by South Carolina natives Kirk Carrison and Brandon Patton. Carrison met vocalist Francine Boucher while attending Full Sail recording school in Florida. The two began dating and moved to Los Angeles together following their graduation in 2001 to seek work in recording studios. After a few failed music projects, Carrison urged longtime friend and guitarist Patton to move to Los Angeles and form a band. The two enlisted Canadian-born Francine on vocals, who had previously created and recorded her own work with the intention of scoring films. The band then added bassist Duane Cowan, who had recently relocated from Japan to Los Angeles.

The group recorded a three-song demo, which was sent out to producers and labels, and eventually found its way to noted producer and guitarist Roy Z, who expressed interest in the band. Z initially wanted to produce the band, but was busy with other projects, and passed the demo along to Nuclear Blast records, who signed the band in 2006.

The band entered Raven's Work studio in June 2006 to begin work on their debut release. Guitarist James Urias of Lubbock, TX, and good friend of Patton, was brought in to assist in writing and recording of the album. Carrison, who was an assistant engineer at Raven's Work, was afforded studio time at night and on the weekends to record, although the studio is primarily used for television commercial audio post production. Produced by Raven's Work engineer Eric Ryan, the resulting album blended elements of American thrash metal with European style female-fronted gothic metal.

On February 20, 2007, Echoes of Eternity released their debut album The Forgotten Goddess on Nuclear Blast Records. Press response to the album was mixed, with Brave Words & Bloody Knuckles' Martin Popoff stating that he was "not thrilled with the high-strung, ProTooled, synthetic, stiff nature of the riffs and the drumming", while Jeff Maki of Live-Metal.net said the album features "beautiful melodies galore, backed by a start-stop machine gun double bass attack and a classic metal guitar sound."

Echoes of Eternity added second guitarist Sam Young in 2007, and filmed a video for the song "Voices in a Dream" with director Ole Carlson. In June 2007, the band embarked on a US tour opening for Symphony X and Sanctity, in the fall they toured with Edguy, Into Eternity, and Light This City and later toured with Trail of Tears and Unexpect.

In late 2008, the band separated with guitarist Sam Young and brought in long-time friend Bryan Eagle. Eagle has done numerous projects with both Carrison and Cowan in the past including a demo with his project Scream In Agony with guitarist Nick Meehan.

Echoes of Eternity completed the recording of their second album, As Shadows Burn, with producer Logan Mader in January 2009. In July 2009, the band announced signing with the German underground label Massacre Records for European distribution. As Shadows Burn was released in Europe on September 25, 2009, with an American release by Nuclear Blast on September 22.

As of August 2013, Echoes of Eternity has reported that the band is on permanent hiatus. Guitarist Brandon Patton posted the following on the band's official Facebook Page:"Echoes of Eternity is on what may be a permanent hiatus. Don't hold your breath for any new music from us. For those of you who are interested, I am working on a demo for a new project I've started. It is similar to Echoes of Eternity but with a male singer. I'll keep you posted as we progress. Thanks for all the past support of EoE. Brandon".

In August 2015, exactly two years after the official disbandment, they started posting on their Facebook page about a Kickstarter project for a new EP.

On September 5, 2015, 16 days before the funding for the new EP was complete, they cancelled the project and deleted everything that they had posted on Facebook since the supposed comeback. There has been no explanation as to why. On March 29, 2016, they started posting on Facebook again about a new album they're working on, called "Ageless", that is to be released later in 2016. They still have not addressed the Kickstarter issue.

After 2.5 years and few updates, they posted on Facebook that the album will be released on February 5, 2019, ten years after their latest output. And this time, the band lived up to their promise and released "Ageless".

== Lineup ==
Current

- Francine Boucher – vocals (2005–2013, 2015–present)
- Brandon Patton – lead guitars (2005–2013, 2015–present)
- Sam Young – rhythm guitars (2007–2008, 2015–present)
- Kirk Carrison – drums (2005–2013, 2015–present)

Session members

- Michael Canales – bass (2015–present)

Former members

- James Urias – rhythm guitars (2006–2007)
- Bryan Eagle – rhythm guitars (2008–2013)
- Duane Cowan – bass (2005–2013)

== Discography ==
- The Forgotten Goddess – 2007
- As Shadows Burn – 2009
- Ageless – 2019
