= Once Human (band) =

American metal band

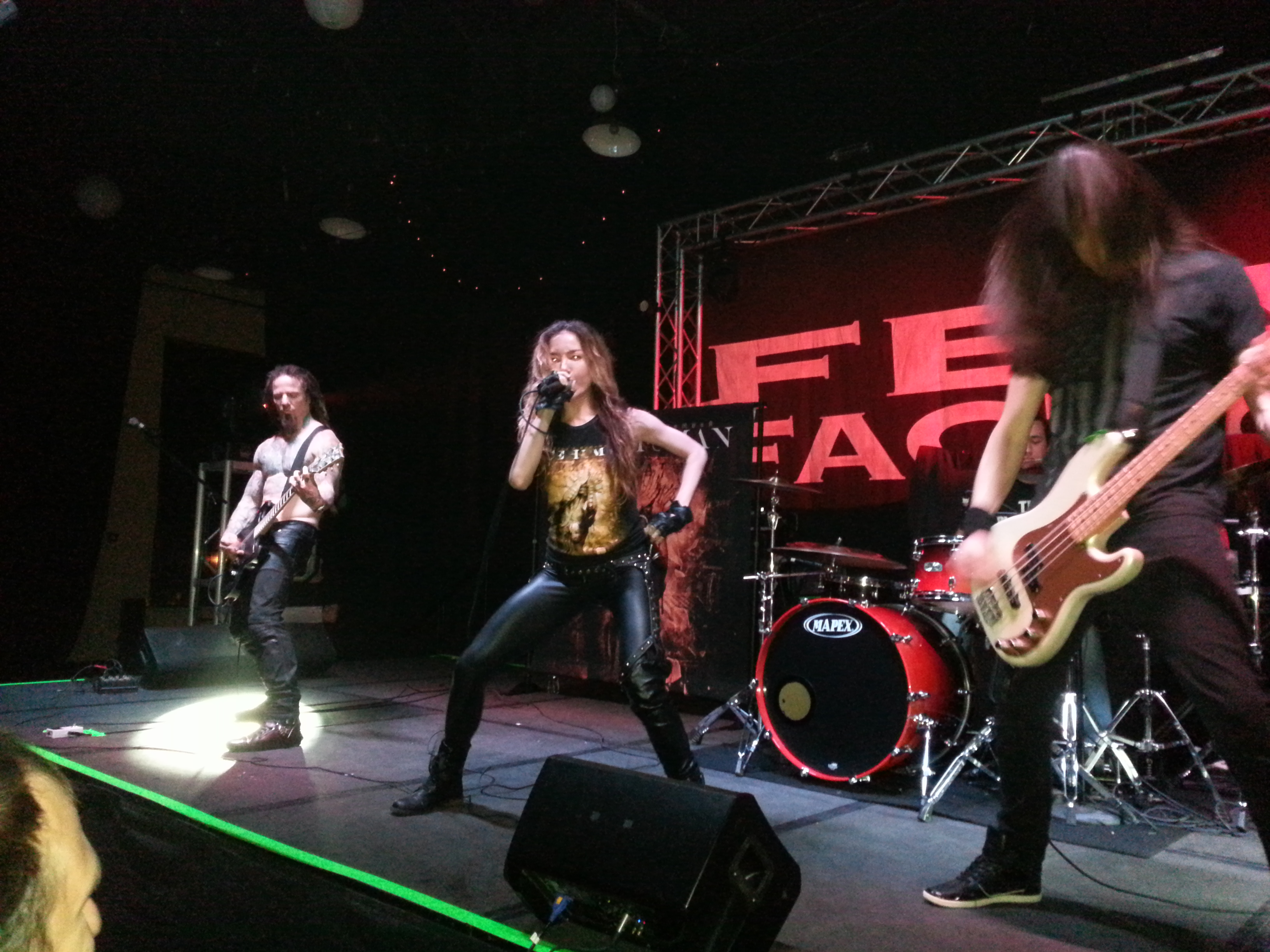
- Once Human performing in 2015

Background information
- Origin: Los Angeles, California, U.S.
- Genres: Melodic death metal, groove metal
- Years active: 2014–present
- Label: earMUSIC
- Members: Logan Mader; Lauren Hart; Damien Rainaud; Dillon Trollope; Max Karon
- Past members: Ralph Alexander; Skyler Howren

Once Human is an American heavy metal band from Los Angeles, California, founded in 2014 by producer and former Machine Head/Soulfly guitarist Logan Mader. The band released their debut album, The Life I Remember, in 2015 through earMUSIC.

== History ==
=== The Life I Remember (2014–2015) ===
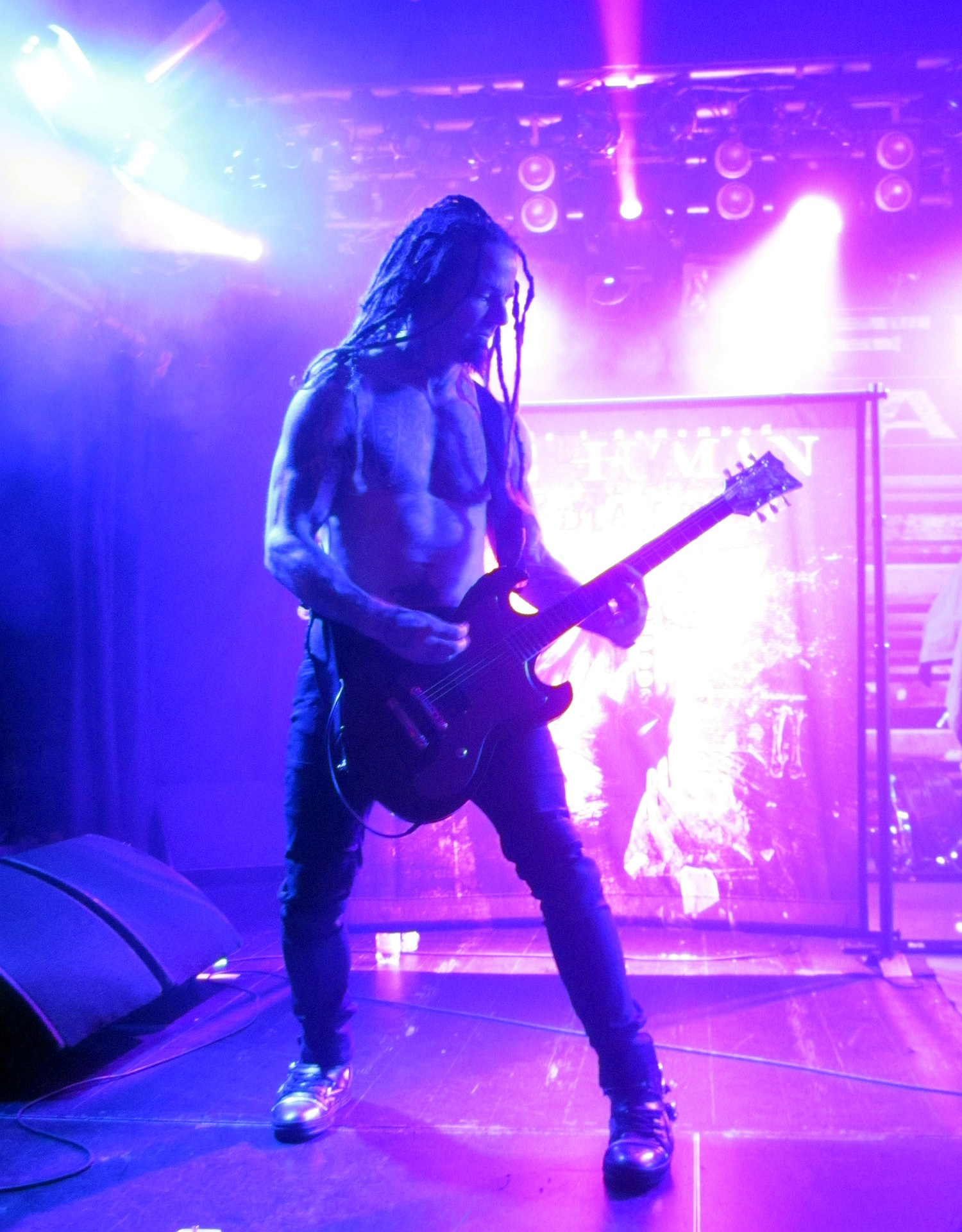
Guitarist Logan Mader performing in 2015

In 2014, after Logan Mader had spent more than a decade away from the stage, Monte Conner of Nuclear Blast sent Lauren Hart to him for a production deal. Once they met, Hart switched from guitars to vocals. Damien Rainaud then joined on bass with Ralph Alexander stepping in on drums. Logan chose not to recruit well known musicians, as he wanted his band to be neither a supergroup nor a side project for each of its members.

On May 26, 2015, the band released a lyric video for title track "The Life I Remember". A similar video for "Terminal" was released on July 10, 2015. Just under one month later on August 7, 2015, the band published "You Cunt", their first music video showing the band performing their song alongside a theatrical plot. It was around this time that Ralph Alexander and the ensemble parted ways, with Dillon Trollope and Skyler Howren joining the band on drums and guitar, respectively.

From late August 2015 until the end of September 2015, the band toured the southern, midwestern and southwestern United States with Fear Factory, The Bloodline and Before the Mourning. Near the beginning of the tour, their debut studio album The Life I Remember was released via earMusic.

In November and December 2015, the group toured Europe with American industrial metal band Fear Factory.

=== Evolution (2016–2021) ===
In 2016, the ensemble stated via their Facebook page that they had started a second studio album. In August 2016, the band stated that they planned to release a music video for a new song titled "Eye of Chaos" within the next month. On September 13, 2016, Evolution, the title of the album, was announced along with a music video for "Eye of Chaos". The full-length album was released on January 20, 2017.

In late September 2016, the band announced that Max Karon from heavy metal ensemble I of Tongues has joined them on guitar.

In late February to mid March 2018 the band were set to tour Australia with supports from In Death..., Rise of Avernus and Hollow World which ended up being cancelled due to the sacking of manager of Sydney venue The Bald Faced Stag who founded the touring company Stag Music Touring for allegedly not paying bands who performed at the venue for over several months. This put the touring company in jeopardy and they worked hard to find a replacement but there was not enough time to do so which led to its cancellation.

=== Scar Weaver (2021–present) ===
On June 30, 2021, the band announced their new album, Scar Weaver, which was released on February 11, 2022, via earMUSIC. The band also released the new song "Deadlock" featuring Robb Flynn on July 1, 2021.

In February 2026, Lauren Hart joined Arch Enemy replacing their previous vocalist Alissa White-Gluz. The sources announcing Hart joining Arch Enemy claim that she has left Once Human, though the band has not released an official statement on whether or not she left.

== Critical reception ==
ArtistDirect stated that "the musical chemistry between Mader and Hart was so palpable that it pulled him out of band retirement" and that "musically, Once Human are as visceral as they are vicious". The site goes on to say that "Hart is a vocal demoness, unleashing the beast that resides deep within her" and that "she is in possession of a fierceness that will leave you shaking in your boots".

Blabbermouth.net described Hart's singing as a "throat-scarring level of vocal brutality that completely contradicts her soft appearance".

Jeremy Borjon of Revolver magazine stated that the band portrays "an impeccably produced, ruthless and mature sound in the vein of Arch Enemy and DevilDriver" with Hart bringing "the metal with clear and compelling screaming fleshed out by a groovy and thunderous rhythm section".

== Band members ==
=== Current ===
- Logan Mader – lead guitar (2014–present)
- Lauren Hart – vocals (2014–present), rhythm guitar, piano (2014–2015)
- Damien Rainaud – bass (2014–present)
- Dillon Trollope – drums (2015–present)
- Max Karon – rhythm guitar (2016–present)

=== Former ===
- Ralph Alexander – drums (2014–2015)
- Skyler Howren – rhythm guitar (2015–2016)

== Discography ==
=== Studio albums ===
- The Life I Remember (earMUSIC, 2015)
- Evolution (earMUSIC, 2017)
- Scar Weaver (2022)

=== Live albums ===
- Stage of Evolution (earMUSIC, 2018)

=== Videos ===
- "The Life I Remember" (2015)
- "Terminal" (2015)
- "You Cunt" (2015)
- "Eye of Chaos" (2016)
- "Gravity" (2016)
- "Dark Matter" (2017)
- "Sledgehammer" (2019)
- "Deadlock" (2021)
- "Cold Arrival" (2021)
- "Erasure" (2022)
