= Hollywood Dell, Los Angeles =

Hollywood Dell
- Neighborhood of Los Angeles
- Location within Central Los Angeles
- Coordinates: 34.111818°N 118.327662°W
- Country: United States
- State: California
- County: Los Angeles
- City: Los Angeles

Area
  - Total: 7.7 sq mi (20 km^{2})

Population
  - Total: 21,092
  - Density: 2,722.3/sq mi (1,051.1/km^{2})
- Time zone: UTC-8 (PST)
  - Summer (DST): UTC-7 (PDT)
- Area code: 90068

The Hollywood Dell is a residential neighborhood located in the Hollywood Hills section of Los Angeles, California, in the lower eastern Santa Monica Mountains. Before Highway 101 was constructed, this area was one with Whitley Heights and considered part of the original Hollywood Hills. The generally accepted borders of "the Dell" are east of Cahuenga, north of Franklin, west of Argyle, and south of the Hollywood Reservoir. It is fully encompassed by zip code 90068.

The Hollywood Dell is so named because it sits "in" the hills just above commercial and tourist-popular Hollywood, rather than atop the hills. In general, one must travel downhill to enter the dell, and uphill to exit it. The roads within the dell are mainly hilly, and many homes are built on hillside lots.

Typical residences in the Hollywood Dell are single-family dwellings with a heavy influence of Spanish Colonial Revival Style architecture. There is also an active homeowners association, with voluntary dues, named the Hollywood Dell Civic Association.

== Notable residents ==
- Frank Capra, director
- Galen Gering, actor
- Michele Greene, actress
- Eva Longoria, actress and producer
- Marilyn Monroe, actress and model
- Audrina Patridge, television personality
- Robert J. Sexton, producer and director
- Tallulah Willis, actress
- Charli XCX, singer-songwriter

== Additional reading ==
- Leslie Anne Wiggins, "Life Here Is Music to Their Ears," Los Angeles Times, April 20, 2008, image 90
