= The Slaughter =

Studio album by Incite
- Released: October 20, 2009
- Genre: Groove metal, thrash metal
- Length: 37:17
- Label: I Scream Music
- Producer: Logan Mader

Incite chronology
The Slaughter (2009)	All Out War (2012)

The Slaughter is the debut studio album by the American groove metal band Incite. It was released in 2009 on I Scream Music.

== Track listing ==
1. "Intro" - 0:57
2. "The Slaughter" - 3:00
3. "Nothing to Fear" - 3:31
4. "Army of Darkness" - 2:24
5. "Time for a Change" - 3:45
6. "Divided We Fail" - 3:16
7. "Rage" - 3:56
8. "Tyranny's End" - 3:52
9. "Die with What You've Done" - 2:42
10. "Down and Out" - 3:00
11. "End Result" - 2:49
12. "Awakening" - 4:05
13. "Absence" - 2:58 (Japanese edition bonus track)

== Personnel ==
- Richie Cavalera - vocals
- Luis Marrufo - bass
- Zak Sofaly - drums
- Kevin "Dis" McAllister - guitars
