= Incite (band) =

American metal band

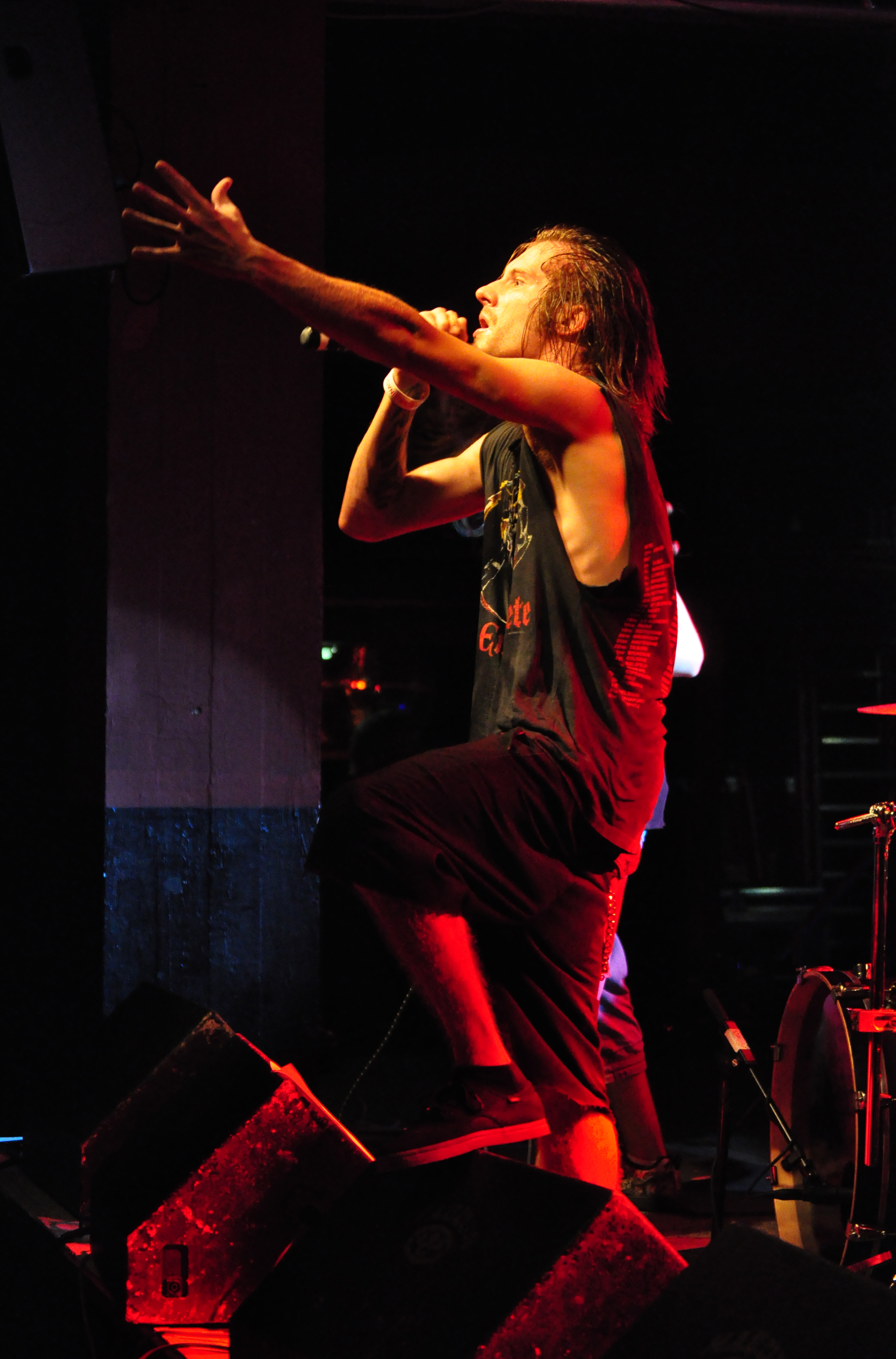
- Frontman Richie Cavalera, 2012

Background information
- Origin: Phoenix, Arizona, U.S.
- Genres: Groove metal, thrash metal
- Years active: 2004–present
- Label: Reigning Phoenix Music
- Members: Richie Cavalera; Christopher Elsten; Lennon Lopez; Layne Richardson
- Past members: Zak Sofaly; Kevin "Dis" McAllister; Luis Marrufo; Gene Macazan; Mike DeLeon
- Website: inciteaod.com

Incite is an American groove/thrash metal band from Phoenix, Arizona, formed in 2004. It consists of vocalist Richie Cavalera, bassist Christopher "EL" Elsten, drummer Lennon Lopez, and guitarist Layne Richardson. Frontman Cavalera is best known as the stepson of Max Cavalera, formerly of Sepultura, and currently bandleader of the bands Soulfly and Cavalera Conspiracy.

Incite have released two EPs, Murder (2006) and Divided We Fail (2007), and seven full-length albums, The Slaughter (2009), the Logan Mader-produced All Out War (2012), Up in Hell (2014), Oppression (2016), Built to Destroy (2019), Wake Up Dead (2022) and Savage New Times (2025). The band is currently signed to Reigning Phoenix Music.

== History ==
Incite was formed in late 2004. After gigging in the local area with Richie appearing on Soulfly's album Dark Ages and Cavalera Conspiracy's Inflikted, the quartet released an EP in 2007 entitled Divided We Fail, with track "Army of Darkness" being the first track posted by the group on MySpace. 2007 also saw an overhaul of the original Incite lineup with Richie Cavalera the sole remaining original member as he sought to make the group more professional. 2009 saw the release of debut LP The Slaughter and tours supporting groups such as Soulfly and The Dillinger Escape Plan, however soon the group parted ways with their record label.

After the group signed a deal with Minus Head Records, they began working on their sophomore effort All Out War, which was eventually released in November 2012. The album was produced by former Machine Head and Soulfly guitarist Logan Mader and was supported by the Maximum Cavalera Tour, with Soulfly (fronted by Richie's stepfather Max Cavalera) and Lody Kong (consisting of Richie's half brothers Zyon and Igor). During this time, guitarist Dis left the band and was replaced by Gene Macazan.

Drummer Zak Sofaly, bassist Luis Marrufo and guitarist Gene Macazan left Incite in 2013 for personal reasons. They were replaced by Derek Lopez, Christopher "EL" Elsten, and Dru Rome respectively; this lineup recorded the band's next three albums Up in Hell (2014), Oppression (2016), and Built to Destroy (2019). Shortly after the release of Built to Destroy, Rome was replaced by Eli Santana.

The band's sixth album, titled Wake Up Dead, was originally set to be released on March 25, but was postponed to April 8, 2022, because of manufacturing issues.

The band played Toledo Death Fest in 2023.

In March 2025, Incite released a music video for "Just a Rat" as the first single from their then-upcoming seventh studio album Savage New Times, followed a month later by "No Mercy No Forgiveness". The album was released on August 15, 2025.

== Members ==
Current lineup

- Richie Cavalera – lead vocals (2004–present)
- Christopher "EL" Elsten – bass, backing vocals (2013–present)
- Derek Lennon Lopez – drums, percussion (2013–present)
- Layne Richardson – guitars (2022–present)

Former members

- Brandon Brimhall – bass (2004–2007)
- David Busch – lead guitar (2004–2007)
- Nathan Bond – rhythm guitar (2004–2007)
- Rafael Mata - rhythm guitar (2004-2005)
- Matt Merisola – drums (2005–2007)
- Zak Sofaly – drums (2007–2013)
- Kevin "Dis" McAllister – lead guitar (2007–2012, 2013–2016), rhythm guitar (2007–2012)
- Luis Marrufo – bass (2007–2013)
- Gene Macazan – guitars (2012–2013)
- Dru "tang" Rome – rhythm guitar (2013–2019), lead guitar (2016–2019)
- Eli Santana – guitars (2019–2022)
- Mike DeLeon – guitars (2022)

Touring members

- Kieran Agnew – guitars (2020)
- Ashley Currie – guitars (2020)

== Discography ==
Studio albums

- The Slaughter (2009)
- All Out War (2012)
- Up in Hell (2014)
- Oppression (2016)
- Built to Destroy (2019)
- Wake Up Dead (2022)
- Savage New Times (2025)

EPs

- Murder (2006)
- Divided We Fail (2008)

Music videos

- "Divided We Fail" (2008)
- "Hopeless" (2012)
- "Fallen" (2014)
- "WTF" (2014)
- "No Remorse" (2016)
- "Stagnant" (2016)
- "Built to Destroy" (2018)
- "Resistance" (2019)
- "Just a Rat" (2025)
