= Built to Destroy (Incite album) =

Studio album by Incite
- Released: January 25, 2019
- Genre: Groove metal, thrash metal
- Label: Minus Head Records
- Producer: Steve Evetts

Incite chronology
Oppression (2016)	Built to Destroy (2019)

Built to Destroy is the fifth studio album by American heavy metal band Incite. Released on January 25, 2019 through via Minus Head Records, the album was mastered by Chris Zeuss Harris and produced by Steve Evetts.

== Composition ==
Lead vocalist Richie Cavalera states that "Our new song 'Ruthless Ways' is about being a piece of sh*t and it finally catching up with you. It's the exact vibe we wanted to explode out the gate with. The song is brutal, catchy, and hella groovy. It's a good feel for what to expect on this new album. Huge riffs, massive drums, bass for days, and a new vocal feel that to me is pure evil and nasty. We kept it real heavy – get your headbang on." Cavalera also states that song "Poisoned by Power" "is about powerful people screwing over the rest of us."

== Critical reception ==
Larry Petro of KNAC states that Built to Destroy "wastes no time delivering its unrelenting attack, eventually leading into a searing guitar solo and leaving the listener with no question as to where the name Incite comes from".

Joe DiVita of Loudwire describes "Poisoned by Power" as "a raucous three-and-a-half minutes of dismal tremolo-picked melodies and jagged chugging, features a guest vocal from Six Feet Under's Chris Barnes, doubling the bark behind Incite's fang-toothed bite".

== Track listing ==
1. "Built to Destroy" 4:09
2. "Ruthless Ways" 3:13
3. "Backbone"
4. "Resistance"
5. "Human Cancer" (feat. Kirk Windstein)
6. "Confronting Darkness"
7. "Leech"
8. "Poisoned by Power" (feat. Chris Barnes)
9. "Cessation"
10. "Hate for Life"
11. "Savior Self"

== Personnel ==
- Richie Cavalera - vocals
- Christopher El - bass
- Lennon Lopez - drums
- Dru Rome - guitars
