= Dirge Within =

American metal band

- Also known as: The Bloodline (2013–2017)
- Origin: Chicago, Illinois, U.S.
- Genres: Groove metal, metalcore, thrash metal
- Years active: 2007–2018
- Label: Rocket Science Ventures/ Sony Red
- Members: Shaun Glass; Chuck Wepfer; Frankie Harchut; Travis Neal

Dirge Within (known as The Bloodline from 2013 to 2017) was an American metal band from Chicago that formed in 2007.

== History ==
=== Formation ===
Dirge Within formed in January 2007, originally calling themselves Dirge, composed of former guitarist of the bands Broken Hope and SOiL, Shaun Glass, having just departed the latter band at the time of formation In March 2007, after the band recorded a three-song demo which included the songs “Forever the Martyr”, “Complacency Strain”, and “Ties that Bind”, Glass (all guitars and Bass) Jerms (vocals) and Jimmy Knight (drums) recorded the band's debut demo at Mercenary Studios in Zion, Illinois with Scott Creekmore. The demo was mixed and mastered by James Murphy of Testament and Death. The band then asked bassist Paz (March 2007) and lead guitarist Matt Szlachta (July 2007) to join as the band was writing material for what would become their debut album Force Fed Lies via Eone.

=== Early Touring and Success ===
The first show that Dirge Within played was in Milwaukee, Wisconsin at The Rave in July 2007. In November 2007, the band also was sponsored by ESP Guitars, Line 6, EMG Electronics, DunlopJagermeister music. The several sponsorships signified a bright future and early positive recognition for the band. Their live show was highly praised showing up many acts on most bills.

In the beginning of 2008, Dirge Within recorded another song entitled “The Last Goodbye” with engineer Chris Wisco in Racine, Wisconsin. James Murphy mixed and mastered the song at Safehouse Productions in April 2008. On July 28, 2008, the band released a demo version of the song "Confession". The song was co produced by Edsel Dope of the band Dope, with James Murphy (Testament, Death) mixing and mastering.

=== Force Fed Lies, name changes, and breakup (2009–2018) ===
In May 2009, Dirge Within signed with E1 Entertainment. On July 26, 2009, Dirge Within was the Jägermeister band at the Chicago date for the Rockstar Mayhem Festival. They shared the stage with God Forbid, All That Remains, and Trivium.

On September 1, 2009, the band released their first full-length album entitled Force Fed Lies. The album was recorded at Belle City Sound with Chris "Wisco" Djuricic. Vocals were co produced by Edsel Dope. The album was produced by Dirge Within, Edsel Dope and Chris Djuricic also helped co-produce the album. The album was mixed by Jeff and Ginge (Bullet for My Valentine) at Not In Pill Studios in Wales.

Dirge Within has toured with bands such as Trivium, DevilDriver, Whitechapel, Chimaira, Static-X, and Darkest Hour. In support of their album, the band toured with Fear Factory from March 22 – May 15, 2010 and toured with Gwar from June 1–26, 2010. Dirge Within also opened for Korn on the Minneapolis stop of their Ballroom Blitz tour on May 17, 2010. In October 2010 the band were part of Greenbay, Wi Savage Fest as well as special show with Five Finger Death Punch in Milwaukee, Wisconsin at The Rave. The band continued touring in 2011 with Kittie to support the digital EP Absolution via Big Time Records. The band signed to Rocket Science Ventures who released their second studio album entitled There Will be Blood on April 10, 2012. The band has done many high-profile shows since the release as well as an addition on the summer radio event 95.1 FM Will Rock Fest which took place August 11, 2012. In October the band announced a new singer will be joining after "Jerms" left the band due to his lack of dedication. In October 2012 it was announced that the new lead singer was Travis Neal of Divine Heresy. In November 2012 the band gave out a free re-recorded version of the track "Without You" with new singer Travis Neal via SoundCloud, and YouTube. The track picked up momentum on several active rock stations, as well as various specialty shows beating out acts like Black Veil Brides and Clutch with no real radio team behind them. In 2013, Dirge Within began writing for a new album.

In September 2013, the band announced that they were changing their band name to The Bloodline. They released their album, We Are One, on March 24, 2015, under the new moniker.

In April 2017, the original singer Jems Genske returned and the band changed the name back to Dirge Within.

In January 2018, it was announced that the band had split up.

Shaun Glass, the band's founder and the only constant member, died on July 1, 2026 at the age of 57, having suffered a stroke one month earlier.

== Band members ==
=== Final lineup ===
- Shaun Glass – rhythm guitar (2007–2018)
- Frankie Harchut – drums (2010–2018)
- Chuck Wepfer – lead guitar (2012–2018)
- Mike Sylvester – bass (2015–2018)
- Jerms Genske – vocals (2007–2012, 2017–2018)

=== Former members ===
- Jimmy Knight – drums (2007–2010)
- Brian Paz – bass (2007–2010)
- Matt Szlachta – lead guitar (2007–2011)
- James Pezanoski – bass (2010–2011)
- Jeff Paulick – bass (2011–2012)
- Travis Neal – vocals (2012–2017)
- AJ Cappellano – bass (2013–2015)

== Discography ==
=== Studio albums ===
As Dirge Within

- Force Fed Lies (2009)
- There Will Be Blood (2012)

As The Bloodline

- We Are One (2015)

=== Extended plays ===
Year	Album	Label
2011	Absolution	Big Time Records

=== Music videos ===
- "Forever the Martyr"
- "Confession"
- "Memories"
- "Poisonous"
