= Mend Your Misery =

Studio album by Dommin
- Released: 2006
- Recorded: 2005
- Genre: Gothic rock
- Length: 45:05
- Label: LMN
- Producer: Lucas Banker; Logan Mader

Dommin chronology
Mend Your Misery (2006)	Dommin E.P. (2009)

Mend Your Misery is the debut studio album by American rock band Dommin, released in December 2006 on LMN records. Mend Your Misery is the band's first and only independent release, whereas 2010’s Love Is Gone is the band's major label debut. Many songs on Mend Your Misery were also featured on Love Is Gone, such as "My Heart, Your Hands", "Tonight", and "One Feeling".

== Track listing ==
1. "My Heart, Your Hands" - 4:56
2. "Dyin' On The Radio" – 2:43
3. "Tonight” - 4:01
4. "Awake" - 5:28
5. "One Feeling” - 2:41
6. "You Can't Love" - 4:55
7. "Without End” - 4:10
8. "Drama Days" – 3:28
9. "Next Day Apologies" - 3:53
10. "The Scene”- 3:58
11. "I Still Lost" - 4:05
12. "Untitled" - 1:38
