= Up in Hell =

Studio album by Incite
- Released: September 2, 2014
- Genre: Groove metal, thrash metal
- Length: 36:01
- Label: Minus Head Records
- Producer: Matt Hyde

Incite chronology
| All Out War (2012) | Up in Hell (2014) | Oppression (2016) |

Up in Hell is the third studio album from American heavy metal band Incite. It was released on September 2, 2014 via Minus Head Records.

== Track listing ==
| No. | Title | Length |
|---|---|---|
| 1. | "Up in Hell" | 4:11 |
| 2. | "WTF" | 3:36 |
| 3. | "False Flag" | 3:15 |
| 4. | "Fallen" | 4:01 |
| 5. | "Rightful Spot" (feat. Liam Cormier) | 3:14 |
| 6. | "Rise to Greatness" | 3:18 |
| 7. | "Who Am I" | 3:55 |
| 8. | "Still Here" | 3:06 |
| 9. | "Losing Grip" | 3:33 |
| 10. | "To the Depths" | 3:52 |
| Total length: | | 36:01 |
