= Logan Mader =

Canadian record producer and guitarist (born 1970)

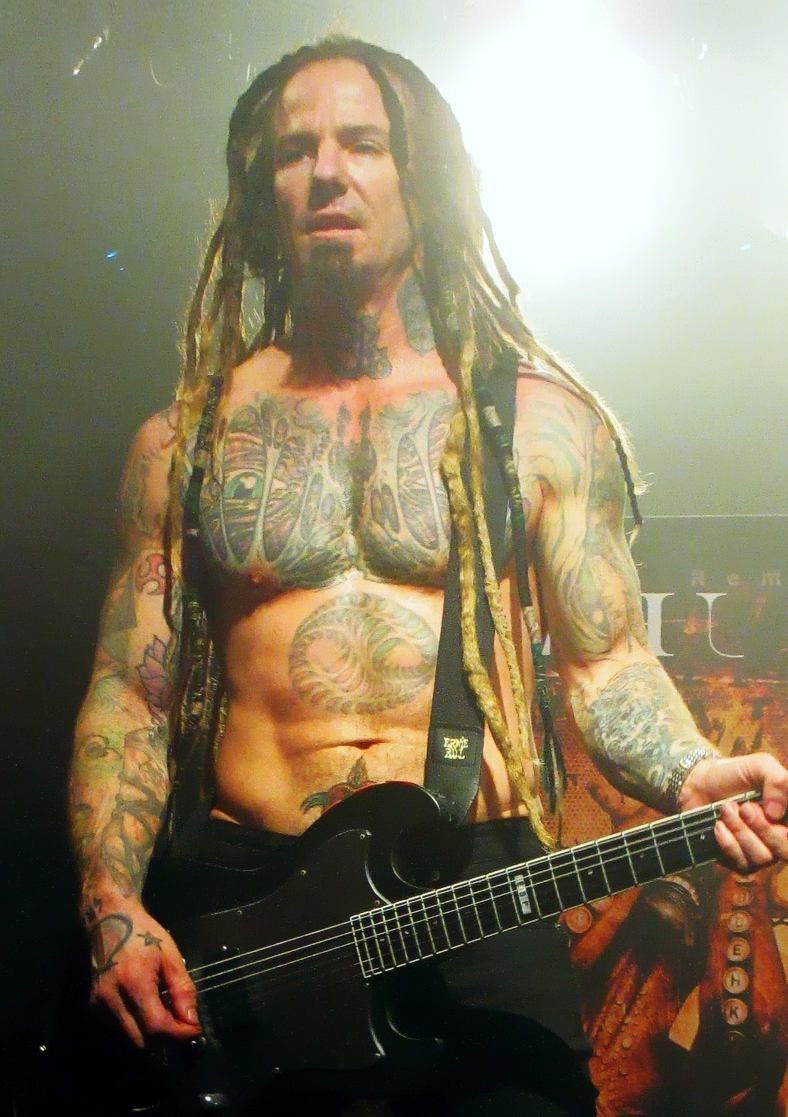
- Mader in 2015

Background information
- Born: Logan Conrad Mader; November 16, 1970 (age 55); Montreal, Quebec, Canada
- Genres: Groove metal; thrash metal; nu metal; alternative metal; melodic death metal; progressive metal
- Occupations: Musician; record producer; songwriter
- Instrument: Guitar
- Years active: 1992–present

Logan Conrad Mader (born November 16, 1970) is a Canadian record producer and musician. He is a guitarist for melodic death metal band Once Human and a former lead guitarist for heavy metal band Machine Head.

Mader is most famous for his time in Machine Head, whose 1994 debut Burn My Eyes was released by Roadrunner Records and quickly became the top-selling debut album in the label's history until Slipknot's debut album. Their second album, The More Things Change..., was released in 1997 and Logan left the band shortly thereafter to divert his energy and time to side projects.

Mader co-founded Dirty Icon Productions, a Los Angeles-based production team. They write, produce, record, mix, master, and engineer music for other artists.

== Career ==
=== Machine Head, Soulfly and Medication ===
Machine Head formed in October 1991, with Mader on lead guitar, Robb Flynn on vocals and rhythm guitar, Adam Duce on bass and Tony Costanza on drums. He played with Machine Head through two albums until early 1998. After Mader's six-year run with the band, he joined Soulfly where he filled the slot as guitarist for their 1998 world tour. Mader's union with Soulfly was short-lived (eight months) and the only track he technically recorded with them was one of the remixes for Quilombo. Wanting to once again pursue his own projects, Mader left Soulfly in January 1999.

Post Soulfly, Mader formed Los Angeles rock band Medication with Whitfield Crane (formerly of Ugly Kid Joe). Due to a series of internal issues, Medication disbanded in February 2003.

=== Stereo Black and production ===
In June, 2003, Mader formed the band New Black, which was later renamed to Stereo Black. Although the band opened for Tesla and Hed PE, made a demo co-produced by Junkie XL they were never signed to a label. The song "Inside" (previously titled "Save Me") was featured in the commercial for Max Payne, the trailer for The Butterfly Effect 2, and in the movie Never Back Down 2: The Beatdown. The instrumental of the song "Fall Again" is featured in MotoGP '07 soundtrack. The song "Denial" is featured on the Scream 4 soundtrack.

In 2017, Mader dismissed Stereo Black as "just a studio project" that started for the purpose of sync licensing. After having some success with that, members tried to turn it into a band, but then he realized he wanted to become a full-time producer instead.

=== Return to live music and further production work ===
Mader announced his new project, Once Human, in May 2015, which features newcomers Lauren Hart (vocals), Damian Rainauld (bass) and Ralph Alexander (drums). The group signed to earMUSIC and released their debut album, The Life I Remember, in September 2015.

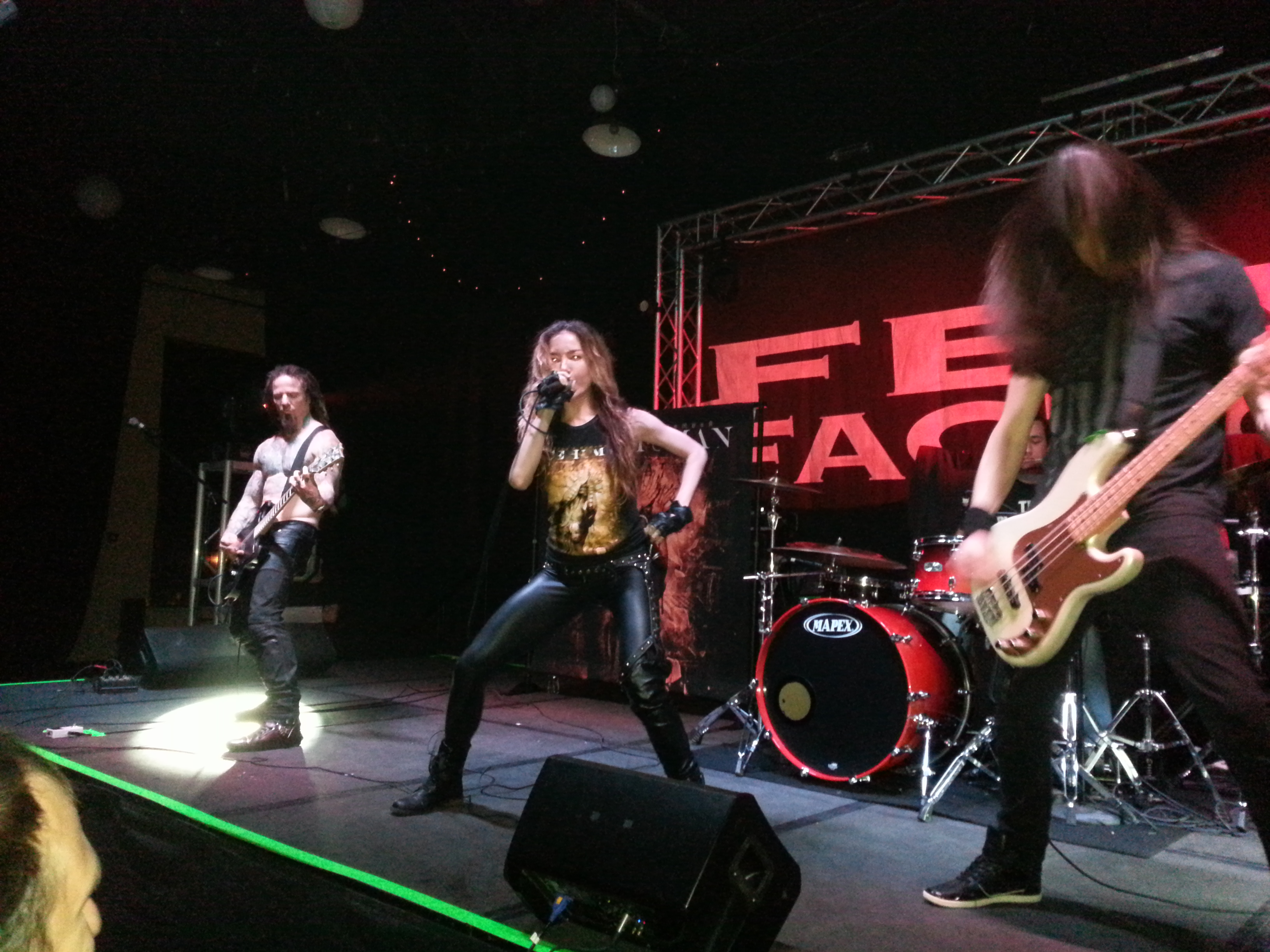
Mader (left) with Once Human in 2015

In August and September 2015, they toured the southern, midwestern and southwestern United States with Fear Factory, The Bloodline and Before the Mourning.

In 2016, Mader participated in music-production education through the Nail the Mix platform, where he taught a mixing class based on Gojira's song “Toxic Garbage Island.”

In March 2019, it was announced that Mader (along with drummer Chris Kontos) would perform with Machine Head for the first time in 21 years with a tour celebrating the 25th anniversary of the release of Burn My Eyes; however, he and Kontos did not officially rejoin the band.

== Discography ==
With Machine Head

- Burn My Eyes (1994)
- The More Things Change... (1997)
- Live at Dynamo Open Air 1997 (2019) – archive live album
- My Hands Are Empty (2020) – standalone single

With Soulfly

- Soulfly Digipak (1998) – appears on "Quilombo (Extreme Ragga Dub Remix)"
- Tribe (1999)
- Live at Dynamo Open Air 1998 (2018) – archive live album

With Medication

- Medication (EP, 2002)
- Prince Valium (2002)

With Stereo Black

- Stereo Black (Demo) (2005)

With Once Human

- The Life I Remember (2015)
- Evolution (2017)
- Scar Weaver (2022)

Guest appearances

- Roadrunner United – The All-Star Sessions (2005)
- Jamie Christopherson – Metal Gear Rising: Revengeance soundtrack (2013)
- Tina Guo – Cello Metal (2015)

== Albums produced ==
Year	Artist	Title	Label	Role
2000	Deep	Pieces of Nothing	Pavement Music	Mixing
2002	Medication	Medication (EP)	Locomotive Music	Producer, engineer, guitar, writer
2002	Misura	The Subtle Kiss of a Sledgehammer	Too Damn Hype Records	Mixing
2002	Medication	Prince Valium	Locomotive	Producer, engineer, guitar, backing vocals, lyrics (tracks 10 and 12), writer (tracks 2, 3, 5, 7, 8, 10–13)
2003	Pitchshifter	Bootlegged, Distorted, Remixed and Uploaded (Compilation)	PSI Records	Remixing
2003	The Deadsexy Inc.	BreakMe (EP)	Electro Shock Records, XIII Bis Records	Mixing (track 6)
2004	Salem's Cradle	4-Song Adavanced Promo (EP)	N/A	Mixing and mastering
2004	Various	The Blackest Album 4: An Industrial Tribute To Metallica	Cleopatra Records	Producer, mixing (track 2)
2004	Wartorn	Early Release Full Length Album	Independent	Mixing and mastering
2004	Scarling	Sweet Heart Dealer	Sympathy for the Record Industry	Engineer
2004	Hypnofugue	Laugh at the World	Music Gallery International	Producer
2004	Rikets	Anything for the Devil (EP)	Corporate Punishment Records	Mixing and mastering
2005	A Dying Dream	Now or Never (EP)	Frontline Records, Mediaskare Records (2006 reissue)	Mixing
2005	K-Again	Memories of an Evolution (EP)	Self-released, Underscore Lab/Musicast (France)	Producer, engineer, mixing and mastering
2005	Bleed the Sky	Paradigm in Entropy	Nuclear Blast Records	Mastering
2005	FM Revolver	Leaving Madeira (EP)	Self-released	Engineer, mixing
2005	New Dead Radio	Avalon Bridge Will Burn	Mediaskare	Editing
2005	So Abused	Community Service	Self-released	Mastering (track 1)
2005	Contra	This Machine Kills (EP)	Mediaskare	Producer, engineer, mixing and mastering
2005	Trigger Point	A Silent Protest	Corporate Punishment	Producer, engineer, mixing, mastering, programming, sound designer
2005	Cloud Nine	Quick as Lightning	Tokuma Japan Communications	Mixing
2005	Roadrunner United	The All-Star Sessions	Roadrunner Records	Editing (tracks 2, 5, 11 and 17), mixing, mastering, guitar (track 5)
2005	Allele	Point of Origin	Corporate Punishment	Mastering
2006	Media Lab	Bleeding Memory	Sunland Records	Producer, engineer, mixing, mastering, writer (tracks 1 and 7)
2006	Junkie XL	Today	Roadrunner, Ultra Records	Recording engineer (vocals)
2006	Silent Civilian	Rebirth of the Temple	Mediaskare	Producer, mixing, mastering, lyrics (track 3)
2006	Twin Method	The Volume of Self	Crash Music	Producer, engineer, mixing and mastering
2006	Ill Niño	The Under Cover Sessions (EP)	Cement Shoes Records	Mixing
2006	Dommin	Mend Your Misery	LMN Records	Producer
2007	W.A.S.P.	Dominator	Demolition Records	Mixing and mastering
2007	Five Finger Death Punch	The Way of the Fist	Firm Music, Spinefarm Records, Prospect Park	Mixing and mastering
2007	Still Remains	The Serpent	Roadrunner	Mixing
2007	Divine Heresy	Bleed the Fifth	Century Media Records (US), Roadrunner (worldwide)	Producer, engineer, mixing, mastering, writer (tracks 6, 9 and 10)
2007	Demia	Insidious	Scarlet Records	Producer, mixing, mastering
2007	Insolence	Ins 03 Naked (EP)	Powerslave Records	Producer (tracks 3 and 5)
2008	Junkie XL	Booming Back at You	Artwerk	Recording (tracks 6 and 11)
2008	Cavalera Conspiracy	Inflikted	Roadrunner	Co-producer, engineer, mixing, mastering
2008	Flatline	Pave the Way	Stand and Deliver Records	Engineer, mixing and mastering
2008	Soulfly	Conquer	Roadrunner	Mixing (track 14)
2008	Gojira	The Way of All Flesh	Listenable Records (Europe), Prosthetic Records (US)	Engineer (drums), mixing and mastering
2008	Psycroptic	Ob(Servant)	Nuclear Blast, Stomp Entertainment (Aus & NZ)	Mixing and mastering
2008	Burning the Masses	Mind Control	Mediaskare	Mixing and mastering
2009	Hamlet	La Puta y el Diablo	Roadrunner	Mixing and mastering
2009	Dommin	Dommin E.P.	Roadrunner	Producer, mixing and mastering
2009	Devildriver	Pray for Villains	Roadrunner	Producer, mixing, mastering, additional lyrics (tracks 2 and 12)
2009	Agony	The Devil's Breath	Cinismo Records	Mixing
2009	Divine Heresy	Bringer of Plagues	Century Media (US), Roadrunner (worldwide)	Producer, engineer, mixing, writer (additional vocal melodies), additional lyrics
2009	Saosin	In Search of Solid Ground	Virgin Records	Producer (track 4)
2009	Echoes of Eternity	As Shadows Burn	Nuclear Blast (US), Massacre Records (Europe)	Producer, mixing
2009	W.A.S.P.	Babylon	Demolition	Mixing and mastering
2009	Incite	The Slaughter	I Scream Records	Producer, mixing and mastering
2009	Achozen	"Salute/Sacrifice"	N/A	Mixing
2009	The Changing	For Obvious Reasons	Self-released	Producer
2010	Dommin	Love Is Gone	Roadrunner	Producer, mixing, mastering, writer (track 15), lyrics (track 14)
2010	Taking Dawn	God of War: Blood & Metal (Split EP)	Roadrunner	Producer, mixing (track 4)
2010	Raintime	Psychromatic	Lifeforce Records	Mixing and mastering
2010	Soulfly	Omen	Roadrunner	Co-producer, engineer, mixing and mastering
2011	Aizen	Winter in Hell	N/A	N/A
2011	Cavalera Conspiracy	Blunt Force Trauma	Roadrunner	Producer, engineer, mixing, mastering
2011	Dwail	Helter Skelter	Klonosphère, Season of Mist	Mixing and mastering
2011	Gojira	"Of Blood & Salt"	N/A	Producer
2011	Channel Zero	Feed 'Em with a Brick	Roadrunner, CNR Music	Producer, engineer, mixing and mastering
2011	World Under Blood	Tactical	Nuclear Blast	Engineer
2011	Kartikeya	Durga Puja (EP)	Grailight Productions	Mixing and mastering (track 1)
2011	Saving Grace	The King Is Coming	Facedown Records	Mastering
2012	Cancer Bats	Dead Set on Living	Distort	Vocal engineer (track 9)
2012	Various	Avengers Assemble (Music from and Inspired by the Motion Picture)	Hollywood Records, Marvel Music	Mixing (track 12)
2012	Fear Factory	The Industrialist	Candlelight Records, AFM Records, Bodog	Recording, tracking (additional), digital editing, writer (additional vocal arrangements)
2012	Bonded by Blood	The Aftermath	Earache Records	Producer, mixing and mastering
2012	Periphery	Periphery II: This Time It's Personal	Sumerian Records (US), Century Media (Europe), Roadrunner (Australia)	Mastering
2012	Tensions Arise	Stand in Defiance (EP)	N/A	Mixing and mastering
2012	Unchained	Oncoming Chaos	M & O Music	Mastering
2012	Hecatombe	"Inner Pain"	Civil Alien Records	Mixing
2012	Incite	All Out War	Minus Head	Producer, engineer, mixing and mastering
2013	Closure	The Silent Witness March	N/A	Mixing and mastering
2013	Jamie Christopherson	Metal Gear Rising: Revengeance – Vocal Tracks	Konami Digital Entertainment, Sumthing Else	Producer (tracks 2, 5, 7, 8, 10, 11, 19, 22, 24, 25, 27, 28), vocal producer (track 6), drum producer (6, 16, 23), vocal recording (1, 9, 13, 14), mixing (tracks 2, 5, 7, 8, 10, 11, 19, 22, 24, 25, 27, 28), guitar (tracks 2, 5, 7, 8, 10, 11, 19, 22, 24, 25, 27, 28), bass (tracks 2, 5, 7, 8, 10, 11, 19, 22, 24, 25, 27, 28), programming (tracks 2, 5, 10, 11, 19, 22, 27, 28), writer (tracks 2, 5, 7, 8, 10, 11, 19, 22, 24, 25, 27, 28), lyrics (tracks 2, 5, 7, 8, 10, 11)
2013	In Death...	Thanatos (EP)	Independent	Mixing and mastering
2013	Bleed from Within	Uprising	Century Media	Mixing and mastering
2013	Dagoba	Post Mortem Nihil Est	Verycords, earMUSIC	Mixing and mastering
2013	Attila	About That Life	Artery Recordings	Programming, sound designer (tracks 2, 6, 10)
2013	Asking Alexandria	From Death to Destiny	Sumerian	Vocal producer (track 12), programming, sound designer (tracks 1–3, 5–13), writer (track 5)
2013	InsIDeaD	Ελευσις (Eleysis)	Noisehead Records	Mixing and mastering
2014	Channel Zero	Kill All Kings	CNR, Metal Blade Records	Producer, mixing and mastering
2014	Devil You Know	The Beauty of Destruction	Nuclear Blast	Producer, engineer, additional lyrics
2014	Septicflesh	Titan	Season of Mist (Europe), Prosthetic (US & Canada), Ward Records	Producer, mixing and mastering
2014	Starset	Transmissions	Razor & Tie	Composer (track 1)
2014	Limp Bizkit	"Endless Slaughter"	Cash Money Records	Mixing
2014	Overunit Machine	Aldaraja	Sliptrick Records	Mixing and mastering
2014	Butcher Babies	Uncovered (EP)	Century Media	Producer, mixing
2015	Achozen	Boombot Pro	N/A	Mixing
2015	Black Bomb A	Comfortable Hate	Verycords	Mixing and mastering
2015	All Tomorrows	Sol Agnates	Self-released, La Somba Records	Mastering
2015	Dagoba	Tales of the Black Dawn	earMUSIC, Verycords	Mixing and mastering
2015	Bullet for My Valentine	Venom	Sony Music, RCA Records	Mixing (track 15)
2015	Butcher Babies	Take It Like a Man	Century Media	Producer, mixing, mastering, writer (tracks 5, 6, 7 and 10)
2015	Once Human	The Life I Remember	earMUSIC	Producer, engineer, mixing, mastering, guitar, programming, writer
2015	W.A.S.P.	Golgotha	Napalm Records	Mixing
2015	Devil You Know	They Bleed Red	Nuclear Blast	Mixing (track 14)
2016	Hope Deferred	Demo	Independent	Mixing and mastering
2016	Khepra	Cosmology Divine	Rain Without End Records, Naturmacht Productions	Mixing and mastering
2017	Recrucide	The Cycle	LQC Records	Mastering
2017	Once Human	Evolution	earMUSIC	Producer, engineer, mixing, guitar, writer
2017	Art of Anarchy	The Madness	Another Century Records	Writer (track 1)
2017	Invidia	As the Sun Sleeps	SPV	Producer, engineer, mixing
2017	The Nocturnal Affair	"Ghosts on the Horizon"	Into the Darkness Records	Producer, engineer
2017	Harmonic Generator	Heart, Flesh, Skull & Bones	N/A	Mixing and mastering
2017	Half Blood	Half Blood	Independent	Producer (vocals), mixing and mastering
2018	Rise of Avernus	Eigengrau	Code666 Records	Mixing and mastering
2018	W.A.S.P.	Reidolized: The Soundtrack to The Crimson Idol	Napalm	Mixing
2018	Age of Arcadia	Eleysis	Self-released	Mixing and mastering
2018	Persefone	In Lak'Ech (EP)	ViciSolum Productions	Mixing and mastering (track 1)
2018	Will Haven	Muerte	Minus Head	Mastering
2018	Kamelot	The Shadow Theory	Napalm	Engineer (additional)
2018	Dee Snider	For the Love of Metal	Napalm	Writer (track 10)
2018	Dark Sky Choir	End of Days	Independent	Engineer
2018	Aember	"Melancholia"	Independent	Mixing and mastering
2019	Echoes of Eternity	Ageless	Independent	Mixing and mastering
2019	Serpents	Temet Nosce	Independent, Trve Media	Producer (additional), mixing and mastering
2019	Necronomicon	Unus	Season of Mist	Mixing
2019	Once Human	"Sledgehammer"	earMUSIC	Producer, mixing, guitar
2020	Aember	"Demonic"	Independent	Mixing and mastering
2020	Voices of Ruin	Path to Immortality	M-Theory Audio	Producer, engineer, mixing and mastering
2020	Brave the Cold	Scarcity	Mission Two Entertainment	Producer
2021	Hemlock	Karmageddon	Independent	Mixing and mastering
2021	Hemlock	Violence & Victory	Independent	Mixing and mastering
2021	Cerebellion	Something You Can Say (EP)	Independent	Producer, mixing and mastering
2021	Ma'anish	Heal	Independent	Mixing and mastering
2022	Alphoenix	"Return of the Savior"	Project Phoenix	Engineer, mixing and mastering
2022	Once Human	Scar Weaver	earMUSIC	Producer, mixing, guitar, writer
2023	G-nomes	Nouveau départ	Independent	Mastering
2024	Cerebellion	"Burst"	Independent	Mixing

First Original member	Machine Head guitarist 1991–1998	Succeeded by Ahrue Luster
