= Oppression (album) =

Studio album by Incite
- Released: April 22, 2016
- Recorded: Trax East Studios
- Genre: Groove metal, thrash metal
- Length: 33:05
- Label: Independent
- Producer: Steve Evetts

Incite chronology
Up in Hell (2014)	Oppression (2016)	Built to Destroy (2019)

Oppression is the fourth studio album by American heavy metal band Incite. It was released on April 22, 2016, through Minus Head Records and was produced by Steve Evetts.

== Track listing ==
No.	Title	Length
1.	"Never Surrender"	3:51
2.	"Lost Reality"	3:09
3.	"Stagnant"	3:24
4.	"No Remorse"	2:52
5.	"Oppression"	3:12
6.	"Life's Disease" (feat. Connor Garritty of All Hail the Yeti)	3:06
7.	"Forced into Life"	3:15
8.	"Worst of Me"	3:27
9.	"I Want It All" (feat. Jose Mangin)	3:35
10.	"Silenced"	3:13
Total length:		33:05

Professional ratings
Review scores
Source	Rating
Metal Injection	8/10 stars
