= Fear Factory discography =

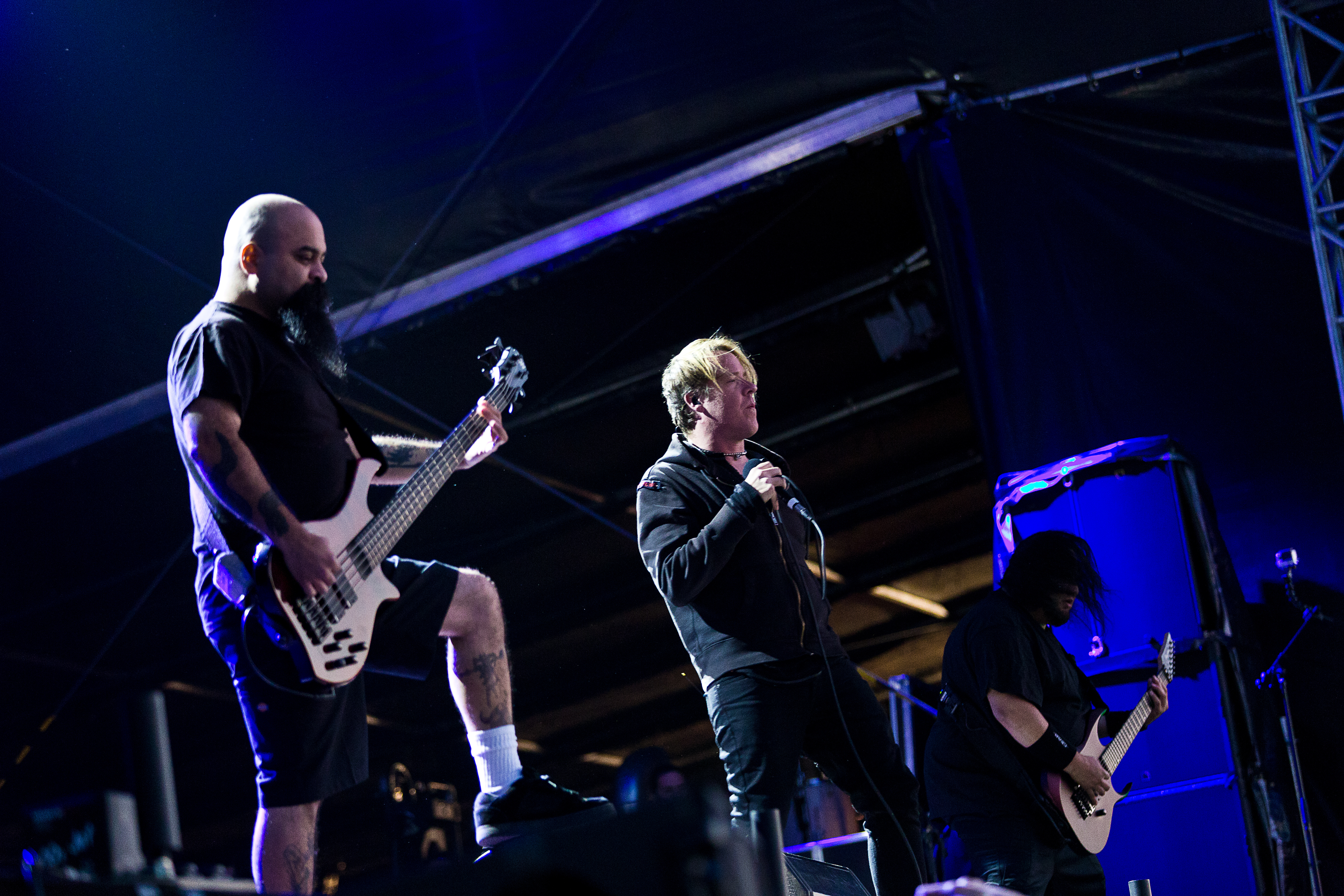
- Fear Factory in 2015
- Studio albums: 10
- Extended plays: 5
- Compilation albums: 3
- Singles: 21
- Video albums: 1
- Music videos: 14
- Remix albums: 2
- Demo albums: 1

The discography of Fear Factory, an American industrial metal band, consists of ten studio albums, three compilation albums, two remix albums, one demo album, one video album, five extended plays, twenty-one singles and thirteen music videos. Fear Factory formed in 1989, signing to Roadrunner Records three years later. The band's debut studio album, Soul of a New Machine, was released in 1992. The following year, Fear Is the Mindkiller was released as an EP, featuring remixes by Rhys Fulber and Bill Leeb of Front Line Assembly. In 1995, Fear Factory released their second studio album, Demanufacture, which peaked at number 27 on the UK Albums Chart, and was later certified silver by the British Phonographic Industry (BPI); it was followed two years later by another remix project, Remanufacture (Cloning Technology), which this time featured contributions from a number of different remixers, including many techno-oriented artists, as well as the band themselves.

Released in 1998, Obsolete became the band's most successful album, peaking at number 77 on the Billboard 200 and hitting the top 30 in several countries. The album received a gold certification by the Recording Industry Association of America (RIAA). Their next album, 2001's Digimortal, peaked at number ten in Australia, but by the next year, Fear Factory disbanded and Roadrunner issued their original 1991 recordings on the demo album Concrete. The band reformed sans Dino and signed to the independent record label Liquid 8 for Archetype, released in 2004. The album peaked at number 30 on the Billboard 200 and number 18 in Australia. Transgression was issued by Calvin Records a year later. Dino Cazares rejoined the band in 2009, and they recorded Mechanize, which was released the following year. Mechanize was followed two years later by The Industrialist (2012), and then three years later by Genexus (2015). Due to both legal and personal issues surrounding the band, Fear Factory did not release their next studio album Aggression Continuum until 2021, which marked the last one to include original vocalist Burton C. Bell, who had already recorded his vocals for the album in 2017 and left the band nearly a year prior to its release.

== Albums ==
=== Studio albums ===
List of studio albums, with selected chart positions and certifications
Title	Album details	Peak chart positions										Sales	Certifications
Title	Album details	US	AUS	AUT	BEL	FIN	FRA	GER	NLD	SWE	UK	Sales	Certifications
Soul of a New Machine	Released: August 25, 1992 (US); Label: Roadrunner; Formats: CD, cassette, LP, digital download	—	—	—	—	—	—	—	—	—	—	US: 91,888	
Demanufacture	Released: June 13, 1995 (US); Label: Roadrunner; Formats: CD, cassette, LP, digital download	—	—	—	—	—	—	31	53	—	27	US: 240,229	ARIA: Gold; BPI: Silver
Obsolete	Released: July 28, 1998 (US); Label: Roadrunner; Formats: CD, LP, cassette, digital download	77	14	24	10	36	31	12	32	28	20	US: 406,247	RIAA: Gold; ARIA: Gold
Digimortal	Released: April 24, 2001 (US); Label: Roadrunner; Formats: CD, LP, digital download	32	10	26	39	25	40	11	60	31	24	US: 156,264	
Archetype	Released: April 20, 2004 (US); Label: Liquid 8; Formats: CD, digital download	30	18	25	50	30	50	26	52	47	41	US: 96,509	
Transgression	Released: August 23, 2005 (US); Label: Calvin; Formats: CD, digital download	45	26	44	74	38	87	37	54	56	77	US: 19,000	
Mechanize	Released: February 9, 2010 (US); Label: Candlelight; Formats: CD, LP, digital download	72	24	46	74	31	25	31	87	51	58	US: 17,750	
The Industrialist	Released: June 5, 2012 (US); Label: Candlelight; Formats: CD, LP, digital download	38	—	56	—	23	—	27	—	—	106	US: 13,000	
Genexus	Released: August 7, 2015; Label: Nuclear Blast; Formats: CD, LP, digital download	37	15	25	35	25	55	17	34	—	31		
Aggression Continuum	Released: June 18, 2021; Label: Nuclear Blast; Formats: CD, LP, digital download	—	15	31	76	—	—	20	—	—	98		
"—" denotes a recording that did not chart or was not released in that territory.

=== Compilation albums ===
List of compilation albums
Title	Album details
Messiah	Released: 1999; Label: Roadrunner; Formats: CD
Hatefiles	Released: April 8, 2003 (US); Label: Roadrunner; Formats: CD, digital download
The Best of Fear Factory	Released: September 11, 2006 (US); Label: Roadrunner; Formats: CD, digital download
The Complete Roadrunner Collection 1992–2001	Released: November 9, 2012 (US); Label: Roadrunner; Formats: CD box set, digital download

=== Archival albums ===
List of demo albums, with selected chart positions
Title	Album details	UK chart
Concrete	Released: July 30, 2002 (US); Label: Roadrunner; Formats: CD, digital download	190

=== Remix albums ===
List of remix albums, with selected chart positions
Title	Album details	Peak chart positions					
Title	Album details	US	AUS	BEL (FL)	GER	NZ	UK
Remanufacture	Released: May 20, 1997 (US); Label: Roadrunner; Formats: CD, cassette, digital download	158	33	15	93	47	22
Recoded	Released: October 28, 2022; Label: Nuclear Blast; Formats: CD, cassette, digital download	—	—	—	—	—	—

=== Video albums ===
List of video albums
Title	Album details
Digital Connectivity	Released: December 18, 2001 (US); Label: Roadrunner; Formats: DVD, VHS

== Extended plays ==
List of extended plays, with selected chart positions
Title	EP details	Peak chart positions	
Title	EP details	AUS	UK
Fear Is the Mindkiller	Released: April 14, 1993 (US); Label: Roadrunner; Formats: CD, cassette, LP, digital download	—	—
Burn	Released: 1997 (UK); Label: Roadrunner; Formats: CD, LP	—	97
The Gabber Mixes	Released: 1997 (NLD); Label: Mokum; Formats: LP	—	—
Resurrection	Released: September 14, 1998 (UK); Label: Roadrunner; Formats: CD	89	98
Live on the Sunset Strip	Released: August 9, 2005 (US); Label: Calvin; Formats: CD	—	—
"—" denotes a recording that did not chart or was not released in that territory.

== Singles ==
List of singles, with selected chart positions, showing year released and album name
Title	Year	Peak chart positions					Album
Title	Year	US Sales	US Alt.	US Main. Rock	AUS	UK	Album
"Replica"	1995	—	—	—	—	—	Demanufacture
"Dog Day Sunrise"	1995	—	—	—	—	85	Demanufacture
"Shock"	1998	—	—	—	—	—	Obsolete
"Edgecrusher"	1998	—	—	—	—	—	Obsolete
"Resurrection"	1998	—	—	—	89	88	Obsolete
"Descent"	1998	—	—	38	—	—	Obsolete
"Cars" (featuring Gary Numan)	1999	—	38	16	89	57	Obsolete
"Linchpin"	2001	—	—	31	—	85	Digimortal
"Invisible Wounds (Dark Bodies)"	2001	—	—	—	—	—	Digimortal
"Cyberwaste"	2004	—	—	—	—	—	Archetype
"Archetype"	2004	—	—	—	—	—	Archetype
"Bite the Hand That Bleeds"	2004	47	—	—	—	—	Archetype
"Supernova"	2005	—	—	—	—	—	Transgression
"Moment of Impact"	2005	—	—	—	—	—	Transgression
"Transgression"	2006	—	—	—	—	—	Transgression
"Powershifter"	2009	—	—	—	—	—	Mechanize
"Fear Campaign"	2010	—	—	—	—	—	Mechanize
"Final Exit"	2010	—	—	—	—	—	Mechanize
"Recharger"	2012	—	—	—	—	—	The Industrialist
"New Messiah"	2012	—	—	—	—	—	The Industrialist
"The Industrialist"	2012	—	—	—	—	—	The Industrialist
"Soul Hacker"	2015	—	—	—	—	—	Genexus
"Protomech"	2015	—	—	—	—	—	Genexus
"Dielectric"	2015	—	—	—	—	—	Genexus
"Disruptor"	2021	—	—	—	—	—	Aggression Continuum
"Fuel Injected Suicide Machine"	2021	—	—	—	—	—	Aggression Continuum
"Recode"	2021	—	—	—	—	—	Aggression Continuum
"Monolith"	2021	—	—	—	—	—	Aggression Continuum
"Roboticist"	2026	—	—	—	—	—	Roboticist
"—" denotes a recording that did not chart or was not released in that territory.

== Music videos ==
List of music videos, showing year released and director
Title	Year	Album	Director(s)
"Replica"	1995	Demanufacture	Bill Ward
"Resurrection"	1998	Obsolete	William Morrison
"Cars" (featuring Gary Numan)	1998	Obsolete	William Morrison
"Linchpin"	2001	Digimortal	Thomas Mignone
"Cyberwaste"	2004	Archetype	Dale Resteghini
"Archetype"	2004	Archetype	Cesario Montano
"Bite the Hand That Bleeds"	2004	Archetype	Tony Ballejos
"Transgression"	2005	Transgression	Michael Sarna
"Spinal Compression"	2005	Transgression	Michael Sarna
"Moment of Impact"	2005	Transgression	Michael Sarna
"Fear Campaign"	2010	Mechanize	Ian McFarland and Mike Pecci
"Powershifter"	2010	Mechanize	Myles Dyer
"The Industrialist"	2012	The Industrialist	James Zahn
"Dielectric"	2015	Genexus	Ramon Boutsiveth
"Expiration Date"	2016	Genexus	Tommy Jones
"Disruptor"	2021	Aggression Continuum	Patrik Nuorteva and Tuomas Kurikka
"Recode"	2021	Aggression Continuum	Patrik Nuorteva and Tuomas Kurikka
"Roboticist"	2026	Roboticist	Vicente Cordero
