= The Best of Fear Factory =

Greatest hits album by Fear Factory
- Released: September 12, 2006
- Genre: Industrial metal, groove metal, death metal
- Length: 54:26
- Label: Roadrunner
- Producer: Fear Factory, Colin Richardson, Rhys Fulber, Greg Reely

Fear Factory chronology
Gigantour (2006)	The Best of Fear Factory (2006)	Mechanize (2010)

Professional ratings
Review scores
Source	Rating
AllMusic	4.5/5 stars

The Best of Fear Factory is the third compilation album by American industrial metal band Fear Factory, released on Roadrunner Records, featuring a collection of the band's music with the label (as such, Archetype and Transgression material are not included). The record was released without Fear Factory's involvement (they were signed to Liquid 8 Records at the time of the album's release), so it's unlikely that the album is officially recognized by the band themselves. Songs from Concrete, as well as their various compilation, live and remix albums, are not included.

The album was released on September 12, simultaneously with similarly unsanctioned best-of collections of the bands Sepultura, Type O Negative, and Ill Niño.

== Track listing ==
No.	Title	Original release	Length
1.	"Martyr"	Soul of a New Machine	4:05
2.	"Scapegoat"	Soul of a New Machine	4:32
3.	"Scumgrief"	Soul of a New Machine	4:07
4.	"Demanufacture"	Demanufacture	4:14
5.	"Self-Bias Resistor"	Demanufacture	5:13
6.	"Zero Signal"	Demanufacture	5:57
7.	"Replica"	Demanufacture	3:57
8.	"Shock"	Obsolete	4:58
9.	"Edgecrusher" (feat. Pat Hoed & DJ Zodiac)	Obsolete	3:39
10.	"Resurrection"	Obsolete	6:36
11.	"Cars" (feat. Gary Numan (Gary Numan cover))	Obsolete	3:37
12.	"Linchpin"	Digimortal	3:25
Total length:			54:26

== Personnel ==
- Burton C. Bell − vocals
- Dino Cazares − guitars, bass, audio mixing
- Raymond Herrera − drums
- Christian Olde Wolbers − bass
- Monte Conner − compilation
- Joseph Cultice − photography
- Rhys Fulber − keyboards, audio programming, producer, audio mixing
- Caroline Greyshock − photography
- Steve Harris − audio mixing
- Junkie XL − mixing
- Brad Miller − photography
- UE Nastasi − assembly
- Gary Numan − vocals on track 11
- Mike Plotnikoff − mixing
- Greg Reely − producer, mixing
- Colin Richardson − producer, mixing
- Anthony St. James − photography
- Neil Zlozower − cover photo
