= Hatefiles =

Compilation album by Fear Factory
- Released: April 8, 2003
- Recorded: 1996–2001
- Genres: Industrial metal; electronic; groove metal
- Length: 75:29
- Label: Roadrunner
- Producers: Fear Factory; Rhys Fulber; David Tickle; Thom Panunzio; Greg Reely; Colin Richardson; Rick "Soldier" Will

Fear Factory chronology
Concrete (2002)	Hatefiles (2003)	Archetype (2004)

Professional ratings
Review scores
Source	Rating
AllMusic	3/5 stars

Hatefiles is the second compilation album by American industrial metal band Fear Factory, released by Roadrunner Records on April 8, 2003. It contains rare, unreleased and remixed tracks. The album is notable as it contains "Terminate", the last song to be recorded with original guitarist Dino Cazares until his return to the band in 2009. Graphic designer Dave McKean's artwork is also used.

Tracks 2, 3, 4, 5 and 13 all appeared on the Australian-only release of the Linchpin EP. Track 5 also appeared on the soundtrack for the film Resident Evil, while track 13 appeared on Ozzfest: Second Stage Live. 14, 15 and 16 appeared on the Burn single from Remanufacture. Track 17 was available on the 7" vinyl-only The Gabber Mixes EP. Tracks 9 and 10 are early versions of the tracks which would later appear on Demanufacture as mixed by Colin Richardson, the album's producer. The final album mix is credited to Greg Reely. Track 11 is the same as the version that appeared on the limited edition of Obsolete, but mostly features only Gary Numan on vocals. Tracks 7 and 8 appeared on the Cars single. Track 12 is an early demo of the song (Invisible Wounds) Dark Bodies from Digimortal. Tracks 1, 6, 9, 10, 11, 12 and 18 are previously unreleased.

== Track listing ==
No.	Title	Length
1.	"Terminate"	4:06
2.	"Frequency"	3:00
3.	"Demolition Racer"	0:50
4.	"Machine Debaser"	4:16
5.	"Invisible Wounds" (The Suture Mix)	3:36
6.	"Resurrection" (T.L.A. Big Rock Mix)	4:04
7.	"Edgecrusher" (Urban Assault Mix)	4:34
8.	"Descent" (Falling Deeper Mix)	4:36
9.	"Body Hammer" (Colin Richardson Mix)	5:09
10.	"Zero Signal" (Colin Richardson Mix)	5:41
11.	"Cars" (Numanoid Mix)	3:41
12.	"Dark Bodies" (Demo)	3:59
13.	"Replica" (Live)	3:59
14.	"Cyberdyne"	4:28
15.	"Refueled"	4:37
16.	"Transgenic"	5:42
17.	"Manic Cure"	5:08
18.	"New Breed" (Spoetnik Mix)	3:54
Total length:		75:29

== Personnel ==
- John Aguto – mixing
- Duane Baron – engineer
- John Bechdel – keyboards, programming
- Burton C. Bell – vocals
- Dino Cazares – guitar, mixing
- Monte Conner – compilation, song notes
- Fear Factory – producer
- Rhys Fulber – keyboards, programming, producer, remixing
- Caroline Greyshock – photography
- Raymond Herrera – drums
- Ted Jensen – mastering
- Junkie XL – engineer, remixing
- Tom Lord-Alge – remixing
- George Marino – mastering
- Dave McKean – illustrations, cover design
- UE Nastasi – assembly
- Thom Panunzio – producer, mixing
- Mike Plotnikoff – mixing
- Greg Reely – producer, mixing
- Colin Richardson – producer, mixing
- Technohead – remixing
- David Tickle – producer
- Rebecca Waterfall – design
- Rick "Soldier" Will – producer, mixing
- Christian Olde Wolbers – bass
