= Digital Connectivity =

Video by Fear Factory
- Released: December 18, 2001
- Genre: Industrial metal, groove metal
- Label: Roadrunner
- Director: Amber Cordero
- Producer: Amber Cordero, Burton C. Bell

Digital Connectivity is a DVD by American industrial metal band Fear Factory released in 2001 on Roadrunner Records.

During the selection separated into four parts, "Lifeblind"'s intro is repeated. The menu features each document a separate phase of Fear Factory's evolution as a band. The film includes all of the band's music videos ("Replica", "Resurrection", "Cars" and "Linchpin"), as well as rare backstage footage, live clips and band interviews.

The DVD also includes five photo galleries covering every phase of the Fear Factory evolution, the complete and detailed Fear Factory discography, the definitive Fear Factory story written by vocalist Burton C. Bell and eight bonus audio tracks (rare and previously unreleased B-sides and remixes.

== Track listing ==
1. "Martyr" (live)
2. "Scapegoat" (live)
3. "Scumgrief" (live)
4. "Demanufacture" (live)
5. "Self Bias Resistor" (live)
6. "Replica" (music video)
7. "Dog Day Sunrise" (live)
8. "Shock" (live)
9. "Edgecrusher" (live)"
10. "Resurrection" (music video)
11. "Cars" (music video)
12. "What Will Become?" (live)
13. "Damaged" (live)
14. "Linchpin" (music video)
15. "Digimortal" (live)

== Live credits ==
- "Martyr", "Scapegoat", "Scumgrief":

Recorded on May 29, 1993 at the Dynamo Open Air Festival, Netherlands

- "Demanufacture":

Recorded on May 5, 1996 at The Forum, London, England

- "Self Bias Resistor":

Recorded in 1995 for MTV's Headbangers Ball

- "Dog Day Sunrise":

Recorded on February 11, 1996 at R.P.M. Warehouse, Toronto, Canada

- "Shock", "Edgecrusher":

Recorded on February 14, 1999 at Club Citta, Tokyo, Japan

- "What Will Become?":

Recorded on January 19, 2001 at the House of Blues, Las Vegas, United States

- "Damaged":

Recorded on August 26, 2001 at Reading Festival, England

- "Digimortal":

Recorded on February 6, 2001 at the Warehouse, Toronto, Canada
