= Messiah (Fear Factory album) =

Greatest hits album by Fear Factory
- Released: 1999
- Genre: Industrial metal; groove metal; death metal
- Length: 44:54
- Label: Roadrunner

Fear Factory chronology
Resurrection (1998)	Messiah (1999)	Digimortal (2001)

Messiah is the first compilation album by American industrial metal band Fear Factory, released in 1999 by Roadrunner Records. It includes one song from Soul of a New Machine, six from Demanufacture, two from Remanufacture, and one bonus track from Obsolete. It is the soundtrack to the 2000 video game Messiah.

== Track listing ==
No.	Title	Length
1.	"Crash Test" (from Soul of a New Machine)	3:46
2.	"Demanufacture" (from Demanufacture)	4:13
3.	"Self Bias Resistor" (from Demanufacture)	5:12
4.	"Zero Signal" (from Demanufacture)	5:57
5.	"New Breed" (from Demanufacture)	2:49
6.	"Flashpoint" (from Demanufacture)	2:53
7.	"H-K (Hunter-Killer)" (from Demanufacture)	5:17
8.	"Remanufacture" (remixed by Rhys Fulber; from Remanufacture - Cloning Technology)	6:43
9.	"Machines of Hate" (remixed by Rhys Fulber; from Remanufacture - Cloning Technology)	5:50
10.	"Messiah" (from Obsolete expanded)	3:33
Total length:		44:54
