= Dustbowl (album) =

Studio album by Head of David
- Released: 1988
- Recorded: April–May 1987
- Studio: Blackwing Studios, London
- Genre: Industrial rock, post-punk, noise rock
- Length: 48:36
- Label: Blast First
- Producer: Steve Albini

Head of David chronology
The Shit Hits The Fan (1987)	Dustbowl (1988)	White Elephant (1989)

Professional ratings
Review scores
Source	Rating
Allmusic	3/5 stars

Dustbowl is the second studio album by the rock band Head of David. It was released in 1988 through Blast First. It was the last studio album to feature bassist Dave Cochrane and the only release to feature Justin Broadrick on drums. The song "Dog Day Sunrise" was covered by industrial metal band Fear Factory on their 1995 album Demanufacture.

== Track listing ==
All Music and Lyrics by Head of David.

Side one (Rays)
No.	Title	Length
1.	"Tequila"	2:25
2.	"El Supremo"	1:18
3.	"Dog Day Sunrise"	3:59
4.	"Bugged"	2:35
5.	"Great White Heat"	0:49
6.	"Cult of Coats"	4:18
7.	"Ditchwater"	3:46
8.	"108"	5:24

Side two (Shadows)
No.	Title	Length
1.	"Roadkill"	3:58
2.	"Snake Domain"	2:55
3.	"Grand Rift Faultline"	2:20
4.	"Adrenicide"	2:52
5.	"Pierced All Over"	4:31
6.	"Skin Drill"	3:39
7.	"Ink Vine"	3:40

== Personnel ==
=== Band ===
- Dave Cochrane – bass guitar
- Justin K Broadrick – drums
- Eric Jurenovskis – guitars
- Stephen R. Burroughs – vocals

=== Technical staff ===
- Steve Albini – producer
