= Concrete (Fear Factory album) =

2002 demo album by Fear Factory

Studio album (demo) by Fear Factory
- Released: July 30, 2002
- Recorded: 1991
- Genre: Death metal
- Length: 41:44
- Label: Roadrunner
- Producer: Ross Robinson

Fear Factory chronology
Digimortal (2001)	Concrete (2002)	Hatefiles (2003)

Concrete is an album by American industrial metal band Fear Factory, recorded in 1991 but not released until 2002. The first album to be produced by Ross Robinson, it was intended to be Fear Factory's first album; however, it was shelved after the band declined a record contract presented to the band by Robinson. Subsequently, the album was shelved, with Robinson retaining the master tapes and the band retaining the song rights; half of which were re-recorded and released on their 1992 debut album Soul of a New Machine. Robinson sold the master tapes to Roadrunner, who subsequently released the album on July 30, 2002, though the band members have had divided opinions on its release.

== Background ==
Concrete was recorded in one week in 1991 in Blackie Lawless's studios. It was intended to be Fear Factory's first release and the first release on a planned record label run by Robinson. The album was recorded on a $5,000 budget, with the album's costs being cut by Robinson and Dino Cazares sneaking into the studio at night to record guitar and bass, which according to Dino gave the album "a $10,000 sound". However, when the band was presented with record contracts by Robinson, the band was advised to not sign the deal, and subsequently stopped working with him. Robinson then sued the band and took them to court, which Bell jokingly said in 2021 was foreshadowing the entire career of Fear Factory as they would face more lawsuits in later years. Robinson eventually won the rights to the album's master tapes, and the band retained the rights to the songs as well as a DAT tape recording of the album. Both Fear Factory and Robinson used the album to promote themselves, with Fear Factory using the demo to sign to Roadrunner Records and Robinson using the demo to promote his work and attract the attention of local bands, and later of Korn, whom he produced for in 1994, becoming a heavily sought-after nu metal producer throughout the 1990s. Burton C. Bell considers the album to be a demo, and the band subsequently used it to improve their songs.

The band's original bassist, David Gibney, made a spoken word appearance on the track "Big God/Raped Souls". He departed in 1991 and was replaced by Andy Romero. Concrete is the only recording by the band to credit Romero as bassist, despite a line in the liner notes which stated that Cazares recorded bass.

== Songs ==
Eight of the songs on Concrete were re-recorded in 1992 and released on Soul of a New Machine: "Big God/Raped Souls", "Arise Above Oppression", "Crisis", "Escape Confusion", "Dragged Down by the Weight of Existence" (re-recorded as "W.O.E"), "Desecrate", "Suffer Age", and "Self Immolation".

Five of the songs were not re-recorded for Soul of a New Machine, nor re-recorded anywhere else: "Echoes of Innocence", "Deception", "Anxiety", "Piss Christ", and "Ulceration".

The remaining three songs were re-recorded elsewhere: "Concrete" (renamed as "Concreto") was re-recorded in 1995 and was included as a b-side for the "Dog Day Sunrise" single during the Demanufacture era, and was later included on certain editions of the Obsolete album; "Soulwomb" (renamed as "Soulwound") was re-recorded in 1998 and was included as a b-side for the "Resurrection" single, and was later included on certain editions of the Obsolete album; and "Sangre de Niños" ("Children's Blood" in Spanish) was re-recorded in 2010 and was included on certain editions of the Mechanize album.

"Piss Christ" is not the same song as "Pisschrist", which appears on Demanufacture. "Ulceration" is named after the band's original name. The opening guitar riff in "Echoes of Innocence" was used as a synthesized motif in "A Therapy for Pain", the final track on Demanufacture. The title also appears in that song as a lyric.

== Release ==
Professional ratings
Review scores
Source	Rating
AllMusic	4/5 stars
Blogcritics	favorable
Playlouder	2/5 stars
PopMatters	favorable

After its shelving, the Concrete demo was never leaked onto the internet. In 2002, following the band's breakup, Ross Robinson sold the master tapes of Concrete to Roadrunner for $10,000. The album was subsequently released under the name Concrete. The band's opinions on its release have been divided. Dino Cazares was happy about the release; "It's something special for the kids, who never even heard it. They can see where we were coming from. Back then, we were gigging in East L.A. We didn't really have too much recording under our belts. We had recorded a couple of demos before that, but we had never worked with a producer like Ross Robinson." Alternatively, Burton C. Bell was annoyed that Robinson had gone behind the band's back to sell the masters without their consent.

== Track listing ==
No.	Title	Music	Length
1.	"Big God/Raped Souls"	Bell, Cazares, Herrera	2:36
2.	"Arise Above Oppression"	Bell, Cazares, Herrera	1:57
3.	"Concrete"	Bell, Cazares, Herrera	2:28
4.	"Crisis"	Bell, Cazares, Herrera	3:33
5.	"Escape Confusion"	Cazares, Herrera	3:37
6.	"Sangre de Niños"	Bell, Cazares, Herrera	2:03
7.	"Soulwomb"	Bell, Cazares, Herrera	2:35
8.	"Echoes of Innocence"	Bell, Cazares, Herrera	3:04
9.	"Dragged Down by the Weight of Existence"	Bell, Cazares, Herrera	2:42
10.	"Deception"	Bell, Cazares, Herrera	0:29
11.	"Desecrate"	Bell, Cazares, Herrera	2:37
12.	"Suffer Age"	Cazares, Herrera	3:45
13.	"Anxiety"	Bell, Cazares, Herrera	1:39
14.	"Self Immolation"	Bell, Cazares, Herrera	2:34
15.	"Piss Christ"	Bell, Cazares, Herrera	2:41
16.	"Ulceration"	Bell, Cazares, Herrera	2:45
Total length:			41:44

== Credits ==
Writing, performance and production credits are adapted from the album liner notes.

=== Personnel ===
==== Fear Factory ====
- Burton C. Bell − vocals
- Dino Cazares − guitar, bass
- Raymond Herrera − drums
- Andy Romero − bass (Note: Andy Romero was officially credited as the album's bassist in the liner notes and artwork. In addition, the liner notes stated "bass on all tracks by Dino Cazares", despite Romero's credit in the text. A similar situation later occurred with the Soul of a New Machine and Demanufacture albums, where Cazares stated that he played bass, and not the credited bassists (Andrew Shives and Christian Olde Wolbers respectively); however, in those instances, a "bass on all tracks" line was not present in the albums' liner notes.)

==== Additional musicians ====
- Dave Gibney − spoken word intro on "Big God", vocals on "Raped Souls"

==== Production ====
- Ross Robinson − production, engineering, mixing
- Mikey Davis − engineering, mixing
- Eddy Schreyer − mastering

==== Visual art ====
- t42design – art direction, design
- Howard Rosenberg – photography (cover)
- Rick Ferdinande – photography (band)

=== Studios ===
- Blackie Lawless's Fort Apache Studio, Los Angeles, California, US – engineering, mixing
- Oasis Mastering, Los Angeles, California, US – mastering
