= Descent (song) =

Single by Fear Factory

from the album Obsolete
- Released: April 1999
- Genre: Industrial metal, nu metal
- Length: 4:36
- Label: Roadrunner
- Songwriter(s): Burton C. Bell, Dino Cazares, Raymond Herrera, Christian Olde Wolbers

Fear Factory singles chronology
"Resurrection" (1998)	"Descent" (1999)	"Cars" (1999)

"Descent" is a single by American industrial metal band Fear Factory from their album Obsolete. It was the third single released and the fifth track on the album. The music was composed by guitarist Dino Cazares and drummer Raymond Herrera, with lyrics by Burton C. Bell. In the storyline of Obsolete's concept, "Descent" expresses the despair felt by the album's protagonist, the dissident Edgecrusher, as he rests briefly on his flight from the pursuing forces of Securitron. He questions the worth of his personal mission; in the end, he decides to continue his fight against his oppressors.

"Descent" peaked at number 38 on the Billboard Mainstream Rock chart.

== Track listing ==
1. Descent - 4:36
2. Descent (Falling Deeper Mix) - 4:36

"Descent (Falling Deeper Mix)" also appears on the album Hatefiles.

== Radio promo ==
1. Descent (edit) 4:04

== Charts ==
Chart (1999)	Peak position
U.S. Mainstream Rock Tracks	38

== Cover Versions ==
The Finnish/American/Belgian band Meridian Dawn covered the song which appears on their first self release The Mixtape EP
