= Archetype (Fear Factory album) =

Studio album by Fear Factory
- Released: April 20, 2004
- Recorded: December 2003
- Studio: Rumbo Studios (California)
- Genres: Industrial metal; groove metal
- Length: 59:00
- Label: Liquid 8
- Producers: Fear Factory; Rhys Fulber

Fear Factory chronology
Hatefiles (2003)	Archetype (2004)	Transgression (2005)

Singles from Archetype
- 1. "Cyberwaste" Released: March 22, 2004; 2. "Archetype" Released: April 19, 2004; 3. "Bite the Hand That Bleeds" Released: December 7, 2004

Professional ratings
Review scores
Source	Rating
AllMusic	3/5 stars
Brave Words & Bloody Knuckles	9/10
Chronicles of Chaos	8.5/10
Exclaim!	(positive)
laut.de	4/5 stars
Metal.de	9/10
Metal Storm	9/10
Rock Hard	8.5/10

Archetype is the fifth studio album by American industrial metal band Fear Factory. It was the first album by the band not to feature Dino Cazares, with Christian Olde Wolbers handling both bass and guitar duties. It was released on April 20, 2004, through Liquid 8. It debuted at No. 30 on the Billboard 200 chart and is their highest-charting album to date.

The album was also issued in a limited edition digipak with a bonus DVD. Depending on where the digipak was obtained, the bonus DVD is either for their "Australian Tour 2004" and the video for "Cyberwaste" or one entitled "The Making of Archetype". Some, though not all, versions of the bonus digipak also included a gold ticket that gave the owner a chance to meet Fear Factory live.

Christian Olde Wolbers noted the main influences for the record were Slayer's Undisputed Attitude, Rammstein's Mutter and Mnemic's Mechanical Spin Phenomena.

== Track listing ==
All lyrics are written by Burton C. Bell except "School" by Kurt Cobain; all music is composed by Herrera/Wolbers except where noted.

No.	Title	Length
1.	"Slave Labor"	3:53
2.	"Cyberwaste"	3:18
3.	"Act of God"	5:08
4.	"Drones"	5:02
5.	"Archetype"	4:36
6.	"Corporate Cloning"	4:24
7.	"Bite the Hand That Bleeds"	4:09
8.	"Undercurrent"	4:05
9.	"Default Judgement"	5:24
10.	"Bonescraper"	4:12
11.	"Human Shields"	5:16
12.	"Ascension" (Bell/John Bechdel)	7:05
Total length:		56:22

Bonus track
No.	Title	Length
13.	"School" (Nirvana cover; Cobain)	2:38
Total length:		59:00

Bonus track for Japan
No.	Title	Length
14.	"Archetype (Remix)"	4:31

Limited edition bonus DVD
No.	Title	Length
14.	"Australian Tour 2004" (multimedia track)	56:27
15.	"Cyberwaste" (music video)	3:35

== Song interpretations ==
- "Slave Labor" contains references to the self-immolation of a person against the corporate world.
- "Cyberwaste" contains references to anonymous Internet users who antagonize other users only because they are "safe behind the cyberscreen".
- The title track "Archetype" is directed at then ex-guitarist Dino Cazares: "The infection has been removed/The soul of this machine has improved." Frontman Burton C. Bell stated that "'Archetype,' defines what Fear Factory is, completely. It has classic Fear Factory parts, and the heavy/melodic vocals, but without being forced or contrived."

== Popular culture ==
- "Bite the Hand That Bleeds" was used in the film Saw and the music video is a bonus feature on one of the versions of the DVD.
- "Slave Labor" is featured on UFC: Ultimate Beat Downs, Vol. 1.
- The album and its title song are referenced in the game Fallout 3 on one of the terminals, where a certain "B. Bell" reports on a terminal that the virus on the "Archetype FF06" mainframe has been cleaned, and that "the infection has been removed, the soul of this machine has improved".
- A remixed version of the song "Archetype" was featured on the soundtrack to OVA Galerians: Rion.
- The official music video of the song "Archetype" was featured as a bonus unlockable in Capcom's game Final Fight: Streetwise (PS2/Xbox).

== Credits ==
=== Fear Factory ===
- Burton C. Bell − vocals, arrangements ("Transformated")
- Christian Olde Wolbers − guitars, bass, arrangements ("Transformated")
- Raymond Herrera − drums
- Byron Stroud – live bass

=== Additional musicians ===
- John Bechdel − live keyboards, effects ("Additional Devices") (1)
- Rhys Fulber − keyboards, programming, cognitive devices (1, 6, 7, 12, 13)
- Steve Tushar − keyboards, programming, cognitive devices (3–5, 8, 9, 11, 13), augmenting ("Additional Augments") (4, 5)

=== Production ===
- Burton C. Bell − lyrics
- Roger Lian − augmenting
- Shaun Thingvold − augmenting
- Ken "Hi Watt" Marshall − engineering, augmenting
- Jeremy Blair − engineering, augmenting
- Greg Reely − mixing, augmenting
- Mike Catain − executive production, coordination
- Omer "Impson" R. Cordell − photography
- Fear Factory − production, development, visual concept
- Alain Francois − web design
- Torsten Gebhardt − rendering
- Ralph Schrader − coordination, layout design, organizer
- Howie Weinberg − mastering, development

== Charts ==
Album - Billboard (North America)

Year	Chart	Position
2004	Billboard 200	30
2004	Top Independent Albums	2
