= Shock (Fear Factory song) =

Single by Fear Factory

from the album Obsolete
- Released: July 14, 1998
- Genre: Heavy metal, industrial metal, nu metal
- Length: 4:50
- Label: Roadrunner
- Songwriter(s): Burton C. Bell; Dino Cazares; Raymond Herrera; Christian Olde Wolbers
- Producer(s): Rhys Fulber; Greg Reely; Fear Factory

Fear Factory singles chronology
| "Dog Day Sunrise" (1996) | "Shock" (1998) | "Resurrection" (1998) |

"Shock" is a song by American industrial metal band Fear Factory. It was released as the lead single from their third album Obsolete (1998) and is the first track on the album. Its music was composed by guitarist Dino Cazares and drummer Raymond Herrera. The lyrics were written by vocalist Burton C. Bell. The introduction of a concept album, "Shock" introduces its protagonist, a political prisoner known only as Edgecrusher, who declares his personal mission to destroy the totalitarian society in which he lives.

The song was featured in the TV series Angel from season 2 episode 10 "Reunion".

== Track listing ==
| No. | Title | Length |
|---|---|---|
| 1. | "Shock" (Edit) | 4:50 |

== Personnel ==
Fear Factory

- Burton C. Bell – vocals
- Dino Cazares – guitar
- Christian Olde Wolbers – bass
- Raymond Herrera – drums

Additional

- Dino Cazares – mixing
- Rhys Fulber – keyboards, programming, production, mixing
