= Remanufacture – Cloning Technology =

Remanufacture (Cloning Technology)

Remix album by Fear Factory
- Released: May 20, 1997
- Recorded: 1996
- Genres: Industrial metal; electronic; hardcore techno
- Length: 64:25
- Label: Roadrunner
- Producers: Colin Richardson; Dino Cazares; Fear Factory; Greg Reely; Junkie XL

Fear Factory chronology
Demanufacture (1995)	Remanufacture (Cloning Technology) (1997)	Obsolete (1998)

Singles from Remanufacture
- 1. "Burn" Released: 1997

Professional ratings
Review scores
Source	Rating
AllMusic	2.5/5 stars
Collector's Guide to Heavy Metal	3/10

Remanufacture (Cloning Technology) (sometimes referred to as Remanufacture) is the first remix album by American industrial metal band Fear Factory. Released on May 20, 1997 on Roadrunner Records, the album features remixes of tracks from the band's second studio album Demanufacture.

The tracks "Genetic Blueprint" (New Breed) and "21st Century Jesus" (Pisschrist) are featured on Infogrames Test Drive 5 which was released on PC and PlayStation in 1998. Additionally, the song "Remanufacture" (Demanufacture) is featured on the 2000 PC game Messiah, as it is the theme song for the game, and the song is also on 2005 PSP video game Infected.

== Track listing ==
The titles of the original songs are in bigger brackets. All songs composed by Burton C. Bell, Dino Cazares and Raymond Herrera.

No.	Title	Remixed by	Length
1.	"Remanufacture" (Demanufacture)	Rhys Fulber	6:43
2.	"National Panel Beating" (Body Hammer)	Rhys Fulber	4:39
3.	"Genetic Blueprint" (New Breed)	Junkie XL	4:24
4.	"Faithless" (Zero Signal)	Rhys Fulber	5:25
5.	"Bionic Chronic"	Junkie XL	0:33
6.	"Cloning Technology" (Replica)	Kingsize	5:53
7.	"Burn" (Flashpoint)	Junkie XL	5:06
8.	"T-1000" (H-K)	DJ Dano	4:08
9.	"Machines of Hate" (Self Bias Resistor)	Rhys Fulber	5:50
10.	"21st Century Jesus" (Pisschrist)	Rhys Fulber	7:20
11.	"Bound for Forgiveness" (A Therapy For Pain)	Rhys Fulber	6:03
12.	"Refinery"		3:03
13.	"Remanufacture (Edited Version)" (Demanufacture)	Rhys Fulber	5:26
Total length:			1:04:32

=== Japanese Edition Bonus Track ===
No.	Title	Remixed by	Length
14.	"Transgenic" (New Breed)	Technohead	5:42
Total length:			1:10:14

=== Remastered Special Edition (2005) ===
On June 7, 2005, Roadrunner Records released a newly remastered version of Remanufacture (Cloning Technology) as part of the Demanufacture Special Edition. This two-disc digipak set featured the Demanufacture album on Disc 1 and Remanufacture on Disc 2.

Both albums were remastered in March 2005 by Ted Jensen at Sterling Sound in New York City. Issued as part of the Roadrunner Records 25th Anniversary Reissue Series, this "Special Edition" also included ten bonus tracks. Notably, five of these tracks were outtakes from the original Remanufacture mixing sessions, including the previously unreleased "Flashpoint (Chosen Few Mix)."

Disc One
No.	Title	Length
1.	"Demanufacture"	4:13
2.	"Self Bias Resistor"	5:12
3.	"Zero Signal"	5:57
4.	"Replica"	3:57
5.	"New Breed"	2:49
6.	"Dog Day Sunrise" (Head of David cover)	4:46
7.	"Body Hammer"	5:06
8.	"Flashpoint"	2:53
9.	"H-K (Hunter-Killer)"	5:17
10.	"Pisschrist"	5:28
11.	"A Therapy for Pain"	9:43
12.	"Your Mistake" (Agnostic Front cover featuring Freddy Cricien of Madball on guest vocals)	1:30
13.	"¡Resistancia!"	2:55
14.	"Concreto"	3:31
15.	"New Breed (Revolutionary Designed Mix)"	3:00
16.	"Manic Cure"	5:10
17.	"Flashpoint (Chosen Few Mix)" (Remixed by Chosen Few)	4:09
Total length:		1:15:34

Disc Two
No.	Title	Remixed by	Length
1.	"Remanufacture" (Demanufacture)	Rhys Fulber	6:43
2.	"National Panel Beating" (Body Hammer)	Rhys Fulber	4:39
3.	"Genetic Blueprint" (New Breed)	Junkie XL	4:24
4.	"Faithless" (Zero Signal)	Rhys Fulber	5:25
5.	"Bionic Chronic"	Junkie XL	0:33
6.	"Cloning Technology" (Replica)	Kingsize	5:53
7.	"Burn" (Flashpoint)	Junkie XL	5:06
8.	"T-1000" (H-K)	DJ Dano	4:08
9.	"Machines of Hate" (Self Bias Resistor)	Rhys Fulber	5:50
10.	"21st Century Jesus" (Pisschrist)	Rhys Fulber	7:20
11.	"Bound for Forgiveness" (A Therapy For Pain)	Rhys Fulber	6:03
12.	"Refinery"		3:03
13.	"Cyberdyne" (H-K)	Junkie XL	4:29
14.	"Refueled" (H-K)	Junkie XL	4:37
15.	"Transgenic" (New Breed)	Technohead	5:42
16.	"New Breed (Spoetnik Mix)"	Spoetnik	3:52
Total length:			1:17:47

== Personnel ==
=== Fear Factory ===
- Fear Factory – production, cover design
  - Burton C. Bell – vocals
  - Dino Cazares – guitar
  - Christian Olde Wolbers – bass
  - Raymond Herrera – drums

=== Other personal ===
- Dino Cazares – production
- Delwyn Brooks – mixing assistant
- Ciel – artwork, design
- Anne Marie Damjanovic – production coordination
- Rhys Fulber – remixing
- Ted Jensen – mastering
- Junkie XL – producer, remixing
- Kingsize – remixing
- DJ Dano – remixing
- Greg Reely – producer, mixing
- Colin Richardson – producer
- Cristian Wicha – design

== Charts ==
Album - Billboard (United States)

Year	Chart	Position
1997	Heatseekers	6
1997	Billboard 200	158
