= Obsolete (album) =

Studio album by Fear Factory
- Released: July 28, 1998; March 23, 1999 (limited edition digipak)
- Recorded: February 21 – May 10, 1998
- Studios: Mushroom & Armoury (Vancouver)
- Genres: Industrial metal; groove metal; nu metal
- Length: 48:59
- Label: Roadrunner
- Producers: Fear Factory; Rhys Fulber; Greg Reely

Fear Factory chronology
Remanufacture (1997)	Obsolete (1998)	Resurrection (1999)

Fear Factory studio album chronology
Demanufacture (1995)	Obsolete (1998)	Digimortal (2001)

Singles from Obsolete
- 1. "Shock" Released: July 14, 1998; 2. "Resurrection" Released: September 14, 1998; 3. "Descent" Released: April 1999; 4. "Cars" Released: August 31, 1999

Obsolete (styled as °BSΩLE+e) is the third studio album by American industrial metal band Fear Factory, released on July 28, 1998, through Roadrunner Records. It was produced by Fear Factory, Greg Reely and Rhys Fulber, the latter of whom wrote, arranged and performed all of the album's keyboard parts, and was the band's first full album to feature bassist Christian Olde Wolbers, who performed on around half of the tracks of the band's previous album Demanufacture (1995).

Musically, the album saw Fear Factory experiment with their sound, featuring a more "organic" groove than the band's previous album. The band's first fully fledged concept album, Obsolete revolves around a story penned by vocalist Burton C. Bell, "Conception 5", set in the year 2076 where machines have taken over mankind.

With the success of its fourth single, a cover version of "Cars" by Gary Numan, featuring Numan himself on vocals, Obsolete would break Fear Factory into the mainstream and remain their highest selling album.

In 2019, Joe Smith-Engelhardt of Alternative Press included the song "Edgecrusher" in his list of "Top 10 nü-metal staples that still hold up today".

== Background and recording ==
The group began writing and pre-production in late 1997. This came to a sudden halt when Ozzy Osbourne invited Fear Factory to open for the reunited Black Sabbath at two sold-out stadium shows at the Birmingham NEC. Fear Factory also headlined their own concert on December 7 in London. Early versions of “Edgecrusher” and “Smasher/Devourer” were performed at these shows. The band intended to return to work on their album in Los Angeles until late January when they would record in Vancouver with producers Rhys Fulber and Greg Reely. The working title Obsolete was announced during this time although not certain to remain. Production of the album lasted from February 21 to May 10, 1998. Recording lasted four weeks longer than the band planned, forcing them to cancel an appearance at the Dynamo Festival.

In a first, guitarist Dino Cazares used a seven-string guitar tuned down to A for this album. To compensate for this, Olde Wolbers began using a five-string bass. Gary Numan appears at the beginning of "Obsolete" and on the cover of his own 1979 song "Cars".

"Edgecrusher" features Olde Wolbers plays a stand-up bass that was given to him by Biohazard bassist/vocalist Evan Seinfeld. The song's breakdown features hip hop scratching. The latter would prove to be a point of contention not only with purist listeners, but within the band itself: According to Herrera, Olde Wolbers's suggestion to include it was initially met by strong resistance from Cazares, as did a number of other experimental ideas.

The title for "Smasher/Devourer" came from the anime version of A Wind Named Amnesia. Rhys Fulber originally intended Sarah McLachlan to provide additional vocals to "Timelessness".

== Concept and lyrics ==
Obsolete is a concept album. In contrast to Demanufacture, which only featured a loose concept, Obsolete revolves around a story, penned by vocalist Burton C. Bell, titled "Conception 5". Bell wrote "Conception 5" in two weeks. The story was inspired by books including Ira Levin's The Boys from Brazil, Aldous Huxley's Brave New World, George Orwell's 1984, and Arthur C. Clarke's 2001: A Space Odyssey. Bell said that the songs "Descent", "Resurrection", and "Timelessness" were "very personal" to him.

The story of Obsolete is set in the year 2076, where machines have taken over mankind. It was inspired by the band's belief that humanity has become too reliant on technology. Bell explained, "We're up to the point in the story where man is obsolete. Man has created these machines to make his life easier, but in the long run it made him obsolete. The machines he created are now destroying him. Man is not the primary citizen on earth." The world is governed by an organisation known as the "Securitron", who also controls the "Police 2000" and "Smasher/Devourer". The character of Securitron was inspired by the Internet. Cazares said: "Securitron's an actual organization that’s been created by the government for that purpose, to be monitored, so they know every move that you make."

The "Conception 5" story is detailed in its entirety in the album's CD booklet, featuring illustrations by artist Dave McKean. Bell explained the wealth of booklet content:

"That was the only way to totally bring the concept out. When you read the words, you can visualize it in your head. The music helps to augment that. It's like a mini-graphic novel with Dave McKean artwork throughout it and a great story that goes along with the music... The challenge was to make a story out of it. It was kind of difficult to join all of these elements together. But to us, challenge is the greatest thing. Challenge makes us strive for greater ideas and concepts."

=== Scene I ===
With the opening track "Shock", the album's protagonist, Edgecrusher, who is "the revolutionary leader for humans" and the only human character in the story, decides to rebel against society. The tracks "Edgecrusher" and "Smasher/Devourer" formally introduce the characters of Edgecrusher and Smasher/Devourer, with the former representing a rebel against society and the latter representing the existing power structure. From the description given in the album's booklet, the Smasher/Devourer is a large robot with an "egg-like frame" and "its arms are actually weaponry for protection", whilst in an interview with Mixdown Monthly, Cazares described it as "a clean-up man, [and] almost like a terminator" for the Securitron. "Securitron (Police State 2000)" touches on "the reduction in personal privacy brought on by increased technology".

Securitron (Police State 2000)" is the last song of the first scene and the next entity to start chasing Edgecrusher. Edgecrusher is constantly watched by the monitors of Securitron so he descends underground, into the shadows below street level where apparently the refuse is, but he knows that he is safe from incident from any enforcer among the trash. The song is about the police of this dictatorial regime, the Police 2000: how oppressive they are and how they are everywhere not giving any privacy or freedom to citizens. In the end of the scene Edgecrusher is forced to surface and the scene fades out with him running down a deserted street into the night.

=== Scene II ===
"Descent" is the only song of Scene II. Edgecrusher is alone in this song, he has grown tired from running for so long from Smasher/Devourer and the Securitron. He wonders if his mission is worth it, he dwells upon his life, and what it actually amounts to. Edgecrusher stops in an abandoned building to rest himself. As he falls to sleep on a cold, flat floor, he repeats the same words as he does every night; they are the lyrics to this song. As he wakes up and looks to the sky he realizes that his life is worth the effort, so he keeps going.

Burton C. Bell said of the song:

" 'Descent' is about the fall of mankind, but also about my fall. Because I fell into these depth, to where I could not pull myself out. I was the lowest of the low. I had done things, I had lied, cheated, I had just... betrayed most of my friends. And I sunk. I descended into oblivion."

=== Scene III ===
"Hi-Tech Hate" is Obsolete's "most political song", dealing with the buildup of weapons of mass destruction. The song is basically an anti-war, anti-nuclear proclamation from Dino Cazares. It depicts an anti-war protest of factions of various dissensions in front of the Securitron base, a heavily guarded fortress. The lyrics are the words of a man who emerges and speaks to the crowd through a megaphone.

As the man finishes, the Securitron enforcers move in on the crowd. He sees no way out of this situation: true freedom cannot be realized in a scrutinized society. He takes a can of gasoline and pours it on himself. With the match in his fingers, the lyrics of "Freedom or Fire" are his final words. This act of self-immolation is very much like Thích Quảng Đức's. "Obsolete" starts with a spoken intro by Gary Numan. They are the words of a Securitron enforcer who grabs the megaphone after the members of the crowd disperse in order to escape detainment of the enforcers. Of course, the main message of the song is that "man is obsolete" and that "our world [is] obsolete".

Having witnessed the events of these three songs, Edgecrusher begins to think how their humanity disappeared into the darkness, how mechanized they have become. As he eludes the enforcers, he enters a church and finds a statue of Jesus Christ. He has seen this image before. He apparently gains a lot of memories from seeing the statue and extends his arm to touch the face of it. In the song "Resurrection" Edgecrusher swears to continue his mission to save humanity. Bell called "Resurrection" "one of the most human songs on [Obsolete], because it's all about compassion. To me, to revive humanity is to revive compassion for one another." He also said that the song was "very important to me ... That song brought me out of my depression". In a 2026 interview, Bell said that the song's lyrics were inspired by a relationship break-up, specifically, his break-up with Tairrie B.

The scene and album end with "Timelessness". Edgecrusher walks away from the figure and as he glances back, it seems as though it he has been weeping. The Securitron forces capture Edgecrusher in the conclusion. This last song has a very melancholic feel to it. The lyrics are desperate; they are Edgecrusher's words (or probably thoughts) from the jail. We can feel his fear and despair: he lost his battle against machines and failed in saving mankind. Bell said that "Timelessness" is themed around loneliness, and that it was inspired by difficulties in his relationship with Tura Satana/My Ruin vocalist Tairrie B. The opening of the song features audio of Mario Savio giving his famous "Bodies Upon the Gears" speech.

== Release ==
Obsolete was initially released in a standard format in July 1998. Bell explained, "We wanted the album to come as the concept and the whole story. We had the ten songs in a row for it, and "Cars" was never meant to be on the record. We just knew it would either be a single later on or a B-side or an extra track later on somewhere else. Initially it just didn't fit with the concept." "Cars" was not included on the initial release of the album, however a few months after the album's release, a remixed version of "Cars" was issued as a single and began receiving significant airplay on US radio. The song became a hit, but fans could not find the track in stores. As a result, Roadrunner made the decision to tag the remixed version of "Cars" onto the end of Obsolete as the eleventh track for all future pressings. A few other satisfactory songs that did not fit the album's concept, were included on a limited edition digipak released March 1999 in the US. These songs included the Wiseblood cover, "0-0 (Where Evil Dwells)" and "Soulwound" (a re-recording of "Soulwomb" off of the band's demo Concrete). The digipak also contained "Concreto" (another Concrete re-recording), which was recorded at the sessions for the band's previous album, Demanufacture and had been previously released as a B-side in 1995. The final bonus track was "Messiah", a new song recorded for the video game Messiah. (The game's release ended up being repeatedly delayed and it did not hit stores until 2000).

== Touring and promotion ==
Fear Factory joined Rob Zombie and Monster Magnet for a fall 1998 tour. They also began their first headlining US tour with System of a Down, Hed PE, Static-X, and Spineshank in early 1998. The tour ran into tragedy, however, when a rental truck housing all of the band equipment and merchandise was stolen from a hotel parking lot in Philadelphia. This forced several shows to be immediately rescheduled. Three days later, the stolen truck was found near the Walt Whitman Bridge, empty and in flames.

Regarding the theft, Burton C. Bell told MTV, "January 23 was a very dark day in Fear Factory history. Our entire production was in that truck including lights, merchandise, everything. Not only was our entire production in that truck, but also the other two group's who traveled with us. System of a Down, all their stuff got taken with the truck, same with a band called Spineshank, all their equipment as well. So everything, the whole show just drove off." Such problems on Fear Factory's first headlining tour proved demoralizing; however, Bell described the events as somewhat of a "blessing in disguise" as various one-off major city dates that needed rescheduling were expanded into multiple shows heading into mid April.

In a last-minute change, Fear Factory replaced Judas Priest in the Second Stage headlining slot of Ozzfest '99. The tour ran from May through July.

Three singles were released for Obsolete. "Shock" and "Descent" managed to chart but did not endure lasting popularity. Only after the release of "Cars", exclusive to the limited edition digipack version of Obsolete, did Fear Factory gain significant mainstream exposure. This was further aided by the song's music video directed by John S. Bartley.

== Charity auction ==
A gold record of Obsolete was provided to Allbeat.com's charity auction for Death frontman Chuck Schuldiner who was suffering from a brain tumor. The auction faced severe controversy however; while the record sold for $1,000, the buyer never materialized. Other items up for auction, including a guitar signed by Papa Roach and articles from Crazy Town and Slipknot, also did not materialize. A new auction was to be organized, but Schuldiner died on December 13, 2001.

== Reception ==
Professional ratings
Review scores
Source	Rating
AllMusic	4/5 stars
Chronicles of Chaos	5/10
Collector's Guide to Heavy Metal	7/10
Kerrang!	3/5 stars
NME	3/10
Terrorizer	5/5 stars

Largely due to the popularity of the band's rendition of "Cars", which reached No. 57 on the UK charts, Obsolete gained significant commercial success. As of 2002, the album had sold over 406,000+ copies according to SoundScan. It is Fear Factory's best selling album to date and was certified gold in Australia by the ARIA and also in the US by the RIAA.

The album received positive reviews. AllMusic's Greg Prato noted, "Admirably, they've stayed true to their sound over the years, paying no mind to current musical trends - they're content with their original Ministry-meets-Slayer sound." Kerrang! was more mixed, calling it "a disappointingly empty, one-dimensional experience".

== Covers ==
European death metal band Meridian Dawn recorded a version of "Descent" in tribute to the band for their debut 2014 EP The Mixtape.

== Track listing ==
All lyrics are written by Burton C. Bell, except where noted; all music is composed by Dino Cazares, Raymond Herrera, and Christian Olde Wolbers, except where noted.

No.	Title	Lyrics	Music	Length
1.	"Shock"			4:58
2.	"Edgecrusher"	Bell, Madchild		3:39
3.	"Smasher/Devourer"			5:34
4.	"Securitron (Police State 2000)"			5:47
5.	"Descent"			4:36
6.	"Hi-Tech Hate"			4:33
7.	"Freedom or Fire"			5:11
8.	"Obsolete"			3:51
9.	"Resurrection"			6:35
10.	"Timelessness"		Bell, Rhys Fulber	4:08
Total length:				48:59

Various editions with one bonus track
No.	Title	Lyrics	Music	Length
11.	"Cars"	Gary Numan	Numan	3:40
Total length:				52:39

Digipak edition with five bonus tracks
No.	Title	Music	Note	Length
11.	"Cars"	Numan	Gary Numan cover	3:40
12.	"0-0 (Where Evil Dwells)"	J. G. Thirlwell, Roli Mosimann	Wiseblood cover	5:16
13.	"Soulwound"	Dino Cazares, Raymond Herrera, Christian Olde Wolbers, Bell	alternate version of "Soulwomb" from Concrete	3:53
14.	"Messiah"	Cazares, Herrera, Wolbers, Bell	from the Messiah soundtrack	3:33
15.	"Concreto"	Cazares, Herrera, Bell	alternate version of "Concreto" from Concrete and originally released on the "Dog Day Sunrise" single	3:36
Total length:				68:50

== Personnel ==
=== Fear Factory ===
- Burton C. Bell – vocals
- Dino Cazares – guitars
- Christian Olde Wolbers – bass, upright bass (2)
- Raymond Herrera – drums

=== Additional personnel ===
- Rhys Fulber – keyboards and programming, strings arrangements (9, 10)
- DJ Zodiac – technical scratching (2)
- Pat Hoed – intro voice (2)
- Gary Numan – spoken words (8), vocals (11)
- Mark Ferris – strings arrangements (9, 10)

==== Chamber strings (tracks 9 and 10) ====
- Chelsea Devon
- Cleo Ledingham
- Coco Collingwood
- El Feroce
- Falstaff Fallen
- Monty Washington
- Narcissa
- Pepé Lamoco
- Susie Hodge
- Walter Creery

=== Production ===
- Produced by Fear Factory and Rhys Fulber; additional production by Greg Reely
- Recorded by Greg Reely
- Mixed by Rhys Fulber and Greg Reely
- Mastered by Ted Jensen
- Artwork, design and cover concept by Dave McKean
- All songs published by Roadblock Music, Inc./Hatefile Music, except "Timelessness", published by Roadblock Music, Inc./Hatefile Music and Copyright Control.

== Charts ==
Year	Chart	Position
1998	Billboard 200	77

== Certifications ==
Region	Certification	Certified units/sales
Australia (ARIA)	Gold	35,000^{^}
United States (RIAA)	Gold	500,000^{^}
^{^} Shipments figures based on certification alone.
