= Transgression (album) =

Studio album by Fear Factory
- Released: August 22, 2005
- Recorded: 2005
- Genre: Industrial metal
- Length: 56:42
- Label: Calvin Records
- Producers: Toby Wright; Burton C. Bell

Fear Factory chronology
Archetype (2004)	Transgression (2005)	Mechanize (2010)

Singles from Transgression
- 1. "Supernova" Released: 2005; 2. "Moment of Impact" Released: 2005; 3. "Transgression" Released: 2006

Transgression is the sixth album by the American industrial metal band Fear Factory. It was released in the UK on August 22, 2005 through Calvin Records and released in the US and Canada the next day on August 23. Guest appearances include Billy Gould, the bassist of Faith No More, and Lamb of God guitarist Mark Morton, who co-wrote the song "New Promise". The album was released as an enhanced CD with access to the exclusive Fear Factory website. It was also released as an enhanced DualDisc with the DVD side featuring the whole album in (48,000 kHz), music videos and "The Making of Transgression" video. One could also retrieve another bonus track, entitled "My Grave", by putting the CD into the computer and clicking the 'Music' section at the special website.

Transgression is the last album to feature original drummer Raymond Herrera and bassist/guitarist Christian Olde Wolbers who both parted ways with the band in April 2009 after original guitarist Dino Cazares returned to the band. Transgression was the first CD Fear Factory recorded since Soul of a New Machine without Rhys Fulber's input. "Moment of Impact" had a music video which found moderate airplay. The song "Transgression" was used in a scene from the 2007 thriller film Mr. Brooks. This is the first Fear Factory album to include guitar solos, with the songs "Echo of my Scream" and "New Promise" featuring one each.

== Reception ==
Professional ratings
Review scores
Source	Rating
AllMusic	4/5 stars
Blabbermouth.net	7.5/10 stars
Metal Storm	7.8/10

The album was met with mildly positive reviews from critics, but was met with mixed to negative reviews from fans. Many have cited the low point of the album being the poor production and in contrast to the band's previous albums. Additionally, while other albums had a more clean and industrial styled sound, Transgression has a more raw and less polished production style. Guitarist Christian Olde Wolbers has stated that, in previous records, the band would usually work closely with the producer, while this time they had a producer "do everything". This resulted in a mix and sound that Christian was not happy with. He also described how he had to walk out of the studio because he wasn't pleased with his guitar sound.

Wolbers stated that the band was disappointed with the album due to its hurried finish due to demands from the band's label. This also accounts for the cover songs. Had the band had more time to finish the record, more tracks would have been included, and the album overall would have sounded better. Eighteen songs were recorded during the Transgression sessions, with five that have yet to be released. Two of them are "Ammunition" and a cover of Godflesh's "Anthem".

In 2013, Christian Olde Wolbers via his Facebook page revealed more details regarding writing\recording Transgression and Archetype:

We had some really heavy shit on Transgression that never made it to the album because Burt didn't wanna sing on fast blast beat songs. We had over 20 songs. Burt picked the songs he wanted to write too. I helped create and helped write at least 60% of the vocal hooks and melodies on Archetype. I held his hand during the writing and demo process. I wrote the verse in "Cyberwaste", chorus melodies in Archetype, etc... Only "Bonescraper" was done on the spot in the studio. On Transgression I wasn't allowed to interfere with Burt's writing process. It was Burt and Toby. When I heard the first takes I cringed and thought it was demo stage to still find the melodies etc. They told me it was a done deal and to stay out of it. Transgression, I am NOT proud of at all. It's crap. I produced Archetype. Burt produced Transgression with Toby Wright. That is the truth.

In 2016, Metal Hammer named Transgression as Fear Factory's worst album.

== Track listing ==
All lyrics are written by Burton C. Bell, except where noted; all music is composed by Christian Olde Wolbers and Raymond Herrera, except where noted.

No.	Title	Length
1.	"540,000 Degrees Fahrenheit"	4:28
2.	"Transgression"	4:50
3.	"Spinal Compression"	4:12
4.	"Contagion"	4:39
5.	"Empty Vision"	4:55
6.	"Echo of My Scream"	6:58
7.	"Supernova"	4:32
8.	"New Promise" (music: Wolbers, Herrera, Mark Morton)	5:13
9.	"I Will Follow" (U2 cover) (lyrics: Bono; music: U2)	3:42
10.	"Millennium" (Killing Joke cover) (lyrics and music: Jaz Coleman, Martin "Youth" Glover, Kevin "Geordie" Walker)	5:26
11.	"Moment of Impact"	4:03
Total length:		56:45

Exclusive download
No.	Title	Length
12.	"My Grave"	5:36

Bonus tracks for Japan
No.	Title	Length
12.	"Empire"	3:47
13.	"Slave Labor" (live)	4:05
14.	"Cyberwaste" (live)	3:40
15.	"Drones" (live)	4:57

DVD track listing
No.	Title	Length
1.	"540,000 Degrees Fahrenheit"	4:28
2.	"Transgression"	4:50
3.	"Spinal Compression"	4:10
4.	"Contagion"	4:37
5.	"Empty Vision"	4:52
6.	"Echo of My Scream"	6:57
7.	"Supernova"	4:30
8.	"New Promise"	5:12
9.	"I Will Follow" (U2 cover)	3:40
10.	"Millennium" (Killing Joke cover)	5:24
11.	"Moment of Impact"	4:02
12.	"Transgression" (music video)	4:51
13.	"Spinal Compression" (music video)	4:13
14.	"Moment of Impact" (music video)	4:06
15.	"The Making of Transgression: Violation"	5:44
16.	"The Making of Transgression: Corruption"	7:23
17.	"The Making of Transgression: Contention"	7:36

== Credits ==
=== Fear Factory ===
- Burton C. Bell – vocals ("Vox Martyr Automata"), effects ("Comprehensive Supervision"), lyrics ("Lyrical Illumination")
- Christian Olde Wolbers – guitars ("Visceral Pentatonic Resonance"), bass ("Oppressive Bass"), arrangements ("Hypermutation of Musical Arrangements")
- Raymond Herrera – drums ("Systematic Battery"), arrangements ("Hypermutation of Musical Arrangements")
- Byron Stroud – bass ("Intrinsic Low End Convergence")

=== Additional personnel ===
- Burton C. Bell – engineering
- Raymond Herrera – engineering
- Reggie Boyd – assistant production
- Tom Jermann – visual design
- Toby Wright – production, engineering, mixing
- Stephen Marcussen – mastering
- James Musshorn – assistant engineering
- Matt Prine – editing, visual direction
- Shaun Thingvold – engineering
- Chad Michael Ward – still pictures
- Ben Templesmith – cover artwork
- Steve Tushar – engineering, design, effects ("Design Strategies For Spectral Ambience")
- Paul Lawler – sound design ("Additional Textured Compensation") (4 & 6)
- Billy Gould – bass (Special Bass Enhancement) (6 & 7)
- Russell Ali – additional guitar (7)

== Charts ==
Chart (2005)	Position
US	45
US Indie	6
ARIA Charts	26
AUT	44
BEL	74
FIN	38
FRA	87
GER	37
NLD	54
SWE	56
UK	77
