= Dog Day Sunrise =

1988 song by Head of David

"Dog Day Sunrise" is a song by British rock band Head of David, released in 1988 as the third track on their second studio album, Dustbowl.

== Fear Factory version ==
"Dog Day Sunrise"

Single by Fear Factory

from the album Demanufacture
- Released: February 22, 1996
- Recorded: 7 October–20 November 1994
- Studio: Bearsville Studios (Woodstock, New York)
- Genre: Industrial metal
- Length: 2:47 (single); 4:45 (album)
- Label: Roadrunner
- Songwriter: Head of David
- Producers: Colin Richardson, Rhys Fulber

Fear Factory singles chronology
"Replica" (1995)	"Dog Day Sunrise" (1996)	"Burn" (1997)

"Dog Day Sunrise" was covered by American industrial metal band Fear Factory on their second studio album, Demanufacture (1995). It was released as the second and final single from the album on February 22, 1996.

The song reached No. 85 on the UK singles chart, but did not chart anywhere in the US.

=== Track listing ===
No.	Title	Length
1.	"Dog Day Sunrise" (Edit)	2:47
2.	"Replica (Electric Sheep Mix)"	4:00
3.	"Concreto"	3:30
4.	"Dog Day Sunrise" (LP)	4:47
Total length:		15:04
