= Soul of a New Machine =

Studio album by Fear Factory
- Released: August 25, 1992
- Recorded: May 1992
- Studios: Grand Master, Ltd. (Hollywood)
- Genres: Death metal; industrial metal; alternative metal
- Length: 55:14
- Label: Roadrunner
- Producer: Colin Richardson

Fear Factory chronology
Soul of a New Machine (1992)	Fear Is the Mindkiller (1993)

Fear Factory studio album chronology
Soul of a New Machine (1992)	Demanufacture (1995)

Soul of a New Machine is the debut studio album by American industrial metal band Fear Factory, released on August 25, 1992, by Roadrunner Records. Although it was Fear Factory's first album to be released, it was actually their second album recorded. The earlier demo album, Concrete was recorded in 1991 but not released until 11 years later. Soul of a New Machine introduced the era of alternative metal, and has been described as a combination of death metal and industrial metal with other elements such as grindcore.

Soul of a New Machine was remastered and re-released on October 5, 2004, in a digipak, together with the remastered Fear Is the Mindkiller EP.

== Overview ==
Guitarist Dino Cazares has stated that Soul of a New Machine is a concept album, concerning man's creation of a machine that could be either technological or governmental. Bassist Christian Olde Wolbers described it the same way.

Jason Birchmeier of AllMusic described the album as ushering in the alternative metal era of the 1990s. Soul of a New Machine has also been described as death metal and industrial metal with elements of grindcore. Author Colin Larkin of The Encyclopedia of Popular Music wrote "Soul of a New Machine established Fear Factory as a genuine death metal force, with a good collection of songs delivered with originality and ferocity."

The record featured a different conceptual style from Fear Factory's later works. "Martyr" is about someone who dies for a cause; "Leechmaster" is about relationship problems; "Scapegoat" was based on how Cazares was once wrongfully accused by the law; "Crisis" is an anti-war song; "Crash Test" concerns animal testing and "Suffer Age" is based on serial killer John Wayne Gacy. The other songs contain different themes. Samples from the movies Full Metal Jacket, Blade Runner, and Apocalypse Now are heard sporadically throughout the album.

== Reception ==
Professional ratings
Review scores
Source	Rating
AllMusic	3/5 stars
Collector's Guide to Heavy Metal	8/10
Rock Hard	8.5/10

AllMusic's Jason Birchmeier remarked that "Fear Factory were quite ahead of their time in 1992". The critic also noted the diversity of the genres featured in the recording, saying that "Soul of a New Machine was so groundbreaking because it [fused] together some of the best aspects of numerous metal subgenres", which "[resulted] in a unique sound".

Rock Hard rated the album highly, saying that the sound of the album was strange, indescribable yet required listening. Rock Hard also complimented the blending of various sub-genres, with particular note to Burton Bell for managing such an eclectic set of vocals.

- Kerrang! (p. 61) - "[The album] contains all the unrefined qualities that would soon make Fear Factory legendary."

== Track listing ==
All lyrics are written by Burton C. Bell except where noted; all music is composed by Dino Cazares and Raymond Herrera.

No.	Title	Length
1.	"Martyr"	4:06
2.	"Leechmaster"	3:54
3.	"Scapegoat"	4:33
4.	"Crisis"	3:45
5.	"Crash Test"	3:46
6.	"Flesh Hold"	2:31
7.	"Lifeblind"	3:51
8.	"Scumgrief"	4:07
9.	"Natividad"	1:04
10.	"Big God/Raped Souls"	2:38
11.	"Arise Above Oppression"	1:51
12.	"Self Immolation"	2:46
13.	"Suffer Age"	3:40
14.	"W.O.E."	2:33
15.	"Desecrate"	2:35
16.	"Escape Confusion"	3:58
17.	"Manipulation"	3:29
Total length:		55:14

== Credits ==
=== Fear Factory ===
- Burton C. Bell – vocals (credited as "Dry Lung Vocal Martyr"), programming (credited as "Hardware, Utilities"), lyrics, intro programming (10)
- Dino Cazares – guitars (credited as "Discordant"), bass, arrangements
- Raymond Herrera – drums (credited as "Variable Percussive Wrecking")
- Andrew Shives – live bass (credited as "Discordant Bass") (Note: Andrew Shives was officially credited as the album's bassist in the liner notes and artwork. Years later, Dino Cazares stated that he himself (and not Shives) played all of the bass parts on the album. Burton C. Bell also corroborated Cazares' claims, although in that particular interview, Bell also claimed that Shives' replacement (Christian Olde Wolbers) did not play on the subsequent Demanufacture album, which was disputed by numerous others. Shives has not publicly commented on his role in the band since then.)

=== Additional personnel ===
- Colin Richardson – production, mixing, add. performer (9)
- Steve Harris – engineering, mixing
- Bradley Cook – assistant engineering
- Rober Fayer – assistant engineering, add. performer (9)
- Eddy Schreyer – mastering
- Ted Jensen – remastering (Expanded Edition)
- Satok Lrak, Karl Kotas (spelled backwards) – computer graphics, art direction
- Joe Lance – photography
- Lora Porter – executive production, add. performer (9)
- Otis – sampling (credited as "Sample God"),
- Darius Seponlou – introduction (5), intro programming (5)
- Monte Conner – A&R
