= Linchpin (song) =

2001 single by Fear Factory

Single by Fear Factory

from the album Digimortal
- Released: 2001
- Recorded: 2000
- Genre: Nu metal
- Length: 3:24
- Label: Roadrunner
- Songwriters: Burton C. Bell; Dino Cazares; Raymond Herrera; Christian Olde Wolbers
- Producers: Rhys Fulber; Fear Factory

Fear Factory singles chronology
"Cars" (1999)	"Linchpin" (2001)	"Invisible Wounds (Dark Bodies)" (2001)

"Linchpin" is a song by American industrial metal band Fear Factory. The song was released as the first single from their fourth studio album, Digimortal (2001). It peaked at No. 31 on the Billboard Mainstream Rock chart.

The Linchpin EP was released on April 2, 2002, exclusively in Australia.

== Music video ==
The music video shows shots of machinery and what appears to be a polygraph machine intercut with footage of individual band members playing while at times being surrounded by smoke or doused in a white liquid. A picture of the Vitruvian Man, along with a rendition of Fear Factory's logo can be seen briefly at the end of the video superimposed over lead singer Burton C. Bell. The video was directed by Thomas Mignone. Although the song has a "Radio Edit" version which omits the pre-chorus, the video contains the LP version.

== Track listing ==
Enhanced single
No.	Title	Length
1.	"Linchpin"	3:25
2.	"Frequency"	3:02
3.	"Machine Debaser" (Instrumental)	4:15
4.	"Linchpin" (Music Video)	3:34

American promo single
No.	Title	Length
1.	"Linchpin" (LP Version)	3:24
2.	"Linchpin" (Radio Edit)	3:01
3.	"Burton C. Bell Linchpin ID"	0:08
4.	"Dino Cazares Linchpin ID"	0:07
5.	"Burton C. Bell Generic ID"	0:07
6.	"Dino Cazares Generic ID"	0:04
7.	"Dino Cazares Alternate Linchpin ID with Beeps"	0:10
8.	"Dino Cazaers X-Rated ID"	0:10

=== Australian tour EP ===
No.	Title	Length
1.	"Frequency"	3:02
2.	"Linchpin"	3:24
3.	"Machine Debaser" (Instrumental)	4:16
4.	"Demolition Racer"	0:51
5.	"Invisible Wounds" (The Suture Mix)	3:36
6.	"Replica" (Live)	4:00
7.	"Edgecrusher" (Live)	3:44

Note

- Track 6 was recorded at the Desert Sky Pavilion in Phoenix, Arizona on October 25, 1996. Track 7 was recorded at the Palace in St. Kilda, Melbourne on February 26, 1999.

Enhanced content
No.	Title	Length
1.	"Linchpin" (Music Video)	3:34
2.	"History"	5:04
3.	"The Band"	7:26
4.	"Digimortal"	5:04
5.	"Digimortal 2"	4:04

Note

- Videos 2 to 5 make up the documentary The Making of Digimortal, directed by Doug Spangenberg.

== Personnel ==
Fear Factory

- Burton C. Bell – vocals
- Dino Cazares – guitar
- Christian Olde Wolbers – bass
- Raymond Herrera – drums

Additional

- Rhys Fulber – keyboards, programming, production

== Charts ==
Chart (2001)	Peak position
US Mainstream Rock (Billboard)	31
UK Singles Chart (OCC)	85
