= Resurrection (Fear Factory EP) =

EP by Fear Factory
- Released: September 14, 1998
- Recorded: 1998
- Genre: Industrial metal; alternative metal; nu metal
- Length: 13:43
- Label: Roadrunner
- Producer: Fear Factory

Fear Factory chronology
Obsolete (1998)	Resurrection (1998)	Messiah (1999)

Fear Factory singles chronology
"Shock" (1998)	"Resurrection" (1998)	"Descent" (1999)

Resurrection is the fourth EP by American industrial metal band Fear Factory. It was released on September 14, 1998.

== Song information ==
"Resurrection" is one of singer Burton C. Bell's favorite Fear Factory songs. It is the ninth and longest track on the 1998 concept album Obsolete. The album version runs 6:35. The song highlights the thoughts of the album's protagonist, the dissident Edgecrusher, as he flees the oppressing forces of Securitron. Having witnessed an act of self-immolation during a protest and the subsequent dispersal of the crowd by armed forces, Edgecrusher flees to a church where he discovers a statue of Jesus, which he touches, giving him the courage to continue his personal mission against the government.

The Allmusic review of Obsolete said, "The album's biggest surprise however is 'Resurrection,' which is perhaps the most tuneful song Fear Factory have ever done, without compromising their heavy sound."

== US track listing ==
No.	Title	Note	Length
1.	"Resurrection"	edit	4:32
2.	"0-0 (Where Evil Dwells)"	From the album Dirtdish by Wiseblood cover	5:16
3.	"Soulwound"		3:55

== Japanese track listing ==
No.	Title	Note	Length
1.	"Resurrection"		4:31
2.	"Cars"	From the Album The Pleasure Principle by "Gary Numan" cover	3:41
3.	"Messiah"		3:33
4.	"Concreto"		3:36

== Credits ==
=== Fear Factory ===
- Burton C. Bell − vocals
- Dino Cazares − guitar
- Christian Olde Wolbers − bass
- Raymond Herrera − drums

== Charts ==
Chart (1998)	Peak position
Australia (ARIA Charts)	89
UK Rock & Metal (OCC)	1
