= Demanufacture (album) =

Studio album by Fear Factory
- Released: June 13, 1995
- Recorded: October 7 – November 20, 1994
- Studios: Bearsville, Woodstock (New York)
- Genres: Industrial metal; groove metal; death metal
- Length: 55:12
- Label: Roadrunner
- Producers: Colin Richardson; Rhys Fulber; Fear Factory

Fear Factory chronology
Fear Is the Mindkiller (1993)	Demanufacture (1995)	Remanufacture – Cloning Technology (1997)

Fear Factory studio album chronology
Soul of a New Machine (1992)	Demanufacture (1995)	Obsolete (1998)

Singles from Demanufacture
- 1. "Replica" Released: May 12, 1995; 2. "Dog Day Sunrise" Released: February 22, 1996

Demanufacture is the second studio album by American industrial metal band Fear Factory, released on June 13, 1995, by Roadrunner Records. It is the band's first album with their classic line-up, adding new bassist Christian Olde Wolbers, who performed on close to half of the album's tracks, with guitarist Dino Cazares handling the rest. Many regard it as the band's best album and a heavy metal classic. The album was certified Gold in Australia by ARIA and Silver in the UK by the BPI.

== Album information ==
Demanufacture is a concept album about a man's struggles against a machine-controlled government, with each song a chapter in his life. The band stated the album took its inspiration from the movie The Terminator.

The album was recorded at Bearsville Studios in rural New York. Also in residence at the studio was Bon Jovi, recording their album These Days. Fear Factory were in the studio next door and one of Bon Jovi's engineers asked them to turn the sound down, as it was bleeding into Bon Jovi's drum mics, during Bon Jovi's recording sessions.

After the release of the album, some critics and observers suggested that drummer Raymond Herrera had in fact used a drum machine, due to the often blistering speed and machine-like precision of the drumming, most notably on the kick drums. He records, however, with a click track to keep time. He is also known to use triggers on his drum sets for the purpose of keeping the sound of his drums consistent, particularly kick drums, regardless of how hard they are struck. This is a common strategy used by metal drummers when playing at such speeds, as relatively few drummers are able to achieve such rapid and consistent notes without the use of triggers.

=== Involvement of Christian Olde Wolbers ===
Although Christian Olde Wolbers is credited as the bassist for the album and appears in the band photo, Dino Cazares has repeatedly claimed to have played bass himself on all tracks; because Olde Wolbers was not in the band during recording but joined before the album's release and promotional tour. However, this is contradicted by former drummer Raymond Hererra who has said that Olde Wolbers was a full member during production but did not perform on all tracks, due to Cazares re-arranging many riffs during tracking of his guitars. The band were behind schedule with recording and Olde Wolbers did not have time to learn the new arrangements so Cazares recorded bass on these tracks. In a 1998 interview with Terrorizer (with the whole band present), Olde Wolbers states that Cazares performed "45 to 50 percent of the bass" on Demanufacture. Olde Wolbers later mentioned in an interview in 2004 that he made a small contribution to the writing of the title track and "Pisschrist".

== Reception ==
Professional ratings
Review scores
Source	Rating
AllMusic	4/5 stars
Collector's Guide to Heavy Metal	9/10
Metalitalia (IT)	9/10
Truemetal.it (IT)	93%
GBHBL	8/10
Metalfan (NL)	92%
Metal1 (DE)	10/10

Upon its release, Demanufacture proved to be extraordinarily successful and received universal acclaim from both music critics and extreme metal fans. It is often regarded as the band's best album. Andrew Kapper of About.com named Demanufacture as the recommended album to listen to by the band, and stated in his review:

"Quite rightly regarded as one of the finest metal releases to come out in the last 25 years, Demanufacture was a game changer in the metal world. Backed with a mechanical assault of machine gun drum work and guitar riffs, Burton C. Bell's groundbreaking extreme to clean vocals take the center stage, with enormous hooks covering tracks like 'Replica', 'Zero Signal' and the title track, while keyboard and synths create both harsh and lush counterpoints across the record. A classic LP that deserves to be in any serious metalhead's collection."

"Replica" was covered by Dutch symphonic metal band Epica in 2007 as part of a "deluxe re-release" of the album The Divine Conspiracy, and was performed live by them at the Whisky a Go Go in Hollywood, California, with Dino Cazares joining on stage in September 2007. "Flashpoint" was covered as a one-man effort by American metal artist Common Dead in 2012 as a standalone single. "Pisschrist" was covered by American heavy metal band Byzantine in 2016 as part of their re-release of their 2015 album To Release Is to Resolve for the European region.

== Legacy ==
Tracks 1 to 4 were featured on 2006's The Best of Fear Factory.

In July 2013, the band toured Australia performing Demanufacture in its entirety.

In celebration of the 20 year anniversary of Demanufacture in 2015, Fear Factory embarked on a tour across Europe and North America playing the album.

== Track listing ==
All music by Dino Cazares and Raymond Herrera except where noted; All lyrics by Burton C. Bell except where noted

No.	Title	Lyrics	Music	Length
1.	"Demanufacture"		Cazares, Herrera, Olde-Wolbers	4:12
2.	"Self Bias Resistor"		Cazares, Herrera, Bell	5:12
3.	"Zero Signal"			5:57
4.	"Replica"			4:01
5.	"New Breed"	Bell, Cazares		2:49
6.	"Dog Day Sunrise" (Head of David cover)	Cochrane, Jurenovskis, Broadrick, Burroughs	Cochrane, Jurenovskis, Broadrick, Burroughs	4:45
7.	"Body Hammer"			5:05
8.	"Flashpoint"			2:53
9.	"H-K (Hunter-Killer)"			5:17
10.	"Pisschrist"		Cazares, Herrera, Olde-Wolbers	5:25
11.	"A Therapy for Pain"			9:43
Total length:				55:12

Limited Edition Digipak (Europe & Australia)
No.	Title	Lyrics	Music	Length
12.	"Your Mistake" (Agnostic Front cover)	Roger Miret	Miret (Guest vocals by Freddy Cricien of Madball)	1:29
13.	"¡Resistancia!"			2:54
14.	"New Breed" (Revolutionary Designed Mix)	Bell, Cazares		2:59
Total length:				1:02:45

Limited Edition Digipak (USA & Canada)
No.	Title	Length
15.	"Replica" (Electric Sheep Mix)	3:58
Total length:		1:06:44

=== Remastered Special Edition (2005) ===
All lyrics are written by Burton C. Bell except where noted; all music is composed by Dino Cazares & Raymond Herrera except where noted.

Disc 1
No.	Title	Lyrics	Music	Length
12.	"Your Mistake" (Agnostic Front cover)	Miret	Miret	1:30
13.	"¡Resistancia!"			2:55
14.	"Concreto"			3:30
15.	"New Breed" (Revolutionary Designed Mix)	Bell, Cazares		2:59
16.	"Manic Cure"			5:09
17.	"Flashpoint" (Chosen Few Mix)			4:09
Total length:				1:15:30

On June 7, 2005, a newly remastered, "special edition" of Demanufacture was issued in an all-new, 2-Disc digipak. Demanufacture (Special Edition) was released as part of the Roadrunner Records 25th Anniversary Reissue Series.

Disc 1 included the remastered, Demanufacture album, along with bonus tracks, mostly from the Demanufacture sessions.

Disc 2 included the remastered, Remanufacture – Cloning Technology album, along with bonus tracks from the Remanufacture remix sessions.

Disc 1 Notes:

▪︎Remastered by Ted Jensen at Sterling Sound, NYC - March 2005

▪︎Bonus tracks 12–15 were recorded and mixed as part of the Demanufacture sessions

▪︎One other song from the Demanufacture sessions, "Replica (Electric Sheep Mix)", was not included due to space limitations, but it was previously available on the (US & Canadian) digipak version of Demanufacture

▪︎Bonus Track 17 is an out-take from the Remanufacture remix sessions

▪︎Bonus Track 16 is not an out-take - it was created independently of the Remanufacture album

== Personnel ==
=== Fear Factory ===
- Burton C. Bell (credited as "Dry Lung Vocal Martyr") – vocals, arrangements, additional keyboards, lyrics
- Dino Cazares (credited as "Heavy Duty Scarifier") – guitars, bass
- Raymond Herrera (credited as "Maximum Effective Pulse Generator") – drums
- Christian Olde Wolbers (credited as "Total Harmonic Distortion") – bass

=== Additional musicians ===
- Reynor Diego – live keyboards, sampling, add. keyboards
- Rhys Fulber – keyboards, synthesizers, sampling, effects, mixing
- Freddy Cricien – guest vocals on "Your Mistake"

=== Additional personnel ===
- Colin Richardson – production
- Dave McKean – cover artwork
- Greg Reely – mixing
- George Marino – mastering
- Ted Jensen – remastering (2005 Special Edition)

== Charts ==
Album Chart	Peak
U.S. Billboard Top Heatseekers	26
Dutch Album Charts	53
German Album Charts	31
UK Albums Chart	27

== Release history ==
Region	Date	Format	Label
UK	March 3, 1995	CD	Roadrunner Records
World	June 13, 1995	CD	Roadrunner Records
World except Australia and parts of Canada	November 7, 1995	CD	Roadrunner Records
World	2003	CD	Roadrunner Records
World	June 7, 2005	CD	Roadrunner Records
