= Cars (song) =

1979 single by Gary Numan

Single by Gary Numan

from the album The Pleasure Principle
- B-side: "Asylum"; "Metal"
- Released: 24 August 1979
- Recorded: 1979
- Studio: Marcus Music AB, London
- Genre: Synth-pop; new wave; electronica; post-punk
- Length: 3:45
- Label: Beggars Banquet
- Songwriter: Gary Numan
- Producer: Gary Numan

Gary Numan singles chronology
"Cars" (1979)	"Complex" (1979)

Audio sample
- file; help

Music video
- "Cars" on YouTube

"Cars" is the first solo single by the English musician Gary Numan. It was released on 24 August 1979 and is from his debut studio album The Pleasure Principle. The song reached the top of the charts in several countries, and is Numan's most successful single.

== Overview ==
The song was the first release credited solely to Gary Numan after he dropped the band name Tubeway Army, under which he had released four singles and two LPs, including the number one UK hit "Are 'Friends' Electric?", and its parent album Replicas. Musically, the new song was somewhat lighter and more pop-oriented than its predecessors, and Numan later said that he had chart success in mind: "This was the first time I had written a song with the intention of 'maybe it could be a hit single'; I was writing this before 'Are "Friends" Electric?' happened." He has since described "Cars" as "a pretty average song".

In the UK charts, it reached number 1 in 1979, and in 1980, it hit number 1 in Canada two weeks running on the RPM national singles chart (29 weeks in the top 100), his only single to chart there. The single was first issued in the US in February 1980, where it peaked at #4 on the Cash Box Top 100 and #9 on the US Billboard Hot 100 on June 7, 1980, remaining at that position for three weeks. Although Numan had a string of hits in the UK, "Cars" was his only song in the American pop charts. Remixed versions of the song again reached the top 20 in the UK in 1987 and 1996 respectively.

== Composition ==
"Cars" is based on two musical sections: a verse/instrumental break and a bridge. The recording features a conventional rock rhythm section of bass guitar and drums, but the rest of the instruments used are analogue synthesisers, principally the Minimoog (augmenting the song's recognisable bass riff) and the Polymoog keyboard, providing austere synthetic string lines over the bass riff. The bridge section also includes a tambourine part. Numan's vocal part is sung in an almost expressionless, synthesized style. There is no "chorus" as such, and no more lyrics after the 1:30 point.

According to Numan, the song's lyrics were inspired by an incident of road rage:

I was in traffic in London once and had a problem with some people in front. They tried to beat me up and get me out of the car. I locked the doors and eventually drove up on the pavement and got away from them. It's kind of to do with that. It explains how you can feel safe inside a car in the modern world...When you're in it, your whole mentality is different...It's like your own little personal empire with four wheels on it.

Numan later said that the entire song was written in 30 minutes, originating in the bass riff, which was the first thing he played on a newly bought bass guitar.

== Release and promotion ==
The original UK single was released in August 1979, backed with a non-album instrumental track called "Asylum". The US B-side was "Metal", from The Pleasure Principle. The track has been a UK Top 20 hit for Numan in three successive decades: on its original release in 1979 (reaching number 1), in 1987 as the 'E Reg Model' remix (reaching number 16), and in 1996 following its use in an advertisement for Carling Premier beer (reaching number 17). Numan has performed the song onstage since its original release, and it appears on all but one of his official live albums to date.

The music video featured Numan's then-current backing band, including Billy Currie from the band Ultravox, but he had not played on the recording of "Cars".

== Critical reception ==
Upon its release in 1979, Smash Hits reviewer Steve Bush wrote: "With its distant haunting message of doom, "Cars" doesn't stray very far from the themes of the excellent 'Replicas" album, although the new lyrics are shorter and the vocals sharper. The instrumental B side is a rip-off of Bowie's "Warsawa", with mad, tinkling piano. All in all, this is a disappointing follow up to "Friends"". Garry Bushell in Sounds was sceptical of both Numan and the single, yet adds, "Jimmy Pursey tells me this will be number one. He's probably right."

Retrospectively, "Cars" has been called "one of the greatest singles in pop history". Writing for The Guardian in 2012, George Chesterton found "the force of the multi-layered Moog synthesiser parts is almost overwhelming. Using effects usually associated with heavy guitars – reverb, flanging and phasers – Numan drenched the gliding synth lines so they flow over you like wave after wave of ice water. These build throughout the song until the fantastical 1'30" fadeout, during which the Polymoogs – used as elements of a string section – are folded on top of each other in hypnotic harmonies that reinforce the song's sense of eerie dystopia." Chesterton also noted that the song, unlike many similar contemporaries, had aged well lyrically: "Cars contains a bit of futurology that was rather sophisticated. Numan positions the car not as a mode of mechanical transport, but as a fetishised, abstract interface with the rest of the world. This is – in a pop form – what the French philosopher Jean Baudrillard had been writing about a few years earlier. To be fair to Numan, this notion of the car in relation to individuals and society has only deepened in the decades since."

== Track listing ==
1. "Cars" (Numan) – 3:44
2. "Asylum" (Numan) – 2:30

=== US version ===
1. "Cars" – 3:57
2. "Metal" (Numan) – 3:31

== Personnel ==
- Gary Numan – vocals, production, keyboards (Minimoog, Polymoog), synthetic percussion
- Paul Gardiner – bass
- Chris Payne – keyboards (Minimoog, Polymoog)
- Cedric Sharpley – drums, tambourine

== Chart performance ==
=== Weekly charts ===
Chart (1979–1980)	Peak position
Australia (Kent Music Report)	9
Belgium (VRT Top 30 Flanders)	28
Canada (RPM 100 Singles)	1
Germany (GfK)	45
Ireland (IRMA)	5
New Zealand (Recorded Music NZ)	18
UK (Official Charts Company)	1
US Billboard Hot 100	9
US Billboard Hot Dance Club Play	56

Chart (1987)^{1}	Peak position
Ireland (IRMA)	23
UK (Official Charts Company)	16

Chart (1993)^{2}	Peak position
UK (Official Charts Company)	53

Chart (1996)^{2}	Peak position
UK (Official Charts Company)	17

- ^{1}Cars (E Reg Model) / Are 'Friends' Electric ? (Re-mix)
- ^{2}Cars (2nd remix)

=== Year-end charts ===
Chart (1979)	Rank
UK	17

Chart (1980)	Rank
Australia (Kent Music Report)	73
Canada	5
U.S. Billboard Hot 100	12

== Certifications ==
Region	Certification	Certified units/sales
Canada (Music Canada)	Gold	40,000^{‡}
United Kingdom (BPI)	Gold	500,000^{^}
^{^} Shipments figures based on certification alone.^{‡} Sales+streaming figures based on certification alone.

== Live versions and remixes ==
A selected list of Numan's official live recordings and remixes.

- Living Ornaments '79 (1981) – live recording
- White Noise (1985) – live recording also released on The Live EP
- "Cars (E Reg Model)" (1987) – remix released as a 7"/12" single (including two other 1987 mixes) and on compilation album Exhibition
- Ghost (1987) – live recording
- The Peel Sessions Volume 2 (1987) – an EP containing a 1979 live in-studio recording for John Peel's BBC Radio 1 show
- The Skin Mechanic (1989) – live recording
- "Cars ('93 Sprint)" (1993) – remix released on an EP including two 1987 mixes and three other 1993 mixes, and on compilation album The Best of Gary Numan 1978–1983
- Dream Corrosion (1994) – live recording
- "Cars (Premier Mix)" (1996) – reissued/rebadged 1987 remix released as a single and on compilation album The Premier Hits
- Living Ornaments '81 (1998) – live recording
- The Mix (1998) – three remixes ("Spahn Ranch mix", "Talla 2xlc mix" and "JLAB mix")
- Scarred (2002) – live recording
- Hybrid (2003) – remix
- Live at Shepherd's Bush Empire (2004) – live recording
- Living Ornaments '80 (2005) – reissued/expanded live recording originally released minus "Cars" in 1981

Numan performed "Cars" using a set of two dozen automobiles and their horns in an innovative 2010 commercial for DieHard. All of the cars were powered from one single battery. James Frost of Zoo Films directed the video, and Synn Labs, which had previously worked with the band OK Go, engineered the cars.

== Fear Factory version ==
"Cars"

Single by Fear Factory featuring Gary Numan

from the album Obsolete (Expanded)
- Released: 31 August 1999
- Recorded: Early 1998 in Vancouver, British Columbia, Canada
- Genre: Nu metal
- Length: 3:37
- Label: Roadrunner
- Songwriter: Gary Numan
- Producers: Fear Factory, Rhys Fulber

Fear Factory singles chronology
"Descent" (1999)	"Cars" (1999)	"Linchpin" (2001)

Gary Numan singles chronology
"Dominion Day" (1998)	"Cars" (1999)	"Rip" (2002)

Music video
- "Cars" on YouTube

Fear Factory, an American industrial metal band, recorded a version of "Cars" and released it as the second single from their album Obsolete. The song was only included as a bonus track on the limited edition digipak re-release of Obsolete and would be instrumental in breaking Fear Factory into the mainstream. In their rendition, Gary Numan performs a duet with frontman Burton C. Bell.

=== Background and recording ===
According to Bell, around 1996, the band started performing "Cars" as an encore at European concerts. Word spread that Fear Factory was performing the song, and as a result, Gary Numan's manager contacted them. Upon request, Numan's management flew him out to the Vancouver studio for a three-day span to record vocals on "Cars." The band also asked Numan to record a spoken word piece for the introduction of the song Obsolete.

Numan had a long-standing dislike for being associated with what he perceived as dated music, and this initially made him apprehensive of working with Fear Factory until realizing "there was a chance that it could introduce me to a new generation of people who didn't know my history. And that can be useful, because my music's got a lot heavier and darker anyway." The result would be satisfactory for both parties, and Numan praised the band as "brilliant, really easy to work with. They didn't have a bad word to say about anyone."

The uncharacteristically bouncy and bright rendition somewhat contrasts with Fear Factory's reputation for intense, grinding metal, while the heavy use of synthesizer and other electronic elements corresponds with the band's industrial style. Drummer Raymond Herrera described the cover as "basically like a blueprint of a futuristic car." He added that, while other songs were considered, the band chose "Cars" because all the band members knew and appreciated it and because the keyboards suited Fear Factory's sound. Herrera later noted that the group initially wanted to record U2's "New Year's Day" but chose "Cars" because they were fortunate enough to have Numan participate. Fear Factory later covered the U2 song "I Will Follow," in 2005.

=== Reception ===
"Cars" played a significant part in Obsolete's status as Fear Factory's highest-selling album. By 2001, it had sold over 750,000 copies. According to Herrera, the cover received greater enthusiasm in the UK than in the band's native US, which was validated by its chart status. During the song's promotion, Gary Numan joined the band for a concert performance in Brixton, London to much enthusiasm.

After the radio trade publication R&R listed "Cars" as the most added track on both active rock and mainstream rock in May 1999, the song earned "Breaker" status and continued to surge up the chart. "Cars" debuted and peaked at number 57 in the UK Singles Chart on 9 October.

It peaked at No. 16 on the Billboard Mainstream Rock chart and No. 38 on Modern Rock Tracks.

The song was featured as the main theme for Test Drive 6, a video game released in 1999 for the PlayStation and Dreamcast consoles.

=== Music video ===
Numan also appears in the sci-fi music video, directed by John S. Bartley and filmed in Vancouver, which debuted in June 1999. Bell enthusiastically described the ambitious video as having a "Stanley Kubrick-type of vibe to it":

[Bartley] put Gary and me into harnesses and we had to simulate floating in space. We were floating around this junked out '79 Trans Am that he had as this car in space, and we're coming up to it. They had another '70 Trans Am that was turned into a spaceship, and that's what we're driving in. It was just wicked. It was unbelievable. It was like a dream come true.

According to Bell, at one point during the shoot, Numan remarked, "Odd; the song is about cars – why are we in space?"

=== Track listing ===
1. "Cars" (remix) – 3:39
2. "Descent" (Falling Deeper Mix) – 4:38
3. "Edgecrusher" (Urban Assault Mix) – 4:33

=== Charts ===
Chart (1998)	Peak positions
U.S. Mainstream Rock Chart	16
U.S. Alternative Songs	38

Chart (1999)	Peak position
Australia (ARIA Charts)	89
Canada (RPM Rock Report)	13

== Other appearances ==
In 2009, Chicane sampled "Cars" in "Hiding All the Stars", which reached No. 42 in the UK and No. 23 in Belgium.

Toronto-based alternative rock quartet Sloan performed a version of the song in June 2011 for The A.V. Club's A.V. Undercover series.

== Bibliography ==
- Paul Goodwin (2004). Electric Pioneer: An Armchair Guide to Gary Numan
