= Fear Factory =

American industrial metal band

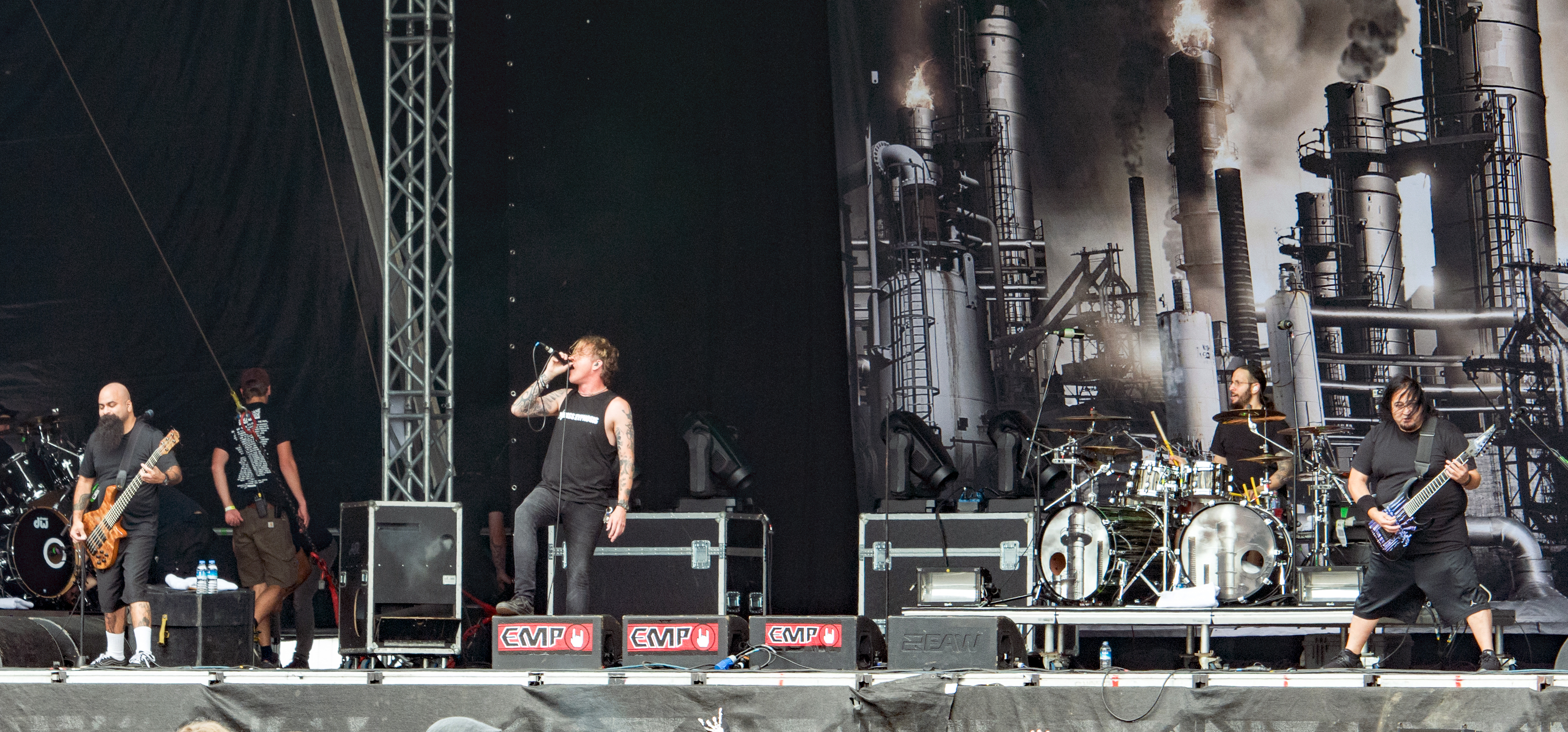
- Fear Factory at Elbriot 2016

Background information
- Also known as: Ulceration (1989–1990); Fear the Factory (1990)
- Origin: Los Angeles, California, U.S.
- Genres: Industrial metal; groove metal; death metal (early)
- Works: Discography
- Years active: 1989–2002; 2003–2006; 2009–present
- Labels: Roadrunner; Liquid 8; Calvin; Candlelight; Nuclear Blast
- Members: Dino Cazares; Tony Campos; Milo Silvestro; Pete Webber
- Past members: Burton C. Bell; David Gibney; Andy Romero; Andrew Shives; Raymond Herrera; Christian Olde Wolbers; Byron Stroud; Gene Hoglan; Matt DeVries; Mike Heller
- Website: fearfactory.com

Fear Factory is an American industrial metal band formed in Los Angeles in 1989. It has released ten full-length albums and evolved through a succession of sounds, all in its main style of industrial metal. Over the years, the band has undergone frequent changes in its lineup. Lead vocalist Burton C. Bell was the only consistent member for 31 years until his departure in 2020. Guitarist Dino Cazares is the only remaining original member in Fear Factory's current lineup, after a seven-year sabbatical from the band between 2002 and 2009. The current lineup of Fear Factory consists of Cazares, bassist Tony Campos, vocalist Milo Silvestro and drummer Pete Webber.

Signing to Roadrunner Records in 1991, Fear Factory released their debut album, Soul of a New Machine, the following year. It became an underground success and earned the band a following through touring. After cycling through a few member changes, the "classic" lineup was formed in 1994, with Bell, Cazares and founding drummer Raymond Herrera joined by bassist Christian Olde Wolbers. This lineup recorded three albums, including the breakthroughs Demanufacture (1995) and Obsolete (1998). Both albums, along with worldwide tours, established Fear Factory's reputation as one of the most acclaimed metal bands of the mid-to-late 1990s. The fourth album, and last recorded with the "classic" lineup, Digimortal (2001), failed to match the success of its predecessors.

In March 2002, Fear Factory broke up due to internal disputes, but reformed the following year, with Wolbers replacing Cazares on guitar and Byron Stroud on bass. Two more albums, Archetype (2004) and Transgression (2005), were released before the band went back on hiatus in 2006. Fear Factory reunited in 2009 with a new lineup that featured Cazares, Gene Hoglan replacing Herrera, and Bell and Stroud reprising their respective roles. This lineup recorded the band's seventh studio album, Mechanize (2010). Wolbers and Herrera, comprising 50% of the band's legal ownership, disputed the reunited band's legitimacy, and a legal battle began. In spite of this, Fear Factory has since released three more albums: The Industrialist (2012), Genexus (2015), and Aggression Continuum (2021).

Fear Factory has performed at Ozzfest four times and the inaugural Gigantour. Its singles have charted on the US Mainstream Rock Top 40 and albums on the Billboard Top 40, 100, and 200. It has sold more than a million albums in the U.S. alone.

== History ==
=== Early years and Concrete (1989–1991) ===
Fear Factory was formed in 1989 as Ulceration, which the band agreed would "just be a cool name". In 1990, they adopted the name Fear the Factory. The name was inspired by a factory that the band supposedly saw near their rehearsal space, which was guarded by men carrying rifles. Later, they shortened the name to Fear Factory.

The band originated in an outfit formed by guitarist Dino Cazares, formerly of The Douche Lords, and drummer Raymond Herrera in Los Angeles, California. Their first lineup was completed with bassist Dave Gibney and vocalist Burton C. Bell (ex-Hate Face), who was allegedly recruited by an impressed Cazares, who overheard him singing "New Year's Day" by U2. Cazares played bass on the first three Fear Factory albums Concrete, Soul of a New Machine and Demanufacture, on which he changed many of the riffs during the recording.

Fear Factory's earliest demo recordings are reminiscent of the early works of Napalm Death and Godflesh, an acknowledged influence of the band in the grindcore-driven approach of the former and the mechanical brutality, bleakness, and vocals of the latter. According to Brian Russ of The BNR Metal Pages, the demos are remarkable for integrating these influences into the band's death metal sound and for Burton C. Bell's pioneering the fusion of extreme death growls and clean vocals in the same song, which became an influential element of the band's sound. The use of grunts and "throat singing" combined with clean vocals later defined nu metal and other emerging subgenres of metal. Many vocalists in today's metal scene use two or more methods of singing and vocalizing lyrics. The band contributed two songs to the L.A. Death Metal Compilation in 1990. The band played its first show on October 31, 1990.

In 1991, Fear Factory recorded a series of tracks with producer Ross Robinson in Blackie Lawless's studio. Afterward, the band members were unhappy with the terms of their recording contract and refused to sign. The band retained the rights to the songs, many of which they re-recorded in 1992 with a different producer, Colin Richardson, for inclusion on their debut release Soul of a New Machine. Robinson obtained the rights to the recording, which he used to promote himself as a producer. The album was released in 2002 by Roadrunner Records under the title Concrete after the band's breakup. The release was controversial because the album was issued without the approval of Fear Factory. Robinson sued the band, which Bell jokingly said in 2021 that it foreshadowed "the entire career of Fear Factory." Concrete is viewed by the band as a demo; a developmental step toward Soul of a New Machine.

=== Soul of a New Machine (1992–1994) ===
Fear Factory shipped the Concrete demo to various labels and was rejected by a number of metal record labels, such as Metal Blade, Earache, Nuclear Blast, and Peaceville Records. After presenting the demo to then-Sepultura lead vocalist Max Cavalera, he recommended Fear Factory to A&R representative Monte Conner of Roadrunner Records, which offered the band a contract. While the band signed the contract, it has since become controversial because of Roadrunner's treatment of the band during the events surrounding its 2002 breakup. This was reflected in the first album, Archetype (2004), released following the band's reformation. The opening song, with lyrics by Burton C. Bell, "Slave Labor", was direct about the band's feelings on the matter. After working with numerous bassists, Andrew Shives was hired as a live bassist prior to the release of Soul of a New Machine.

Released in 1992, Soul of a New Machine, recorded with producer Colin Richardson, gave the band greater exposure in the music scene. The album anticipates the mixing of metal genres that would be called alternative metal. The production combined Bell's harsh and melodic vocals, Herrera's machine-like drums, the integrated industrial samples and textures, and Cazares's sharp, down-tuned, rhythmic, death metal riffs. Cazares and Herrera wrote all the music. Because the band had no bass player, Cazares played guitar and bass on the record. Jason Birchmeier of AllMusic called the album "groundbreaking" and said that "it ushered in the '90s alternative metal era".

To promote the album, Fear Factory embarked on extensive U.S. tours with Biohazard, Sepultura, and Sick of It All. During this period, sampler-keyboardist Reynor Diego joined the group. An album tour of Europe with Brutal Truth, then Cannibal Corpse, Cathedral, and Sleep, followed. The next year, they hired Front Line Assembly member Rhys Fulber to remix some songs from the album, demonstrating the band's willingness to experiment. The results took on an industrial guise, and were released as the Fear Is the Mindkiller EP (1993). Soul of a New Machine and Fear is the Mindkiller were released (2004) as a package in a new re-mastered reissue by Roadrunner Records.

In 1994, Andrew Shives left the band. Cazares recorded the guitar and bass for the album. In November the same year, the band met Belgian Christian Olde Wolbers through Evan Seinfeld of Biohazard. Wolbers auditioned to be Fear Factory's permanent bassist. Wolbers joined the band immediately since the band's tour was starting in two weeks.

=== Demanufacture and Remanufacture (1995–1997) ===
Fear Factory's second album, Demanufacture, was released on June 12, 1995. Generally considered the band's defining work, it transitions away from death metal and grindcore to groove metal, characterized by rapid-fire thrash and industrial metal guitar riffs, tight, pulse driven drum beats, and roaring (rather than growled, but still aggressive) vocals that made way for melodic singing and powerful bass lines. The album's production is more refined and the integration of atmospheric keyboard parts and industrial textures upon Cazares's and Herrera's precise musicianship made the songs sound clinical, cold and machine-like and gave the band's music a futuristic feel. There were extensive contributions from Reynor Diego as well; adding key samples, loops and electronic flourishes to the group dynamics.

Demanufacture was awarded the maximum five-star rating in the UK's Kerrang! rock magazine, and went on to become a fairly successful album; whereas Soul of a New Machine failed to chart anywhere. Demanufacture made the Top 10 of the Billboard Heatseekers charts and a video was produced for the song "Replica". The video was featured in the Test Drive 5 video game for the PlayStation. The song "Zero Signal" was featured on the Mortal Kombat film soundtrack (1995). Instrumental versions of the title track, "Body Hammer" and "Zero Signal" were later used in PC video game Carmageddon.

The same year, Burton C. Bell provided lead vocals on Plastic Planet, the debut studio album by the American alternative metal band g//z/r, founded by and named after Black Sabbath bassist Geezer Butler. Fear Factory spent the next few years touring with heavy metal bands such as Black Sabbath, Megadeth and Iron Maiden, and opened for Ozzy Osbourne in North America and Europe during late 1995. They went on their first headlining European tour in mid-1996, with Manhole and Drain S.T.H. playing in clubs and music festivals, such as With Full Force, Wâldrock or Graspop Metal Meeting. They also appeared at the Ozzfest in 1996 and 1997. In early 1997, they participated at the Big Day Out festival in Australia and New Zealand.

In May 1997, the band released a new album composed of Demanufacture remixes by artists such as Rhys Fulber, DJ Dano and Junkie XL called Remanufacture - Cloning Technology. This was the band's first appearance on the Billboard 200. The tracks "Genetic Blueprint" (New Breed) and "21st Century Jesus" (Pisschrist) are featured on Infogrames Test Drive 5 which was released on PC and PlayStation in 1998. Additionally, the song "Remanufacture (Demanufacture)" is featured on the 2000 PC game Messiah, as it is the theme song for the game, and the song is also on 2005 PSP video game Infected. Roadrunner Records bundled the two albums together in a 10th Anniversary package, released in 2005, which is similar to that of Soul of a New Machine (2004). This edition also includes bonus tracks from the digipak version of Demanufacture (1995).

=== Obsolete (1998–2000) ===
Fear Factory's third studio album, Obsolete (July 1998), was reportedly completed earlier than planned by canceling an appearance at the Dynamo Open Air Festival.

Obsolete was similar in sound to Demanufacture, emphasizing progressive metal elements. For the first time, the album featured Christian Olde Wolbers writing and recording full time with the band. It also featured Cazares' debut use of 7-string Ibanez guitars tuned to A tuning (A, D, G, C, F, A, D), and paved the way for a lower-tuned sound than previously. The album is also notable for Rhys Fulber's increased involvement with the band.

While Fear Factory had explored the theme of "Man versus Machine" in their earlier work, Obsolete was their first concept album that dealt specifically with a literal interpretation of this subject. It tells a story called Conception 5, which was written by Bell, that takes place in a future world where mankind is rendered "obsolete" by machines. Its characters include the "Edgecrusher", "Smasher/Devourer", and the "Securitron" monitoring system. The story is presented in the lyrics booklet in a screenplay format between the individual songs. The printed story parts link the lyrics of the songs together thematically.

Obsolete was released during the alternative metal boom of the late 1990s. It was supported by tours with Slayer and later Rammstein, and a headlining spot on the second stage at Ozzfest in 1999 as last-minute replacements for Judas Priest. They also toured in Europe in December 1998 with Spineshank and Kilgore, and went on their first headlining tour in North America with Static-X the next year, though the first leg was interrupted due to the band's tour bus and material being stolen. They also played in Japan for the first time. Obsolete became the band's highest selling album, marking the band's first entry into the Top 100 on the Billboard charts. The album also spawned singles "Descent" and a digipak bonus track, "Cars", a cover of the Gary Numan song featuring a guest appearance by Numan on the song. The single made the Mainstream Rock Top 40 in 1999 and was also featured in the video game, Test Drive 6. Numan also performed a spoken-word sample on the album's title track. A video was filmed for the song "Resurrection". To date, Obsolete remains the only Fear Factory album to have achieved gold sales in the U.S.

=== Digimortal and demise (2001–2002) ===
In early 2001, Fear Factory was asked to headline SnoCore Rock. The success of Obsolete and "Cars" was a turning point for the band; Roadrunner Records was now keen on capitalizing on the band's sales potential and pressured the band to record more accessible material for the follow-up album, titled Digimortal, which was released in April 2001. Few weeks before its release, they were touring in Europe with One Minute Silence.

They went on a long headlining North American tour during 2001, then played in much larger European festivals like Bizarre Festival, Pukkelpop, Lowlands Festival and Leeds & Reading Festival. They then went on the first Roadrunner Roadrage tour in North America, toured Europe with Devin Townsend and Godflesh and played in Japan, Australia and New Zealand.

Digimortal made the Top 40 on the Billboard album charts, the Top 20 in Canada and the Top 10 of the Australian album charts. The track "Linchpin" reached the Mainstream Rock Top 40. A remix of "Invisible Wounds" was included on the Resident Evil film soundtrack, and an instrumental digipak bonus track called "Full Metal Contact" was originally written for the video game, Demolition Racer. A VHS/DVD release called Digital Connectivity, which documents each of the four album periods of the band via interviews, live clips, music videos and tour/studio footage, was released in January 2002.

Although Digimortal had a successful start, the sales did not reach the levels of Obsolete and the band received little tour support. The direction of the album coupled with strong personal differences between some of the band members created a rift that escalated to the point where Bell announced his exit in March 2002. The band disbanded immediately thereafter; its publicists said this was "largely because vocalist Burton C. Bell is tired of playing angry, aggressive music and wants to form a band that's more indie-rock-oriented". In a final collaboration, the group recorded two songs for the video game The Terminator: Dawn of Fate that month. Fear Factory's contractual obligations remained unfulfilled, however, and Roadrunner did not release them without controversially issuing the Concrete album in 2002 and the B-sides and rarities compilation, Hatefiles, in 2003. During his time away from Fear Factory, Bell with John Bechdel started a side project called Ascension of the Watchers, which released its first EP, Iconoclast, independently via their online store in 2005.

=== First return and Archetype (2002–2004) ===
When you look up the definition of the word, Archetype, it's the actual model from which everything else is copied. Fear Factory is that in my opinion, and Archetype is a defining moment for us. Listen to this record, and you'll know exactly where all these other bands came from.

— Burton C. Bell

Over time, tensions within the band developed between Dino Cazares and the other members, particularly Burton C. Bell and Raymond Herrera. When asked about the breakup in May 2002, Cazares made claims and allegations against Bell and the other members, stating that Fear Factory could continue without Christian Olde Wolbers and that he and Raymond Herrera were primarily motivated by money. Herrera responded to these allegations on behalf of the other band members, saying that Cazares was motivated by money and emphasizing Olde Wolbers' influence on the band's sound. According to Herrera, the other band members would often come up with new ideas they wanted to incorporate into Fear Factory's sound, but their suggestions were dismissed or openly ridiculed by Cazares, causing a rift between him and the other members that ultimately led to the band's breakup. In the same interview, Herrera also revealed that Cazares had attempted to control the direction of the band by manipulating their business management and record company, and had openly lied to the other members about his actions.

Herrera and Olde Wolbers reunited later in 2002 and laid the foundations for the return of Fear Factory. Cazares was then permanently out of the band. Bell was approached with their demo recordings and was impressed enough to rejoin the band and Fear Factory was re-formed. Olde Wolbers switched to guitar and Byron Stroud of Strapping Young Lad was approached to join the band as a bassist. He was a member from 2003 until 2012. The bassist would also be in a side project with Bell called City OF Fire. Cazares continued recording and performing with his side project called Asesino, a Mexican deathgrind band. In 2007, he also started a new group called Divine Heresy.

Fear Factory made its live return as the mystery band at the Australian Big Day Out festival in January 2004, followed by its first American shows since re-forming on the spring Jägermeister tour with Slipknot and Chimaira. The new lineup's first album Archetype was released on April 20, 2004, through new record label Liquid 8 Records based in Minnesota. With Archetype, Fear Factory returned to an alternative, industrial, metal sound; the album is generally considered to be a strong 'return-to-form' record, if not a particularly innovative effort, with most of the trademark elements of the band firmly in place.

Videos were shot for the songs "Cyberwaste", "Archetype", and "Bite the Hand That Bleeds"; the latter featured on the Saw film soundtrack. The band performed on further tours with Lamb of God and Mastodon in the US and with Mnemic in Europe. The new Fear Factory has largely abandoned the direct "Man versus Machine" theme prevalent on earlier releases in favor of subjects such as religion, war, and corporatism.

=== Transgression (2005–2006) ===
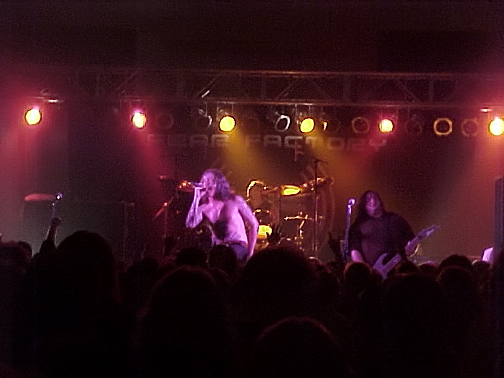
Fear Factory in 2001

Fear Factory announced plans to record and release its next full-length album over a very short period of time with mainstream rock producer Toby Wright, who had worked with Korn and Alice in Chains. This was allegedly due to pressure from Fear Factory's new label Calvin Records, which preponed the album's release date from four months away to just a month and a half so the band would have a new album to support on the inaugural Gigantour, which they had been invited to participate on by Dave Mustaine.

The resulting album, Transgression, was released on August 22, 2005, in the United Kingdom, and on the following day in North America, almost a year after Archetype. The album garnered highly polarized reviews; some critics hailed the album as diverse and progressive, and other reviewers did not receive the record very well. Although the album starts off as a Fear Factory record, subsequent songs include mellow/alt-rock numbers "Echo of My Scream" (featuring Faith No More's Billy Gould on bass) and "New Promise", a pop-rock-adjacent song "Supernova", and a faithful cover of U2's rock song "I Will Follow".

In 2013, Wolbers posted more details about writing and recording of Transgression and Archetype on his Facebook page. He said he was disappointed with Transgression, calling it half-finished, and blamed the label for the severe time constraints imposed during the recording sessions and for the inclusion of the U2 cover. However, Burton C. Bell said he is proud of the album and sees it as the band "stepping over boundaries". In 2015 however, in an interview with Nuclear Blast Records, Bell called Transgression, a "failed experiment".

Late in 2005, Fear Factory toured the U.S. again on the "Machines at War" tour, with an all-star death metal lineup of guests in Suffocation, Hypocrisy, and Decapitated; they played old classics from Soul of a New Machine, such as "Crash Test", which they had not performed live in many years. During 2005 and 2006, Fear Factory promoted the album on the "Fifteen Years of Fear" world tour in celebration of their fifteenth anniversary. The members invited bands including Darkane, Strapping Young Lad and Soilwork to join them on the U.S. leg, and Misery Index to join them on the European leg.

=== Hiatus and other projects (2006–2008) ===
An online statement from Wolbers in December 2006 said the band would return to the studio to record a new album, produced by the band, immediately after the completion of the Transgression touring cycle. That month, Bell confirmed in an interview that the band would leave Liquid 8 Records.

Rather than begin work on a new studio album, the band members briefly parted and began working with other projects. Bell contributed vocals to the songs "End of Days, Pt.1", "End of Days, Pt. 2", and "Die in a Crash" on Ministry's 2007 album The Last Sucker, and later toured with Ministry in support of the album. In an interview for the website Metalsucks, Bell called this a "dream come true", describing Ministry frontman Al Jourgensen as "one of [his] heroes". In the same interview, Bell talked at length about his new band Ascension of the Watchers, providing insight into the inspiration behind the project's formation.

On March 21, 2008, while Fear Factory was on hiatus, Bell spoke in a video interview about the band's future, saying he no longer wanted to contribute to the violence and aggression he saw in the world with the aggressive type of music Fear Factory produced. Wolbers and Herrera started a new band called Arkaea, with vocalist Jon Howard and bassist Pat Kavanagh of Threat Signal. Wolbers said, "Ironically, half of the Arkaea album consists of songs that were intended to be the next Fear Factory record". Arkaea's debut album Years in the Darkness was released on July 14, 2009.

=== Second return, internal disputes, and Mechanize (2009–2011) ===
Fear Factory in 2010

On April 8, 2009, Bell and Cazares announced the reconciliation of their friendship, and the formation of a new project with Byron Stroud on bass and drummer Gene Hoglan of Testament, Death, Strapping Young Lad, Dark Angel, and Dethklok. On April 28, this project was announced to be a new version of Fear Factory without Herrera and Wolbers. When asked about their exclusion, Bell said, "[Fear Factory is] like a business and I'm just reorganizing ... We won't talk about [their exclusion]". Hoglan in retrospect has expressed some hesitation joining the band, saying that he only did it as a favour for Stroud.

In June 2009, Herrera and Wolbers spoke about the issue on the radio program Speed Freaks. Herrera said he and Wolbers were still in the band. "[Christian and I] are actually still in Fear Factory ... [Burton and Dino] decided to start a new band, and furthermore, they decided to call it Fear Factory. They never communicated with us about it", said Herrera. Herrera also said the four original members—Bell, Cazares, Herrera, and Wolbers—were contractually regarded as Fear Factory Incorporated, and, "it's almost like them two against us two, so it's kind of a stalemate". The drummer also said he and Wolbers had written eight songs for the next Fear Factory record, but that a "personal disagreement" had arisen between them and Bell, which left Bell not wanting to continue work with the band.

Bell and Cazares later spoke about their reasons for excluding Herrera and Wolbers. Cazares said Bell wanted to reunite the classic Fear Factory lineup of himself, Cazares, Herrera, and Wolbers, but that Herrera and Wolbers refused to be part of any reunion with Cazares. Bell also said he wanted to fire the band's manager Christy Priske, who was also Wolbers' wife, and Herrera and Wolbers refused. Herrera and Wolbers threatened to sign a new record deal without Bell, prompting him to form a new version of Fear Factory without them. In some interviews, Wolbers said Bell had made "growing unacceptable demands", which were declined. He said, "Ray and I wanted what was best for the business and what he [Burton] was trying to change wasn't really good for the business. It was only bad for the business, so that's why he went into that whole phase of hijacking the name and trying to run with it."

Fear Factory featuring Bell and Cazares was due to make its live debut on June 21 at the Metalway Festival in Zaragoza, Spain. However, the show was canceled "at the last minute", apparently because of the legal complications referenced by Herrera. The rest of that lineup's planned performances in mid-2009, which included a tour of the United Kingdom, Germany, Australia, and New Zealand that August, had also been canceled. The group said they canceled the tour to finish writing and recording the next Fear Factory album. Despite the canceled performances in Europe, they performed some shows in December in South American countries including Argentina, Chile, and Brazil.

During an interview on June 23, 2009, Cazares said he could never have a working relationship with Herrera and Wolbers again, saying they were too money-driven and criticized the music they recorded on Archetype for being too similar to the band's earlier output. Despite ongoing issues between the two parties, the new Fear Factory went ahead with the recording process. In late July 2009, a short video shot with a cell telephone showed Cazares recording drum tracks with longtime contributor Rhys Fulber. On November 6, 2009, blabbermouth.net said a new album, Mechanize, would be released on February 9, 2010, on Candlelight Records. On November 8, 2009, Fear Factory released a track titled "Powershifter" on YouTube. On November 10, 2009, Bell announced the track list for Mechanize, along with an explanation of each song.

In January 2010, Fear Factory played in Australia and New Zealand tour on the Big Day Out tour, playing their first Australian dates since 2005 on January 17 at Parklands Showgrounds on Queensland's Gold Coast. Fear Factory released Mechanize on February 5, 2010, and began a U.S. tour titled "Fear Campaign Tour 2010", in late March. In August 2010, the band headlined the Brutal Assault open air festival in Czech Republic. In September 2010, Fear Factory toured Australia, New Zealand, and Tokyo as the opening act for Metallica. The New Zealand concerts were in Christchurch, two shows that were brought about by a petition sent to Metallica asking them to visit New Zealand's second-largest city. After the 2010 Canterbury earthquake, the South Island concerts were in doubt, but on September 15, 2010, an official announced the CBS Arena had escaped harm and both shows went ahead.

=== The Industrialist (2011–2013) ===
In an interview during the 70000 Tons of Metal cruise, Bell said Fear Factory was planning to write and record a "full-on concept" album, which was due for release in 2012. He said, "We're gonna kind of take a break a little bit, but we're definitely going into the studio at some point and start writing. We wanna take our time doing it. Personally ... Mechanize, don't get me wrong, is a good record—I'm very proud of it—but it's gotta be better than that. I've got plans where I'd like to do a full-on concept again—story, artwork. Just make it real cerebral. But there'll definitely be another Fear Factory record, maybe in 2012." On August 3, 2011, Dino Cazares said on his Twitter feed that he was working and demoing new material for the next Fear Factory album. On January 25, 2012, the band announced the new album will be titled The Industrialist. The album was again co-produced by the band with Rhys Fulber and mixed by Greg Reely.

Byron Stroud left the band early in 2012, saying, "Life's too short to spend it with people who don't respect you". In one interview, Cazares said he did not know why Stroud decided to leave and that he could not play the bass parts on Mechanize, prompting Cazares to do it himself.

In February 2012, former Chimaira guitar player Matt DeVries replaced Stroud. On April 19, 2012, Mike Heller of Malignancy and System Divide was announced as the band's new drummer, replacing Gene Hoglan; in a 2013 interview, Hoglan claimed that he only found out through Blabbermouth.net that he was no longer needed, and expressed some disappointment about the course of events. At the same time, Cazares confirmed on his Facebook page that John Sankey of Devolved had programmed the drums on The Industrialist. Burton described The Industrialist as another concept album "sonically, conceptually, and lyrically". Cazares also said he and Burton were the two in control of the record's outcome, and that the songwriting on the album was much more "definitive" in regards to Fear Factory's platform sound. On June 4, 2012,The Industrialist was available to stream through AOL Music. The album was released through Candlelight Records on June 5, 2012.

On May 2, 2013, Cazares commented regarding the status of Fear Factory albums Archetype and Transgression, which were recorded without his participation, and the band's decision not to play songs from them live, saying "they don't count" as Fear Factory albums. Contradicting this, Fear Factory played the track "Archetype" on its 2013 Australian tour in early July, with minor changes to the song's lyrics; as of 2023, the band continues to play songs from the album, with Cazares saying "The fans want it, and I got used to playing it, so it's all good."

=== Genexus (2013–2015) ===
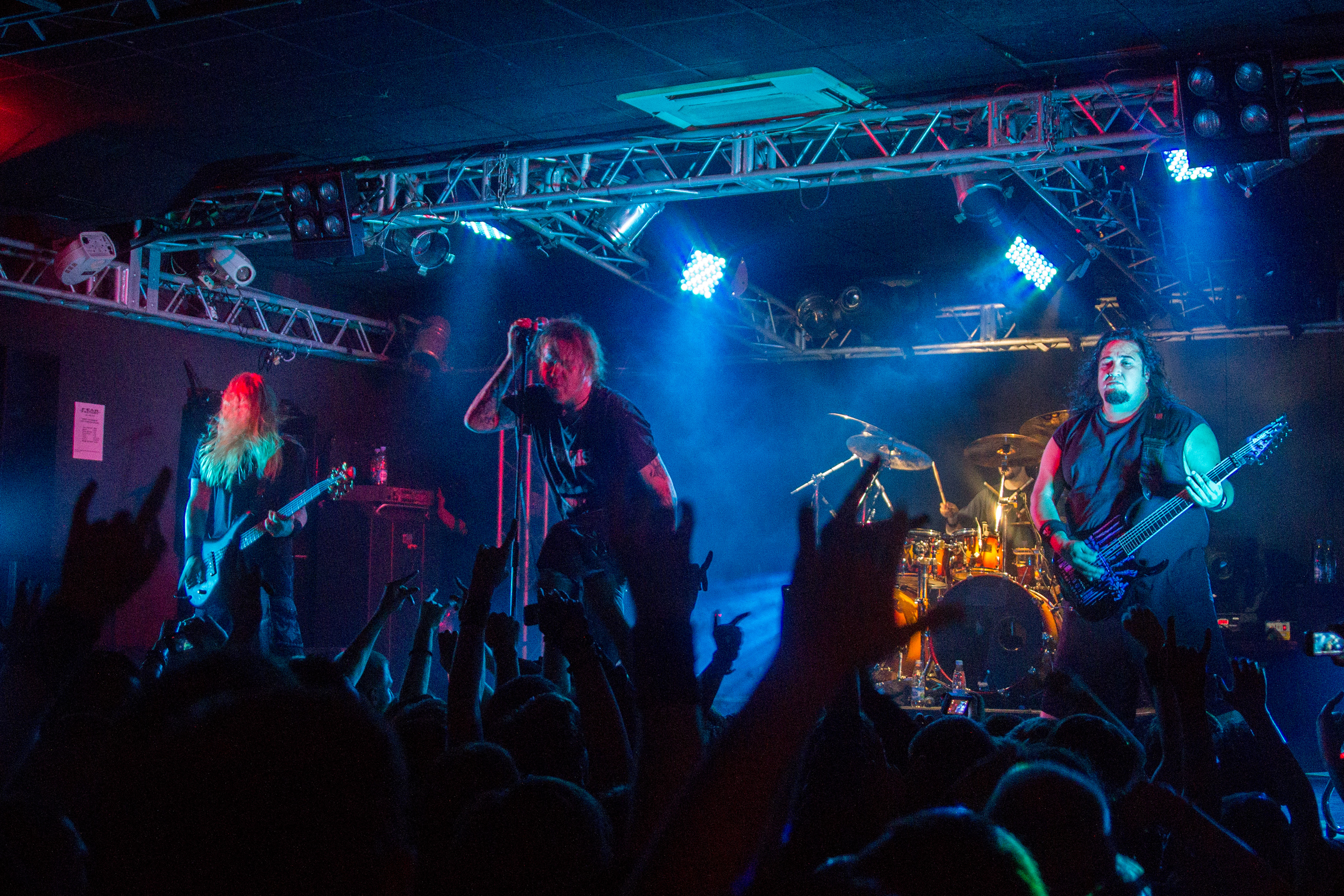
Fear Factory in Saint Petersburg, Russia, 2013

On May 1, 2013, Dino Cazares told Songfacts.com Fear Factory would begin work on their ninth studio album after the end of The Industrialist tour. The album was expected to be released in early 2014. On May 13, 2013, Burton C. Bell told Metal-Rules.com, "Fear Factory will continue to tour North America and Europe 2013. We've got some more tours scheduled, some summer festivals next year. During that time our plan is to start writing a new record and we would like to have a new record out by spring 2014". On March 19, 2014, Bell told Brave Words & Bloody Knuckles he would like to have the new album released by August, followed by a tour in September. On September 12, 2014, the band announced it had signed to record label Nuclear Blast and would enter the studio in October. The band also confirmed that the album would be mixed by Andy Sneap, and that Rhys Fulber would again produce it.

The band played their first shows in India, in November 2014, as part of the Weekender Tour, and on February/March 2015, they participated at the Soundwave Festival in Australia and New Zealand.

On May 1, 2015, it was announced that former Static-X and Soulfly bassist Tony Campos joined the band. Later that month, Fear Factory announced that they would release their ninth studio album, titled Genexus, on August 7, 2015.

They toured in European festivals in July 2015, and then onto North America, as an opening act for Coal Chamber. From late August until mid-September 2015, the band toured the midwestern, southern and southwestern United States with support from Once Human (starring Logan Mader), Los Angeles melodic metal band Before the Mourning and Chicago rock band The Bloodline. They also announced that they would play the entire Demanufacture album in Europe between November and December 2015, a tour which again included Once Human with the addition of Irish band Dead Label as openers.

=== Hiatus and lawsuits (2016–2019) ===
In a November 2016 interview with Loudwire, guitarist Dino Cazares revealed that Fear Factory had planned to release their tenth studio album in mid-to-late 2017. He stated, "Right now we're going to be home and doing a new record. We're writing already and in the process of doing a new record, but it probably won't be out until late summer of next year or maybe even October. I'm not exactly sure."

In a December 2016 interview with The Ex-Man, despite an ongoing "huge legal battle" with Bell and Cazares, former bassist-guitarist Christian Olde Wolbers stated that he was "trying to reach out and try to get this reunion thing happening." He added, "There would be nothing better for this band [than] to reconcile our differences, fucking write a killer record, which I know we can, and fucking we would be doing really big tours. My passion for playing and what we have invested in this band is very big, and I know it's really big for Dino as well, 'cause he started it with Raymond back in the day." More fuel to the possibility of a reunion with the "classic" lineup of Bell, Cazares, Herrera and Olde Wolbers was added later that month, when Olde Wolbers posted an image on his Instagram account, suggesting Fear Factory's official website was "under construction."

On May 7, 2017, Wolbers posted a blank picture on his Instagram (which was later deleted), claiming that Fear Factory had broken up. Later that day, Cazares was asked via Twitter if they were still together, and his response was, "Not sure why your asking that and rant by who?".

In an interview with Kilpop in May 2017, Burton C. Bell said that the new songs were "even stronger than Genexus, 'cause it just seems even more tight. We're on a groove, and it's kicking ass."

In an interview with SiriusXM's Jose Mangin at November 2018's inaugural Headbangers Con in Portland, Oregon, Bell revealed Monolith as the title of Fear Factory's tenth studio album and its tentative artwork via his smartphone. In October 2019, this was refuted by guitarist Dino Cazares who stated via his Twitter account that there was no new Fear Factory album. Shortly thereafter, Cazares expressed uncertainty towards the band's future, indicating that a lawsuit filed by former members Raymond Herrera and Christian Olde Wolbers had prevented him and Bell from using the Fear Factory name.

=== Split with Burton C. Bell and Aggression Continuum (2020–2022) ===
Fear Factory members intro during their concert in Munich on the 24th of November 2023.

On September 2, 2020, Dino Cazares announced he would be releasing new Fear Factory music in 2021. Less than a month later, Burton C. Bell announced he quit Fear Factory citing "consistent series of dishonest representations and unfounded accusations from past and present band members", leaving no original members left in the band besides Cazares. However, Bell's contributions to their upcoming album remained, as he recorded his vocals in 2017. He claimed his relationship with Cazares began to fray when they got into a physical altercation during the recording of Genexus, "because [Cazares] said something he shouldn't have".

In an interview with Robb Flynn on September 28, 2020, which took place within hours after Bell announced his departure from Fear Factory, Cazares claimed that he was not aware of the split until he "found out [about it] via social media." He also claimed that one of the reasons behind Bell's departure was not only due to the lawsuit that prevented the release of the band's new album, but because the latter's portion of the Fear Factory "trademark ownership became available", which left Cazares as the sole owner of the band name. Cazares reiterated that Bell's vocals would appear on the new album, which was being mixed by Andy Sneap for a March 2021 release, and hoped the pair would continue to work together in order to support it.

On April 1, 2021, Fear Factory announced that their first new song in over five years would be released on April 16. A short riff teaser of the song from Cazares was released soon after. The new single "Disruptor" was released on April 16, followed by the announcement of the tenth studio album Aggression Continuum, which was released on June 18.

=== Arrival of Milo Silvestro and Roboticist (2023–present) ===
While deciding on a new vocalist through auditions, Cazares said that gender would not play a role, expressing an open interest in hiring a woman; however, he said that he would not announce it for a while. Out of all the potential talents, he decided on a replacement who had yet to be revealed, with the member being a male and "kind of known" within the metal scene. He also said that the new member would be introduced through new songs. Wolbers expressed support for Cazares carrying on with the band. On February 21, 2023, the band finally unveiled that after auditioning over 300 people, Italian singer Milo Silvestro was their new vocalist. During the cancelation of the first date of the 2023 North American tour, it was revealed on an Instagram story post that Pete Webber of Havok would be filling in as drummer for the band.

In May 2023, Webber was confirmed as the new settled drummer for the ensemble.

In June 2023, a revised version of Fear Factory's 2012 album The Industrialist was released with the new title Re-Industrialized. This version featured re-recorded drum tracks performed by the band's previous drummer, Mike Heller, as well as remixes of two songs from the album: "Recharger" and "Difference Engine". Cazares also re-recorded all his guitar tracks with a different tone and some alterations to certain musical sections in each track. Three cover songs were also added to this new edition: "Landfill", "Saturation", and "Passing Complexion".

In November 2024, Cazares in an interview explained in further detail why a reunion of himself and Burton C. Bell, Christian Olde Wolbers, and Raymond Herrera, would not happen in the foreseeable future and how he came to own one hundred percent of the Fear Factory name intellectual property copyrights trademarks.

Fear Factory began recording their eleventh studio album on April 21, 2025. It is the first album to feature two new members in vocalist Milo Silvestro and drummer Pete Webber. Cazares revealed that he would be using an 8-string guitar on the album. He stated that it was going to be released in 2026. They are scheduled to tour in 2026 with Mushroomhead, Mongolian folk metal group Nine Treasures, Darkest Hour and Brotality. The band's first song in five years, and first single with Silvestro on vocals and Webber on drums, "Roboticist", was released on August 29, 2026. A follow-up single, "Detonizer", was released on November 10, 2026; on the same day, Fear Factory announced Roboticist as the title of their upcoming eleventh studio album and that it will be released on April 9, 2027.

== Musical style and influences ==
Dino Cazares in Munich enjoying fan support after performing "Archetype"

Fear Factory are known for blending death growls and machine gun-like riffing from extreme metal with clean vocals and electronic flourishes from industrial music, making them pioneers of not only industrial metal, but its subgenres, cyber metal and industrial death metal. They started as a death metal and grindcore band on their debut studio album, Soul of a New Machine, and especially the demo album, Concrete, but rose to popularity as part of the groove metal movement of the 1990s. Critics have also described the band's sound as alternative metal, thrash metal and nu metal, though Cazares has rejected the latter category. Guitar World wrote in 2004 that, "No one has crossed death metal rhythms with harsh, antiseptic industrial quite like Fear Factory."

A veteran of the Los Angeles thrash metal scene, Dino Cazares combined his love of British grindcore and extreme metal, such as Napalm Death and Godflesh, to create his "staccato paint-stripping riffs", while Burton C. Bell pioneered a blend of death metal howls and soaring melodic singing. The band is also influenced by Black Sabbath's albums from the 1970s, gothic rock, industrial music and thrash metal, such as Exodus, from the 1980s, and death metal and Pantera-esque groove metal from the 1990s. Fear Factory stayed true to the formula of industrial metal bands such as Ministry and Nine Inch Nails, with their use of samples, vocal techniques and lyrics about the government, but incorporated blast beats, dystopic imagery and staccato riffing.

Outside of music, Dino Cazares has cited interests in fantasy and science fiction alternative universes, such as the Terminator mythos and Dune mythos, as influences on the band. A specific example is their debut album, Soul of a New Machine, named after a line in a movie critic review of the Terminator 2: Judgment Day film (discussing the T-1000 villain). Cazares has also cited recurring influences on Fear Factory coming from conventional popular music, outside of the genres of hard rock and heavy metal, for instance looking to singer-songwriter Paul McCartney's sounds in both The Beatles and Wings. Over the years, the film Blade Runner has become a recurring theme as the band often makes lyrical reference to the plot, as well as directly quote and sample lines from the film.

== Legacy ==
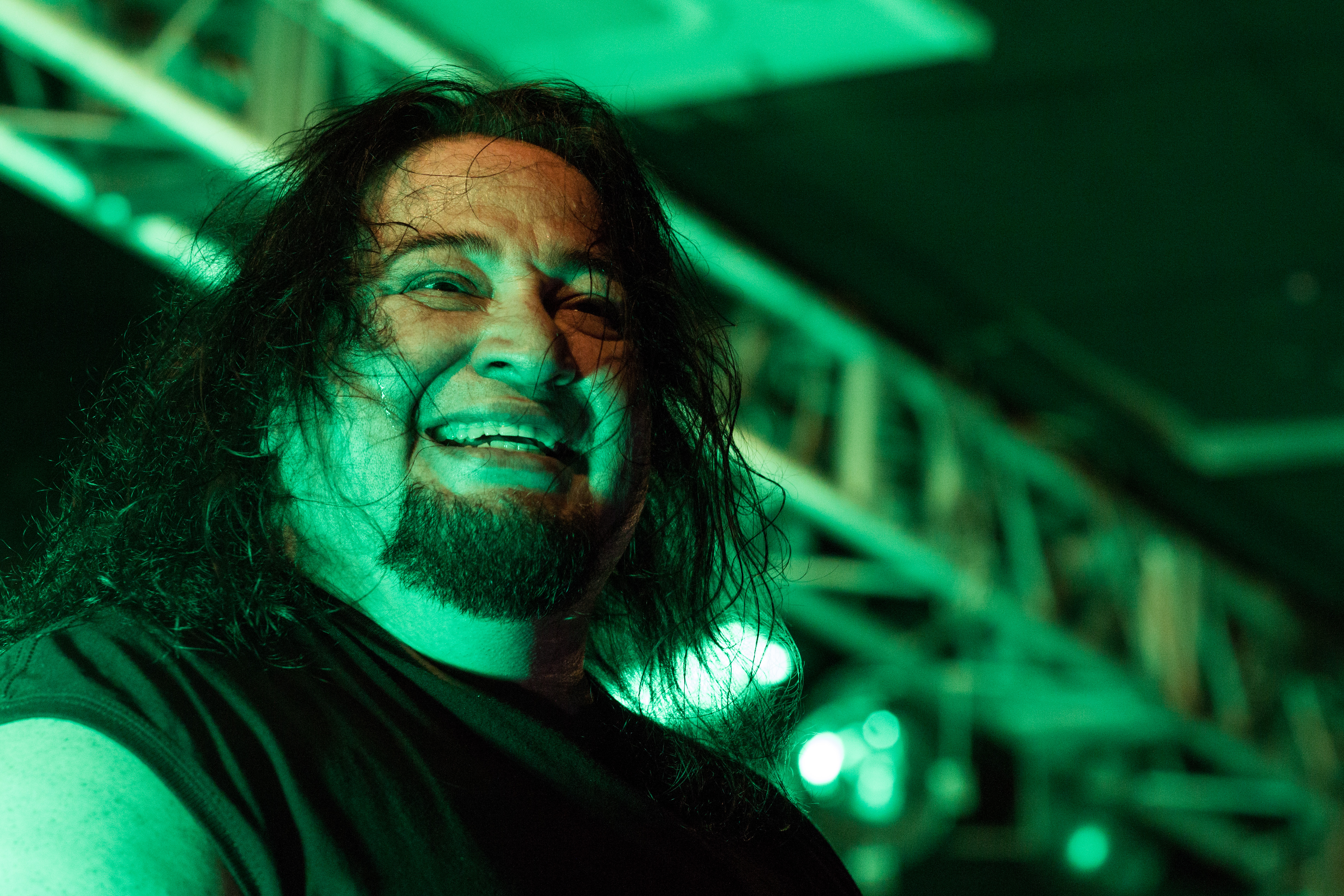
Dino Cazares in 2013

Fear Factory's innovative approach towards and hybridization of the genres industrial metal, death metal, and alternative metal has had a lasting impact on other artists coming later, the band putting a stamp on metal music ever since the release of their first album in 1992. Fear Factory is noteworthy among contemporaries for its lyrical focus on science fiction, with much of the band's music telling a single story spanning several concept albums. The band has been called a "stepping stone", leading mainstream listeners to venture into less-known, more extreme bands, and are consistently appreciated. Despite the heavy use of ambient and sampling sounds, the band has never had an official keyboardist in their lineup; they instead employ session/touring members.

While not often associated with djent, Fear Factory is seen as precursors to the genre and style of guitar playing, with CVLT Nation even coining the term "proto-djent" to describe the band. Dino Cazares used a technique of palm muting to make up for the band not being able to afford samplers, explaining: "I really developed a good technique with palm muting – stopping and starting with my palm, and creating a certain accent by just palm muting. I guess what people would call the ‘djent’, now. But the tightness came from trying to copy a sampler, a loop." His use of staccato riffing predates that of Mårten Hagström, the guitarist of Swedish extreme metal band Meshuggah and inventor of djent.

In the liner notes of the re-released version of Soul of a New Machine, Machine Head vocalist Robb Flynn, Chimaira vocalist Mark Hunter, and Spineshank guitarist Mike Sarkisyan cited Fear Factory as an influence. Robb Flynn said his vocal style was influenced by Burton C. Bell's vocals and Machine Head have been wrongly credited for the vocal style. Mark Hunter said Chimaira's drumming was heavily influenced by Raymond Herrera. Slipknot, Killswitch Engage, As I Lay Dying, Static-X, and Coal Chamber have also mentioned Fear Factory in their liner notes.

Modern bands including Mnemic, Scarve, Stiff Valentine, and Threat Signal contain significant influences from Fear Factory's technique and have also credited a substantial debt of gratitude to the band. Peter Tägtgren of Hypocrisy said, "Fear Factory are close to our hearts" and, "Soul of a New Machine was the influence for me to start my other project, 'Pain'". Devin Townsend of Strapping Young Lad said his main influences for Heavy as a Really Heavy Thing were Fear Factory and Napalm Death. In an interview on That Metal Show, former Black Sabbath drummer Bill Ward said Fear Factory is one of the bands he wishes he could play with, and picked Mechanize as one of his favourite albums.

== Band members ==
=== Current members ===
- Dino Cazares – guitars, backing vocals, studio bass (1989–2002, 2009–2026)
- Tony Campos – bass, backing vocals (2015–present)
- Milo Silvestro – lead vocals (2023–present)
- Pete Webber – drums (2023–present)

==== Current touring musicians ====
- Ricky Bonazza – bass, backing vocals (2024–present; substitute for Tony Campos)

=== Former members ===
- Burton C. Bell – lead vocals (1989–2002, 2003–2006, 2009–2020); keyboards (1995)
- Raymond Herrera – drums (1989–2002, 2003–2006)
- David Gibney – bass, backing vocals (1989–1991)
- Andy Romero – bass (1991–1992)
- Andrew Shives – bass (1992–1994)
- Christian Olde Wolbers – bass (1994–2002, studio only 2003–2006); guitars (2003–2006); backing vocals (1994–2006)
- Byron Stroud – bass (2003–2006, 2009–2012)
- Gene Hoglan – drums (2009–2012)
- Matt DeVries – bass, backing vocals (2012–2015)
- Mike Heller – drums (2012–2023)

==== Former touring musicians ====
- Javier Arriaga – bass (2023, 2024; substitute for Tony Campos)
- Alexandro Hernandez – bass (2023; substitute for Tony Campos)

=== Session keyboardists ===
- Rhys Fulber (1993–2002, 2003–2004, 2009–present)
- Reynor Diego (1992–1995)
- Steve Tushar (1995–1997, 2003–2005)
- John Morgan (1997)
- John Bechdel (1998–2002, 2002–2004)

== Discography ==
- Soul of a New Machine (1992)
- Demanufacture (1995)
- Obsolete (1998)
- Digimortal (2001)
- Archetype (2004)
- Transgression (2005)
- Mechanize (2010)
- The Industrialist (2012)
- Genexus (2015)
- Aggression Continuum (2021)
- Roboticist (2027)
