= Junkie XL discography =

- Studio albums: 6
- Singles: 17
- Music videos: 6

Dutch DJ Junkie XL has released six studio albums and multiple soundtrack albums.

== Albums ==
=== Studio albums ===
List of albums, with selected chart positions
Title	Album details	Peak chart positions	
Title	Album details	NL	US Dance
Saturday Teenage Kick	Released: 24 March 1997; Label: Roadrunner; Format: CD, LP, cassette, digital download	41	—
Big Sounds of the Drags	Released: 14 October 1999; Label: Roadrunner, Manifesto; Format: CD, LP, cassette, digital download	40	—
Radio JXL: A Broadcast from the Computer Hell Cabin	Released: 2 June 2003; Label: Roadrunner, Koch, Arista; Format: CD, LP, digital download	13	—
Today	Released: 18 April 2006; Label: Roadrunner, Ultra; Format: CD	36	—
Booming Back at You	Released: 11 March 2008; Label: Nettwerk; Format: CD, digital download	59	11
Synthesized	Released: 27 November 2012; Label: Nettwerk; Format: CD, digital download	53	—

== Singles ==
=== As lead artist ===
List of singles, with selected chart positions and certifications, showing year released and album name
Title	Year	Peak chart positions										Certifications	Album
Title	Year	NL	AUS	BEL (FL)	CAN	IRE	NZ	SWE	SWI	UK	US	Certifications	Album
"Billy Club"	1997	—	—	—	—	—	—	—	—	—	—		Saturday Teenage Kick
"Def Beat"	1997	—	—	—	—	—	—	—	—	—	—		Saturday Teenage Kick
"Saturday Teenage Kick"	1998	100	—	—	—	—	—	—	—	141	—		Saturday Teenage Kick
"Zerotonine"	1999	62	—	—	—	—	—	—	—	63	—		Big Sounds of the Drags
"Check Your Basic Groove"	1999	—	—	—	—	—	—	—	—	—	—		Big Sounds of the Drags
"Love Like Razorblade"	2000	71	—	—	—	—	—	—	—	—	—		Big Sounds of the Drags
"Bon Voyage"	2000	—	—	—	—	—	—	—	—	184	—		Big Sounds of the Drags
"A Little Less Conversation" (vs. Elvis Presley)	2002	1	1	3	1	1	1	1	1	1	50	ARIA: 2× Platinum; BEA: Gold; BPI: 2× Platinum; IFPI SWE: Platinum; IFPI SWI: Platinum; RIAA: Gold; RIANZ: Gold	ELV1S and Radio JXL: A Broadcast from the Computer Hell Cabin
"Obsession" (with Tiësto)	2002	—	—	—	—	—	—	—	—	56	—		In My Memory
"Catch Up to My Step" (featuring Solomon Burke)	2003	40	—	40	—	—	—	—	—	63	—		Radio JXL: A Broadcast from the Computer Hell Cabin
"Don't Wake Up Policeman" (featuring Peter Tosh & Friends)	2003	81	—	—	—	—	—	—	—	—	—		Radio JXL: A Broadcast from the Computer Hell Cabin
"Between These Walls" (featuring Anouk)	2003	41	—	—	—	—	—	—	—	—	—		Radio JXL: A Broadcast from the Computer Hell Cabin
"Today"	2006	51	—	—	—	—	—	—	—	—	—		Today
"Neem Mijn Hand" (with Henny Vrienten)	2006	28	—	—	—	—	—	—	—	—	—		Non-album singles
"Dark Territory"	2007	—	—	—	—	—	—	—	—	—	—		Non-album singles
"More"	2007	—	—	—	—	—	—	—	—	—	—		Booming Back at You
"Cities in Dust"	2008	—	—	—	—	—	—	—	—	—	—		Booming Back at You
"—" denotes a recording that did not chart or was not released in that territory.

=== As featured performer ===
List of singles, with selected chart positions, showing year released and album name
Title	Year	Peak chart positions	Album
Title	Year	NL	Album
"Dance Valley 2000" (Dance Valley Crew featuring Junkie XL)	2000	93	Non-album single

== Soundtracks ==
Year	Album details
2007	Music From SSX Blur: Released: 20 February 2007; Label: Electronic Arts Recordings; Format: CD, digital download
2007	Need for Speed: ProStreet: Released: 11 December 2007; Label: Electronic Arts Recordings; Format: CD, digital download
2013	Paranoia: Original Motion Picture Soundtrack: Released: 13 August 2013; Label: Relativity Music; Formats: CD, digital download
2014	300: Rise of an Empire (Original Motion Picture Soundtrack): Released: 3 March 2014; Label: WaterTower Music; Formats: CD, digital download
2014	Divergent: Original Motion Picture Soundtrack: Released: 11 March 2014; Label: Interscope Records; Formats: CD, digital download
2014	The Amazing Spider-Man 2: Original Motion Picture Soundtrack: Released: 18 April 2014; Label: Columbia Records and Madison Gate Records; Formats: CD, digital download
2015	Run All Night: Original Motion Picture Soundtrack: Released: 10 March 2015; Label: WaterTower Music; Formats: CD, digital download
2015	Mad Max: Fury Road (Original Motion Picture Soundtrack): Released: 12 May 2015; Label: WaterTower Music; Formats: CD, digital download
2015	Black Mass (Original Motion Picture Soundtrack): Released: 11 September 2015; Label: WaterTower Music; Formats: CD, digital download
2015	Point Break (Original Motion Picture Soundtrack): Released: 4 December 2015; Label: Sleeping Giant; Formats: CD, digital download
2016	Deadpool (Original Motion Picture Soundtrack): Released: 12 February 2016; Label: Milan Records; Formats: CD, digital download
2016	Batman v Superman: Dawn of Justice (Original Motion Picture Soundtrack): Released: 18 March 2016; Label: WaterTower Music; Formats: CD, digital download
2019	Alita: Battle Angel (Original Motion Picture Soundtrack): Released: 19 February 2019; Label: Milan Records; Formats: CD, digital download
2020	Sonic the Hedgehog (Music from the Motion Picture): Released: 14 February 2020; Label: Paramount Music; Formats: CD, digital download, vinyl
2021	Zack Snyder's Justice League (Original Motion Picture Soundtrack): Released: 18 March 2021; Label: WaterTower Music; Formats: Vinyl, digital download
2021	Army of the Dead (Music From the Netflix Film): Released: 21 May 2021; Label: Milan Records; Formats: CD, digital download
2022	Sonic the Hedgehog 2 (Music from the Motion Picture): Released: 8 April 2022; Label: Paramount Music; Formats: CD, digital download
2024	Furiosa: A Mad Max Saga (Original Motion Picture Soundtrack): Released: 20 May 2024; Label: WaterTower Music; Formats: CD, digital download
2024	Sonic the Hedgehog 3 (Music from the Motion Picture): Released: 20 December 2024; Label: Milan Records; Formats: CD, digital download

== Other album appearances ==
=== Soundtracks ===
Year	Song(s)	Album	Notes	Ref.
2001	"Action Radius"	Ginger Snaps	"Love Like Razorblade" Is also in the film but was not released on the official soundtrack.	
2003	"Action Radius"	Need For Speed: Underground		
2007	"More" (feat. Lauren Rocket)	Need For Speed: ProStreet		

== Remixes ==
- 1997 Fear Factory - Burn
- 1997 Fear Factory - Cyberdyne
- 1997 Fear Factory - Refueled
- 1997 Fear Factory - Genetic Blueprint
- 1997 Fear Factory - Bionic Chronic
- 1997 Dog Eat Dog - Step Right In
- 1997 Chris Hinze - Peace Minds
- 1998 3 Colours Red - Paralyse
- 1998 Project Pitchfork - Carnival
- 1998 (HED) P.E. - Serpent Boy
- 1998 The Trammps - Disco Inferno
- 1999 Fear Factory - Cars
- 1999 Fear Factory - Descent
- 1999 Kong - "Yèllow Mystiç"
- 1999 Soulfly - Umbabarauma
- 1999 Tanith - T.A.N.I.T.H.
- 2000 DJ Sandy vs. Housetrap - Overdrive
- 2000 Shanks & Bigfoot - Sing-A-Long
- 2000 Praga Khan - Power of The Flower
- 2000 Junkie XL - Zerotonine
- 2000 Way Out West - UB Devoid
- 2001 Ayumi Hamasaki - Vogue
- 2001 Conjure One - Redemption
- 2002 Natalie Imbruglia - Beauty On The Fire
- 2002 Elvis Presley - A Little Less Conversation
- 2002 Fischerspooner - Emerge
- 2002 Rammstein - Feuer frei!
- 2003 Conjure One - Center of The Sun
- 2003 Syntax - Pray
- 2003 Dave Gahan - Dirty Sticky Floors
- 2003 Infusion - Legacy
- 2003 BT - Somnambulist (Simply Being Loved)
- 2003 Fear Factory - Edgecrusher
- 2003 Junkie XL - Between These Walls
- 2003 Junkie XL - Angels
- 2003 Mylène Farmer - XXL
- 2003 Scissor Sisters - Mary
- 2004 Michael Bublé - Spider-Man Theme & "Swag"
- 2004 Britney Spears - Outrageous
- 2004 Beastie Boys - (You Gotta) Fight for Your Right (To Party!)
- 2004 Ryukyu Underground - Seragaki
- 2004 Sarah McLachlan - World on Fire
- 2005 Tiësto - UR
- 2005 Britney Spears - And Then We Kiss
- 2005 The Crew-Cuts - Sh-Boom
- 2005 The Go-Go's - Our Lips Are Sealed
- 2005 Culture Club - I'll Tumble 4 Ya
- 2006 Niyaz - Dilruba
- 2006 Mark Mothersbaugh - The Sims Theme
- 2006 Coldplay - Talk
- 2006 Scissor Sisters - Land of a Thousand Words
- 2006 Yonderboi - People Always Talk About The Weather
- 2006 UNKLE - Burn My Shadow
- 2007 melody. - Feel The Rush
- 2007 Fatboy Slim - Weapon of Choice
- 2007 Avril Lavigne - Girlfriend
- 2007 Junkie XL - Colossus of Rhodes
- 2007 Justin Timberlake - What Goes Around...
- 2007 Junkie XL - More
- 2007 Britney Spears - Gimme More
- 2007 Tom Jones - Feels Like Music
- 2008 Junkie XL - Cities in Dust
- 2008 Junkie XL - Not Enough
- 2008 Madonna and Justin Timberlake - 4 Minutes
- 2008 Eagles of Death Metal - Don't Speak
- 2008 Jape - I Was A Man
- 2008 Lisa Miskovsky - Still Alive
- 2009 Nami Tamaki - Believe
- 2010 Steve Jablonsky - The Sims Theme
- 2010 Hans Zimmer - Inception
- 2010 Daft Punk - The Grid
- 2012 Hans Zimmer - Bombers Over Ibiza

== Music videos ==
Year	Title	Album
1997	"Billy Club"	Saturday Teenage Kick
1997	"X-Panding Limits"	Saturday Teenage Kick
2002	"A Little Less Conversation" (vs. Elvis Presley)	ELV1S/Radio JXL: A Broadcast from the Computer Hell Cabin
2003	"Catch Up to My Step" (featuring Solomon Burke)	Radio JXL: A Broadcast from the Computer Hell Cabin
2003	"Don't Wake Up Policeman" (featuring Peter Tosh & Friends)	Radio JXL: A Broadcast from the Computer Hell Cabin
2006	"Today"	Today
