= Pump Up the Volume (soundtrack) =

Music from the original motion picture soundtrack (1990)

Pump Up the Volume (Music From the Original Motion Picture Soundtrack)

Soundtrack album by various artists
- Released: August 14, 1990
- Genre: Rock
- Length: 46:32
- Label: MCA
- Producer: Dennis Herring; Ron Saint Germain; Above The Law; David Bianco; Ivan Neville; Kenny Lee Lewis; Marc DeSisto; Michael Timmins; Peter Moore; Peter Murphy; Pixies; Sonic Youth; Soundgarden; Todd Rigione

Pump Up the Volume (Music From the Original Motion Picture Soundtrack) is the soundtrack to Allan Moyle's 1990 drama film Pump Up the Volume. It was released on August 14, 1990 through MCA Records. The album peaked at number 50 on the US Billboard 200 chart.

Professional ratings
Review scores
Source	Rating
AllMusic	3/5 stars

Music being central to the plot of a film about a young pirate radio station DJ, the soundtrack featured a diverse number of artists. The official soundtrack release had eleven tracks.

== Song information ==
The soundtrack features several covers. The Cowboy Junkies' contribution to the soundtrack is a remake of a Robert Johnson song, while the Bad Brains and Henry Rollins track is a cover of the MC5 anthem "Kick Out the Jams". "Stand" by Liquid Jesus is a new version of the 1969 song by Sly & the Family Stone.

Peter Murphy's exclusive track was later included on a special reissue of his 1988 album, Love Hysteria, while Sonic Youth's song appeared on their 1990 release, Goo.

An earlier version of Soundgarden's "Heretic" appears on the 1985 Seattle band compilation album Deep Six. Concrete Blonde revisited "Everybody Knows" on their 2003 album, Live in Brazil. The original, upbeat version of "Wave of Mutilation" appears on Doolittle, the third studio album by Pixies, while the UK Surf version was a B-side for a single from the album, "Here Comes Your Man".

A number of songs prominently featured in the film did not appear on the officially released soundtrack, including the original version of "Everybody Knows" by Leonard Cohen, which appeared on his 1988 album, I'm Your Man. Although Cohen's version serves as the theme song for Mark's (Christian Slater) pirate radio program during most of the film, he opens his final broadcast with the Concrete Blonde cover that appears on the soundtrack. Another Cohen song appears briefly when Mark is talking about Malcom's suicide on the air. The song is "If It Be Your Will" from Cohen's 1984 release Various Positions. Also present in the film but absent from the soundtrack are "Hello, Dad, I'm in Jail" by Was (Not Was) from their 1988 album What Up, Dog?, "Fast Lane" by Urban Dance Squad from their 1990 album Mental Floss for the Globe, "Weinerschnitzel" by The Descendents from their 1981 EP Fat, "Love Comes in Spurts" by Richard Hell and the Voidoids from their 1977 album Blank Generation, and "Talk Hard" by Stan Ridgway. "Girls L.G.B.N.A.F." by Ice-T is played on a boombox outside of the school by some boys.

Not as prominently featured is a legendary early track by the Beastie Boys entitled "The Scenario". Although the song appears only briefly in Pump Up the Volume, it is notable because it never appeared in any official release. However, it is available on hard to find bootleg recordings. The song was cut from the Beastie's Def Jam album Licensed to Ill after being deemed too explicit. Christian Slater's character explains this when he introduces it on the air saying, "Now here's a song from my close personal buddies, the Beastie Boys...a song that was so controversial they couldn't put it on their first album".

== Track listing ==
No.	Title	Writer(s)	Producer(s)	Length
1.	"Everybody Knows" (performed by Concrete Blonde)	L. Cohen	Dennis Herring	4:42
2.	"Why Can't I Fall in Love" (performed by Ivan Neville)	Kenny Lee Lewis; John Finley	Marc Di Sisto; Ivan Neville; Kenny Lee Lewis	4:02
3.	"Stand!" (performed by Liquid Jesus)	S. Stewart	David Bianco; Todd Rigione	4:22
4.	"Wave of Mutilation (UK Surf)" (performed by Pixies)	C. Thompson IV	Pixies	3:00
5.	"I've Got a Miniature Secret Camera" (performed by Peter Murphy)	P. Murphy; E. Branch	Peter Murphy	4:26
6.	"Kick Out the Jams" (performed by Bad Brains & Henry Rollins)	M. Davis; W. Kramer; F. Smith; D. Thompson; R. Derminer	Ron Saint Germain	3:03
7.	"Freedom of Speech" (performed by Above The Law)	G. Hutchison; L. Goodman; J. Brown	Above The Law; Dr. Dre (co.)	4:15
8.	"Heretic" (performed by Soundgarden)	K. Thayil; H. Yamamoto	Soundgarden; Terry Date (co.)	3:48
9.	"Titanium Exposé" (performed by Sonic Youth)	K. Gordon; T. Moore; L. Ranaldo; S. Shelley	Sonic Youth; Ron Saint Germain (co.); Nick Sansano (co.)	6:01
10.	"Me and the Devil Blues" (performed by Cowboy Junkies)	R. Johnson	Michael Timmins; Peter J. Moore	5:34
11.	"Tale O' the Twister" (performed by Chagall Guevara)	L. Nichols; D. Perkins; S. Taylor	Dennis Herring	3:20
Total length:				46:32

== Other songs in the film ==
No.	Title	Writer(s)	Producer(s)	Length
1.	"Everybody Knows" (performed by Leonard Cohen)	L. Cohen		5:36
2.	"Talk Hard" (performed by Stan Ridgway & MJ-12)	S. Ridgway	Stan Ridgway	3:40
3.	"Love Comes in Spurts" (performed by Richard Hell)	R. Meyers		2:03
4.	"If It Be Your Will" (performed by Leonard Cohen)	L. Cohen	John Lissauer	3:43
5.	"Girls L.G.B.N.A.F." (performed by Ice-T)	T. Marrow; C. Glenn	Afrika Islam; Ice-T	3:00
6.	"Get Together"	C. Powers, Jr.
7.	"WeinerSchnitzel" (performed by Descendents)	B. Stevenson; P. McCuistion	Spot	0:10
8.	"Scenario" (performed by Beastie Boys)	A. Horovitz; A. Yauch; M. Diamond; F. Rubin	Rick Rubin	5:00
9.	"Dad, I'm in Jail" (performed by Was (Not Was))	D. Weiss; D. Fagenson		1:25
10.	"Fast Lane" (performed by Urban Dance Squad)	P. Tilon; A. de Vreede; S. Matadin; M. Schoots; R. van Barneveld	Jean-Marie Aerts	3:16

== Chart history ==
Chart (1990)	Peak position
US Billboard 200	50

== Certifications ==
Region	Certification	Certified units/sales
United States (RIAA)	Gold	500,000^{^}
^{^} Shipments figures based on certification alone.
