= Planet Ultra =

Studio album by Urban Dance Squad
- Released: 1996
- Length: 48:45
- Label: Virgin
- Producer: Urban Dance Squad

Urban Dance Squad chronology
Persona Non Grata (1994)	Planet Ultra (1996)	Artantica (1999)

Professional ratings
Review scores
Source	Rating
AllMusic	3/5 stars
The Encyclopedia of Popular Music	3/5 stars
Rock Hard	8/10

Planet Ultra is the fourth studio album by the Dutch rap rock band Urban Dance Squad, released in 1996 by Virgin Records. Though DJ DNA had not yet returned by this point, the band once again made use of turntables. Band member Rudeboy sings on the album.

== Production ==
The album was produced by the band, with mixing done by Phil Nicolo.

== Track listing ==
Side A
No.	Title	Length
1.	"Nonstarter"	4:36
2.	"Temporarily Expendable"	3:32
3.	"Forgery"	2:15
4.	"Planet Ultra"	4:59
5.	"Dresscode"	5:02
6.	"Totalled"	2:57
Total length:		23:23

Side B
No.	Title	Length
1.	"Warzone 109"	3:13
2.	"Metaphore Warfare"	2:48
3.	"Ego"	2:38
4.	"Carbon Copy"	3:39
5.	"Everyday Blitzkrieg"	1:17
6.	"Stark Sharks & Backlashes"	3:16
7.	"Grifter Swifter"	6:21
8.	"Tabloid Say"	2:05
Total length:		25:23

The compact disc adds the tracks "Inside-Outsider", "Pass The Baton Right", "Damn The Quota" and "Natural Born Communicator".
