= Stuurbaard Bakkebaard =

Dutch band

Stuurbaard Bakkebaard (also known as SBBB) is a Dutch rock band formed in 1996.

Their early work has been frequently compared to artists such as G. Love, Tom Waits and de Kift. The band is known for its unconventional use of their instruments. In their more recent work there is a shift towards an increasing experimental approach. The band is widely recognized and appreciated internationally for their unique individuality, creativity, and captivating stage presentation.

== Biography ==
The first appearance of Stuurbaard Bakkebaard is as a (at that point unnamed) duo. The songs are made up on the spot, while playing. In 1997, the duo added a drummer, and the name Stuurbaard Bakkebaard arises. From its inception the band plays as often as possible.

The first album Chuck was released in 2001. First released on the band's own label Chuckophonic, but soon taken over by record label Munich. The band plays frequently with de Kift. Shortly after the release of Chuck, the band is invited to play at festivals like Lowlands, Noorderslag, Oerol, Crossing Border, Motel Mozaïque and more. In 2002 SBBB regularly shares the stage with Krang, a band featuring Andre Manuel. In six days, the second album Mercedes was recorded and mixed in 2003. The freedom of the live feel is central, a large part of the songwriting occurred during these recordings. Stuurbaard Bakkebaard toured with Norwegian band Kaizers Orchestra.

In the autumn of 2004 following a tour with the band Fokofpolisiekar in South Africa. Third album Whistle Dixie is released in May 2005, followed by an extensive club tour. Stuurbaard Bakkebaard made music for the Flemish film C'est arrivé près de chez vous / also known as Man Bites Dog, and performs it live in cinemas and clubs. Stuurbaard Bakkebaard contributed to the album 7 by de Kift. The band played at the French festival "Transmusicales de Rennes". In collaboration with Dutch visual artist Rik van Iersel, Stuurbaard Bakkebaard is responsible for setting up the Beukorkest, a project that veers between avant garde, hip hop, trash, jazz, roots, blues and spoken word. Up to 15 musicians are invited to a series of collaborative performances, with minimal preparation. These musicians often have very different backgrounds, the experiment is paramount. Members included Johnny Dowd (USA), Gary Lucas (Captain Beefheart), Hakon Gebhart (Motorpsycho), Kyteman and DJ DNA (Urban Dance Squad). DJ DNA is added as a fourth bandmember. The fourth album L'Amour was released in 2009. The addition of the beats, scratches and samples of DJ DNA make for a still recognisable, but more "electric" sound.

== Discography ==
- Chuck (Munich records 2001)
- Mercedes (Munich records 2003)
- Whistle Dixie (Munich records 2005)
- L'Amour ([PIAS] recordings 2009)
- Boys Do Cry ([PIAS] recordings 2013)
- Feeding The Rats (SBBB 2026)
