= Saturday Teenage Kick =

- Album cover used in Europe, Australia, Japan, and Mexico.

Studio album by Junkie XL
- Released: March 24, 1997
- Genre: Electronic; trip hop; big beat; alternative rock
- Length: 69:56
- Label: Roadrunner

Junkie XL chronology
Saturday Teenage Kick (1997)	Big Sounds of the Drags (1999)

Singles from Saturday Teenage Kick
- 1. "Def Beat" Released: 1997; 2. "Billy Club" Released: February 10, 1998 (US); 3. "Saturday Teenage Kick" Released: March 9, 1998 (Europe)

Professional ratings
Review scores
Source	Rating
Allmusic	3/5 stars

Saturday Teenage Kick is the first studio album by the Dutch electronic musician Junkie XL, released in 1997.

This album features vocal work by Patrick 'Rude Boy' Tilon from the Dutch group Urban Dance Squad.

Some of the album tracks (Dealing with the Roster, War, No Remorse, X-Panding Limits, Def Beat, Mulu, Underachievers, and a live version of Fight) were added to the hoax The Prodigy album The Castbreeder in 1998 under different names.

== Track listing ==
1. "Underachievers" – 5:32
2. "Billy Club" – 4:08
3. "No Remorse" – 6:40
4. "Metrolike" – 5:37
5. "X-Panding Limits" – 3:17
6. "War" – 2:49
7. "Saturday Teenage Kick" – 4:15
8. "Dealing with the Roster" – 5:27
9. "Fight" – 5:38
10. "Melange" – 4:07
11. "Def Beat" – 4:54
12. "Future in Computer Hell" – 17:51
13. "Mulu" (hidden track) – starts 8:03 into the above track (only on the Netherlands, Poland, Australia and digital releases, other releases end where Mulu starts)

== Personnel ==
- Tom Holkenborg – producer, writer, engineering, mixing, programming, keyboards, bass, guitars
- Silver Surfering Rudeboy – vocals, songwriting
- Rene van der Zee – guitars
- Dino Cazares – guitars
- Baz Mattie – drums
- Hay Zeelen – mastering
- Lucas van Slegtenhorst – A&R
