= Pump Up the Volume =

Pump Up the Volume may refer to:

- "Pump Up the Volume" (song) (1987), by M|A|R|R|S
- Pump Up the Volume (film), a 1990 film
  - Pump Up the Volume (soundtrack), a soundtrack album from the film

== See also ==
- Pump Up the Valuum, an album by NOFX
