= Ooh =

Ooh or Oooh may refer to:

== Music ==
- OOOH! (Out of Our Heads), a 2002 album by The Mekons
- Ooooooohhh... On the TLC Tip, a 1992 album by TLC
- "Ooh!", 2003 single by Mary J. Blige
- "Oooh.", a 2000 song by De La Soul featuring Redman
- "Ooh", a song by BoDeans (1988)
- "Ooh", a song by Brook Benton and the Sandmen (1955)
- "Ooh", a song by La Lupe (1963)
- "Ooh", a song by Rivers Cuomo from Alone: The Home Recordings of Rivers Cuomo (2007)
- "Ooh", a song by Roy Ayers (1982)
- "Ooh", a song by Scissor Sisters (2006)
- "Oooh", a song by Caravan Palace from Caravan Palace (2008)
- "Ooh", a song by Sophie from the 10th anniversary reissue of Product (2015)

== Other uses ==
- Occupational Outlook Handbook, a biennial publication of the U.S. Bureau of Labor Statistics
- Out-of-home advertising
- Out-of-hours service
- oOh!media, an Australian advertising company

== See also ==
- "Ooouuu", 2016 single by Young M.A
- Ooo (disambiguation)
- Ooh La La (disambiguation)
