= Black Mass (soundtrack) =

Black Mass (Original Motion Picture Soundtrack)

Film score by Tom Holkenborg
- Released: September 11, 2015
- Recorded: Eastwood Scoring Stage, Warner Bros. Studios, Burbank, California
- Genre: Film score
- Length: 61:26
- Label: WaterTower Music
- Producer: Tom Holkenborg

Tom Holkenborg chronology
Mad Max: Fury Road (2015)	Black Mass (2015)	Kill Your Friends (2015)

Black Mass (Original Motion Picture Soundtrack) is the film score composed by Tom Holkenborg to the 2015 film Black Mass directed by Scott Cooper starring Johnny Depp, Joel Edgerton, Benedict Cumberbatch, Kevin Bacon, Jesse Plemons, Peter Sarsgaard, Dakota Johnson and Corey Stoll. The original score was released through WaterTower Music on September 11, 2015.

== Background ==
Tom Holkenborg composed the film score for Black Mass. Holkenborg recalled that he suffered from flu before he watched the film at the screening room during morning and informed the Cooper to call him back in the afternoon to receive his feedback. Later, he discussed with Cooper in a telephonic conversation where he discussed James "Whitey" Bulger (played by Depp) as a "cobra"-like character, where his voice and his appearance determine that "he is completely in control and you just see the life being sucked out of the other characters." Holkenborg wanted to humanize Bulger instead of knowing him as the criminal, the same goes for John Connolly (played by Edgerton). He decided to utilize the music to echo the parallels between Bulger and Connolly and the shifts of power in their connection.

Holkenborg played two distinct and separate themes for the characters, but swapped the instrumentation back and forth, so that the main themes for the characters being played on the piano and cello, and vice versa. This was primarily due to the characters growing up together, creating a natural environment, so that the instrumentation and themes were correlated to each other in terms of color, not in Notes. The themes for the respective characters also trickle down to all the characters that are connected to them. Hence, Conolly's theme was connected to the FBI and Whitey's theme is to the White Hill Gang: Fleming and other characters he worked on a daily basis. Holkenborg was also specific on the sound design, using acoustic instruments such as strings and piano for the sounds, but instructed the players clearly that they should play without vibrato to get a "cold qualty". The strings then play with vibrato from the hospital scene to underscore the character's emotions, and as they become more isolated, the music becomes more emotional. Holkenborg also experimented with synthesizers for the score.

Since the film covers the 1975–2011 time period, songs from that era were used. But he wanted the score to stick with the characters and character development, and indicating their passage of time would draw too much attention itself. This approach made more sense drawing the audience in to show what is happening and how the theme of loyalty and brotherhood comes into play at the very end, in which Connolly would face the consequences because of not giving up his principles. The death of Bulger's young son from Reye syndrome was a difficult scene, as it was the turning point in the film, and Holkenborg worked on it a lot. Holkenborg recalled numerous incidents happening at that time, and that scene served as the warm-up point. But thereafter, the music becomes darker as he transitions into a completely different person, which led to his girlfriend leaving her, and what follows is his sadness that turns into an extreme anger and then turns into silence. Afterwards, there is a night shot of the city, which echoes back the emotion and then his pivotal transition, taking a different road ahead. Holkenborg also used silence in a conversation scene with Connolly and his boss at a kitchen table and used minimal music during Bulger's arrival.

== Track listing ==
No.	Title	Length
1.	"Black Mass Opening Title"	1:10
2.	"Boston Crime Lord"	3:15
3.	"John Collolly"	1:56
4.	"Bulger Burial Ground"	1:21
5.	"My Boy"	4:05
6.	"Don't Wake Him Up"	3:06
7.	"You Got Two Minutes"	1:24
8.	"Asprin"	1:13
9.	"No Drugs, No Murder"	1:46
10.	"I Will Pull the Plug Myself"	2:36
11.	"When You Wake Up in the Morning"	2:33
12.	"It's Just the Beginning"	3:57
13.	"Martorano"	3:46
14.	"Did You Ever See Whitey Bulger Murder Anyone?"	2:44
15.	"Thanks to Whitey"	2:17
16.	"Jimmy and Marianne"	2:40
17.	"You'll Be Sorry"	2:06
18.	"Boston Globe"	4:15
19.	"Valhalla"	3:22
20.	"Strictly Criminal"	4:55
21.	"Take Care Kid"	6:59
Total length:		61:26

== Reception ==
Jonathan Broxton of Movie Music UK wrote "The music in Black Mass isn't especially challenging on a compositional level, nor is it especially groundbreaking intellectually – it's a one theme score written for a limited orchestral palette, with some instrumental variations and a few subdued action moments – but it does show Holkenborg thinking like a film composer, writing music which has a logical progression from Point A to Point B in terms of thematic development, and which hits all the right emotional markers along the way. It's also impressive that Holkenborg orchestrated and mixed the score himself, without any help from his colleagues at Remote Control, proving that this score represents his voice alone. Seeing how Holkenborg has successfully navigated this important step in his career makes me feel much more positive about what he may accomplish in the future. Someone should give him a romantic comedy, or a western, or something else outside his established comfort zone, and I'll be waiting with anticipation to see what happens next."

Scott Foundas of Variety wrote "In a complete about-face from his adrenaline-pumping "Mad Max: Fury Road" soundtrack, Dutch composer/producer Tom Holkenborg (aka Junkie XL) supplies an elegiac orchestral score that perfectly complements the film's desperate, wintry mood." Jim Vejvoda of IGN noted that Holkenborg's "morose, yet tense score" accentuated the moodiness. Lee Marshall of Screen International wrote "Tom Holkenborg's tense musical soundscapes stand out". Tim Jackson of The Arts Fuse wrote "Tom Holkenborg's score is one of the film's key elements: it fills the drama with resonate musical themes, emotions and, mischievously, the kind of dread found in a horror film." Francesca Rudkin of The New Zealand Herald called it "a tense musical score from Dutch composer Tom Holkenborg". Mark Jenkins of NPR called it "doleful".

== Personnel ==
Credits adapted from liner notes:

- Music composer, arranger, producer, recording, mixing and mastering – Tom Holkenborg
- Programming – Aljoscha Christenhuß, Emad Borjian, Stephen Perone
- Score recordist – Tom Hardisty, Tom Holkenborg
- Score technical engineer – Ryan Robinson
- Pro-tools operator – Vincent Cirelli
- Score editor – Katrina Schiller
- Score coordinator – Michiel Groeneveld
- Copyist – Edward Trybek, Henri Wilkinson, Jonathan Beard
- Art direction – Sandeep Sriram
- Executive producer – Scott Cooper

Orchestra

- Orchestra – Hollywood Studio Symphony
- Orchestrator – Tom Holkenborg
- Conductor – Nick Glennie-Smith
- Contractor – Peter Rotter
- Concertmaster – Bruce Dukov
- Stage manager – Jamie Olvera
- Stage crew – Richard Wheeler Jr.

Instruments

- Bass – Christian Kollgaard, Neil Garber, Nico Philippon, Stephen Dress, Edward Meares, Michael Valerio
- Bassoon – Judith Farmer, Samantha Duckworth, Rose Corrigan
- Cello – Armen Ksajikian, Cecilia Tsan, Dane Little, David Speltz, Dennis Karmazyn, Erika Duke-Kirkpatrick, George Kim Scholes, Giovanna Clayton, Jacob Braun, Paula Hochhalter, Steve Richards, Timothy Landauer, Steve Erdody
- Clarinet – Donald Foster, Ralph Williams, Stuart Clark
- Drums, bass and synthesizers – Tom Holkenborg
- English horn – Leslie Reed
- Guitar – Tom Holkenborg, Charles Smith
- Viola – Alma Fernandez, Brian Dembow, Dale Hikawa-Silverman, Darrin Mc Cann, David Walther, Zach Dellinger, Laura Pearson, Luke Maurer, Matt Funes, Meredith Crawford, Michael Nowak, Pam Jacobson, Rob Brophy, Shawn Mann, Victoria Miskolczy
- Violin – Ana Landauer, Andrew Bulbrook, Ben Powell, Ben Jacobson, Charlie Bisharat, Darius Campo, Elizabeth Hedman, Eun-Mee Ahn, Grace Oh, Helen Nightengale, Irina Voloshina, Jay Rosen, Jessica Guideri, Joel Pargman, Julie Rogers, Mary Sloan, Katia Popov, Kevin Connolly, Lisa Liu, Lisa Sutton, Marc Sazer, Maria Newman, Natalie Leggett, Neil Samples, Phil Levy, Rafael Rishik, Roberto Cani, Roger Wilkie, Sandy Cameron, Sarah Thornblade, Serena Mc Kinney, Shalini Vijayan, Songa Lee, Tamara Hatwan, Tereza Stanislav, Yelena Yegoryan, Julie Gigante

Management

- Music business and legal affairs – Dirk Hebert
- Executive in charge of music for Warner Bros. Pictures – Amanda Narkis, Niki Sherrod, Paul Broucek
- Executive in charge of WaterTower Music – Jason Linn
- Artist management – Michiel Groeneveld
- Booking agent – Amos Newman
