= Sayoko Ohashi =

Japanese actress and gravure model (born 1985)

- Born: May 20, 1985 (age 41); Chiba, Chiba Prefecture, Japan
- Height: 1.62 m (5 ft 4 in)
- Website: http://ohsayoko.at.webry.info/

Sayoko Ohashi (大橋沙代子, おおはしさよこ, Ōhashi Sayoko; born May 20, 1985) is a Japanese actress and gravure model. She is one of the models featured in the video game Need for Speed: ProStreet, and acts alongside fellow professional model Krystal Forscutt. She also performed a minor voice role in the Japanese-language version of the video game Onimusha: Dawn of Dreams. Her favourite sport is volleyball.

== Filmography ==
=== Dramas ===
Year	TV series
2006	Kuroi Taiyou

=== DVDs ===
Year	DVD
2006	Prelude Sayoko Kohashi - Sugao no Kokuhaku
2007	Makeover
2007	Moisture
