= Ooh La La =

Ooh La La or Ooh La La La may refer to:

== Film and television ==
- "Ooh La La" (Odd Man Out episode), the final episode of the British sitcom Odd Man Out
- Ooh La La (film), a 2003 Kannada film
- Ooh La La La (film), a 2012 Tamil film
- Ooh La La! (TV series), a 1960s and 1970s BBC television series by Caryl Brahms and Ned Sherrin based on the plays of Georges Feydeau

== Music ==
=== Albums ===
- Ooh La La (Faces album) or the title song (see below), 1973
- Ooh La La (Suzi Lane album) or the title song, 1979
- Oooh La La! (Crash Test Dummies album), 2010
- Ooh La La: An Island Harvest, by Ronnie Lane, 2014
- Ooh La La (Guster album), 2024

=== Songs ===
- "Ooh La La" (Britney Spears song), 2013
- "Ooh La La" (Coolio song), 1997
- "Ooh La La" (Faces song), 1973
- "Ooh La La" (Goldfrapp song), 2005
- "Ooh La La" (Jessie Ware song), 2020
- "Ooh La La" (Shreya Ghoshal and Bappi Lahiri song), 2011
- "Ooh La La" (The Wiseguys song), 1998
- "Oh La La La" (TC Matic song), 1981
- "Oh La La La" (2 Eivissa song), 1997
- "Ooo La La La" (Teena Marie song), 1988
- "Paris (Ooh La La)", by Grace Potter and the Nocturnals, 2010
- "Uh La La La", by Alexia, 1997
- *Oh La La La (Jolin Tsai song), 2023
- "Ooh La La", by April Stevens with Nino Tempo, 1966
- "Ooh La La", by Bolland & Bolland, 1973
- "Ooh La La", by Frankie Avalon, B-side of "DeDe Dinah", 1957
- "Ooh La La", by Janelle Monáe from The Age of Pleasure, 2023
- "Ooh La La", by JJ Cale from Rewind: The Unreleased Recordings, 2007
- "Ooh La La", by Jobriath, 1974
- "Ooh La La", by John Cale from John Cale Comes Alive, 1984
- "Ooh La La", by Johnny Pearson, 1962
- "Ooh La La", by Normie Rowe, 1966
- "Ooh La La", by Ohio Express, 1970
- "Ooh La La", by Run the Jewels, featuring Greg Nice and DJ Premier from RTJ4, 2020
- "Ooh La La", by Sonu Kakkar, Neha Kakkar, and Tony Kakkar from the film Shubh Mangal Zyada Saavdhan, 2020
- "Ooh La La", by Steel Magnolia from Steel Magnolia, 2011
- "Ooh La La", by Tinashe from Joyride, 2018
- "Ooh La La", by the Venetians, 1984
- "Ooh La-La!", by Girls' Generation from Girls' Generation, 2007
- "Ooh La La (I Can't Get over You)", by Perfect Gentlemen, 1990
- "Oo La La La", by Cheap Trick from One on One, 1982
- "Ooh La La La", by Exo from Don't Mess Up My Tempo, 2018
- "Ooh La La La", by Nobody's Angel from Nobody's Angel, 2000
- "Ooh La La La La", by Nadel Paris, 2017
- "Ooh Ooh La La La", by The Raincoats from Moving, 1983
- "Ooo La La", by Robin Thicke from Blurred Lines, 2013
- "Oo La La Hugh", by Sting, from his EP The Soul Cages and the 2021 expanded reissue edition of his album The Soul Cages, 1991
- "(Let's Go Dancing) Ooh La La La", by Kool & the Gang from As One, 1982
- "Manna Madurai (Ooh La La La)", by Unni Menon, K. S. Chitra, and Srinivas from the film Minsara Kanavu, 1997
