= More More =

More More may refer to:

- More More (EP), a 2007 EP by Junkie XL
- More More (song), a 2014 song by Ai Otsuka
- More More, a song by I.O.I from the EP Miss Me?
