= Demagogue (song) =

Single by Urban Dance Squad

from the album Persona Non Grata
- B-side: "Alienated (Instrumental)"; "Demuffgogue"; "Downer (Bordeaux Live 24-06-93)"
- Released: 5 April 1994
- Studio: Ridge Farm Studios, Studio 4 Recording
- Genre: Rap metal
- Length: 4:06
- Label: BMG Ariola Benelux / Virgin
- Songwriters: Michel Schoots, Patrick Tilon, René van Barneveld, Silvano Matadin
- Producers: Phil Nicolo, Stiff Johnson

Urban Dance Squad singles chronology
"Grand Black Citizen" (1992)	"Demagogue" (1994)	"Candy Strip Experience" (1994)

"Demagogue" is a single by Dutch band Urban Dance Squad. It was released as the lead single for the band's third studio album, Persona Non Grata. It is a rap metal song. The song reached number 31 on the Dutch Charts, becoming their highest-charting song in the region. It also reached number 38 on the Belgian charts.

The single was released by Virgin Records in the United States on 7 March 1995, to coincide with a limited tour of small clubs in America. The song received airplay on college, metal and modern rock stations in the United States but failed to chart on any of the mainstream music charts.

The B-side to the single contained two main remixes by the Dust Brothers, a metal style and a hip-hop version. The song's video also received airplay on MTV.

Rick Anderson at Allmusic wrote: "Demagogue, the album's opener and centerpiece, is an utterly bracing concoction of raw-throated rap and spare, bright metal guitar, all underlaid with minimalist funk drums."

== Track listing ==
1. "Demagogue" (4:06)
2. "Alienated (Instrumental)" (5:44)
3. "Demuffgogue" (4:33)
4. "Downer (Bordeaux Live 24-06-93)" (10:36)
