= Persona Non Grata (Urban Dance Squad album) =

Studio album by Urban Dance Squad
- Released: April 1994
- Length: 45:53
- Label: Virgin

Urban Dance Squad chronology
Life 'n Perspectives of a Genuine Crossover (1991)	Persona Non Grata (1994)	Planet Ultra (1996)

Persona Non Grata is the third studio release by the Dutch rap rock band Urban Dance Squad, released in April 1994 by Virgin Records. With the departure of DJ DNA, the band took a more aggressive approach than on their previous two albums, resulting in a largely heavy metal-influenced album. The stylistic change resulted in some moderate European success. The song "Demagogue" became a European club hit. The band can be seen performing the album's track "Good Grief!" in the 1995 film, Hackers.

== Track listing ==
Side A
No.	Title	Length
1.	"Demagogue"	4:14
2.	"Good Grief!"	4:31
3.	"No Honestly!"	3:28
4.	"Alienated"	5:18
5.	"Selfsufficient Snake"	5:29
Total length:		23:00

Side B
No.	Title	Length
1.	"Candy Strip Exp-"	4:51
2.	"(Some) Chitchat"	5:07
3.	"Selfstyled"	3:17
4.	"Downer"	9:38
Total length:		22:53

The compact disc edition adds the tracks "Burnt Up Cigarette", "Mugshot" and "Hangout".

== Charts ==
=== Weekly charts ===
Chart (1994)	Peak position
Dutch Albums (Album Top 100)	7
German Albums (Offizielle Top 100)	83
Swiss Albums (Schweizer Hitparade)	42

=== Year-end charts ===
Chart (1994)	Position
Dutch Albums (Album Top 100)	91
