= Booming Back at You =

Studio album by Junkie XL
- Released: 11 March 2008
- Length: 53:54
- Label: Artwerk
- Producer: Junkie XL

Junkie XL chronology
Today (2006)	Booming Back at You (2008)	Synthesized (2012)

Singles from Booming Back at You
- 1. "More" Released: 25 September 2007; 2. "Cities in Dust" Released: 6 May 2008

Booming Back at You is the fifth studio album by Dutch electronic musician, remixer and producer Tom Holkenborg, better known as Junkie XL. It was released on 11 March 2008 by Artwerk, the joint venture of video game developer Electronic Arts and music company Nettwerk. The album was moderately successful in the charts, reaching number eleven in the Billboard Top Electronic Albums and becoming Junkie's first album to chart in the United States. The song "More" has been featured in the soundtrack of video game Need for Speed: ProStreet, "Mad Pursuit" was featured in the film 21 and the video game UEFA Euro 2008 and FIFA 09, and "Cities in Dust" was featured in the episode "Woman On the Verge" of the television series Gossip Girl and the video game Burnout Paradise.

== Release ==
After the release of his previous album Today, Junkie XL announced that he was no longer signed to the record label Roadrunner Records, and that all future albums would be self-released. However, by March 2007 video game developer Electronic Arts and music company Nettwerk announced their new joint venture, the record label Artwerk, to which they had already signed Junkie as their "flagship artist". Junkie had previously appeared on several EA game soundtracks, and even produced the soundtrack to Forza Motorsport, making him an ideal candidate. Artwerk announced their first studio album release with Junkie, Booming Back at You, in December. The title "Booming Back at You" was inspired by Junkie's fellow producers, Freq Nasty and Yonderboi. They also confirmed the album's first single "More", which was already available for download from various retailers and had been featured in the soundtrack of Need for Speed: ProStreet. The song Mad Pursuit, which features Electrocute, was featured on the soundtrack of the EA Sports game, UEFA Euro 2008 and FIFA 09. The album itself was released on 11 March 2008 in the Netherlands and the United States.

== Critical reception ==
Professional ratings
Review scores
Source	Rating
Allmusic	link
Alternative Press	(7/10)
Billboard	(favourable) link
Melt	5/5 stars
Q	3/5 stars
Stereology	link
Tiny Mix Tapes	link
Uncut	3/5 stars
Under the Radar	(5/10)
URB	link

Booming Back at You has received mixed, but generally positive reviews from a wide range of professional music critics. David Jeffries, a reviewer for Allmusic, described the album as "reliable and unoriginal", and said that it was "...not enough to raise him above 'the guy who remixed Elvis' and no great disappointment either". More favourably, Billboard writer Kerri Mason praised Junkie XL for creating "a fully realized, addictive long-player", and related some songs on the album to British electronic duo Goldfrapp. Music magazine Q said that some of the songs had "a slightly dated stadium-house feel", but conceded that "when [Junkie] thrills, he truly thrills".

== Chart performance ==
Booming Back at You enjoyed some moderate success in the 2008 album charts. On 22 March it debuted in the Dutch Album Chart, peaking at number 59 and remaining in the chart for three weeks. It then entered the Billboard Top Electronic Albums chart at number eleven on 29 March, becoming the first album by Junkie XL to chart in the United States.

Chart (2008)	Peak position
Dutch Album Chart	59
US Billboard Top Electronic Albums	11

== Track listing ==
No.	Title	Writer(s)	Length
1.	"Booming Right at You"	Tom Holkenborg	4:03
2.	"Cities in Dust" (Siouxsie and the Banshees cover featuring Lauren Rocket)	Budgie, Steven Severin, Siouxsie Sioux	4:19
3.	"You Make Me Feel So Good"	Holkenborg	4:37
4.	"Stratosphere"	Holkenborg	4:58
5.	"Mad Pursuit" (featuring Electrocute)	Holkenborg, Nicole Morier, Gus Seyffert	4:17
6.	"More" (featuring Lauren Rocket)	Lucas Banker, Holkenborg	6:01
7.	"1967 Poem" (featuring Steve Aoki)	Steve Aoki, Holkenborg	3:51
8.	"Zage"	Holkenborg	4:54
9.	"Clash"	Andre Ettema, Holkenborg	5:07
10.	"New Toy" (featuring Bram Inscore and Nicole Morier)	Holkenborg, Morier	4:21
11.	"No Way" (featuring Lauren Rocket)	Banker, Holkenborg	3:28
12.	"Not Enough" (featuring Willoughby and Nicole Morier)	Holkenborg, Morier, Seyffert	4:06
Total length:			53:54

== Personnel ==
The following people contributed to Booming Back at You.

- Tom Holkenborg – writing, production, performance, arrangement, mixing, mastering
- Andre Ettema – writing, sound design
- Steve Aoki – writing, production, vocals (track 7)
- Lucas Banker – writing, production
- Budgie – writing
- Sam Estes – sound design
- Olaf Heine – photography
- Bram Inscore – vocals (track 10)
- Nicole Morier – vocals (tracks 5, 10, 12)
- Lauren Rocket – vocals (tracks 2, 6, 11)
- Sargent 666 – keyboards (tracks 1–5, 10–12), bass (tracks 3, 5)
- Steven Severin – writing
- Siouxsie Sioux – writing
- Tommy Vext – vocals (track 1)
- Willoughby – vocals (track 12)
- Toshi Yanagi – guitar (tracks 1, 2, 4, 11, 12)
