= Deeper Shade of Soul =

Single by Urban Dance Squad

from the album Mental Floss for the Globe
- B-side: "Man on the Corner"
- Released: 1990
- Recorded: May–July 1989 at I.C.P. STUDIOS, Brussels
- Length: 4:28
- Label: Ariola
- Songwriters: Patrick Tilon; Silvano Matadin; René van Barneveld; Arjen de Vreede; Michel Schoots; Ray Baretto
- Producer: J.M.A.

"Deeper Shade of Soul" is the debut single by Dutch band Urban Dance Squad. It was taken from their debut album Mental Floss for the Globe and samples the Ray Barretto song he recorded in 1968 with a similar name ("A Deeper Shade of Soul"). Originally released in 1990, the single reached number 21 on the Billboard Hot 100 in March 1991 and stayed on the chart for 18 weeks. In the United States it is the song for which the band is best known, being their only hit single.

== Track listing ==
1. "Deeper Shade of Soul" – 4:28
2. "Man on the Corner" – 3:38

== Charts ==
Chart performance for "Deeper Shade of Soul"
Chart (1989–1991)	Peak position
Australia (ARIA)	56
Netherlands (Single Top 100)	52
US Billboard Hot 100	21
