= Paul Couter =

Belgian guitarist (1949–2021)

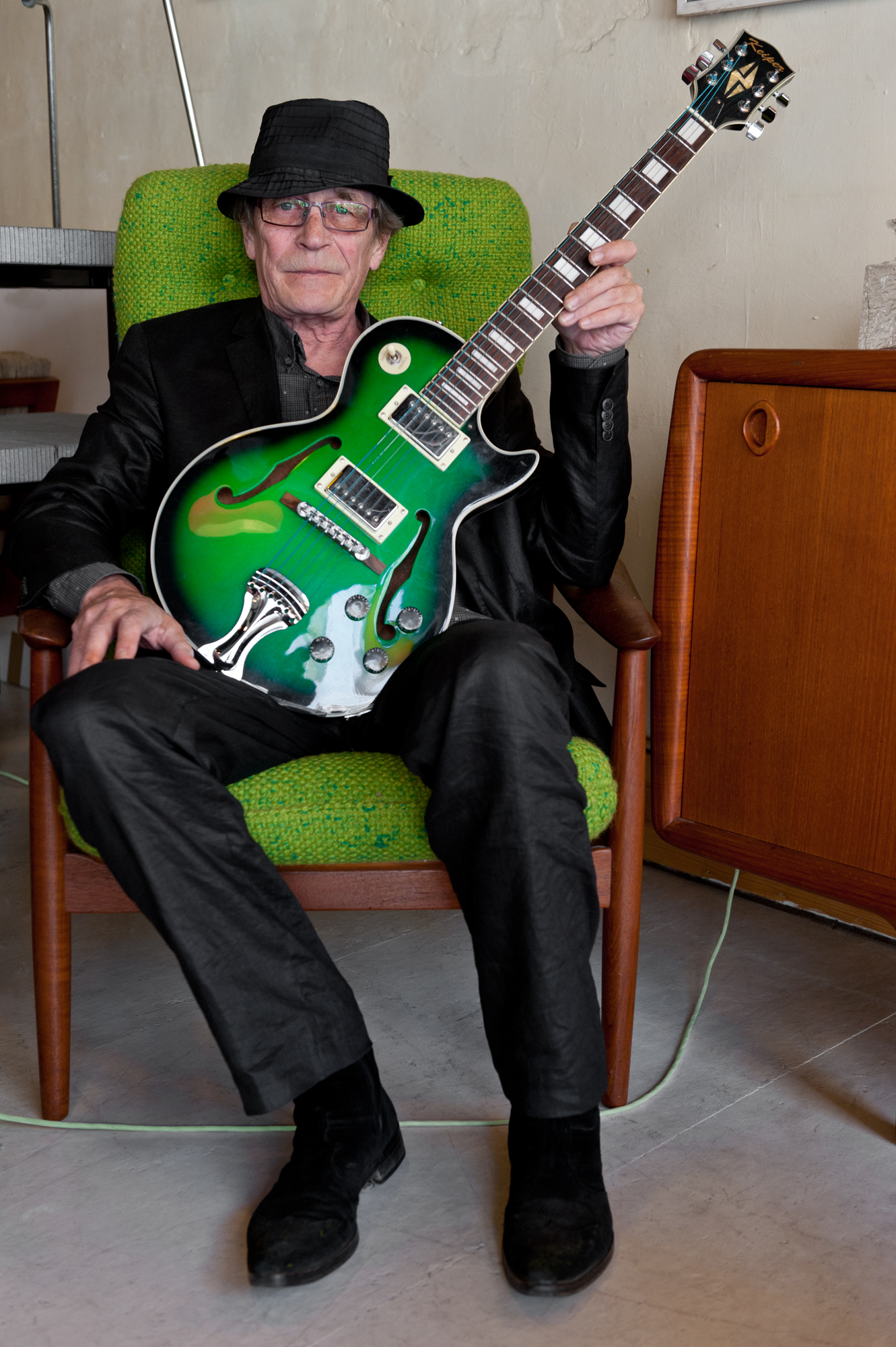
- Born: Paul Decoutere; 7 February 1949; Zeebrugge, Belgium
- Died: 27 April 2021 (aged 72); Ghent, Belgium
- Occupation: Guitarist

Paul Decoutere, known under the name Paul Couter (7 February 1949 – 27 April 2021), was a Belgian guitarist. He played in Freckleface, Tjens Couter and TC Matic.

Biography

Paul Decoutere was born in Izegem while his heavily pregnant mother was visiting relatives there, but he grew up on the Belgian coast. His parents ran a café in Knokke, and after their divorce, he moved with his mother and stepfather to Zeebrugge.

From the age of nine, Decoutere played the guitar. He earned a diploma in metalworking from VTI Oostende, but he was soon able to make money as a musician. Starting in the summer of 1967, he played with various cover bands and dance orchestras along the entire coast, performing in restaurants and at campsites. That same year, he met Arno Hintjens, a native of Ostend. The two became friends, occasionally played together, and in 1972 they formed the band Freckleface. Couter was the guitarist, Arno the singer. The other members were Eddy Storm (drums), later replaced by Jean Lamoot, and founder Paul Vandecasteele (bass and vocals).

Later that same year, the group disbanded, but with the same members they formed Tjens Couter—named after Arno’s and Paul’s surnames. In 1980, they changed their name to T.C. Matic, but after only a few months, Paul Couter left the band, as the new musical direction did not appeal to him. He was replaced by Jean-Marie Aerts.

Couter continued making music in the following years. At one point, he returned to Paris as a street musician ("busker"). He also formed the band Partisan with Ferre Baelen and ran several cafés in Zeebrugge. In the 1980s, he moved to Ghent, where, together with Jo Van Groeningen, he helped establish the music café Charlatan.

Until his death, Paul Couter remained active as a musician, especially in the Ghent area. He released several CDs, although they were not distributed commercially. His final album was released in March 2021, while he was staying in the palliative care ward of AZ Sint-Lucas hospital, where he was being treated for terminal cancer. He died there on 27 April 2021 at the age of 72.
