= Quantum Redshift =

2002 video game

- Developer: Curly Monsters
- Publisher: Microsoft Game Studios
- Designer: Nick Burcombe
- Platform: Xbox
- Release: NA: September 17, 2002; EU: October 4, 2002; JP: November 21, 2002
- Genre: Futuristic racing
- Modes: Single-player, multiplayer

Quantum Redshift is a video game for the Xbox console, developed by Curly Monsters and published by Microsoft Game Studios in 2002. The game is a futuristic racing game with the addition of combat and character rivalries that influence competitive races. Quantum Redshift was conceived as a spiritual successor to the racing game Wipeout and was developed by several former Psygnosis staff who worked on the game. The game's publication faced challenges, as Curly Monsters staff voiced creative differences regarding packaging and marketing by Microsoft Game Studios. The game received mixed reviews from critics, with praise directed at the game's visual presentation and smooth framerate, and criticism towards the lack of distinctive and original features in its design and gameplay compared to its contemporaries. The game was commercially unsuccessful, leading to the discontinuation of a planned sequel and the dissolution of Curly Monsters in 2003.

== Gameplay ==
Players race futuristic hovercraft named SPARCs in Quantum Redshift.

Set one hundred years in the future, Quantum Redshift is a racing game where high-speed races are held on hovercraft known as SPARCs, or single-person armed racing crafts. Races are held across a cast of sixteen selectable characters over eight stages, with each stage featuring two alternate routes. On the track, players have offensive weapons, including a homing and non-homing weapon, and overshields to combat competitors during races. Races also feature color-coded power-ups on the track that charge weapons and shields. Players are able to use points to augment their ship between races, with points earned by winning events, collecting power-ups or defeating opponents.

The game features four modes of play. 'Tournament' mode involves the completion of a series of events. Tournaments are offered in increasing scales of difficulty, with Novice and Amateur modes unlocked initially, and higher difficulty modes increasing the speed of the vehicles during races. Each selectable character in this mode has a rival, with additional points awarded to destroying a rival's vehicle in a race. Upon completion of the tournament, a one-on-one 'Nemesis Challenge' race is staged against the player's rival, allowing them to unlock playing as the rival. 'Time Attack' is a solo timed single race in which laps can be recorded as a 'ghost' for others to compete against. 'Quick Race' is a single race against computer opponents on an unlocked track. 'Multiplayer' mode supports local split-screen races for two to four players.

== Development and release ==
Quantum Redshift was developed by independent studio Curly Monsters, a British company founded in 1998 by six former Psygnosis staff members. Several development staff, including Nick Burcombe, Lee Carus-Wescott and Andy Satterthwaite, had worked on the similar 1995 Psygnosis racing video game Wipeout. Developer Neil Thompson stated the game was conceived to "maximise the Wipeout connection", with a design pitch accepted by Microsoft for the launch of the Xbox with a development budget of one million dollars. Microsoft leveraged several promotional partnerships to boost the profile of the game, including contracting Dutch musician Junkie XL to develop sixteen tracks for the soundtrack of the game. Quantum Redshift was Junkie XL's first video game project, who proceeded to compose tracks for games including Forza Motorsport. Microsoft also engaged Satoshi Ueda, who had worked on the Resident Evil and Street Fighter series, to develop assets for characters and cinematics in the game, including a promotional comic book released for E3 2002 to preview the game.

Promotion and release of Quantum Redshift was troubled, with creative differences between Microsoft and the development team. Although Curly Monsters retained creative control over the game itself, Microsoft exercised control over the release of the game. The working title, Neon, was changed to Quantum Redshift over concerns of copyright infringement with the Chrysler Neon. The development team also expressed strong disapproval towards decisions made by Microsoft on the cinematics and box art of the game, with Neil Thompson stating the team were "desperately unhappy" and "immensely disappointed" with the final art direction.

=== Sales ===
Quantum Redshift was not commercially successful, with the game performing poorly in comparison to Wipeout Fusion, released by Psygnosis successor Studio Liverpool the same year. However, poor sales performance had a significant impact on Curly Monsters, with Microsoft Game Studios abandoning its contract with the studio for a second title, leading to cancellation of a planned sequel. Following this, the company disbanded in February 2003, with Andy Satterthwaite reflecting "while the games were great and reviewed well, they didn't make enough cash, and we ended up calling it quits in 2003 before we had to put our houses on the line." In the year following release, the game received a minor boost of sales, peaking in the eighth position on Xbox sales charts in the week of 15 November 2003.

== Reception ==
Reception

Aggregate score
Aggregator	Score
Metacritic	70%

Review scores
Publication	Score
Electronic Gaming Monthly	6.0 / 6.5 / 6.0
Eurogamer	8/10
GameRevolution	B−
GameSpot	7.1
GameSpy	63%
IGN	6.2
Play	4/5
X-Play	3/5
Xbox Magazine (XBM)	6/10
Xbox Nation (XBN)	6/10

Quantum Redshift received "mixed or average reviews" from publications according to review aggregator Metacritic. Critics praised the visual presentation of Quantum Redshift as a highlight of the game, with a focus on the visual effects and framerate. Writing for Game Revolution, Shawn Sanders praised the visual presentation, stating the game demonstrated the technical capabilities of the console, highlighting the "bump-mapping, snazzy water effects, lush and expansive environments (and) silky smooth framerate." Similarly, Ryan Davis of GameSpot praised the graphics as "outstanding", focusing upon the game's "lighting and particle effects, motion blur and bump-mapping", although noting some effects are "used liberally to the point that the novelty wears off sooner than it should". Hilary Goldstein of IGN described the graphics as "blazingly fast", but noted the courses were static and had few competitors, writing "While the game is pretty, it's not hard to see why when considering what little is truly going on."

Reviewers expressed mixed opinions on the track design. Louis Bedigian of GameZone praised the design as "unique", finding them to have "a lot of room to move around" and remarking "the larger scope adds to the depth and realistic feel of the courses". Zach Meston of GameSpy described the tracks as "gorgeous", although found them "sterile" and lacking animation. Davis praised the inclusion of different surfaces and shortcuts, but found most tracks were not "unique and interesting" and "seem inspired more by conventional rally racing games". Goldstein similarly remarked that the track design was "boring" and lacked activity, stating "the tracks don't seem to make much of any sense in terms of the rest of the game" and were largely similar to other racing games.

Several critics remarked that the game was unoriginal and lacked distinctive features. Electronic Gaming Monthly described the game as "generic" and "fun, if uninspired", finding the game failed to add "anything new or revolutionary to the gameplay", citing the lack of weapons and the "bland character designs and uninspired story cut-scenes". Similarly describing the game as "simplistic", Goldstein critiqued the "limited" and "plain" use of power-ups in the game, finding them to meet a bare minimum of expected features. Andrew Bub of XPlay also found the game lacked "inspiration and originality", citing the "generic" story. Sanders stated the game had few faults, but did not introduce many new features in comparison to other games in the genre. Davis similarly noted the gameplay offered "nothing out of the ordinary."

=== Retrospective reception ===
Quantum Redshift received mixed retrospective attention, with critics acknowledging its poor critical and commercial performance. Kristan Reed of Eurogamer positively evaluated the game as a "strangely overlooked" title and "cult classic" for the Xbox, stating it was "the natural successor to Wipeout and the best looking game of its type, with smooth widescreen visuals". In contrast, writing for The Escapist, Jim Rossignol evaluated the game as a "flawed and doomed project", noting that despite the game's distinctive visual and sylistic features, its commercial failure was evident and attributed its shortcomings to unfavorable comparisons with Wipeout. Richard Moss of Polygon described the game as "lacking the inspiration and coherence of its spiritual predecessor".
