= TC Matic =

Belgian rock band (1980–1986)

- TC Matic in 1980: From left: Ferre Baelen, Jean-Marie Aerts, Arno Hintjens, Serge Feys, Rudy Cloet

Background information
- Origin: Belgium
- Genres: Rock
- Years active: 1980–1986
- Past members: Arno Hintjens; Jean-Marie Aerts; Paul Couter; Ferre Baelen; Rudy Cloet; Serge Feys; Michael Peet

TC Matic (also stylised as T.C. Matic) was a Belgian rock band founded in 1980 in Brussels. Centered on singer Arno Hintjens and guitarist Jean-Marie Aerts, the band played a kind of music sometimes referred to as "eurorock", containing various styles including new wave, blues, funk, hard rock, avant-garde and French chanson. The band released four studio albums and attained a measure of commercial and popular success, and disbanded in 1986.

== History ==
The band has its origin in the duo Tjens-Couter, composed of Arno Hintjens and guitarist Paul Couter, which played rhythm and blues since the early 1970s, and in 1974 were augmented with Ferre Baelen (bass) and Rudy Cloet (drums), and in 1977 with Serge Feys (keyboards). Two albums were released, Who Cares (1975) and Plat du Jour (1978). In 1980, the group was renamed TC Matic after the Yugoslav surrealist poet Dušan Matić. Decoutere was soon replaced by Jean-Marie Aerts, who cooperated with Hintjens in the majority of the band's compositions and produced the first three albums. Their debut album, TC Matic, was described as a mixture of Killing Joke and Gang of Four; they scored an early hit in Belgium with "Oh La La La" in 1981, and another with "Putain putain" from 1983's Choco.

In 1984, the Dutch bass player Michael Peet replaced Ferre Baelen. In 1985, the band toured Europe, opening for the Simple Minds, a tour which proved that Belgian bands could attain commercial success outside the country. A final album, Ye Ye (1985), was produced by Howard Gray. The band broke up in 1986.

== After the breakup ==
Arno Hintjes started a solo career, under the name Arno. He continued to cooperate with Jean-Marie Aerts, who went on to work mainly as a producer (for Jo Lemaire and the Urban Dance Squad, among others), and with two other ex-TC Matic-members, drummer Rudy Cloet and keyboard player Serge Feys.

== Members ==
- Arno Hintjens - vocals
- Jean-Marie Aerts - guitar
- Ferre Baelen - bass (1980-1984)
- Rudy Cloet - drums
- Serge Feys - keyboards
- Michael Peet - bass (1984-1986)

== Discography ==
- TC Matic (1981)
- L'Apache (1982)
- Choco (1983)
- Putain Putain (1983)
- Ye Ye (1985)
