= Big Sounds of the Drags =

Studio album by Junkie XL
- Released: October 14, 1999; July 24, 2000 (reissue)
- Recorded: 1999
- Genres: Electronic; trip hop; big beat; house; electronic rock
- Labels: Roadrunner; Manifesto (UK only); Attic (Canada only)
- Producer: Junkie XL

Junkie XL chronology
Saturday Teenage Kick (1997)	Big Sounds of the Drags (1999)	Radio JXL: A Broadcast from the Computer Hell Cabin (2003)

Singles from Big Sounds of the Drags
- 1. "Check Your Basic Groove" Released: 1999; 2. "Zerotonine" Released: 2000; 3. "Action Radius" Released: 2000; 4. "Love Like Razorblade" Released: 2000

Big Sounds of the Drags is the second album by the Dutch electronic musician Junkie XL, released on Roadrunner Records in 1999. The album artwork features RC Sherman's 1977 Chevy Vega Funny Car dubbed 'Black Magic'.

== Reception ==
Professional ratings
Review scores
Source	Rating
Allmusic	link

The tracks "Synasthesia", "Dance USA" and "Future in Computer Hell (Part II)" were included in the video games Test Drive: Overdrive (2002), and "Action Radius" in Need for Speed: Underground (2003). "Action Radius" was released as a single upon its re-release in 2000. "Zerotonine" was played over the end credits of the 2002 motion picture Buying the Cow.

== Track listing ==
=== 1999 edition ===
1. "Check Your Basic Groove" (5:09)
2. "Action Radius" (3:53)
3. "Synasthesia" (7:41)
4. "Power of Big Slacks" (3:25)
5. "Zerotonine" (4:01)
6. "Love Like Razorblade" (6:08)
7. "Legion" (4:36)
8. "Dance USA" (3:23)
9. "Gettin' Lost" (6:18)
10. "Black Jack" (3:07)
11. "Next Plateau" (5:00)
12. "Future in Computer Hell (Part II)" (21:45)

=== 2000 edition ===
1. "Check Your Basic Groove" (5:07)
2. "Synasthesia" (7:42)
3. "Power of Big Slacks" (3:25)
4. "Zerotonine" (4:02)
5. "Love Like Razorblade" (6:07)
6. "Legion" (4:36)
7. "Disco 2000" (4:26)
8. "Future in Computer Hell (Part II)" (7:16)
9. "Bon Voyage" (7:05)
10. "Power of Big Slacks (Reprise)" (11:06)
11. "Gettin' Lost" (7:14)
12. "Black Jack" (3:08)
13. "Next Plateau" (4:51)

== Personnel ==
=== Junkie XL ===
- Tom Holkenborg – producer, writer (except for tracks 2, 4, 5, 6, 7, 11), engineering, mixing, programming, keyboards, samples, bass
- Patrick Tilon (Silver Surfering Rudeboy) – lead vocals, writing ("Action Radius", "Power of Big Slacks", "Zerotonine", "Love Like Razorblade", "Legion", "Next Plateau")

=== Additional musicians ===
- Rene van der Zee – guitars
- John Themis – guitars
- Keeling Lee – guitars
- Max Cavalera – guitars, keyboards
- Dino Cazares – guitars
- Klaas Ten Holt – guitars, strings ("Synthasesia", "Future in Computer Hell (Part 2)")
- Greg Wilson – turntables
- Baz Mattie – drums
- Guy Moon – drums
- Sander van der Heide – mastering (except for "Power of Big Slacks (reprise)")
- Tim Young – mastering ("Power of Big Slacks (reprise)")
