= Jean-Marie Aerts =

Belgian guitarist and producer (1951–2024)

- Aerts in 2022

Background information
- Born: 25 May 1951; Zeebrugge, Belgium
- Died: 20 April 2024 (aged 72); Leuven, Belgium
- Genres: New wave, pop rock, jazz, chanson, fusion
- Occupation(s): Instrumentalist, producer
- Instrument: Guitar
- Years active: 1974–2024
- Formerly of: T.C. Matic, Raymond van het Groenewoud

Jean-Marie Aerts (25 May 1951 – 20 April 2024) was a Belgian guitarist and producer, best known as the guitar player for TC Matic. Aerts was a session musician who had worked with Kaz Lux, Raymond van het Groenewoud, and Plastic Bertrand when he joined Arno Hintjens in TC Matic in 1980, replacing Paul Decoutere. He also produced the band's first three albums; during his tenure with the band he produced other artists' albums as well, including Luc van Acker's KAZ (1982) and Arbeid Adelt!'s ''Jonge Helden (1983). After TC Matic broke up he continued as a producer, working with artists including DJ DNA, Jo Lemaire, and the Urban Dance Squad, for whom he produced the groundbreaking debut album Mental Floss for the Globe. Aerts died on 20 April 2024, at the age of 72.
