= DJ DNA =

- DJ DNA in his studio at Kytopia, Utrecht, The Netherlands

Background information
- Birth name: Arjen de Vreede
- Also known as: DJ Donotask
- Origin: Utrecht, Netherlands
- Occupation(s): Producer, teacher
- Instrument: Turntables
- Years active: 1979-present
- Labels: Kytopia, Polydor, Arista, Ariola, Triple X,
- Website: www.djdna.net

Arjen de Vreede (born 26 April 1962 in Utrecht, The Netherlands), known by his stage name DJ DNA, is a Dutch DJ and producer. At age seventeen, he started as a DJ, and became a pioneer in the Dutch music scene playing hip hop, house, acid house and techno in renowned Dutch clubs such as the Roxy and the Vrije Vloer. He also co-founded the band Urban Dance Squad.

After leaving the Urban Dance Squad he was in various bands like JMX and Stuurbaard Bakkebaard. He made remixes for a.o. Junkie XL (Action Radius) and De Jeugd van Tegenwoordig (De Stofzuiger).

His first solo album was released 21 September 2012 and features Kurtis Blow. The first single The Sum of the Sound was released June 2012. The second single I wanna B (funky) was released September 2012.

== Discography ==
Urban Dance Squad

- Mental Floss For The Globe (1989)
- Hollywood Live (1990)
- Life 'n Perspectives Of A Genuine Crossover (1991)
- Artantica (1999)

JMX

- Autonome (1999)
- Parbleu (2002)

Palinckx

- Momentum and Wag

Pow Ensemble

- The 13 Bar Blues

Defunkt

- One World

Stuurbaard Bakkebaard

- L'amour (2009)

Solo project

- The Sum of the Sound (2012) ft Kurtis Blow, Pax, Torre Florim (De Staat) and Janne Schra
