= Mad Max: Fury Road (soundtrack) =

2015 soundtrack album by Tom Holkenborg a.k.a. Junkie XL

Mad Max: Fury Road (Original Motion Picture Soundtrack)

Soundtrack album by Tom Holkenborg a.k.a. Junkie XL
- Released: 12 May 2015
- Recorded: The Simon Leadley Scoring Stage, Trackdown Studios, Sydney
- Genre: Film score
- Length: 71:01 (standard edition); 125:08 (deluxe edition)
- Label: WaterTower Music
- Producer: Tom Holkenborg

Tom Holkenborg a.k.a. Junkie XL chronology
Run All Night (2015)	Mad Max: Fury Road (Original Motion Picture Soundtrack) (2015)	Black Mass (2015)

Mad Max: Fury Road (Original Motion Picture Soundtrack) is a soundtrack album for the 2015 film, Mad Max: Fury Road, composed by Tom Holkenborg a.k.a. Junkie XL. It was released on 12 May 2015 through WaterTower Music.

A limited vinyl edition of the soundtrack was released by Mondo at the end of July 2015.

== Overview ==
Since Mad Max: Fury Road experienced a lengthy development, multiple composers were attached to the film at various times including John Powell and Marco Beltrami. In October 2013, it was officially announced that Tom Holkenborg a.k.a. Junkie XL would be composing the film's music. After being contacted by Warner Bros. Senior Vice President Darren Higman, Holkenborg flew to Sydney where he viewed a three-hour workprint of the film and met with director George Miller. Because of Holkenborg's work on 300: Rise of an Empire and his on-the-spot ideas for Mad Max: Fury Road, Miller hired him, and he immediately began work on writing the film's themes. "I got in August of 2013 and we [didn't finish] until August 2014," said Holkenborg. "When you're so early in the game, you have so much room of experimentation."

Similar to Brian May, who composed the scores to Mad Max and Mad Max 2, Holkenborg was inspired largely by the work of Bernard Herrmann. "One of my favorite time periods in film scoring is the 1940s and 1950s and in the early 60s during the golden days of Bernard Herrmann and the start of Ennio Morricone," said Holkenborg. "There was so much rich material written then and George and I wondered why more of that wasn’t being used in film scores today." Holkenborg also drew inspiration from the rock opera genre, utilizing hundreds of drums and constructing electric guitar-driven themes.

Recorded at Trackdown Studios in Sydney, a majority of the score was performed by Holkenborg himself. "I basically played everything myself except for the strings and the brass that we recorded as a section in Sydney," said Holkenborg "I worked with Nick Zinner, the guitarist from the Yeah Yeah Yeahs on a couple of cues. He's got this really wonderful tone, so we added some guitars."

The score was later played for the film's actors during ADR sessions to gain a musical awareness of the film. "I know that George played the music to the actors when they came in to do the ADR," said Holkenborg. "Once they saw rough cuts of their scenes with the music that I did, they got a whole different idea of how they should have handled the ADR."

== Reception ==
Professional ratings
Review scores
Source	Rating
AllMusic	4/5 stars
Film Music Fan	B−
Film.Music.Media	5/5 stars
Filmtracks.com	2/5 stars
Movie Wave	2.5/5 stars
Sputnikmusic	4.5/5 stars

The musical score has received generally positive reviews. Andy Kellman of AllMusic called the score "rife with tension", describing Holkenborg's "thunderous sounds – battering drums, screaming guitars, urgent strings and horns, all physical and skillfully orchestrated – to match the intense action." Jørn Tillnes of Soundtrack Geek praised the soundtrack, writing, "It's rare when a 2+ hour score feels short, but in this case, I could easily listen to it for many hours more." Tillnes added, "The world needs composers like Junkie XL, someone who has the guts to go all out... At the same time, he has shown he can go the complete opposite and create beautiful symphonies on its own without relying on the action music."

Oktay Ege Kozak of The Playlist described it as a "sublime and energetic score" that "finds a delicate balance between percussion-driven action and a striking orchestral score that resembles old school Hollywood epics." Conversely, James Southall of Movie Wave wrote, "The repetitive action cues which form the bulk of the album are too off putting: there just aren’t enough ways found of making one piece of noisy drumming sound different enough from another piece of noisy drumming to make me want to listen to it, which isn’t necessarily a problem in the film but is of course a big one on the album."

Hans Zimmer, a frequent collaborator of Holkenborg, called the score "absolutely phenomenal and mind-blowingly brilliant."

== Track listing ==
=== Standard edition ===
All music is composed by Tom Holkenborg a.k.a. Junkie XL.

No.	Title	Length
1.	"Survive"	1:30
2.	"Escape"	2:14
3.	"Immortan's Citadel"	8:41
4.	"Blood Bag"	2:30
5.	"Spikey Cars"	3:11
6.	"Storm Is Coming"	5:36
7.	"We Are Not Things"	1:37
8.	"Water"	3:15
9.	"The Rig"	4:13
10.	"Brothers in Arms"	4:22
11.	"The Bog"	6:58
12.	"Redemption"	1:45
13.	"Many Mothers"	5:15
14.	"Claw Trucks"	5:31
15.	"Chapter Doof" (Extended Version)	7:04
16.	"My Name Is Max" (Extended Version)	4:43
17.	"Let Them Up"	2:36
Total length:		71:01

=== Deluxe edition ===
All music is composed by Tom Holkenborg a.k.a. Junkie XL.

No.	Title	Length
1.	"Survive" (Extended Version)	1:40
2.	"Escape" (Extended Version)	3:28
3.	"Immortan's Citadel" (Extended Version)	8:58
4.	"Blood Bag" (Extended Version)	3:39
5.	"Buzzards Arrive"	1:26
6.	"Spikey Cars" (Extended Version)	4:08
7.	"Storm Is Coming" (Extended Version)	6:16
8.	"We Are Not Things" (Extended Version)	1:42
9.	"Water" (Extended Version)	6:25
10.	"The Rig" (Extended Version)	6:31
11.	"Into the Canyon"	2:49
12.	"Brothers in Arms" (Extended Version)	5:52
13.	"The Chase"	3:16
14.	"Moving On"	1:56
15.	"The Bog" (Extended Version)	12:32
16.	"Redemption"	1:45
17.	"Many Mothers" (Extended Version)	8:58
18.	"The Return to Nowhere"	5:17
19.	"Claw Trucks" (Extended Version)	5:43
20.	"Immortan"	11:10
21.	"Chapter Doof"	6:49
22.	"Walhalla Awaits"	2:40
23.	"My Name Is Max"	2:23
24.	"Let Them Up"	2:36
25.	"Mary Jo Bassa"	2:26
26.	"Coda"	4:43
Total length:		125:08

== Personnel ==
Credits adopted from liner notes:

Production

- Tom Holkenborg a.k.a. Junkie XL – composer, producer
- Christian Vorländer – additional music
- Stephen Perone – additional music programming

Management

- George Miller – executive album producer
- Darren Higman – executive in charge of music (Warner Bros. Pictures)
- Jason Linn – executive in charge of music (WaterTower Music)
- Lisa Margolis – music business affairs executive

Orchestration

- Emad Borjian – orchestration
- Elaine Beckett – orchestra recording coordinator
- Jessica Wells – orchestration services

Performers

- Tom Holkenborg – drums, percussion, guitars, bass & all synths
- Nick Zinner – additional guitars

Technical

- Music Mixed at Computer Hell Cabin Paradise, Encino, CA
- Tom Holkenborg – recorder, mixer
- Chris Jenkins – score rerecording mixer
- Bob Badami – score wrangler
- Ryan Rubin – additional editing
- Alex Gibson – additional editing

== Additional music ==
Additional music credited in Mad Max: Fury Road:

Title	Musician(s)	Key scenes/Notes
"Elegy for Rosa"	Eleni Karaindrou	Plays after The Splendid Angharad is killed.
"Refugee's Theme Symphonic Variation No. 1"	Eleni Karaindrou	Plays after the Rig comes across Furiosa's former clan.
"Messa Da Requiem - Dies Irae"	Giuseppe Verdi	Plays during the Bullet Farmer's nighttime attack on the Rig. The piece was also featured in the film's theatrical teaser trailer.
"Teardrop"	Massive Attack	Shots from the song's music video are shown during one of Max's visions.
"Out of Control"	Zebrahead featuring Man with a Mission	Plays during the end credits of the Japanese dub version only.

== Charts ==
Chart (2015)	Peak position
Australian Albums (ARIA)	92
Belgian Albums (Ultratop Wallonia)	197
