= Artantica =

Studio album by Urban Dance Squad
- Released: 1999
- Recorded: Autumn 1999 at Pablo y Pablo, Tienen & Orkater, Amsterdam
- Length: 59:51
- Label: Virgin
- Producers: Peer Rave, Theo Van Rock

Urban Dance Squad chronology
| Beograd Live (1997) | Artantica (1999) |

Professional ratings
Review scores
| Source | Rating |
|---|---|
| Allmusic | 4/5 stars |

Artantica is the fifth and final album by the Dutch rap rock band Urban Dance Squad, released in 1999 by Virgin Records. The album marked the return of DJ DNA, who had been absent on the band's two previous recordings. Stylistically the album is very diverse, with vocalist Rudeboy often singing and rapping in the same song. The single "Happy Go Fucked Up" became a minor hit in Europe. Not long after the release of the album, the band broke up.

== Track listing ==
Side A
| No. | Title | Length |
|---|---|---|
| 1. | "Step Off" | 5:20 |
| 2. | "Happy Go Fucked Up" | 4:55 |
| 3. | "Letter To Da Better" | 4:45 |
| Total length: | | 15:00 |

Side B
| No. | Title | Length |
|---|---|---|
| 1. | "Craftmatic Adjustable Girl" | 4:16 |
| 2. | "Bank Stock 6 Zeros" | 4:44 |
| 3. | "Hard-Headed Headstrong" | 4:18 |
| Total length: | | 13:19 |

Side C
| No. | Title | Length |
|---|---|---|
| 1. | "Fearless" | 3:59 |
| 2. | "Ghost Called Loneliness" | 3:44 |
| 3. | "Limousine" | 4:00 |
| 4. | "Artantica" | 3:47 |
| Total length: | | 15:30 |

Side D
| No. | Title | Length |
|---|---|---|
| 1. | "Chain-Locked To Nowhere" | 5:01 |
| 2. | "Q & A's On An O.D." | 3:50 |
| 3. | "Modern Woman" | 2:01 |
| 4. | "Music Entertainment" | 5:07 |
| Total length: | | 15:59 |
