= Life 'n Perspectives of a Genuine Crossover =

Studio album by Urban Dance Squad
- Released: 1991
- Genres: Rap rock; funk metal
- Length: 45:51
- Label: Ariola

Urban Dance Squad chronology
Mental Floss for the Globe (1989)	Life 'n Perspectives of a Genuine Crossover (1991)	Persona Non Grata (1994)

Life 'n Perspectives of a Genuine Crossover is the second album by the Dutch rap rock band Urban Dance Squad, released in 1991 by Ariola in Europe and Arista Records in the United States. The album showcases an even more diverse mix of music genres than their debut album, genres including hard rock, hip-hop, funk, blues, ska, Caribbean music and an Indian flavour on "Bureaucrat of Flaccostreet". AllMusic calls the album "aimless", particularly in comparison with their first album. Critic Steven Blush, who interviewed the band in New York just prior to the album's release, called it "stellar". The album peaked at number 190 on the Australian ARIA Chart.

The album, unhelped by a single (to the dismay of label boss Clive Davis), did not sell particularly well and the band was unhappy with the label's marketing efforts. The band left Arista and signed with Virgin Records.

== Track listing ==
Side A
No.	Title	Length
1.	"Comeback"	4:27
2.	"(Thru) the Gates of the Big Fruit"	4:15
3.	"Life 'N Perspectives I"	1:02
4.	"Son Of Tha Culture Clash"	3:28
5.	"Careless"	4:00
6.	"Life 'N Perspectives II"	1:14
7.	"Mr. EZway"	3:40
Total length:		22:06

Side B
No.	Title	Length
1.	"Harvey Quinnt"	3:32
2.	"Routine"	5:01
3.	"Life 'N Perspectives III"	0:56
4.	"For The Plasters"	4:27
5.	"Life 'N Perspectives IV (Derick & Brian's Song)"	1:22
6.	"Thru The Eyes Of Jason"	3:30
7.	"Bureaucrat Of Flaccostreet"	4:57
Total length:		23:45

The compact disc edition adds the tracks "Grand Black Citizen", "Duck Ska" and "Wino The Medicineman".
