= Today (Junkie XL album) =

Studio album by Junkie XL
- Released: April 18, 2006
- Length: 55:11
- Label: Ultra Records
- Producer: Junkie XL

Junkie XL chronology
Radio JXL: A Broadcast From the Computer Hell Cabin (2003)	Today (2006)	Booming Back at You (2008)

Professional ratings
Review scores
Source	Rating
About.com	link

Today is the fourth album by the Dutch electronic music producer Junkie XL (Tom Holkenborg). It was released in 2006 and features vocals by Nathan Mader and acoustic and electric guitars by Holkenborg on several tracks.

Honey is dedicated to and named after the mother of Holkenborg's former fiance.

== Track listing ==
No.	Title	Length
1.	"Youthful"	10:30
2.	"Mushroom"	6:43
3.	"Such A Tease"	5:52
4.	"Today"	6:37
5.	"Drift Away"	4:54
6.	"I've Got A Xerox To Copy"	5:54
7.	"Even In This Moment"	1:53
8.	"Yesterdays"	3:54
9.	"Honey"	3:51
10.	"We Become One"	4:46

== Miscellaneous ==
- The song "Today" was featured on the soundtrack for the video games Burnout Legends and Burnout Revenge, as well as ESPN commercials for Major League Soccer in 2008.
- Junkie XL's former fiance Carolyn sang on the track "I've Got a Xerox to Copy."
- Part of melody in "Even In This Moment" sounds the same when played backwards.
