= Oh La La La (TC Matic song) =

- 1982 UK vinyl single cover

Single by TC Matic

from the album TC Matic
- B-side: "Dancing Thoughts"
- Released: 1981
- Label: Parsley, Statik Records, EMI
- Songwriters: Arno Hintjens, Ferre Baelen, Rudy Cloet

Music video
- TC Matic - Oh La La La on YouTube

"Oh La La La" (originally spelled as "O La La La") is a 1981 song by Belgian rock band TC Matic. Written by Arno Hintjens, Ferre Baelen and Rudy Cloet, it appeared on their album TC Matic (1981) and was also released as a single, with "Dancing Thoughts" as the B-side. "Oh La La La" became a huge club hit, concert favorite and was always considered both the band as well as Arno Hintjens' signature song.

In 2012 the song was covered by Zita Swoon.

== Charts ==
Chart (1981)	Peak position
Belgium (Ultratop 50 Flanders)	20
