= Krystal Forscutt =

Australian model and reality TV contestant

Krystal Forscutt (now Hipwell)
- Born: Australia
- Occupations: former TV show contestant, model, personal trainer, waitress
- Known for: Big Brother Australia Housemate

Krystal Forscutt (married name Krystal Hipwell) is an Australian former model and reality television contestant. Since then she has gone onto work as a personal trainer and is the founder of a luxury holiday rental company 'Bunker Escapes' .

== Biography ==
=== Reality television ===
Forscutt previously modelled for men's magazines and came to prominence as a contestant in the Australian Big Brother series in 2006.

=== Modelling ===
Forscutt went on to appear regularly in Australian men's magazines Zoo Weekly, FHM and Ralph. She appeared in the video game Need for Speed: ProStreet, which makes her the first Australian to have a character in the game. The representatives of Electronic Arts approached Forscutt to appear in the new Need For Speed video game, after they spotted her in a bikini shoot in Zoo Weekly. Forscutt was flown to EA's Vancouver headquarters where she was photographed and filmed for artists to create her character, a starting girl in the race series.

=== Television and acting ===
In January 2008, Forscutt became a regular guest on the Bigpond GameArena Benny and Richie show, and in October appeared in an episode of Seven Network's Packed to the Rafters. In May 2009, Forscutt appeared in the music video for the Steve Forde song “Guns & Guitars”. Forscutt briefly pursued a movie career in Hollywood. As of 2010 she had relocated to Melbourne. On 29 July 2010, she made an appearance on The Matty Johns Show.

=== Music ===
In November 2010, Krystal Forscutt spoke to the Herald Sun about her upcoming venture in music. She stated that she was a part of a girl group called "Video Girl" and that the group had already recorded their debut album and were in the process of putting together a show to perform at gigs. Forscutt said she would sing and DJ in the group. The band was supposed to release music in 2011; however, music industry sources indicated that Forscutt's music career had been cut short.
