= Nadel Paris =

- Born: Paris, France
- Origin: Los Angeles, United States
- Genres: Dance, Pop
- Labels: EMI; Sound Plus

Nadel Paris (pronounced nuh-dell) is a French singer, songwriter, record producer, dancer, Electronic Dance Music (EDM) artist, and actor from Paris, based in Los Angeles. She is best known for her live shows and live renditions of her own songs.

== Early life and career ==
Nadel Paris was born in France to a mother who was a Christian Dior model and a father who was a psychotherapist.

She signed with EMI France at the age of 12. She released her debut album, Oooh La La La La, following her singles “Freedom” and the Billboard Dance charting title track. She primarily collaborates with producer DJ M whom she knows from childhood.

She performed at the Avalon Hollywood on November 30, 2017, alongside DJ Ray Rhodes.

Paris is a contributor to Medium and writes regularly about dance, music and singing.

== Discography ==
=== Charted singles ===
Title	Year	Peak chart positions	Album
Title	Year	US Club	Album
"Freedom (Remix)"	2016	38	Non-album singles
"Ooh La La La La" (featuring DJ M)	2017	31	Non-album singles
"Tell Mama"	2018	50	Non-album singles
