= Radio JXL: A Broadcast from the Computer Hell Cabin =

Studio album by Junkie XL
- Released: 2 June 2003
- Genres: Electronic; big beat; house; electronic rock
- Labels: Roadrunner; Universal (Canada only)
- Producer: Junkie XL

Junkie XL chronology
Big Sounds of the Drags (1999)	Radio JXL: A Broadcast from the Computer Hell Cabin (2003)	Today (2006)

Professional ratings
Review scores
Source	Rating
AllMusic	link
Rolling Stone	link

Radio JXL: A Broadcast from the Computer Hell Cabin is the third studio album by Dutch electronic music producer Junkie XL. Released in 2003, the double album features collaborations with a number of other artists. The songs on the first disc ("3PM") are generally short and vocally-driven much like modern pop, though many of them are more upbeat, with JXL relying on the more heavier electronic genres, including big beat and house. The second disc ("3AM") consists mostly of progressive house songs. Disc one is available in Australia as a single disc version with the same name as the double-disc version. On the CD, it has "3PM". The cover artwork is the same as the double disc version. This single disc version of "3PM" is the European version, containing a total of 19 tracks, instead of the US release of 17 tracks. Two additional albums were released from the website radiojxl.com, which has since been repurposed. These albums were entitled 7AM Ambient and 7AM Dance.

== Track listing ==
=== 2xCD, US version – "3PM" and "3AM" ===
==== Disc 1 – "3PM" ====
No.	Title	Length
1.	"Intro 3PM"	0:50
2.	"Tennis"	6:20
3.	"Crusher" (featuring Saffron)	5:29
4.	"Don't Wake Up Policeman" (featuring Peter Tosh and Friends)	4:53
5.	"Reload" (featuring Dave Gahan)	4:54
6.	"Spirits" (featuring Saffron)	4:23
7.	"Angels" (featuring Gary Numan)	4:19
8.	"Perfect Blue Sky" (featuring Robert Smith)	4:11
9.	"Between These Walls" (featuring Anouk)	4:12
10.	"Access to the Excess" (featuring Chuck D)	3:27
11.	"Catch Up to My Step" (featuring Solomon Burke)	4:13
12.	"Never Alone" (featuring Terry Hall)	3:41
13.	"Configuring Audio System"	0:24
14.	"A Little Less Conversation" (vs. Elvis Presley)	3:33
15.	"Beauty Never Fades" (featuring Saffron)	3:34
16.	"Broken" (featuring Grant Nicholas)	3:41
17.	"JXL Radio Technical Support"	1:17

==== Disc 2 – "3AM" ====
No.	Title	Length
1.	"Intro 3AM"	0:55
2.	"Chilled"	2:27
3.	"Dubzilla"	5:04
4.	"Casio"	5:20
5.	"Angels" (12" cut)	8:17
6.	"Breezer" (featuring Sasha)	7:26
7.	"Nudge"	7:05
8.	"Red"	11:00
9.	"Beauty Never Fades" (12" cut)	12:35
10.	"Cosmic Cure"	8:32
11.	"Rehsurc"	4:34

Note: These track lists and lengths refer to the US version. For the European/Japanese version, see Discogs.

=== Digital "7AM" albums ===
==== 7AM – Ambient ====
No.	Title	Length
1.	"Reload (7AM Remix)" (featuring Dave Gahan)	4:31
2.	"Talk Tonight"	3:29
3.	"Streets"	4:14
4.	"Twilight"	5:08
5.	"Rivers" (featuring Shelley Harland)	4:01
6.	"Tommy Dub"	2:52
7.	"Sphere"	2:53
8.	"All I Want"	4:49
9.	"Mogwai" (featuring Paul Malone)	8:39

==== 7AM – Dance ====
No.	Title	Length
1.	"Tennis"	5:00
2.	"Electro"	4:50
3.	"Angels (7AM Surreal)" (featuring Gary Numan)	6:47
4.	"Techno Ibiza"	8:52
5.	"Drubba Drub"	4:21
6.	"Destiny"	8:06
7.	"Egypt"	9:22
8.	"Heat"	8:14
9.	"Groovy"	7:32
10.	"See The Light?"	7:40

== Singles ==
- "Beauty Never Fades" (12")
- "Breezer" (12")
- "Catch Up to My Step" (CDS)
- "Don't Wake Up Policeman" (CDS)
- "Between These Walls" (CDS)
