= Mental Floss for the Globe =

Studio album by Urban Dance Squad
- Released: 1989
- Recorded: May–July 1989
- Studios: I.C.P. (Brussels, Belgium)
- Genre: Rap metal
- Length: 46:27
- Label: Ariola
- Producer: Jean-Marie Aerts

Urban Dance Squad chronology
Mental Floss for the Globe (1989)	Life 'n Perspectives of a Genuine Crossover (1991)

Singles from Mental Floss for the Globe
- 1. "Deeper Shade of Soul" Released: 1989; 2. "No Kid" Released: 1990; 3. "Fast Lane" Released: 1991

Mental Floss for the Globe is the debut studio album by the Dutch rap rock band Urban Dance Squad, released in 1989 by Ariola in Europe, and the following year by Arista Records in the United States. Produced by Belgian guitarist Jean-Marie Aerts, it spawned three singles: "Deeper Shade of Soul", "No Kid" and "Fast Lane".

== Release ==
The album was originally released as an independent limited pressing, licensed to Ariola in Holland and Europe, before being released by Arista Records in the United States. In 1999, the album was reissued with a bonus disc containing a live recording from 1990.

The initial release of the album included samples of Jimi Hendrix, the Rolling Stones and Captain Beefheart that were removed from subsequent reissues.

The album peaked at No. 54 on the Billboard 200 chart and number 153 on the Australian ARIA Chart.

"Deeper Shade of Soul" reached No. 21 on the Billboard Hot 100 chart. The album won an Edison Award in the Netherlands, and in 2008 was named the best Dutch pop album of all time by Dutch music magazine OOR.

== Critical reception ==
Professional ratings
Review scores
Source	Rating
AllMusic	4/5 stars
Chicago Tribune	3/4 stars
Entertainment Weekly	A−
Orlando Sentinel	5/5 stars

The album was released in the US to positive reviews; the Toledo Blade commented on the unusual combination of rock instrumentation with a rapper and a DJ, and of hip-hop rhythms with heavy metal music, and called it "refreshing".

According to AllMusic's Rick Anderson, the album "revealed a band smashing the boundaries between rock, funk, punk, metal, and hip-hop."

Simon Reynolds, writing for Entertainment Weekly, described the album as a collage of rap, rock, funk, dub, reggae, and soul.

Writing for the Chicago Tribune, Greg Kot commented on the album's sound: "Put the music of James Brown, Public Enemy, Robert Johnson, Sly Stone, Bad Brains, Lee Perry and Jimi Hendrix in a blender and this is what it might sound like." He also stated that the album's "primary virtue is that it creates a sonic world in which punk, funk, blues, metal, reggae and hip-hop collide with joyous abandon."

== Track listing ==
Ariola edition

Side A
No.	Title	Length
1.	"Fast Lane"	3:16
2.	"No Kid"	3:32
3.	"Deeper Shade of Soul"	4:28
4.	"Brainstorm on the U.D.S."	3:59
5.	"Big Apple"	3:26
6.	"Piece of Rock"	4:55
Total length:		23:36

Side B
No.	Title	Length
1.	"Prayer for My Demo"	3:32
2.	"The Devil"	3:32
3.	"Famous When You're Dead"	5:09
4.	"Mental Floss for the Globe"	3:04
5.	"Hitchhike H.D."	3:22
6.	"God Blasts the Queen"	4:12
Total length:		22:51

Compact disc editions from Arista Records added the B-sides "Man on the Corner" and "Struggle for Jive" to the track listing; "Hitchhike H.D." was removed from all Arista releases.

== Personnel ==
Credits are adapted from the liner notes of Mental Floss for the Globe.

Urban Dance Squad

- Magic Stick – drums, percussion, backing vocals
- DNA – turntables, special FX, backing vocals
- Rudeboy – leads, backing vocals
- Silly Sil – bass, standing bass, hollow bass, backing vocals
- Tres Manos – guitar, national steel, pedal steel, backing vocals

Additional musicians

- Luther Renaldo Francois – sax ("Deeper Shades of Soul")
- J.M.X. – guitar ("Piece of Rock", "Mental Floss")

Production

- J.M.A. – artistic producer, mixing
- Michel Dierickx – engineer
- Christian Ramon – engineer, mixing
- U.D.S. – mixing
