= Tom Holkenborg =

Dutch musician and composer (born 1967)

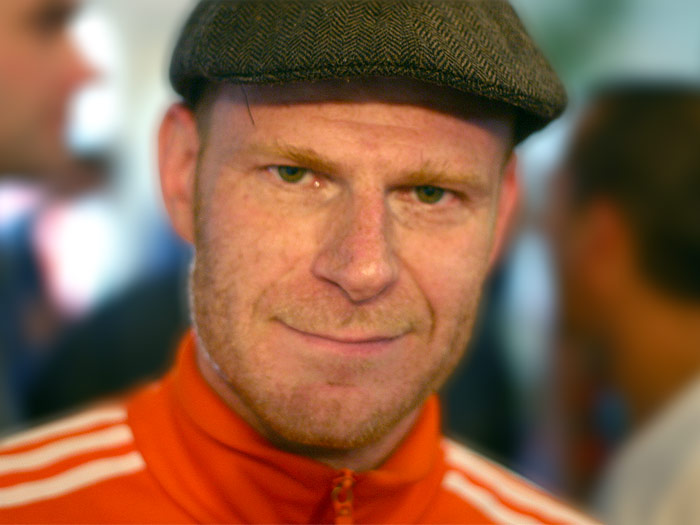
- Holkenborg at the Ultra Music Festival in 2007

Background information
- Also known as: Junkie XL; JXL
- Born: 8 December 1967 (age 58); Lichtenvoorde, Gelderland, Netherlands
- Genres: Big beat; electronic; trance; ambient; electronic rock; film score
- Occupations: Composer; multi-instrumentalist; DJ; producer; engineer
- Instruments: Keyboards; synthesizer; turntables; guitar; drums
- Years active: 1988–present
- Labels: Artwerk; Ultra; Roadrunner
- Website: tomholkenborg.com

Tom Holkenborg (born 8 December 1967), also known as Junkie XL, is a Dutch composer, multi-instrumentalist, DJ, producer, and engineer. Originally known for his trance productions, he has moved to producing electronica and big beat music and film scores. His remix of Elvis Presley's "A Little Less Conversation" became a worldwide hit in 2002.

In film scores, he has worked with Hans Zimmer and his company Remote Control Productions on Batman v Superman: Dawn of Justice, as well as composing the scores for Zack Snyder's Justice League, Divergent, Mad Max: Fury Road, Deadpool, Tomb Raider, Alita: Battle Angel, Terminator: Dark Fate, the Sonic the Hedgehog film series, Scoob!, Godzilla vs. Kong, Army of the Dead, Three Thousand Years of Longing, Rebel Moon, Godzilla x Kong: The New Empire, Rebel Moon – Part Two: The Scargiver, and Furiosa: A Mad Max Saga.

== Early life ==
Holkenborg was born in Lichtenvoorde, Gelderland, Netherlands. Classically trained by his mother – herself an accredited music teacher – Holkenborg started playing piano when he was three years old, drums when he was eight, and guitar at 12. Influenced by the psychedelic pop of Pink Floyd and King Crimson, he took up the bass by age 14. After moving to Leeuwarden, at the age of 17, he decided to take a job at a local music store selling keyboards and other digital gear, and began to have an appreciation for the combination of electronic and organic sounds. It was shortly after he discovered synthesizers that he joined the Dutch new wave ensemble Weekend at Waikiki as a multi-instrumentalist and producer, touring extensively with the band, including through Poland and parts of the Soviet Union, from 1988 to 1991. He also produced and played on their 1994 album, Sputnik. In 1993, Holkenborg produced Almost a Dance by Dutch metal band The Gathering, and later that year went on to form the industrial rock band Nerve with Phil Mills. After signing with label Play It Again Sam in 1992 and releasing two LPs – Cancer of Choice (1993) and Blood & Gold (1994) – he continued as a producer, working with hardcore punk and metal bands like Sepultura, Fear Factory, and Dog Eat Dog, while simultaneously licensing some of his instrumental electronic tracks for racing video games like The Need For Speed and Test Drive 5. It was during this time that he also began scoring the Dutch feature film Siberia, which would be released by Warner Bros. Netherlands.

== Career ==
=== 1997–99: Saturday Teenage Kick and Big Sounds of the Drags ===
In 1997, Holkenborg released Saturday Teenage Kick, his first album under the "Junkie XL" moniker. Featuring singles such as "Billy Club", "Def Beat", and "Dealing with the Roster", the album combined pounding breakbeat rhythms with elements of rock and psychedelia. Much of the album's songs featured lyrics and vocals by Patrick "Rude Boy" Tilon, vocalist for the Dutch rap rock band Urban Dance Squad. After a brief tour with The Prodigy and festival dates at Fuji Rock and Roskilde, Holkenborg made a name for himself in the upcoming U.S. rave scene. His second LP, Big Sounds of the Drags, was released in 1999, once again with Tilon providing vocal work to most of the album's songs, as in "Action Radius", "Power of Big Slacks", "Zerotonine", "Love Like Razorblade", "Legion", and "Next Plateau". "Future in Computer Hell (Part 2)", the last track on the album, was featured prominently on Welsh DJ and producer Sasha's mix album Global Underground 013: Ibiza.

=== 2002: "A Little Less Conversation" ===
While making inroads as a film composer – contributing to movies like Blade (1998) and The Beach (2000) – Holkenborg was asked to remix Elvis Presley's 1968 single "A Little Less Conversation" (with three different music videos) for a 2002 Nike World Cup commercial, titled "Secret Tournament". The occasion marked the first time Presley's estate had granted permission for any of Presley's material to be remixed. The song reached No. 1 in 24 countries, including the United Kingdom, Japan, Australia and Mexico, and was released as a single under the name "Elvis vs. JXL". The song was also featured as the title song to the NBC TV series Las Vegas, and in feature films like Shark Tale, Next, Percy Jackson & the Olympians: The Lightning Thief, Megamind, and Teenage Mutant Ninja Turtles: Out of the Shadows.

=== 2003: Radio JXL: A Broadcast from the Computer Hell Cabin ===
The success of "A Little Less Conversation" set the stage for his 2003 double-disc album, Radio JXL: A Broadcast from the Computer Hell Cabin. The name "Computer Hell" referred to Holkenborg's Amsterdam studio and headquarters. Loosely based around the concept of a fictitious pirate radio station, the album's 3PM side features collaborations with The Cure's Robert Smith, Depeche Mode's Dave Gahan, Peter Tosh, Chuck D from Public Enemy, Gary Numan, Solomon Burke, and Saffron, along with the said Elvis Presley remix. The 3AM side consists mostly of progressive house instrumentals, including "Breezer", a collaboration with Sasha. The album was to be launched simultaneously with a fully functioning internet radio station at www.RadioJXL.com, which was to feature exclusive shows and mixes with top EDM producers and DJs, but the undertaking proved to be too expensive and time-consuming to continue. Subsequently, two downloadable albums were released from the site: 7AM Ambient and 7AM Dance.

=== 2004–08: Today and Booming Back at You ===
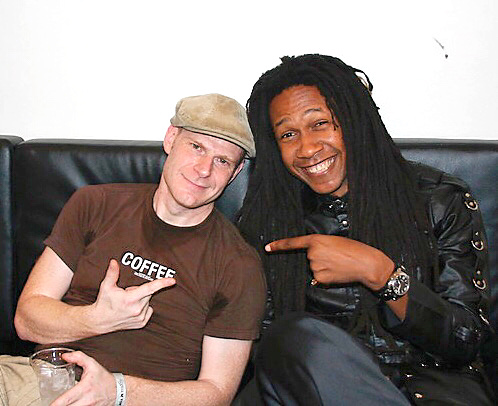
Junkie XL & Kēvens in 2006

Holkenborg decided to relocate to Los Angeles in 2003, and in April 2006, released his fourth full-length album, Today, an album that reflected the personal and professional changes that were occurring in his life. Today features only one guest vocalist, Nathan Mader, and reverts to the more guitar-based sound of his first two albums. His fifth album, Booming Back at You, saw Holkenborg cultivate a stronger club sound punctuated by tracks like "1967 Poem", featuring Steve Aoki. Many of the lyrics on the album were written in collaboration with Electrocute's Nicole Morier, who appears in "Mad Pursuit", "Not Enough", and "New Toy". The album was released on Artwerk Music, a joint venture between Nettwerk Music and video game company Electronic Arts, and peaked at 11 on Billboard's Top Electronic Album chart. It was the first Junkie XL full-length to chart in the U.S., and featured the hit single, "More", with Lauren Rocket. Rocket also contributed vocals to the Siouxsie and the Banshees' cover "Cities in Dust".

=== 2012: Synthesized ===
On 27 November 2012, Junkie XL released his sixth full-length album, entitled Synthesized. The album was preceded by a single EP for "Molly's E", which was released on 6 September and features remixes by Azari & III and Canblaster. A second single, "Gloria" (with Fredrik Saroea of Datarock), was released on 23 October. Stylistically, Synthesized strikes a balance between the introspective sound of Today and the club-heavy sound of Booming Back at You, and features collaborations with Isis Salam ("Off The Dancefloor"), Tears for Fears' Curt Smith ("When Enough is Not Enough"), and Tommie Sunshine ("Love Machine"). The album also features a spoken word excerpt from Timothy Leary's The Psychedelic Experience, read by Leary, on the song "Leave Behind Your Ego". A video for "Off the Dancefloor" was created by Japanese electro-pop band Trippple Nippples. The videos for "Gloria" and "Leave Behind Your Ego" were directed by John Christopher Pina for Clean Sweep.

=== Composing for film ===
In collaboration with Harry Gregson-Williams, he contributed additional music to the Tony Scott film Domino (2005), and served as the composer for the Dutch film Blind, which was nominated for Best Original Music Score at the Netherlands Film Festival in 2007 and received the Grand Prix award for Best Original Music Score at the 2008 Aubagne International Film Festival. Holkenborg continues to work in the film and television industry, collaborating with composer Hans Zimmer as a sequencer programmer on Christopher Nolan's The Dark Knight Rises. The film marks the fourth scoring collaboration between Holkenborg and Zimmer, including Megamind (2010), Inception (2010) and Madagascar 3: Europe's Most Wanted (2012). Since moving into Zimmer's Remote Control Productions studio, the two have worked together on many other musical projects, including a remix of that year's Academy Awards theme song. Holkenborg has provided music for the films Kingdom of Heaven, Domino, DOA: Dead or Alive, Shark Tale, The Chronicles of Riddick: Dark Fury, The Animatrix, and Resident Evil, and has had his original music featured in a number of major motion pictures, including Blade ("Dealing with the Roster") and The Beach ("Synaesthesia"). In 2013, he composed the music for the Relativity Media film Paranoia. Shortly after, he was brought in by Zack Snyder, the producer of 300: Rise of an Empire, to create the score for the film. He is credited as the composer for the 2014 film Divergent, with Hans Zimmer credited as "Executive Producer" for the soundtrack. He is a member of the Magnificent Six, a collaborative group of five other musicians, consisting of Hans Zimmer, Pharrell Williams, Johnny Marr (from The Smiths), Michael Einziger (from Incubus), Andrew Kawczynski, and Steve Mazzaro. The "supergroup" of artists ranging from diverse backgrounds teamed up to compose the score for The Amazing Spider-Man 2. He was the primary composer for the 2015 film Mad Max: Fury Road and the 2016 film Deadpool, and was co-composer for the film Batman v Superman: Dawn of Justice, along with Zimmer (who still wrote all the main themes, including the music for Wonder Woman which was later used in the film of the same name). Holkenborg was set to compose the music for the Snyder's 2017 film Justice League, but was replaced by Danny Elfman when director Joss Whedon was brought on to finish the film. Holkenborg composed the scores for the 2018 film Mortal Engines, the 2019 films Alita: Battle Angel and Terminator: Dark Fate, the 2020 films Sonic the Hedgehog and Scoob!, the 2021 releases Zack Snyder's Justice League, Godzilla vs. Kong, and Army of the Dead, and the 2022 releases The 355, Sonic the Hedgehog 2, and Three Thousand Years of Longing.

=== Composing for video games ===
To go along with his numerous artist albums and EPs, Holkenborg has been creating original music for video games since the mid-1990s. In addition to composing the soundtrack for Xbox racing games Forza Motorsport and Quantum Redshift, Holkenborg is responsible for the SSX Blur soundtrack. He has also licensed a number of his album tracks for video game use. "Future in Computer Hell (Part 2)", "Synasthesia", and "Dance USA"—all taken from his album Big Sounds of the Drags—were licensed to the racing video game TD Overdrive: The Brotherhood of Speed (2002). The title track for Today is featured on the soundtrack for the video games Burnout Legends and Burnout Revenge, while "More"—taken from his fifth album, Booming Back at You—is featured on the soundtrack to EA Games' Need for Speed: ProStreet, which also includes a full score from Holkenborg. His cover of Siouxsie and the Banshees' "Cities in Dust" is featured on Electronic Arts' Burnout Paradise. He has written additional music for and licensed music to The Matrix: Path of Neo, Destroy All Humans!, The Sims 2: Nightlife, The Sims 3, Need for Speed: High Stakes, Need for Speed: Underground, Need for Speed: Carbon, FIFA 08, and FIFA Street 3, among others. He composed the soundtrack for EA's Darkspore.

=== Remixes ===
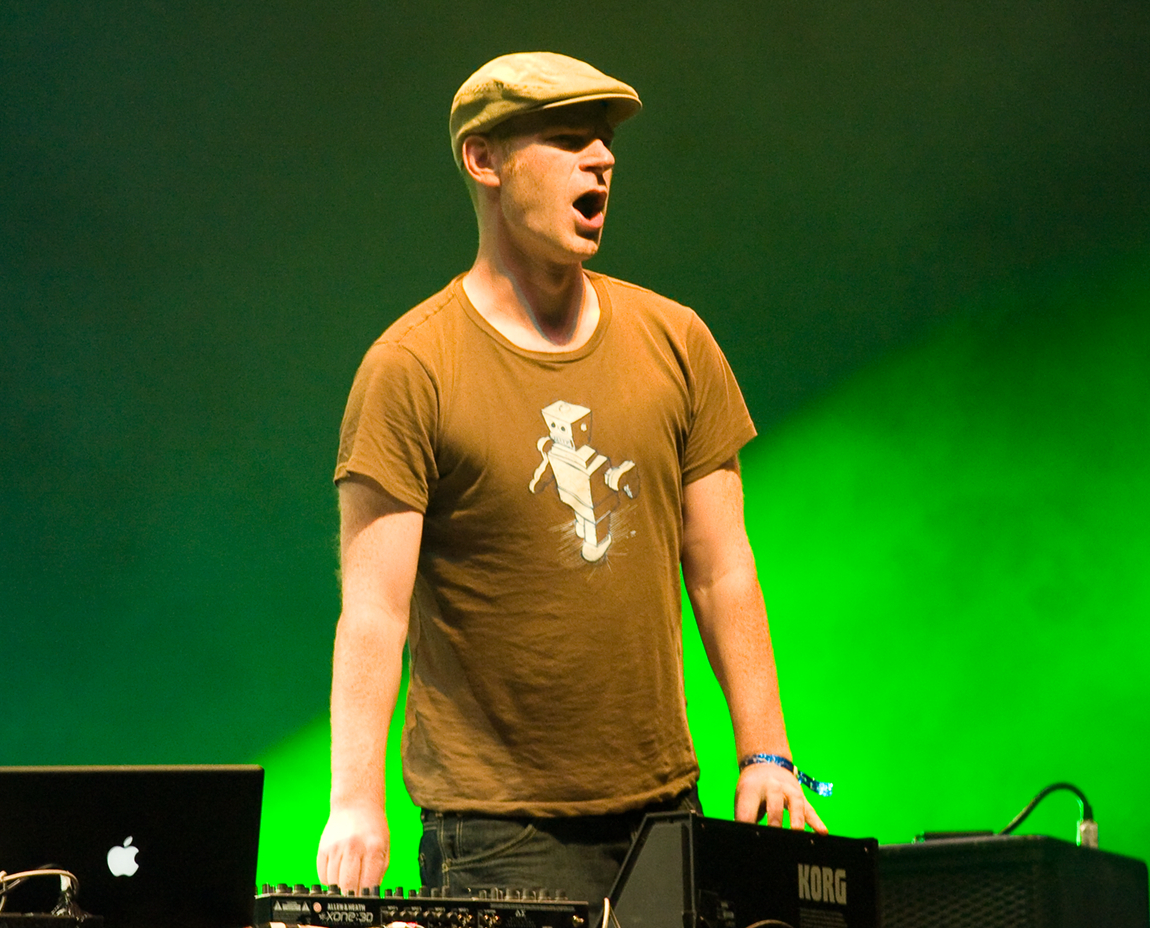
Junkie XL performing live in 2008

Holkenborg had made remixes—for both A-list pop superstars and lesser known artists. Highlights include work for Scissor Sisters ("Mary", "Land of a Thousand Words"), Depeche Mode ("Enjoy the Silence"), U.N.K.L.E. ("Burn My Shadow"), Justin Timberlake ("What Goes Around"), Fatboy Slim ("Weapon of Choice"), Coldplay ("Talk"), Bloc Party ("Sunday"), Michael Bublé ("Sway"), Avril Lavigne ("Girlfriend"), Daft Punk ("The Grid"), Madonna ("4 Minutes"), Fischerspooner ("Emerge"), and Hans Zimmer ("Inception" and "Bombers Over Ibiza"). His remix for Britney Spears' "Outrageous" was used in the 2004 film Catwoman, and his remix of "And Then We Kiss" was featured on Spears' 2005 remix album B in the Mix: The Remixes. In 2008, he was nominated for a Grammy Award for Best Remixed Recording, Non-Classical for his remix of Madonna's "4 Minutes". His remix of Elvis Presley's "A Little Less Conversation" has gone to No. 1 in 24 countries.

=== Commercial work ===
Holkenborg's music has also been featured in a number of international ad campaigns for major brands like Nike, Adidas, Heineken, and Cadillac. His remix of Eagles of Death Metal's "Don't Speak" was used in the 2008 Nike "Take it to the Next Level" commercial, which was directed by Guy Ritchie. "Today" was featured on ESPN commercials for Major League Soccer, while "A Little Less Conversation" provided the soundtrack to Nike's 2002 World Cup campaign.

In 2003, Holkenborg created the musical theme of Dutch television channel Nederland 3.

== Personal life ==
Holkenborg is an associate professor at the ArtEZ Conservatorium, one of the major art institutes in the Netherlands, where he teaches producing, remixing, and music composition. He resides in Tarzana, Los Angeles, California.

He uses the name JXL in cases where the term "Junkie" might cause offense. One example of this was with his biggest hit, a remix of the song "A Little Less Conversation" which was performed by Elvis Presley, a singer who toward the end of his life was addicted to prescription drugs and whose death in 1977 at the age of 42 was at least partially caused by them. Holkenborg says of his name: "I called myself Junkie XL from the point of view that once you're completely overworked, you never want to go there again. The 'XL' stands for expanding limits; broadening up your vision."

== Discography ==
=== Studio albums ===
- Saturday Teenage Kick (1997)
- Big Sounds of the Drags (1999)
- Radio JXL: A Broadcast from the Computer Hell Cabin (2003)
- Today (2006)
- Booming Back at You (2008)
- Synthesized (2012)

=== Film ===
Year	Title	Director(s)	Note(s)	Ref.
1998	Siberia	Robert Jan Westdijk		
2006	DOA: Dead or Alive	Corey Yuen		
2007	Blind	Tamar van den Dop		
2010	The Happy Housewife	Antoinette Beumer		
2010	Johan Primero	Johan Kramer		
2010	New Kids Turbo	Steffen Haars and Flip van der Kuil		
2011	Bringing Up Bobby	Famke Janssen		
2011	The Heineken Kidnapping	Maarten Treurniet		
2011	New Kids Nitro	Steffen Haars and Flip van der Kuil		
2013	Paranoia	Robert Luketic		
2014	300: Rise of an Empire	Noam Murro		
2014	Divergent	Neil Burger		
2014	The Amazing Spider-Man 2	Marc Webb	with/as a part of Hans Zimmer & The Magnificent Six	
2015	Run All Night	Jaume Collet-Serra		
2015	Mad Max: Fury Road	George Miller		
2015	Kill Your Friends	Owen Harris		
2015	Black Mass	Scott Cooper		
2015	Point Break	Ericson Core		
2016	Deadpool	Tim Miller		
2016	Batman v Superman: Dawn of Justice	Zack Snyder	with Hans Zimmer	
2016	Brimstone	Martin Koolhoven		
2016	Distance Between Dreams	Rob Bruce		
2016	Spectral	Nic Mathieu		
2017	The Dark Tower	Nikolaj Arcel		
2018	Tomb Raider	Roar Uthaug		
2018	Mortal Engines	Christian Rivers		
2019	Alita: Battle Angel	Robert Rodriguez		
2019	Terminator: Dark Fate	Tim Miller		
2020	Sonic the Hedgehog	Jeff Fowler		
2020	Scoob!	Tony Cervone		
2021	Zack Snyder's Justice League	Zack Snyder		
2021	Godzilla vs. Kong	Adam Wingard		
2021	Army of the Dead	Zack Snyder		
2022	The 355	Simon Kinberg		
2022	Sonic the Hedgehog 2	Jeff Fowler		
2022	Three Thousand Years of Longing	George Miller		
2023	Rebel Moon	Zack Snyder		
2024	Godzilla x Kong: The New Empire	Adam Wingard	with Antonio Di Iorio	
2024	Rebel Moon – Part Two: The Scargiver	Zack Snyder		
2024	Furiosa: A Mad Max Saga	George Miller		
2024	Sonic the Hedgehog 3	Jeff Fowler		

=== Video game scores ===
Year	Title	Developer(s)	Publisher(s)	Notes
2002	Quantum Redshift	Curly Monsters	Microsoft Game Studios	—N/a
2003	Need for Speed: Underground	EA Black Box	Electronic Arts	"Action Radius"
2003	SSX 3	EA Canada	EA Sports BIG	"Emerge" JunkieXL Remix
2005	Burnout Legends	Criterion	Electronic Arts	—N/a
2005	Forza Motorsport	Turn 10 Studios	Microsoft Game Studios	—N/a
2005	The Sims 2: Nightlife	Maxis	Electronic Arts	Neighborhood Theme remix
2005	The Matrix: Path of Neo	Shiny Entertainment	Atari	Composed with Tobias Enhus
2006	Need for Speed: Carbon	EA Black Box	Electronic Arts	Melody - Feel the Rush (Remix)Yonderboi - People Always Talk About The Weather (Remix)
2007	SSX Blur	EA Montreal	EA Sports BIG	—N/a
2007	Need for Speed: ProStreet	EA Black Box	Electronic Arts	Composed with Andre Ettema and Sam Estes
2008	Burnout Paradise	Criterion	Electronic Arts	—N/a
2010	The Sims 3 - Re-Imagined	Maxis	Electronic Arts	—N/a
2011	Darkspore	Maxis	Electronic Arts	—N/a
2015	Madden NFL 16	EA Tiburon	EA Sports	—N/a
2017	FIFA 18	EA Vancouver; EA Romania	EA Sports	—N/a
2024	Skull and Bones	Ubisoft Singapore	Ubisoft	—N/a

=== Television scores ===
Year	Title	Notes
2003	Nederland 3	Musical score for the channel
2012	Lijn 32	8 episodes
2019–present	Love, Death & Robots	3 episodes
2019	Chimerica	4 episodes Composed with Shigeru Umebayashi
2020	White Lines	10 episodes
