= Patrick Tilon =

Dutch vocalist

Patrick Tilon (born 1964), known professionally as Rudeboy Remington is a Dutch singer, rapper, and musician best known as the vocalist of the rap rock band Urban Dance Squad. He also provided vocals for the first two albums of Dutch electronic musician Junkie XL (1997–2000).

== Career ==
After Urban Dance Squad disbanded in 2000, he left Junkie XL and made a few records with short-lived bands and projects: The League of XO Gentlemen (Smiling at the Claptrap Circuses, 2003) and Club of High Eyebrows (Older Now, 2007). Tilon also worked in the catering industry during this period. Since 2011 he has been singing under a new moniker, The Arguido, with the Amsterdam surf band The Phantom Four, which released the album Sounds From the Obscure in 2012.

In 2019, Tilon joined noise rock band The Cold Vein from Nijmegen. In 2022, they published their first album Simple Trick More Voodoo. They split up in the summer of 2023.

Since 2022, Tilon and DJ DNA (Arjen de Vreede), original members of Urban Dance Squad, started touring again with new band members Axel van Oort (bass), Jochem van Rooijen (drums) and Matthias van Beek (guitar), playing the UDS-repertoire.
