= Urban Dance Squad =

Dutch rap rock band

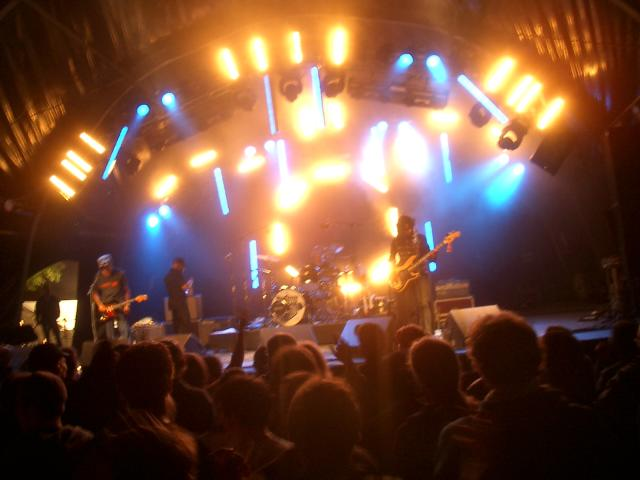
- Urban Dance Squad performing live in 2006.

Background information
- Origin: Utrecht, Netherlands
- Genre: Rap rock
- Years active: 1986–2000; 2006
- Labels: Ariola; Arista; Triple X; Virgin
- Members: Rudeboy Remington (Patrick Tilon); Tres Manos (René van Barneveld); Silly Sil (Silvano Matadin); Magic Stick (Michel Schoots); DJ DNA (DoNotAsk) (Arjen de Vreede)
- Website: www.uds.nl

Urban Dance Squad was a Dutch rap rock band formed after what was originally intended as a one-time jam-session at a festival in Utrecht on December 20, 1986. The band consisted of vocalist Rudeboy Remington (Patrick Tilon), guitarist Tres Manos (René van Barneveld), bassist Silly Sil (Silvano Matadin), drummer Magic Stick (Michel Schoots), and turntablist DJ DNA (Arjen de Vreede). Described as pioneers of rap/metal fusion, the band's debut album Mental Floss for the Globe (1989) won an Edison Award, and its single "Deeper Shade of Soul" reached number 21 on the Billboard Hot 100. Urban Dance Squad was one of the most successful Dutch bands of the nineties, releasing five studio albums before disbanding in 2000.

== Career ==
Urban Dance Squad first got together in 1986, at a jam session in De Vrije Vloer, a club in Utrecht, a jam which resulted in the first Dutch rock band with a rapper (they borrowed the name from Parliament-Funkadelic's Urban Dancefloor Guerillas); a song, "Struggle for Jive"; and the blending different forms of music in the Netherlands, at the same time that Fishbone, Living Colour, Red Hot Chili Peppers, Faith No More, and the Beastie Boys were doing the same in the United States. The band recorded its first album, Mental Floss for the Globe, in Brussels in 1989 (produced by Jean-Marie Aerts, of TC Matic), and came to instant success. It won an Edison Award, and the single "Deeper Shade of Soul" was a hit in Europe, and in the United States, where it charted at number 21 on the Billboard Hot 100. Two more singles were released from the album, and Urban Dance Squad toured the US in 1991, opening for Living Colour. The UDS had always been a volatile unit with the band members frequently arguing, and this came to a head while touring as the opening act for U2, after the release of Life 'n Perspectives of a Genuine Crossover, when DJ DNA quit abruptly.

In the middle of the band's career, to capitalize on the success of grunge and alternative rock, Urban Dance Squad released Persona Non Grata in January 1994. All of the tracks feature heavy use of distortion and guitar. The singles "No Honestly" and "Candy Strip Exp." were released, the latter single being released as a radio edit that cuts most of the pre-song noise.

Artantica saw release in 1999, and was a return to the band's hip-hop roots, and received critical acclaim. Urban Dance Squad disbanded the following year, though they did perform together again as late as 2006.

== Musical style and influence ==
The Pittsburgh Press described Urban Dance Squad's music as "refried Zeppelin riffs and neo-Hendrix guitar solos complete with sound effects and old soul records to produce an exceedingly loud, densely packed, dissonant garage-rock stew." In 2021, Metal Hammer named UDS as one of "10 funk metal bands that time forgot". AllMusic described UDS as a "sample-heavy, groove-happy rap-rock band"; biographer Heather Phares wrote, "Urban Dance Squad's mix of rock, rap, funk, ska, folk, hip-hop, and soul signaled the trend toward genre-bending that prevailed in '90s music." In the site's review of their album Artantica, writer Rick Anderson wrote, "For those who think of rap metal fusion as something invented by bands like Korn and Limp Bizkit, Urban Dance Squad is back to remind you that they've been doing it for ten years now".

== Band members ==
- Rudeboy Remington (Patrick Tilon) - vocals
- Tres Manos (René van Barneveld) - guitar
- Silly Sil (Silvano Matadin) - bass guitar
- Magic Stick (Michel Schoots) - drums
- DJ DNA (Arjen de Vreede) - turntables (1987-1993, 1997-2000, 2006)
- U-Gene - keyboards (1996-1997)

== Discography ==
=== Albums ===
- Mental Floss for the Globe (1989)
- Life 'n Perspectives of a Genuine Crossover (1991)
- Persona Non Grata (1994)
- Planet Ultra (1996)
- Beograd Live (1997)
- Artantica (1999)
- The Singles Collection (2006)

=== Extended plays ===
- Mental Relapse (1991) – US only

=== Singles ===
List of singles, with selected chart positions
Year	Single	Peak positions				Album
Year	Single	NED	AUS	BEL (FL)	US	Album
1989	"Deeper Shade of Soul"	52	56	—	21	Mental Floss for the Globe
1990	"No Kid"	52	—	—	—	Mental Floss for the Globe
1991	"Fast Lane"	59	146	—	—	Mental Floss for the Globe
1991	"Bureaucrat of Flaccostreet"	—	165	—	—	Life 'N Perspectives of a Genuine Crossover
1992	"Routine"	65	—	—	—	Life 'N Perspectives of a Genuine Crossover
1992	"Grand Black Citizen"	65	—	—	—	Life 'N Perspectives of a Genuine Crossover
1994	"Demagogue"	31	174	39	—	Persona Non Grata
1994	"Candy Strip Experience"	—	—	—	—	Persona Non Grata
1996	"Dresscode"	—	—	—	—	Planet Ultra
1996	"Temporarily Expendable"	61	—	15	—	Planet Ultra
1997	"Ego"	94	—	—	—	Planet Ultra
1997	"Carbon Copy"	—	—	—	—	Planet Ultra
1999	"Happy Go Fucked Up"	—	—	—	—	Artantica
"—" denotes releases that did not chart or were not released.

=== Music videos ===
Year	Album	Title	Director
1989	Mental Floss for the Globe	Fast Lane	n/c
1990	Mental Floss for the Globe	Deeper Shade of Soul	Kevin Kerslake
1990	Mental Floss for the Globe	No Kid	n/c
1991	Life 'n Perspectives of a Guenine Crossover	Bureaucrat of Flaccostreet	n/c
1994	Persona Non Grata	Candy Strip Experience	n/c
1995	Persona Non Grata	Demagogue	Carlos Grasso
1996	Planet Ultra	Temporarily Expendable	n/c
1999	Artantica	Happy Go Fucked Up	Rogier van de Ploeg

== Other media ==
=== Film ===
- "Fast Lane" appears in the 1990 film Pump Up the Volume but does not appear on the soundtrack album.
- The song "Good Grief" appears on the soundtrack of the 1995 film Hackers, and the band has a cameo appearance in the film with the same song.
- The song "Demagogue" appears on the soundtrack of the 2001 film Crazy/Beautiful and in 2003 on Gigli.

=== Documentary ===
- 5 jaar wanorde (5 years of disorder) is a two-part documentary about Urban Dance Squad by director Bram van Splunteren for VPRO's Onrust, originally broadcast in 1992.
