= Front Line Assembly discography =

- Studio albums: 17
- Extended plays: 1
- Soundtrack albums: 2
- Live albums: 3
- Compilation albums: 13
- Tribute albums: 5
- Singles: 32
- Music videos: 10
- Demos: 2
- Remix albums: 5

Front Line Assembly, a Canadian Vancouver-based electro-industrial band, has released seventeen studio albums, three live albums, numerous singles and compilations, and two video game soundtracks. With Bill Leeb being the founder and sole permanent member of the band, Michael Balch, Rhys Fulber and Chris Peterson were acting as long-time members during different periods of time.

== Demos ==
Year	Title	Notes
1986	Nerve War	Self-release. Limited to 100 copies. Three versions. Re-released as remastered version through Cleopatra in 2022.
1986	Total Terror	Self-release. Limited to 100 copies.

== Albums ==
=== Studio albums ===
Year	Album details	Notes
1987	The Initial Command: Released: December 1987; Label: KK, ROIR, Third Mind, Cleopatra, Zoth Ommog; Formats: LP, CD	Re-released 1992 and 1997. The 1997 re-release contains two additional new tracks and comes with a different cover artwork.
1988	State of Mind: Released: January 1988; Label: Dossier, ROIR, Third Mind, Cleopatra; Formats: LP, CS	Re-released in 1998 with bonus track. Remastered and re-released in 2022 as part of the compilation Permanent Data 1986-1989 with bonus tracks.
1988	Corrosion: Released: February 1988; Label: Third Mind, Wax Trax!; Formats: LP, CS	Re-released as part of Convergence in 1988 and Corroded Disorder in 1995. Remastered and re-released in 2022 as part of the compilation Permanent Data 1986-1989 and as individual LP.
1989	Gashed Senses & Crossfire: Released: April 1, 1989; Label: Third Mind, Wax Trax!, Roadrunner; Formats: LP, CD, CS	
1990	Caustic Grip: Released: 1990; Label: Third Mind, Wax Trax!, Roadrunner; Formats: CD, LP, CS	
1992	Tactical Neural Implant: Released: April 28, 1992; Label: Third Mind, Apollon International, Roadrunner; Formats: CD	Tactical Neural Implant sold more than 70,000 copies.
1994	Millennium: Released: October 1, 1994; Label: Roadrunner, Apollon International, Metal Mind; Formats: CD	
1995	Hard Wired: Released: November 14, 1995; Label: Off Beat, Metropolis, Energy, Black Rain; Formats: CD, LP	Also released in a limited edition Double CD box set. Hard Wired sold at least 50,000 copies worldwide. The limited edition with 5,000 copies was sold out in two weeks.
1997	[FLA]vour of the Weak: Released: November 3, 1997; Label: Off Beat, Energy, Metropolis, Synthetic Symphony; Formats: CD, LP (re-release 2015)	
1999	Implode: Released: April 26, 1999; Label: Metropolis, Zoth Ommog, Energy; Formats: CD, LP	
2001	Epitaph: Released: October 9, 2001; Label: Metropolis; Formats: CD, LP (re-release 2015)	
2004	Civilization: Released: January 20, 2004; Label: Metropolis, Synthetic Symphony; Formats: CD	On some retail CDs the back cover track listing failed to label some tracks correctly and omitted one track while the booklet left out one track.
2006	Artificial Soldier: Released: June 20, 2006; Label: Metropolis; Formats: CD, LP (re-release 2016)	Reached No. 19 on Billboard's Top Dance/Electronic Albums chart.
2010	Improvised Electronic Device: Released: June 22, 2010; Label: Metropolis, Dependent; Formats: CD, LP, digital download	Also released as a digital Deluxe Edition with two extra tracks. Reached No. 23 on Billboard's Top Dance/Electronic Albums chart.
2013	Echogenetic: Released: July 9, 2013; Label: Metropolis, Dependent; Formats: CD, LP, digital download	Reached No. 19 on Billboard's Top Dance/Electronic Albums chart and the Heatseekers Albums chart.
2019	Wake Up the Coma: Released: February 8, 2019; Label: Metropolis; Formats: CD, LP, digital download	Reached no. 40 on Billboard's Independent Albums chart and no. 15 on the Heatseekers Albums chart.
2021	Mechanical Soul: Released: January 15, 2021; Label: Metropolis; Formats: CD, LP, digital download	

=== Live albums ===
Year	Album details	Notes
1989	Live: Released: 1989; Label: Third Mind; Formats: LP	Released as a Limited LP. Only 4000 copies made. Remastered and re-released in 2022 as part of the compilation Permanent Data 1986-1989.
1996	Live Wired: Released: September 16, 1996; Label: Off Beat, Metropolis, Energy; Formats: CD	Double live album. Also released in a limited edition box set with VHS.
2015	Kampfbereit: Released: April 7, 2015; Label: MVD Visual; Formats: DVD	

=== Compilation albums ===
Year	Album details	Notes
1988	Convergence: Released: 1988; Label: Third Mind, Wax Trax!; Formats: CD, CS	Compilation of Corrosion and Disorder with some unreleased tracks.
1993	Total Terror I: Released: 1993; Label: Cleopatra, Dossier; Formats: CD	CD release of most tracks of the Total Terror demo and additional tracks from 1986. Re-released 2004 together with Total Terror II as double CD album. Remastered and re-released with bonus tracks in 2022 as part of the compilation Permanent Data 1986-1989 and as individual LP.
1993	Total Terror II: Released: 1993; Label: Cleopatra, Dossier; Formats: CD	CD release of demo songs from 1986 and 1987. Re-released 2004 together with Total Terror I as double CD album. Remastered and re-released in 2022 as part of the compilation Permanent Data 1986-1989 and as individual LP.
1995	Corroded Disorder: Released: November 21, 1995; Label: Cleopatra, Off Beat, Energy, Synthetic Symphony; Formats: CD	New material plus tracks from Corrosion and Disorder.
1997	Reclamation: Released: October 1, 1997; Label: Roadrunner, Metal Mind; Formats: CD	Singles compilation.
1998	The Singles: Four Fit: Released: 1998; Label: Zoth Ommog; Formats: CD	Compilation of previously released singles Virus, Iceolate, Provision and Mindphaser.
1998	Monument: Released: 1998; Label: Roadrunner, Metal Mind; Formats: CD	Singles compilation.
1998	Cryogenic Studios: Released: 1998; Label: Cleopatra, Zoth Ommog; Formats: CD	Compilation with tracks from Front Line Assembly and side projects Delerium, Equinox, Pro>Tech and Synæsthesia, partly previously unreleased.
1999	Explosion: Released: 1999; Label: Off Beat; Formats: CD	Singles compilation composed from tracks of the singles Circuitry, Plasticity, Colombian Necktie and Comatose.
2001	Cryogenic Studio, Vol. 2: Released: 2001; Label: Cleopatra; Formats: CD	Compilation with tracks from Front Line Assembly and side projects Delerium, Equinox, Pro>Tech and Synæsthesia, partly previously unreleased.
2004	Complete Total Terror: Released: 2004; Label: Cleopatra; Formats: CD	Two-disc compilation of Total Terror I and Total Terror II demo material.
2005	The Best of Cryogenic Studio: Released: 2005; Label: Cleopatra; Formats: CD	Two-disc compilation with previously released tracks from Cryogenic Studios and Cryogenic Studio, Vol. 2.
2022	Permanent Data 1986-1989: Released: August 19, 2022; Label: Cleopatra; Formats: CD, digital download	Six-disc compilation that consists of the releases Total Terror I, Total Terror II, State of Mind, Corrosion, Disorder and Live with bonus tracks.

=== Extended plays ===
Year	Album details	Notes
1988	Disorder: Released: May 1988; Label: Third Mind, Wax Trax!; Formats: Vinyl EP	Re-released as part of Convergence in 1988 and Corroded Disorder in 1995. Remastered and re-released with bonus tracks in 2022 as part of the compilation Permanent Data 1986-1989 and as individual LP.

=== Remix albums ===
Year	Album details	Notes
1996	The Remix Wars: Strike 2: Released: 1996; Label: Off Beat, Cleopatra; Formats: CD, LP (re-release 2016)	Remix collaboration with Die Krupps.
1998	Re-wind: Released: August 17, 1998; Label: Off Beat, Metropolis, Energy, Synthetic Symphony; Formats: CD, LP (re-release 2016)	Two-disc album with remixed tracks of [FLA]vour of the Weak.
2007	Fallout: Released: April 24, 2007; Label: Metropolis; Formats: CD, LP (re-release 2016)	Originally announced as an EP. Released as an album with three previously unreleased tracks and nine remixes.
2014	Echoes: Released: May 13, 2014; Label: Metropolis; Formats: CD, LP, digital download	
2022	The Machinists Reunited Tour EP: Released: August 9, 2022; Label: Self-release; Formats: CD	Limited autographed edition available only during "The Machinists Reunited Tour 2022" at the concert venues. The EP contains two tracks each by Front Line Assembly and Die Krupps, each of which are reinterpreted by the other artist.
2025	Mechviruses: Released: February 7, 2025; Label: Artoffact; Formats: CD, LP, digital download	Remixed tracks of WarMech from Artoffact artists.

=== Soundtracks ===
Year	Album details	Notes
2000	Quake III: Team Arena: Released: December 18, 2000	Expansion pack for Quake III Arena. Collaboration with Sonic Mayhem.
2012	AirMech: Released: November 13, 2012; Label: Metropolis, Dependent; Formats: CD, digital download, LP (re-release 2014)	
2018	WarMech: Released: June 18, 2018; Label: Artoffact; Formats: CD, LP, digital download	

=== Tribute albums ===
==== From Front Line Assembly ====
Year	Album details	Song	Notes
1999	Virgin Voices: A Tribute to Madonna, Vol. 1: Released: March 23, 1999; Label: Cleopatra	Justify My Love	
1999	We Will Follow: A Tribute to U2: Released: July 13, 1999; Label: Cleopatra	New Year's Day	Front Line Assembly with Tiffany.
2023	A Tribute To Rammstein: Released: August 25, 2023; Label: Cleopatra	Deutschland	

==== To Front Line Assembly ====
Year	Album details	Notes
2003	Replicate 01: A Tribute to Front Line Assembly: Released: August 18, 2003; Label: MoMT; Formats: CD, digital download	First release on label MoMT Records.
2010	Replicate 02: A Tribute to Front Line Assembly & Projects: Label: MoMT; Formats: Digital download	Last release on label MoMT Records.

== Singles ==
Title	Year	Album	Label	Notes
Digital Tension Dementia	1988	Gashed Senses & Crossfire	Third Mind, Wax Trax!	Reached No. 45 on Billboard's Hot Dance Club Songs
No Limit	1989	Gashed Senses & Crossfire	Third Mind, Wax Trax!	
Iceolate	1990	Caustic Grip	Third Mind, Wax Trax!	Melody Maker 'Single Of The Week'
Provision	1990	Caustic Grip	Third Mind, Wax Trax!	Melody Maker 'Single Of The Week'
Virus	1991		Third Mind, Wax Trax!	Non-album single from the Caustic Grip sessions.
Mindphaser	1992	Tactical Neural Implant	Third Mind	
The Blade	1992	Tactical Neural Implant	Third Mind	
Millennium	1994	Millennium	Roadrunner	
Surface Patterns	1995	Millennium	Roadrunner	
Circuitry	1995	Hard Wired	Off Beat, Metropolis	
Plasticity	1996		Off Beat, Metropolis	Non-album single from the Hard Wired sessions.
Colombian Necktie	1997	[FLA]vour of the Weak	Off Beat, Metropolis, Energy	
Comatose	1998	[FLA]vour of the Weak	Off Beat, Metropolis	
Prophecy	1999	Implode	Metropolis, Zoth Ommog, Energy	
Fatalist	1999	Implode	Metropolis, Zoth Ommog, Energy	
Everything Must Perish	2001	Epitaph	Metropolis	
Maniacal	2003	Civilization	Metropolis	Reached No. 15 on Billboard's Hot Dance Singles
Vanished	2004	Civilization	Metropolis	
Shifting Through the Lens	2010	Improvised Electronic Device	Dependent, Metropolis	
Angriff [Remix]	2010	Improvised Electronic Device	Dependent, Metropolis	
Eye on You	2018	Wake Up the Coma	Metropolis	
Purge (Black Asteroid Remix)	2022	Mechanical Soul	Metropolis	
Deutschland	2023	A Tribute To Rammstein	Cleopatra	Cover of German Neue Deutsche Härte band Rammstein.
Mechvirus featuring Ayria (Remix)	2023	WarMech	Artoffact	
Mechvirus featuring Ultra Sunn (Remix)	2023	WarMech	Artoffact	
Force Carrier featuring Bootblacks (Remix)	2024	WarMech	Artoffact	
Molotov featuring Seeming (Remix)	2024	WarMech	Artoffact	
Anthropod featuring Deep Infirmary (Remix)	2024	WarMech	Artoffact	
Heatmap featuring MVTANT (Remix)	2024	WarMech	Artoffact	
(Re)Creator featuring Fotocrime (Remix)	2024	WarMech	Artoffact	
Molotov featuring Encephalon (Remix)	2024	WarMech	Artoffact	
Molotov featuring s:cage + Famine + Lys Morke (Remix)	2025	WarMech	Artoffact	

== Music videos ==
Title	Year	Album	Label	Director(s)	Producer(s)	Notes
Body Count	1988	Disorder	Third Mind	Todd Taylor	Third Mind Records	
Iceolate	1990	Caustic Grip	Third Mind	Eric Koziol	H-Gun Labs, Chicago	
Virus	1991	-	Third Mind	Jim Van Bebber, Bill Leeb	Plasma, Gary Blair Smith	Non-album track from the Caustic Grip sessions.
Mindphaser	1992	Tactical Neural Implant	Third Mind	Robert Lee	Plasma, Gary Blair Smith	Edits Front Line Assembly into clips from 1989 Japanese live-action mecha film Gunhed. Won "Best Alternative Video" at Much Music's 1992 Canadian Music Video Awards.
The Blade	1992	Tactical Neural Implant	Third Mind	Bill Morrison	Dean English	
Laughing Pain	1992	-	Third Mind	Rod Chong, Bill Morrison		Non-album track from The Blade single.
Millennium	1994	Millennium	Roadrunner	Eric Zimmerman, Lon Magdich	Marc Sayous	Filmed in Seattle and Chicago.
Plasticity	1996	-	Metropolis	Rod Chong	Real Life Pictures, Ulf Buddensieck	Non-album track from the Hard Wired sessions. Won Best Alternative Video at the 7th annual MuchMusic Video Awards in 1996.
Epitaph	2001	Epitaph	Metropolis	Bill Morrison		
Angriff	2010	Improvised Electronic Device	Dependent	Henrik Bauer	Bill Leeb, Chris Peterson, Jeremy Inkel, Jared Slingerland	
Blood	2014	Echogenetic	Metropolis	Rim Visuals		
Ghosts	2014	Echogenetic	Metropolis	Rim Visuals		
Rock Me Amadeus	2019	Wake Up the Coma	Metropolis	Jason Alacrity, Jason Jensen	Jason Alacrity, Colin Pierce	Featuring Jimmy Urine.
Arbeit	2020	Wake Up the Coma	Metropolis	Henrik Bjerregaard Clausen		Starring Kim Sønderholm.

== Compilation appearances ==
Title	Label	Release date	Format	Tracks included
Doctor Death's Vol. III	C'est La Mort	1989	LP, CS	"Concussion"
Black Box – Wax Trax! Records: The First 13 Years	Wax Trax!	1994	CD	"Digital Tension Dementia"
Tyranny Off the Beat Vol. IV	Off Beat	1997	CD	"Electrocution (Rough Mix)"
Electropolis Volume II	Metropolis	2000	CD	"Masterslave (Wumpscut RMX)"
Subout	Basic Unit Productions	2000	CD	"Epitaph"
