= Reclamation (Front Line Assembly album) =

Compilation album by Front Line Assembly
- Released: October 1, 1997
- Recorded: Vancouver Studios, Creation Studios, Little Mountain Sound, The Armoury Studio, Vancouver, B.C.
- Genre: Industrial, electro-industrial, industrial metal
- Length: 74:14
- Label: Roadrunner, Metal Mind
- Producer: Bill Leeb, Rhys Fulber, Michael Balch, Greg Reely

Front Line Assembly chronology
Live Wired (1996)	Reclamation (1997)	[FLA]vour of the Weak (1997)

Professional ratings
Review scores
Source	Rating
AllMusic	4.5/5 stars
All Music Guide to Electronica	4/5 stars
Culture Shock	6/7
Industrial Nation	Favorable
In Music We Trust	A
Kerrang!	4/5 stars
Q	3/5 stars
Sea of Tranquility	3/5 stars

Reclamation is a compilation album by Vancouver industrial band Front Line Assembly, released in 1997. It was re-released on July 30, 2007 through Polish label Metal Mind.

The booklet contains on two pages an outline of the band's history. It was written in July 1997 by Gary Levermore, founder of the record label Third Mind that issued many of Front Line Assembly's releases in the 1980s and the 1990s.

Some of the tracks, despite not being marked as remixes, have minor arrangement changes and/or longer running times. For example, "Provision" features an instrumental version of the chorus before the first verse which is not heard on the original from the album Caustic Grip.

== Track listing ==
All tracks are written by Bill Leeb and Rhys Fulber, except where noted.

No.	Title	Length
1.	"Digital Tension Dementia (Contagion Mix)" (Written by Bill Leeb and Michael Balch)	6:35
2.	"No Limit (Disintegration Mix)" (Written by Bill Leeb and Michael Balch)	6:39
3.	"Iceolate"	6:28
4.	"Virus (Hybrid Mix)"	5:53
5.	"Provision"	6:29
6.	"The Blade (Pro-Gress Mix)"	6:22
7.	"Heatwave"	5:22
8.	"Target"	4:48
9.	"Toxic"	6:02
10.	"Mindphaser"	6:42
11.	"Millennium (Ashes to Ashes Mix)"	6:37
12.	"Surface Patterns (Mission Control Mix)"	6:17

== Personnel ==
=== Front Line Assembly ===
- Bill Leeb – production, vocals
- Rhys Fulber – production (3–12), remixing (6)
- Michael Balch – production (1, 2), engineering (1, 2), mixing (1, 2)

=== Additional musicians ===
- Jeff Stoddard – guitar (5)

=== Technical personnel ===
- Greg Reely – additional production (6, 10), editing (1, 2, 4, 11, 12), engineering (3–12), mixing (3–5, 7–12)
- Anthony Valcic – engineering (1), mixing (1)
- Mark Stagg – remixing (6)
- Tom Baker – mastering (3)
- Dave McKean – artwork
