= Corroded Disorder =

Compilation album by Front Line Assembly
- Released: November 21, 1995
- Recorded: 1995
- Genres: Industrial, electro-industrial
- Length: 78:30
- Labels: Cleopatra, Off Beat, Energy, Synthetic Symphony

Front Line Assembly chronology
Hard Wired (1995)	Corroded Disorder (1995)	The Remix Wars: Strike 2 (1996)

Corroded Disorder is a compilation album by electro-industrial band Front Line Assembly. It combines two of the band's 1980s albums, along with including a few non-album tracks as well.

== Content ==
Corroded Disorder combines the Front Line Assembly albums Corrosion and Disorder (albeit with two tracks from Corrosion, "Conflict" and "The Wrack Part III – Wisdom", excluded). Both albums had a limited distribution when they were originally released in the 1980s. In addition, three tracks that appeared on the Convergence compilation (which similarly combined Corrosion and Disorder) are included on Corroded Disorder (the last three songs): "Solitude of Confinement", "Collision", and "Headcase Fargone".

Two additional tracks on Corroded Disorder also did not appear on any other album (the first two songs): "Mutate" and "Teardown". "Mutate" is an alternate version of "Mutilate", which appeared on the 1992 single "Mindphaser". Unlike the other songs on the compilation, "Mutate" was not recorded during the 1988–1989 era. "Teardown" originally appeared on the 1988 Third Mind Records compilation Une Saison En Enfer (World Domination).

== Release ==
Corroded Disorder was originally released by Cleopatra Records and Off Beat in 1995. Polish label Mecanica issued a vinyl edition of the compilation in the summer of 2002.

Professional ratings
Review scores
Source	Rating
Industrial Nation	Favorable

== Track listing ==
No.	Title	Length
1.	"Mutate"	5:42
2.	"Teardown"	4:36
3.	"Lurid Sensation"	4:05
4.	"Right Hand of Heaven"	5:46
5.	"Concussion"	4:14
6.	"On the Cross"	5:49
7.	"Controversy"	5:20
8.	"Dark Dreams"	6:05
9.	"Body Count"	4:15
10.	"Obsession"	4:07
11.	"Aggression"	4:55
12.	"Die-Sect"	4:38
13.	"The Wrack"	3:26
14.	"Solitude of Confinement"	6:37
15.	"Collision"	4:28
16.	"Headcase Fargone"	4:27

== Personnel ==
=== Front Line Assembly ===
- Bill Leeb – vocals, electronic instruments
- Rhys Fulber – electronic instruments (1, 5, 11, 14–16)
- Michael Balch – electronic instruments (2–4, 6–10, 12, 13), engineering (2, 5, 6, 8, 14–16)

=== Technical personnel ===
- Greg Reely – engineering (1)
- Dave Ogilvie – engineering (3, 4, 7, 9–13)
- Delwyn Brooks – assistant engineering (1)
- Dave McKean – design, illustration, photography
