= The Remix Wars: Strike 2 =

Remix album by Front Line Assembly and Die Krupps
- Released: 1996
- Recorded: 1996
- Genre: Industrial, electro-industrial, industrial metal
- Length: 29:13
- Label: Off Beat, Cleopatra

Front Line Assembly chronology
Corroded Disorder (1995)	The Remix Wars: Strike 2 (1996)	Live Wired (1996)

Die Krupps chronology
III - Odyssey of the Mind (1995)	The Remix Wars: Strike 2 (1996)	Paradise Now (1997)

The Remix Wars chronology
The Remix Wars: Strike 1 - :Wumpscut: Vs. Haujobb (1996)	Front Line Assembly vs. Die Krupps - The Remix Wars Strike 2 (1996)	The Remix Wars: Strike 3 – 16 Volt vs. Hate Dept (1998)

Professional ratings
Review scores
Source	Rating
AllMusic	2.5/5 stars
All Music Guide to Electronica	3/5 stars
Industrial Nation	Favorable
Metal Hammer	3.5/5 stars

The Remix Wars: Strike 2 is remix album of Canadian industrial band Front Line Assembly and German industrial band Die Krupps, released in 1996. It is subtitled "Front Line Assembly vs. Die Krupps". It is the second in a series of four remix albums on which two bands remix each other's tracks. The liner notes of the album describes the concept: "Two different groups or projects fight each other using samplers, mixing consoles and creativity as their weapons." The first three tracks are from III - Odyssey of the Mind, the other tracks are from Hard Wired. On the occasion of the 20th anniversary of the launch of the remix series in 2016 Canadian label Artoffact re-released the albums on vinyl.

== Track listing ==
All lyrics are written by Ralf Dörper, except where noted; all music is composed by Jürgen Engler and Lee Altus

Die Krupps (Remixed by Front Line Assembly)
No.	Title	Length
1.	"Metalmorphosis (Shifting Mutation Mix)"	4:19
2.	"The Last Flood (Blood Stream Mix)"	5:36
3.	"Scent (Pheromone Mix)" (Lyrics by Engler)	4:52

All tracks are written by Bill Leeb and Rhys Fulber

Front Line Assembly (Remixed by Die Krupps)
No.	Title	Length
4.	"Neologic Spasm (Dislocated Mix)"	3:54
5.	"Barcode (Re-Assembled Mix)"	4:13
6.	"Transparent Species (Clustered Mix)"	6:19

== Personnel ==
- Bill Leeb – keyboards (4–6), remixing (1–3)
- Rhys Fulber – programming, keyboards (4–6), remixing (1–3)
- Greg Reely – engineering, mixing (4–6)
- Jürgen Engler – guitar (4–6), keyboard (4–6), remixing (4–6)
- Chris Lietz – drum programming (4–6), engineering (4–6), remixing (4–6)
