= Live Wired =

Live album by Front Line Assembly
- Released: September 16, 1996
- Recorded: October 24, 1995
- Venue: Kulturzentrum Mainz
- Genre: Industrial metal, electro-industrial, EBM
- Length: 111:24
- Label: Off Beat, Metropolis, Energy
- Producer: Bill Leeb, Rhys Fulber

Front Line Assembly chronology
The Remix Wars: Strike 2 (1996)	Live Wired (1996)	Reclamation (1997)

Professional ratings
Review scores
Source	Rating
AllMusic	3/5 stars
Culture Shock	Favorable
Industrial Nation	Mixed
Metal Hammer	3.5/5 stars
Vertigo	Favorable

Live Wired is a live album by Vancouver industrial band Front Line Assembly, released in 1996, with the majority of tracks coming from the bands previous two studio albums; Millennium and Hard Wired. A box set including the two CDs plus a VHS with all of the band's video clips to date (except "Mindphaser" and "Body Count"), and a live concert video (from the show in Chemnitz 1995, different from the one on CD) was released at the same time.

== Track listing ==
Disc 1
No.	Title	Also on	Length
1.	"Mortal"	Hard Wired	7:03
2.	"Vigilante"	Millennium	5:52
3.	"Circuitry"	Hard Wired	7:50
4.	"Bio-Mechanic"	Tactical Neural Implant	5:24
5.	"Resist"	Caustic Grip	5:24
6.	"Surface Patterns"	Millennium	6:15
7.	"Plasticity"		6:47
8.	"Modus Operandi"	Hard Wired	5:48
9.	"Liquid Separation"	Millennium	5:30
Total length:			55:55

Disc 2
No.	Title	Also on	Length
1.	"Gun"	Tactical Neural Implant	6:26
2.	"Overkill"	Caustic Grip	5:21
3.	"Millennium"	Millennium	11:46
4.	"Condemned"	Hard Wired	6:26
5.	"Mindphaser"	Tactical Neural Implant	9:46
6.	"Neologic Spasm"	Hard Wired	6:37
7.	"Body Count"	Disorder	9:09
Total length:			55:33

Live Wired Box Set VHS Video
No.	Title	Length
1.	"Intro Visual Mind"	0:25
2.	"Mortal"	2:52
3.	"Vigilante"	6:15
4.	"Circuitry"	7:21
5.	"Bio-Mechanic"	5:24
6.	"Iceolate" (Video Clip)	5:14
7.	"Resist"	5:21
8.	"Interview (Part1)"	2:59
9.	"Surface Patterns"	6:10
10.	"Millennium" (Video Clip)	4:27
11.	"Gun"	6:06
12.	"Interview (Part2)"	3:17
13.	"Modus Operandi"	5:28
14.	"Virus" (Video Clip)	4:26
15.	"Liquid Separation"	4:50
16.	"The Blade" (Video Clip)	4:25
17.	"Overkill"	5:24
18.	"Interview (Part3)"	2:34
19.	"Millennium"	7:47
20.	"Laughing Pain" (Video Clip)	5:21
21.	"Mindphaser"	6:39
22.	"Body Count"	7:54
23.	"Plasticity" (Video Clip)	4:17
Total length:		114:56

== Personnel ==
=== Front Line Assembly ===
- Bill Leeb – vocals, keyboard, percussion, production
- Rhys Fulber – keyboard, percussion, production

=== Additional live musicians ===
- Adrian White – drums, percussion
- Jed Simon – guitar, drums

=== Production and other personnel ===
- Greg Reely – sound engineering, recording, mixing
- Tim Oberthier – monitor engineering
- Elk H. – tour management
- Thorsten S. – press
- Torsten J. – backliner
- Nicole S. – merchandising
- Jos – video
- Ed – light
- (Flash) Gordon – driver
- Sven Schirm – photography
- Torsten Balzer – photography
- Thorsten Stroht – photography
- Katalyn Illes – photography
- Rod Chong – video interview directing
- Dave McKean – design, illustration
- Jürgen Heidelbach – booklet layout
- Christian Poeck – live video directing
- Steven Enderlein – live video editing
- Manfred Gremmer – live video editing
- Olaf Ave – live video camera
- Steven Enderlein – live video camera
- Christian Poeck – live video camera
- Lars Schreiber – live video camera
- Christine Ziesmer – live video camera
- Christian Poeck – live video executive production
- Gösta Oelstrom – live video executive production, live video production
- Uwe Praetel – live video production
