= Live (Front Line Assembly album) =

Live album by Front Line Assembly
- Released: August 1989
- Recorded: July 1989
- Genre: Industrial
- Length: 43:16
- Label: Third Mind

Front Line Assembly chronology
Gashed Senses & Crossfire (1989)	Live (1989)	Caustic Grip (1990)

Live is a live album by Canadian industrial band Front Line Assembly, released in 1989. The album contains recordings from the Gashed Senses & Crossfire tour in Europe. It was released only on vinyl and limited to 4.000 numbered copies.

The album was recorded during Front Line Assembly's first show in London in July 1989 which was probably not well attended. Thus "the recorded sound of the crowd cheering had to be edited and recycled from track to track just to give the sonic illusion of a packed room."

Live is known for its bad sound quality about which the band later expressed their discontent. Rhys Fulber did not even consider it a proper Front Line Assembly release. "The first one really doesn't count", he said in an interview in 1996 with Sonic Boom Magazine, comparing Live to the then upcoming live album of the Hard Wired tour.

== Track listing ==
Side One
No.	Title	Length
1.	"Intro (Turmoil)"	5:08
2.	"Digital Tension Dementia"	5:42
3.	"Sedation"	4:00
4.	"Lethal Compound"	7:48

Side Two
No.	Title	Length
1.	"Bloodsport"	6:01
2.	"Body Count"	4:40
3.	"Lurid Sensation"	6:15
4.	"Foolsgame"	3:42

== Personnel ==
- Bill Leeb
- Rhys Fulber
- Michael Balch
