= Re-Wind =

Remix album by Front Line Assembly
- Released: August 17, 1998
- Recorded: 1998
- Genre: Electro-industrial, psytrance, EBM
- Length: 1:43:56
- Label: Off Beat, Metropolis, Energy, Synthetic Symphony
- Producer: Bill Leeb, Chris Peterson

Front Line Assembly chronology
Cryogenic Studios (1998)	Re-Wind (1998)	Monument (1998)

Professional ratings
Review scores
Source	Rating
AllMusic	3/5 stars
Ink 19	Favorable

Re-Wind is a remix double album by Vancouver industrial band Front Line Assembly, released in 1998. All tracks were originally recorded for the band's previous studio album [FLA]vour of the Weak (some as b-sides). The band's longtime mixer, Greg Reely, had been absent on the original album and was brought back in on Re-Wind; therefore, disc one sees the band remixing itself with Reely's help. Disc two presents remixes by other artists.

== Release ==
The track "Predator (Final Mix by Collide)" is featured on the soundtrack album from the 2006 thriller The Covenant. According to Collide, the original name of the remix is "Radioactive Mix". On account of oversight at the label the name "Final Mix" appeared on the CD.

In 2016, Canadian label Artoffact reissued the album on vinyl.

== Track listing ==
All tracks are written by Bill Leeb and Chris Peterson

Disc 1
No.	Title	Length
1.	"Predator (Cease & Destroy-Mix)"	8:12
2.	"Aftermath (We All Shall Perish-Mix)"	7:27
3.	"Electrocution (Shocker Mix)"	8:40
4.	"Life (Suck It Up-Mix)"	8:10
5.	"Oblivion (Was It Worth It-Mix)"	7:14
6.	"Colombian Necktie (Loose Lips)"	7:34
7.	"Comatose (Re-Entry-Mix)"	6:49
Total length:		54:06

Disc 2
No.	Title	Length
1.	"Comatose (Grisha Mix by Front 242)"	5:51
2.	"Predator (Final Mix by Collide)"	6:33
3.	"Evil Playground (Chainsaw Mix by Tim Schuldt)"	8:02
4.	"Life=Leben (Anderes Leben by Kalte Farben)"	5:54
5.	"Comatose (V2.0 by Eat Static)"	8:05
6.	"Colombian Necktie (Grit Your Teeth Mix by Cydonia)"	8:04
7.	"Auto-Erotic (Abstinence Mix by Fini Tribe)"	7:21
Total length:		49:50

== Personnel ==
=== Front Line Assembly ===
- Bill Leeb – mixing (Disc 1)
- Chris Peterson – mixing (Disc 1)
- Karin – additional vocals (Disc 2: 2)

=== Technical personnel ===
- Greg Reely – mixing (Disc 1)
- Joe Varkey – assistant mixing (Disc 1)
- Brian Gardner – mastering (Disc 1)
- Meran – design, illustration, photography
- Fini Tribe – additional production (Disc 2: 7)
