= Millennium (Front Line Assembly album) =

Studio album by Front Line Assembly
- Released: October 11, 1994
- Recorded: January–February 1994, The Armoury Studios, Vancouver, Canada
- Genre: Industrial metal
- Length: 62:53; 48:33 (2007 re-issue disc 2)
- Label: Roadrunner, Apollon International, Metal Mind
- Producer: Bill Leeb, Rhys Fulber

Front Line Assembly chronology
Tactical Neural Implant (1992)	Millennium (1994)	Hard Wired (1995)

Singles from Millennium
- 1. "Millennium" Released: August 23, 1994; 2. "Surface Patterns" Released: November 1994

Professional ratings
Review scores
Source	Rating
AllMusic	3/5 stars
All Music Guide to Electronica	3/5 stars
Industrial Nation	Favorable
Infectious Substance	Unfavorable
Melody Maker	Unfavorable
Select	3/5 medals

Millennium is the seventh full-length studio album by industrial band Front Line Assembly, released in 1994 by Roadrunner Records on both compact disc and LP formats. The album marks the first major use of metal guitars, shifting in musical direction from their typical electro-industrial sound. The riffs were obtained from samples and the musicianship of the then unknown Devin Townsend of Strapping Young Lad, who would also contribute and perform on the next album.

== Background ==
Following Tactical Neural Implant, Front Line Assembly's record label Third Mind was acquired by Roadrunner Records. At the time, according to Rhys Fulber, the band was working on a more melodic, synth-pop-orientated follow-up. "We wrote a whole album", explained singer Bill Leeb, "and then we scrapped it. We finished twelve songs which took about eight months, then sat back for three weeks, listened to them, and thought we don't like this." The direction changed when Roadrunner sent the band a box of promotional CDs from metal bands, and Leeb suggested sampling some riffs off those CDs for a more harsher sound; "This Faith" and "Search and Destroy" were songs that were carried over from those sessions, with the latter having some guitars added to gel better with the rest of the record. The band cited American industrial metal group Fear Factory, for which the duo had created remixes for their Fear Is the Mindkiller EP, as a strong influence on Millennium: "Fear Factory had a huge effect on it.", said Fulber, "I was into the band and we got to do the remixes and I thought it was really cool. That had a lot to do with Millennium because we thought what we had done with [the remixes] was create this futuristic sounding cyber-metal."

== Musical style ==
Shifting from the electronic music dominated style of Front Line Assembly's former works, Millennium emphasizes heavy metal guitars. "[W]e just wanted to like do a different kind of record and just basically broadened our sound and our appeal", Bill Leeb said in an interview with Chaos Control about the change in sound, adding, "we also wanted to challenge the fans that we have, the listeners, because I’ve always been a die-hard purist in electronic music. I mean, if I could change I thought anybody else could, too." Some of the guitar sounds are used as looped samples, some are played live in the studio. A further addition to Front Line Assembly's sound on Millennium is rap on "Victim of a Criminal". The only typical electro-industrial track on the album is "This Faith", which is devoid of metal guitars.

=== Instrumental samples ===
Millennium created samples from several metal songs:

- "Millennium", "Division of Mind" : "A New Level" (Pantera - Vulgar Display of Power)
- "Surface Patterns" : "Walk" (Pantera - Vulgar Display of Power), "Don't Tread on Me" (Metallica - Metallica)
- "Victim of a Criminal" : "Dead Embryonic Cells" (Sepultura - Arise).

There are also samples from songs of other bands:

- "Vigilante" : "Esperanto" (Elektric Music - Esperanto)
- "Millennium" : "Get Right With Me" (Depeche Mode - Songs of Faith and Devotion)
- "Search and Destroy" : "Nasa Arab" (Coil Vs. The Eskaton - Nasa Arab), "Religion (Pussy Whipped Mix)" (Front 242 - 06:21:03:11 Up Evil)
- "Sex Offender" : "Shout (US Remix)" (Tears for Fears - Songs from the Big Chair)

== Release ==
The album was re-released on July 30, 2007, by Polish record label Metal Mind Productions as a limited two disc remastered edition. The second disc of which contains all of the remixes and B-sides from the "Millennium" and "Surface Patterns" singles. The re-release was issued on golden discs and was limited to 2000 copies and numbered.

The track "Surface Patterns" is featured on the soundtrack album of 1995 American horror film Hideaway.

In October 2019, Canadian label Artoffact started a crowdfunding campaign in order to obtain the album licenses and to re-release the album on vinyl on May 4, 2020.

=== Singles ===
The release of the "Millennium" single preceded the release of the album. The single contains three remixes of the title song. Non-album track "Transtime" uses a sample from the song "Home Computer" which was released by German electronic music band Kraftwerk on their 1981 album Computer World. "Transtime" is also featured on the compilation album Monument. The video clip that was shot for the track "Millennium" was filmed in Seattle and Chicago.

The second single, "Surface Patterns", features three remixes of the title track and non-album track "Internal Combustion". The cardboard case is mislabeled "Suface Patterns" on the spine.

=== Lyrics ===
"Millennium" is the first album of the band that includes the lyrics. Singer Bill Leeb admitted to being shy about printing the lyrics originally: "They're kind of personal, and I always felt like I never wanted to see my lyrics in print because I thought maybe out of context they'd just not have the same impact." Having had the vocals "put back in the mix" in past releases, Leeb said, "this time I felt pretty confident about them as far as being really representative of what my head space was at, of where we were at with the band, of our approach and outlook."

== Track listing ==
All tracks are written by Bill Leeb and Rhys Fulber, except where noted.

No.	Title	Writer(s)	Length
1.	"Vigilante"		6:28
2.	"Millennium"		6:10
3.	"Liquid Separation"		5:05
4.	"Search and Destroy"		6:30
5.	"Surface Patterns"		5:36
6.	"Victim of a Criminal" (feat. Che the Minister of Defense)	Leeb, Fulber, David Hansen	6:32
7.	"Division of Mind"		5:47
8.	"This Faith"		6:12
9.	"Plasma Springs"		6:20
10.	"Sex Offender"		8:13

2007 re-issue disc two
No.	Title	Length
1.	"Surface Patterns (Surveillance Remix)"	5:53
2.	"Surface Patterns (Chemical Cauldron Remix)"	7:38
3.	"Internal Combustion"	5:37
4.	"Surface Patterns (Scarification Remix)"	4:35
5.	"Millennium (1000 Years of Decay Remix)"	6:19
6.	"Millennium (Left in Ruins Remix)"	7:50
7.	"Transtime"	5:58
8.	"Millennium (Until Death Remix)"	4:43
Total length:		48:33

== Personnel ==
=== Front Line Assembly ===
- Bill Leeb – keyboards, vocals
- Rhys Fulber – keyboards, programming

=== Additional musicians ===
- Devin Townsend – guitar (1, 7, 10)
- Don Harrison – guitar (4, 9)
- Che the Minister of Defense – vocals (6)

=== Technical personnel ===
- Greg Reely – engineering, mixing
- Delwyn Brooks – assistant engineering
- Brian Gardner – mastering
- Dave McKean – design, illustration, photography

== Chart positions and awards ==
=== Chart positions ===
Chart (1994)	Peak position
Swedish Albums (Sverigetopplistan)	31

=== Awards ===
Millennium was nominated for the Juno Awards of 1995 in the category Best Hard Rock Album.
