= Intermix (band) =

- Origin: Vancouver, British Columbia, Canada
- Genres: Techno, ambient
- Years active: 1992–1995
- Labels: Third Mind, ESP-SUN
- Past members: Bill Leeb; Rhys Fulber

Intermix was a side project of Canadian industrial musicians Bill Leeb and Rhys Fulber in the 1990s that initially focused on techno, but included a more ambient style on their last album.

== Background ==
Industrial musician Chris Peterson, longstanding member of Front Line Assembly and related side projects, is credited with mixing duties on the first two albums.

== Discography ==
=== Albums ===
Year	Album	Label	Notes
1992	Intermix	Third Mind	Development versions of Microsoft's Windows Millennium Edition and Windows XP used the song "Voices" as a placeholder Sample Music.
1992	Phaze Two	Third Mind	The track "Monument" use samples of "Song of Sophia" from Dead Can Dance's 1988 album The Serpent's Egg.
1995	Future Primitives	ESP-SUN	

=== Singles ===
Year	Title	Album	Label	Notes
1992	Intermix/In The Nursery	Intermix	Third Mind	Split 12" with English neo-classical martial industrial electronica band and Third Mind label colleagues In the Nursery titled "2 Sides of Third Mind Records", Intermix songs on A-side, promo single.
1992	Dream On	Phaze Two	Third Mind	Only officially released single.
1993	Monument	Phaze Two	Third Mind	Promo single. The Monument remix was remastered and released on CD as part of the Front Line Assembly remix compilation Monument.
1995	Telekinetik Warriors	Future Primitives	ESP-SUN	Promo single.

=== Music videos ===
Title	Year	Album	Label	Director(s)	Producer(s)	Notes
"The Process"	1992	Phaze Two	Third Mind	Rod Chong	Ulf Buddensieck, Shane Lunny (co-production)	Not the whole track, but an audio collage with snippets.
"Monument"	1993	Phaze Two	Third Mind	Rod Chong	Anna Brunoro, Shane Lunny (co-production)	Video Edit of "Monument (Lost Classic Remix)".
