= Monument (Front Line Assembly album) =

Compilation album by Front Line Assembly
- Released: September 22, 1998
- Recorded: Vancouver Studios, Creation Studios, The Armoury Studios, The Warehouse Studio, Vancouver, B.C.
- Genre: Electro-industrial
- Length: 72:44
- Label: Roadrunner, Metal Mind
- Producer: Bill Leeb, Rhys Fulber, Michael Balch

Front Line Assembly chronology
| Re-Wind (1998) | Monument (1998) | Implode (1999) |

Professional ratings
Review scores
| Source | Rating |
|---|---|
| AllMusic | 3/5 stars |
| Consumable | Favorable |
| In Music We Trust | A |
| Q | 2/5 stars |
| Sea of Tranquility | 3/5 stars |

Monument is a compilation album by Canadian industrial band Front Line Assembly, released in 1998. It was re-released on July 30, 2007, by the Polish label Metal Mind. The track "Monument" appeared in its original version on the 1993 album Phaze Two of the side project Intermix. The booklet of the 2007 re-release contains a summary of the band's history.

== Track listing ==
All tracks are written by Bill Leeb and Rhys Fulber, except where noted.

| No. | Title | Length |
|---|---|---|
| 1. | "Big Money (Remix)" (Written by Bill Leeb and Michael Balch) | 4:20 |
| 2. | "Vexation (Provo Mix)" (Written by Bill Leeb and Michael Balch) | 6:35 |
| 3. | "Mental Distortion" | 6:50 |
| 4. | "Overkill (Surge Mix)" | 6:33 |
| 5. | "Virus (Cauterized Mix)" | 4:50 |
| 6. | "Resist (Dislocated Mix)" | 5:28 |
| 7. | "Mutilate" | 5:42 |
| 8. | "Transtime" | 6:17 |
| 9. | "Re-Animate" | 5:44 |
| 10. | "Laughing Pain" | 5:44 |
| 11. | "The Blade (Worldwide Mix)" | 6:25 |
| 12. | "Monument (Lost Classic Mix)" (Feat. Intermix) | 8:16 |

== Personnel ==
=== Front Line Assembly ===
- Bill Leeb – engineering (1), mixing (1)
- Rhys Fulber – production, programming
- Michael Balch – engineering (2), mixing (2)

=== Additional musicians ===
- Jeff Stoddard – guitar (5)

=== Technical personnel ===
- Greg Reely – editing (2, 4, 12), engineering (3–12), mixing (3–10, 12), mastering
- Anthony Valcic – engineering (1), mixing (1)
- Paul Kendall – remixing (11)
- Anne Marie Damjanovic – project coordination
- Dave McKean – design, photography, illustration
- Max McMullin – 3D programming
