= Hard Wired =

Album by Front Line Assembly

Studio album by Front Line Assembly
- Released: September 25, 1995
- Recorded: 1995, Warehouse
- Genres: Electro-industrial, electronic body music, industrial metal
- Length: 62:00
- Labels: Off Beat, Metropolis, Energy, Black Rain
- Producers: Bill Leeb, Rhys Fulber

Front Line Assembly chronology
Millennium (1994)	Hard Wired (1995)	Corroded Disorder (1995)

Singles from Hard Wired
- 1. "Circuitry" Released: October 31, 1995

Professional ratings
Review scores
Source	Rating
Alternative Press	4/5 stars
Industrial Nation	Favorable
Interface	Favorable
Melody Maker	Favorable
Music Week	3/5 stars
Sputnikmusic	3.5/5 stars
Vertigo	Favorable

Hard Wired is the eighth full-length studio album by Canadian electro-industrial band Front Line Assembly, released in 1995.

== Production and themes ==
The album was produced during the course of roughly five months. Singer Bill Leeb wrote the lyrics after the music was completed. The usual procedure for the band, as Leeb explained: "We write [...] the music and then once we've got it finished, then I sit at home and start on the lyrics. I can't imagine writing any other way. [...] I think with our music it's usually the sounds that inspire us." Lyrics-wise, the album addresses topics such as materialism and environmental issues, with an emphasis on the influence of technology: "I think most of the lyrics are basically about man versus technology. Basically, we’re destroying our planet with technology. At the same time, technology is the only thing that can save us. It's this constant struggle between these two forces that is making us go in whatever direction we're all going." This album also features Devin Townsend, of Strapping Young Lad, who contributes guitars.

=== Samples ===
Hard Wired makes extensive use of audio clips from a number of films:

- True Romance
- In the Mouth of Madness
- Lifeforce
- Stargate
- Speed
- The Puppet Masters
- No Escape
- Romeo Is Bleeding
- The Crow
- Lethal Weapon
- Alien 3

Some tracks use samples from Richard D. James songs, namely "Isopropanol" and "Dodeccaheedron" from his 1994 album Classics as well as "Isopropophlex" from his 1991 EP Analogue Bubblebath Vol I. Also sound effects of the video game Doom can be heard on Hard Wired.

== Track listing ==
All tracks are written by Bill Leeb and Rhys Fulber.

No.	Title	Length
1.	"Neologic Spasm"	5:51
2.	"Paralyzed"	5:30
3.	"Re-Birth"	5:19
4.	"Circuitry"	5:55
5.	"Mortal" (Instrumental)	5:42
6.	"Modus Operandi"	5:47
7.	"Transparent Species"	7:15
8.	"Barcode"	6:11
9.	"Condemned"	5:51
10.	"Infra Red Combat"	8:49

== Personnel ==
=== Front Line Assembly ===
- Bill Leeb – production, keyboards, vocals
- Rhys Fulber – production, programming, keyboards

=== Additional musicians ===
- Devin Townsend – electric guitar

=== Technical personnel ===
- Greg Reely – engineering, mixing
- Delwyn Brooks – assistant engineering
- Dave McKean – design, illustration, photography

== Release ==
Hard Wired was the band's first release for Off Beat. It has sold at least 50,000 copies worldwide. The limited edition with 5,000 copies was sold out in two weeks.

Coinciding with Front Line Assembly's tour through Europe in support of Improvised Electronic Device, Hard Wired was re-released in August 2011 by German label Black Rain Records as limited edition picture vinyl with a circulation of 500. It contains only seven songs and lacks the tracks "Mortal", "Modus Operandi" and "Transparent Species".

On the occasion of the 20th anniversary of Hard Wired in 2015, Canadian label Artoffact released a limited box set vinyl edition of the album with a circulation of 300 that included the Live Wired live album and the Circuitry single, all of which were remastered by Greg Reely.

=== Singles ===
Circuitry is the only single taken from Hard Wired. The limited edition came as a two CD Digipak packaging with different artwork that didn't include the second CD. This CD, titled Circuitry Disc 2, was part of the limited edition box of Hard Wired and packed in a slipcase. The first disc is a Mixed Mode CD and contains interactive content. It includes the official video for the track "Millennium" from the 1994 album of the same name and photo galleries. The data track is listed as first track titled "CD-ROM File" on the back cover. The track is only playable on computers running Windows and requires at least Windows 3.1. Disc 1 includes three remixes of "Circuitry" two of which are from Biosphere and Haujobb. The song "Epidemic" is a non-album track. The second disc includes another remix of "Circuitry" as well as non-album tracks "Destructive Transformation" and "Hydrogen". The idea to involve other artists in remixing originated from the label Off Beat.

Although the following single Plasticity did not appear on Hard Wired, it evolved from the album's production process. "It is part of the same sessions", said Rhys Fulber in an interview with Sonic Boom Magazine. According to Fulber this was intentional and was already done with the Virus single: "We kept it off the album to release later [...] It gives people a reason to check it out because if you release it as a single that is already on album no one is really going to care." Along with the original version and a Haujobb remix the single features non-album track "Replicant". A video clip was shot in Vancouver for the track "Plasticity" which also received airplay on Much Music. Vocalist Bill Leeb described the video as "very techno-orientated and hard-driving" with "a lot of computer images" and being "virtual reality-related". The video won the award for Best Alternative Video at the 7th annual MuchMusic Video Awards in Toronto in 1996.

The track "Plasticity" is featured in the article series 101 Greatest Industrial Songs of All Time in COMA Music Magazine, where it holds rank 70.

Most tracks of the singles were re-released in 1999 through Off Beat on the compilation album Explosion, together with tracks from the "Colombian Necktie" and "Comatose" singles. The timing of its release to coincide with the release of Implode was met with Bill Leeb's disapproval. Plasticity was re-released in 2012 by German record label Infacted Recordings, limited to 1,000 copies. The rereleased version contains the "Fatalist" single and the "Prophecy" single as additional tracks. A remastered vinyl version of the single was issued in July 2015 by Artoffact. Among the tracks already found on the original single it features another hitherto unpublished remix by Haujobb called "Plasticity (Dope Experience)".

== Chart positions ==
=== Album ===
Chart (1995)	Peak position
Swedish Albums (Sverigetopplistan)	47

=== Singles ===
==== Circuitry ====
Chart (1995)	Peak position
Sweden (Sverigetopplistan)	32
