= The Initial Command =

Studio album by Front Line Assembly
- Released: December 1987
- Recorded: August 1987
- Genre: Industrial, EBM, electro-industrial
- Length: 48:40 (original release); 62:46 (1997 release)
- Label: KK, ROIR, Third Mind, Cleopatra, Zoth Ommog
- Producer: Bill Leeb, Michael Balch

Front Line Assembly chronology
Total Terror (1986)	The Initial Command (1987)	State of Mind (1987)

Alternative cover
- Re-release (1997)

Professional ratings
Review scores
Source	Rating
Rear Garde	Favorable

The Initial Command is the first full-length studio album released by Canadian industrial band Front Line Assembly, released in 1987 through Belgian label KK.

== Release ==
Since the 1987 release of The Initial Command, the album has been re-issued several times. American label ROIR released the album in 1990 on cassette with a different cover. It was the first release of the album in the United States and the second Front Line Assembly album released by ROIR after the band's second album State of Mind. British label Third Mind followed in 1992 with a licensed CD version in the United States. Los Angeles–based Cleopatra's and German Zoth Ommog's release in 1997 contained two new tracks and new cover art. This re-release incorrectly listed the second track "Core" as "Intelligence Dream" while the liner notes have the correct title. "Complexity" and "Core" appear to be new songs at the time of release. Polish label Mecanica issued a vinyl edition of the 1997 release in summer 2002, while Cleopatra re-issued a remastered version of the album on September 3, 2022 on vinyl and with the two bonus tracks on CD.

== Production ==
The music was recorded on a 4-track tape.

== Track listing ==
All tracks are written by Bill Leeb, except where noted

1987 Release
No.	Title	Writer(s)	Length
1.	"The State"	Bill Leeb, Rhys Fulber	6:16
2.	"Insanity Lurks Nearby"		6:10
3.	"Casualties"	Bill Leeb, Rhys Fulber	4:46
4.	"Ausgang Zum Himmel"	Bill Leeb, Rhys Fulber	7:14
5.	"Nine Times"		6:27
6.	"Black March"		5:59
7.	"No Control"		6:37
8.	"Slaughterhouse"		5:11

1997 Re-release
No.	Title	Writer(s)	Length
1.	"Complexity"		7:48
2.	"Core"		6:12
3.	"The State"	Bill Leeb, Rhys Fulber	6:17
4.	"Insanity Lurks Nearby"		6:03
5.	"Casualties"	Bill Leeb, Rhys Fulber	4:46
6.	"Ausgang Zum Himmel"	Bill Leeb, Rhys Fulber	7:16
7.	"Nine Times"		6:30
8.	"Black March"		6:02
9.	"No Control"		6:40
10.	"Slaughterhouse"		5:12
Total length:			62:46

== Personnel ==
=== Front Line Assembly ===
- Bill Leeb – production, engineering, vocals
- Michael Balch – production (1987 Release), mixing (1987 Release)
- Rhys Fulber (1987 Release 1, 3, 4)
- Chris Peterson – mixing (1997 Re-release 1, 2)

=== Technical personnel ===
- Carylann Loeppky – cover art (1987 Release)
- David Rosychuk – design (1987 Release), artwork (1987 Release)
