= Epitaph (Front Line Assembly album) =

Studio album by Front Line Assembly
- Released: October 8, 2001
- Recorded: 2001, Cryogenic Studio
- Genre: Electro-industrial, EBM
- Length: 54:57
- Label: Metropolis
- Producer: Bill Leeb, Chris Peterson

Front Line Assembly chronology
Cryogenic Studio, Vol. 2 (2000)	Epitaph (2001)	Civilization (2004)

Singles from Epitaph
- 1. "Everything Must Perish" Released: September 11, 2001

Epitaph is the eleventh full-length studio album by Vancouver industrial band Front Line Assembly, released in 2001.

== Writing and composition ==
Being a characteristic feature on previous recordings, on Epitaph Front Line Assembly did not use samples. "This is the first time we quit using movie samples.", said Bill Leeb to Belgian magazine Side-Line and cited the more important role of samples in contemporary music and its financial side: "Sampling is an artform which was criticised in the beginning, but now it's a respected artform with big money in it. It's a big business where I don't feel at ease any longer."

== Track listing ==
All tracks are written by Bill Leeb and Chris Peterson, except where noted.

No.	Title	Length
1.	"Haloed"	4:45
2.	"Dead Planet"	5:20
3.	"Backlash"	5:37
4.	"Epitaph"	4:19
5.	"Everything Must Perish"	6:19
6.	"Conscience"	5:12
7.	"Decoy"	6:17
8.	"Insolence"	5:46
9.	"Krank It Up"	5:43
10.	"Existance" (The song "Existance" ends at 8:15. After one minute of silence (8:15 - 9:15), the hidden song "Submerged" [written and composed by Peterson, Jason Filipchuk] begins.)	18:20

== Personnel ==
=== Front Line Assembly ===
- Bill Leeb – production, vocals
- Chris Peterson – production

=== Technical personnel ===
- Greg Reely – mixing, engineering
- Brian Gardner – mastering
- Dave McKean – artwork, design

== Release ==
Professional ratings
Aggregate scores
Source	Rating
Metacritic	82/100
Review scores
Source	Rating
AllMusic	4/5 stars
Barcode	7.2/10
Industrial Nation	Mixed
Metal Hammer	7/10
Outburn	4/5 stars
Rock Sound	3.5/5 stars
Side-Line	9/10
SLUG	5+
Splendid	Favorable

With the release, Metropolis also issued a Digipak version that contains a hidden bonus track and was limited to 25.000 copies. Even though the bonus track was originally announced as untitled, its title was later revealed as "Submerged". It was later available in remixed form on the Noise Unit 2005 album Voyeur.

The track "Existence" is featured in the 2002 horror film Resident Evil but not on the accompanying soundtrack.

In 2015, Canadian label Artoffact re-released Epitaph on limited edition vinyl.

=== Single ===
"Everything Must Perish" is the only single taken from Epitaph. Along with the original version the title track is featured as radio edit. Non-album track "Providence" is sung by Jenifer McLaren, also guest vocalist on Delerium's Poem. Johan Carlsson from Release Magazine wrote that the band has taken "a more mature and melodic route" with the single. Noting the Delerium influence on "Providence", he described the song as "beefed up, speeded up and dancified Delerium track".
