= Heavenly Bodies (band) =

English new wave/ethereal wave band

- Origin: England
- Genres: New wave; ethereal wave
- Years active: 1986-1988
- Labels: Third Mind Records; C'est La Mort
- Past members: Caroline Seaman; James Pinker; Scott Rodger; Tony Waerea

Heavenly Bodies was a new wave/ethereal wave band from England, formed in 1986.

== History ==
The band comprised lead vocalist Caroline Seaman and didgeridoo player and saxophonist Tony Waerea of This Mortal Coil, and former Dead Can Dance members drummer James Pinker and bassist Scott Rodger.

In 1987, they released their first song on the Perdurabo compilation (Cathexis Recordings) and recorded their studio album Celestial, which was released in 1988, followed by an EP called Rains on Me in the same year. Rains on Me was remixed by Robin Guthrie of the Cocteau Twins.

== Discography ==
=== Studio albums ===
- Celestial (1988)

=== EPs ===
- Rains on Me (1988)
