= Millennium Four: The Right =

Cancelled video game

- Developer: 5D Games
- Publisher: GT Interactive
- Platforms: Windows; Macintosh
- Release: Cancelled

Millennium Four: The Right is a cancelled video game from GT Interactive. The game was described as a first-person perspective, 3D space combat/action/strategy game.

== Gameplay ==
Millennium Four: The Right is a first-person, 3D space combat and strategy game with 60 star systems to explore. The game uses advanced AI-driven economics, where trade prices shift based on political and economic conditions. It includes full multiplayer support (up to 32 players) with a unique "serverless" design, allowing games to continue even if the original host leaves, and features three multiplayer modes: Single System MultiSlayer, Multiple System MultiSlayer, and Full Game Universe. Its graphics support resolutions up to 1280x1024 with 24-bit color and true 3D sound. Players engage in space battles, navigate faction conflicts, and influence the story through their choices.

== Plot ==
Millennium Four: The Right is set in the thirty-sixth century. Earth is dying, and humanity has colonized many star systems, but expansion halts with the return of the Aahnja—a faction of humans abducted 15,000 years ago and trained as warriors by an alien race called the Aahnk. Players begin as neutral traders caught in escalating tensions between the Centauri Cooperative and the Aahnja-backed rebels, Brooks-Taylor FreeSpace. They can choose to support either side or remain neutral, with the game's AI dynamically shaping the world around them.

== Development ==
The game was in development by 5D Games, a privately held company founded in July 1996 by former developers of Papyrus Design Group. It was originally code named G-Zero and was scheduled to be released in Christmas 1997. The game's music was to be composed by Front Line Assembly.

In January 1997, 5D Games Announced that G-Zero would be renamed to Millennium Four: The Right. The same year GT Interactive obtained interactive media, merchandising, and publishing rights to the game as well as the rights to three future titles from 5D Games. By March 1997, the game was 55% complete. The game was later supposed to be released in fall 1998, but ultimately was not.
