= State of Mind (Front Line Assembly album) =

Studio album by Front Line Assembly
- Released: Early 1988
- Recorded: August 1987
- Genre: Electro-industrial, industrial dance
- Length: 58:18
- Label: Dossier, ROIR, Third Mind, Cleopatra
- Producer: Michael Balch

Front Line Assembly chronology
The Initial Command (1987)	State of Mind (1988)	Corrosion (1988)

Alternative cover
- Re-release (1996)

Professional ratings
Review scores
Source	Rating
AllMusic	2.5/5 stars
All Music Guide to Electronica	3/5 stars
Cash Box	Favorable
Factsheet Five	Favorable
Select	3/5 medals

State of Mind is the second full-length studio album by Canadian electro-industrial artists Front Line Assembly. It was released in 1988 by Dossier. State of Mind was later released on Cleopatra Records with alternate artwork and a bonus track, "Inside Out".

Band leader Bill Leeb said about choosing the label Dossier: "We just did it because I liked a lot of the other artists on the label."

== Release ==
Cleopatra re-issued State of Mind on vinyl on April 29, 2016. This edition has the original track listing.

== Track listing ==
All tracks are written by Bill Leeb.

1987 Vinyl Release
No.	Title	Length
1.	"First Reprisal"	5:21
2.	"Consequence"	5:37
3.	"Terminal Power"	2:42
4.	"Testimony"	5:27
5.	"Landslide"	4:46
6.	"Burnt Soul"	5:52
7.	"Malignant Fracture"	4:15
8.	"Eastern Voices"	5:27

1988 CD Release
No.	Title	Length
1.	"First Reprisal"	5:21
2.	"Consequence"	5:36
3.	"Burnt Soul"	2:42
4.	"Testimony"	5:26
5.	"Landslide"	4:45
6.	"Terminal Power"	5:49
7.	"Malignant Fracture"	4:16
8.	"Eastern Voices"	5:27
9.	"Resistance"	4:31
10.	"Sustain Upright"	4:07
11.	"No Tomorrow"	5:06
12.	"And They Shall Bow"	4:45

1996 Re-release
No.	Title	Length
1.	"Inside Out"	4:16
2.	"First Reprisal"	5:21
3.	"Consequence"	5:36
4.	"Burnt Soul"	2:42
5.	"Testimony"	5:26
6.	"Landslide"	4:45
7.	"Terminal Power"	5:49
8.	"Malignant Fracture"	4:16
9.	"Eastern Voices"	5:27
10.	"Resistance"	4:31
11.	"Sustain Upright"	4:07
12.	"No Tomorrow"	5:06
13.	"And They Shall Bow"	4:45

== Personnel ==
=== Front Line Assembly ===
- Bill Leeb – mixing, vocals
- Michael Balch – mixing

=== Technical personnel ===
- Manfred Schiek – sleeve design
- Dave Ogilvie – editing
