= Corrosion (album) =

Studio album by Front Line Assembly
- Released: February 1988
- Recorded: 1988
- Genre: Electro-industrial
- Length: 39:13
- Label: Third Mind, Wax Trax!

Front Line Assembly chronology
| State of Mind (1987) | Corrosion (1988) | Disorder (1988) |

Professional ratings
Review scores
| Source | Rating |
|---|---|
| AllMusic | 2/5 stars |
| Melody Maker | Favorable |
| Music Week | Favorable |
| NME | 8/10 |

Corrosion is the third full-length studio album by Vancouver industrial band Front Line Assembly, released in 1988.

== Track listing ==
All tracks are written by Bill Leeb and Michael Balch

Side One
| No. | Title | Length |
|---|---|---|
| 1. | "Lurid Sensation" | 4:05 |
| 2. | "Right Hand of Heaven" | 5:46 |
| 3. | "Concussion" | 4:14 |
| 4. | "On the Cross" | 5:49 |

Side Two
| No. | Title | Length |
|---|---|---|
| 5. | "Conflict" | 5:54 |
| 6. | "Controversy" | 5:20 |
| 7. | "Dark Dreams" | 6:05 |
| 8. | "The Wrack Part III – Wisdom" | 2:00 |

== Personnel ==
=== Front Line Assembly ===
- Bill Leeb – production, vocals
- Michael Balch – production

=== Additional musicians ===
- Paul Garrison – guitar (2)

=== Technical personnel ===
- Dave Ogilvie – mixing (1, 2, 6, 8)
- Maurice Conchis – cover design
