= Nerve War =

- Cover from the 2nd release

Demo album by Front Line Assembly
- Released: 1986
- Recorded: 1986
- Genre: Industrial
- Length: 90:00 or 93:00
- Label: Self-release

Front Line Assembly chronology
Nerve War (1986)	Total Terror (1986)

Nerve War is the first release by the Canadian band Front Line Assembly (known as Frontline Assembly at the time). Having a limited cassette release (between 50 and 100) in 1986, it remains the most sought-after release from Bill Leeb and company. The songs on the tape sound more abrasive and industrial than Leeb's subsequent output which leans more toward an EBM style. It has never been officially released after Front Line Assembly became more popular (supposedly the master tapes were lost), however, MP3s of it have appeared on the Internet since about 2002.

There are three different versions of Nerve War, with varying track listings, lengths, and titles. The original release included a song entitled "Thy Glory", which was removed from subsequent releases at the insistence of cEvin Key of Skinny Puppy, due to the usage of a bass line from his Tear Garden song. "The Steal" and "Cold As Ice" were also removed for reasons unknown, replaced with two untitled tracks. On a third version of Nerve War, "Thy Glory" reappears, along with new tracks "View To Kill", "To The World", "Holy War I" and "Holy War II".

== Track listing ==
Three different versions of Nerve War were released. Each version had a different ordering and songs unique to their version. The track lengths may also vary between copies since the original tapes were digitized.

=== Version 1 (Original) ===
Version 1 – Side A
No.	Title	Length
1.	"N-29"	7:06
2.	"Staahl"	4:30
3.	"Controversy"	5:38
4.	"Certain Style"	6:03
5.	"Power of Oppression"	5:58
6.	"The Steal"	7:10
7.	"Cold as Ice"	4:28
8.	"Thy Glory"	4:54
Total length:		45:42

Version 1 – Side B
No.	Title	Length
1.	"Front Line"	5:03
2.	"As of You"	4:56
3.	Untitled	3:50
4.	"Give It to Me!"	7:03
5.	"Shadows"	6:15
6.	"Take 2"	6:24
7.	"Overcome"	8:14
8.	"Excile"	4:51
Total length:		46:36

=== Version 2 ===
This version of the tape was created after cEvin Key insisted that "Thy Glory" be removed from the tape.

Version 2 – Side A
No.	Title	Length
1.	"N-29"	7:06
2.	"Staahl"	4:30
3.	"Controversy"	5:38
4.	"People"	5:50
5.	Untitled	5:39
6.	Untitled	6:02
7.	"Certain Style"	6:03
8.	"Power of Oppression"	5:58
Total length:		45:54

Version 2 – Side B
No.	Title	Length
1.	"Front Line"	5:03
2.	"As of You"	4:56
3.	Untitled	3:50
4.	"Give It to Me"	7:03
5.	"Shadows"	6:15
6.	"Take 2"	6:24
7.	"Overcome"	8:14
8.	"Excile"	4:51
Total length:		46:36

=== Version 3 ("promo-tape") ===
During an interview with the Depeche Mode Fan Club magazine, New Life, Bill Leeb presented the interviewer with a press briefcase that included a promo-tape. The track listing was incomplete and only listed 7 of the 14 tracks that were on the promo tape. Four of those listed songs were identified by either other releases or future releases. Two of the remaining tracks ("View To Kill" and "To The World") could be any of the untitled tracks, and "As of You" was not included on the promo tape. The rest of the tape was made up of songs from the other Nerve War versions, and other previously unreleased songs, some of which reappeared on future compilations.

Version 3
No.	Title	Length
1.	"Holy War I"	3:19
2.	"Certain Style" (Listed on tape cover)	6:18
3.	"Power of Oppression" (Listed on tape cover)	6:16
4.	"The Steal"	7:10
5.	Untitled	4:03
6.	"Front Line" (Listed on tape cover)	5:15
7.	Untitled	4:47
8.	Untitled	5:08
9.	Untitled	4:42
10.	"Thy Glory" (Listed on tape cover)	4:17
11.	"N-29"	7:09
12.	"Staahl"	4:38
13.	"Elusive"	6:11
14.	"Holy War II"	2:52
