= Civilization (Front Line Assembly album) =

Studio album by Front Line Assembly
- Released: January 20, 2004
- Recorded: 2003
- Genre: Electro-industrial, EBM, breakbeat
- Length: 56:50
- Label: Metropolis, Synthetic Symphony
- Producer: Bill Leeb, Rhys Fulber

Front Line Assembly chronology
Epitaph (2001)	Civilization (2004)	Artificial Soldier (2006)

Singles from Civilization
- 1. "Maniacal" Released: October 21, 2003; 2. "Vanished" Released: June 22, 2004

Professional ratings
Review scores
Source	Rating
AllMusic	2.5/5 stars
Barcode Magazine	7.6/10
Cleveland Scene	Favorable
DisAgreement	Favorable
Exclaim!	Mixed
Kerrang!	3/5 stars
musicOMH	Favorable
ReGen	Favorable
Rock Sound	9/10
Side-Line	9/10

Civilization is the twelfth full-length studio album by Vancouver industrial band Front Line Assembly, released on January 20, 2004, through Metropolis. The album was produced by band founder Bill Leeb and returning member Rhys Fulber, who had departed in 1996. Civilization has been described by reviewers as being a more stylistically diverse and relaxed album compared to the band's previous releases.

== Production ==
The album was produced and mixed digitally in a large part with the digital audio workstation software Pro Tools. Leeb and Fulber collaborated on site in Vancouver and remotely with Fulber residing in Los Angeles.

== Style and themes ==
Leeb considered the sound of the album "in some ways old-school", although produced with cutting-edge technology, saying, "I don't think we took any big leaps of faith as far as trying to do something that we never represented, so if you like the way Front Line ever sounded then I think you will really like the record a lot. [...] We just got together and did it the way we used to."

Leeb acknowledged the nihilistic theme of the album: "I'm still down on the world. [...] It’s hard to sometimes just really be positive about things."

== Release ==
=== Copy protection ===
Promotional copies of the album came with copy protection. Metropolis called it "an experimental run" and emphasized that the sales copies were delivered as regular CDs without protection.

=== Album errors ===
Metropolis mislabeled the back cover track listing of Civilization on at least three separate occasions. The errors included swapped song titles, missing the song "Parasite" and excluding the "Dissident" page in the booklet. These numerous errors led to rumors that Metropolis was releasing special edition copies of the album, all of which were false. While the track listing found on the back cover was incorrect, the liner notes still presented all the songs in the correct order, excluding copies with the missing "Dissident" page.

=== Singles ===
Civilization was accompanied by two singles. "Maniacal" was released about three months before the album. It contains the original version and a remix of the title track as well as the B-side "Anti". The follow-up to the album was the single "Vanished". It includes two remixes of the title track and the non-album tracks "Stürm", "Disseminate" and "Uncivilized". "Stürm" is also featured on the soundtrack album from horror film Saw. Both singles reached high positions in international charts (see Chart positions).

== Track listing ==
No.	Title	Length
1.	"Psychosomatic"	5:35
2.	"Maniacal"	5:14
3.	"Transmitter" (Accidentally listed as "Fragmented" on some track lists)	5:38
4.	"Vanished"	6:25
5.	"Strategic"	1:52
6.	"Civilization"	6:43
7.	"Fragmented" (Accidentally listed as "Transmitter" on some track lists)	6:22
8.	"Parasite" (Missing from some track lists)	6:13
9.	"Dissident"	5:29
10.	"Schicksal"	7:19

== Personnel ==
=== Front Line Assembly ===
- Bill Leeb – production, vocals
- Rhys Fulber – production, programming

=== Additional musicians ===
- Jamie Muhoberac – vocals (6), keyboard (6, 9)
- Leah Randi – vocals (1, 3, 4), bass (6)
- Sean Ashby – electric guitar (4)
- Christian Olde Wolbers – electric guitar (6)

=== Technical personnel ===
- Greg Reely – mixing, special editing
- Brian Gardner – mastering
- Carylann Loeppky – graphic design
- US Department Of Energy Photograph – photo

== Chart positions ==
=== Album ===
Chart (2004)	Peak position
German Alternative Albums (Deutsche Alternative Charts)	2

=== Singles ===
==== "Maniacal" ====
Chart (2003)	Peak position
German Alternative Singles (Deutsche Alternative Charts)	4
Billboard Hot Dance Singles	15

==== "Vanished" ====
Chart (2004)	Peak position
German Alternative Singles (Deutsche Alternative Charts)	10
UK Rock & Metal (OCC)	21
