= Implode (album) =

Studio album by Front Line Assembly
- Released: April 27, 1999
- Recorded: 1999, Hippo-sonic Studios
- Genre: Electro-industrial, big beat, trip hop, IDM
- Length: 65:22
- Label: Metropolis, Zoth Ommog, Energy
- Producer: Bill Leeb, Chris Peterson, Dan Handrabur

Front Line Assembly chronology
Monument (1998)	Implode (1999)	Cryogenic Studio, Vol. 2 (2000)

Singles from Implode
- 1. "Prophecy" Released: May 4, 1999; 2. "Fatalist" Released: October 5, 1999

Professional ratings
Review scores
Source	Rating
AllMusic	4/5 stars
Barcode	Mixed
CMJ New Music Monthly	Mixed
Exclaim!	Mixed
Outburn	Favorable
Prospective	7/10
Release	7/10
Rock Sound	4.5/5 stars
Side-Line	8.5/10

Implode is the tenth full-length studio album by industrial group Front Line Assembly. The album was released through Metropolis on April 27, 1999.

== Release and promotion ==
Implode was released on digipak CD and via Zoth Ommog on gatefold cover sleeve double vinyl with limited circulation of 2,000. The track "Torched" is featured in the 2002 horror film Resident Evil but not on the accompanying soundtrack.

Originally, Implode was supposed to be the last Front Line Assembly release for Metropolis.

=== Singles ===
Implode was followed by the release of two singles. The single "Prophecy" includes the original version, a radio edit and a remix of the title track. "Unknown Dreams" is also featured as radio edit. "Paralysis" is a non-album track. The second single, "Fatalist", was released in different versions in Europe and North America. German label Zoth Ommog issued a four-track single that contains remixes of "Fatalist" (Rhys Fulber), "Retribution" (Front 242) and "Prophecy" (Haujobb) as well as non-album track "Deception". The six track version was released for the Scandinavian countries through Energy and in the United States through Metropolis. Additional tracks on this version are two remixes of "Fatalist" by Aqualite and Tribal Techno.

=== Touring ===
In August 1999, Front Line Assembly confirmed dates for a North America tour in October and November 1999 with Dutch rock band and label colleagues Clan of Xymox as support. However, the tour was cancelled because the necessary financing could not be secured.

== Track listing ==
All tracks are written by Bill Leeb and Chris Peterson

No.	Title	Length
1.	"Retribution"	5:28
2.	"Fatalist"	5:43
3.	"Prophecy"	6:23
4.	"Synthetic Forms"	8:05
5.	"Falling"	5:32
6.	"Don't Trust Anyone"	4:19
7.	"Unknown Dreams"	6:01
8.	"Torched"	5:59
9.	"Machine Slave"	6:58
10.	"Silent Ceremony" (The song "Silent Ceremony" ends at 6:10. After one minute of silence, at 7:10, begins the hidden track "Stalker".)	10:54

== Personnel ==
=== Front Line Assembly ===
- Bill Leeb – production, vocals
- Chris Peterson – production, performer

=== Additional musicians ===
- Jed Simon – guitar

=== Technical personnel ===
- Dan Handrabur – additional programming, additional production
- Greg Reely – mixing, editing
- Sean Thingvold – assistant editing
- Ted Jansen – mastering
- Dave McKean – design, photography, illustration
- Max McMullin – 3-D programming
