= Total Terror =

Demo album by Front Line Assembly
- Released: 1986 (remastered 1993)
- Recorded: Gotham Studios (Rerelease 1993)
- Genre: Electro-industrial
- Label: Self-release, Dossier / Cleopatra Records (Rerelease)

Front Line Assembly chronology
Nerve War (1986)	Total Terror (1986)	The Initial Command (1987)

Professional ratings
Review scores
Source	Rating
AllMusic (Total Terror, Pt. 1)	2.5/5 stars
AllMusic (Complete Total Terror)	3/5 stars

Total Terror is the second of two self-released cassette tapes by industrial music band Front Line Assembly. At this point, Bill Leeb was the band's only dedicated member, with some help from Rhys Fulber.

== Background ==
After the second demo cassette Michael Balch became a member of Front Line Assembly. It also paved the way for a release on a label since the band received offers from several labels to record an album.

== Release ==
The album was mostly remastered and rereleased on CD in 1993 as Total Terror I, and followed up by a companion collection of same-period demos, Total Terror II, a year later. These have been collected into Complete Total Terror.

In Germany, both CDs were released 1993 by now defunct label Dossier.

Polish label Mecanica issued vinyl editions of both albums in summer 2002, together with bonus tracks from other sessions and compilations.

In 2004, Cleopatra reissued Total Terror I and Total Terror II in a two-CD package, with new cover art, under the title Complete Total Terror. Despite its name, it does not include "Eternal".

Cleopatra re-released the albums as part of a box set, Permanent Data 1986–1989, on CD and digitally on August 19, 2022, with bonus tracks including "Eternal". All albums in the set were remastered by Jürgen Engler of German industrial metal group Die Krupps.

== Original cassette track listing ==
Side 1
No.	Title	Length
1.	"Total Terror"	6:32
2.	"A Decade"	5:00
3.	"Rebels In Afghanistan"	5:15
4.	"Eternal"	3:41
5.	"Developing Suicide"	4:43
6.	"Black Fluid"	2:57

Side 2
No.	Title	Length
1.	"Falling There"	4:26
2.	"All You Do"	4:16
3.	"Seeing Is Believing"	4:32
4.	"Empty Walls"	4:44
5.	"Enemy Number One"	4:13
6.	"On the Cross"	5:53

== Total Terror I ==
Most of the original cassette was later remastered and commercially released on CD in 1993 as Total Terror I (fully titled Total Terror Part I: Official Demos 1986) on Cleopatra Records and Dossier. It does not include "Eternal", which remains unreleased on CD or vinyl, but added three previously unreleased bonus tracks from other sessions in 1986: "Freedom", "Distorted Vision" and "Cleanser".

The German release gave some explanations about the production and the reason for the release on the back cover:

All the songs on this CD are the first ever recordings by Frontline Assembly. Original recordings were constructed in 1986, on nothing more than an eight track recording system. This is quite primitive by today's standards. The sound quality will not be as effective as our new recordings. However, the ideas are all there. We have decided to release Total Terror (unavailable release since 1986) due to popular demand, and to stop the bootlegging of Total Terror which we do not approve of. All of the songs have been re-mixed plus a few other songs which have never been released.

No.	Title	Length
1.	"Total Terror"	6:25
2.	"A Decade"	5:01
3.	"Rebels In Afghanistan"	5:14
4.	"Developing Suicide"	4:42
5.	"Black Fluid"	5:35
6.	"Falling There"	4:28
7.	"All You Do"	4:22
8.	"Seeing Is Believing"	4:34
9.	"Empty Walls"	4:45
10.	"Enemy Number One"	4:20
11.	"On The Cross"	5:52
12.	"Freedom"	5:46
13.	"Distorted Vision"	5:45
14.	"Cleanser"	2:18
Total length:		1.1 hours

== Total Terror II ==
Total Terror II, a collection of 1986–1987 remastered Front Line Assembly demos, was released on Cleopatra Records in 1994, fulfilling the promise latent in the title of the previous year's Total Terror I. It included 13 previously unreleased tracks:

Side 2
No.	Title	Length
1.	"Assassination"	5:57
2.	"Intensive Care Unit"	5:05
3.	"Immobilized"	4:11
4.	"They're Going to Kill Us" (Misspelled "There" on some versions)	5:52
5.	"Stimulant Combat"	6:10
6.	"Hatred by Society"	4:11
7.	"Intruder"	5:25
8.	"Facepuller"	7:03
9.	"A.E.C. Krunch"	6:22
10.	"Cro-Magnon"	6:17
11.	"Guilty"	2:24
12.	"Attack Decay"	3:59
13.	"The Boneing"	5:25
Total length:		1.2 hours

== Personnel ==
- Bill Leeb – remixing (Rerelease 1993), vocals
- Rhys Fulber – remixing (Rerelease 1993)
- Jürgen Engler – remastering (Rerelease 2022)
