= Fear Is the Mindkiller =

EP by Fear Factory
- Released: April 14, 1993
- Recorded: May 1992
- Genre: Death metal, industrial metal
- Length: 32:40
- Label: Roadrunner
- Producer: Colin Richardson

Fear Factory chronology
Soul of a New Machine (1992)	Fear Is the Mindkiller (1993)	Demanufacture (1995)

Professional ratings
Review scores
Source	Rating
AllMusic	3/5 stars
Collector's Guide to Heavy Metal	5/10

Fear Is the Mindkiller is the first EP by American industrial metal band Fear Factory. It was released on April 14, 1993, by Roadrunner Records and it contains remixes of songs from the first album Soul of a New Machine.

== Content ==
Remixes 1–5 were created by Rhys Fulber and Bill Leeb of Front Line Assembly. The EP was remastered and re-released on October 5, 2004, in a digipak, packaged together with the remastered Soul of a New Machine without "Self Immolation". The title of the record is a quote from "Litany against fear", a fictional incantation from Dune, the science fiction novel written by Frank Herbert.

When playing live in the 1990s, the band would occasionally play a variation of the Deep Dub Trauma remix of "Scumgrief", rather than the original. The song is also on the soundtrack of the film Hideaway.

== Track listing ==
No.	Title	Length
1.	"Martyr" (Suffer Bastard Mix)	7:14
2.	"Self Immolation" (Vein Tap Mix)	5:32
3.	"Scapegoat" (Pigfuck Mix)	4:37
4.	"Scumgrief" (Deep Dub Trauma Mix)	6:20
5.	"Self Immolation" (Liquid Sky Mix)	6:06
6.	"Self Immolation" (Original Version)	2:46
Total length:		32:40

== Personnel ==
=== Fear Factory ===
- Burton C. Bell − vocals
- Dino Cazares − guitar
- Raymond Herrera − drums
- Andrew Shives – bass
- Raynor Diego – keyboards

=== Production ===
- Rhys Fulber − digital adaptation
- Brian Gardner − mastering
- Bernie Grundman − mastering
- Karl Kotas − art direction, computer graphics
- Ron Obvious − facility consultant
- Greg Reely − sonic architect
- Colin Richardson − producer
- Ira Rosenson − photography
- Joel Van Dyke − sonic assistance
