= Gashed Senses & Crossfire =

Album by Front Line Assembly

Studio album by Front Line Assembly
- Released: April 1, 1989
- Recorded: Vancouver Studios, Ltd. Vision
- Genre: Electro-industrial
- Length: 44:43
- Label: Third Mind, Wax Trax!, Roadrunner
- Producer: Bill Leeb, Michael Balch

Front Line Assembly chronology
Convergence (1988)	Gashed Senses & Crossfire (1989)	Live (1989)

Singles from Gashed Senses & Crossfire
- 1. "Digital Tension Dementia" Released: November 1988; 2. "No Limit (Damaged Goods Remix)" Released: August 5, 1989

Gashed Senses & Crossfire is the fourth full-length studio album by Canadian industrial artist Front Line Assembly. The song "Shutdown" features a clip of dialogue taken from the beginning of the 1987 film Hamburger Hill.

== Release ==
In October 2019, Canadian label Artoffact started a crowdfunding campaign in order to obtain the album licenses and to re-release the album on vinyl on May 4, 2020.

=== Singles ===
==== "Digital Tension Dementia" ====
1. "Digital Tension Dementia" (7:15)
2. "Vexation" (8:23)
3. "Big Money (Remix)" (4:15)

"Digital Tension Dementia" is the first single by Front Line Assembly and the first single taken from Gashed Senses & Crossfire. The single was released in November 1988 on Third Mind in the United Kingdom and Belgium and in the United States via Wax Trax! Records. It was their first Billboard chart appearance in the U.S.

==== "No Limit (Damaged Goods Remix)" ====
1. "No Limit (Damaged Goods Remix)" (7:38)
2. "Lethal Compound (Harmful If Swallowed Mix)" (11:08)
3. "No Limit (Spontaneous Combustion Mix)" (5:27)

"No Limit" is the second single from the album.

== Reception ==
Professional ratings
Review scores
Source	Rating
AllMusic	4.5/5 stars
Melody Maker	Favorable
New Musical Express	5/10
Rear Garde	Favorable
Santa Sangre Magazine	Favorable
Select	3/5 medals
Suburban Voice	Favorable

Billboard listed "Digital Tension Dementia" in its single reviews in the recommended section, which signifies "records with potential for significant chart action".

== Track listing ==
All tracks are written by Bill Leeb and Michael Balch

No.	Title	Length
1.	"No Limit"	4:53
2.	"Antisocial"	4:41
3.	"Hypocrisy"	3:48
4.	"Shutdown"	5:24
5.	"Prayer"	3:29
6.	"Digital Tension Dementia"	4:46
7.	"Big Money"	4:15
8.	"Bloodsport"	5:55
9.	"Foolsgame"	3:36
10.	"Sedation"	3:56

== Personnel ==
=== Front Line Assembly ===
- Bill Leeb – production, vocals, electronic instruments
- Michael Balch – production, engineering (1, 6, 7), electronic instruments

=== Additional musicians ===
- Dave Hall – bass (9)

=== Technical personnel ===
- Anthony Valcic – engineering (1, 6, 7)
- Dave Coppenhall – artwork

== Chart positions ==
=== Digital Tension Dementia ===
Chart (1988)	Peak position
US Dance Club Songs (Billboard)	45
