= Caustic Grip =

Studio album by Front Line Assembly
- Released: August 1990
- Recorded: 1989–1990
- Studio: Vancouver (Vancouver)
- Genres: Electro-industrial, industrial dance
- Length: 41:29; 51:45 (CD)
- Labels: Third Mind, Wax Trax!, Roadrunner
- Producers: Bill Leeb, Rhys Fulber

Front Line Assembly chronology
Live (1989)	Caustic Grip (1990)	Tactical Neural Implant (1992)

Singles from Caustic Grip
- 1. "Iceolate" Released: August 6, 1990; 2. "Provision" Released: 1990

Caustic Grip is the fifth full-length studio album by Front Line Assembly, originally released on Third Mind Records in Europe and on Wax Trax! Records in the United States in 1990.

== Background ==
The album was the first without co-founding member Michael Balch after Rhys Fulber became a full-time member of the band. Originally intended to record the successor to Gashed Senses & Crossfire together with Leeb, Balch took on tour obligations for Ministry and Revolting Cocks. Leeb decided not to wait and started working with Fulber. Fulber had already worked with Leeb on the Total Terror demo and taken part in the Gashed Senses & Crossfire tour.

Caustic Grip also marked the beginning of the long-standing collaboration with Canadian record producer Greg Reely who assumed mixing duties on the album. The band brought him in because they were impressed by his work with other electronic bands and his reputation. The recording was funded with a budget of $20,000 by Third Mind's Gary Levermore.

== Production ==
The band wrote and programmed the whole album in Leeb's apartment with analog equipment, a turntable and a cassette deck, while mixing and recording of the vocals took place at Vancouver Studios within ten days.

== Release ==
The album was reissued by Roadrunner in 1992 and in 2003 as part of a two-disc set that also includes the Gashed Senses & Crossfire album. Up until the year 1994, when Roadrunner acquired the rights to all Third Mind releases, Caustic Grip sold at least 70,000 units.

In October 2019, Canadian label Artoffact started a crowdfunding campaign in order to obtain the album licenses and to re-release the album on vinyl on May 4, 2020.

On the occasion of the 35th anniversary of its original release, Wax Trax! announced the reissue of the album on vinyl, to be released on September 19, 2025. The pressings were the first release of the track "The Chair" on vinyl, since it was available only as CD bonus track at the time.

=== Singles ===
"Iceolate" is the first single taken from Caustic Grip. The single was released on August 6, 1990, through Third Mind in Europe and in the United States via Wax Trax!. Along with the original version of the title track the single contains CD-only track "Mental Distortion" and on the CD single a remix of "Iceolate". A promotional music video for "Iceolate" was created and received airplay on MTV. The track also was ranked 85 in the COMA Music Magazine feature 101 Greatest Industrial Songs of All Time.

The second single from the album was "Provision". It contains the original version of the title track as well as a remix of album track "Overkill".

Music magazine Melody Maker made both album singles single of the week in 1990.

The following single, "Virus", features a non-album track of the same name and was released on February 21, 1991, through Third Mind for Europe and by Wax Trax in the United States. It was created during the sessions for Caustic Grip. The different release formats include tracks also appearing on the album – "Provision", "Iceolate" and "Mental Distortion" – as well as remixes of "Virus", "Resist" and "Overkill".

All singles, together with the "Mindphaser" single, were re-released in 1998 on the compilation album The Singles: Four Fit through Zoth Ommog.

== Reception ==
Professional ratings
Review scores
Source	Rating
AllMusic	4.5/5 stars
Jersey Beat	Favorable
Select	4/5 medals

The single "Virus" was well received in Billboard's single reviews: "Cream of the industrial crop threatens to shatter club walls with ear-blasting sonic rave."

Dele Fadele of NME said, "Their punishing electronics is akin to having all your teeth pulled out at once and a skin graft. And more decisively, the beer-monster chanted vocal style should be enough to scare away all but the strongest of hearts."

== Track listing ==
All tracks are written by Bill Leeb and Rhys Fulber.

No.	Title	Length
1.	"Resist"	5:25
2.	"Victim"	5:06
3.	"Overkill"	5:23
4.	"Forge"	4:21
5.	"Provision"	6:09
6.	"Force Fed"	4:41
7.	"Iceolate"	5:13
8.	"Threshold"	5:11

CD only tracks
No.	Title	Length
9.	"Mental Distortion"	6:50
10.	"The Chair"	3:26

== Personnel ==
=== Front Line Assembly ===
- Bill Leeb – vocals, production
- Rhys Fulber – production

=== Additional musicians ===
- Jeff Stoddard – guitar (5)

=== Technical personnel ===
- Greg Reely – mixing
- Ken Marshall – studio technician
- Steve Royea – studio technician
- Christian Mumenthaler – computer images
- Sleeping Partner – design
