= Front Line Assembly =

Canadian electro-industrial band

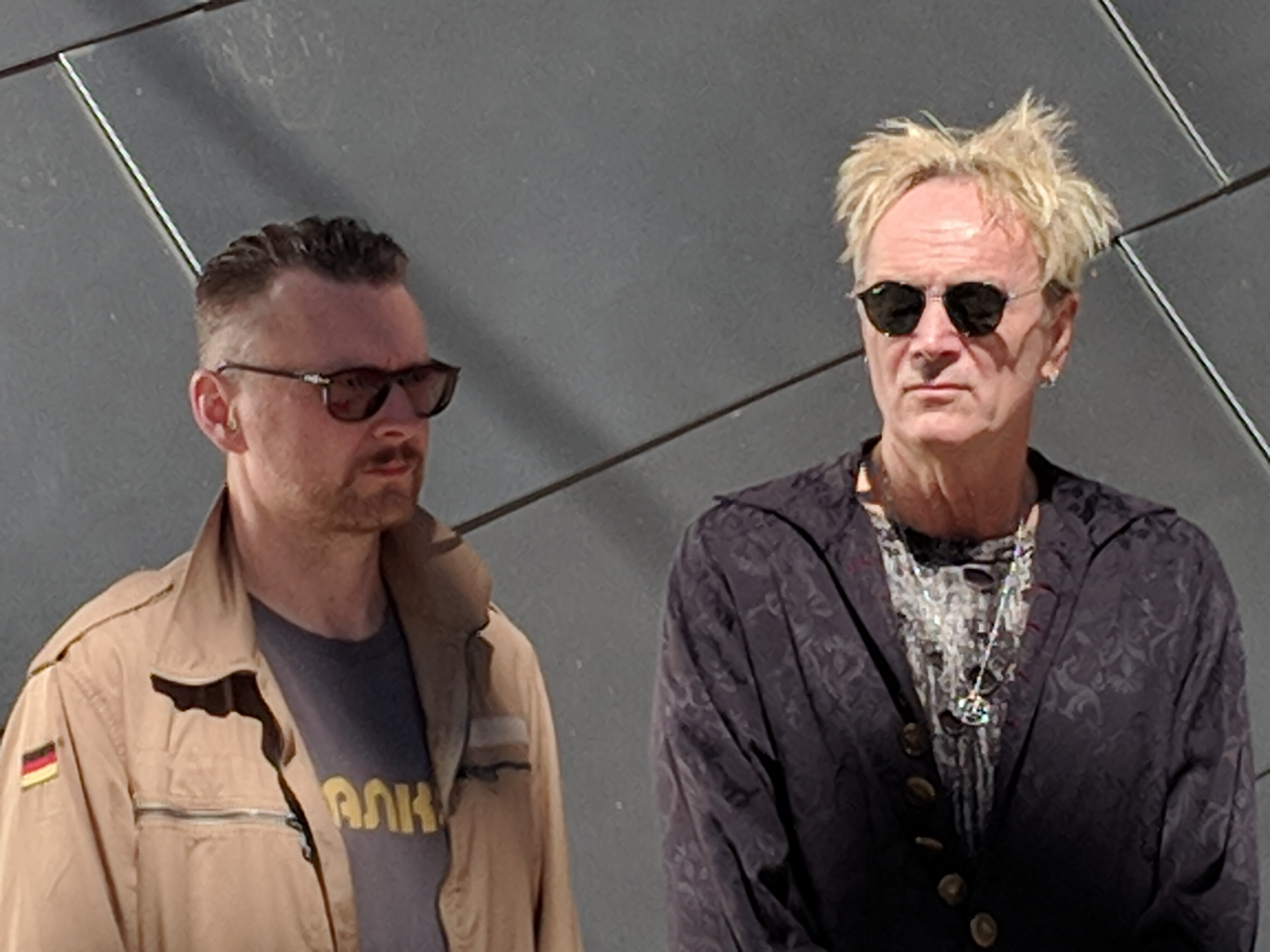
- Rhys Fulber (left) and Bill Leeb

Background information
- Origin: Vancouver, British Columbia, Canada
- Genres: Industrial; EBM; electro-industrial
- Years active: 1986–present
- Labels: Third Mind; Wax Trax!; Roadrunner; Cleopatra; Off Beat; Metropolis; Dependent; Zoth Ommog
- Spinoffs: Delerium
- Members: Bill Leeb; Rhys Fulber
- Past members: Michael Balch; Chris Peterson; Jeremy Inkel; Jared Slingerland
- Website: www.mindphaser.com

Front Line Assembly (FLA) is a Canadian electro-industrial band formed by Bill Leeb in 1986 after leaving Skinny Puppy. FLA has developed its own sound incorporating elements of electronic body music and electro-industrial. The band's membership has rotated through the years, including Michael Balch, Rhys Fulber, and Chris Peterson, all of whom are associated with several other acts.

Since their inception, the group have produced over a dozen studio albums and EPs, several of which have charted on Billboard's Top Dance/Electronic Album chart. The albums Tactical Neural Implant and Hard Wired are two of the group's most successful records, the former being considered a classic among industrial music fans. They have also produced soundtracks for video games such as Quake III: Team Arena (a collaboration with Sonic Mayhem) and AirMech.

Over the years, the band's name has sometimes been published as "Front Line Assembly", and sometimes as "Frontline Assembly". The former spelling is the most common, and the band's members have stated that the version with three separate words is preferred.

== History ==
=== Formation (1985–1986) ===
Between 1985 and 1986, Bill Leeb performed with Skinny Puppy under the name Wilhelm Schroeder, a combination of his first name and the name of the Peanuts character and was meant as a joke. Leeb had no musical training, and learned to play synthesizer while contributing bass synth and backing vocals for the band. He also supported their 1985 tour. Not prepared for another tour, Leeb left Skinny Puppy in early 1986.

Having developed some instrumental skills and music industry experience, and wanting to do more vocal work, Leeb decided to take the risk of starting his own project. Leeb decided to call the project Front Line Assembly to reflect his belief that strength lies in working together.

Leeb started by producing a demo tape, Nerve War, which was distributed on a limited basis. Contacts in the music scene he had gathered while with Skinny Puppy led to contract offers from the first two labels that Leeb later approached with cassettes.

Around this time, Leeb and Rhys Fulber became friends when they discovered they both had a similar interest in underground music. As an unofficial member at this time, Fulber partnered with Leeb during the production of Total Terror and was credited for the song "Black Fluid" on the demo. Both demo releases were limited to 100 and mostly distributed amongst friends.

=== Early releases and Michael Balch (1987–1989) ===
The band members were influenced by early electronic and industrial acts from Europe such as Kraftwerk, Cabaret Voltaire, Portion Control, D.A.F., Test Dept, SPK, and Severed Heads, but mainly by the electronic body music style of Front 242.

The first appearance of Front Line Assembly was the track "Aggression", which was included on the compilation For Your Ears Only, released in 1987 by British independent record label Third Mind showcasing the label's repertoire at the time. The track would be re-released the following year on the Disorder EP. Although the contact to Third Mind would later develop into a long-standing collaboration, the band debuted its first album The Initial Command with credited assistance by Fulber and Michael Balch on Belgian independent record label KK at the end of 1987. The album had been produced on a tight budget which would determine whether or not cuts would be done with an eight track system or split into two four track cuts. With the next album State of Mind, released in January 1988, the band switched to German independent label Dossier. They changed labels as Leeb did not want to be bound to one label, so the releases were issued only on European labels.

In 1988, Balch became an official band member and began writing songs alongside Leeb for the next few albums. Balch mostly contributed by providing keyboards and programming. This partnership produced the releases Corrosion and Disorder. A planned release on the Canadian label Nettwerk fell through, and the two finished masters were issued instead by Third Mind in 1988. After the releases in 1988, Third Mind signed Front Line Assembly to a three album deal. Through Levermore Corrosion was licensed to Wax Trax!. Both records were re-released together with three more unreleased tracks on the compilations Convergence later that year and Corroded Disorder in 1995.

Adhering to Third Mind for Europe and Wax Trax! for North America resulted in better availability of the albums in both places, and the signing with Third Mind attracted the attention of established music magazines, including Melody Maker or NME as well as the underground magazine Music From the Empty Quarter.

Front Line Assembly produced their next album Gashed Senses & Crossfire in 1989. This album introduced their first single Digital Tension Dementia, which became their first chart success and peaked at position 45 of the Billboard Hot Dance Club Songs chart. In support of their latest release, the band, together with Fulber as live metal percussionist, headed out to Europe and North America for their first tour. However, during the show in London in July 1989 their first live album Live was recorded under unfavourable circumstances. Presumably not well attended, the audience's reactions at the show had to be reworked. For Balch it was also the last Front Line Assembly tour because he parted ways to join Ministry and Revolting Cocks.

=== Rhys Fulber and growing popularity (1990–1999) ===
Filling the void left by Balch's departure, Fulber officially joined. The two musicians had similar tastes, both being enthusiastic about electronic music. The duo recorded their next album, Caustic Grip, in the first half of 1990. Accompanied by the release of two singles in 1990, "Iceolate" and "Provision", the album raised Front Line Assembly's profile in the industrial music scene and in the media considerably. Melody Maker elected both album singles Single of the week while the promotional video for "Iceolate" received some airplay on MTV.

On Caustic Grip the band started working with Greg Reely which would evolve into a long-term partnership. The tour in support of the album started in January 1991 in the United States to be followed by a European leg in February which was accompanied by the release of stand-alone single Virus the same month. Chris Peterson, who would later become a full-time member of Front Line Assembly, gave his debut for the band on this tour, completing the live line-up as percussionist.

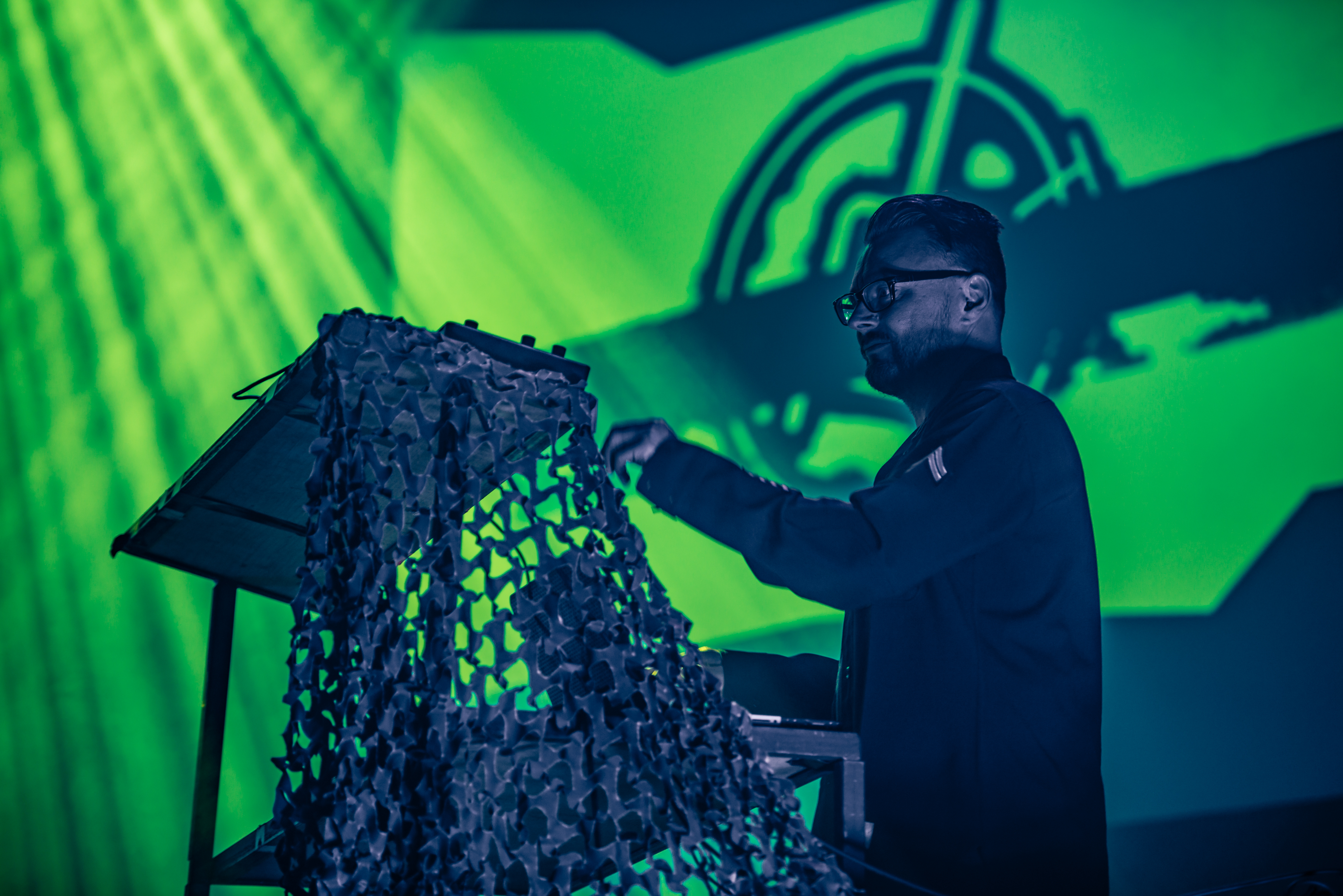
Rhys Fulber performing with Front Line Assembly in 2016

In 1992, Front Line Assembly reached a turning point in the band's musical style with the album Tactical Neural Implant. The media, including Melody Maker, Siren Magazine and fanzine Industrial Strength all commented particularly on the more melodious approach featured on the album and noted the use of multi-layered sounds which would become a trademark of the band. Asked about this composing style by Industrial Nation, Leeb explained that the band continually experimented with new ways to use technology to make each recording different, and had focused on clarity and sustain in their instrumentation and structure in their songs.

The video for the first single off the album, "Mindphaser", was awarded "Best Alternative Video" at Much Music's 1992 Canadian Music Video Awards. In August 1992, Front Line Assembly embarked on a tour that covered Northern America and Europe. The album continues to be played in industrial and electronic music dance clubs and is considered a classic among listeners and musicians of industrial music.

In 1993, the band contributed 5 remixes to Fear Factory's EP Fear Is the Mindkiller; working on the EP would eventually influence the band's next album Millennium (1994), which featured a combination of metal guitars, electronic music, and media sampling (much of which was taken from the Michael Douglas film Falling Down) which had become one of the characteristics of industrial rock and industrial metal during the 1990s. Hard Wired (1995) and the world tour following the release was FLA's most successful commercial and critical period. Leeb has stated he was influenced to pursue this style of music after listening to Pantera's "Walk", which he later incorporated into the single "Surface Patterns".

In September 1996 the band made a live performance in Vancouver for the MuchMusic Video Awards which was broadcast via satellite.

=== Years without Fulber, return to electronica (1997–2000) ===
In 1997, Fulber left the band to concentrate on producing Fear Factory with other bands. Chris Peterson, who had already supported the band's live shows, replaced Fulber. Soon after Fulber's departure, the album [FLA]vour of the Weak was released. Yet again, the album was stylistically divergent from previous releases. The metal influences found in Millennium gave way to a more electronica sound within the new release.

Front Line Assembly returned somewhat to their former sound with the album Implode (1999). Front Line Assembly composed the soundtrack for the video game, Quake III Team Arena and was composing music for the video game Millennium Four: The Right that was later cancelled. In October 1999, it was made public that the band had left their label Metropolis.

The band followed up Implode with the 2001 album Epitaph. This was the final album worked on by Peterson before departing in 2002. The album was a critical success and spawned the single "Everything Must Perish". The album also marked the band's return to Metropolis records.

=== Success in the new millennium (2000–2011) ===
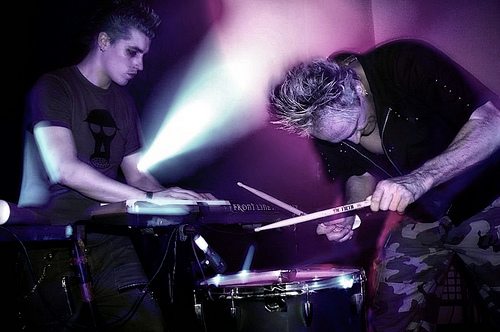
Bill Leeb and Jeremy Inkel performing in 2007

Fulber rejoined the band in 2003. The reunited duo released the single "Maniacal" in October of that year. The single peaked at No. 15 on Billboard's Hot Dance Singles. The next year, they released the studio album Civilization, which landed the No. 2 position on the German Alternative Albums chart. Peterson later rejoined the band to release Artificial Soldier in 2006. It was the first album to feature new members Jeremy Inkel and Jared Slingerland. The album peaked on Billboard's Top Dance/Electronic Albums chart at No. 19. After a problem with the tour bus company, the US tour that year was cut short, and the band returned home to Vancouver after playing roughly half of their scheduled dates; performances in New York and Canada were cancelled. The band toured in Europe in August 2006, playing in 18 cities.

In April 2007, Front Line Assembly released a remix album titled Fallout. The album was released in a 4-panel digipak and featured three previously unreleased tracks ("Electric Dreams," "Unconscious," and "Armageddon") and nine remixes by several other Industrial acts and names. After the release of the remix album, the band went out to tour North America and Europe.

In 2010, Front Line Assembly released two new singles, "Shifting Through the Lens" and "Angriff", and an album, Improvised Electronic Device; I.E.D. saw the band embrace a heavier, more guitar-driven sound, much like Millennium. The album reached No. 23 on Billboard's Top Dance/Electronic Albums chart and was supported by a series of tours throughout North America and Europe. Peterson once more left the band, starting a T-shirt company with his brother. The band completed the line-up with live drummer Jason Bazinet.

=== Back to electronic roots and new influences (2012–2018) ===
Having integrated guitars into their sound since the late 1980s, either sampled or as live guitars, FLA returned in 2012 to making exclusively electronic music. This change was heard on the soundtrack album AirMech for the video game of the same name at the end of 2012. Comprising only instrumental tracks, AirMech laid some grounds for 2013 full-length album Echogenetic Echogenetic was widely praised by critics, who also noted the dubstep influences on the record, and hit the charts in the United States and in Germany. Entering the official German charts was a first in the band's history. On the occasion of the release of Echogenetic Front Line Assembly announced a remix album which was released in May 2014 under the moniker of Echoes.

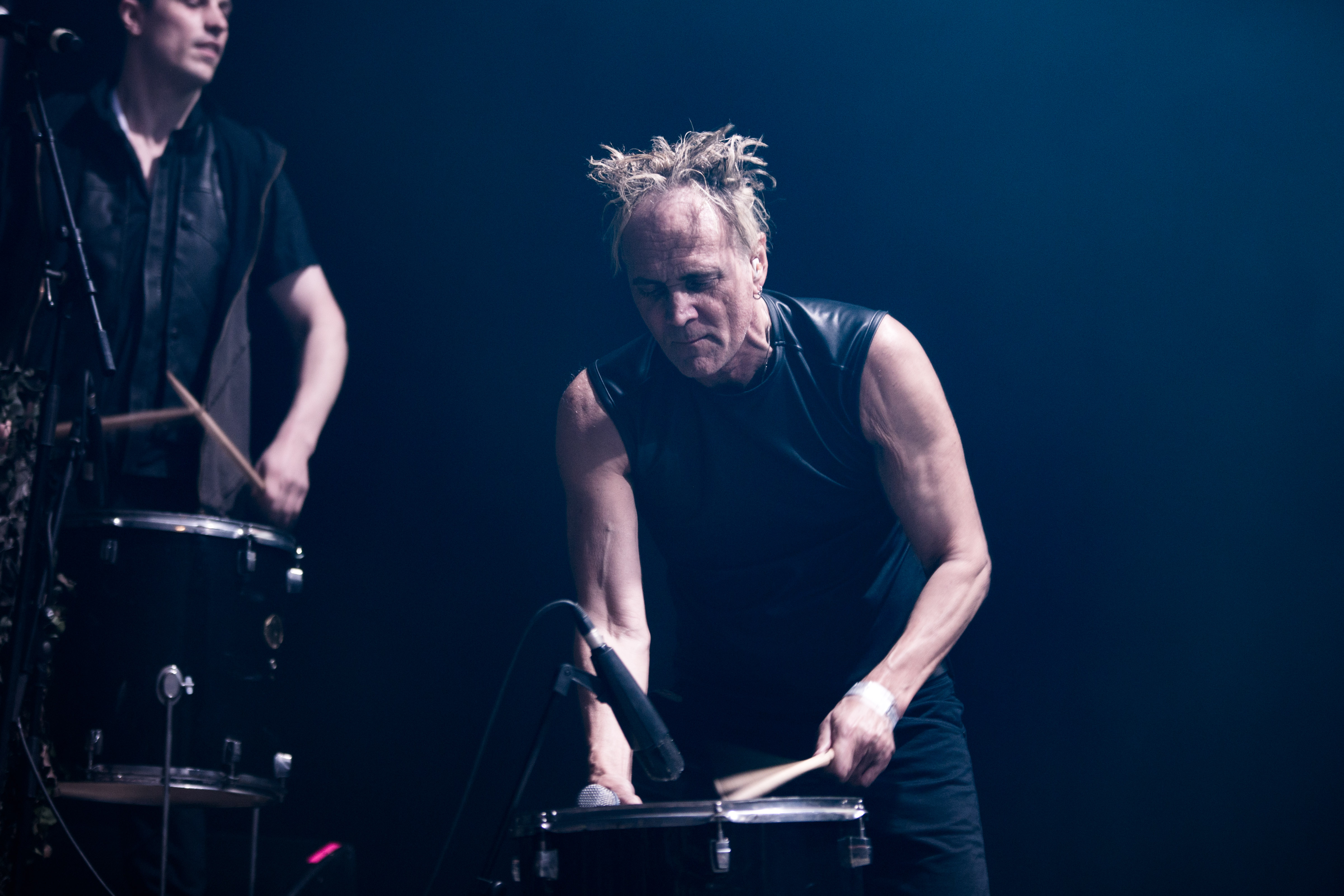
Bill Leeb (right) and Jeremy Inkel performing in 2016

Shortly after the release of Echogenetic the band started promoting the album with an extensive tour schedule in Europe and North America. In August 2013, Front Line Assembly covered dates in Russia, Germany, Hungary, the Czech Republic, and the UK. They continued their tour in Europe in June 2014, playing shows in Slovakia, the Czech Republic, Germany, Sweden, Finland and France, this time also in support of Echoes. Former member Fulber joined the band for their last European leg in October and November 2014 in Poland and Germany, where they performed with a philharmonic orchestra in Leipzig, a first for the band.

The same month Front Line Assembly returned from Europe, they were asked on short notice to join Leeb's former band Skinny Puppy on their Eye vs Spy North American tour as supporting band after VNV Nation, previously booked for the slot, had opted out. On some dates, Fulber joined them. At the Vancouver show Leeb performed with Skinny Puppy on their encore song Assimilate.

Resuming tour activities, the band gave a number of concerts in September and November 2015. They started off with a show in Vancouver and went on to headline the second day of the Cold Waves industrial festival in Chicago. The accompanying festival CD, released in October, featured an exclusive remix of Next War from Slighter. In November the band followed up with their first show in Mexico City, supported by Mexican electro-industrial band Hocico, and a gig in Guadalajara both of which were also supported by Canadian electro-industrial group Decoded Feedback.

October 2014 saw the return of former long-time band member Rhys Fulber, joining Front Line Assembly on their European tour. In late October 2016, the band announced that a new album was in the making, including contributions by Rhys Fulber, In March 2017 an announcement followed that the successor of sound track album AirMech was ready for release. The band supported industrial rock band Revolting Cocks on their North American tour the same year.

Keyboardist Jeremy Inkel died January 23, 2018, due to complications resulting from an asthma condition, at the age of 34.

=== Leeb and Fulber continue as duo (2018–present) ===
In March 2018 the band announced a joint European tour with German electro-industrial band Die Krupps under the moniker of "The Machinists United Tour 2018". The tour was preceded by the release of the soundtrack album WarMech, successor of 2015's AirMech, in June. Also, the band completed work on their 17th studio album, Wake Up the Coma, which was released in February 2019.

In early 2020, industrial metal band Ministry announced that Front Line Assembly and industrial rock band KMFDM would be part of their "The Industrial Strength Tour". Concerns related to the COVID-19 pandemic prompted Ministry to reschedule the tour several times, ultimately removing Front Line Assembly from the tour. In response to these changes, Front Line Assembly issued a statement via social media, saying that they didn't receive a full explanation for their removal from the line-up.

In October 2020, the band announced a new album, titled Mechanical Soul. It was released on January 15, 2021 through Metropolis and featured guest appearances from Jean-Luc De Meyer of Front 242 and Dino Cazares of Fear Factory.

In late 2021 the band announced that they were going to support Mechanical Soul with tours in the United States and Europe. In May and June 2022, they were joined by Swedish EBM artist Rein on their US "Mechanical Soul Tour". They followed up co-headlining "The Machinists Re-United Tour" in August 2022 in Europe with German band Die Krupps.

Coinciding with "The Machinists Reunited Tour", Cleopatra issued a remastered collection of Front Line Assembly's early works in August 2022. "Permanent Data 1986-1989" comprises the demo compilations Total Terror I and Total Terror II, the regular releases State of Mind, Corrosion and Disorder as well as the band's first live album. At the same time, Cleopatra re-released the band's remastered first demo Nerve War.

Between October 2023 and January 2025 Artoffact released a series of singles with remixes of songs from 2018 soundtrack album WarMech mostly by artists signed to Artoffact. All singles were compiled on the album Mechviruses, released in February 2025.

The band resumed touring activities in April 2025 with a tour in the United Kingdom, their first in the country since 2018. In May 2026, Front Line Assembly embarked on a tour through Europe, playing sets from their WaxTrax! era. They were supported by American singer I Ya Toyah, German EBM band Tension Control, and British electronic band Portion Control on some dates.

== Musical style ==
The band has explored many music genres across their releases, including: Industrial, industrial rock, industrial metal, electronic body music and electro-industrial.

=== Development ===
Although being established as a largely industrial project, the band is known to take liberty in adapting their sound across many of their releases over the years. The band's early catalogue has been largely described as electronic body music, industrial and electro-industrial from Total Terror to Gashed Senses and Crossfire. Rhys Fulber has featured as a prominent collaborator with Leeb across many FLA releases, as both found they have a shared interest in electronic music. Fulber officially replaced longtime member Michael Balch on Caustic Grip, who was busy with other projects at the time. Fulber has since worked on and off with the band across several releases, he rejoined as a member in 2014.

Caustic Grip (1990) marked a shift to industrial rock on the single "Provision", featuring guitar work that would later be featured much more extensively on the next several albums; the opening track (Resist) also features guitar. Tactical Neural Implant released soon after in 1992 and marked a major change in the band's sound, exploring more melodic and electronic styles throughout the album. The album was the first to feature widespread use of multiple film and instrumental samples, another element to be expanded on later. The release is considered one of the band's very best by fans and critics alike.

Millennium (1994) then followed and became the band's first industrial metal record, containing several guitar samples from prominent metal bands such as Pantera ("Walk") alongside the session guitar work of Devin Townsend, who also appears on the follow-up Hard Wired (1995). The inclusion of guitars has since become common on recent FLA albums, such as Improvised Electronic Device (2010), though not a permanent change.

[FLA]vour of the Weak (1997) is similar to Tactical Neural Implant, though it has significant electronica and big beat influences and is possibly the band's most melodic and musically varied album in their entire catalogue. The album largely eschews previously used guitars and samples, featuring a more stripped-down sound. Flavour and the next two releases, Implode (1999) and Epitaph (2001), featured Chris Peterson as a collaborator (including future albums), and featured a strong influence of breakbeat and big beat, before the return of Fulber on Civilization (2004). Echogenetic (2013) saw the band incorporate dubstep into their music, which was popular at the time.

The band released a soundtrack album titled AirMech in 2012, followed by WarMech in 2018. The albums feature a continuation of the electronica style of the band's later material. The first is the eponymous soundtrack of the game and the latter is for the game's sequel, titled AirMech Wastelands.

=== Lyrics ===
Leeb described FLA lyrics to generally revolve around dystopian science fiction;

"I think most of the lyrics are basically about man versus technology. Basically, we're destroying our planet with technology. At the same time, technology is the only thing that can save us. It's this constant struggle between these two forces that is making us go in whatever direction we're all going."

He has acknowledged that this is largely influenced by his outlook on the world:

"I just feel like the more I know the less I wanna know and the more disappointed I get with things. To me, things keep getting worse than better.

== Members ==
=== Current members ===
- Bill Leeb – vocals, keyboards, percussion (1986–present)
- Rhys Fulber – keyboards, programming, percussion (1986, 1989–1996, 2002–2005, 2014–present)
- Joey Blush – keyboards, turntables (2024–present; live member)
- Eli van Vegas – drums (2024–present; live member)

=== Former members ===
- Michael Balch – keyboards, programming, percussion (1987–1990)
- Chris Peterson – keyboards, programming, percussion (1990–1992, 1996–2001, 2002, 2005–2009)
- Adrian White – drums, guitars (1995–1996, 2000–2006; live member)
- Jed Simon – guitars, percussion (1995–1999; live member)
- Jeremy Inkel – keyboards, programming, percussion (2005–2018; died 2018)
- Jared Slingerland – guitars, keyboards, programming, percussion (2005–2016)
- Jason Bazinet – drums (2010–2014; live member)
- Tim Skold – guitars (2022–2023; live member)
- Matthew Setzer – guitars (2023–2024; live member)
- Jon Siren – drums (2022–2024; live member)

== Discography ==
=== Studio albums ===
This listing only lists regular full-length studio albums.

- The Initial Command (1987)
- State of Mind (1988)
- Corrosion (1988)
- Gashed Senses & Crossfire (1989)
- Caustic Grip (1990)
- Tactical Neural Implant (1992)
- Millennium (1994)
- Hard Wired (1995)
- [FLA]vour of the Weak (1997)
- Implode (1999)
- Epitaph (2001)
- Civilization (2004)
- Artificial Soldier (2006)
- Improvised Electronic Device (2010)
- Echogenetic (2013)
- Wake Up the Coma (2019)
- Mechanical Soul (2021)

== Tours ==
- Gashed Senses & Crossfire tour (Europe and North America), 1989
- Caustic Grip tour (Europe and North America), 1991
- Tactical Neural Implant tour, 1992
- Hard Wired tour (World), 1995–1996
- Re-Wind tour, 1998
- Implosion tour (North America), 1999
- Artificial Soldier tour (Europe and North America), 2006
- Fallout tour (Europe and North America), 2007
- Improvised Electronic Device tour (Europe and North America), 2010–2011
- Echogenetic tour (Europe and North America), 2013–2014
- The Machinists United Tour, 2018 (with Die Krupps)
- Mechanical Soul tour, 2022
- North American Tour, 2024 (with Gary Numan)
- Return to the UK tour, UK, 2025 (with Tension Control, Dead Lights)
- Industrial Nation Tour, United States, 2025 (with Clock DVA, Lead into Gold, Nitzer Ebb, Mentallo and the Fixer)

== Side projects and associated acts ==
In the course of Front Line Assembly's history, current and former band members have engaged in a multitude of musical activities besides Front Line Assembly.

=== Active bands ===
- Conjure One is Rhys Fulber's project he started after leaving Front Line Assembly in 1997, venturing deeper into ambient and worldbeat. Fulber released the first album under this moniker in 2002 and has since hit the charts several times.
- Delerium started off as a side project in 1987. While Bill Leeb is the only constant member and band leader, collaborators include current and former Front Line Assembly personnel. The project is stylistically diverse ranging from trance, world music and ambient to electronic pop music, features a number of female guest singers and had several chart entries and number one hits.
- Fear Factory is an American industrial metal band with a long-standing working relationship with Fulber. He started off delivering remixes for Fear Factory at the beginning of the 1990s, eventually becoming their long-time producer, and was considered de facto member.
- Left Spine Down is a Canadian digital hardcore band co-founded by Jeremy Inkel. Jared Slingerland is a former member.
- Noise Unit is an industrial spin-off of Front Line Assembly launched in the late 1980s by Leeb and including Marc Verhaeghen from Belgian industrial band Klinik on their first two albums. Other Front Line Assembly members joined at different times, the project also saw a collaboration with German industrial band Haujobb.
- Cyberaktif is a collaboration between Bill Leeb and cEvin Key and Dwayne Goettel of Skinny Puppy in 1990 and 1991 which resulted in one album and two accompanying singles, released on Wax Trax!. The group reformed with Leeb, Key and Fulber in 2023.
- Unit 187 is a Canadian industrial metal band which Peterson wrote songs for in 2003 and later joined as full-time member.

=== Inactive or defunct bands ===
- Blackland was the main project of Michael Balch, launched in the first half of the 1990s after his departure from Front Line Assembly. Although having recorded a full-length album and an EP, Blackland never released officially through a label.
- Skinny Puppy was Leeb's first band.
- Decree is a noise dark ambient industrial metal band Chris Peterson co-founded in 1991. Their most recent album is the 2011 release "Fateless", and their website is no longer active.
- Equinox was a drum and bass-oriented side project of Leeb and Peterson that spawned an album and a single in 1998.
- Fauxliage is the name of the project and the album that Leeb and Fulber started and released in 2007 together with Sixpence None the Richer singer Leigh Nash whom they had worked with on past Delerium albums.
- Intermix was a side project of Leeb and Fulber in the 1990s that focused on techno and later on ambient.
- Mutual Mortuary was a collaboration between Leeb and Skinny Puppy's Nivek Ogre which resulted in two tracks released on compilations in 1986. Ogre was opposed to releasing any track of the project, claiming the tracks were unfinished.
- Pro>Tech was a solo effort of Leeb in 1997 which spawned only one album that bore similarities with Front Line Assembly's [FLA]vour of the Weak.
- Revelstoker was a drum 'n' bass side project of Chris Peterson that released only one track on a compilation of Vancouver-based label Xynthetic in 2007.
- Stiff Valentine is a Canadian metal band for which Jared Slingerland appeared as guest member. Their most recent release was the track "Coke Ah Cola" for the 2015 compilation Electronic Saviors Volume 3: Remission.
- Synæsthesia was an ambient side project of Leeb and Fulber in the 1990s.
- Will was an industrial venture of Peterson and Fulber together with vocalist John McRae.

== See also ==
- List of bands from British Columbia
- Music of Vancouver
