= Chris Peterson (producer) =

Canadian music producer (born 1968)

- Born: Christopher Garet Peterson; May 14, 1968 (age 58); London, Ontario, Canada
- Origin: Vancouver, British Columbia, Canada
- Genres: Electronica, electro-industrial
- Occupation: Music producer
- Instruments: Keyboards, synthesizer, sampler
- Years active: 1987–present
- Labels: Artoffact, Cleopatra, COP International, Decibel, Dependent, Dossier, Energy, Hypnotic, Irond, Metropolis, Minuswelt Musikfabrik, Nettwerk, Off Beat, Synthetic Symphony, Vendetta Music, Zoth Ommog

Chris Peterson (born May 14, 1968) is a Canadian producer and electronic musician from Vancouver. Throughout his career, he has worked with numerous bands in the Canadian industrial and electronic music scene of which Front Line Assembly and Delerium are the most notable. He is married to Kerry Peterson of Stiff Valentine.

== Music career ==
=== Current bands and projects ===
- Decree
- Öhm
- Stiff Valentine
- Unit 187

=== Former bands and projects ===
- Delerium
- Equinox
- Front Line Assembly (on the [FLA]vour of the Weak, Implode, Epitaph, Artificial Soldier and IED albums)
- Noise Unit
- Pro>Tech
- Revelstoker
- Will
