= Rhys Fulber =

Canadian producer and musician

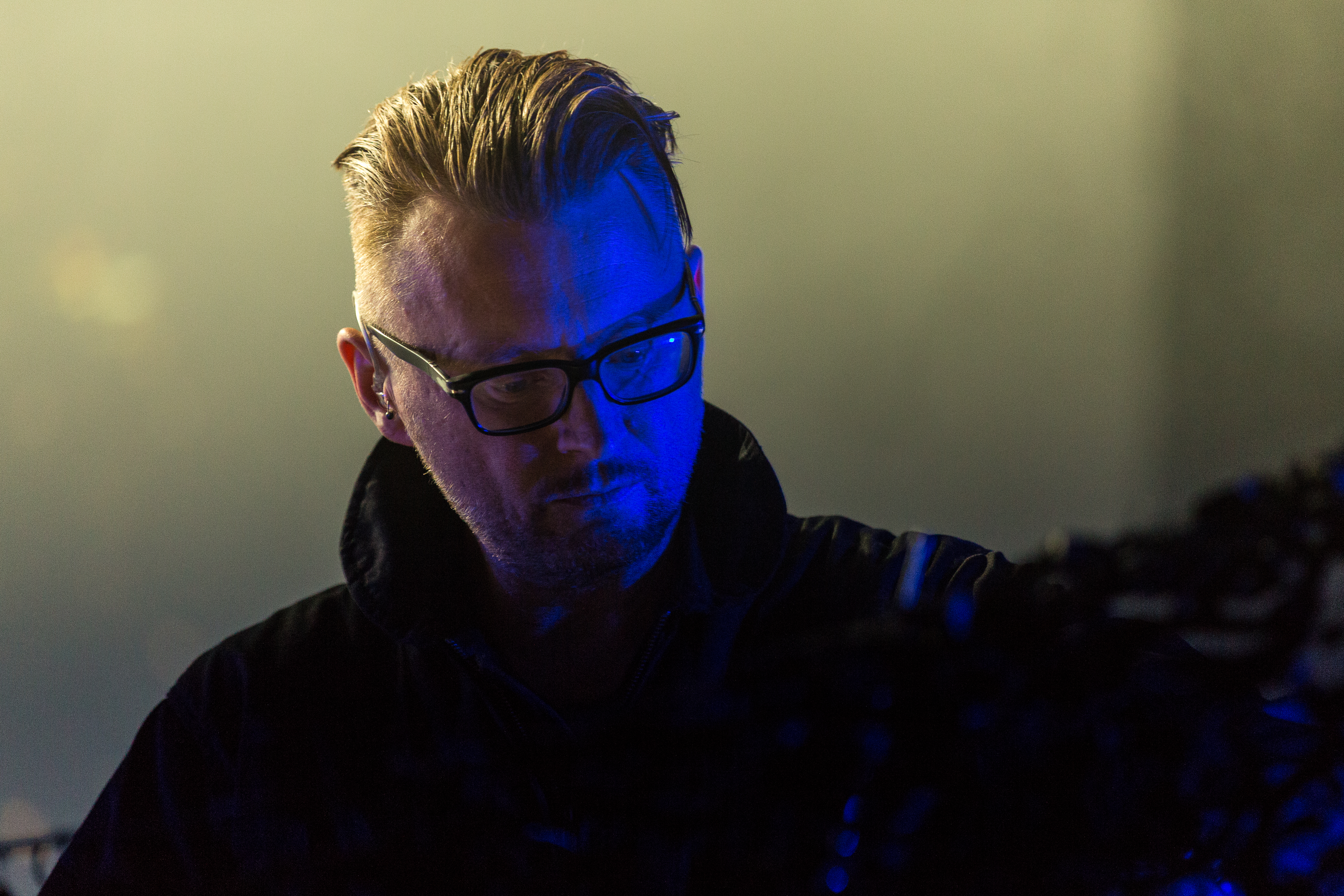
- Fulber with Front Line Assembly at Wave-Gotik-Treffen 2018

Background information
- Born: Nowell Rhys Fulber; October 10, 1970 (age 55); Vancouver, Canada
- Genres: Alternative metal (production), electronica, industrial rock, techno
- Occupations: Producer, musician
- Instruments: Keyboards, synthesizer, sampler, programming
- Years active: 1987–present

Nowell Rhys Fulber (born October 10, 1970) is a Canadian electronic musician and producer. He is a member of Front Line Assembly and Delerium, along with Bill Leeb. He also records under his own name and under the name Conjure One.

== Biography ==
Fulber was born in Vancouver, British Columbia on October 10, 1970. His father, a musician, was born in Germany and his mother was from Great Britain. His father introduced him to the music of Led Zeppelin and Kraftwerk; they both attended a Kraftwerk concert in 1975. Other key influences on Fulber included Orchestral Manoeuvres in the Dark (OMD), Jean-Michel Jarre, SPK, Massive Attack, Dead Can Dance, and Pete Shelley's Homosapien (1981). He has cited OMD as his favourite band in his youth.

His father later built and ran a recording studio, catering toward the local punk rock scene. As a youth, Fulber spent a lot of time at the studio. In 1984 he started becoming more interested in electronic music and acquired his first synthesizer.

In 1986, he became friends with Bill Leeb, who had just left his former band Skinny Puppy.

Fulber is a first cousin of Shawn Atleo (Ahousaht First Nation), a Canadian activist and politician, who was elected twice as national chief of the Assembly of First Nations, serving 2009 into 2014.

== Early music career ==
Fulber's first involvements in Front Line Assembly were one song on their second cassette release Total Terror, and then three songs on The Initial Command. He also contributed to Delerium's debut album, Faces, Forms & Illusions. During this time he started the band Will together with Chris Peterson, John McRae and Jeff Stoddard, which lasted from 1987 to 1992.

He joined Front Line Assembly for their first tour, Gashed Senses & Crossfire in 1989. He then joined Delerium full-time when Michael Balch left. Until 1997, Fulber was involved in all Front Line Assembly, Delerium and side projects with Bill Leeb, including the albums Tactical Neural Implant and Hard Wired from Front Line Assembly, and Semantic Spaces and Karma from Delerium.

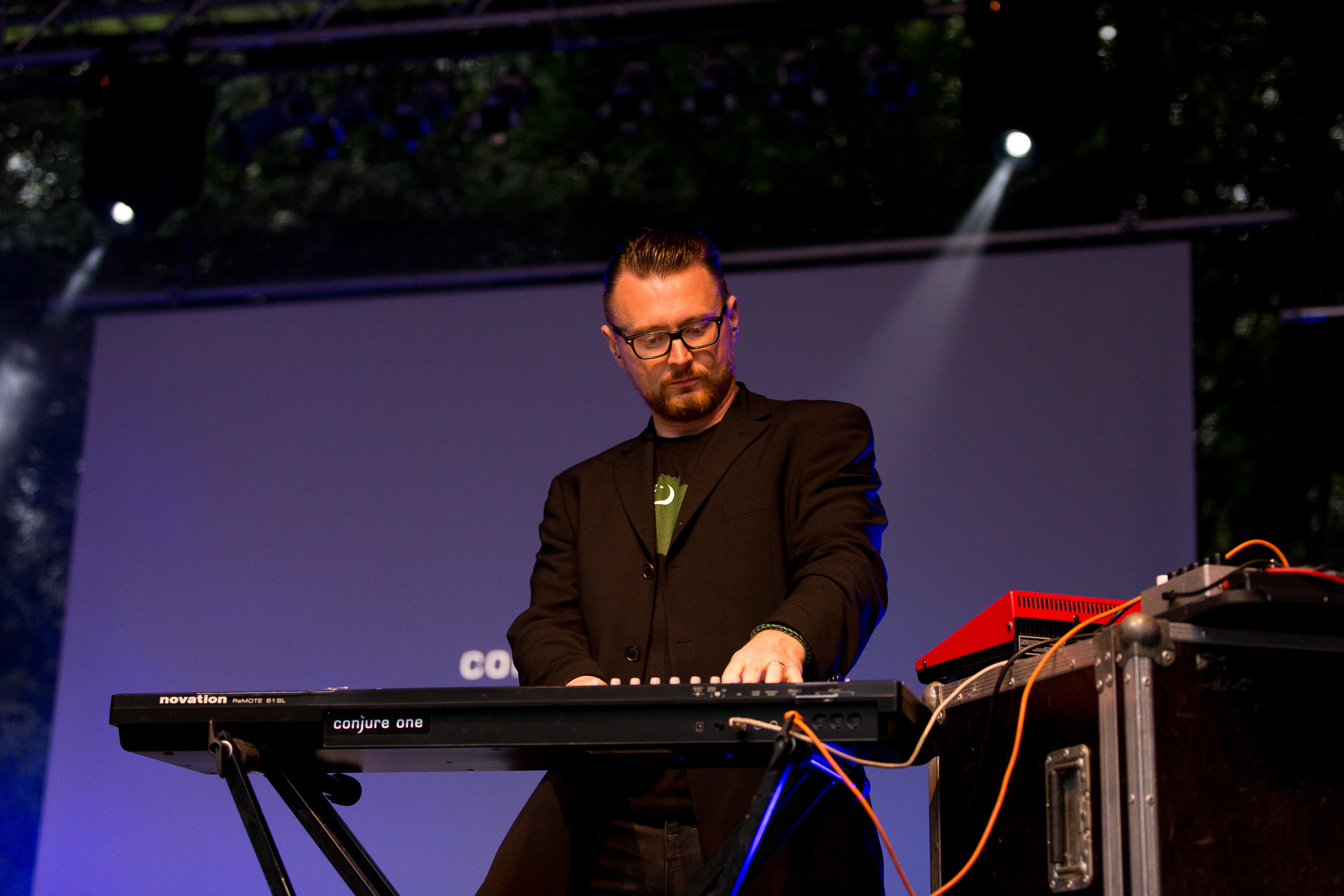
Rhys Fulber live with Conjure One at the Nocturnal Culture Night festival in Germany, 2015

Leeb and Fulber released several albums as Synæsthesia, including Embody, Desideratum and Ephemeral.

Fulber was nominated for the Jack Richardson Producer Of The Year award at the 2008 Juno Awards and won two Junos with Delerium for Best Dance Recording in 1998 and 2000.

== Discography ==
This section lists only regular full studio albums.

=== Techno released under his own name ===
- Your Dystopia, My Utopia (Sonic Groove, 2018)
- Ostalgia (Sonic Groove, 2019)
- Diaspora (aufnahme + wiedergabe, 2020)
- Resolve (FR Recordings, 2020)
- Brutal Nature (FR Recordings, 2021)
- Collapsing Empires (Sonic Groove, 2022)
- Balance Of Fear (Sonic Groove, 2024)
- Memory Impulse Autonomy (Artoffact, 2025)

=== Conjure One ===
- Conjure One (Nettwerk, 2002)
- Extraordinary Ways (Nettwerk, 2005)
- Exilarch (Nettwerk, 2010)
- Holoscenic (Armada Music, 2015)
- Innovation Zero (Black Hole Recordings, 2022)

=== Delerium ===
- Morpheus (Dossier, 1989)
- Syrophenikan (Dossier, 1990)
- Stone Tower (Dossier, 1991)
- Spiritual Archives (Dossier, 1991)
- Spheres (Dossier, 1994)
- Semantic Spaces (Nettwerk, 1994)
- Spheres II (Dossier, 1994)
- Karma (Nettwerk, 1997)
- Chimera (Nettwerk, 2003)
- Nuages du Monde (Nettwerk, 2006)
- Music Box Opera (Nettwerk, 2012)
- Mythologie (Metropolis, 2016)
- Signs (Metropolis, 2023)

=== Fauxliage ===
- Fauxliage (Nettwerk, 2007)

=== Front Line Assembly ===
- The Initial Command (Third Mind, 1987)
- Caustic Grip (Third Mind, 1990)
- Tactical Neural Implant (Third Mind, 1992)
- Millennium (Roadrunner, 1994)
- Hard Wired (Off Beat, 1995)
- Civilization (Metropolis, 2004)
- Artificial Soldier (Metropolis, 2006)
- Wake Up the Coma (Metropolis, 2019)
- Mechanical Soul (Metropolis, 2021)

=== Intermix ===
- Intermix (Third Mind, 1992)
- Phaze Two (Third Mind, 1992)
- Future Primitives (ESP-Sun, 1995)

=== Noise Unit ===
- Response Frequency (Antler-Subway, 1990)
- Strategy of Violence (Dossier, 1992)
- Decoder (Dossier, 1995)
- Drill (Off Beat, 1996)
- Deviator (Artoffact, 2021)

=== Synæsthesia ===
- Embody (Cleopatra, 1995)
- Desideratum (Hypnotic, 1995)
- Ephemeral (Hypnotic, 1997)

=== Will ===
- Pearl of Great Price (Third Mind, 1991)

== Production ==
As Front Line Assembly was beginning to peak, their UK label Third Mind was bought out by Roadrunner Records, a predominantly metal label. An up-and-coming band on the label Fear Factory was looking to expand their sound with remixes and new label mates Front Line Assembly were contacted. This led to the influential Fear Is the Mindkiller EP. From this more metal themed work followed while Fulber was contracted to contribute keyboards and de facto additional production to Fear Factory's breakthrough Demanufacture album, defining their signature sound.

Fulber had also contributed backing tracks around this same time to new Canadian industrial rock band Econoline Crush, leading to their signing with EMI Canada and eventually his first full length production job handling their debut album Affliction, spawning minor Canadian rock radio hit "Wicked". From there his production career grew and became more varied. The later success of Delerium bringing him into more adult music formats with artists like Josh Groban and Serena Ryder. Based out of Los Angeles since 2000, he currently works out of his own studio, Surplus Sound in Van Nuys.

=== Selected production credits ===
==== For musicians ====
- 1993: Fear Factory - Fear Is the Mindkiller (remixing)
- 1994: Mötley Crüe - Quaternary (programming on "Father")
- 1994: Econoline Crush - Purge (programming, keyboards)
- 1995: Fear Factory - Demanufacture (programming, keyboards, mixing, co-writing)
- 1995: Machine Head - Old (remixing)
- 1995: Econoline Crush - Affliction (production, keyboards, programming)
- 1995: Nailbomb - Proud to Commit Commercial Suicide (keyboards, programming)
- 1996: Front Line Assembly and Die Krupps - The Remix Wars: Strike 2 (remixing)
- 1996: The Tea Party - Alhambra (remixing)
- 1997: Fear Factory - Remanufacture - Cloning Technology (remixing)
- 1997: Waltari - Space Avenue (producing, programming)
- 1998: Skinny Puppy - Remix Dystemper (remixing)
- 1998: Fear Factory - Obsolete (producing, programming, keyboards, co writing)
- 1998: Cubanate - Interference (producing, programming, keyboards)
- 1999: Megadeth - Insomnia (Remix) (remix, programming)
- 1999:P.O.D. - Rock the Party (remix) (remixing)
- 2000: Factory 81 - Mankind (remixing)
- 2001: P.O.D. - Youth of the Nation (Conjure One remix) (remixing)
- 2001: Mudvayne - Dig (Remix) (remixing)
- 2001: The Watchmen - Slomotion (producing, programming, keyboards)
- 2001: Josh Groban - Josh Groban (producing, programming)
- 2001: Fear Factory - Digimortal (producing, programming, keyboards, co writing)
- 2002: Paradise Lost - Symbol of Life (producing, programming, keyboards)
- 2004: Collide - Vortex (remixing)
- 2004: L'Âme Immortelle - Gezeiten (producing, programming, keyboards)
- 2004: Fear Factory - Archetype (programming, keyboards, co writing)
- 2005: Paradise Lost - Paradise Lost (producing, programming, keyboards)
- 2006: Serena Ryder - If Your Memory Serves you Well (producing, programming, keyboards)
- 2007: Paradise Lost - In Requiem (producing, keyboards)
- 2007: Rob Thomas - Little Wonders (programming)
- 2008: Kreesha Turner - Don't Call Me Baby (Kreesha Turner song) (programming)
- 2009: Divine Heresy - Bringer of Plagues (keyboards)
- 2009: Brandi Disterheft - Second Side (producing, programming, keyboards)
- 2010: Ryan Star - 11:59 (programming) lead track "Brand New Day" theme of TV series Lie To Me
- 2010: Fear Factory - Mechanize (producing, programming, keyboards, co writing)
- 2010: Rob Zombie - Mars Needs Women (remix, programming ("Sick Bubblegum and Jesus Frankenstein'))
- 2012: Fear Factory - The Industrialist (producing, programming, keyboards, engineering, co writing)
- 2013: Mindless Self Indulgence - How I Learned to Stop Giving a Shit and Love Mindless Self Indulgence (mixing, additional production, engineering, co writing)
- 2013: Scar the Martyr - Scar the Martyr (producing, keyboards, programming)
- 2014: Machine Head - Bloodstone & Diamonds (string arrangements, keyboards, percussion)
- 2015: Fear Factory - Genexus (producing, programming, keyboards, engineering)
- 2016: Youth Code - Commitment to Complications (producing, mixing, engineering, additional programming, additional keyboards)
- 2018: Machine Head - Catharsis (programming, string arrangements)
- 2018: Three Days Grace - Outsider (keyboards, programming)
- 2025: Propaganda - Nocebo (remixing)

==== For other media ====
- 2000: Gun Shy (additional score)
- 2002: Coors Light - "Rock On"
- 2006: Justice (theme programming)
- 2020: Cyberpunk 2077 (two tracks for gameplay)
