= Greg Reely =

Canadian record producer

Greg Reely is a Canadian record producer, engineer, and mixer who has worked with acts such as Sarah McLachlan, Front Line Assembly, Fear Factory, Machine Head, Coldplay, The Tea Party, Spirit of the West and others.

== Credits ==
- BAG – BAG, I Can't Shut My Mouth
- Bleeding Through – Declaration
- Boxcar – Vertigo
- Coldplay – Live at the Commodore
- D-Metal Stars – Metal Disney
- Delerium – Nuages du Monde, Chimera, Aria, Poem, Karma, Delerium, Flowers Become Screens, Semantic Spaces
- DevilDriver – DevilDriver, Fury of Our Maker's Hand
- Devin Townsend – Infinity
- Disney – Disney's Superstar Hits, Walt Disney Records Presents Superstar Hits
- Dog's Eye View – Daisy
- Equinox – Contact
- Fear Factory – Demanufacture, Obsolete, Archetype, Mechanize, Remanufacture – Cloning Technology, Re-Industrialized, Fear Is the Mindkiller, Cars, Zero Signal, Demolition Racer
- Front Line Assembly – Artificial Soldier, Civilization, "Maniacal", Epitaph, Implode, "Comatose", FLARemix, Live Wired, "Plasticity", "Circuitry", Hard Wired, Millennium, "Surface Patterns", Tactical Neural Implant, "The Blade", "Virus", Caustic Grip, "Iceolate", "Improvised. Electronic. Device", "AirMech", "Echogenetic"
- Impellitteri – Pedal to the Metal
- Impellitteri – Wicked Maiden
- Impellitteri – Venom
- Machine Head – Old, Death Church
- Mnemic – Mechanical Spin Phenomena
- Nothnegal – 'Decadence'
- Overkill – The Electric Age, White Devil Armory
- Paradise Lost – Paradise Lost, Symbol of Life
- Rose Chronicles – Dead and Gone to Heaven
- Sarah McLachlan – When She Loved Me, Intimate & Interactive, Dear God, Good Enough, I Will Remember You, Possession, Solace, Steaming, Touch, Vox, Closer: The Best of Sarah McLachlan, Surfacing
- Strapping Young Lad – Heavy as a Really Heavy Thing, Alien, For Those Aboot to Rock: Live at the Commodore
- Skinny Puppy – Doomsday: Back and Forth Series 5: Live in Dresden, Worlock, Too Dark Park, Tormentor, Addiction, Shore Lined Poison
- Tara MacLean – Silence
- The Devin Townsend Band – Synchestra
- The Tea Party – Alhambra, Sister Awake
- Theatre of Tragedy – Storm
- Threat Signal – Vigilance

== Soundtracks ==
- Resident Evil: Apocalypse
- Lara Croft: Tomb Raider
- Alone in the Dark
- Mortal Kombat
- Freddy Got Fingered
- Get Carter
- Galerians: Rion
- Hideaway
- The Rage: Carrie 2
