= WestCom =

German recording company

WestCom (full name: WestCom Neue Medien Tonträger- Produktions- und Vertriebs GmbH) was a German recording company that operated the label Off Beat, Visage Records and others.

== Company history ==
Founded around 1993.

In addition to WestCom, its owner also operates NovaTekk and Euromedia. Headquartered in Gelsenkirchen, Germany.

In 1999 Stefan Herwig, A&R manager at Off Beat, left the company over differences in promotion, to join forces with Eskil Simonsson (Covenant), Johan Van Roy (Suicide Commando), Bryan Erickson (Velvet Acid Christ) and Ronan Harris (VNV Nation) to form a new label, dependent (which opened January 1999). When he left, most artists switched to the new label, effectively shutting down WestCom.

== Labels ==
=== Off Beat ===

Off Beat was a label specialized in electronic music with industrial and experimental rhythmic features which was founded in 1993 by Stefan Herwig and Thorsten Stroht.

After having signed German electronic music group Project Pitchfork as first band to the label, Off Beat took a number of unsigned bands such as Haujobb, Download and Decree under its wing. Also, at the time already well established groups such as Front Line Assembly, Skinny Puppy and Suicide Commando joined the label.

Off Beat established license partnerships with American labels 21st Circuitry, Metropolis, Electric Death Trip and Re-Constriction as well as with Swedish label Memento Materia that added Mentallo and the Fixer, Velvet Acid Christ and Covenant among others to the roster.

Originally the catalog numbering followed the codes issued by its distributor SPV GmbH (like SPV 085-22292 for Front Line Assembly's 1995 album Hard Wired). Around 1996 the label started its own format, starting with a capital O followed by the release number. Previous releases were attributed numbers, that were added to the artwork in reprints.

=== Visage Records ===
Visage was a label/division specialized in synthpop.

Aside from several European synthpop bands as Elegant Machinery and The Northern Territories, it was responsible for the Vis-à-Vis series of compilation albums.

=== Poison Ivy ===
Poison Ivy was a label/division specialized in goth rock. It started 1998 with the release of the album One Day by the band Near Dark.

=== Nightshade ===
Nightshade Productions was a specialized label and division dedicated to dark wave music prominently featuring artists such as Sara Noxx.
