= Industrialnation =

US underground music magazine

- Industrialnation, issue #6
- Editor: Paul Valerio
- Categories: Music, Culture
- Frequency: Irregular
- Circulation: 15,000 (as of issue 20)
- Publisher: Paul Valerio
- Founded: 1991
- First issue: January 1991
- Final issue: 2005
- Company: Self-published
- Country: United States
- Language: English
- Website: http://www.industrialnation.com
- ISSN: 1062-449X
- OCLC: 25623835

Industrialnation was an independent international underground music magazine based in Oakland, California. The magazine was founded in Iowa City, Iowa in 1991 by Paul Valerio.

== History ==
Issue #1 was released as a half-sized black and white xerox fanzine with a press run of 100 copies. It quickly grew in size and depth to document the underground electronic music industry and culture. In 1995 the magazine's home base relocated to Chicago. Industrialnation upgraded to a full-size format (8.5"×11") with full-color glossy cover and newsprint interior. After publishing issue #16 in 1998, the editorial staff took a hiatus from publishing. In 2003 Industrialnation reappeared in the San Francisco Bay Area and laid roots in Oakland. For the five issues published thereafter, the print quality of the magazine was improved, adding glossy and color pages inside.

In the 1990s, no other periodical dedicated to industrial music culture had the circulation and influence of Industrialnation. The magazine was an important channel of communication in the subculture—particularly within America. Since 2010 it has been cited repeatedly in Assimilate: A Critical History of Industrial Music and been referenced as historically significant in liner notes by Prurient. Scholar Michael du Plessis notes that the magazine was an early voice in transhumanism. The publication is included in special collections at academic libraries that include Michigan State University and Bowling Green State University.

Industrialnation on occasion would also publish a compilation album on CD to be included with a given issue. They released music—often exclusive—by Kevorkian Death Cycle, Electric Hellfire Club, Collide, Rapoon, H3llb3nt, Mors Syphilitica, Babyland, and many others.
