= Third Mind Records =

British independent record label

- Founded: 1983
- Founder: Gary Levermore
- Defunct: 1994
- Distributors: Rough Trade, Play It Again Sam
- Genre: Electronic music, industrial, post-punk, new wave
- Country of origin: United Kingdom
- Location: Whitstable, Kent

Third Mind Records was a British independent record label, founded in February 1983 by Gary Levermore.

== Name ==
The label derived its name from the book The Third Mind, a work compiled by Beat Generation author William S. Burroughs and artist Brion Gysin using the cut-up technique.

== History ==
Third Mind originated from the group and fanzine Tone Death that Levermore had founded in the middle of 1982 together with two friends. During that time, Levermore started contacting bands he had discovered through diverse media and at concerts, which would finally be featured in Tone Death. While writing the editorial for the second issue of the fanzine, to be released around February 1983, Levermore "began considering the possibility of releasing a cassette containing contributions by some of the groups that had been featured in the two issues to date." His considerations led to the double cassette release Rising From The Red Sand Vols. I & II, which was followed by volumes III and IV in 1983. The compilations featured a number of post-punk, electronic, and industrial bands, some of which would be later on the label's roster, and sped up Levermore's "transition from zine enthusiast into label owner."

The Rising From The Red Sand series was met with stronger demands than Levermore had anticipated. Sending promo copies to some shops and getting a five-star review in Sounds magazine led to a great number of order requests. The London-based shop of Rough Trade ordered a substantial number of copies. "Those compilations sold quite well", remembered Levermore, "and more or less provided the fund base to actually put out three or four albums."

After this initial success Third Mind developed slowly, with an annual quantity of seven or eight records in the first years. Levermore had to deal with tight budgets, the label's artists recorded "for very, very low sums of money." Signing Canadian industrial band Front Line Assembly and British singer-songwriter Bill Pritchard in 1987 meant a major step forward for the label making them the label's flagships in different markets and entailing also further post-Third Mind management duties.

All of the label's releases until after Front Line Assembly's 1990 album Caustic Grip were licensed to American independent label Wax Trax.

Third Mind started off with Rough Trade as distributor which changed between 1987 and 1988 when the label switched to Play It Again Sam. Due to "policy differences" Third Mind and Play It Again Sam terminated their partnership and in 1992 Levermore moved on to partner with American metal label Roadrunner Records. In 1991, Roadrunner had already bought a 50 per cent stake of Third Mind which gave Levermore a greater financial leeway since Roadrunner paid Levermore "a salary for three years to continue running the label while they financed new releases." Before Roadrunner, Levermore said, "there's been many occasions over the years when I've seen a band that I wanted to work with go somewhere else and have a bit of success."

Levermore and Roadrunner ended their collaboration in April 1994. When Third Mind ended its business activities in the same year, it had released more than 100 titles. The rights to all releases passed over to Roadrunner.

=== Fourth Dimension Records ===
In 1983 Levermore started Fourth Dimension Records as an offshoot of Third Mind. After two releases, he handed over business to Richard Johnson from the British fanzine Grim Humour. The second release was born out of collaboration between Levermore and Johnson as a flexi disc for Grim Humour. Johnson had already thought about starting a label by himself, and "when Gary told me he wouldn’t be operating FD after this second release, it just made sense for me to continue with the name."

== Artists ==
- Airpeople
- Area
- Attrition
- Beautiful Pea Green Boat
- Bill Pritchard
- Bushido (Levermore's band)
- Chris Carter
- Code
- Controlled Bleeding
- Courage of Lassie
- Cultural Amnesia
- Delerium
- Eden
- Ed Tomney
- Edward Ka-Spel
- Faction
- The Flash Faction
- Front Line Assembly
- God Said
- Harry Fabvre
- Heavenly Bodies
- Intermix
- In the Nursery
- Intimate Obsessions
- Konstruktivits
- Metamorphosis
- Nurse with Wound
- Portion Control
- Prayer Tower
- Sirius B
- Solar Enemy
- The Legendary Pink Dots
- The Moon Seven Times
- Will

== See also ==
- List of record labels
