= Jeremy Inkel =

Canadian electronic musician (1983–2018)

Jeremy Michel Neville Inkel
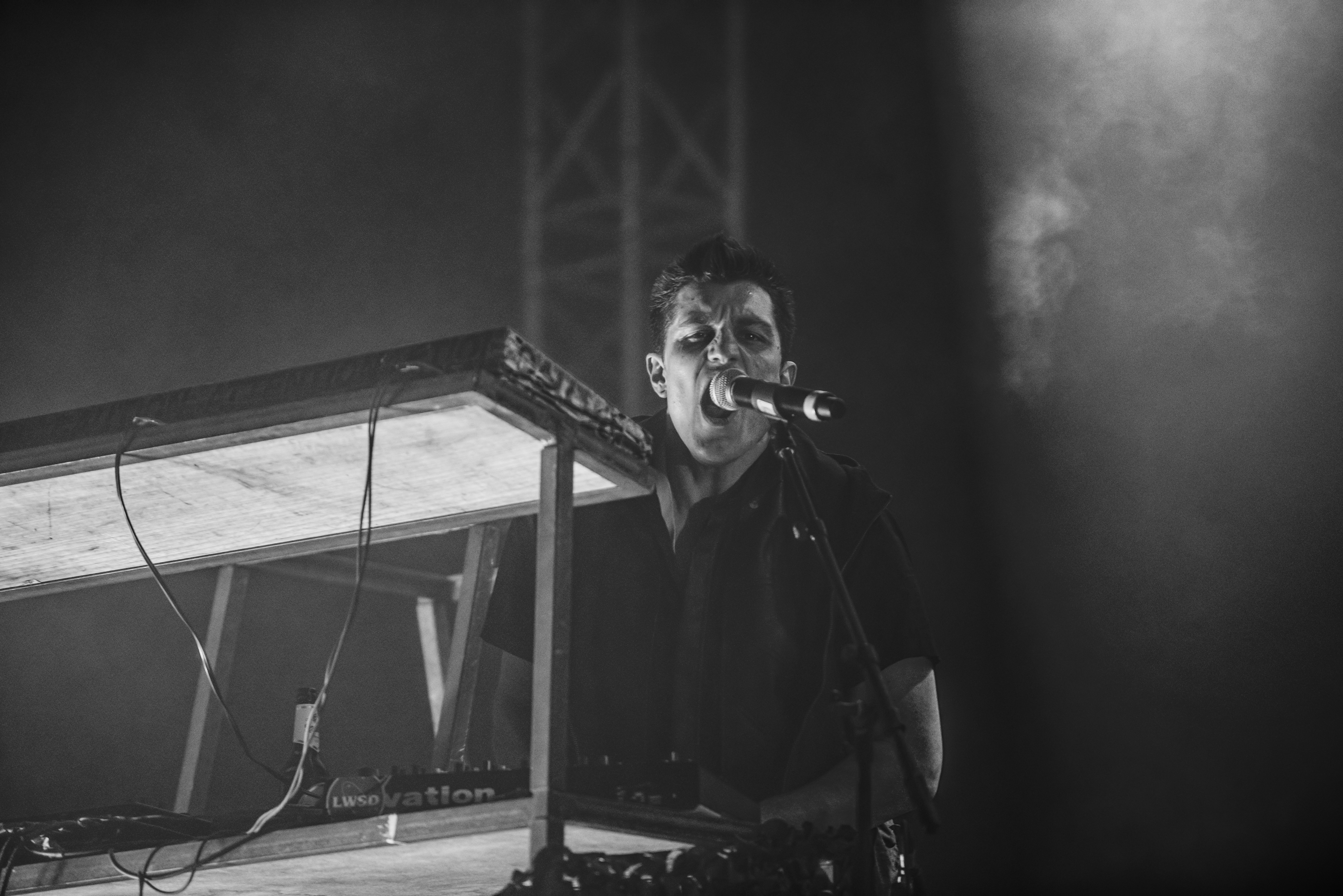
- Inkel live at E-Tropolis Festival, 2016

Background information
- Born: February 8, 1983; Montreal, Quebec, Canada
- Died: January 11, 2018 (aged 34) North Vancouver, British Columbia, Canada
- Genres: Electro-industrial; industrial rock
- Occupation: Musician
- Instruments: Synthesizer; keyboards; Percussion
- Years active: 2003–2018
- Labels: Metropolis Records; Synthetic Symphony; Dependent Records; Artoffact Records; Synthetic Entertainment

Jeremy Michel Neville Inkel (February 8, 1983 – January 11, 2018) was a Canadian electronic musician based in Vancouver. He was best known as a keyboard player and programmer for Left Spine Down and electro-industrial band Front Line Assembly as well as producing tracks for various well known musicians worldwide. He began his work with Left spine Down in 2003 when he replaced original member Frank Valoczy. He was invited into Front Line Assembly in 2005 and made his first contributions to their 2006 album Artificial Soldier. He also made contributions to Front Line Assembly side projects Noise Unit and Delerium. Inkel died from complications with asthma at the age of 34 on January 11, 2018.

== Career ==
By 2003, Inkel co-founded Left Spine Down with kAINE D3L4Y and Matt Girvan. Their like-mindedness for punk rock and electronic music brought them together, performing as headliners as well as openers for touring acts in Vancouver. After beginning work on LSD's first album, Fighting for Voltage with Chris Peterson, Inkel was welcomed into Front Line Assembly in 2005. He co-wrote and -produced the full-length album Artificial Soldier (released in 2006). FLA then brought Inkel (as well as LSD alumni Jared Slingerland) on tour to promote the Artificial Soldier album. They quickly followed up with the remix album Fallout, touring worldwide for two years with the group, and co-headlining various festivals such as Mera Luna, Summer Darkness, and Amphi Festival (featuring notable acts such as Nitzer Ebb, Bauhaus, Apoptygma Berzerk, Bloc Party, VNV Nation, The Killers and others).

He was also in the lineup for FLA to play in Russia for the first time. It was during these tours with FLA that Inkel was able to introduce the world to his other band, Left Spine Down, via the means of their Smartbomb EP released on the Synthetic Sounds label.

2008 and 2009 saw Inkel and Left Spine Down open for acts such as The Genitorturers, ohGr, The Birthday Massacre, and the Revolting Cocks' North American Lubricatour (with Jim Rose, Blownload and Left Spine Down as guests). It was then when Inkel began working with 16volt's Eric Powell, providing his services on their new album American Porn Songs ("To Hell") and coordinating LSD's appearance on the North American MIDI GHETTO TOUR, which consisted of thirty-three performances with 16volt and Chemlab in Spring of 2010.

In 2009, Inkel returned to Front Line Assembly, co-writing and co-producing the full-length album Improvised Electronic Device, and the single "Shifting Through the Lens". The albums were released in 2010. As a result of Inkel's experience touring with The Revolting Cocks, he enlisted Al Jourgensen to co-produce, mix, and perform vocals for the track "Stupidity", alongside Justin Hagberg, guitarist and vocalist for 3 Inches of Blood.

Inkel died in North Vancouver on January 11, 2018, aged 34, following complications from asthma.

== Discography ==
=== Solo Work ===
- 2020 Hijacker (released posthumously)

=== Noise Unit ===
- 2005 Voyeur
- 2022 Cheeba City Blues (Posthumous)

=== Front Line Assembly ===
- 2006: Artificial Soldier
- 2007: Fallout
- 2010: Improvised Electronic Device
- 2012: AirMech
- 2013: Echogenetic
- 2014: Echoes
- 2018: WarMech
- 2019: Wake Up the Coma

=== Left Spine Down ===
- 2003 Click EP
- 2007 Smartbomb EP
- 2008 Fighting for Voltage
- 2009 Voltage 2.3: Remixed and Revisited
- 2009 Smartbomb 2.3: The Underground Mixes
- 2011 Caution

=== Delerium ===
- 2012: Music Box Opera

== See also ==
- Left Spine Down
- Front Line Assembly
- Noise Unit
- Synthetic Entertainment
