= Improvised Electronic Device =

Studio album by Front Line Assembly
- Released: June 22, 2010
- Genres: Electro-industrial, industrial metal, industrial rock
- Length: 60:15; 74:05 (Deluxe Edition)
- Labels: Metropolis, Dependent
- Producers: Bill Leeb, Chris Peterson, Jeremy Inkel, Jared Slingerland

Front Line Assembly chronology
Fallout (2007)	Improvised Electronic Device (2010)	AirMech (2012)

Singles from Improvised Electronic Device
- 1. "Shifting Through the Lens" Released: May 28, 2010; 2. "Angriff [Remix]" Released: September 30, 2010

Improvised Electronic Device is the fourteenth full-length studio album by Vancouver industrial band Front Line Assembly, released in 2010.

== Writing and production ==
According to band leader Bill Leeb, there was no theme from which the album took form. "Everyone just started doing stuff", he said in an interview with Auxiliary Magazine, emphasizing how the band was influenced by their surroundings, "I don't know if it's just the times we live in or the stuff going on around us. Whether you read the internet or watch the news or whether you just talk to people. It just seems like it ended up being a theme of predominance, world issues." Leeb cited travelling with the band as important inspiration, mentioning trips to Russia as example: "Front Line has always liked iconic symbolism and going to countries like that really inspired me lyrically." "It seemed like wherever we looked there was something for us to get into. We didn't have to make up any stories or create anything that wasn't already in front of us.", he concluded. Similarly, the album title arose from the band's perception of the outside world. Guitarist Jared Slingerland said in a conversation with The Rumpus, "I mean, I.E.D., it's obvious what it is, but because it's still kind of a sensitive issue, Bill came up with the idea of 'electronic device.' There's obviously some overlap there."

In interviews, Bill Leeb went into more detail of some songs. "Afterlife" reflects Leeb's relationship with his father and themes like mortality. To Release Magazine he talked about the song's background: "When we moved to Canada, I didn't have any contact with my dad. It took me twenty years to hunt him down, and on the last tour of Europe we finally hooked up. He said he wanted to come to Canada, which I thought was cool. After two days, I found out he had leukemia. It took me twenty years to find him, and then he died after seven weeks." For Leeb, the lyrics also constituted a new approach. "The song is very personal. I usually write about more general stuff [...], so it's the first time I wrote such personal lyrics, and I wasn't sure if Front Line was the right place for it, but I figured what the hell, it's my band." The song "Angriff" was inspired by the band's visits in Russia and "is peculiar in that the chorus is performed in German", as noted music magazine Side-Line. Leeb attributed this choice to his Austrian origin: "Actually, since I was born and raised in Vienna, Austria, German was always my first language, it only seemed natural to eventually reclaim my heritage and do a song in my mother tongue."

Leeb described Improvised Electronic Device as "the most difficult album to put together", which also "took almost three years to make, the longest out of any Front Line album ever." The band wrote songs for about six months in the first year and then decided to abstain from writing for some time. "We'd never done that before, [...] see if you still liked the record.", explained Leeb. Writing being on hiatus, Leeb tried to bring in former member Rhys Fulber, which led to confusion with the other band members. "It created chaos with the rest of the guys", remembered Leeb, "We tried to get Rhys but he was too busy [...], and it wasn't fair to the other guys". Finally, the band resumed writing and "by the time Rhys was available we felt like the album was done and there really wasn't any room for anyone to put anything else on it."

The album saw some change of personnel. While it turned out to be the last Front Line Assembly album to feature Chris Peterson, live guitarist Jared Slingerland became permanent member and was fully involved in writing. With Greg Reely and Ken Marshall sharing mixing responsibilities it was "the first time we used two engineers/producers", said Leeb and added, "Ken brought a lot of his own ideas into the mixing aspect." Another contributor was Justin Hagberg of Canadian heavy metal band 3 Inches of Blood who not only played guitar on three tracks but also co-wrote the tracks "Release" and "Stupidity". Al Jourgensen contributed to the latter as well. Contact to Jourgensen came about through Jeremy Inkel, who had toured with his other band Left Spine Down as a supporting act for Jourgensen's side project Revolting Cocks. He had "ended up becoming friends with Al and his wife", said Leeb, "So he asked if Al wanted to do anything, but Al only wanted to do it if he heard it first. So we sent a track to him, and he liked it. [...] He did the vocals, as well as produced it in his studio in Chicago." The track is also a tribute to Wax Trax, whose co-founder Dannie Flesher died in 2010.

"We have a revolving door with Front Line, people sort of come and go, I never say never on anything", said Leeb about the involvement of so many contributors, and added: "It's fun to get other people involved." "We had two camps", explained Leeb the band's modus operandi during production of Improvised Electronic Device in an interview with Bloody Disgusting: "Jared and Chris have a studio set up and Jeremy has one too, and I would float around between both, and song ideas would get started, and I always thought I'd have the last say, and I'd come in and come up with the choruses and change things and so forth." While Leeb focused "more on song writing and lyrics", the other band members and contributors added to what became "a pretty big stack of electronic components that helped create this." Leeb mentioned "our analogs, the mini-Moogs, the Pro 1s and all this stuff" as examples, as well as "virtual programs and synths and effects" and the studio gear of Reely and Marshall. On the other hand, Slingerland emerged as a songwriter: "He took his guitar and ran it through effect synths and came up with a few really cool chords."

== Touring ==
An initially planned North American tour after the release was cancelled. Band leader Bill Leeb commented on this, saying "We have had too many problems putting the tour together, and the bottom line is, if we can't put on a good show for you the fans, then it's just not worth it." Nevertheless, Front Line Assembly headed out to tour Europe in support of Improvised Electronic Device in fall 2010. The band continued touring from May to June 2011 in North America and returned to Europe from August to September 2011.

The line-up for all the tours consisted of all official band members except for Chris Peterson for whose absence Leeb, in a 2010 interview with Release Magazine, cited further commitments as the reason. The band completed the line-up with live drummer Jason Bazinet.

On the 2010 club tour in Europe, the band was supported by the Austrian electronic music band mind.in.a.box. Some two weeks before the tour started Front Line Assembly released a tour trailer on the YouTube channel of their German label Dependent presenting "some insight on the live show and a few back stage talking".

Originally, the German industrial band Die Krupps were supposed to join Front Line Assembly on the North American leg of the 2011 tour, but failed to do so "due to immigration/visa issues". Supporting acts for the whole of the North American leg were American electronic music band DJ? Acucrack and – with the exception of the show at Kinetik Festival – American industrial rock band Cyanotic. Former band member Rhys Fulber's project Conjure One joined the stage for four dates while American electronic music band Dismantled joined for the remainder of the tour by the end of May. VIP passes were offered to be purchased in advance that entitled their holders to attend certain activities like soundcheck and meet and greet with the band as well as receive exclusive tour items. Also, the band sold the "Angriff" single as physical CD single otherwise in the United States only available as digital download.

Supporting act for the European leg of the 2011 tour was German electronic music band Digital Factor.

== Release ==
Improvised Electronic Device was first released in the United States on June 22, 2010 through Metropolis. The European version, released on June 25, 2010 via Dependent, differs in that it features the fifth track "Shifting Through the Lens" as edit. The album was issued in two different formats: The physical CD includes ten tracks while the digital download release was offered as regular ten track version as well as deluxe edition containing two bonus tracks. In 2014, Canadian label Artoffact Records re-released Improvised Electronic Device as double vinyl in different variations.

=== Singles ===
Improvised Electronic Device spawned two singles. The first, "Shifting Through the Lens", was released a few weeks before the album. The title track comes in an extended version and as digital download-only edit. The single also includes the track "Angriff" and the non-album instrumental "Endless Void".

"Angriff [Remix]" is the second single from the album. It was released on the occasion of Front Line Assembly's tour in Europe together with mind.in.a.box in September and October 2010, due to "Angriff" having "developed [in]to a club hit." Originally, the single was announced to be available only at live shows. Angriff contains a radio edit and several remixes of the title track, of which four are works by Mindless Faith, Skold, mind.in.a.box, and Project Pitchfork. The track "Attack the Masses", although credited as unreleased, had already been released as a bonus track for the deluxe edition of Improvised Electronic Device, while "Freakuency" was a previously unreleased track.

== Critical reception ==
Professional ratings
Review scores
Source	Rating
AllMusic	3/5 stars
Alternation	5/5 stars
Bloody Disgusting	4.5/5 stars
Brutal Resonance	7/10
FEARnet	Favorable
Future Music	6/10
KWWL	4.5/5 stars
PopMatters	6/10
Seattle Post-Intelligencer	Favorable
Soundsphere	3/5 stars
Sputnikmusic	3.5/5 stars

Improvised Electronic Device garnered some very good reviews, but overall critical reception was only cautiously positive.

In light of the band's career spanning decades, critics reflected about how the sound and style of Improvised Electronic Device compare to past releases. Mike Schiller of PopMatters emphasized the band's "consistency of sound": "It sounds so much like Front Line Assembly, in fact, that it would have fit right in on just about any Front Line Assembly album since 1994's Millennium." Referring to tracks that borrow elements from songs of earlier releases, Schiller stated, "there is nothing here that hasn't been done before." — With the exception of the opening track "I.E.D.", as Schiller expressed his surprise: "The first ever Front Line Assembly song with five beats in every measure."

Trey Spencer of Sputnikmusic looked very critically at the musical output between Hard Wired and Artificial Soldier. These releases he called "disappointing results", and deemed the band to be "back on track" with Artificial Soldier, seeing Improvised Electronic Device in the vein of its predecessor: "Bill Leeb was able to retain his focus and deliver an album that mixes the modern EBM sound of Artificial Soldier with the solid industrial metal of Hard Wired." "It seems that he has finally figured out how to make all of those divergent elements come together and work seamlessly", wrote Spencer, recognizing the musical influences of past albums. He concluded: "Improvised Electronic Device is the first album since Hard Wired in 1996 that could truly be considered a great Front Line Assembly release, and we can only hope that this is the beginning of a new trend."

Against the background of different musical influences, Patrik Lindström of Brutal Resonance found the album to be "a very varied experience." About the band members he said: "I sometimes get the feeling that they are not exactly working together like a team." At the expense of the album's coherence, as Lindström pointed out: "If you are looking for singularity and musical unity, this album is not for you." In contrast, Mike Schiller of PopMatters considered Improvised Electronic Device to be "Front Line Assembly's 'band' album, on which it sounds as though Leeb, programmers Chris Peterson and Jeremy Inkel, and guitarist Jared Slingerland all have significant input into the final sound," and the "layers complement each other but never get in the way of the songs".

Gregory Burkart of FEARnet came to similar conclusions. "Improvised Electronic Device seems possessed of multiple personalities", he wrote, "but for that same reason it serves as a great introduction to this band's wildly diverse output, which has touched on just about every aspect and subgenre of electronic music over the past quarter-century."

== Track listing ==
All lyrics are written by Bill Leeb; all music is composed by Front Line Assembly, except where noted.

No.	Title	Length
1.	"I.E.D."	6:34
2.	"Angriff"	6:43
3.	"Hostage"	6:57
4.	"Release" (Music by Front Line Assembly, Justin Hagberg)	5:20
5.	"Shifting Through the Lens (Extended Version)"	6:06
6.	"Laws of Deception"	5:20
7.	"Pressure Wave"	4:57
8.	"Afterlife"	5:57
9.	"Stupidity" (Music by Front Line Assembly, Justin Hagberg, feat. Al Jourgensen)	4:15
10.	"Downfall" (Instrumental)	8:06

Deluxe edition additional tracks
No.	Title	Length
11.	"Day of Violence"	8:27
12.	"Attack the Masses"	5:23

== Personnel ==
=== Front Line Assembly ===
- Bill Leeb – vocals, lyrics, synthesizer
- Chris Peterson – programming, synthesizer, additional engineering
- Jeremy Inkel – programming, synthesizer, additional engineering
- Jared Slingerland – guitar, programming, keyboard

=== Additional musicians ===
- Al Jourgensen – production (9), vocals (9), lyrics (9), string arrangements (9), additional programming (9), mixing (9)
- Samton D'Ambruoso – additional drum programming (9), vocal engineering (9), mixing (9)
- Craig Joseph Huxtable – additional keyboard (5)
- Justin Hagberg – guitar (4, 8, 9)

=== Technical personnel ===
- Dave McKean – design, illustration
- Greg Reely – mixing (3, 5, 8, 10), additional production (3, 5, 8, 10), engineering, mastering
- Chris DeMarcus – additional engineering (8)
- Ken Marshall – mixing (1, 2, 4, 6, 7), additional production (1, 2, 4, 6, 7)

== Chart positions ==
=== Album ===
Chart (2010)	Peak position
US Top Dance/Electronic Albums (Billboard)	23
