= Echogenetic =

Studio album by Front Line Assembly
- Released: July 9, 2013
- Genre: Electro-industrial, EBM, dubstep
- Length: 58:26
- Label: Metropolis, Dependent
- Producer: Bill Leeb, Jeremy Inkel, Jared Slingerland, Craig Johnsen, Sasha Keevill

Front Line Assembly chronology
AirMech (2012)	Echogenetic (2013)	Echoes (2014)

Echogenetic is the fifteenth full-length studio album by Vancouver industrial band Front Line Assembly, released on July 9, 2013. It was well received both by critics and fans and charted in German and US charts. Critics commented on the band's return to a purely electronic approach and on the dubstep influence on the album. Front Line Assembly toured extensively in Europe and North America in support of this album and remix follow-up Echoes, which included a tour with vocalist and band leader Bill Leeb's former band Skinny Puppy. This was the last studio album to feature Jeremy Inkel before his death in 2018.

== Writing and production ==
Bill Leeb called predecessor album AirMech a "really cool warm-up" for the production of Echogenetic and added: "We just thought we should just continue on and evolve and keep that going for the new Front Line record."

Leeb also commented on the fact that the writing process in the band changed with the growing number of writers. "In the really early days it was just me and Rhys and then me and Chris", Leeb said, comparing the situation with the current composer line-up: "This time there were five of us: Jeremy [Inkel] and his friend Sasha [Keevill] were in one camp, and then Jared [Slingerland] and his right hand guy Craig [Johnsen] were in the other camp." The process involved Leeb "jumping between two studios" and the group getting together "every two or three weeks and critique everything, go over things" and "add new elements to each others' work." Leeb expressed his relief that more shoulders than in past line-ups shared the workload.

For the first time in their history the band set a deadline for an album to be completed. The band broke new ground for themselves with their style of songwriting. "With the new stuff, there's a process called ducking and chaining", explained Leeb, "it's focusing more on the actual sound and timing of it." According to Leeb, "it's what makes it sound different and interesting." In contrast to the experimental nature of the writing process, Leeb called the abandoning of guitars "really my only conscious effort this time." The reason for this decision was to "just go back to what influenced me when I started Front Line."

Advancements in computer technology influenced the songwriting as well. Leeb stated that the use of virtual synthesizers and other software simplified composing, and since the band need not enter a recording studio, made production more affordable. This affected the working routine with long-time engineer and mixer Greg Reely: "With this new record, [...] when we have songs we'd send them to Greg, he would mix and send them back and we'd spend a week listening and be 'well, we like this' and 'we want to change that'." Leeb emphasized the role Reely played in producing Echogenetic, saying, "when you work with him for over 25 years it just like with every good relationship, it just evolves." Thus Leeb considered Reely's work "a big bonus for us."

== Release and promotion ==
Front Line Assembly revealed the album title on their official Twitter account on February 23, 2013, writing the title's letters in reverse order. First announcements of the release date stated Echogenetic was to be released early August or July 2013. In the wake of these announcements the band made further details of Echogenetic available. In April 2013 the cover and the track list were revealed. Metropolis published an excerpt of track "Prototype" as preview in June and followed up with full versions of tracks "Killing Grounds" and "Ghosts" shortly after. One day before release, Revolver magazine released the complete album as SoundCloud stream.

Echogenetic was released in various formats. Metropolis issued the album on CD and as digital download. Dependent offered a broader range of formats. The CD version was released as limited edition digipak and in regular jewel case while the vinyl version came with two LPs in gatefold and a download code. The vinyl edition was also offered as part of a fan bundle that included a worker shirt. A fan edition that included the CD and an exclusive band T-shirt was available in Germany.

With the release the band announced a remix album.

=== Touring ===
Front Line Assembly supported Echogenetic and remix follow-up Echoes with extensive touring.

The first tour in support of Echogenetic took place in Europe in August 2013 and covered dates in the Czech Republic, Germany, Hungary, the Netherlands, Russia, and the United Kingdom. Supporting acts where German Industrial band Haujobb and – with the exception of two dates in Russia and Germany respectively – Metropolis label mates iVardensphere. The show in Moscow on August 9, 2013 at P!PL Club was sold out.

Originally confirmed to headline the dates of Australian festival Fiend Fest in April 2014, the band was forced to cancel their appearance due to health issues of Bill Leeb. Front Line Assembly's planned performance at the Kinetik Festival in Toronto in May 2014 also did not happen since the festival was cancelled altogether. However, after having already announced some dates in March 2014, the band returned to Europe in June 2014 to further promote Echogenetic and Echoes with a tour that covered club shows and festival dates in Slovakia, the Czech Republic, Germany, Sweden, Finland and France. They were supported by German electronic musician Daniel Myer's project Architect. At the Malmö show Swedish industrial band Rave The Reqviem joined the stage as additional support act. Shortly before the tour, Front Line Assembly announced there were plans in the making for additional shows in the United Kingdom in October. More detailed plans for a continuation of the tour activities in fall 2014 revealed that there would be no UK dates but only mainland Europe shows. The band held promoters responsible for not being able to play in the UK as announced, commenting "Please understand that we can't pay to play. Blame the UK Promoters not the band." In September Front Line Assembly announced that former member Rhys Fulber would join the band as live member for the tour in fall and that the tour would include a show together with an orchestra in Leipzig. The second part of the European tour ultimately comprised eight dates in Germany and Poland. The performance at the Gewandhaus in Leipzig was part of the 2014 run of the Gothic Meets Klassik Festival and was supported by philharmonic orchestra Zielona Gora.

Shortly after Front Line Assembly had concluded their tour activities in Europe in fall 2014 the band announced they would join Skinny Puppy's Eye vs Spy tour in North America in November and December 2014. The idea of touring together had already been brought up by Bill Leeb in the past. After the withdrawal of electronic music band VNV Nation who were originally on the bill Front Line Assembly were able to step in at short notice. The tour schedule spanned shows in 17 locations in the United States and in Canada and included German industrial group Haujobb as well as American industrial band Youth Code as supporting bands. Former long-time member Rhys Fulber performed together with Front Line Assembly on several dates. At the show in Vancouver Leeb entered the stage of Skinny Puppy to perform their song Assimilate as encore.

== Critical reception ==
Professional ratings
Review scores
Source	Rating
Barcode	9/10
Brutal Resonance	9.5/10
Chain D.L.K.	4.5/5 stars
FEARnet	Favorable
Intravenous	Favorable
Louder Than War	Favorable
Pop Blerd	Grade: A
ReGen	4.0/5 stars
Release	8/10
Sputnikmusic	4.0/5 stars

Echogenetic received mostly favorable reviews. Jeremy Atkins of Brutal Resonance wrote, "This ambitious release is a must have for fans of FLA." Raul Stanciu of Sputnik Music called Echogenetic the "updated, more atmospheric counterpart to Tactical Neural Implant." Several critics noted the Dubstep influences on Echogenetic. Gregory Burkart of FEARnet said, "It also marks a return to the band's earlier all-synth phase, losing the industrial-metal riffage that had become an integral part of their sound over the past several albums through 2010's Improvised Electronic Device." Barcode Magazine praised the songwriting: "[T]he music is gripped by a thirst for grisly robotics, fused with formidable dubstep bass vibes, monster cyberiffs, cavernous effects and sublimely programmed beats that combine to infuse the songs with a tangible sense of power and intensity."

As opposed to the band's earlier output, guitars were absent from Echogenetic. Intravenous Magazine commented on this, saying "Instead the band assimilate the sound into their arsenal so effectively that it fits quite comfortable and even manages to mask the pronounced lack of guitars on the album."

Readers of Revolver voted Echogenetic Album of the Week for the week after its release. User ratings on Sputnikmusic pushed the release to fourth place of the Best Industrial Albums of 2013 ranking. PopMatters picked the album for its The Best Electronic Music of 2013 list where it ranks in 15th place. In the corresponding short review Darryl G. Wright called Echogenetic "an extremely rich album" and its song material "as pleasing to the ears as it is the heart".

== Track listing ==
No.	Title	Writer(s)	Length
1.	"Resonance"	Bill Leeb, Jared Slingerland, Craig Johnsen, Jeremy Inkel	2:46
2.	"Leveled"	Leeb, Slingerland, Johnsen	5:17
3.	"Killing Grounds"	Leeb, Inkel, Sasha Keevill	5:58
4.	"Blood"	Leeb, Slingerland, Johnsen	5:25
5.	"Deadened"	Leeb, Inkel, Keevill	5:48
6.	"Ghosts"	Leeb, Inkel, Slingerland, Johnsen	4:43
7.	"Echogenetic"	Leeb, Slingerland, Johnsen	4:35
8.	"Exhale"	Leeb, Slingerland, Johnsen, Inkel	5:27
9.	"Exo"	Leeb, Inkel, Keevill	7:09
10.	"Prototype"	Leeb, Inkel, Slingerland, Johnsen (Additional sounds by Sasha Keevill)	5:36
11.	"Heartquake"	Leeb, Slingerland, Johnsen, Inkel (Additional sounds by Sasha Keevill)	5:42

== Personnel ==
=== Front Line Assembly ===
- Bill Leeb – vocals, electronic instruments
- Jeremy Inkel – electronic instruments
- Jared Slingerland – electronic instruments, guitars

=== Additional musicians ===
- Craig Johnsen – electronic instruments
- Sasha Keevill – electronic instruments

=== Technical personnel ===
- Greg Reely – mixing, mastering
- Troy James Sobotka – album art direction, design
- Dave McKean – Front Line Assembly logo design
- Roy Salmond – assistant vocals recording

== Chart positions ==
It is the first time the band entered the official German albums chart Media Control Charts.

Chart (2013)	Peak position
German Albums (Offizielle Top 100)	75
German Alternative Albums (Deutsche Alternative Charts)	1
US Top Dance Albums (Billboard)	19
US Heatseekers Albums (Billboard)	19
