= Echoes (Front Line Assembly album) =

Remix album by Front Line Assembly
- Released: May 13, 2014
- Genre: EBM; electro-industrial; dubstep
- Length: 76:27
- Label: Metropolis

Front Line Assembly chronology
Echogenetic (2013)	Echoes (2014)	Kampfbereit (2015)

Echoes is a remix album by Industrial band Front Line Assembly. It was released on May 13, 2014 through Metropolis.

== Release and promotion ==
At the same time they released Echogenetic (2013), Front Line Assembly announced plans to follow up with a remix album. The names of the first few remixers were revealed in July 2013. A poll on Facebook where the band asked their fans who should deliver a remix received more than 300 responses. A more comprehensive and confirmed list of remixers followed in December 2013.

The release date of Echoes was disclosed in February 2014, followed by the track list. In April, snippets of the album were available at Metropolis. Other online music platforms provided longer snippets shortly before actual release in May.

Metropolis issued Echoes as regular physical CD edition with 14 tracks and in a deluxe version. The deluxe edition contains four bonus remixes and was released as digital download and on Artoffact Records as double vinyl edition.

== Critical reception ==
Professional ratings
Review scores
Source	Rating
Barcode	6.8/10
Brutal Resonance	8/10
Head Full of Noise	4/5 stars
I Die : You Die	Favorable
Intravenous	Favorable
MetalMouth	7.5/10
Reflections of Darkness	6/10
ReGen	4/5 stars
Release	8/10
Side-Line	9/10

Echoes was well received by critics. Despite his scepticism towards remix albums, Michael Davis of Head Full of Noise praised Front Line Assembly's continuing "level of craftsmanship" heard on preceding album Echogenetic as well as on Echoes. The band managed to avoid the pitfalls of remix albums, wrote Davis, thus delivering "the solid Front Line Assembly quality we all know." Johan Carlsson of Release Magazine called Echoes "a great idea too, because 'Echogenetic' saw the band move further into modern dance floor styles, and the songs lend themselves well for remixes." He considered the list of remixers "pretty stellar" and said about their work, "It seems like all remixers have brought their A-game to 'Echoes', and all bring a fresh, interesting perspective to each song." Similarly, Sean M. Palfrey of Intravenous Magazine wrote that Echoes is "a collection of great re-workings of the originals that don't simply resort to trying to create more dance friendly versions of what were already dance friendly songs." "'Echoes' sounds as pure lust for the ears", judged Side-Line.

The two new songs on the release also caught the attention of critics. "The brand new tracks 'Contagion' and 'Next War'", wrote Alex of I Die : You Die, "suggest a more song-oriented ends for Front Line's current style of production, a hint reinforced by the carefully arranged Hijacker mix of 'Exo' by FLA’s own Jeremy Inkel and collaborator Sasha Keevill, two of the architects of Echogenetic‘s distinctive sound." Release Magazine's Carlsson also noted that the new tracks follow "the modern, upbeat, electronic style found on 'Echogenetic'."

== Track listing ==
No.	Title	Length
1.	"Contagion" (Lyrics by Ian Pickering, music by Bill Leeb, Jared Slingerland, Craig Johnsen, Jeremy Inkel and Sasha Keevill)	5:19
2.	"Leveled (Sonic Mayhem Remix)"	7:36
3.	"Ghosts (Comaduster Remix)"	4:59
4.	"Killing Grounds (Rhys Fulber Remix)"	6:06
5.	"Echogenetic (Youth Code Remix)"	3:33
6.	"Deadened (Liebknecht Remix)"	4:48
7.	"Next War" (Lyrics by Pickering, music by Leeb, Slingerland, Johnsen, Inkel and Keevill)	6:05
8.	"Echogenetic (Blush Response Remix)"	4:28
9.	"Exhale (Henrik Backstrom Remix)"	4:56
10.	"Prototype (HECQ Remix)"	7:31
11.	"Leveled (Slighter Remix)"	6:06
12.	"Heartquake (Techdiff Remix)"	4:40
13.	"Blood (Haujobb Remix)"	5:05
14.	"Exo (Hijacker Remix)"	5:15

Deluxe edition bonus tracks
No.	Title	Length
15.	"Ghosts (Tweaker Remix)"	5:55
16.	"Ghosts (Primitive Race Remix)"	5:06
17.	"Killing Grounds (Greg Reely Remix)"	7:17
18.	"Heartquake (Cyanotic Remix)"	4:56

== Personnel ==
=== Front Line Assembly ===
- Bill Leeb – vocals, electronic instruments
- Jeremy Inkel – electronic instruments
- Jared Slingerland – electronic instruments

=== Additional musicians ===
- Craig Johnsen – electronic instruments
- Sasha Keevill – electronic instruments
- Ian Pickering – backing vocals (1)

=== Technical personnel ===
- Greg Reely – mastering, mixing (1, 7, 14)
- Troy James Sobotka – album art direction, design
- Dave McKean – Front Line Assembly logo design
- Gabriele Gaba Scalici – vocals recording (1)
