= WarMech =

2018 soundtrack

Soundtrack album by Front Line Assembly
- Released: June 22, 2018
- Genres: Electro-industrial; dubstep; video game music; EDM
- Length: 73:21
- Label: Artoffact Records
- Producers: Bill Leeb; Jared Slingerland; Sasha Keevil; Craig Johnson; Jeremy Inkel

Front Line Assembly chronology
Kampfbereit (2015)	WarMech (2018)	Wake Up the Coma (2019)

Professional ratings
Review scores
Source	Rating
I Die: You Die	Favorable
Overdrive	Favorable
Reflections of Darkness	8.5/10
ReGen	Favorable
Release	7/10
Side-Line	7.5/10
Spectrum Culture	3.5/5 stars
The Spill Magazine	4/5 stars

WarMech is a video game soundtrack album by Vancouver-based electro-industrial band Front Line Assembly. The album was released through Artoffact Records on June 22, 2018 as the soundtrack to Carbon Games' AirMech Wastelands, a sequel to the 2012 video game AirMech that also featured a soundtrack by Front Line Assembly. WarMech features some of Jeremy Inkel's final recordings, as he died on January 11, 2018 (additional programming by Inkel eventually appeared on the band's follow-up album in 2019, Wake Up the Coma).

== Background and production ==
Already having been a fan of Bill Leeb's various projects, Carbon Games founder James Green had approached the band for WarMech and its predecessor album AirMech because "I wanted to work with Bill/FLA for our games [for] the same reason I love the music as a fan. It's more of a signature Bill Leeb thing in fact, as you can hear it across all his music projects - the complex layering and build up of songs. [...] Having something with the depth and texture you find in FLA songs is exactly what I wanted."

During the production period of some fifteen months Carbon Games gave the band complete artistic freedom, a process both parties described as easy-going. Carbon Games as well as Front Line Assembly considered the album a big improvement over the already well-received AirMech.

While Leeb saw AirMech as a learning experience, he emphasized the importance of the extensive dubstep programming "with different types of dubstepping" for WarMech: "In some of the songs they are the real key elements. It's more intense in that way, we just pushed it to another level."

== Release ==
The songs "Mechvirus" and "Molotov" were released for early streaming through the group's Bandcamp account.

The original intention of Carbon Games was to issue a physical release of the album themselves. Talks with label Artoffact about the vinyl edition lead to Artoffact assuming responsibilities also for the CD issue.

== Track listing ==
All tracks are written by Bill Leeb, Jeremy Inkel, Jared Slingerland, Sasha Keevil, Craig Johnsen.

No.	Title	Length
1.	"Mechvirus"	6:33
2.	"Anthropod"	5:45
3.	"Heatmap"	6:21
4.	"The Imminent"	4:54
5.	"Force Carrier"	5:17
6.	"Meteorfall"	6:49
7.	"Molotov"	5:30
8.	"Rip Sensor"	7:31
9.	"The Eminent"	6:11
10.	"Mechanism"	6:07
11.	"Earthriser"	5:48
12.	"Creator"	6:35

== Personnel ==
Credits adapted from WarMech liner notes.

=== Front Line Assembly ===
- Bill Leeb – vocals, electronic instruments, production
- Jared Slingerland – electronic instruments, production
- Jeremy Inkel – strings recording, electronic instruments, production
- Sasha Keevil – electronic instruments, production
- Craig Johnson – electronic instruments, production

=== Additional musicians ===
- Jason Bazinet – additional samples

=== Technical personnel ===
- Dave McKean – album art

== Chart history ==
Chart (2018)	Peak position
German Alternative Albums (Deutsche Alternative Charts)	3
