= Fallout (Front Line Assembly album) =

Remix album by Front Line Assembly
- Released: April 24, 2007
- Recorded: 2007
- Genre: Industrial, electro-industrial
- Length: 70:23
- Label: Metropolis
- Producer: Bill Leeb, Rhys Fulber, Chris Peterson

Front Line Assembly chronology
| Artificial Soldier (2006) | Fallout (2007) | Improvised Electronic Device (2010) |

Fallout is a remix album by Vancouver industrial band Front Line Assembly, released in 2007. Initially announced as an EP, it is a collection of nine remixes by both the band themselves and other artists as well as three previously unreleased tracks.

== Release ==
According to Jeremy Inkel, "Electric Dreams" and "Unconscious" are songs that were originally meant for the Artificial Soldier album, but left unfinished until after. Band leader Bill Leeb later expressed his dissatisfaction with the release, saying, "We weren't that happy with Fallout even though it was more of a friendship remix CD."

In 2016, Canadian label Artoffact reissued the album on vinyl.

== Touring ==
After having postponed the tour because of the later than planned release of the album the band toured North America and Europe in support of Fallout. The North American leg comprised dates in April and May 2007. The band were accompanied by American industrial rock band Acumen Nation as supporting act until May 8, American new wave band and Metropolis label mates TheStart joined on 2 May 2007 for the remainder of the tour. Front Line Assembly continued their tour in Europe in June and July 2007 where British industrial band Portion Control acted as support.

== Critical reception ==
Professional ratings
Review scores
| Source | Rating |
|---|---|
| AllMusic | 3/5 stars |
| Alternation | 4/5 stars |
| Chain D.L.K. | 4/5 stars |
| ReGen | 3.5/5 stars |
| Release | 4/10 |
| Rock Sound | 7/10 |

David Jeffries of Allmusic called Fallout "one of the better odds and ends collections in FLA's catalog." Remarking on individual songs, he stated, "Sebastian R. Komor (Icon of Coil) makes "Unleashed" sound absolutely epic", and called Portion Control's "Lowlife" remix both "creepy and sinister" and the "most difficult and rewarding remix".

In his review, Peter Marks of Release Magazine said of the album, "The results are mixed", calling the "Unleashed" remix "not very impressive". He was positive about the Portion Control "Lowlife" remix, saying it "goes places FLA never would, or for that matter could." About the mix of "Lowlife" retitled "Reprobate", he said that "production master Greg Reely gives his version... a potent, malicious bent". On the new tracks Marks commented, "The three new works are all nice enough but it is "Armageddon" that sticks in my mind as it takes us back to a different era of this act, when they were releasing truly revelatory works."

== Track listing ==
| No. | Title | Length |
|---|---|---|
| 1. | "Unleashed" ("Mindless Mix" by Sebastian R. Komor) | 6:16 |
| 2. | "Buried Alive" (DJ(?) Acucrack Mix by Jason Novak) | 6:14 |
| 3. | "Beneath the Rubble" (Combichrist Remix) | 6:15 |
| 4. | "Electric Dreams" | 4:39 |
| 5. | "Armageddon" | 6:01 |
| 6. | "Social Enemy" ("Anti-Social Mix" Remix by Jeremy Inkel) | 7:00 |
| 7. | "Lowlife" (Remix by Portion Control) | 4:17 |
| 8. | "Humanity" ("Kearley Edit" Remix by Dan Kearley) | 7:05 |
| 9. | "Reprobate" (Lowlife) (Remixed by Greg Reely) | 5:48 |
| 10. | "Domination" (Unleashed) (Rhys Fulber Remix) | 4:33 |
| 11. | "The Storm" (Covenant Remix) | 7:04 |
| 12. | "Unconscious" | 5:10 |

== Personnel ==
=== Front Line Assembly ===
- Bill Leeb – production (4, 5, 10), vocals, additional synthesizer (5)
- Rhys Fulber – production (4, 10, 12), programming (4, 9, 10, 12)
- Jeremy Inkel – production (5, 12), programming (5, 6, 12)
- Chris Peterson – additional programming (5, 12)
- Jared Slingerland – live guitar (5)

=== Additional musicians ===
- Eskil Simonsson – vocals (11)
- Adrian White – live drums (5)

=== Technical personnel ===
- Chris Demarcus – drum engineering (5)
- Greg Reely – mixing
- Brian Gardner – mastering
- Dave McKean – design, illustration
