= AirMech (soundtrack) =

Music from the video game AirMech

Soundtrack album by Front Line Assembly
- Released: November 13, 2012
- Genres: Electronica, electro-industrial, dubstep, industrial dance, video game music
- Length: 72:23
- Labels: Metropolis, Dependent
- Producers: Bill Leeb, Jeremy Inkel, Jared Slingerland

Front Line Assembly chronology
Improvised Electronic Device (2010)	AirMech (2012)	Echogenetic (2013)

AirMech is a video game soundtrack album by Vancouver industrial band Front Line Assembly. The album was released by Carbon Games in 2012 as the soundtrack for free-to-play real-time strategy game AirMech.

== Release ==
AirMech was released as a limited edition CD album and digital download. Each item of the CD version contained a code which granted access to exclusive game content and design. Canadian label Artoffact Records re-released AirMech in 2014 as a double vinyl in different variations.

== Background ==
The album was announced in September 2012. Carbon Games' Game Director James Green said, "The first thing I thought of was trying to get music that sounded like Front Line Assembly". The band agreed, on the condition that members could be included in the game with "crazy sonic weapons". During the production process the band wrote "a wide range of tracks that would be suitable for AirMech, from menus to ingame music."

== Critical reception ==
Professional ratings
Review scores
Source	Rating
Barcode	7.5/10
Brutal Resonance	9/10
Chain D.L.K.	4.5/5 stars
COMA	Favorable
FEARnet	Favorable
Reflections of Darkness	9.5/10
ReGen	3.0/5 stars
Side-Line	9/10

AirMech received mainly positive reviews. However, some critics thought AirMech is bound too much by the limitations of a video game soundtrack.

Gregory Burkart of FEARnet wrote, "AirMech is a definite keeper for FLA fans and anyone who grooves on dark, violent and cinematic-scale industrial & EBM". He felt that AirMech "follows through in some ways from the band's previous earth-shaking album 'Improvised Electronic Device'", but also brought some innovations: "The real departure on AirMech is the introduction of orchestral elements, something the band only incorporated only loosely in the past, and then in a more experimental way."

Jaymie Burzette of Coma Magazine emphasized how AirMech contrasts with other Front Line Assembly releases, saying, "AirMech is very different from normal Front Line Assembly fare. Instead of their usual Electro-Industrial sound, this album contains all instrumental tracks and bears a heavy Dubstep influence."

Trubie Turner of ReGen Magazine was more critical of the fact that AirMech is a video game score, pointing out, "Fans of Front Line Assembly are sure to find AirMech to be an odd experience". Turner called the album "an impressive showcase of Front Line Assembly's talent". However, "it can still feel overly repetitive and too heavily focused on loop ready riffs at times", Turner wrote and concluded, "Outside of the context of the game though, this purely instrumental work impresses but does not captivate."

Barcode Magazine, otherwise generally favorable of AirMech, found it to be "a downside [...] that AirMech had to be written to correspond to a particular soundtrack-style, which somewhat restricts the album from becoming what it could have been."

== Track listing ==
All tracks are written by Bill Leeb, Jeremy Inkel, Jared Slingerland.

No.	Title	Length
1.	"Airmech"	4:01
2.	"Arise"	5:24
3.	"Pulse Charge"	6:01
4.	"Prep for Combat"	7:22
5.	"System Anomaly"	5:03
6.	"Mech Killer"	7:08
7.	"Everything That Was Before"	6:57
8.	"Lose"	6:20
9.	"Burning Skyline"	6:27
10.	"Stealth Mech"	4:21
11.	"Death Level"	6:42
12.	"Prime Empiricism"	6:52
Total length:		1:12:23

== Personnel ==
=== Front Line Assembly ===
- Bill Leeb – vocals, electronic instruments
- Jared Slingerland – electronic instruments
- Jeremy Inkel – strings recording, electronic instruments

=== Additional musicians ===
- Craig Johnsen – additional programming (1, 2, 5, 7–9, 11, 12), song writing (1, 2, 5, 7–9, 11, 12)
- Sasha Keevill – additional programming (3, 4), song writing (3, 4)
- Meghan Engle – live strings (1, 7, 11)
- Nigel Befus – live strings (1, 7, 11)

=== Technical personnel ===
- Greg Reely – mixing, mastering
- James Green – album artwork
- Weng Chen – album artwork

== WarMech ==
In January 2015, Front Line Assembly announced that they started working on a follow-up album to AirMech. The album, titled WarMech, was released June 22, 2018.
