= Mechviruses =

Remix album by Front Line Assembly
- Released: February 7, 2025
- Genre: Electro-industrial
- Length: 47:29
- Label: Artoffact

Front Line Assembly chronology
Mechanical Soul (2021)	Mechviruses (2025)

Professional ratings
Review scores
Source	Rating
Atmostfear Entertainment	Favorable
I Die: You Die	Favorable
KrautNick	Mixed
Peek-A-Boo	75/100

Mechviruses is a remix album by Vancouver electro-industrial band Front Line Assembly. It was released on February 7, 2025, on CD, vinyl, and digitally through Artoffact and contains remixes of songs from the band's 2018 soundtrack album WarMech, mostly by Artoffact artists. It was Artoffact who had approached the band with the idea to remix WarMech with vocals of artists from the label's roster.

== Track listing ==
No.	Title	Length
1.	"Mechvirus" (featuring ULTRA SUNN)	4:35
2.	"Mechvirus" (featuring Ayria & Sebastian Komor)	5:46
3.	"Force Carrier" (featuring Bootblacks)	3:21
4.	"Molotov" (featuring Seeming)	4:07
5.	"Anthropod" (featuring Deep Infirmary)	6:24
6.	"Heatmap" (featuring MVTANT)	3:28
7.	"(RE)CREATOR" (featuring Fotocrime)	3:41
8.	"Heatmap" (featuring Cardinal Noire)	6:26
9.	"Molotov" (featuring Encephalon)	5:33
10.	"Molotov" (featuring s:cage, Famine, & Lys Morke)	4:08

CD edition additional tracks
No.	Title	Length
11.	"Mechvirus (Original)" (featuring Ayria)	6:33
12.	"Mechvirus (Instrumental Remix)" (featuring ULTRA SUNN)	5:54
Total length:		59:56

== Personnel ==
=== Technical personnel ===
- Dave McKean – original album artwork design
- Stephen Seto – artwork remix and reimagining
