= Hang up =

Hang up, hang-up or hangup or variants may refer to:

== Communications ==
- Hang up, the act of ending a telephone call
- Hangup or SIGHUP, a signal sent to a computer process when its controlling terminal is closed

== Film and TV ==
- Hangup, a 1974 film directed by Henry Hathaway
- Hang Up, a 1987 radio play by Anthony Minghella revived in 2008
- Hang Ups (TV series)

== Music ==
- The Hang Ups band
- Hang-Ups (album), by Goldfinger

=== Songs ===
- "Hang Up", a song from the 1954 By the Beautiful Sea (musical)
- "Hang-Up", a song on the 1971 album Morning, Noon & the Nite-Liters by The Nite-Liters
- "Hangup", a song on the 1997 Hermit (album) by Ron "Bumblefoot" Thal
- "Hang Up", a song on the 2003 album Fiends of Dope Island by The Cramps
- "Hang Up", a song on the 2006 album The Impossible Dream (Andy Abraham album)
- "Hang Up", a song on the 2008 album Fighting for Voltage by Left Spine Down
- "Hang Up", a remix on the 2009 album Smartbomb 2.3: The Underground Mixes by Left Spine Down
- "Hang Up", a song on the 2014 Lion (Peter Murphy album)

== Psychology ==
- A hang-up can be a type of Social inhibition

== See also ==
- Hang (disambiguation)
- The Hang Ups, an indie pop rock band
- Hang-Ups, a 1997 album by Goldfinger
- Hung Up (disambiguation)
