= Kampfbereit =

Video by Front Line Assembly
- Released: April 7, 2015
- Recorded: 2011
- Venue: Métropolis, Montreal
- Genre: Electro-industrial
- Length: 76:00
- Label: MVD Visual
- Director: Anastasia Blink
- Producer: Anastasia Blink

Front Line Assembly chronology
Echoes (2014)	Kampfbereit (2015)	WarMech (2018)

Professional ratings
Review scores
Source	Rating
Brutal Resonance	7/10
KrautNick	Favorable
ReGen	Favorable

Kampfbereit is a live video album by Canadian electro-industrial band Front Line Assembly, recorded in 2011 and released on April 7, 2015, through MVD Visual. It was shot during the band's 2011 Improvised.Electronice.Device Tour at the Kinetik Festival in Montreal and a number of North American cities.

== Track listing ==
No.	Title	Length
1.	"I.E.D."	5:26
2.	"Circuitry"	6:09
3.	"Angriff"	6:48
4.	"Resist"	5:52
5.	"Release"	5:22
6.	"Hostage"	6:58
7.	"Plasticity"	6:44
8.	"Pressure Wave"	5:21
9.	"Prophecy"	6:24
10.	"Shifting Through the Lens"	6:11
11.	"Millennium"	6:26
12.	"Liquid Separation"	7:14

== Personnel ==
=== Front Line Assembly ===
- Bill Leeb – vocals
- Jeremy Inkel – electronic instruments
- Jared Slingerland – guitar
- Jason Bazinet – drums

=== Technical personnel ===
- Anastasia Blink – production, direction, editing
- Vlad McNeally – artwork
- Vladimir Potrosky – audio mixing
- Ryan Merrick – DVD authoring
- Olivier Adam – second location direction
