= Amduscia =

Mexican electronic music group

- Origin: Mexico City, Mexico
- Genres: Aggrotech
- Years active: 1999–present
- Labels: Out of Line Music (Germany); Metropolis Records (USA)
- Members: Polo Acevedo
- Past members: Edgar Acevedo; Karlos Hernandez Cordoba; Raul Montelongo; Adrian Ruiz

Amduscia is a Mexican aggrotech band from Mexico City consisting of Polo Acevedo (vocals, lyrics, sampling), Raul Montelongo, and Adrian Ruiz.

== History and origin of name ==
Amduscia was founded in 1999 in Mexico City. However, in March 2010, Edgar Acevedo died due to medical complications associated with leukemia.

The group's name is derived from demon Amdusias in medieval demonology.

== Style and influences ==
Their music has been described as aggrotech and they have cited influences from "dark ethereal, dark wave, cyberpunk, old ebm school [sic], to newer style such as synthpop and future pop."

They have been compared to Hocico and Cenobita on their early releases, but by fusing the darker style with contemporary trance music approach led them to a style of their own and to gather a growing fanbase in Mexico and Europe, mostly in Germany, appearing at festivals such as Wave-Gotik-Treffen, M'era Luna Festival and a shared European tour with Combichrist.

== Recent events ==
In mid-2009, Amduscia had turned into a two-person project due to professional differences, with Raul Montelongo leaving to fully concentrate on his until then side-project LuciferChrist. On March 27, 2010, it was announced that Edgar “Amduscia“ Acevedo had died due to medical complications derived from leukemia, with the only remaining member being Ruiz. He decided to continue the band in legacy of Acevedo.

== Discography ==
Releases

| Title | Details | Label | Year |
| Perdicion, Perversion, Demencia | CD Demo | None | 2003 |
| Melodies For The Devil | CD, Album | Out Of Line | 2003 |
| Dead Or Alive | CD, EP | Out Of Line | 2005 |
| Impulso Biomecanico | CD, Maxi-Single, Limited | Out Of Line | 2005 |
| From Abuse To Apostasy | 2xCD, Album, Limited + Box | Out Of Line | 2006 |
| From Abuse To Apostasy | CD, Album | Metropolis | 2006 |
| Madness in Abyss | 2xCD, Album, Limited | Out Of Line | 2008 |
| Death, Thou Shalt Die | CD, Album | Out Of Line | 2011 |
| Filofobia | 2xCD, Album, Limited | Out Of Line | 2013 |

Remixes of other artists

| Title | Details | Track Title | Artist | Released By | Year |
| New Signs & Sounds 12/04-01/05 | CD, Sampler, Enhanced | Victims Among Friends (Amduscia Remix) | God Module | Zillo | 2004 |
| Victims Among Friends | CD, Maxi-Single | Victims Among Friends (Amduscia Remix) | God Module | Out Of Line | 2004 |
| :Per:Version: Vol. 16 | CD, Enhanced, Sampler | Ninive (Amduscia 612 B.C. Remix) | Tristesse de la Lune | :Ritual: | 2005 |
| Godsend / Menschenfresser | CD, Maxi-Single, Limited | Godsend (Remix By Amduscia) | Suicide Commando | Noise Terror Productions, Dependent Records | 2005 |
| Godsend / Menschenfresser | File, AAC | Godsend (Remix By Amduscia) | Suicide Commando | Metropolis | 2005 |
| Ninive / Time Is Moving | 2xCD, Maxi-Single | Ninive (Amduscia 612 B.C. Remix) | Tristesse de la Lune | Out Of Line | 2005 |
| Get Your Body Beat | CD, Maxi-Single | Get Your Body Beat (Rotten Blood Remix By Amduscia) | Combichrist | Metropolis | 2006 |
| Get Your Body Beat | CD, Maxi-Single | Get Your Body Beat (Amduscia Remix) | Combichrist | Out Of Line | 2006 |
| Get Your Body Beat | CD, Maxi-Single | Get Your Body Beat (Rotten Blood Remix By Amduscia) | Combichrist | Irond | 2006 |
| New Signs & Sounds 06/06 | CD, Sampler, Enhanced | Get Your Body Beat (Rotten Blood Remix By Amduscia) | Combichrist | Zillo | 2006 |
| Fuck The Mainstream Vol. 1 | 4xCD | Void Malign (Amduscia Mix) | Grendel | Alfa Matrix | 2007 |
| Harsh Generation | CD, Album + CD, Limited | Void Malign (Amduscia Remix) | Grendel | Infacted Recordings | 2007 |
| New Signs & Sounds 04/07 | CD, Sampler, Enhanced | Void Malign (Amduscia Remix) | Grendel | Zillo | 2007 |
| Praise The Fallen | 2xCD | Feel My Silent (Amduscia Remix) | Wynardtage | Rupal Records, E-noxe | 2007 |
| Smartbomb 2.3: The Underground Mixes | 2xCD | Welcome To The Future (Cunt Mix By Amduscia) | Left Spine Down | Synthetic Sounds | 2009 |

Compilations

| Title | Details | Track Title | Remix By | Label | Year |
| Elektrocinetik | CD | Fucking Flesh | | DADA X Club | 2001 |
| Machineries Of Joy | 2xCD, Limited | Evil Song | | Out Of Line | 2001 |
| Cyberpolis - A Darker Dancefloor Vol II | 2xCD | Seeing You Pray | | Cyberpolis | 2002 |
| Machineries Of Joy Vol. 2 | 2xCD | Profano Tu Cruz (Edit) | | Out Of Line | 2002 |
| Dark Awakening Vol. 4 | 2xCD | Melodies For The Devil | | COP International | 2003 |
| :Per:Version: Vol. 9 | CD, Enhanced | Fucking Flesh (Raw Mix) | | :Ritual: | 2003 |
| Machineries Of Joy Vol. 3 | 2xCD, Limited | Solo Maquina | | Out Of Line | 2004 |
| Gothic Magazine Compilation Part XXII | CD | Evil Song (Paradise Mix) | | Batbeliever Releases | 2004 |
| Awake The Machines Vol. 5 | 2xCD, Limited | Corpses Symphony (Mutilated Body Mix) | | Out Of Line | 2005 |
| Awake The Machines Vol. 5 | CD | Corpses Symphony (Mutilated Body Mix) | | Out Of Line | 2005 |
| Celebrate The Machines-An Out Of Line 10th Anniversary Megamix! | CD, Sampler, Limited | Fucking Flesh | | Out Of Line | 2005 |
| E:O:D Vol. 1 | 2xCD | Melodies For The Devil | | Excentric Records | 2005 |
| M\'era Luna Festival 2005 | 2xCD | Corpses Symphony | | Totentanz | 2005 |
| New Signs & Sounds 02/05 | CD, Sampler, Enhanced | Dead or Alive (God Mod Rotten Skin Dance Mix) | God Module | Zillo | 2005 |
| Synth & Wave Essentials Vol. 2 | 2xCD | Corpses Symphony | | ZYX Music | 2005 |
| Out Of Line Festival Vol. 2 | DVD | Profano Tu Cruz | | Out Of Line | 2006 |
| Machineries Of Joy Vol. 4 | 2xCD, Limited | Your Deep Shit | | Out Of Line | 2007 |
| Awake The Machines Vol. 6 | 2xCD, Limited | Ashes Of Betrayal | | Out Of Line | 2008 |
