= The Rabid Whole =

Canadian music group

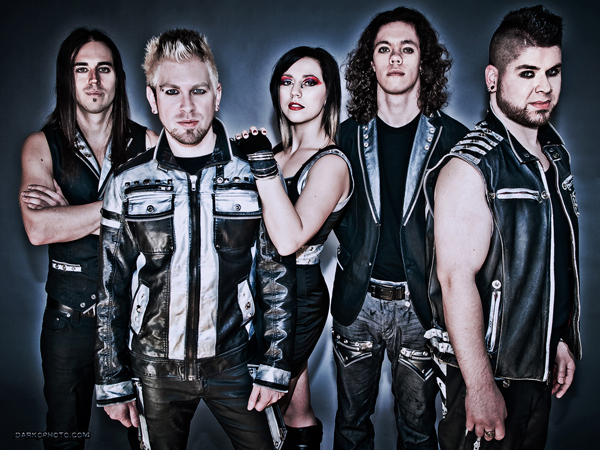
- Photo by: DarkoPhoto.com

Background information
- Origin: Regina, Saskatchewan, Canada
- Genres: Alternative Rock; Electronica; Industrial rock
- Years active: 2007–present
- Labels: Boonsdale Records; Danse Macabre Records; Synthetic Sounds
- Members: Andreas Weiss; George Radutu; Chalsey Noelle; Oscar Anesetti; Matt O'Rourke
- Past members: James McKenzie; Alex Ready; Sheenah Ko; JJ Tartaglia
- Website: http://www.therabidwhole.com

The Rabid Whole (also known by the acronym TRW) is a Canadian music group from Regina, Saskatchewan, that plays a mixture of rock, industrial, electronica, and alternative music.

On April 21, 2009, via Synthetic Sounds the band released their full-length debut album entitled Autraumaton across Canada. In November 2009, Autraumaton was released on Danse Macabre Records in Germany, for distribution in Europe, with 3 bonus remixes by 16 Volt, Mind.In.A.Box, and XP8. In February 2011 those 3 remixes were re-released for the North American market along with several other remixed tracks from Autraumaton, on the remix album Autraumaton Remixed. The band has performed with leading Canadian acts Econoline Crush, Ayria and Left Spine Down in support of their debut album in Canada and has performed with international acts such as Hinder, The Birthday Massacre, Hanzel Und Gretyl, Apoptygma Berzerk, 16Volt, and Chemlab.

== Members ==
- Andreas Weiss - songwriting, vocals, guitar, keyboards / programming
- Chalsey Noelle - keyboards, backing vocals
- George Radutu - guitar
- Oscar Anesetti - bass
- Matt O'Rourke - drums

=== Past members ===
- Sheenah Ko - keyboards, backing vocals (2009–2012)
- James McKenzie - drums (2009)
- Alex Ready- drums (2009)
- JJ Tartaglia - drums (2013)

== Discography ==
- Autraumaton (2009)
- Autraumaton Remixed (2011)
- Refuge (2012)
- Problems (EP, 2014)
