= Angriff =

Angriff may refer to:

- Angriff!, a collectible miniatures game
- "Angriff", a song by Front Line Assembly off their album Improvised Electronic Device
- Der Angriff (film), a 1988 West German television movie
- Der Angriff, a Nazi newspaper
- "Angriff", the Portuguese metal band formed in 1997.
