= Lost Alone =

Lost Alone may refer to:

- LostAlone, a British rock band
- Lost Alone (album), a 2004 album by mind.in.a.box
