= Smartbomb 2.3: The Underground Mixes =

Remix album by Left Spine Down
- Released: September 15, 2009 (Canada)
- Recorded: 2008–2009
- Genre: Cyberpunk; Industrial metal Electronic music Electronica; Drum & bass Punk rock
- Length: 2:00:12
- Label: Synthetic Sounds (Canada)
- Producer: Left Spine Down

Left Spine Down chronology
Voltage 2.3: Remixed and Revisited (2009)	Smartbomb 2.3: The Underground Mixes (2009)	Caution (2011)

Professional ratings
Review scores
Source	Rating
Regen Magazine	3.5/5 stars
Sphere UK	3/5 stars

Smartbomb 2.3: The Underground Mixes is the second remix album by Canadian Cyberpunk/Industrial metal band Left Spine Down. The double album features remixes from across the industrial and EBM spectrum from mind.in.a.box, Angelspit and Cyanotic to Psy'Aviah and Dismantled; along with all three of the band's music videos.

== Track listing ==
#	Title	Time
1-01.	Lab Tape 42 Pt 3 - July 22, 1943	1:23
1-02.	Hang Up - Angelspit Remix	4:02
1-03.	Welcome To The Future - Future 8th Mix By Splatterpunk	6:00
1-04.	Reset - Man & Machines Remix	4:24
1-05.	Last Daze - Memmaker Remix	4:07
1-06.	Lab Tape 42 Pt 2 - Assignment Report	1:16
1-07.	Prozac Nation - Retro Radio Radutron Mix By The Rabid Whole	4:00
1-08.	Hang Up - Tethered Mix By Klaxxon	4:08
1-09.	Reset - Stiff Valentine Remix	4:27
1-10.	Policy Of Hypocrisy - Essence Of Mind Remix	4:59
1-11.	Lab Tape 42 Pt 4 - August 12, 1943	1:54
1-12.	Prozac Nation - Psy'Aviah Remix	4:07
1-13.	Welcome To The Future - Electro Mix By Decoded Feedback	5:30
1-14.	Reset - Maqlu Remix	3:58
1-15.	Prozac Nation - Helalyn Flowers Remix	5:35
1-16.	Welcome To The Future - Synthetic Dream Foundation Remix	5:52
1-17.	Lab Tape 42 Pt 6 - August 12, 1983	1:22
1-18.	Controlled Voltage - kAINE-O-Matic Mix By Decree	12:56
2-01.	U Can't Stop The Bomb (Cyanotic Remix)	3:56
2-02.	Reset (Testube Treatment)	4:22
2-03.	Welcome To The Future (Cunt Mix By Amduscia)	5:23
2-04.	Policy Of Hyprocrisy (Shiv-R Remix)	4:30
2-05.	Last Daze (Psykkle Remix)	5:10
2-06.	Last Daze (Everything Goes Cold Remix)	3:37
2-07.	U Cant Stop The Bomb (Dismantled Remix)	2:47
2-08.	Policy Of Hypocrisy (mind.in.a.box Remix)	4:40
2-09.	Last Daze (Los Muertos Mix By Joey Chaos)	5:46
Video-1.	Last Daze	4:26
Video-2.	Reset	5:28
Video-3.	Welcome To The Future	5:53
