= Wake Up the Coma =

Studio album by Front Line Assembly
- Released: February 8, 2019
- Recorded: 2018
- Studio: Whitewater Productions, Surrey, British Columbia; The Green Jacket, Osoyoos; Surplus Sound, Van Nuys
- Genre: Electro-industrial, EBM
- Length: 62:26
- Label: Metropolis
- Producer: Bill Leeb; Rhys Fulber

Front Line Assembly chronology
WarMech (2018)	Wake Up the Coma (2019)	Mechanical Soul (2021)

Singles from Wake Up the Coma
- 1. "Eye on You" Released: November 16, 2018

Professional ratings
Review scores
Source	Rating
Chain D.L.K.	4/5 stars
Midlands Metalheads Radio	4/5 stars
Overdrive	Favorable
Peek-a-boo	90/100
Reflections of Darkness	9.5/10
ReGen	Favorable
Release	8/10
Side-Line	8/10
Sputnikmusic	3.5/5 stars

Wake Up the Coma is the sixteenth full-length studio album by Vancouver industrial band Front Line Assembly. It was released on February 8, 2019 on CD, vinyl and digitally through Metropolis.

== Background ==
According to singer Bill Leeb, it was a deliberate decision to make a completely electronic album: "I said 'Let's not use any guitars in this album and just really go back to the way Caustic Grip and all that kind of era was' and everybody thought that was a good idea. So we just brought it back to a sort of an EBM world where we all wanted to be just purest and more electronic."

Before dying on January 11, 2018 keyboarder Jeremy Inkel had sent demos to Bill Leeb, which the band decided to use on the album. "We thought it would be great to finish them as we know he wanted them on the record.", said Fulber, "We treated them as all the other ones 'the team' submitted, but they just have this extra feeling in them because Jeremy is no longer around." The release date of the album coincides with Inkel's birthday.

The cover of "Rock Me Amadeus" had been on Leeb's mind for some time. Being impressed with the work of Jimmy Urine, with whom Fulber had collaborated before, Leeb had approached Urine over the course of two years. "Having been born and raised in Austria, and being Austrian, there was enough of a connection", said Leeb about his choice of the cover. Enthused by the experience with the cover version, the band decided to explore working with guest singers further, all of which the band members already knew from touring activities and earlier collaborations.

== Release and promotion ==
A digital only single titled "Eye on You", originally scheduled for release on November 2, 2018, was released on November 16 to promote the album. It features Robert Görl of German electropunk band Deutsch Amerikanische Freundschaft and contains two remixes of the title track: one by Terence Fixmer and one by Orphx.

The release date of the album was moved from October 2018 to February 2019. In December, the band announced the final release date of February 8, 2019. Chris Connelly, Nick Holmes and Jimmy Urine would appear on the album as guests, the latter on a cover of Falco's "Rock Me Amadeus". In January 2019 the band revealed the album's tracklist.

Two days before the album's release, a video for "Rock Me Amadeus" directed by Jason Alacrity and Jason Jensen premiered at Baeble Music.

On December 2, 2020 Front Line Assembly released a video for the track "Arbeit" directed by Henrik Bjerregaard Clausen and starring Danish actor Kim Sønderholm.

== Themes ==
"'Eye on You' is definitely about the paranoia of our governments watching us [...], but there’s a couple of songs that are about the complexities in relationships between people today as well", said vocalist Bill Leeb in an interview with Release Magazine.

The lyrics for the track "Wake Up the Coma" were written by Ian Pickering. Front Line Assembly chose the song title as the album title because they thought it rather fitting of the album's overall theme. "It's about people that literally can't be woken but show signs of awareness, nihilistic, unresponsive in their environment.", explained Leeb, "it's like the word coma, that's somebody who's in the state of unconsciousness and has minimal brain activity. It's like wake up from your dull-drum life and react and get your brain going, show signs of awareness, rather than being so unresponsive to the environment!" Rhys Fulber said, "it's pretty much hinting at the future dystopia we are heading towards apathetically. It will take a lot of waking up on humanity's part, or more specifically the wealthy ones who control everything."

== Track listing ==
No.	Title	Writer(s)	Length
1.	"Eye on You" (feat. Robert Görl)	Bill Leeb, Rhys Fulber, Robert Görl, Ian Pickering	4:30
2.	"Arbeit"	Leeb, Fulber, Jared Slingerland, Sasha Keevill	5:02
3.	"Rock Me Amadeus" (feat. Jimmy Urine)	Falco, Rob Bolland, Ferdi Bolland	4:14
4.	"Tilt"	Leeb, Slingerland, Keevill	5:10
5.	"Hatevol"	Leeb, Fulber, Slingerland, Keevill	5:00
6.	"Proximity"	Leeb, Fulber, Slingerland, Keevill	5:21
7.	"Living a Lie"	Leeb, Craig Johnsen, Slingerland, Keevill	5:53
8.	"Wake Up the Coma" (feat. Nick Holmes)	Leeb, Pickering, Fulber, Slingerland, Keevill	5:47
9.	"Mesmerized"	Leeb, Fulber, Slingerland, Keevill, Jeremy Inkel	4:47
10.	"Negative Territory"	Leeb, Pickering, Fulber, Slingerland	6:18
11.	"Structures"	Leeb, Fulber, Johnsen, Slingerland, Keevill, Inkel	5:07
12.	"Spitting Wind" (feat. Chris Connelly)	Leeb, Fulber, Chris Connelly, Johnsen, Slingerland, Keevill	5:17

== Personnel ==
=== Front Line Assembly ===
- Bill Leeb – vocals, keyboards, producer
- Rhys Fulber – keyboards, programming, producer, mixing (5, 9)

=== Additional musicians ===
- Jared Slingerland – additional production, additional programming (2, 4–12)
- Sasha Keevill – additional production, additional programming (2, 4–12)
- Craig Johnsen – additional programming (5, 7, 8, 11, 12)
- Robert Görl – additional programming (1)
- Jimmy Urine – lead vocals (3)
- Nick Holmes – lead vocals (8)
- Chris Connelly – lead vocals (12)
- Ian Pickering – backing vocals (10)
- Matt Lange – guitars (8, 12)
- Jeff Swearengin – additional programming (4, 12)
- Jeremy Inkel – additional programming (9, 11)

=== Technical personnel ===
- Greg Reely – mixing (1–4, 6–8, 10–12), vocal recording
- Dave McKean – artwork, design

== Chart positions ==
Chart (2019)	Peak position
US Heatseekers Albums (Billboard)	15
US Independent Albums (Billboard)	40
