= Mechanical Soul =

Studio album by Front Line Assembly
- Released: January 15, 2021
- Studio: The Green Jacket, Osoyoos; Strait Sound, Roberts Creek, British Columbia
- Genre: Electro-industrial
- Length: 57:42
- Label: Metropolis
- Producer: Bill Leeb, Rhys Fulber

Front Line Assembly chronology
Wake Up the Coma (2019)	Mechanical Soul (2021)	Mechviruses (2025)

Professional ratings
Review scores
Source	Rating
Altvenger	Favorable
Backseat Mafia	7/10
Classic Rock	8/10
The Electricity Club	Favorable
The Midlands Rocks	Favorable
Reflections of Darkness	9/10
ReGen	Mixed
Release	7/10
The Spill Magazine	8/10
Sputnikmusic	Website uses tenth fractions for ratings, actual rating is 3.4

Mechanical Soul is the seventeenth full-length studio album by Vancouver industrial band Front Line Assembly. It was released on January 15, 2021 on CD, vinyl and digitally through Metropolis. It features Jean-Luc de Meyer from Belgian EBM group Front 242 and Dino Cazares from American industrial metal band Fear Factory. It contains a remix of the track "Hatevol" from the predecessor album Wake Up the Coma.

== Background ==
Rhys Fulber had the song "Glass and Leather", with its theme inspired by JG Ballard, originally intended for his solo work. After singer Bill Leeb recorded vocals for the song in Fulber's studio in Los Angeles, they decided to turn it into a Front Line Assembly song. It was the only finished title when the two started writing for the album. Although Fulber had moved back to Canada, due to the COVID-19 pandemic they worked mostly separately on the album, exchanging ideas remotely. Fulber cited the songs "Unknown" and "Purge" as examples for the influence of the pandemic on the album and commented on the circumstances, saying, "This is totally a pandemic record."

The song "Stifle" features guitars by Dino Cazares from American industrial metal band Fear Factory. The collaboration came about through Fulber's close ties with Fear Factory, as he said to ReGen Magazine: "After Bill did the vocal for 'Stifle', he thought the feel of the song would benefit from some heavy guitar accents, so I just said, 'I will ask Dino.' One call, done deal." Also, the song was proposed to be on the soundtrack for the video game Cyberpunk 2077, for which Rhys Fulber had composed several tracks, but ultimately was rejected.

The track "Barbarians" with vocals by Jean-Luc de Meyer from Belgian EBM group Front 242 is a rework of the song "Future Fail" from Front Line Assembly's 2006 album Artificial Soldier. According to Fulber, vocalist Bill Leeb felt that the old song "wasn't really highlighting Jean-Luc's vocals" and suggested "to come up with a different take". Leeb wanted "something [...] slower and more epic".

The remix of "Hatevol" under the moniker of producer Bryan Black's Techno project Black Asteroid was originally intended for a prior release, said Fulber: "We asked Bryan to do a remix earlier and we were going to release a single with the remix and a new song, but decided to just wait for the next album and add it on there. As the album came together, the remix wasn't as stylistically different as before, so we thought it would be a nice contrast."

== Release ==
On December 9, 2020, Metropolis made the track "Unknown" available to the public via SoundCloud.

== Touring ==
In fall 2021, Front Line Assembly announced that they would be presenting Mechanical Soul on tour in the United States and in Europe in 2022. Tim Skold was added to the live line-up for both tour legs. On the American leg in May and June they were supported by Swedish EBM musician Rein while on the European leg in August they joined German band Die Krupps on "The Machinists Re-United Tour" with support by German EBM artist Tension Control.

== Track listing ==
No.	Title	Length
1.	"Purge"	5:23
2.	"Glass and Leather"	6:03
3.	"Unknown"	5:06
4.	"New World"	5:07
5.	"Rubber Tube Gag"	4:44
6.	"Stifle"	4:15
7.	"Alone"	5:31
8.	"Barbarians"	4:39
9.	"Komm, stirbt mit mir"	5:38
10.	"Time Lapse"	3:33
11.	"Hatevol" (Black Asteroid Mix)	7:44

== Personnel ==
=== Front Line Assembly ===
- Bill Leeb – vocals, electronic instruments, production
- Rhys Fulber – electronic instruments, programming, production, mixing (1, 2, 4–10), vocal recording (3)

=== Additional musicians ===
- Dino Cazares – guitar (6)
- Jean-Luc de Meyer – vocals (8)
- Bryan Black – remixing (11), additional production (11)

=== Technical personnel ===
- Greg Reely – mixing (3), vocal recording (1, 2, 4–10), mastering
- Chris Liebing – mixing (11)
- Damien Rainaud – guitar recording (6)
- Jeff Swearengin – additional sound design
- Dave McKean – design, illustration

== Chart positions ==
Chart (2021)	Peak position
UK Album Downloads (OCC)	64
UK Independent Albums (OCC)	18
