= Noise Unit =

Canadian industrial band

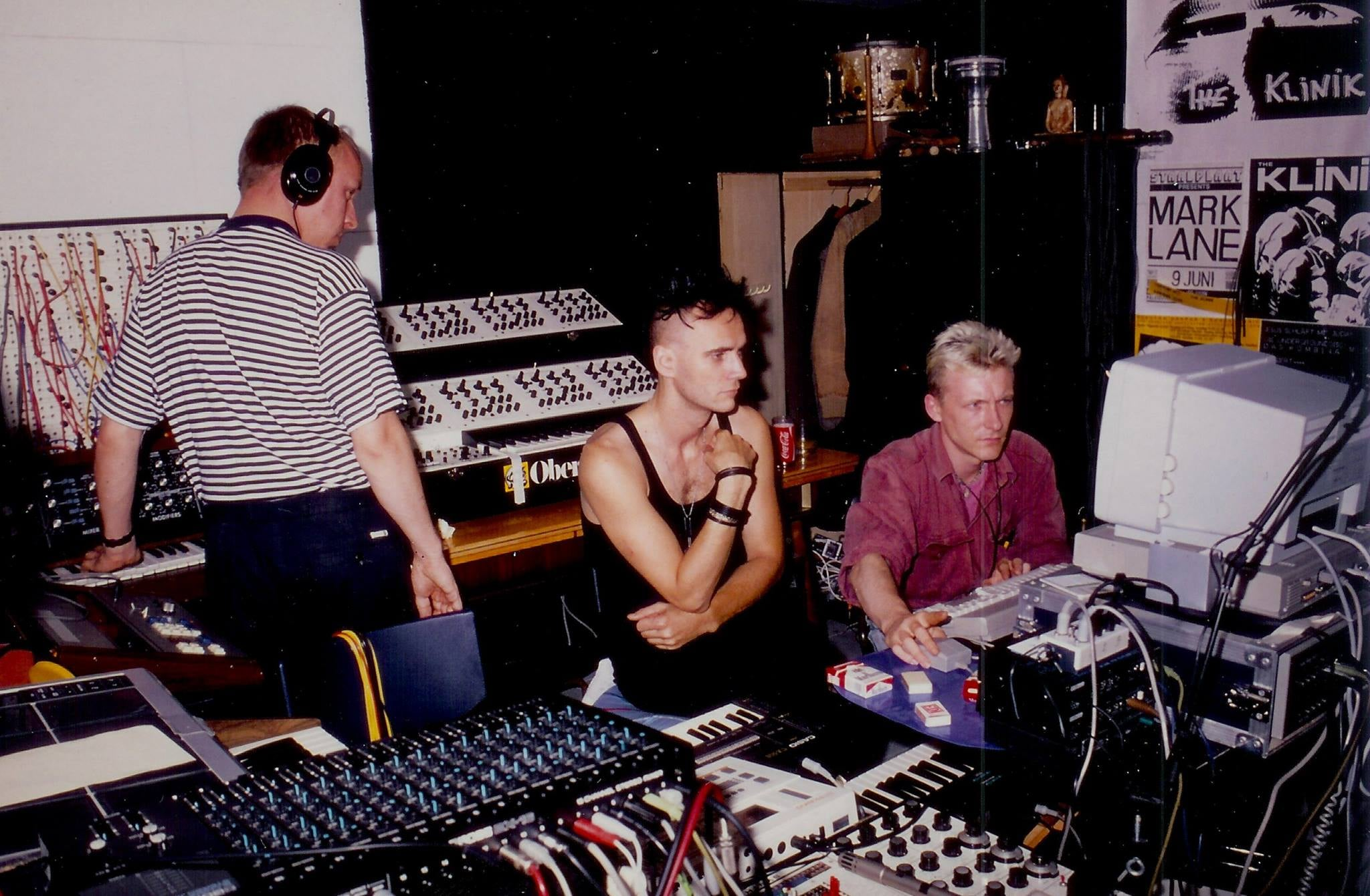
- Recording sessions for Noise Unit "Grinding Into Emptiness"

Background information
- Origin: Vancouver, British Columbia, Canada
- Genres: Industrial, EBM, Electro-industrial
- Years active: 1989–present
- Labels: Wax Trax!, Antler-Subway, Dossier, Cleopatra, Off Beat, Metropolis, Artoffact
- Members: Bill Leeb; Rhys Fulber
- Past members: Marc Verhaeghen; Chris Peterson; Jeremy Inkel

Noise Unit is a Canadian industrial band, founded by Bill Leeb of Front Line Assembly as a side project. The band has seen several changes in line-up, with Bill Leeb being the only permanent member.

== History ==
Noise Unit's first album, Grinding into Emptiness, arose from the collaboration between Leeb and Marc Verhaeghen of Belgian industrial band Klinik. It was released in 1989 through Wax Trax!, and Antler-Subway.

The 1990 album Response Frequency included Rhys Fulber. After the completion of the album, Verhaeghen left Noise Unit for several years. Fulber remained with the band for the next three releases, including the contemporary techno album Decoder in 1995.

Verhaeghen resumed his collaboration with Noise Unit for the 1996 album Drill, which also featured members of German industrial band Haujobb.

After an eight-year hiatus, Leeb teamed with former Front Line Assembly member Chris Peterson in 2004 to release Voyeur in 2005. Jason Filipchuk and Michael Balch also contributed to the album. The album peaked at #4 on the German Alternative Charts (DAC) and ranked #26 on the DAC Top Albums of 2005.

In 2016, Canadian label Artoffact reissued the albums Grinding Into Emptiness, Response Frequency and Drill on vinyl and CD.

=== Deviator ===
In May 2020, it was announced that Rhys Fulber and Bill Leeb were working on a new Noise Unit album, the first in 15 years. On November 24, 2020, album title Deviator and cover were revealed. The cover art was created by Dave McKean. In May 2021, Artoffact scheduled the release date for September 17 the same year and made the second album track "Body Aktiv" available to the public via Bandcamp. The album contained ten tracks and featured Raymond Watts on the track "Atrocity Obsession". In July 2021, Artoffact released a lyric video for this track on their YouTube channel.

=== Cheeba City Blues ===
In July 2022, Artoffact announced the release of a new Noise Unit album titled Cheeba City Blues for October 21, 2022. The announcement coincided with the release of the single Alone Again, co-written by former member Jeremy Inkel before his death in January 2018. One month later the band followed up with the release of the second single Dub It Up.

== Discography ==
=== Albums ===
- Grinding Into Emptiness (1989, Wax Trax!, Antler-Subway)
- Response Frequency (1990, Antler-Subway)
- Strategy of Violence (1992, Dossier, Cleopatra)
- Decoder (1995, Dossier, Cleopatra)
- Drill (1996, Off Beat, Metropolis)
- Voyeur (2005, Metropolis)
- Deviator (2021, Artoffact)
- Cheeba City Blues (2022, Artoffact)

=== Singles ===
- "Deceit" / "Struktur" (1989, Wax Trax!, Antler-Subway)
- "Agitate" / "In Vain" (1990, Antler-Subway)
