= Voltage 2.3: Remixed and Revisited =

Remix album by Left Spine Down
- Released: March 3, 2009 (Canada)
- Recorded: 2008–2009
- Genre: Cyberpunk, industrial metal, electronic music, electronica, drum and bass, punk rock
- Length: 78:56
- Label: Synthetic Sounds (Canada)
- Producer: Left Spine Down

Left Spine Down chronology
Fighting for Voltage (2008)	Voltage 2.3: Remixed and Revisited (2009)	Smartbomb 2.3: The Underground Mixes (2009)

Professional ratings
Review scores
Source	Rating
Chain D.L.K.	4/5 stars
Outburn Magazine	4.5/5 stars
Reflections of Darkness	4/5 stars
Release Magazine	3.5/5 stars
Regen Magazine	4/5 stars
Sphere UK	4/5 stars

Voltage 2.3: Remixed and Revisited is the second full-length album by Canadian Cyberpunk/Industrial metal band Left Spine Down. The album was released on March 3, 2009, via Synthetic Sounds and features 3 newly recorded songs along with remixes and segues. The new songs being "Welcome to the Future" along with covers of "Territorial Pissings" by Nirvana and "She's Lost Control" by Joy Division.

== Track listing ==
#	Title	Time
1.	Tape 8: Worm Holes	1:04
2.	Reset (Melt Mix) / Seb Komor	4:42
3.	Prozac Nation (Tim Skold Mix)	6:10
4.	Tape 4: Test Subject Phase 1	0:41
5.	She's Lost Control	5:00
6.	Ready Or Not (hairlip smacker mix) / The Revolting Cocks	4:52
7.	Last Daze (Burning Electro Mix) / Combichrist	4:27
8.	Hang Up (Cracknation Mix) / DJ? Acucrack	5:28
9.	Tape 23: Pharmaceutical Analysis	1:45
10.	Policy of Hypocrisy (Philthy Download Mix)	4:47
11.	Last Daze (XP8 Mix)	4:28
12.	Territorial Pissings	2:26
13.	Reset (Baal Mix)	4:48
14.	Flick The Stitch (KMFDM Mix)	4:12
15.	Last Daze (Led Manville Mix)	5:15
16.	Tape 18: Status Report #3	0:42
17.	Welcome To The Future	5:07
18.	Reset (16 Volt Mix)	4:51
19.	Last Daze (Funland mix) / The Birthday Massacre	3:48
20.	Fighting for Voltage (LSD mix) / Chris Peterson + Jeremy Inkel	5:03
