= Autraumaton =

Studio album by The Rabid Whole
- Released: March 3, 2009
- Recorded: 2008
- Genres: Alternative rock; electronica; industrial rock
- Length: 47:03
- Label: Synthetic Sounds
- Producers: Karl Schubach & Andreas Weiss

Professional ratings
Review scores
Source	Rating
Abort Magazine	4/5 stars
Chain D.L.K.	3.5/5 stars
Fangoria	4/5 stars
Reflections of Darkness	4/5 stars
Sideline Music Magazine	3.5/5 stars

Autraumaton is the debut album by Canadian cyberrockers The Rabid Whole. The album was released on March 3, 2009, by Synthetic Sounds and was mastered by Shaun Thingvold.

== Track listing ==
No.	Title	Length
1.	"All the Same"	5:59
2.	"Harder to Be True"	4:58
3.	"Selfish Nature"	4:04
4.	"The Strings Inside"	5:08
5.	"Faith in Yesterday"	5:47
6.	"Collapse"	5:34
7.	"Distant Blue Skies"	1:44
8.	"My Love, My Blood"	4:14
9.	"Tell Me Lies"	4:13
10.	"Evidence of the Fall"	5:17
