= Caution (Left Spine Down album) =

Studio album by Left Spine Down
- Released: August 23, 2011
- Genres: Digital hardcore, drum and bass, industrial rock, electronica
- Length: 79:01
- Label: Metropolis Records
- Producer: Dave Ogilvie

Left Spine Down chronology
Smartbomb 2.3: The Underground Mixes (2009)	Caution (2011)

Professional ratings
Review scores
Source	Rating
SputnikMusic	3.5/5 stars

Caution is the second studio album by the Canadian digital hardcore band Left Spine Down. It was released on August 23, 2011, through Metropolis Records.

== Track listing ==
1. "Troubleshoot"
2. "Truth is a Lie"
3. "X-Ray"
4. "Hit and Run"
5. "On the Other Side"
6. "Stolen Car"
7. "From Thirty to Zero"
8. "Overdriven"
9. "Nothing to Fear"
10. "Caution"
