= IVardensphere =

Canadian band

iVardensphere
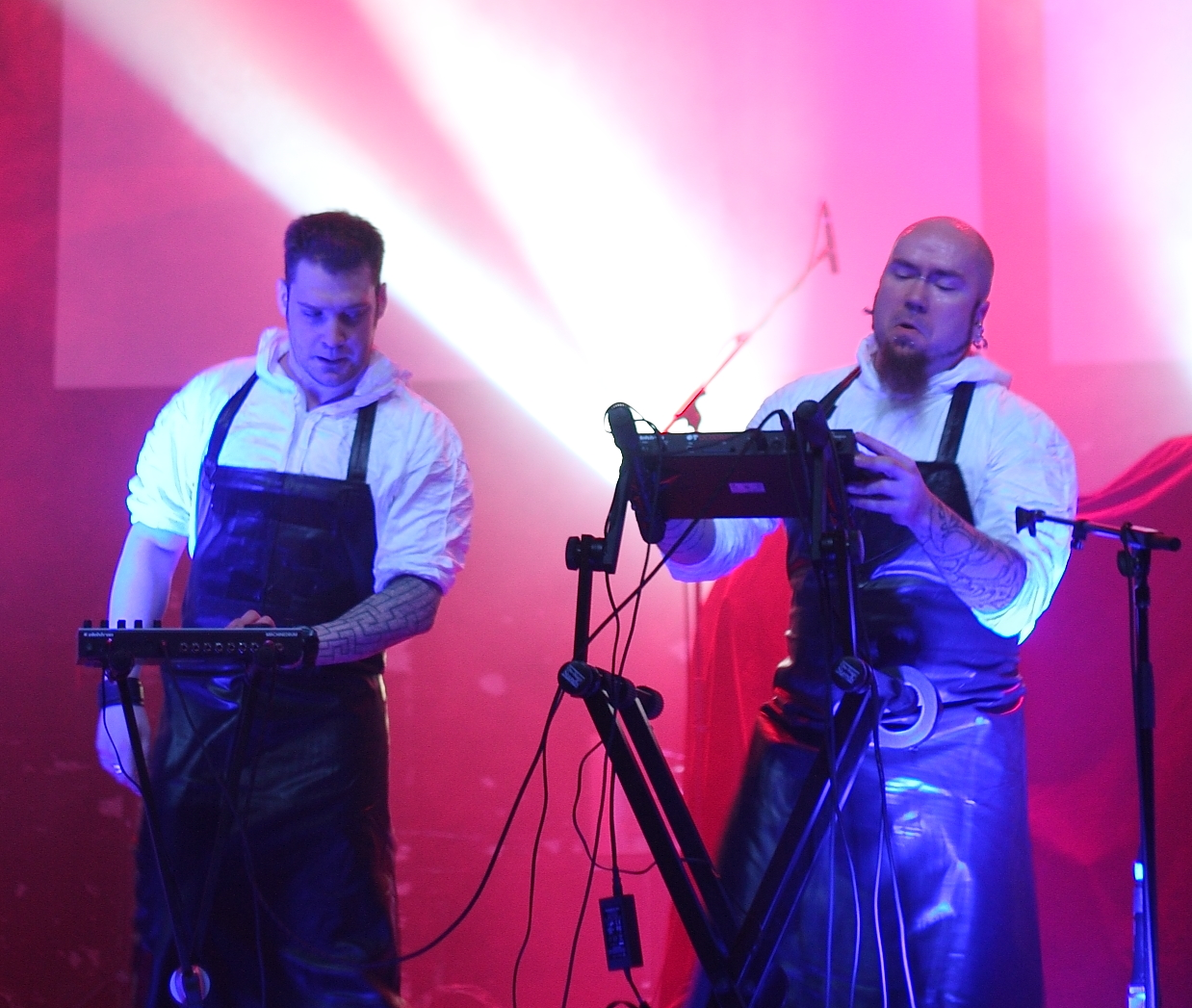
- iVardensphere, May 2011

Background information
- Origin: Edmonton, Alberta, Canada
- Genres: Industrial; EBM; Power noise
- Years active: 2008–present
- Labels: Metropolis; Synthetic Sounds (Canada); Danse Macabre (Europe)
- Members: Scott Fox; Jamie Blacker; Yann Faussurier; Chuck Murphy; Daniel St-Pierre
- Past members: Chris Lacroix; Sean Malley
- Website: www.ivardensphere.com

iVardensphere is a Canadian band that plays a mixture of tribal-tinged industrial, EBM and power noise music, based in Edmonton, Alberta, Canada.

== History ==
On June 16, 2009, via Synthetic Sounds the band released their full-length album titled Scatterface across Canada. And in early 2010, released Scatterface V2 on Danse Macabre Records in Germany, for distribution in Europe, with 4 bonus remixes. On February 16, 2010, a remix album titled Remixes Vol. 1 was released by Synthetic Sounds and featured remixes from artists such as Memmaker, Komor Kommando, and Left Spine Down.

The group has also remixed various other artists including Zombie Girl, Iszoloscope and Rotersand.

The band has played across North America with various acts and was the opening act on the fall 2010 'Making Monsters Tour' for Combichrist and Aesthetic Perfection.

In August 2011, it was announced that Metropolis Records had signed the band with the next record titled APOK and set to come out November 9, 2011.

iVardensphere released a cover of the song Roots Bloody Roots by Brazilian thrash metal band Sepultura in August 2014.

In March 2015, iVardensphere released the album Fable.

== Members ==
- Scott Fox - electronics, drums
- Jamie Blacker - vocals, electronics, drums
- Jairus Khan - electronics
- Chuck Murphy - drums, vocals
- Daniel St-Pierre - drums

== Former members ==
- Sean Malley - drums

== Discography ==
=== Albums ===
- Scatterface (2009)
- Bloodwater (2010)
- APOK (2011)
- I Dream in Noise: Remixes Vol. 2 (2012)
- The Methuselah Tree (2013)
- Fable (2015)
- Hesitation (2017)
- Exile (2017)
- Ragemaker (2022)

=== Singles & EPs ===
- Remixes Vol. 1 (2010)
- Break the Sky (2013)
- Cycle Of The Sun: Remixes Vol 1 (2013)
- Tribes Of Moth (2015)
- Stygian (2015)
- Dark Sciences Trilogy - Part 1 (2015)
- The Shattering Queen (2022)
