= Hung Up (disambiguation) =

"Hung Up" is a 2005 dance song by American singer Madonna.

Hung Up may also refer to:

- Hung Up (film), a 1973 French film directed by Édouard Luntz
- "Hung Up", a 1994 song by Paul Weller
- "Hung Up", a 2006 song by Black Wire
- "Hung Up", a 2009 song by The Cheek
- "Hung Up", a 2013 song by Hot Chelle Rae
- "Hung Up", a song by Arthur Nery from the 2019 album Letters Never Sent
- "Hung Up", a song by the Mysterines from the 2022 album Reeling

== See also ==
- Hang up (disambiguation)
