= Massiv in Mensch =

German industrial musical duo

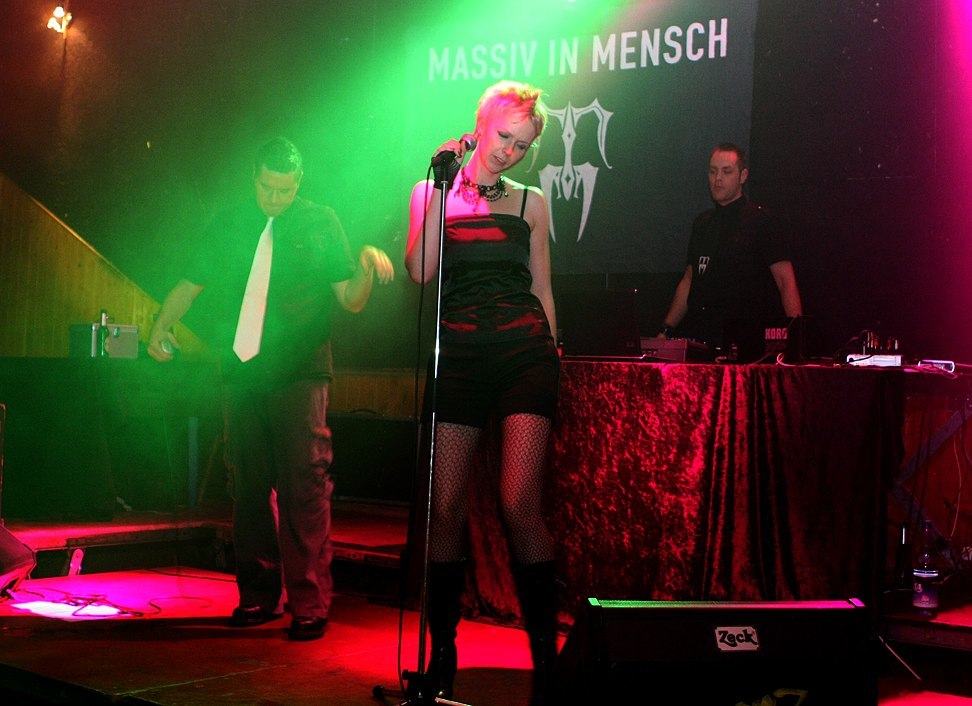
Massiv in Mensch.

Massiv in Mensch is a German industrial musical duo made up of Daniel Logemann and Mirco Osterthun (Varel/Germany). They have signed to swedish Katyusha Label in 2017. When they play live, they use additional support from Jonathan Millat, Muck Kemmereit, Thomas Rauchenecker, Tomas Appelhoff and Marwin Voß. The band was invited to play thrice at Wave-Gotik-Treffen in Leipzig in 2000, 2005 and 2012.

Their album Menschdefekt rose to 16th place in January 2005 on the French Alternative Charts. The 2017 release Am Port der guten Hoffnung is their most successful album to date.

Although most of their lyrics are in German, Massiv in Mensch is quite popular and well known in the world industrial music scene.

== Members ==
- Daniel Logemann - Programming, Sampling, Keyboards, Vocals, Lyrics
- Jonathan Millat - Guitar
- Marwin Voß – Bass
- Tomas Appelhoff – Vocals, Mastering
- Muck Kemmereit - Drums
- Thomas Rauchenecker - Keys

== Former members ==
- Sarah Folkens (Vocals)
- Holger Schuhmann (Keyboards, Guitar)
- Sebastian Schollenberger (Live Keyboards)
- Anna-Maria Straatmann (Vocals)
- Dirk Brunken (DJ, Visuals)
- Mirco Osterthun (Co-Programming)

== Discography ==
=== Studio albums ===
- 1999 - DJ Promo (out of stock)
- 2000 - Belastendes Material (Wire Productions, Triton)
- 2001 - Belastendes Material (Artoffact Records) re-release for the US/Canada
- 2002 - Die Rein (Artoffact Records)
- 2004 - Menschdefekt (Artoffact Records, 2005 Endless Records/Alive)
- 2006 - Clubber Lang (Artoffact Records, Endless Records, Alive)
- 2008 - Meanwhile Back in the Jungle (Artoffact Records)
- 2009 - Hands on Massiv - The Remixes (Artoffact Records, Advoxya Records)
- 2010 - Niemand weiß was die Zukunft bringt (Artoffact Records)
- 2011 – Hands on Massiv – The Remixes Vol. II (Artoffact Records, Advoxya Records)
- 2013 - The Cortex Zero Effect (Advoxya Records)
- 2013 - Hands on Massiv - The Remixes Vol. III (Advoxya Records)
- 2017 - Am Port der guten Hoffnung (Katyusha Records)
- 2019 - The Cortex Zero Effect (Remastered) (Katyusha Records)
- 2021 - Türkis und Schwarz (Katyusha Records)

=== EP ===
- 2002 - Uturn - an Exploration in Trance (Artoffact Records)
- 2018 - Nordsjön (Katyusha Records)

=== Digital Only Releases ===
- 2006 - Dark Rave (Artoffact Records)
- 2006 - Klang der Unsterblichkeit (Artoffact Records)
- 2008 - Supermassive Gravity (feat. mind.in.a.box) (Artoffact Records)
- 2012 – Pop Corn/Tanzmusik (Artoffact Records)
- 2013 – The Way to Oblivion (Artoffact Records)
- 2018 – Verne (Ave Maria) (Katyusha Records)
- 2019 - Badminton (Katyusha Records)
- 2019 - Gonger (Radio Edit) (Katyusha Records)
- 2020 - Tanzmusik 2.0 feat. Patenbrigade: Wolff (Katyusha Records)
- 2020 - Zero Gravity (Katyusha Records)
- 2020 - Gestrandet (Katyusha Records)
- 2021 - Monkey Islands (Jeff Johnsen-Remix) (Katyusha Records)

=== Vinyl Releases ===
- 2013 – Dark Rave 2013 (Advoxya Records)
- 2017 - Hamburg/Monkey Islands (Flexi-Disc)
- 2021 - 1996-2021 - 25 Jahre - Best Of (Katyusha Records)
