= Denyss McKnight =

Canadian musician (born 1982)

- Born: 1982 (age 43–44); Vancouver, British Columbia, Canada
- Genres: Industrial; punk; hardcore
- Occupation: Instrumentalist
- Instruments: Piano, guitar, bass guitar
- Label: 9 Lashings Records

Denyss McKnight (born January 1982 in Vancouver, British Columbia) is a Canadian musician.

== Biography ==
McKnight spent much of his early years being classically trained on piano and music theory. After relocating to the British Columbia Interior as a teenager, he started playing guitar and started several punk and hardcore bands while working as production manager for local all-ages venues.

In 2002, McKnight formed 9 Lashings Records and independently engineered and produced several releases for other bands, including the hardcore act Until We Have Faces which he joined as guitarist until 2004. 2005 marked his introduction into the Vancouver Glam punk band The Black Halos, for which he played bass, including on their 2005 album Alive Without Control.

He joined with Vancouver's industrial/cyberpunk band Left Spine Down in 2006 as bassist and in 2008 stepped up to guitar duties. In 2009, after playing on one EP and one album by Left Spine Down, McKnight left the band. He did, however, appear on The Black Halos 2008 album We Are Not Alone contributing bass, piano, and vocals.
