= The Black Halos =

Canadian punk rock band

- Also known as: The Black Market Babies
- Origin: Vancouver, British Columbia, Canada
- Genres: Punk rock
- Years active: 1993–present
- Labels: Yeah Right! Records, Sub Pop, History Music, Liquor & Poker Music, Die Young Stay Pretty
- Members: Billy Hopeless; Rich Jones; Jay Millette; Danni Action; John Kerns
- Past members: Adam Becvare; Johnny Stewart; Jahmeel "JR" Russell; Rob Zgaljic; Denyss McKnight; Matt Camirand; Davey French; Robbie Hunter; CC Voltage; Make Up Mike
- Website: theblackhalos.bandcamp.com

The Black Halos are a Vancouver, British Columbia-based punk rock band. Their music also includes some glam rock.

== History ==
The band was founded in 1993 by lead singer Billy Hopeless and guitarist Rich Jones, and at first, was called The Black Market Babies (not to be confused with the American band with the similar name). With the addition of Matt Camirand, Jay Millette and Rob Zgaljic, they released their first album, Black Halos in 1999. They then toured the U.S., playing with Nikki Sudden, the Lazy Cowgirls, L7, and The Hellacopters, among others.

In 2001, they released the album The Violent Years, on Sub Pop Records. They toured around Canada with The Offspring and Millencolin, and played Edgefest and Warped Tour. In 2009, the song "No Tomorrow Girls", from The Violent Years, was featured in the Xbox 360-exclusive racing video game Forza Motorsport 3.

The band then had some major line-up changes, when Camirand left to join Blood Meridian, and Jones left to join Amen. They were replaced by guitarist Adam Becvare and bassist Denyss McKnight.

In 2005, they signed with Liquor & Poker Music, released the album Alive Without Control and headed off for a 7-week, 40-show tour of Europe.

In 2007, The Black Halos signed with History Music and, in 2008, released their fourth album, We Are Not Alone. By this time, the band consisted of Hopeless, Zgaljic, Becvare, Johnny Stewart, and Jahmeel "JR" Russell. They played at Canadian Music Week and went on tour with Social Distortion. Later that year, while on tour, the band's van, gear and merchandise were stolen, and they decided to break up.

The band reformed in 2016, with Hopeless, Jones and some new members, and began playing sold-out shows, including a concert at Toronto's Bovine Sex Club during Canadian Music Week 2019. Some singles followed, including 2020's "Ain’t No Good Time to Say Goodbye", which was written upon the death of Hopeless' close friend, SNFU frontman and punk icon Ken Chinn (aka Mr. Chi Pig). The band is now original members Billy Hopeless, Jay Millette and Rich Jones in addition to new members Danni Action and John Kerns. In 2020, they independently released the 17-track album F.F.T.S. - Demos & Rarities, a collection of demos and rare tracks going back as far as 1996. In 2021, they released the EP Uncommonwealth. In November 2022, the band released their first full-length album since 2008, How the Darkness Doubled.

== Band members ==
Current

- Billy Hopeless - vocals
- Rich Jones - guitars
- Jay Millette - guitar
- Danni Action - Drums
- John Kerns - Bass

Former

- Adam Becvare - guitar
- Johnny Stewart - guitar
- Jahmeel "JR" Russell - bass
- Rob Zgaljic - drums
- Denyss McKnight - bass
- Matt Camirand - bass
- C.C. Voltage - bass
- Davey French - guitar
- Robbie Hunter - bass
- Make Up Mike aka M.U.M. - drums

== Discography ==
Albums

- The Black Halos (1999), Die Young Stay Pretty Records
- The Violent Years (2001), Sub-Pop Records
- Alive Without Control (2005), Liquor and Poker Music, People Like You Records
- The Violent Years (2007, compilation), People Like You Records
- We Are Not Alone (2008), History Music, People Like You Records
- F.F.T.S. - Demos & Rarities (2020), Independent
- How the Darkness Doubled (2022), Stomp Records

EPs

- XMas 2001 EP (2001, split with Bubble), Basement Boys Records
- Uncommonwealth (2021), Cursed Blessing Records

Singles

- "Retro World" / "1010" (1999), Devil Doll Records
- "Jane Doe" / "Russian Roulette" (2000), Sub-Pop Records
- "Sell Out Love" / "It's Over For You" (2000), Safety Pin Records
- "Homeless For Christmas" / "You Better Know By Now What I Want For Christmas" (2000), Sympathy for the Record Industry
- "Fossil Fuel" / "Geisterbahn II" (2016), Independent
- "Geisterbahn II" / "Tandem Drown" (2019), Yeah Right!
- "Ain't No Good Time To Say Goodbye" / "Rusty Rake" (2020), Yeah Right!
