= THYX =

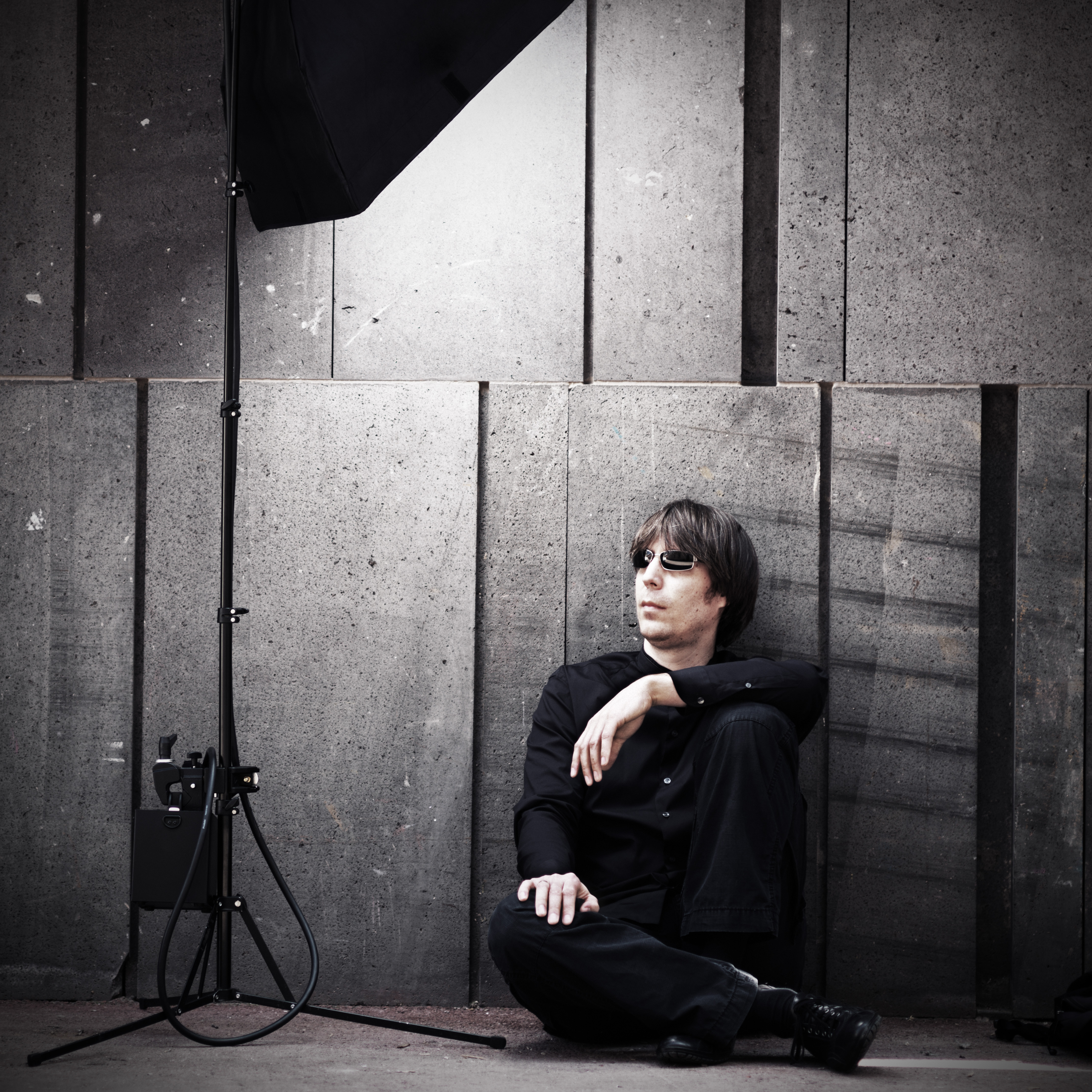
- Stefan Poiss, THYX

Background information
- Origin: Vienna, Austria
- Genres: Futurepop, experimental pop, synthpop, electronic, industrial
- Years active: 2012-present
- Labels: THYX Records, Metropolis Records
- Members: Stefan Poiss
- Website: www.Thyxmusic.com

THYX is an electronic music project created by mind.in.a.box front man, Stefan Poiss. The project was founded in 2012 and four full-length albums have been produced. Many of the THYX tracks have a complementary, but not identical, sound to Poiss's other main project; mind.in.a.box.

The sound of THYX has been described as having a crisp, entrancing, nostalgic, and distinct musical soundscape. THYX crosses the musical genres of Electronic, Progressive, Experimental, Industrial, and Electro, with many tracks suitable for club dancing. Poiss has been noted for using a signature flavor of modulated vocals, synthesized instruments, and dramatic shifts, in many of his compositions.

THYX is self-described as, "The wave between sound and resonance. Much in the same manner as mind.in.a.box, the music is heavily influenced by futurist elements and cyberpunk concepts. THYX often follows in the footsteps of mind.in.a.box regarding melody, form, and the use of digitized, delicate, machine-like vocals. Yet, THYX distinctly differs from Poiss's work in mind.in.a.box along several key avenues such as including a greater influence of musical genre sounds, and more diverse lyrical content. THYX also differs by omitting a reoccurring narrative from the discography such as that which appears across most of the mind.in.a.box albums.

== History ==
THYX was formed in 2012, although project creator Stefan Poiss has indicated that the foundation for THYX was laid around 2000 with the composition of a track entitled "THYX." This title was designed as an acronym for a particular musical state of reality. Poiss has affirmed that the THYX music project is about rediscovering this specific, elusive, musical state, that he found during musical experimentation.

THYX has been described as having taken up the banner from where other artists in alternative electronic music left off in the 1990s, and thus is distinctly experimental and unique, even within the contemporary electronic music community.

In 2012, Poiss created a fan-based track titled "Project Tape Evidence." The song was composed of various samples from individual contributors among the THYX and mind.in.a.box fan bases. The project name was in reference to the song, "Tape Evidence," which is a separate track, appearing on the 2006, mind.in.a.box album, Dreamweb.

THYX was listed by the German Electronic Web Charts for "Network Of Light" in 14th rank on 2013-06-16, as well as for "Super Vision" in 6th rank on 2014-05-17, and 4th rank on 2014-06-06.

== Contributors ==
Ray Koefoed served as the lyricist for "Ships To War," and "Survival Instinct" (Below The City). Koefoed also appeared as a vocalist for "Survival Instinct."

Joshua Kreger served as the lyricist for the songs "Roses" and "The Endless Journey"(Below The City), as well as for "The Phial"(Headless).

Will Lowe served as the lyricist for "A.I."(Headless).

Chai Deveraux served as the lyricist for "Snow In July" (The Way Home).

Gerhard Hoffler (mind.in.a.box) served as the lyricist for "In The Past" (The Way Home).

== Discography ==
=== Albums ===
- The Way Home (2012)
- Below The City (2013)
- Super Vision (2014)
- Headless (2016)

=== Singles ===
- "Network of Light" (2013)
- "Doubt and Regret" (2017)
- "Bound" (2017)

=== Special releases ===
- "Project Tape Evidence" (2012)
- "Survival Instinct" (2013)
- "Survival Instinct" Rock Remix (2013)
- "Ships to War" (2013)
- "Robots Don't Lie" (2014)
