= Absurd Minds =

German electronic music group

Absurd Minds (sometimes styled (ABSUЯD) minds) is an electronic music group from Germany. It was created by Stefan Großmann and Tilo Ladwig in 1995.

== History ==
The formation of Absurd Minds began in 1995 with Stefan Großmann (voice, composing) and Tilo Ladwig (composing, programming, sampling). Musically they were inspired by the EBM of the early 1990s. The lyrics are inspired by religion and urge the listener to think for themselves, about themselves, about dreams, deceptions by the media and the forces of nature.

In the years 1995-1999, Absurd Minds released 3 CD-R's in limited quantities, laying the foundation for further developments by the band. After a long creative phase their first concert took place at the Dresden club, Bunker. As a result of this, the band came into contact with Music Cooperation who undertook the job as management. A recording contract with the label, Scanner, followed in December, 1999. In the meantime, Absurd Minds played in Electromania II in Leipzig. The recording for their first single, "Brainwash" and album, Deception began in January, 2000.

In March, the band played live at the Nostromo Festival in Görlitz and opened for the Electromania III festival which was part of the Wave-Gotik-Treffen 2000. In December their second single, "Come Alive" appeared and in January, 2001 they began recording the album, Damn the Lie. During the work on this album the band took on a third member, Timo Fischer, who up to then had only played as reinforcement during live performances. Their third album The Focus followed in October 2003, with the singles 'Master Builder' and 'Herzlos' both doing well in the DAC. Another appearance at the Wave-Gotik Treffen followed in 2004, whilst the fourth Absurd Minds album Noumenon was released in November 2005. It would take another five years for Absurd Minds to release their fifth album, Serve or Suffer, in 2010.

== Discography ==
=== Albums ===
- Venture Inward (Album) (1998)
- Deception (Album) (Jun 2000)
- Damn The Lie (Album) (Regular & Limited Versions) (May 2001)
- The Focus (Album) (Regular & Limited Versions) (Oct 2003)
- Revived (Remix/Compilation Album) (Sep 2005)
- Noumenon (Album) (Regular & Limited Versions) (Nov 2005)
- Serve or Suffer (Album) (March 2010)
- Tempus Fugit (Album) (Jan 2017)
- Sapta (Album) (April 2020)
- Gravitas (Album) (November 2023)
- Confessions (Album) (December 2025)

=== Singles & EPs ===
- Planetary Empire Demo (Demo) (1996)
- Brainwash (Maxi) (May 2000)
- Come Alive (Maxi) (Dec 2000)
- Master Builder (Maxi) (Nov 2002)
- Herzlos (Maxi) (Feb 2004)
- The Cycle (Absurd Minds) (EP) (Regular & Limited Versions) (Dec 2006)

=== Compilation appearances ===
- "Herzlos (E3 Remix by Soman)" (Aderlass vol 2, 2004)
