= Smartbomb (EP) =

Smartomb EP

EP by Left Spine Down
- Released: June 26, 2007 (Worldwide)
- Recorded: 2005–2007
- Genre: Punk rock, industrial metal, electronica, drum and bass, electropunk
- Length: 19:52
- Label: Synthetic Entertainment
- Producer: Chris Peterson

Left Spine Down chronology
Smartomb EP (2007)	Fighting for Voltage (2008)

Professional ratings
Review scores
Source	Rating
ReGen Magazine	3.5/5 stars

The Smartbomb EP is the first studio release by Canadian Cyberpunk/Industrial metal band Left Spine Down. The album was released on June 26, 2007, via the band's website and online music retailers such as iTunes and Amazon.com.

== Track listing ==
#	Title	Time
1.	Last Daze	4:07
2.	Reset	4:26
3.	Hang Up	5:26
4.	Ready Or Not	3:53
