= Artificial Soldier =

Studio album by Front Line Assembly
- Released: June 20, 2006
- Recorded: 2006
- Genre: Industrial, electro-industrial, drum and bass
- Length: 65:51
- Label: Metropolis
- Producer: Bill Leeb, Rhys Fulber, Chris Peterson

Front Line Assembly chronology
Civilization (2004)	Artificial Soldier (2006)	Fallout (2007)

Artificial Soldier is the thirteenth full-length studio album by Vancouver industrial band Front Line Assembly, released in 2006. This is the first Front Line Assembly album to feature new member Jeremy Inkel.

== Release ==
In 2016, Canadian label Artoffact reissued the album on vinyl.

== Touring ==
The tour in North America in support of Artificial Soldier started before the album was released. The North American leg was originally scheduled for June and July 2006. However, due to difficulties with the company that supplied the tour bus the band was forced to cancel parts of the tour. They could only play about half of their planned shows in the United States, dates in New York and Canada were cancelled. At the show in Philadelphia the band announced that this would be their last show of the tour. Tour drummer Adrian White made a statement on the Side-Line forum: "Digger international who handled the bus rental has fucked us. We were lied to since we were told we had a bus until July 6th, which was bullshit. They had planned to leave us in Philly without a bus to do the rest of the tour. They, the driver and tour manager filled us in on the scam last night just before our Philly show leaving us with a couple hours to find transportation for 11 people and all of our equipment." In an interview with Side-Line right after the shortened North American tour vocalist Bill Leeb said that the band intended to make up for the cancelled dates after they would return from the European leg. Asked what conclusions he had drawn from this experience, Leeb responded: "I will never get on a bus without seeing a written contract stating that I have the bus from point A to B. Let's just say I have never been fucked by a bus company before." Supporting band Stromkern blamed the booking agency for the problems, suggesting "the booking agency [...] pocketed the deposits and has vanished off the face of the earth." In August and September Front Line Assembly continued their tour in Europe. While electronic music band and Dependent label mates Stromkern opened for Front Line Assembly on both legs, DJ? Acucrack was support act only for the North American leg and Rhys Fulber's project Conjure One was guest on a few US shows.

== Critical reception ==
Professional ratings
Review scores
Source	Rating
AllMusic	3.5/5 stars
Barcode	3.9/10
Chain D.L.K.	3.5/5 stars
The Dose	Favorable
Metal Storm	Mixed
ReGen	3.5/5 stars
Release	6/10
Side-Line	9/10
SLUG	Favorable

Reviews for Artificial Soldier were mixed. David Jeffries of Allmusic called the album "ferocious" and said, "Artificial Soldier is a return to form monster of an album that will pound the band back into the electro-industrial lover's heart."

John Carlsson of Release Music Magazine called the album "a brutal and heavy affair" but said, "Their often marvelous knack for writing great hooks and choruses ... seems to have gone missing." He also stated, "There is also very little variation to be found," and finished by declaring "if you ... want your [Bill] Leeb furious and angry, this is right up your alley."

Barcode Magazine's critic expressed his discontent over much of the album and wrote, "it's 23 minutes into the album before anything genuinely impressive happens", thereby referring to the track "Buried Alive". "With Artificial Soldier it's obvious that they've fallen into their own trap", was the magazine's verdict: "This is not only a parody of the genre but of Front Line Assembly itself, and I find that disappointing for a band that was once so creative and forward thinking."

== Track listing ==
No.	Title	Length
1.	"Unleashed"	5:19
2.	"Low Life"	5:32
3.	"Beneath the Rubble"	6:28
4.	"Dissension"	6:08
5.	"Buried Alive"	5:31
6.	"Dopamine"	6:33
7.	"Social Enemy"	5:25
8.	"Future Fail"	6:13
9.	"The Storm"	5:14
10.	"Humanity (World War 3)" (The song "Humanity (World War 3)" ends at minute 5:24. After 40 seconds of silence (5:24 - 6:04) begins the hidden track "Fawnchopper".)	13:40

== Personnel ==
=== Front Line Assembly ===
- Bill Leeb – vocals (1–7, 10), keyboard (4, 5, 8–10)
- Rhys Fulber – keyboard (1, 2, 6, 8, 10), additional programming (3), additional keyboard (3, 7)
- Chris Peterson – programming (1–9), keyboard (1–9), additional programming (10)
- Jeremy Inkel – programming (3, 5, 7, 9), keyboard (3, 5, 7, 9), additional programming (1, 4, 8), additional keyboard (1, 4, 8)

=== Additional musicians ===
- Jared Slingerland – guitar (4)
- Adrian White – guitar (6)
- Jean-Luc De Meyer – vocals (8)
- Eskil Simonsson – vocals (9), additional keyboard (9)

=== Technical personnel ===
- Greg Reely – engineering, mixing
- Brian Gardner – mastering
- Dave McKean – design, illustration, photography

== Chart positions ==
Chart (2006)	Peak position
US Top Electronic Albums (Billboard)	19
