= Left Spine Down =

Canadian band

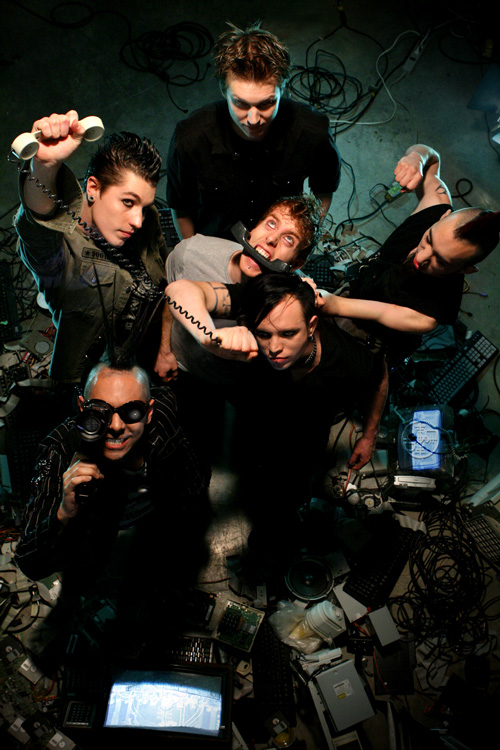
- Left Spine Down Promo Photo, 2008; left to right: Jeremy Inkel (rear), kAINE D3L4Y (front), Jared Slingerland (rear), Tim Hagberg (middle), Denyss McKnight (front) and Matt Girvan.

Background information
- Origin: Vancouver, British Columbia, Canada
- Genres: Digital hardcore, punk rock, electronica, drum and bass, heavy metal, industrial rock, industrial metal
- Years active: 2003–present
- Labels: Metropolis Records, Synthetic Sounds (Canada) (Current Label), Danse Macabre (Europe), Bit Riot Records (USA)
- Members: Kaine Delay; Galen Waling; Dan Curtis; Bill E. Organ; Adrian Black; Matt Girvan
- Past members: Jeremy Inkel; Jared Slingerland; Denyss McKnight; Tim Hagberg

Left Spine Down (LSD) is a Canadian band based in Vancouver, British Columbia, that plays what they call "cyberpunk": a mixture of electronica, metal, punk, and drum & bass.

== History ==
The group formed in Vancouver in 2001 with Matt Girvan, Frank Valoczy and Kaine Delay, with Jeremy Inkel replacing Valoczy in 2003 (Jared Slingerland joined the following year). They spent the next five years honing their skill and recruiting talent, all the while drawing attention to Bill Leeb, who hired both Inkel and Slingerland into Front Line Assembly for the Artificial Soldier tour and album in 2006. LSD had begun to build a cult following, both local and abroad, and not until they found bass player Denyss McKnight and Tim Hagberg did they self-release their debut Smartbomb EP, in June 2007. The EP was produced by Front Line Assembly/Noise Unit's Chris Peterson. Their debut LP, Fighting for Voltage, was released in April 2008 on Synthetic Sounds in Canada, and a Canadian tour followed in support of the album. Bit Riot Records picked up the rights to the release of Fighting for Voltage in the US and released the album in September 2008.

On March 3, 2009, and again via Synthetic Sounds the band released their second full-length album entitled Voltage 2.3: Remixed and Revisited. The album featured three new songs; "Welcome to the Future" with covers of "Territorial Pissings" by Nirvana and "She's Lost Control" by Joy Division; along with remixes and segues. In January 2011, the band's fourth music video was released (She's Lost Control) which made it into rotation on MuchMusic in Canada.

The band has toured North America extensively with Revolting Cocks, SNFU, 16 Volt, and Chemlab and opened for groups such as The Birthday Massacre, Combichrist, DOA, Genitorturers, and Front Line Assembly.

In May 2011, Left Spine Down signed with Metropolis Records. They released their second full-length album, Caution, on August 23, 2011, which was preceded by a new single and video for the track "X-Ray". The album was produced by well known industrial music producer Dave "Rave" Ogilvie and features the band as a four-piece stripped down from their previous incarnations as a five and six-piece band.

In late 2011, Skinny Puppy lead singer Nivek Ogre's side project ohGr announced a December 2011 West Coast USA and Canada tour consisting of nine performances supported by Left Spine Down.

In 2012, My Life with the Thrill Kill Kult announced their 25-year anniversary tour covering over 30 dates in the USA tour featuring direct support by Left Spine Down.

After the Back From Beyond Tour with My Life With The Thrill Kill Kult in 2012, the band took a hiatus to focus on other projects; Kaine Delay kept Left Spine Down active, with appearances both on stage and on record, by supporting major acts such as The Soft Moon and 3TEETH at local gigs, as well as efforts for cancer benefits, namely the Electronic Saviors compilation series and the annual Bowie Ball, a yearly tribute festival in Vancouver for charity in honour of fallen rock legend David Bowie, who died of liver cancer in 2016. Galen Waling went to join industrial legends the likes of PIG, Lords of Acid and En Esch (ex-KMFDM) across the world as a live drummer, Matt Girvan went on to work at a local venue while working on his own music, and Jeremy Inkel left the band in 2016, continuing to work with Front Line Assembly until his sudden death in January 2018.

The band had announced a new lineup on April 19, 2018, and are hard at work on a "brutal" new album with Kurt Maas (Deny Your Maker). A cross continent and European tour are hoped for 2019.

== Band members ==
=== Current ===
- Kaine Delay – lead guitar, vocals
- Bill E. Organ – rhythm guitar
- Dan Curtis – bass
- Galen Waling – drums
- Adrian Black – percussion
- Matt Girvan - guitar

=== Former ===
- Jeremy Inkel – keyboards, programming (died 2018)
- Denyss McKnight – bass
- Jared Slingerland – guitars, programming
- Tim Hagberg – drums
- Frank George Valoczy ("Comrade Skveltš") – keyboards, programming

== Discography ==
=== Albums ===
Date of release	Title	Label
2007	Smartbomb EP	Synthetic Sounds
2008	Fighting for Voltage	Synthetic Sounds / Bit Riot Records
2009	Voltage 2.3: Remixed and Revisited	Synthetic Sounds
2009	Smartbomb 2.3: The Underground Mixes	Synthetic Sounds
2009	Fighting for Voltage/Voltage 2.3 Double Disc Deluxe Edition (Europe)	Synthetic Sounds / Danse Macabre Records
2011	Caution	Metropolis Records
2021	The Fall	Re:Mission Entertainment

=== Music Videos ===
Year	Title	Director(s)
2009	"Last Daze"	Casey O'Brien
2009	"Reset"	Thana Fauteux
2009	"Welcome to the Future"	Brian Moelker
2010	"She's Lost Control"	Troy Sobotka
2011	"X-Ray"	Troy Sobotka
2021	"The Fall"	Casey O’Brien
2021	"From Thirty To Zero"	Casey O'Brien
