= Mind.in.a.box =

Austrian electronic music band

mind.in.a.box
- Origin: Vienna, Austria
- Genres: Futurepop, progressive trance, cyberpunk
- Years active: 2002–present
- Labels: Dependent Records; Metropolis Records; Dreamweb Music
- Members: Stefan Poiss
- Past members: Markus Hadwiger
- Website: mindinabox.com

mind.in.a.box is an Austrian electronic music band founded in 2002 by childhood friends, Stefan Poiss and Markus Hadwiger. Poiss is responsible for the sound, vocals, and production of their music, while Poiss and Hadwiger collaborate on developing the story and writing the lyrics. Their "technopop" sound can be described as a cross between futurepop and progressive trance.

Most songs have a cinematic feel, telling a cyberpunk story which runs throughout the albums. Lyrics are sung through vocoders but with sadness and emotion, sharply contrasting with the always-happy futurepop melody.

mind.in.a.box released their 5th studio LP, entitled "Revelations", on January 20, 2012. An EP containing club mixes of select songs from the album was released on March 9, 2012. To facilitate these releases, mind.in.a.box created their own label Dreamweb Music.

In March 2011, Stefan Poiss released the debut single from his side project THYX. The album The Way Home was released in May 2012, on Metropolis Records and Dreamweb Music. The second THYX album Below The City was released on May 14, 2013.

A new album titled Black and White was released on August 30, 2023.

== Band history ==
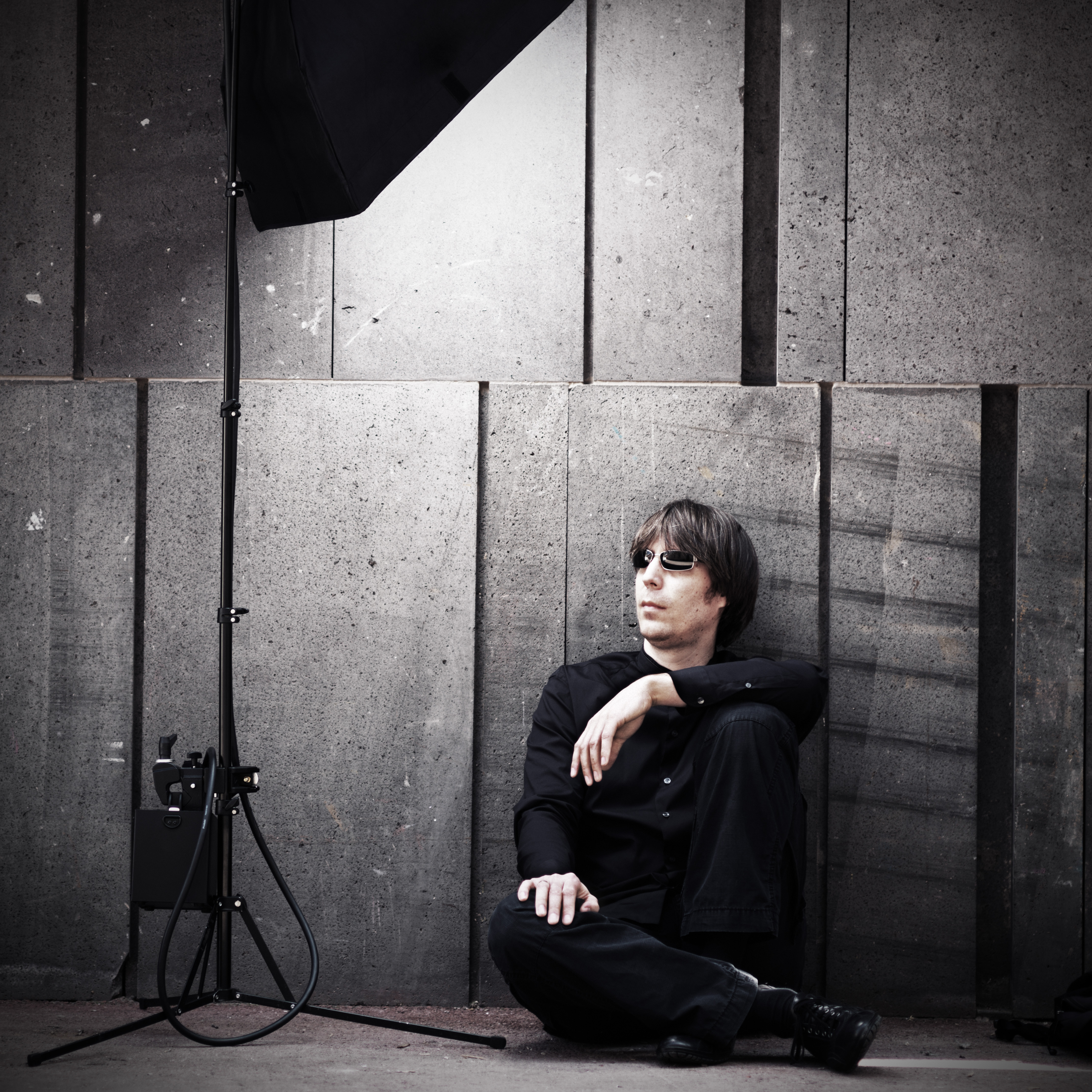
mind.in.a.box creative head Stefan Poiss

Stefan Poiss and Markus Hadwiger were childhood friends in their native Austria. Over the course of their adult lives, they collaborated on creating a number of computer games. In 2000, Poiss decided to create a music album. With Poiss writing the music and performing the vocals and Hadwiger providing the lyrics, mind.in.a.box's debut album Lost Alone was completed in 2001. After approaching Dependent, the album spent another year being tweaked and marketed before it was finally released in 2002. Lost Alone was an immediate success and soared to the number one spot in the Deutsche Alternative Charts (DAC) where it would stay for five consecutive weeks. The followup album, Dreamweb, peaked at #2 on the DAC and ranked #7 on the DAC Top Albums of 2005.

== Live setup ==
Starting in 2007, Poiss worked on plans to perform mind.in.a.box music live on stage and assembled a live line up consisting of Stefan Poiss (vocals), Roman Stift (bass), Gehard Höffler (drums) and Adam Wehsely-Swiczinsky (guitar). The live setup interprets the music in a more traditional rock setup and is paired with visuals to convey the story about Mr. Black. mind.in.a.box first appeared live in 2009 at the "Arvika Festivalen" in Sweden, followed by concerts in Montreal and Oslo at the "Elektrostat Festival".

== The story ==
For their albums, the songs feature monologues, snippets of audio logs and conversations that combine to tell a story that spans the albums. Together, they form a mysterious epic that draws on science fiction, fantasy and noir fiction.

== R.E.T.R.O. ==
In 2010, the band released R.E.T.R.O., an album separate from the story lines of Lost Alone, Dreamweb and Crossroads. R.E.T.R.O. pays homage to the days of computer gaming on 8-bit computers, with some remixes of game soundtracks as well as songs themed around 8-bit computing. All the tracks feature synth sounds styled after the sound capabilities of the Commodore 64 home computer and other machines of its day.

Following positive reception of the album, the song "8 Bits" was released on a limited edition EP.

== Discography ==
=== Albums ===
- Lost Alone (2004, Dependent/Metropolis)
- Dreamweb (2005, Dependent/Metropolis)
- Crossroads (2007, Dependent/Metropolis)
- R.E.T.R.O. (2010, Dependent/Metropolis)
- Arvika Live (2010, independent)
- Revelations (2012, Dreamweb/Metropolis)
- Memories (2015, Dreamweb/Metropolis)
- Broken Legacies (2017, THYX Records)
- Black and White (2023, THYX Records)
- Retaliation (2026)

=== EPs ===
- Certainty (2005, Dependent)
- What Used to Be (2007, Dependent)
- 8 Bits (2010, Dependent)
- Revelations Club.Mixes (2012, Dreamweb/Metropolis)
- Shades of Gray (2023)
