= Jared Slingerland =

Canadian guitarist

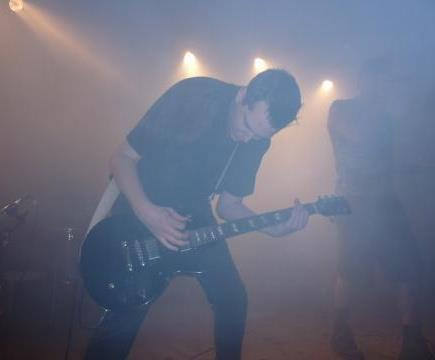

Background information
- Born: Jared Slingerland
- Genres: Electronic, industrial metal, punk rock
- Occupation: Musician
- Instruments: Guitar, Programming, Keyboards
- Years active: 2004–Present
- Labels: Metropolis, Nettwerk Records
- Website: Official website

Jared Slingerland is a Canadian guitarist and electronic musician based in Vancouver, British Columbia. He is best known as a member of the electro-industrial band Front Line Assembly (FLA).

== History ==
=== Early life ===
Slingerland's father (Glen Slingerland) was a local radio announcer on CKIQ in Kelowna, British Columbia. The family relocated to Calgary, Alberta, when his father secured an on-air position at CHR radio station (AM106). During his childhood in Calgary, Slingerland attended his first music concert, featuring Canadian band Barenaked Ladies.

=== Music career ===
After eleven years in Calgary, the family relocated to Abbotsford, British Columbia. Slingerland began playing various instruments in his early teen years, ultimately excelling with the guitar. In his late teenage years, Slingerland formed a goth nu metal project, called Ms. Anne Thropy. Producer Jeremy Inkel later joined the project and the two worked together in his home studio. Shortly thereafter, Ms. Anne Thropy disbanded. Inkel and Slingerland continued to write music together for various projects (including a trip hop project).

In early 2004, Left Spine Down asked Slingerland to join the fold. In late 2005, he began working with Front Line Assembly in the studio and was eventually asked to tour with the band in support of the Artificial Soldier album. After leaving Left Spine Down in 2008, Slingerland continues to tour North America and Europe extensively as well as contributing writing/production for such albums as Improvised Electronic Device, AirMech, Echogenetic and more.

== Discography ==
=== Albums ===
- Front Line Assembly - Artificial Soldier (2006, Metropolis)
- Front Line Assembly - Fallout (2007, Metropolis)
- Left Spine Down - Fighting for Voltage (2008, Synthetic Sounds)
- Front Line Assembly - Improvised Electronic Device (2010, Dependent Records / Metropolis)
- Delerium - Music Box Opera (2012, Nettwerk)
- Front Line Assembly - AirMech Soundtrack (2012, Valve / Steamworks)
- Front Line Assembly - Echogenetic (2013, Dependent Records / Metropolis)
- Phildel - The Glass Ghost (2014, Decca Records)
- Delerium - Rarities & B-Sides (2015, Nettwerk)
- Delerium - Mythologie (2016, Metropolis)

=== Remix releases ===
- Mindless Self Indulgence - Straight to Video: The Remixes (2006, Metropolis)
