= AirMech =

2014 multiplayer online battle arena video game

- Developer: Carbon Games
- Publishers: Carbon Games; Ubisoft (consoles)
- Director: James Green
- Composer: Front Line Assembly
- Platforms: Xbox 360; PlayStation 4 Xbox One; Windows
- Release: Xbox 360; July 30, 2014; PlayStation 4 May 5, 2015; Xbox One; May 12, 2015; Windows; March 30, 2018
- Genre: Multiplayer online battle arena
- Modes: Single-player, multiplayer

AirMech is a free-to-play multiplayer online battle arena video game developed and published by Carbon Games for Windows, with Android and VR version in the works. Originally released onto Steam's early access program in November 2012 as the game was fully released in March 2018 under the name AirMech Strike, and additionally released a version on the Xbox 360, Xbox One and PlayStation 4 under the name AirMech Arena.

== Gameplay ==
Inspired by Technosoft's popular Herzog Zwei for the Sega Mega Drive/Genesis, AirMech puts the player in similar perspective of a big transforming humanoid combat vehicle that can fly above the battle as well as land on the ground to aid units during battle. The game revolves around the player controlling their AirMech directly and then building units to assist in achieving whatever the goal of the game mode is. The player can build units and pick them up and can place them down on the battlefield to take part in the battle. The main objective of the game is to destroy the other team's fortress and/or keep the player's fortress running. The fortress spawns creeps which are infantry units that can capture outposts. Outposts are buildings that can heal AirMechs and units if they are picked up.

Players can unlock units, pilots and AirMechs with ingame currency called kudos, which are earned after each match is completed. Players also gain persistent XP on completion of matches. The player can unlock various units as their level increases. Unit types include: infantry, tanks, some light cars, stationary units (for defense or economy), healing units, and traps. Alternatively, players can purchase diamonds which can unlock units and cosmetics. Any pilot/unit/item/airmech/part that affects gameplay can be bought with kudos.

Players have one resource to manage, which is known as credits. Credits are generated by the fortress and every outpost the player owns. Different units require a certain amount of credits to be built. Players can also build special units called money makers to generate more credits. The player has an upkeep cap of around 30, although some units take up more of these slots than others. This number can be increased by capturing outposts as well as by building units known as generators.

A player can choose between nine different AirMechs and various pilots, items, and parts. Each AirMech has different abilities and stats. Pilots, items and parts provide a mixture of large stat boosts to AirMechs and units at the cost of significant downsides. Some pilots also affect credit generation and the unit cap. Items provide tiny stat boosts that do not affect gameplay significantly. Parts are equipped on AirMechs and provide minor stat boosts with a downside, with more parts being able to be equipped the more the player has used the AirMech.

AirMech features four core game modes: solo (including challenges), co-op, player versus player (PvP), and survival. A variety of custom game modes may also be selected including capture the flag (CTF) and ZobaMech which precludes unit production and inflicts damage while flying.

=== Solo ===
In Solo mode, the player plays against the AI. In 2v2 solo or 3v3 solo, they get teamed up with the AI. Solo mode also consists of 1v2 or 1v3 where the player plays against 2 or 3 AI Opponents. It has the same rules as PvP except that the player plays against the AI. This is the most recommended game mode for beginners who are just getting the hang of the game and its control mechanics.

=== Co-op ===
In Co-op mode, the player plays against the AI but with an online human player on their team. Co-op games can be 2v2, 3v3 or 2v3 for a challenge. It has the same rules as PvP except that the player plays against the AI. This mode is recommended after playing Solo and getting accustomed to the control mechanics of the game.

=== Player versus player ===
The main mode of play in AirMech is Player versus Player or PvP, which pits one side against another (there are always only two sides or teams). Players may elect to play 1v1, 2v2, or 3v3 on maps of varying shapes and sizes. The main objective of players in this mode is to destroy the enemy fortress while keeping their fortress intact. Players may capture initially neutral outposts in order to help accomplish this goal, or they can initiate direct attacks on the enemy fortress. Outposts provide map control, additional income, additional upkeep, and a place to heal units and recharge. The game ends when one fortress is destroyed. Capturing and maintaining control of all outposts for thirty seconds at any point during the match will activate "Domination", where the enemy fortress continually takes damage over time, whether or not overtime is active.

=== Capture the Flag ===
CTF is a game mode in which the main objective of the player is to capture the orb (flag) of the other team and bring it back to their fortress; doing so deals a large amount of damage (1/3rd of full health) to the opponent's fortress. To return the core home, a player should intercept the enemy carrier and wait for them to drop it on the ground, then pick it up and drop into any nearby friendly socket. Alternatively they can shoot the enemy down so the core returns to the fortress.

CTF was disabled in version 28323 on August 22, 2014 following changes to the matchmaking system. It was subsequently returned as a custom game mode.

=== Survival ===
Survival was a unique mode, played on either the "Survival" map, or the "Spiral" map. In this game mode, one to four players have to survive against nine waves of enemy units, that run into the center of the map, where the players' fortress is located. On both of the survival maps, there are four outposts which can also be captured by the player providing additional income and pads.

There was also an endless survival mode which can be played on the map "Last Stand". It plays the same as normal survival aside from the fact it entails endless waves and enemies come out of every nook and cranny.

=== Warzone ===
Warzone is a unique mode added to AirMech PC and Steam clients in July 2016. Adapting the previous "Survival" mode, Warzone is a game mode where one to four players have to survive against waves of enemy units based on the currently growing in-game lore. The win and lose conditions for this mode vary per map and the maps change on a daily basis. Winning on this map has unique victory spoils based on the lore of the game as well as the chances to unlock these maps for permanent use.

=== Challenges ===
Challenge maps offer an assortment of timed challenges to the player, such as destroy units, capture outposts, and win stacked games vs AI opponents. Theoretically there is no time limit on completing them but the timings are recorded for the sake of competitiveness and players will be given 1, 2, or 3 stars depending on how long it took them to complete them. These are mainly an additional way for new players to get familiar with the game mechanics.

== Development and release ==
AirMech was first announced on August 26, 2011 during Pax Prime 2011, and was intended to be a modern remake of the popular Herzog Zwei. The game has expanded substantially in terms of content and gameplay, following the free-to-play model.

On February 15, 2012, the Google Chrome Native Client version of the game was released. In early 2015 support for this was discontinued with players needing to use the Steam or PC versions instead.

On May 21, 2012, the game was announced to be released on Steam where it stayed closed to testers, on 9 November 2012 it entered open beta on Steam.

On August 15, 2012, AirMech was released under the open beta label.

On April 7, 2014, it was announced that Carbon Games had partnered with Ubisoft to launch a version of AirMech on Xbox 360 under the name AirMech Arena. The game was released on the Xbox Live Arcade on July 30, 2014.

Every week or two a patch is released containing bug fixes and new features.

Carbon Games has also announced plans to release AirMech on OUYA, iOS and Android in the future.

On March 11, 2015, Ubisoft announced a PlayStation 4 and Xbox One version is also under development and was scheduled to be released in the second half of 2015.

An early version of AirMechVR was playable at E3 2015.

The game left early access and was fully released on March 30, 2018.

In 2020, Ubisoft announced its decision to shut down AirMech Arena's servers for both the Xbox 360 and Xbox One versions of the game on September 6, 2020, as well as implying the removal of both versions of the game from the Xbox Store after this. However, the game remained playable after this date.

== Reception ==
Reception

Aggregate score
Aggregator	Score
Metacritic	X360: 73/100

Review scores
Publication	Score
Destructoid	8.5/10
GameSpy	4.5/5
Spazio Games	8/10

AirMech received mostly favorable reviews. Reviewers thought the game was clearly inspired by and a successor to the 1989 video game Herzog Zwei. IGN described AirMech as "It [AirMech] takes the same formula from one of the earliest RTS titles ever, adapting it to work as smoothly as a twin-stick arcade shooter, but with all the excitement that the original had with its mix of frenetic action and tactical gameplay."

Destructoid's Fraser Brown also compared it to Herzog Zwei, which it cites it as "one of the world's first MOBAs," and AirMech as "very much the child of Herzog Zwei." He concludes that AirMech "succeeds in building on the solid foundation laid by Herzog Zwei over 20 years ago, while simultaneously feeling modern and fresh."

== Soundtrack ==
AirMech soundtrack is released in 2012 as a studio album by Vancouver industrial band Front Line Assembly.
