= Fighting for Voltage =

Studio album by Left Spine Down
- Released: April 22, 2008 (Canada); September 23, 2008 (USA)
- Recorded: 2005–2008
- Genre: Cyberpunk; Industrial metal Electronic music Electronica; Drum & bass Punk rock
- Length: 69:11
- Label: Synthetic Sounds (Canada); Bit Riot Records (USA)
- Producer: Chris Peterson

Left Spine Down chronology
Smartbomb EP (2007)	Fighting for Voltage (2008)	Voltage 2.3: Remixed and Revisited (2009)

Professional ratings
Review scores
Source	Rating
Abort Magazine	4/5 stars
Absolute Punk	3/5 stars
Alternative Press	3/5 stars
Chain D.L.K.	4/5 stars
Fangoria	4/5 stars
ReGen Magazine	4/5 stars

Fighting for Voltage is the debut full-length album by Canadian cyberpunk/industrial metal band Left Spine Down. The album was released on April 22, 2008, via Synthetic Sounds in Canada and on September 23, 2008, in the USA via Bit Riot Records.

== Track listing ==
No.	Title	Length
1.	"Intro"	1:47
2.	"U Can't Stop The Bomb"	3:46
3.	"Ready or Not"	3:51
4.	"Reset"	4:24
5.	"Caught in Time"	0:59
6.	"Last Daze"	4:05
7.	"Tape 2: Further Studies and Strategies"	0:27
8.	"Prozac Nation"	4:41
9.	"Flip The Switch"	3:56
10.	"Policy of Hypocrisy"	3:19
11.	"Time Holes <?>"	1:02
12.	"Hang Up"	5:25
13.	"Future Implosion"	1:04
14.	"Ignorance is Piss"	3:04
15.	"Fighting for Voltage"	3:52
16.	"Outro"	23:23
Total length:		69:05
