= Synthetic Entertainment =

Musician production

- Founded: 2006
- Founder: Mark Sommer
- Genre: Electronic music, Industrial music, Rock music
- Country of origin: Canada
- Location: Vancouver, British Columbia
- Official website: https://m.soundcloud.com/syntheticentertainment (Sound Cloud)

Synthetic Entertainment is a concert promotion and music management/booking company focused on industrial, metal, punk and electronic rock music, based in Vancouver, British Columbia, Canada. The company spawned an in-house record label titled Synthetic Sounds distributed by Canadian indie giant Sonic Unyon.

Some of the acts booked or promoted by Synthetic Entertainment since 2006 include Hanzel und Gretyl, SNFU, Agent Orange, Combichrist, Imperative Reaction, 16 Volt, Bella Morte, Rabbit Junk, Chemlab, and Genitorturers.

Some of the acts managed by Synthetic Entertainment include Doctor Midnight & The Mercy Cult, Left Spine Down, SNFU, Raggedy Angry, iVardensphere and Dead on TV.

The first Synthetic Sounds title released was the Smartbomb EP for cyber-punkers Left Spine Down followed up by 2008's Fighting for Voltage. In 2009 the label released the debut album for The Rabid Whole, Autraumaton, along with the remix record titled Voltage 2.3: Remixed and Revisited by label cornerstone act LSD.
