= Release Magazine =

Alternative music magazine

Release Magazine is an independent alternative music online magazine based in Gothenburg, Sweden. It was born in Umeå in 1986. The first years it was run by Britta Näsman as an A5 fanzine, just for fun. When she moved to Belgium, Mikael Kahrle and Lotta Kahrle (then Jansson) took over the business gradually. They wanted slowly to convert Release to a real magazine, which they did. The web magazine was established in 1997, while the printed version was published by August 1998.
