= Artoffact Records =

Canadian/Icelandic record label

- Founded: 1999
- Founder: Jacek Kozlowski
- Genre: Electronic
- Country of origin: Canada
- Location: Toronto, Ontario
- Official website: artoffact.com

Artoffact Records is a Canadian/Icelandic record label that concentrates on industrial, postpunk, heavy metal, and electronic music. The label was founded in 1999.

== History ==
In 1997, Jacek Kozlowski laid the groundwork for Artoffact Records.

In June 2013, the label put on a live showcase performance of some of its bands, including Prospero, Encephalon, and Legend.

== Artists on this label ==
- 3Teeth
- Absurd Minds
- Actors
- Alice in Videoland
- Apoptygma Berzerk
- Ayria
- Blank
- Bootblacks
- Cabaret
- Cathedral Bells
- Cat Rapes Dog
- cEvin Key
- Chernaya Rechka
- Cloud Rat
- Coil
- Colony 5
- Controlled Bleeding
- Cyberaktif
- Dawn of Ashes
- Dead Quiet
- Dead When I Found Her
- Decree
- Devours
- Download
- Encephalon
- Fotocrime
- Front Line Assembly
- GGGOLDDD
- Ghost Twin
- Hangwire
- Headless Nameless
- Headscan
- Images in Vogue
- Individual Totem
- Interlace
- Jesus on Extasy
- Juno Reactor
- KANGA
- Kælan Mikla
- Kauan
- Kobold
- Lead Into Gold
- Leathers
- LEGEND
- Marsheaux
- Massiv in Mensch
- Mlada Fronta
- Moksha
- Monster Movie
- Nash the Slash
- Netz
- Noise Unit
- Öhm
- Ötzi
- OvO
- Panoramics
- Paul Barker
- Ploho
- Prospero
- Psyche
- Rational Youth
- Reptilicus
- Ritual Dictates
- Sacred Skin
- Saltillo
- Seeming
- Seer
- Slow
- SNFU
- Soft Vein
- Solo Ansamblis
- Sólveig Matthildur
- Spectres
- Standeg
- Strategy
- Steril
- The Diodes
- The Foreign Resort
- The Violent Youth
- Theo Vandenhoff
- Trylok
- Tunic
- Ultra Sunn
- Urban Heat
- Urceus Exit
- V▲LH▲LL
- Wingtips
- ЧЕРНАЯ РЕЧКА (BLACK RIVER)

== See also ==
- List of record labels
