= Rarities & B-sides (Delerium album) =

Compilation album by Delerium
- Released: 21 April 2015
- Genre: Electronic
- Label: Nettwerk
- Producer: Delerium

Delerium chronology
Music Box Opera (2012)	Rarities & B-sides (2015)	Mythologie (2016)

Singles from Rarities & B-sides
- 1. "Glimmer" Released: January 27, 2015

Rarities & B-sides is a 2015 compilation album with previously unreleased tracks and remixes by Delerium from the last 15 years. The first single "Glimmer" was released in January as an EP with some extra remixes. Two other new songs are included; "Aurora" featuring Swiss-Canadian vocalist Rykka and "Ray" featuring Kristy Thirsk.

Bill Leeb said about these three tracks: "These songs were literally buried in a box of tapes for more than 10 years and were accidentally unearthed by our sound engineer Greg Reely. “Aurora” having been buried in the shuffle of all of the Music Box Opera demos, is unique. The music itself goes back several years but the vocals were done more recently, so it is truly a blend of the past and the present."

== Track listing ==
1. "Glimmer" featuring Emily Haines - 4:02
  - previously unreleased, recorded at the Chimera sessions.
2. "Aurora" featuring Rykka - 4:07
  - previously unreleased, instrumental version recorded at the Music Box Opera sessions.
3. "Silence (W&W Vs. Jonas Stenberg Remix)" featuring Sarah McLachlan - 5:28
  - Only released on W&W's mix-album "Mainstage Volume 1" in 2012.
4. "Send Me an Angel (Streets of Fandango Remix)" featuring Miranda Lee Richards - 6:38
  - Previously unreleased, original version appears on Voice (An Acoustic Collection)
5. "Ray" featuring Kristy Thirsk - 6:21
  - previously unreleased, recorded at the Music Box Opera sessions.
6. "Stopwatch Hearts" featuring Emily Haines - 4:11
  - Bonus-track from the album Chimera
7. "Daylight (Edit)" featuring Matthew Sweet - 3:09
  - Unreleased edit from the canceled 3rd single from Poem
8. "After All (Revelation Mixshow by the Passengerz)" featuring Jaël - 5:52
  - Only released on promo singles of "After All"
9. "Innocente (Mr. Sam's The Space Between Us Remix Edit)" featuring Leigh Nash - 3:57
  - Previously released on the UK "Innocente" singles.
10. "Underwater (Jim Skreech Remix Edit)" featuring Rani Kamal - 3:24
  - Previously released on the UK "Underwater" single
11. "Send Me an Angel (Reely Chill Mix)" featuring Miranda Lee Richards - 4:50
  - Previously unreleased, original version appears on Voice (An Acoustic Collection)
12. "Days Turn into Nights (Teen Daze Remix)" featuring Michael Logen - 6:35
  - Previously unreleased
