= Lost and Found (Delerium song) =

Song by Delerium

Single by Delerium featuring Jaël

from the album Nuages du Monde
- Released: May 2007
- Genre: Electronic, dance
- Length: 4:07 (Album Version)
- Label: Nettwerk
- Songwriter(s): Bill Leeb; Rhys Fulber; Jaël
- Producer(s): Delerium

Delerium singles chronology
"Angelicus" (2006)	"Lost and Found" (2007)	"Silence 2008" (2008)

"Lost and Found" is the second single from Delerium's album Nuages du Monde featuring singer Jaël. She was previously featured on their single After All. "Lost and Found" was released only as a promotional single in 2007, but reached number four on the Hot Dance Club Play chart as of the week ending August 25, 2007.

Remixes were made by DJ Dan, Blank & Jones, Jaded Alliance and Niels van Gogh vs. Eniac.

A music video was also directed by Stephen Scott and released. Jaëll appears in the video.

== Track listing ==
US Promo CD and Digital Release - 2007

1. "Lost and Found (DJ Dan Club Mix)" - 8:51
2. "Lost and Found (Jaded Alliance Club Mix)" - 6:55
3. "Lost and Found (Blank & Jones Late Night Remix)" - 5:57
4. "Lost and Found (Blank & Jones Electrofied Remix)" - 9:36
5. "Lost and Found (DJ Dan Radio Edit)" - 3:04
6. "Lost and Found (Blank & Jones Radio Remix)" - 3:26
7. "Lost and Found (DJ Dan Dub Mix)" - 8:49

Niels van Gogh vs. Eniac Remixes Digital Release - 2007

1. "Lost and Found (Niels Van Gogh vs. Eniac Remix)" - 6:46
2. "Lost and Found (Niels Van Gogh vs. Eniac Dub Mix 1)" - 6:47
3. "Lost and Found (Niels Van Gogh vs. Eniac Dub Mix 2)" - 6:20

== Charts ==
Chart (2007)	Peak position
US Billboard Hot Dance Club Play	4
