= Odyssey: The Remix Collection =

Remix album by Delerium
- Released: 20 November 2001
- Genre: Electronic
- Length: 119:53
- Label: Nettwerk
- Producer: Delerium, Michael Woods, Chris Fortier, DJ Tiesto

Odyssey: The Remix Collection is a 2001 compilation of remixes from Delerium's past single releases.

== Track listing ==
=== Disc one ===
1. "Silence" (DJ Tiesto's In Search of Sunrise Remix) – 11:32
2. "Underwater" (Above & Beyond's 21st Century Mix) – 7:39
3. "Heaven's Earth" (Key South Remix) – 7:45
4. "Innocente" (Deep Dish Gladiator Remix UK Edit) – 9:54
5. "Euphoria (Firefly)" (Rabbit in the Moon's Divine Gothic Disco Mix) – 7:45
6. "Duende" (Bleak Desolation Mix) – 4:33
7. "Flowers Become Screens" (Return Mix) – 5:05

=== Disc two ===
1. "Heaven's Earth" (Matt Darey Remix) – 8:58
2. "Silence" (Fade's Sanctuary Mix) – 9:33
3. "Duende" (Spiritual Collapse Mix) – 7:54
4. "Incantation" (12 Inch Mix Edit) – 7:31
5. "Underwater" (MaUVe's Dark Vocal Mix) – 7:48
6. "Innocente" (Mr. Sam's The Space Between Us Mix) – 9:52
7. "Silence" (Michael Woods Mix) – 7:08
8. "Flowers Become Screens" (Frequency Modulation Mix) – 7:41
