= Music Box Opera =

Studio album by Delerium
- Released: October 30, 2012
- Genre: Electronic, pop, ambient
- Length: 83:00
- Label: Nettwerk

Delerium chronology
Nuages du Monde (2006)	Music Box Opera (2012)	Rarities & B-sides (2015)

Singles from Music Box Opera
- 1. "Monarch" Released: July 31, 2012; 2. "Days Turn into Nights" Released: December 18, 2012; 3. "Chrysalis Heart" Released: July 30, 2013

Professional ratings
Review scores
Source	Rating
Allmusic	3.5/5 stars

Music Box Opera is the thirteenth studio album by Canadian new age/electronic music group Delerium, released in 2012.

== Release ==
The single "Chrysalis Heart" was released on July 30, 2013. It was remixed by Sterojackers vs. Mark Loverush, Ido and Sleepthief.

"Monarch", "Days Turn into Nights", and "Chrysalis Heart" have accompanying music videos. A music video for "Chrysalis Heart" was directed by Jose Ho-Guanipa. with cinematography by Brad Rushing and editing by David Blackburn. In the video, a love triangle is seen through split-screens, where the two girls plan to kill the guy.

== Track listing ==
No.	Title	Length
1.	"Consciousness of Love" (featuring Stef Lang)	4:37
2.	"Monarch" (featuring Nadina)	5:18
3.	"Days Turn into Nights" (featuring Michael Logen)	6:08
4.	"Chrysalis Heart" (featuring Stef Lang)	3:49
5.	"Light Your Light" (featuring Jaël)	5:38
6.	"Raindown"	5:48
7.	"Sky (Tears from Heaven)" (featuring Kristy Thirsk)	7:09
8.	"Hammer" (featuring Leona Naess)	5:33
9.	"Awakening" (featuring Nadina)	6:44
10.	"Frostbite" (featuring Anna-Lynne Williams)	6:00
11.	"Keyless Door" (featuring Azure Ray)	5:05
12.	"Music Box Opera"	5:30

Limited edition bonus tracks
No.	Title	Length
13.	"Lock Down" (featuring Kristy Thirsk)	4:18
14.	"Still Kill" (featuring Leigh Nash)	6:21

Digital bonus tracks
No.	Title	Length
13.	"Stargazing" (featuring Angela McCluskey)	4:12
14.	"Lock Down" (featuring Kristy Thirsk)	4:18
15.	"Still Kill" (featuring Leigh Nash)	6:21

Deluxe edition bonus disc
No.	Title	Length
1.	"Stargazing" (featuring Angela McCluskey)	4:12
2.	"Lock Down" (featuring Kristy Thirsk)	4:18
3.	"Still Kill" (featuring Leigh Nash)	6:21
4.	"Days Turn into Nights" (featuring Michael Logen) (Seven Lions Remix)	6:08
5.	"Days Turn into Nights" (featuring Michael Logen) (Andy Caldwell Remix)	6:26
6.	"Days Turn into Nights" (featuring Michael Logen) (Andy Caldwell Dub Mix)	6:25
7.	"Days Turn into Nights" (featuring Michael Logen) (Solarstone Pure Edit)	3:44
8.	"Days Turn into Nights" (featuring Michael Logen) (Solarstone Pure Dub)	8:33
9.	"Monarch" (featuring Nadina) (Bause Remix)	6:35
10.	"Monarch" (featuring Nadina) (Molitor Remix)	5:08
11.	"Monarch" (featuring Nadina) (James Hockley Remix)	6:05
12.	"Monarch" (featuring Nadina) (Knifed Remix)	5:05
13.	"Monarch" (featuring Nadina) (Molitor Dub Mix)	5:08
