= Stone Tower (album) =

Studio album by Delerium
- Released: March 15, 1991
- Genre: Electronic, ambient
- Length: 42:58
- Label: Dossier
- Producer: Rhys Fulber, Bill Leeb

Delerium chronology
Syrophenikan (1990)	Stone Tower (1991)	Spiritual Archives (1991)

Professional ratings
Review scores
Source	Rating
Allmusic	4/5 stars

Stone Tower is the fourth studio album by Canadian electronic band Delerium. It was released in 1991 on Dossier Records.

== Track listing ==
All tracks are written by Rhys Fulber and Bill Leeb

No.	Title	Length
1.	"Lost Passion"	8:31
2.	"Bleeding"	8:02
3.	"Stone Tower"	4:52
4.	"Aftermath"	7:12
5.	"Tundra"	8:58
6.	"Spirit"	5:23
7.	"Red Hill"	6:20
8.	"Sphere"	5:54
9.	"Relics"	5:11

CD re-issue
No.	Title	Length
10.	"Embryo"	4:19

The re-issue on the Hypnotic label omits "Red Hill", "Sphere" and "Relics" in the album's artwork, but they are all included on the actual disc. On the original release on the Dossier label, these same tracks were considered bonus tracks in their own right. The track "Aftermath" (7:12) is different from the later track "Aftermath" (7:38) released on Spiritual Archives and later released under the title "Aftermath II" on the compilations Reflections II and Archives II.

== Personnel ==
Delerium

- Rhys Fulber – instruments, production
- Bill Leeb – instruments, production

Production and additional personnel

- Carylann Loeppky – photography
- Chris Peterson – mixing
- Techno Grafix – photography
