= Rani (Australian singer) =

Australian singer

- Birth name: Rani Kamalesvaran
- Also known as: Rani Kamal
- Born: 1971 (age 53–54); Sydney, New South Wales, Australia

Rani Kamalesvaran (born 1971), who performs as Rani is an Australian singer. Her debut single "Always on My Mind" reached No. 33 on the ARIA singles chart, was on high rotation nationally on Triple J and was nominated for 1997 ARIA Awards for Best New Talent and Best Pop Release.

== Career ==
Rani is the daughter of Australian-based singer, Kamahl, and his wife, Sahodra. She first came to notice by providing the vocals on "I Have a Dream" by Hatman and as a result signed with Virgin. Her first single "Always On My Mind" was released in mid 1997 and she followed up with "Trust in Me" later that year. In 1998 she issued "Living in Shadows", which was followed by her debut album, The Infinite Blue, released in August 1998.

== Discography ==
=== Albums ===
List of albums, with selected details and chart positions
Title	Album details	Peak chart positions
Title	Album details	AUS
The Infinite Blue	Released: August 1998; Label: Virgin Records Australia; Format: CD	94

=== Singles ===
List of singles, with selected chart positions
Title	Year	Peak chart positions	Album
Title	Year	AUS	Album
"Always On My Mind"	1997	33	The Infinite Blue
"Trust in Me"	1997	—	The Infinite Blue
"Living in Shadows"	1998	—	The Infinite Blue
"Underwater" (Delerium featuring Rani)	2001	—	Poem
"Surrender" (Mr. Sam featuring Rani)	2003	—	Non-album single

== Awards and nominations ==
=== ARIA Music Awards ===
The ARIA Music Awards is an annual awards ceremony that recognises excellence, innovation, and achievement across all genres of Australian music.

Year	Nominee / work	Award	Result
1997	"Always On My Mind"	Best Pop Release	Nominated
1997	"Always On My Mind"	Best New Talent	Nominated
