= Morphine (disambiguation) =

Morphine is a potent opiate analgesic drug.

Morphine may also refer to:

== Cinema ==
- Morphine (film), a 2008 Russian film by Aleksei Balabanov

== Music ==
- Morphine (band), an American alternative rock band
- "Morphine", a song by Kish Mauve from Black Heart
- "Morphine", a song by Lights from Skin & Earth
- "Morphine", a song by Michael Jackson from Blood on the Dance Floor: HIStory in the Mix

== Literature ==
- "Morphine", a 1926 short story by Mikhail Bulgakov

== See also ==
- Morpheus (disambiguation)
- Morphia (disambiguation)
