= Dead and Gone to Heaven =

EP by Rose Chronicles
- Released: 28 September 1993
- Recorded: Summer 1993
- Genre: Rock
- Length: 21:51
- Label: Nettwerk Records
- Producer: Mark Jowett & Rose Chronicles

Rose Chronicles chronology
Dead and Gone to Heaven (1993)	Shiver (1994)

Dead and Gone to Heaven is the debut EP by Canadian rock act Rose Chronicles. It was released on 28 September 1993 by Nettwerk Records.

== Track listing ==
- All songs written by Cochrane/Maranda/Thirsk/Van Der Woerd.
1. "Awaiting Eternity" (5:26)
2. "Echo of Angels" (2:44)
3. "Hollow Sea" (3:53)
4. "Clouding Doubt" (6:11)
5. "Dead and Gone to Heaven" (3:37)

== Personnel ==
=== Rose Chronicles ===
- Richard Maranda - Guitars
- Judd Cochrane - Bass
- Steve van der Woerd - Drums and Percussion
- Kristy Thirsk - Voice and Words

=== Guest musicians ===
- Peggy Lee — Cello on Awaiting Eternity and Clouding Doubt
- Anthony Cecil — Didgeridoo on Dead And Gone To Heaven

=== Production ===
- Produced by Mark Jowett and Rose Chronicles
- Engineered and mixed and edited by Greg Reely
- Assistant engineering by Pete Wonziak
- Recorded at Mushroom Studios, Desolation Sound Studios, Slack Studios
- Mastered by Stephen Marcusen
- Mastered at Precision Sound.
