= Archives, Vol. 1 =

Archives I

Compilation album by Delerium
- Released: October 8, 2001 (UK); March 12, 2002 (Nettwerk)
- Recorded: Various
- Genres: Ambient, Industrial
- Length: 62:12 (CD1); 53:44 (CD2); 115:56 (total)
- Label: Nettwerk Records
- Producers: Bill Leeb and Rhys Fulber

Delerium chronology
Poem (2000)	Archives I (2001)	Archives, Vol. 2 (2001)

Professional ratings
Review scores
Source	Rating
Rock Sound	3.5/5 stars

Archives, Vol. 1 is a 2001 compilation album by Delerium. It was released on Nettwerk Records a few months after being released in the UK. It incorporates tracks from four of their earlier albums: Faces, Forms and Illusions, Morpheus, Syrophenikan and Stone Tower.

== Track listing ==
=== Disc one ===
==== Faces, Forms and Illusions ====
1. "Monuments of Deceit" (Co-written by Michael Balch) – 4:16
2. "Inside the Chamber" – 6:19
3. "Sword of Islam" – 4:14
4. "New Dawn" – 4:54
5. "Siege of Atrocity" – 7:45

==== Morpheus ====
1. "Morpheus" – 4:54
2. "Faith" – 4:44
3. "Temple of Light" – 5:37
4. "Somnolent" – 4:34
5. "Allurance" – 4:19
6. "Fragments of Fear" – 3:56
7. "Symbolism" – 6:40

=== Disc two ===
==== Syrophenikan ====
1. "Embodying" – 5:05
2. "Shroud" – 4:45
3. "Of the Tribe" – 5:10
4. "Mythos" – 6:19
5. "Prophecy" (This song is mislabeled as "Twilight Ritual") – 5:18

==== Stone Tower ====
1. "Bleeding" – 8:00
2. "Tundra" – 8:56
3. "Sphere" – 5:53
4. "Embryo" – 4:18
