= Angelicus =

Song by Delerium

Single by Delerium featuring Isabel Bayrakdarian

from the album Nuages du Monde
- Released: December 7, 2006
- Genre: Electronic, trance
- Length: 5:10 (Album Version); 4:02 (Andy Moor Radio Edit)
- Label: Nettwerk
- Songwriter(s): Bill Leeb; Rhys Fulber; Isabel Bayrakdarian
- Producer(s): Delerium

Delerium singles chronology
| "Silence 2004" (2004) | "Angelicus" (2006) | "Lost and Found" (2007) |

"Angelicus" is the first single from Delerium's album Nuages du Monde featuring singer Isabel Bayrakdarian. The single was released only as a promotional single in 2007; Its release to DJs enabled the track to reach number one on the US Hot Dance Club Play chart during the week ending March 31, 2007.

Remixes were made by Andy Moor, Morgan Page, Redanka and Panoptica.

A music video was also directed by Stephen Scott and released, despite the lack of a commercial single release. Scott directed the video for After All before. Just like After All this video uses a post-apocalyptic city setting. Isabel Bayrakdarian appears in the video.

== Track listing ==
US promo CD (2006)

1. "Angelicus" (Andy Moor Full Length Mix) – 8:17
2. "Angelicus" (Morgan Page Remix) – 7:54
3. "Angelicus" (Redanka Remix) – 7:43
4. "Angelicus" (Panoptica Remix) – 5:46
5. "Angelicus" (Andy Moor Radio Edit) – 4:02
6. "Angelicus" (Album Version) – 5:10

Digital release (2007)

1. "Angelicus" (Andy Moor Full Length Mix) – 8:17
2. "Angelicus" (Morgan Page Remix) – 7:54
3. "Angelicus" (Redanka Remix) – 7:43
4. "Angelicus" (Panoptica Remix) – 5:46

== Charts ==
| Chart (2007) | Peak position |
|---|---|
| US Billboard Hot Dance Club Play | 1 |

== See also ==
- List of number-one dance singles of 2007 (U.S.)
