= After All (Delerium song) =

Song by Delerium

Single by Delerium featuring Jaël

from the album Chimera
- Released: June 30, 2003
- Genre: Dance, pop
- Length: 4:51
- Label: Nettwerk
- Songwriter(s): Rhys Fulber, Jaël Krebs, Bill Leeb
- Producer(s): Bill Leeb, Rhys Fulber

Delerium singles chronology
"Underwater" (2001)	"After All" (2003)	"Truly" (2004)

"After All" is a song by Canadian electronic music group Delerium, with vocals provided by Swiss singer Jaël. It was the first single released from the album Chimera.

== Overview ==
In accordance with the style taken by Delerium on Chimera, "After All" fits the pop music mold more than most of the group's music produced to date. This is evident in the song's structure, which takes the traditional verse-chorus form of contemporary pop rock, as well as tighter songwriting, with a complete absence of the extended ambient musical sections present in Delerium songs as recent as those on Poem.

The pop music form is also recognisable in the instruments in the song, including prominent use of acoustic guitar riffs.

The song received minor airplay on adult contemporary format radio stations, reflecting it being more in line with the style contemporaneous mainstream music.

== Release ==
The single release, as with all prior Delerium single releases since "Silence", marketed the song for club play by commissioning remixes (as with previous singles), this time from Svenson & Gielen, who had remixed previous Delerium songs as Airscape, and Satoshi Tomiie.

In addition, a remix contest held by label Nettwerk in the months before the single's release solicited remixes from amateur producers, with the prize being the inclusion of the winning remix on the album. The winning entry by Andrew Sega was also included on some releases of the single, as well as another entry, by Adrian Schubert.

A music video was also produced, directed by Stephen Scott. It showed singer Jaël exploring a deserted, seemingly post-apocalyptic city. Two versions were edited, one to the album version and another to an edit of the Svenson & Gielen remix of the song; each version includes one or two brief shots not seen in the other. Scott would later direct the music video for "Angelicus" from Nuages du Monde, which also uses a post-apocalyptic city setting.

== Track listing ==
US Maxi Single – 2003

1. "After All (Album Edit) – 4:06
2. "After All (Satoshi Tomiie Remix) – 10:44
3. "After All (Svenson & Gielen Remix) – 7:47
4. "After All (Amniotic Insomniac Mix by Adrian Schubert) – 3:58

US Promo single – 2003

1. "After All (Album Edit) – 4:06
2. "After All (Svenson & Gielen Remix Edit) – 3:04
3. "After All (Satoshi Tomiie Remix Edit) – 3:58
4. "After All (Satoshi Tomiie Remix) – 10:44
5. "After All (Satoshi Tomiie Dub) – 8:06
6. "After All (Andrew Sega Remix) – 7:25

UK CD Single – 2003

1. "After All (Svenson & Gielen Remix Edit) – 3:08
2. "After All (Satoshi Tomiie Remix) – 10:44
3. "After All (Album Edit) – 4:06

European CD Maxi – 2003

1. "After All (Svenson & Gielen Edit) – 3:04
2. "After All (Album Edit) – 4:06
3. "After All (Satoshi Tomiie Remix) – 10:44
4. "After All (Svenson & Gielen Remix) – 7:47
5. "After All (Andrew Sega Remix) – 7:25

European digital release – 2011

1. "After All (Svenson & Gielen Remix) – 7:50
2. "After All (Svenson & Gielen UK Edit) – 3:08
3. "After All (Satoshi Tomiie Remix) – 10:46
4. "After All (Amniotic Insomniac Mix by Adrian Schubert) – 3:56
5. "After All (Radio Pollution Mix by The Passengerz) – 3:11
6. "After All (Andrew Sega Remix) – 7:23
