= Spiritual Archives =

Studio album by Delerium
- Released: June 12, 1991
- Genre: Electronic, ambient, worldbeat
- Length: 60:39
- Label: Dossier
- Producer: Rhys Fulber, Bill Leeb

Delerium chronology
Stone Tower (1991)	Spiritual Archives (1991)	Euphoric (1991)

Professional ratings
Review scores
Source	Rating
AllMusic	3/5 stars
Music From the Empty Quarter	Favorable

Spiritual Archives is the fifth studio album by Delerium, released on June 12, 1991, through Dossier.

== Track listing ==
All tracks are written by Rhys Fulber and Bill Leeb

No.	Title	Length
1.	"Drama"	7:39
2.	"Rise Above"	6:49
3.	"Aftermath"	7:38
4.	"Ephemeral Passage"	6:30
5.	"Barren Ground"	7:32
6.	"Fathoms"	6:22
7.	"Awakenings"	10:43
8.	"Deceased"	7:26

CD re-issue
No.	Title	Length
9.	"Sermon"	7:33

The re-issue on the Hypnotic label omits "Barren Ground" in the album's artwork, but it is included on the actual disc. The track "Rise Above" contains samples of the Armenian melody "Dle Yaman" played on the duduk. The track "Aftermath" (7:38) is different from the earlier track "Aftermath" (7:12) released on Stone Tower and was released under the title "Aftermath II" on the compilations Reflections II and Archives II.

== Personnel ==
Delerium

- Rhys Fulber – instruments, production, mixing
- Bill Leeb – instruments, production, mixing

Production and additional personnel

- Chris Peterson – mixing
- Steve Royea – additional mixing
- Techno Grafix – illustrations
