= Glimmer (song) =

Song by Delerium

Single by Delerium featuring Emily Haines

from the album Rarities & B-sides
- Released: January 27, 2015
- Genre: Electronic, dance, trance
- Length: 4:02 (Album Version)
- Label: Nettwerk
- Songwriter(s): Bill Leeb; Jamie Muhoberac; Carmen Rizzo; Emily Haines
- Producer(s): Delerium

Delerium singles chronology
"Chrysalis Heart" (2013)	"Glimmer" (2015)	"Ritual" (2016)

"Glimmer" is the first Delerium single of their 2015 compilation album Rarities & B-sides featuring vocals by Emily Haines of the band Metric. Glimmer was recorded at the Chimera recording session in 2003 with Carmen Rizzo and Jamie Muhoberac.

Bill Leeb said about the song: "Glimmer reads a bit like a Hollywood mystery having been lost for years, has resurfaced by happenstance. When our music engineer and mixer, Greg Reely, was pilfering through some recordings, he stumbled upon this song that features Emily Haines of Metric."

Remixes by Emjae and Stereojackers vs Mark Loverush appeared on the single. A remix by Delerium appears on their 2023 album Signs.

== Track listing ==
Digital Release - 2015

1. "Glimmer (Emjae Radio Edit)" - 3:34
2. "Glimmer (Stereojackers vs Mark Loverush Radio Edit)" - 3:23
3. "Glimmer (Emjae Deep Remix)" - 6:03
4. "Glimmer (Emjae Club Remix)" - 5:11
5. "Glimmer (Stereojackers vs Mark Loverush Club Mix)" - 7:33
6. "Glimmer (Album Version)" - 4:02
