= Always on My Mind (Rani song) =

Single by Rani

from the album The Infinite Blue
- Released: June 1997
- Length: 4:23
- Label: Virgin Records Australia
- Songwriter(s): Rani Kamalesvaran; Paul Gray
- Producer(s): Pete Hemsley

Rani singles chronology
"Always on My Mind" (1997)	"Trust in Me" (1997)

"Always on My Mind " is the debut single by Australian singer and songwriter Rani. Released in June 1997 as the lead single from her debut studio album, The Infinite Blue, the song peaked at number 33 on the ARIA Charts in August 1997.

At the ARIA Music Awards of 1997, the song was nominated for two awards: Best Pop Release and Best New Talent.

== Track listing ==
CD single
No.	Title	Length
1.	"Always On My Mind"	4:23
2.	"Always On My Mind" (Groove Terminator edit)	3:55
3.	"Always On My Mind" (Lord's Garden edis)	4:03
4.	"Always On My Mind" (Bold New Breakbeat remix)	4:41
5.	"Always On My Mind" (Groove Terminator remix)	6:28

== Charts ==
Chart (1997)	Peak position
Australia (ARIA)	33
