= Andy Caldwell =

American DJ and producer

- Genres: House; deep house; electro house; progressive house; electronica
- Occupations: Record producer; DJ
- Labels: Om Records; Uno Recordings
- Member of: Soulstice
- Website: andycaldwell.com

Andy Caldwell is an American electronic house music DJ and producer. He became known through the San Francisco house scene in the early part of the 2000s, first as a member of the live house act Soulstice, and later as a solo artist. Caldwell has released his music via Om Records, followed most recently with releases on his own label, Uno Recordings. The Wolfgang Gartner remix of Caldwell's track "Funk Nasty" was nominated for a Grammy in 2011 under the "Best Remix" category.

== Uno Recordings ==
Caldwell is founder, CEO, and sole proprietor of Uno Recordings, which has operated since 2004. Besides releasing his own music, Caldwell has signed artists like Behrouz, Gina René, Mei-Lwun, Soulstice, Tom Flynn, Wolfgang Gartner, and Yoshimoto.

== Discography ==
=== Singles and EPs ===
- Quiet Nights (Om Records, 2000)
- All I Need (Naked Music Recordings, 2001)
- Carnaval (Om Records, 2001)
- Don't Hold Back (Inspirit Music, 2002)
- I Can't Wait (Om Records, 2002)
- Live Your Life (Seasons Limited, 2002)
- Give a Little/Searching (Area DJ, 2004)
- Pushin (Inspirit Music, 2004)
- Give a Little (Naked Music Recordings (2004)
- Brand New Day (Swank Recordings, 2005)
- The Waiting Game (Om Records, 2005)
- Everything (Om Records, 2005)
- Don't You Love Me (Om Records, 2006)
- Rumors (Celebrity Records, 2006)
- Warrior (Om Records, 2006)
- I Believe in Dreams (MoreHouse Records, 2007)
- Funk Nasty featuring Gramma Funk (Uno Recordings, 2008)
- Warrior (The Remixes) (Uno Recordings, 2009)
- Black Diamond Sky (Uno Recordings, 2009)
- It's Guud (Uno Recordings, 2009)
- Scream (Uno Recordings, 2009)
- Don't Go Home Tonight (Uno Recordings, 2010)
- Andy Caldwell and Remy Le Duc - La Guitara (CR2, 2011)
- Fear the Beard (Uno Recordings, 2011)
- Morgan Page, Andy Caldwell and Jonathan Mendelsohn - Where Did You Go? (Nettwerk, 2012)
- Andy Caldwell & Michael Teixeira featuring Lisa Donnelly - Sing It Back (Uno Recordings, 2012)
- We Are the Future (Nettrax, 2013)
- Hold the Line (Nettrax, 2014)
- Melody Like a Drum (InCorrect, 2014)
- Never Felt Better (Nettwerk, 2014)

=== Recent remixes ===
- Blake Lewis - Sad Song (Tommy Boy, 2009)
- Samantha James - Waves of Change (Om Records, 2010)
- Morgan Page and Dave Dresden - I've Had Friends (Nettwerk, 2010)
- Scanners - Baby Blue (Dim Mak, 2010)
- Ultra Nate and Michelle Williams - Waiting on You (2011)
- EC Twins and Remy Le Duc - Say Yes (Uno Recordings, 2011)
- Echo Echo - Good Morning (Uno Recordings, 2011)
- Foster the People - Call It What You Want (Sony, 2011)
- Mary Mary - Wave My Flag (Sony, 2011)
- Martin East Project - Wisdom of a Million Years (Kapa, 2011)
- Chuck Love - Assemble Your Crew (Love Network, 2011)
- Beyoncé - Best Thing I Never Had (Columbia, 2011)
- 3kOHM featuring Sy Smith - Get Love (Uno Recordings, 2012)
- Christian Burns, Paul Oakenfold & Jes - As We Collide (Armada, 2012)
- Delerium feat. Michael Logen - Days Turn Into Nights (Nettwerk, 2012)
- Major Lazer - Jah No Partial (Mad Decent, 2012)
- Lenny Kravitz - Superlove (Atlantic Records/Roadrunner Records, 2012)

=== Compilations ===
- Sounds of Om Vol 2 (Om Records, 2000)
- InSoul Sessions Vol 1 (Inspirit Music, 2002)
- InHouse Perspectives 02 (Inspirit Music, 2004)
- Late Night with Andy Caldwell (Swank Recordings, 2005)
- Hemmespheres v4 (Jam Records Australia, 2006)
- Bar Grooves the Spring Collection (Bar Grooves, 2007)
- Om Dubai (Om Records, 2007)

=== Studio albums ===
- Universal Truth (Om, 2006)
- Obsession (Tommy Boy, 2009)
- Genesis (UNO, 2021)
