= Lit from Within =

Compilation album
- Released: 1995
- Label: Nettwerk

Lit from Within is a Canadian compilation album, released on Nettwerk in 1995. A benefit album to raise money for rape crisis centres in Canada, the album featured songs by several Canadian musicians, short literary readings by a number of noted Canadian writers, and the photographs of Vancouver artist, Beth Carruthers.

== Track listing ==
1. Lorna Crozier, "Fear of Snakes"
2. Meryn Cadell, "Save"
3. Kate & Anna McGarrigle, "Rainbow Ride"
4. Evelyn Lau, "Bruises"
5. Suzanne Little, "Swept Away"
6. Crash Vegas, "Clinic"
7. Veda Hille, "Well I Guess Not"
8. Sarah McLachlan, "Good Enough"
9. Lynn Crosbie, "For Jayne Mansfield"
10. Taste of Joy, "Dear John"
11. Tara MacLean, "Let Her Feel the Rain"
12. Mae Moore, "Pieces of Clay"
13. Evelyn Lau, "Nineteen"
14. Kristy Thirsk, "Songbird"
15. Lorna Crozier, "Dictionary of Symbols"
