= Happily Ever After (Rose Chronicles album) =

Studio album by Rose Chronicles
- Released: 29 October 1996
- Genre: Rock
- Length: 62:23
- Label: Nettwerk Records
- Producer: Kevin Hamilton, Vincent Jones & Rose Chronicles

Rose Chronicles chronology
Shiver (1994)	Happily Ever After (1996)

Happily Ever After was the last album by Canadian rock act Rose Chronicles. It was released in 1996 by Nettwerk Records.

== Track listing ==
- All songs written by Cochrane/Maranda/Thirsk/Van Der Woerd.
1. "Bruise" (3:43)
2. "Vicious Thorn" (3:27)
3. "Blood Red" (4:51)
4. "Voice in Jail" (4:34)
5. "Breath Is a Dagger" (3:31)
6. "Torn" (5:12)
7. "Ornament" (5:26)
8. "Acquiesce" (5:33)
9. "Heaven Tide" (6:35)
10. "Thrown to the Sand" (2:52)
11. "Krayon" (3:55)
12. "Spill" (5:15)
13. "Lovely Psycho" (7:29)

== Personnel ==
=== Rose Chronicles ===
- Richard Maranda - Guitars
- Judd Cochrane - Bass
- Steve van der Woerd - Drums and Percussion
- Kristy Thirsk - Voice and Words

=== Guests ===
- Trevor Grant - Drums on "Krayon"
- Howard Redekop - Bass on "Krayon"

=== Production ===
- Produced by Kevin Hamilton, Vincent Jones and Rose Chronicles.
- Engineered by Kevin Hamilton.
- Mixed by Kevin Hamilton, Mike Plotnikoff and Greg Reely.
- Mastered by George Marino.
- Design by John Rummen.
- Photography by Adina Shore.
