= Monarch (song) =

Song by Delerium

Single by Delerium featuring Nadina

from the album Music Box Opera
- Released: July 31, 2012
- Genre: Electronic, dance
- Length: 5:18 (Album Version)
- Label: Nettwerk
- Songwriter(s): Bill Leeb; Rhys Fulber; Nadina Zarifeh
- Producer(s): Delerium

Delerium singles chronology
"Dust in Gravity" (2010)	"Monarch" (2012)	"Days Turn into Nights" (2012)

"Monarch" is the first single from Delerium's album Music Box Opera featuring Lebanese singer Nadina.

Remixes were made by Molitor, James Hockley, knifed and Bause.

A music video was also directed with a low budget aimed at social media like Facebook and YouTube, according to Bill Leeb. He also stated that this single was a sort of viral single release, mostly to get things moving.

== Track listing ==
Digital Release - 2012

1. "Monarch (Album Version)" - 5:18
2. "Monarch (Radio Edit) " - 4:00
3. "Monarch (Bause Remix)" - 6:35 Beatport Exclusive
4. "Monarch (Molitor Remix) " - 5:07
5. "Monarch (James Hockley Remix) " - 6:05
6. "Monarch (knifed Remix) " - 5:04
7. "Monarch (Bause Radio Edit) " - 3:33
8. "Monarch (James Hockley Radio Edit)" - 3:00
9. "Monarch (Molitor Radio Edit)" - 3:16
10. "Monarch (Molitor Dub Mix)" - 5:07
11. "Monarch (Bause Instrumental Mix)" - 6:35

== Charts ==
Chart (2012)	Peak position
US Billboard Hot Dance Club Play	33
