= Truly (Delerium song) =

Song by Delerium

Single by Delerium featuring Nerina Pallot

from the album Chimera and The Best Of
- Released: February 10, 2004
- Genre: Electronic, trance
- Length: 4:38 (Album Version); 3:46 (The Wise Buddah Edit)
- Label: Nettwerk
- Songwriter(s): Bill Leeb; Nerina Pallot; Carmen Rizzo; Jamie Muhoberac
- Producer(s): Bill Leeb; Carmen Rizzo

Delerium singles chronology
"After All" (2003)	"Truly" (2004)	"Silence 2004" (2004)

"Truly" is the second single from Delerium's album Chimera featuring singer Nerina Pallot.

Just like the rest of the album, this song has a much more pop feel than Delerium's previous work.

Also this single was released with a remix as a radio version. This time with a remix by Wise Buddah. Other remixes were made by Infusion, Brother Brown and Signum.

There was no video made for the single.

== Track listing ==
US CD Single - 2004

1. "Truly (The Wise Buddah Edit)" - 3:46
2. "Truly (Infusion Remix)" - 9:49
3. "Truly (Brother Brown Remix)" - 9:30
4. "Truly (Signum Remix)" - 8:03
5. "Truly (The Wise Buddah Mix)" - 7:21
6. "Truly (Brother Brown Dub)" - 9:30

US Vinyl - 2004

1. "Truly (Infusion Remix)" - 9:49
2. "Truly (Brother Brown Remix)" - 9:30
3. "Truly (Signum Remix)" - 8:03
4. "Truly (The Wise Buddah Club Mix)" - 7:21

UK CD-Maxi - 2004

1. "Truly (The Wise Buddah Club Mix - Radio Edit)" - 3:41 This version is different from the other Wise Buddah Edit.
2. "Truly (Signum Remix)" - 8:03
3. "Truly (Infusion Remix)" - 9:49
4. "Truly (Brother Brown Remix)" - 9:30
5. "Truly (Album Version Edit)" - 3:38

Europe CD-maxi - 2004

1. "Truly (The Wise Buddah Edit)" - 3:46
2. "Truly (Infusion Remix)" - 9:49
3. "Truly (Signum Remix)" - 8:03
4. "Truly (The Wise Buddah Mix)" - 7:21
5. "Truly (Brother Brown Remix)" - 9:30

== Charts ==
Chart (2004)	Peak position
United Kingdom (The Official Charts Company)	54
US Billboard Hot Dance Club Play	2
