= Spheres (Delerium album) =

Studio album by Delerium
- Released: February 13, 1994
- Genre: Electronic, ambient, worldbeat
- Length: 63:19
- Producer: Bill Leeb, Rhys Fulber

Delerium chronology
Euphoric (1991)	Spheres (1994)	Semantic Spaces (1994)

Professional ratings
Review scores
Source	Rating
AllMusic	4/5 stars

Spheres is the sixth studio album by Canadian industrial/electronic music group Delerium in 1994 (see 1994 in music).

== Track listing ==
1. "Monolith" – 10:03
2. "Transmitter" – 13:36
3. "Wavelength" – 13:22
4. "Colony" – 12:06
5. "Dark Matter" – 7:30
6. "Cloud Barrier" – 6:42
7. "Turmoil" (Bonus track on Re-Release) – 3:43

== Other ==
- This album presents samples from Vangelis' 1492: Conquest of Paradise and Stanley Kubrick's A Space Odyssey
- The track "Dark Matter" appears on the electronic/ambient compilation Space Daze, 1994 Cleopatra Records.
