= Shiver (Rose Chronicles album) =

Studio album by Rose Chronicles
- Released: 1994
- Recorded: 1994
- Genre: Rock
- Length: 55m33s
- Label: Nettwerk Records
- Producer: Mark Jowett & Rose Chronicles

Rose Chronicles chronology
Dead and Gone to Heaven (1993)	Shiver (1994)	Happily Ever After (1996)

Shiver is the debut album by Canadian rock act Rose Chronicles. It was released in 1994 by Nettwerk Records.

The album won the Juno Award for Best Alternative Album at the Juno Awards of 1995.

== Track listing ==
- All songs written by Cochrane/Maranda/Thirsk/Van Der Woerd.
1. "Dwelling" (4:45)
2. "Glide (Free Above)" (3:45)
3. "Nothing's Real" (4:39)
4. "Diedre" (2:57)
5. "Brick and Glue" (5:10)
6. "Undertow" (4:27)
7. "Bottle Song" (4:53)
8. "Visions" (8:09)
9. "Shiver" (0:53)
10. "Forgotten" (3:44)
11. "Awaiting Eternity" [Remix] (5:21)
12. "Visions" [Alternate Version] (4:44) After a 2:03 gap

== Personnel ==
=== Rose Chronicles ===
- Richard Maranda - Guitars
- Judd Cochrane - Bass
- Steve van der Woerd - Drums and Percussion
- Kristy Thirsk - Voice and Words

=== Guests ===
- Peggy Lee - All cello
- Greg Reely - Shakers (on "Visions")

=== Production ===
- Produced by Mark Jowett and Rose Chronicles
- Engineered, mixed and edited by Greg Reely
- Mixed by Alan Moulder ("Awaiting Eternity")
- Recorded at Mushroom Studios, Desolation Sound Studios, Slack Studios
