= Semantic Spaces =

Studio album by Delerium
- Released: August 23, 1994
- Genre: Electronica, ambient, worldbeat
- Length: 77:34
- Label: Nettwerk
- Producer: Bill Leeb, Rhys Fulber

Delerium chronology
Spheres (1994)	Semantic Spaces (1994)	Spheres 2 (1994)

Professional ratings
Review scores
Source	Rating
Allmusic	3/5 stars

Semantic Spaces is the seventh studio album by Canadian industrial/electronic music group Delerium in 1994. Guest musicians on the album include Greg Reely and Kristy Thirsk. Thirsk was dubbed "The Voice of Delerium" for providing vocals to "Flowers Become Screens", "Incantation", "Metamorphosis" and "Flatlands".

== Release ==
"Flowers Become Screens" is the single taken from Semantic Spaces. The B-side of the single is the track "Incantation" from the same album. In some territories, "Incantation" was used as the A-side of the single instead of "Flowers Become Screens". "Flowers Becomes Screens" was remixed by Deepsky in 2000 as a bonus track on the album Poem.

Both "Flowers Become Screens" and "Incantation" have a music video directed by William Morrison and Paddy Gillen. The track "Flatlands" was featured on the TV series The Sentinel, in the first season episode "Vow of Silence".

== Track listing ==
1. "Flowers Become Screens" – 7:55
2. "Metaphor" – 7:47
3. "Resurrection" – 9:25
4. "Incantation" – 6:21
5. "Consensual Worlds" – 10:07
6. "Metamorphosis" – 8:26
7. "Flatlands" – 7:13
8. "Sensorium" – 12:05
9. "Gateway" – 8:05
