= Chimera (Delerium album) =

Studio album by Delerium
- Released: June 13, 2003
- Recorded: Various locations
- Genre: Electronic, pop, ambient
- Length: 68:29
- Label: Nettwerk
- Producer: Carmen Rizzo, Bill Leeb, Rhys Fulber, Ryan Greene; many others

Delerium chronology
Poem (2000)	Chimera (2003)	Nuages du Monde (2006)

Singles from Chimera
- 1. "After All" Released: June 30, 2003; 2. "Truly" Released: February 10, 2004

Chimera is the eleventh studio album by Canadian industrial/electronic music group Delerium in 2003 (see 2003 in music).

The song "Above the Clouds" was released as an iTunes online exclusive.

== Track listing ==
=== Disc one ===
1. "Love" (Zoë Johnston, Bill Leeb, Carmen Rizzo, Jamie Muhoberac) – 4:03
  - Vocals: Zoë Johnston
  - Samples: "Vision (O Euchari In Leta Via)", from The Music of Hildegard von Bingen
2. "After All" (Jaël, Leeb, Rhys Fulber) – 4:51
  - Vocals: Jaël
3. "Just a Dream" (Margaret Far, Leeb, Fulber) – 5:27
  - Vocals: Margaret Far
4. "Run for It" (Leigh Nash, Leeb, Fulber) – 4:35
  - Vocals: Leigh Nash
5. "Truly" (Nerina Pallot, Leeb, Rizzo, Muhoberac) – 4:38
  - Vocals: Nerina Pallot
6. "Serenity" (Leeb, Fulber, Chris Elliot) – 7:20
  - Samples: "Alleluia Veni Domine", traditional
7. "Touched" (Rachel Fuller) – 4:05
  - Vocals: Rachel Fuller
8. "Forever After" (Songul Akturk, Muhoberac, Leeb, Rizzo) – 4:35
  - Vocals: Sultana (Songul Akturk)
9. "Fallen" (Rani Kamal, Muhoberac, Leeb) – 3:50
  - Vocals: Rani
10. "Orbit of Me" (Nash, Leeb, Muhoberac, Rizzo, Kent Stephany) – 5:23
  - Vocals: Leigh Nash
11. "Magic" (Julee Cruise, Leeb, Rizzo, Muhoberac, Stephany) – 4:36
  - Vocals: Julee Cruise
12. "Eternal Odyssey" (Leeb, Fulber) – 9:46
  - Samples: Adagio for Strings (Agnus Dei choral arrangement), composed by Samuel Barber
13. "Returning" (Kristy Thirsk, Leeb, Fulber) – 5:14
  - Vocals: Kristy Thirsk

Many online sources, particularly databases such as Allmusic , list "Serenity Touched" as one song, as well as "Eternal Odyssey Returning". This is due to the formatting of the track list on the CD case back insert, which causes visual ambiguity (the band's MP3.com page also had tracks listed under the incorrect names).

=== Disc two ===
The contents of disc 2 vary with region: this information is for the most common North American release.

1. "Stopwatch Hearts" (Leeb, Emily Haines, Muhoberac, Rizzo) – 4:09
  - Vocals: Emily Haines
2. "After All" (Andrew Sega Remix) – 7:25
  - Music videos: "Silence", "Flowers Become Screens", "Aria"

The "Andrew Sega Remix" of "After All" was the winner of an amateur remix contest held by Nettwerk prior to the album's release.

== Charts ==
=== Weekly charts ===
Chart (2003)	Peak position
US Top Dance/Electronic Albums (Billboard)	2
US Heatseekers Albums (Billboard)	12

=== Year-end charts ===
Chart (2003)	Position
US Top Dance/Electronic Albums (Billboard)	24
