= Faces, Forms & Illusions =

Studio album by Delerium
- Released: January 6, 1989
- Genre: Electronic, ambient
- Length: 39:47
- Label: Dossier
- Producer: Bill Leeb

Delerium chronology
Faces, Forms & Illusions (1989)	Morpheus (1989)

Professional ratings
Review scores
Source	Rating
Allmusic	3/5 stars

Faces, Forms & Illusions is the debut studio album by the Canadian ambient/electronic music group Delerium that was released on January 6, 1989 on the Dossier label. The album was re-issued in 1997 on Cleopatra Records with the bonus track "Dark Star" added and "Hidden Mask" removed. All songs written by Bill Leeb, except "Monuments of Deceit" and "Mecca", which were co-written by Bill Leeb and Michael Balch.

"Hidden Mask" features samples from the song "Im Nin'alu" by Ofra Haza.

== Artwork ==
The cover features a black and yellow image of Malcolm Browne's famous photograph of the self-immolation of Thích Quảng Đức, a Vietnamese Buddhist monk, in Saigon in 1963. The monk was protesting President Ngô Đình Diệm's administration for oppressing the Buddhist religion. The photograph drew international attention and persuaded U.S. President John F. Kennedy to withdraw support for Diệm's government. In 1963, Associated Press correspondent Browne's coverage of the event earned the World Press Photo of the Year award.

== Original Track listing ==
All tracks are written by Bill Leeb, except "Monuments of Deceit" and "Mecca" co-written by Michael Balch.

Side one
No.	Title	Length
1.	"Monuments of Deceit"	4:19
2.	"Mecca"	4:22
3.	"Inside the Chamber"	6:20
4.	"Sword of Islam"	4:13

Side two
No.	Title	Length
1.	"New Dawn"	4:50
2.	"Certain Trust"	5:12
3.	"Hidden Mask"	5:15
4.	"Strange Ways"	5:16

Original CD issue
No.	Title	Length
9.	"Subvert/Wired Archives/Siege of Atrocity"	19:58

1997 Reissue (Hypnotic/Cleopatra CLP 9936-2)
No.	Title	Length
9.	"Dark Star"	10:03

2022 Remaster (Metropolis MET 1265)
No.	Title	Length
9.	"Subvert"	3:48
10.	"Wired Archives"	6:57
11.	"Siege of Atrocity"	7:45
12.	"Black Ice"	3:37
13.	"Desert"	10:39

== Personnel ==
Delerium

- Bill Leeb – instruments, production, mixing
- Rhys Fulber – instruments (9)

Production and additional personnel

- Aimee C. – design
- Michael Balch – mixing
- Wide World Photos – photography
