= Euphoric (EP) =

EP by Delerium
- Released: October 29, 1991
- Genre: Electronic, ambient, worldbeat
- Length: 35:46
- Producer: Bill Leeb, Rhys Fulber

Delerium chronology
Spiritual Archives (1991)	Euphoric (1991)	Spheres (1994)

Professional ratings
Review scores
Source	Rating
AllMusic	2/5 stars
Music from the Empty Quarter	Favorable

Euphoric is an EP by Canadian industrial/electronic music group Delerium. It was released in 1991.

== Samples ==
Euphoric features a few vocal samples from the movie From Beyond as well as a brief sample of the track "The Mission" from The Mission.

Decade features a brief sample from the "Theme from Reanimator" from the film Re-Animator.

== Track listing ==
No.	Title	Length
1.	"Euphoric"	6:53
2.	"Decade"	5:50
3.	"Grave Mentor"	15:22
4.	"Sorrow"	7:41
