= Spheres 2 =

Studio album by Delerium
- Released: September 9, 1994
- Genre: Electronic, ambient, worldbeat
- Length: 59:49
- Producer: Bill Leeb, Rhys Fulber

Delerium chronology
Semantic Spaces (1994)	Spheres 2 (1994)	Karma (1997)

Professional ratings
Review scores
Source	Rating
Allmusic	3/5 stars

Spheres 2 is the eighth studio album by Canadian industrial/electronic music group Delerium in 1994.

== Track listing ==
1. "Morphology" – 9:28
2. "TransHumanist" – 10:11
3. "Shockwave" – 8:33
4. "Dimensional Space" – 5:27
5. "Hypoxia" – 8:50
6. "Otherworld" – 4:49
7. "In Four Dimensions" – 12:31

== Other ==
- "In Four Dimensions" samples heavily from 1+2 by Recoil.
