= Soulstice (band) =

American trip-hop band

- Genres: Trip hop; downtempo; electronic; soul
- Years active: 1995–present
- Labels: Om; Uno
- Members: Gina Rene; Gabriel Rene; Mei-Lwun; Andy Caldwell

Soulstice is a downtempo/electronic soul band that is a part of the US based record label Om Records and later to Uno Recordings. The band started after a collaboration between Gabriel Rene and Andy Caldwell in 1995. The band was composed of Rene (vocals), Gabriel Rene (keyboards), Mei-Lwun (DJ turntable) and Caldwell (keyboards and producer). They are influenced by jazz, blues, neo-soul, drum and bass, hip hop, and bossa nova.

Gina and Gabriel Rene are the sister and brother of US The X Factor season 1 contestant and second runner-up Chris Rene. Caldwell has gone on to perform solo and producing artists through Uno Recordings, a music producing label that he established in 2004.

Soulstice has released three albums: Illusion (2001), its accompanying remix album Mixed Illusions (2001), and In the Light (2011).

== Discography ==
Illusion
No.	Title	Length
1.	"Illusion"
2.	"Fall into You"
3.	"Colour"
4.	"Lovely"
5.	"Andromeda"
6.	"Wind"
7.	"Surrender"
8.	"The Reason"
9.	"Not Alone"
10.	"Tenderly"
11.	"Changes"

CMJ New Music Monthly called it "tasteful and alluring, if not particularly memorable".

They released the album Mixed Illusions in 2001.

Mixed Illusions
No.	Title	Length
1.	"Lockdown"
2.	"Fall Into You (Soulstice Remix)"
3.	"Colour (Atjazz Remix)"
4.	"Fall Into You (Landslide dub)"
5.	"Tenderly (Pepe Bradock Remix)"
6.	"Lovely (Johnny Fiasco's Lovely Vocal Mix)"
7.	"Illusion (J Boogie Remix)"
8.	"The Reason (DJ Spinna Remix)"
9.	"Wind (Fila Brazilia Remix)"
10.	"Not Alone (Soulstice Drum and Space Mix)"
11.	"Fall Into You (Migue Migs Remix)"
12.	"Tenderly (Kevin Yost Remix)"

PopMatters wrote, "A nicely compiled set of remixes, Mixed Illusions will undoubtedly please fans of the original album."

After almost a decade long hiatus, the album In The Light was released on May 17, 2011.

In the Light
No.	Title	Length
1.	"Realistic"
2.	"Love Cliché"
3.	"Soul on Fire"
4.	"Alright"
5.	"Where Were You (Re-Edit)"
6.	"Interlude"
7.	"In the Light"
8.	"Lost in the City"
9.	"Goog Organ"
10.	"Wizard"
11.	"Changes (Westside Vocal Mix)"
12.	"I Believe"
13.	"Soul On Fire (Tribute to the Angel Man Mix)"
