= Morphia (disambiguation) =

Morphia, also called morphine, is a highly potent opiate analgesic drug.

Morphia may also refer to:

- Morphia (Dutch band), a doom metal music group
- Morphia of Melitene (died c. 1126), queen consort of Jerusalem
- Morphine (film) or Morfiy, a 2008 Russian film by Aleksei Balabanov, based on a 1926 short story by Mikhail Bulgakov

== Distinguish from ==
- Morphea, a skin condition with white patches

== See also ==
- Morphine (disambiguation)
