= Morpheus (disambiguation) =

Morpheus is a god associated with sleep and dreams.

Morpheus may also refer to:

== Characters ==
- Morpheus (DC comics), a moniker for Dream, a fictional personification of dreams in the comic book series The Sandman
- Morpheus (Marvel Comics), a Marvel Comics character
- Morpheus (The Matrix), a character of The Matrix franchise
- King Morpheus, a fictional character in the Little Nemo comics
- Morpheus, a minor artificial intelligence character in the game Deus Ex
- Morpheus (Percy Jackson), a character who appears in The Last Olympian
- Morpheus D. Duvall, the principal antagonist of Resident Evil: Dead Aim

== Technology ==
- Morpheus (file-sharing software), file-sharing client/server software operated by the company StreamCast Networks
- Morpheus (1987 video game), a video game developed by Andrew Braybrook in 1987
- Morpheus (1998 video game), a video game released in 1998
- Project Morpheus, a NASA project to produce a vertical test bed and pre-prototype lunar lander called Morpheus
- Project Morpheus, the codename for PlayStation VR
- Morpheus (communications system) an evolution of the British Armed Forces' Bowman communications system

== Music ==
- Morpheus (Rebecca Clarke), a composition for viola and piano by Rebecca Helferich Clarke
- Morpheus (album), a music album by Canadian group Delerium
- Morpheus, a synthesizer produced in the mid-1990s by E-mu Systems

== Other ==
- "Morpheus" (Stargate SG-1), an episode of the sci-fi TV series Stargate SG-1
- Morpheus (role-playing game), a tabletop role-playing game
- Morpheus (hotel), a hotel under construction at City of Dreams, Macau
- 4197 Morpheus, an asteroid

== See also ==
- Morfey, a Russian air defense system
