= Heaven's Earth =

Song by Delerium

Single by Delerium

from the album Karma
- Released: December 10, 1999
- Genre: Electronic, ambient, trance
- Length: 8:16 (Album Version); 3:56 (Radio Edit); 4:22 (Matt Darey Remix Edit)
- Label: Nettwerk
- Songwriters: Bill Leeb; Rhys Fulber; Kristy Thirsk
- Producer: Delerium

Delerium singles chronology
"Silence" (1999)	"Heaven's Earth" (1999)	"Innocente" (2001)

"Heaven's Earth" is the fourth single from Delerium's album Karma featuring singer Kristy Thirsk. The original version was released as a bonus track on the second disc of the album.

After the huge success of the hit single Silence this song was also released with a trance remix by Matt Darey as the main radio version. Another remix was done by Key South.

No video was made for this single.

== Track listing ==
UK CD single 1 - 2000

1. "Heaven's Earth (Matt Darey Remix Edit)" - 3:59
2. "Heaven's Earth (Key South Remix)" - 9:00
3. "Heaven's Earth (Matt Darey Remix Dub)" - 6:22

UK Cd single 2 - 2000

1. "Heaven's Earth (Matt Darey Remix)" - 8:18
2. "Heaven's Earth (Key South Remix Edit)" - 3:38
3. "Heaven's Earth (Album Version Edit)" - 3:56

Canada Matt Darey remix vinyl - 2000

1. "Heaven's Earth (Matt Darey Remix)" - 8:18
2. "Heaven's Earth (Matt Darey Remix Dub)" - 8:15
3. "Heaven's Earth (Matt Darey Remix Edit)" - 3:59

European remix vinyl - 2000

1. "Heaven's Earth (Matt Darey Remix)" - 8:18
2. "Heaven's Earth (Key South Remix)" - 9:00

Australian CD single - 2000

1. "Heaven's Earth (Matt Darey Remix Edit)" - 3:59
2. "Heaven's Earth (Key South Remix Edit)" - 3:38
3. "Heaven's Earth (Original Mix Edit)" - 3:56
4. "Heaven's Earth (Matt Darey Remix)" - 8:18
5. "Heaven's Earth (Key South Remix)" - 9:00

== Charts ==
Chart (1999–2000)	Peak position
Ireland (IRMA)	21
United Kingdom (The Official Charts Company)	44
US Billboard Hot Dance Club Play	20
