= Niels van Gogh =

German DJ and producer

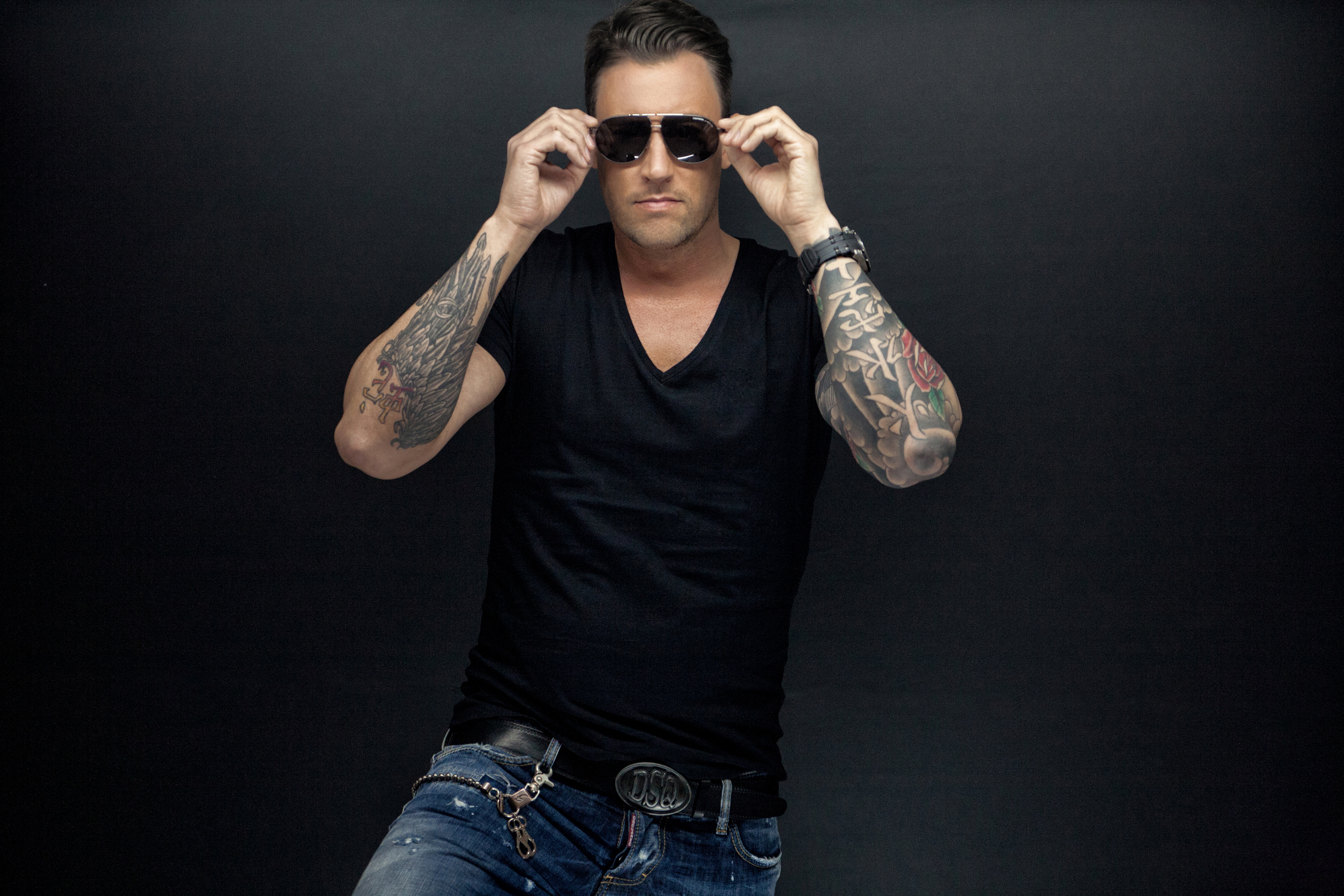

Background information
- Born: Niels van Gogh
- Origin: Augsburg, Germany
- Genres: House; electro music
- Occupations: DJ; record producer
- Years active: 1998–present
- Labels: Kosmo; Revealed; Musical Freedom; Spinnin´
- Website: nielsvangogh.de

Niels van Gogh is a DJ and producer from Augsburg. He is best known for his 1998 single "Pulverturm" which achieved gold in Belgium and South Africa and reached the Top 20 of French and Dutch Billboard charts.

== Career ==
His style is progressive clubsound. Niels van Gogh started his career in 1998 and plays in Europe and all around the world, e.g. in Ireland, Belgium, the Netherlands, Spain, Austria, Hungary, Italy, Thailand, South Africa, France, Australia among others.

“Pulverturm” (1998) was his first release on Kosmo Records. It was a hit around the world, reached gold status in Belgium and South Africa and was placed among the Top 20 of the French and Dutch Billboard Charts. Therefore, having sold over 20,000 vinyl records in Germany, Niels van Gogh was awarded the “Discomaniac” at the 2000 German Dance Awards.

“Doppelgänger” was his second release on Kosmo Records.

In 2003, Niels van Gogh signed a contract with the label Media Records. On Media Records he released the following tracks: “One Way Out”, “Don't Be Afraid of Tomorrow” and his first album No Way Out.

In 2007, Niels van Gogh released the single Pulverturm 2.0 in cooperation with Eniac. It peaked at rank 6 in the Finnish charts.

In 2008 he worked together with Thomas Gold and released another hit, a remix of "Silence" by Delerium and Sarah McLachlan.

In spring 2009, Niels van Gogh released his new Single "Dreamer" with the leading German dance music label Scream & Shout and also started his own label "Play Me Louder".

== Discography ==
=== Charted singles ===
Single	Year	Peak chart positions					Certifications	Album
Single	Year	GER	FIN	FRA	NL	UK	Certifications	Album
"Pulverturm"	1998	19	—	24	17	75	BEL: Gold; ZA: Gold	Non-album singles
"Doppelgänger"	1999	98	—	—	—	—		Non-album singles
"Another Joy"	2002	97	—	—	—	—		Non-album singles
"Pulverturm 2.0" (as Niels van Gogh vs. Eniac)	2007	—	6	—	—	—		The Remix Album

=== Other singles ===
Single	Year	Album
"Plastic"	1998	Non-album singles
"Pulverturm UK Remix"	1998	Non-album singles
"Doppelgänger Remix"	1999	Non-album singles
"Midnight"	2000	Non-album singles
"Electronic Confusion"	2001	Non-album singles
"Feeling A Pressure Fast Forward"	2003	Non-album singles
"One Way Out - Martin Eyerer Remix"	2004	No Way Out
"Don't Be Afraid of Tomorrow"	2004	No Way Out
"Don't Be Afraid of Tomorrow Remix"	2004	Non-album singles
"My Own Religion"	2005	Frequenzklang
"My Own Religion Remix"	2005	Non-album singles
"Pulverturm 2006"	2006	Non-album singles
"L.S.D."	2006	Frequenzklang
"Don't Stop / Erase & Rewind"	2006	The Remix Album
"Hate My Baby"	2007	Non-album singles
"Slamming Doors" (as Niels van Gogh vs. Eniac)	2008	Non-album singles
"Drummachine" (as Niels van Gogh & Spacekid)	2008	Non-album singles
"Integrity & Honesty" (as Niels van Gogh vs. Spacekid)	2008	We Love Electro
"On Every Fucking Weekend" (as Niels van Gogh & Carlos Mendes)	2008	Non-album singles
"Dreamer"	2009	We Love Electro II
"Far 2 Late" (as Niels van Gogh vs. Eniac)	2009	Non-album singles
"My House Is Calling" (as Niels van Gogh vs. Emilio Verdez)	2009	We Love Electro III
"Monza" (as Niels van Gogh & Daniel Strauss)	2009	We Love Electro III
"Take Me Back" (as Niels van Gogh vs. Yvan & Dan Daniel)	2009	Non-album singles
"On" (as Niels van Gogh & Armin Prayd)	2010	Non-album singles
"Black Is Black" (as Niels van Gogh vs. Emilio Verdez)	2010	We Love Electro IV
"All Bitches" (as Niels van Gogh vs. Voltaxx)	2010	We Love Electro IV
"Royal Junk" (as Niels van Gogh vs. Emilio Verdez)	2010	We Love Electro V
"Gumball" (as Niels van Gogh & Daniel Strauss)	2010	Non-album singles
"Emergency" (as Niels van Gogh & Daniel Strauss)	2011	Non-album singles
"Rambazamba" (as Niels van Gogh vs. Emilio Verdez)	2012	Non-album singles
"Espuma" (as Niels van Gogh & Daniel Strauss)	2012	Non-album singles
"Can You Feel It" (as Niels van Gogh & Daniel Strauss)	2012	Non-album singles

=== Albums ===
- 2004: No Way Out
- 2006: Frequenzklang
- 2007: The Remix Album
- 2008: All The Singles
- 2008: We Love Electro
- 2009: We Love Electro II
- 2009: We Love Electro III
- 2010: We Love Electro IV
- 2010: We Love Electro V
