= Lunik =

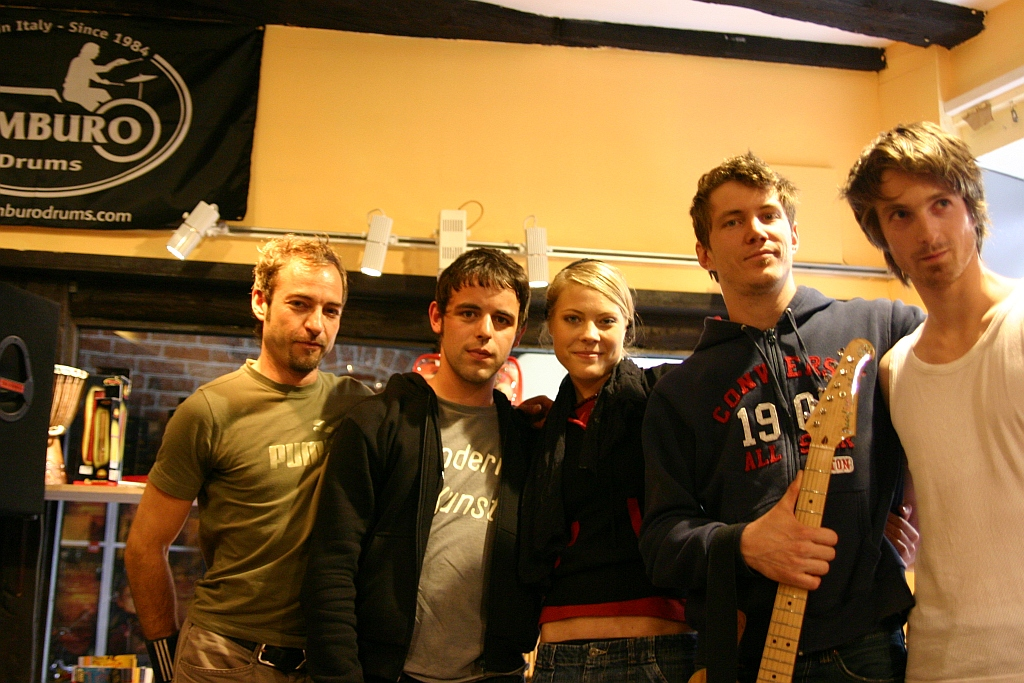
- Lunik, 2005

Background information
- Origin: Switzerland
- Genres: Trip hop (earlier material), pop rock
- Years active: 1997–2013
- Labels: EMI (1999-2005); F.O.D. (2006-2011); Sony Music Switzerland (2012-2013)
- Members: Jaël Krebs; Luk Zimmermann; Cédric Monnier
- Past members: Adi Amstutz (1997-2001); Mats Marti (Drums, 1997-2005); Jacob Suske (Bass, 2005-2008); Chrigel Bosshard (Drums, 2006-2011)
- Website: Official website

Lunik (/ˈluːnɪk/) is a band from Switzerland. There are currently three members.

Lunik started in 1997 with Adi Amstutz, Luk Zimmermann, Mats Marti, Walo Müller and Anton Höglhammer. Singer Jaël joined the band in 1998 and Anton Höglhammer left the line-up. 1999 saw the release of their debut album Rumour, recorded largely in an atmospheric trip hop style. Bassist Walo Müller left the band after the accompanying tour, and the second album Ahead (2001) saw the band steering towards a pop sound. Oli Müller supported the band as bassist in the live performances, and Adi Amstutz left the band.

The third album Weather (2003) was a huge success in Switzerland, with an acoustic approach from Jaël, Luk, and Mats replacing the electronica of the earlier albums. Cédric Monnier (keyboards) and Jacob Suske (bass) joined the band as supporting players on the acoustic tour for Weather. A live album, Life is On Our Side, appeared in 2004. Cédric Monnier and Jacob Suske joined the official line-up in 2005, and Mats Marti departed at the same time. In the beginning of 2006, Chrigel Bosshard joined Lunik as the new drummer, but left the band at the end of 2011. Jacob Suske (bass) left the band again in September 2008.

In July 2013 the band members announced that they will split up on their own solo careers. A final album with unfinished works will be released under the title "Encore". The band will also tour for one final time. In early 2014, the concert documentary Lunik – the last concert was released with footage of the farewell concert in Bern and interviews with the band members. The film was largely made possible with money from crowdfunding.

== Band members ==
=== Last line-up ===
- Jaël - vocals, rhythm-guitar
- Luk Zimmermann - lead-guitar
- Cédric Monnier - keyboards

== Discography ==
=== Studio albums ===
Year	Album details	SWI	Certifications (sales thresholds)
1999	Rumour: Released: 30 August 1999; Label: EMI Switzerland	—	—
2001	Ahead: Released: 3 March 2003; Label: EMI Switzerland	16	—
2003	Weather: Released: 8 December 2003 (Switzerland), 14 February 2005 (Europe); Label: EMI Switzerland	6	SWI: Gold
2006	Preparing to Leave: Released: 1 September 2006; Label: Sophie Records / F.O.D. Records	1	SWI: Platinum
2010	Small Lights in the Dark: Released: 12 February 2010 (Switzerland), 12 April 2010 (Europe); Label: Sophie Records / F.O.D. Records	1	SWI: Gold
2012	What is Next: Released: 12 August 2012 (Switzerland); Label: Sophie Records / Sony Music Switzerland	1	

=== Other albums ===
Year	Album details	SWI
2004	Life Is on Our Side (live album): Released: 4 October 2004 (Switzerland), 14 February 2005 (Europe); Label: EMI Switzerland	9
2009	Lonely Letters (compilation album): Released: 23 March 2009 (only outside Switzerland); Label: F.O.D. Records	—
2013	Encore: Released: TBA (Switzerland); Label: Sophie Records / Sony Music Switzerland	—

=== Singles ===
Year	Song	Peak positions		Album
Year	Song	SWI	ITA	Album
1999	"Other Side"	—	—	Rumour
1999	"Rumour"	—	—	Rumour
2001	"Static"	47	—	Ahead
2002	"Waiting"	—	—	Ahead
2003	"The Most Beautiful Song"	32	—	Globi and the Stolen Shadows OST
2003	"Through Your Eyes"	85	—	Weather
2004	"Summer's Gone"	—	—	Life Is on Our Side
2004	"The Most Beautiful Song" (reissue)	98	—	Weather
2005	"Go On"	—	—	Weather
2006	"Little Bit"	7	—	Preparing to Leave
2007	"Preparing to Leave"	86	—	Preparing to Leave
2007	"Life Is All Around You"	—	—	Preparing to Leave
2008	"Do You Love Me"	—	9	Lonely Letters
2009	"Everybody Knows"	—	15	Lonely Letters
2010	"People Hurt People"	—	—	Small Lights in the Dark
2010	"How Could I Tell You"	40	—	Small Lights in the Dark
2010	"Diary"	—	—	Small Lights in the Dark
2012	"Me-Time"	—	—	What is Next
"—" indicates the single did not chart or wasn't released in that country.

Wojtek feat. Lunik & Vida Breve - Encore un soir

- DJ Tatana feat. Jaël - Always On My Mind
  - No. 6 on Swiss Singles Chart
- Delerium feat. Jaël - After All
  - No. 9 on US Dance / Club Play Chart
- Mich Gerber feat. Jaël - You Remain
- Mich Gerber feat. Jaël - Stop Crying
- Mensano feat. Jaël - Doesn't Care
- Delerium feat. Jaël - Lost and Found
  - No. 4 on US Dance / Club Play Chart
- Schiller feat. Jaël - Tired
- Schiller feat. Jaël - I Need You
- Mensano feat. Jaël - Nowhere

== See also ==
- Jaël
