= Underwater (Delerium song) =

Song by Delerium

Single by Delerium featuring Rani

from the album Poem
- Released: November 12, 2001
- Genre: Dance
- Length: 5:31 (Album Version); 3:59 (Radio Edit); 3:50 (Above & Beyond 21st Century Mix Edit); 4:05 (Rank 1 Radio Edit)
- Label: Nettwerk
- Songwriters: Bill Leeb; Rani Kamal
- Producers: Bill Leeb, Greg Reely

Delerium singles chronology
"Innocente" (2001)	"Underwater" (2001)	"After All" (2003)

"Underwater" is a single by Canadian electronic music group Delerium, featuring Australian singer Rani Kamal (daughter of Kamahl) on vocals. It was the second single released from the album, Poem, and reached number nine on the Billboard Hot Dance Club Play chart in the U.S.

== Song ==
The album version of the song has a slow, ambient arrangement focused primarily on strings performances. Like nearly all Delerium singles to date since "Silence", the single release put greater emphasis on a number of trance remixes commissioned by Nettwerk Music Group to promote the song through club play.

Notable remixers featured on the various releases of the single include Above & Beyond, Rank 1, Hydrogen Rockers (an alias of Dirty Vegas), and Peter Luts (of Ian Van Dahl and Lasgo).

The music video for the song was directed by directors collective Twobigeyes. It was aired in two different edits, which were set to the Above & Beyond remix (the more common version) and the Rank 1 remix.

== Track listing ==
UK CD Single 1 – 2001

1. "Underwater (Above & Beyond 21st Century Mix Edit)" – 3:50
2. "Underwater (MaUVe's Dark Vocal Mix)" – 8:32
3. "Underwater (Album Version Edit)" – 3:59

UK CD Single 2 – 2001

1. "Underwater (Above & Beyond 21st Century Mix)" – 8:17
2. "Underwater (Hydrogen Rockers Vocal Mix)" – 8:15
3. "Underwater (Jim Skreech Remix Edit)" – 3:20

UK Vinyl 1 – 2001

1. "Underwater (Above & Beyond 21st Century Mix)" – 8:17
2. "Underwater (Hydrogen Rockers Vocal Mix)" – 8:15

UK Vinyl 2 – 2001

1. "Underwater (MaUVe's Dark Vocal Mix)" – 8:32
2. "Underwater (Hydrogen Rockers Dub Mix)" – 7:40
3. "Underwater (MaUVe's Reprise)" – 4:15

Benelux CD Single – 2001

1. "Underwater (Rank 1 Radio Edit)" – 4:05
2. "Underwater (Rank 1 Remix)" – 9:16

Benelux CD Maxi – 2001

1. "Underwater (Rank 1 Remix)" – 9:16
2. "Underwater (MaUVe's Dark Vocal Mix)" – 8:32
3. "Underwater (Above & Beyond 21st Century Mix)" – 8:17
4. "Underwater (Hydrogen Rockers Vocal Mix)" – 8:15
5. "Underwater (Jim Skreech Remix)" – 6:39

Spain CD Maxi – 2001

1. "Underwater (Above & Beyond 21st Century Mix Edit)" – 3:50
2. "Underwater (Above & Beyond 21st Century Mix)" – 8:17
3. "Underwater (Hydrogen Rockers Vocal Mix)" – 8:15
4. "Underwater (MaUVe's Dark Vocal Mix)" – 8:32
5. "Underwater (Jim Skreech Remix)" – 6:39
6. "Underwater (Hydrogen Rockers Dub Mix)" – 7:40
7. "Underwater (Album Version Edit)" – 3:59

German CD Maxi – 2003

1. "Underwater (Above & Beyond 21st Century Mix Edit)" – 3:50
2. "Underwater (Rank 1 Radio Edit)" – 4:08
3. "Underwater (Peter Luts Mix)" – 7:56
4. "Underwater (Above & Beyond 21st Century Mix)" – 8:17
5. "Underwater (Rank 1 Remix)" – 9:16

== Charts ==
Chart (1999–2000)	Peak position
Belgium (Ultratop 50 Flanders)	46
Belgium (Ultratip Bubbling Under Wallonia)	6
Ireland (IRMA)	48
Scottish Singles Sales (Official Charts)	28
UK Singles (Official Charts)	33
UK Dance (Official Charts)	14
UK Indie (Official Charts)	3
US Billboard Hot Dance Club Play	9
