= Days Turn into Nights =

Song by Delerium

Single by Delerium featuring Michael Logen

from the album Music Box Opera
- Released: December 18, 2012
- Genre: Electronic, dance, trance, dubstep
- Length: 6:10 (Album Version)
- Label: Nettwerk
- Songwriter(s): Bill Leeb; Rhys Fulber; Michael Logen
- Producer(s): Delerium

Delerium singles chronology
"Monarch" (2012)	"Days Turn into Nights" (2012)	"Chrysalis Heart" (2013)

"Days Turn into Nights" is the second single from Delerium's album Music Box Opera featuring singer-songwriter Michael Logen.

Remixes were made by Seven Lions, Solarstone and Andy Caldwell. The last remix is nominated for a Grammy in 2014 for "Best Remixed Recording, Non Classical".

A music video was directed by Stephen Scott. In the video dancers of the Toronto Dance Theatre can be seen.

== Track listing ==
Digital Release – 2012

1. "Days Turn into Nights (Seven Lions Remix)" – 6:07
2. "Days Turn into Nights (Andy Caldwell Remix)" – 6:25
3. "Days Turn into Nights (Solarstone Pure Mix)" – 6:35
4. "Days Turn into Nights (Album Edit)" – 4:02
5. "Days Turn into Nights (Andy Caldwell Dub Mix))" – 6:25
6. "Days Turn into Nights (Solarstone Pure Dub)" – 8:33
7. "Days Turn into Nights (Seven Lions Remix Edit)" – 3:30
8. "Days Turn into Nights (Andy Caldwell Remix Edit)" – 3:35
9. "Days Turn into Nights (Solarstone Pure Edit)" – 3:43

== Charts ==
Chart (2013)	Peak position
US Dance Club Songs (Billboard)	12
US Hot Dance/Electronic Songs (Billboard)	32
