= Innocente (Falling in Love) =

2001 single by Delerium

Single by Delerium featuring Leigh Nash

from the album Poem and The Best Of
- Released: June 19, 2001
- Genre: Electronic, trance
- Length: 6:30 (Album Version); 4:27 (Radio Edit); 3:33 (Lost Witness Remix Radio Edit); 4:20 (DJ Tiësto Remix Radio Edit)
- Label: Nettwerk
- Songwriters: Bill Leeb; Leigh Nash
- Producer: Delerium

Delerium singles chronology
"Heaven's Earth" (2000)	"Innocente (Falling in Love)" (2001)	"Underwater" (2001)

Leigh Nash singles chronology
"Need to Be Next to You" (2000)	"Innocente" (2001)	"The End of the World" (2001)

"Innocente (Falling in Love)" is the first single from Delerium's album Poem featuring singer Leigh Nash of the pop band Sixpence None the Richer.

After the huge success of the hit single "Silence" this song was also released with a trance remix by Lost Witness as the main radio version. For Belgium and Holland the remix by DJ Tiësto was used as radio version. Other official remixes were done by Mr. Sam and Deep Dish. A remix by Markus Schulz was never released officially.

A music video was also produced. It showed singer Leigh Nash walking and driving in Toronto and a few couples falling in love. Two versions were edited, one to the Lost Witness Remix and another to an edit of the DJ Tiësto Remix.

== Track listing ==
US Single - 2001

1. "Innocente" (Lost Witness Remix Radio Edit) - 3:33
2. "Innocente" (Deep Dish Gladiator Remix) - 12:00
3. "Innocente" (DJ Tiësto Remix) - 7:27
4. "Innocente" (Lost Witness Remix) - 8:32
5. "Innocente" (Mr. Sam's The Space Between Us Remix) - 10:23

UK Cd Single 1 - 2001

1. "Innocente" (Lost Witness Remix Radio Edit) - 3:33
2. "Innocente" (Deep Dish Gladiator Remix) (UK Edit) - 10:59
3. "Innocente" (Album Version Edit) - 4:27

UK Cd Single 2 - 2001

1. "Innocente" (Lost Witness Remix) - 8:32
2. "Innocente" (DJ Tiësto Remix) - 7:27
3. "Innocente" (Mr. Sam's The Space Between Us Remix Edit) - 3:55

Benelux Cd Single - 2001

1. "Innocente" (DJ Tiësto Remix Radio Edit) - 4:20
2. "Innocente" (DJ Tiësto Remix) - 7:27

Benelux Cd-Maxi - 2001

1. "Innocente" (DJ Tiësto Remix) - 7:27
2. "Innocente" (Mr. Sam's The Space Between Us Remix) - 10:23
3. "Innocente" (Deep Dish Gladiator Remix) (UK Edit) - 10:59
4. "Innocente" (Lost Witness Remix) - 8:32
5. "Innocente" (Album Version Edit) - 4:27

Australia CD-Single - 2001

1. "Innocente" (Lost Witness Remix Radio Edit) - 3:25
2. "Innocente" (Lost Witness Remix) - 8:30
3. "Innocente" (Deep Dish Gladiator Remix) (UK Edit) - 10:55
4. "Innocente" (DJ Tiësto Remix) - 7:20
5. "Innocente" (Mr. Sam's The Space Between Us Remix) - 10:15

== Charts ==
Chart (2001)	Peak position
Belgium (Ultratop 50 Flanders)	16
Belgium (Ultratop 50 Wallonia)	32
Germany (GfK)	94
Ireland (IRMA)	19
Netherlands (Dutch Top 40)	33
Scottish Singles Sales (Official Charts)	23
UK Singles (Official Charts)	32
UK Dance (Official Charts)	32
UK Indie (Official Charts)	4
US Billboard Hot Dance Club Play	3
