= Archives II =

Compilation album by Delerium
- Released: October 8, 2001 (UK); March 12, 2002 (Nettwerk)
- Recorded: Various
- Genre: Ambient, Electronic
- Length: 59:01 (CD1); 51:53 (CD2); 110:54 (total)
- Label: Nettwerk Records
- Producer: Bill Leeb and Rhys Fulber

Delerium chronology
Archives, Vol. 1 (2001)	Archives II (2001)	Odyssey: The Remix Collection (2001)

Professional ratings
Review scores
Source	Rating
Rock Sound	3.5/5 stars

Archives, Vol. 2 is a 2001 compilation album by Delerium. It was released on Nettwerk Records shortly after being released in the UK. It brings together tracks from four of their previous albums: Spiritual Archives, Spheres, Spheres 2 and Cryogenic Studio.

== Track listing ==
=== Disc one ===
==== Spiritual Archives ====
1. "Drama" – 7:36
2. "Aftermath II" – 7:34
3. "Ephemeral Passage" – 6:28
4. "Awakenings" – 8:13

==== Spheres ====
5. "Monolith" – 7:42
6. "Colony" – 7:21
7. "Dark Matter" – 7:29
8. "Cloud Barrier" – 6:38

=== Disc two ===
==== Spheres 2 ====
1. "Morphology" – 8:50
2. "Transhumanist" – 10:11
3. "Shockwave" – 7:04
4. "Dimensional Space" – 5:26
5. "Hypoxia" – 8:09
6. "Otherworld" – 3:49

==== Cryogenic Studios ====
7. "Infra Stellar" – 8:16
