= Nuages du Monde =

Studio album by Delerium
- Released: October 3, 2006
- Genre: Electronic, pop, ambient
- Length: 57:32
- Label: Nettwerk

Delerium chronology
Chimera (2003)	Nuages du Monde (2006)	Music Box Opera (2012)

Singles from Nuages du Monde
- 1. "Angelicus" Released: December 7, 2006; 2. "Lost and Found" Released: May 2007

Professional ratings
Review scores
Source	Rating
Allmusic	link
Blogcritics	link
Release	(8/10) link

Nuages du Monde is the twelfth studio album by Canadian new age/electronic music group Delerium in 2006.

The title is French, and translates to "Clouds of the World".

== Track listing ==
1. "Angelicus" (featuring Isabel Bayrakdarian) – 5:10
2. "Extollere" (featuring Katharine Blake and Mediæval Bæbes) – 5:32
3. "The Way You Want It to Be" (featuring Zoë Johnston) – 4:52
4. "Indoctrination" (featuring Kiran Ahluwalia) – 5:26
5. "Self-Saboteur" (sometimes titled "Self-Sabateur") (featuring Kristy Thirsk) – 4:24
6. "Tectonic Shift" – 7:11
7. "Lumenis" (featuring Isabel Bayrakdarian) – 6:45
8. "Fleeting Instant" (featuring Kirsty Hawkshaw) – 4:06
9. "Sister Sojourn Ghost" (featuring Katharine Blake and Mediæval Bæbes) – 4:52
10. "Lost and Found" (featuring Jaël) – 4:06
11. "Apparition" – 5:04

== Singles ==
"Angelicus", the lead single, was released only as a promotional single in 2007; Its release to DJs enabled the track to reach number one on the U.S. Hot Dance Club Play chart during the week ending March 31, 2007. A music video was also filmed and released, despite the lack of a commercial single release.

1. "Angelicus" (Andy Moor full length mix)
2. "Angelicus" (Morgan Page remix)
3. "Angelicus" (Redanka remix)
4. "Angelicus" (Panoptica remix)
5. "Angelicus" (Andy Moor radio edit)
6. "Angelicus" (album version)

The second single, "Lost and Found", was also promotional and was released later in 2007. It has reached number four on the Hot Dance Club Play chart as of the week ending August 25, 2007. A music video was also filmed for the song.

1. "Lost and Found" (DJ Dan club mix) – 8:57
2. "Lost and Found" (Jaded Alliance club mix) – 7:00
3. "Lost and Found" (Blank & Jones Late Night remix) – 6:03
4. "Lost and Found" (Blank & Jones Electrofied remix) – 9:41
5. "Lost and Found" (DJ Dan radio edit) – 3:09
6. "Lost and Found" (Blank & Jones radio remix) – 3:31
7. "Lost and Found" (DJ Dan dub mix) – 8:51
