= Karma (Delerium album) =

Studio album by Delerium
- Released: April 22, 1997
- Recorded: Various locations
- Genres: Electronic, worldbeat, ambient
- Length: 72:48
- Label: Nettwerk
- Producers: Bill Leeb, Rhys Fulber

Delerium chronology
| Spheres 2 (1994) | Karma (1997) | Poem (2000) |

Singles from Karma
- 1. "Euphoria (Firefly)" Released: April 22, 1997; 2. "Duende" Released: September 23, 1997; 3. "Silence" Released: June 14, 1999; 4. "Heaven's Earth" Released: December 10, 1999

Karma is the ninth studio album by Canadian industrial/electronic music group Delerium.

Guest musicians on the album include Sarah McLachlan ("Silence"), Lisa Gerrard ("Forgotten Worlds"), Kristy Thirsk ("Enchanted", "Lamentation", "Wisdom", "'Til The End Of Time"), Jacqui Hunt ("Euphoria (Firefly)"), Greg Reely, and Camille Henderson ("Duende").

The album took around a year to record and assemble. Gregorian chants were recorded especially for the project; according to Bill Leeb, it was less expensive to hire a 30-piece choir, rent a West-Vancouver church, move the equipment and record the chants live than to pay for the rights to sample existing recordings.

== Release ==
The duo's collaboration with McLachlan, "Silence", became the band's biggest hit single. The song "Window to Your Soul" is featured in season four of Buffy the Vampire Slayer in episode 13 "The I in Team". The song "Remembrance" is featured in the beginning of the episode "Love Kills". In season 3 of the show "The sentinel".

The single "Duende", featuring singer Camille Henderson, was released on September 23, 1997. It wasn't included on Delerium's Best Of collection. The chants heard in the song were sampled from the album Heart of the Forest performed by The Baka Forest Pygmies and taken from the CD Ritual Music of the Kayapo-Xirin, Brazil. The remixes of the song were done by Emily and Dreamlogic, while the music video was made and directed by William Morrison.

== Critical reception ==
Professional ratings
Review scores
| Source | Rating |
|---|---|
| AllMusic | 4/5 stars |
| Ennui | 8.5/10 |
| Outburn | Favourable |
| RPM | Favourable |
| Satan Stole My Teddybear | Favourable |
| Sputnikmusic | 4.5/5 stars |

According to John Chedsey of Satan Stole My Teddybear, the electronic sounds on Karma are "airy, slightly cosmic and soothing", the vocals are light and soaring, and the album is "a very pleasant, unobtrusive listen". Octavia of magazine Outburn called the album "an impressive combination of technological manipulation and human touch that will bring you a moody and complex energy".

== Track listing ==
=== Disc one ===
1. "Enchanted" (feat. Kristy Thirsk) – 8:30
2. "Duende" (feat. Camille Henderson) – 5:22
3. "Twilight" – 6:05
4. "Silence" (feat. Sarah McLachlan) – 6:33
5. "Forgotten Worlds" (feat. Lisa Gerrard) – 7:32
6. "Lamentation" (feat. Kristy Thirsk) – 8:33
7. "Euphoria (Firefly)" (feat. Jacqui Hunt) – 5:27
8. "Remembrance" – 7:28
9. "Wisdom" (feat. Kristy Thirsk) – 4:48
10. "Koran" – 10:04 (replaced with a shortened 9:25 edit of "Window to Your Soul" on reissues)
11. "'Til the End of Time" (feat. Kristy Thirsk) – 4:36

The track "'Til the End of Time" contains a sample of Tori Amos' "Caught a Lite Sneeze".

=== Disc two (US release) ===
1. "Heaven's Earth" (feat. Kristy Thirsk) – 8:11
2. "Window to Your Soul" – 9:55

(Enhanced CD with pictures and videos as well as the CD audio tracks.)

=== Disc two (Australian release) ===
1. "Silence (Sanctuary Mix)" (feat. Sarah McLachlan) – 11:12
2. "Euphoria (Firefly) (Rabbit in the Moon's Divine Gothic Disco Mix)" (feat. Jacqui Hunt) – 9:16
3. "Flowers Become Screens (Frequency Modulation Mix)" (feat. Kristy Thirsk) – 7:57
4. "Incantation (12" Mix Edit)" (feat. Kristy Thirsk) – 8:55
5. "Duende (Bleak Desolation mix)" (feat. Camille Henderson) – 7:54
6. "Heaven's Earth" (feat. Kristy Thirsk) – 8:09

== Charts ==
| Chart (1999) | Peak position |
|---|---|
| Australian Albums (ARIA Charts) | 56 |
| Canada Top Albums/CDs (RPM) | 42 |

== Certifications ==
Certifications and sales for Karma
| Region | Certification | Certified units/sales |
|---|---|---|
| Canada (Music Canada) | Gold | 50,000^{^} |
^{^} Shipments figures based on certification alone.
