= Morpheus (album) =

Studio album by Delerium
- Released: July 21, 1989
- Genre: Electronic, ambient, industrial
- Length: 53:25
- Label: Dossier
- Producer: Rhys Fulber, Bill Leeb

Delerium chronology
Faces, Forms & Illusions (1989)	Morpheus (1989)	Syrophenikan (1990)

Professional ratings
Review scores
Source	Rating
Allmusic	4.5/5 stars

Morpheus is the second studio album by Canadian industrial/electronic music group Delerium in 1989.

== Track listing ==
All tracks are written by Rhys Fulber and Bill Leeb

Original LP
No.	Title	Length
1.	"Gaza"	5:08
2.	"Requiem"	5:07
3.	"Morpheus"	4:54
4.	"Faith"	4:40
5.	"Coup de Tat"	4:40
6.	"Veracity"	3:54
7.	"Temple of Light"	5:36
8.	"Somnolent"	4:33

Original CD bonus tracks (Dossier DCD 9010)
No.	Title	Length
9.	"Allurance"	4:18
10.	"Fragments of Fear"	5:17

1997 reissue bonus tracks (Hypnotic/Cleopatra CLP 9938-2)
No.	Title	Length
9.	"Allurance"	4:18
10.	"Fragments of Fear"	5:17
11.	"Symbolism"	8:47

2022 remaster bonus tracks (Metropolis MET 1266)
No.	Title	Length
9.	"Allurance"	4:18
10.	"Fragments of Fear"	5:17
11.	"Symbolism"	8:47
12.	"Brave"	2:39
13.	"Waves"	2:29
14.	"Mirrors"	7:31
15.	"Embryo"	4:16

== Personnel ==
Delerium

- Rhys Fulber – instruments, production
- Bill Leeb – instruments, production

Production and additional personnel

- Carylann Loeppky – photography
- Anthony Valcic – mixing
