= Delerium =

Canadian electronic music duo

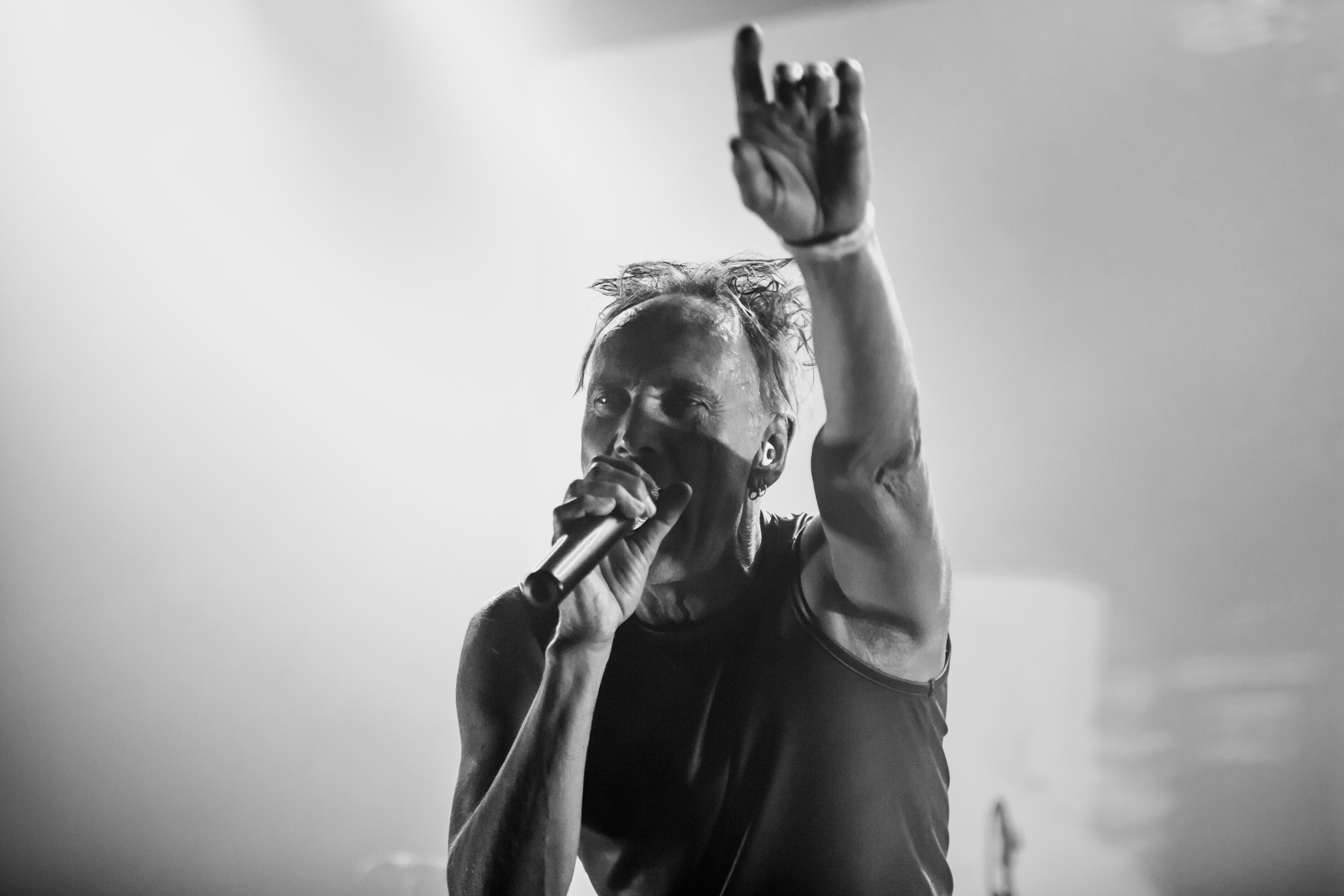
- Delerium founder Bill Leeb in 2016

Background information
- Origin: Vancouver, British Columbia, Canada
- Genres: New-age; electronic; worldbeat; trance; ambient house; dark ambient
- Years active: 1987–present
- Labels: Dossier; Third Mind; Nettwerk
- Spinoff of: Front Line Assembly
- Members: Bill Leeb; Rhys Fulber
- Past members: Michael Balch; Chris Peterson

Delerium is a Canadian new-age ambient electronic musical duo that formed in 1987, originally as a side project of the influential industrial music act Front Line Assembly. Throughout the band's history, their musical style has encompassed a broad range, including dark ethereal ambient trance, voiceless industrial soundscapes, and electronic pop music. They are best known for their worldwide hit "Silence". The band is known to feature female guest vocalists on their albums since their 1994 album Semantic Spaces.

== Members and history ==
Delerium has traditionally been a two-person project, but the only constant member throughout its history has been Bill Leeb. Leeb was an early member of industrial music pioneers Skinny Puppy, but after he left in 1986 he went on to create his own project, Front Line Assembly, with collaborator Michael Balch. Later, the two worked on the side project Delerium and released their first album, Faces, Forms & Illusions. After Balch left both Front Line Assembly and Delerium, Leeb worked with Rhys Fulber, and the two released several albums under the Delerium moniker; these years saw a gradual stylistic change from darker ambient to a more danceable sound. After the release of Karma, Fulber left to pursue other interests, and Leeb teamed up with producer Chris Peterson to release Poem. 2003, however, saw the reunion of Leeb and Fulber for the release of Chimera, followed by Nuages du Monde in 2006.

In contrast to Leeb and collaborators' other projects, Delerium has included several guest vocalists since the release of Semantic Spaces. These have included mostly women, such as Kristy Thirsk (of Rose Chronicles), Sarah McLachlan, Leigh Nash (of Sixpence None the Richer), Elsieanne Caplette (of Elsiane), Lisa Gerrard (sampled only), Jaël (of Swiss band Lunik), Camille Henderson, Nerina Pallot, Emily Haines (of Metric), Jacqui Hunt (of Single Gun Theory), Isabel Bayrakdarian and Shelley Harland. Other than Leeb, only three males have contributed vocals to a Delerium album: Matthew Sweet ("Daylight", on Poem), Greg Froese ("Apparition", on Nuages du Monde), and Michael Logen ("Days Turn into Nights", on Music Box Opera); in addition, the noted griot Baaba Maal was sampled ("Awakenings, on "Spiritual Archives").

The Mediæval Bæbes provided the vocal track for, and starred in the video of, Aria; the vocals are an adapted version of the vocals from "All Turns to Yesterday" on the Bæbes' Worldes Blysse album. They are also featured on two tracks from Delerium's 2006 album, Nuages du Monde.

In addition to these two mainstays, related collaborations between Leeb and Fulber, Peterson, and/or Balch include Equinox, Intermix, Noise Unit, Pro-Tech, and Synæsthesia, among others. In addition, in 2007 Leeb and Fulber collaborated with Leigh Nash under the name Fauxliage. Rhys Fulber has also maintained a solo project Conjure One since his temporary exit from Delerium.

== Music ==
"Silence"
30-second sample

The single "Silence", featuring vocals by Sarah McLachlan, reached number three on the UK music charts. In 2000, three years after Karma was released, notable DJs such as Tiësto and Airscape produced remixes of "Silence", which generated interest and gained considerable radio airplay for the original track, albeit most airplay was for the remixes.

In 2003, Delerium embarked on their first tour, with vocals performed by Kristy Thirsk and Shelley Harland. In January 2005, Delerium performed at the One World benefit concert in Vancouver for the 2004 Asian tsunami, where "Silence" was performed live for the first time with Sarah McLachlan. The song has been described as one of the greatest trance songs of all time.

== Awards ==
Delerium has received two Juno Awards for Best Dance Recording: in 1998 for "Euphoria (Rabbit in the Moon Mix)", and in 2000 for "Silence".

== Discography ==
=== Albums / EPs ===
- Faces, Forms & Illusions (Dossier, 1989), LP / CD
- Morpheus (Dossier, 1989), LP / CD
- Syrophenikan (Dossier, 1990), LP / CD
- Stone Tower (Dossier, 1991), LP / CD
- Spiritual Archives (Dossier, 1991), CD
- Euphoric (Third Mind, 1991), EP / CD
- Spheres (Dossier, 1994), CD
- Semantic Spaces (Nettwerk, 1994), CD (August 23)
- Spheres 2 (Dossier, 1994), CD
- Karma (Nettwerk, 1997), LP / CD (April 22)
- Poem (Nettwerk, 2000), LP / CD (November 21)
- Chimera (Nettwerk, 2003), CD (June 24)
- Nuages du Monde (Nettwerk, 2006), CD (October 3)
- Music Box Opera (Nettwerk, 2012), CD (October 30)
- Mythologie (Metropolis Records, 2016), LP/CD (September 23)
- Signs (Metropolis Records, 2023), LP/CD (March 10)
- Exaudire (releases January 15, 2027)

=== Singles ===
| Year | Single | Peak chart positions | | | | | | | | | | Album |
| Year | Single | AUS | BEL (FL) | BEL (WA) | CAN | GER | IRE | NOR | NLD | UK | US Dance | Album |
|---|---|---|---|---|---|---|---|---|---|---|---|---|
| 1994 | "Flowers Become Screens" | — | — | — | — | — | — | — | — | — | — | Semantic Spaces |
| 1994 | "Incantation" | — | — | — | — | — | — | — | — | — | — | Semantic Spaces |
| 1997 | "Euphoria (Firefly)" (featuring Jacqui Hunt) | — | — | — | — | — | — | — | — | — | — | Karma |
| 1997 | "Duende" | — | — | — | — | — | — | — | — | — | — | Karma |
| 1999 | "Silence" (featuring Sarah McLachlan) | 6 | — | — | — | — | 1 | — | 33 | 73 | — | Karma |
| 2000 | "Heaven's Earth" | — | — | — | — | — | 21 | — | — | 44 | 20 | Karma |
| 2000 | "Silence" (reissue) (featuring Sarah McLachlan) | — | 5 | 2 | 5 | 16 | 6 | 15 | 7 | 3 | 6 | Karma |
| 2001 | "Innocente (Falling in Love)" (featuring Leigh Nash) | — | 16 | 32 | — | 94 | 19 | — | 33 | 32 | 3 | Poem |
| 2002 | "Underwater" (featuring Rani) | — | 46 | 56 | — | — | 48 | — | — | 33 | 9 | Poem |
| 2003 | "After All" (featuring Jaël) | — | — | — | — | — | — | — | — | 46 | 9 | Chimera |
| 2003 | "Run for It" (featuring Leigh Nash) | — | — | — | — | — | — | — | — | — | — | Chimera |
| 2004 | "Truly" (featuring Nerina Pallot) | — | — | — | — | — | — | — | — | 54 | 2 | Chimera |
| 2004 | "Silence 2004" (featuring Sarah McLachlan) | — | — | — | — | — | 27 | — | — | 38 | 1 | The Best of |
| 2007 | "Angelicus" (featuring Isabel Bayrakdarian) | — | — | — | — | — | — | — | — | — | 1 | Nuages du Monde |
| 2007 | "Lost and Found" (featuring Jaël) | — | — | — | — | — | — | — | — | — | 4 | Nuages du Monde |
| 2008 | "Silence 2008" (featuring Sarah McLachlan) | — | 12 | 9 | — | 87 | — | — | 48 | 127 | — | Closer: The Best of Sarah McLachlan |
| 2009 | "Dust in Gravity" (featuring Kreesha Turner) | — | — | — | — | — | — | — | — | — | 1 | Remixed: The Definitive Collection |
| 2012 | "Monarch" (featuring Nadina) | — | — | — | — | — | — | — | — | — | 33 | Music Box Opera |
| 2012 | "Days Turn into Nights" (featuring Michael Logen) | — | — | — | — | — | — | — | — | — | 12 | Music Box Opera |
| 2013 | "Chrysalis Heart" (featuring Stef Lang) | — | — | — | — | — | — | — | — | — | — | Music Box Opera |
| 2015 | "Glimmer" (featuring Emily Haines) | — | — | — | — | — | — | — | — | — | — | Rarities & B-sides |
| 2016 | "Ritual" (featuring Phildel) | — | — | — | — | — | — | — | — | — | — | Mythologie |
| 2018 | "Stay" (featuring JES) | — | — | — | — | — | — | — | — | — | — | Mythologie |
| 2023 | "Falling Back to You" (featuring Mimi Page) | — | — | — | — | — | — | — | — | — | — | Signs |
"—" indicates the single did not chart or was not released in given territory

=== Compilations ===
- Reflections I (Dossier, 1995), CD
- Reflections II (Dossier, 1995), CD
- Archives I (Nettwerk, 2002), 2CD
- Archives II (Nettwerk, 2002), 2CD
- Odyssey: The Remix Collection (Nettwerk, 2001), 2CD
- The Best Of (Nettwerk, 2004), CD
- Remixed: The Definitive Collection (Nettwerk, 2010), CD
- Voice (An Acoustic Collection) (Nettwerk, 5 Oct. 2010) CD
- Rarities & B-Sides (Nettwerk, 21 April 2015)

=== Online exclusive ===
- "Above the Clouds" (2003), a download-only song featuring Shelley Harland available through iTunes Music Store and other Digital music stores

=== Music videos ===
- "Flowers Become Screens" (1994)
- "Incantation" (1994)
- "Euphoria (Firefly)" (1997)
- "Duende" (1997)
- "Silence" (Airscape Mix) (2000)
- "Underwater" (Rank 1 Remix) (2000)
- "Aria" (2000)
- "Innocente" (Lost Witness Remix) (2001)
- "Underwater" (Above & Beyond's 21st Century Remix) (2002)
- "After All" (2003)
- "After All" (Svenson & Gielen Edit) (2003)
- "Angelicus" (2007)
- "Lost and Found" (2007)
- "Dust in Gravity" (2009)
- "Dust in Gravity (Sultan & Ned Shepard Remix)" (2009)
- "Monarch" (2012)
- "Days Turn into Nights" (2013)
- "Chrysalis Heart" (2013)
- "Glimmer" (2015)
- "Stay" (2018)
- "In the Deep" (2023)

=== Remixes ===
- Tara MacLean – "Divided" (2000)
- Sarah Brightman – "A Whiter Shade of Pale" (2001)
- Sasha Lazard – "Awakening" (2002)
- Clint Mansell – "Requiem for a Dream Soundtrack - Deluxed" (2002)
- Lunik – "Waiting" (2003)
- Phildel – "Comfort Me" (2013)

=== Third-party compilations that include Delerium ===
- Space Daze: The History & Mystery of Electronic Ambient Space Rock (Cleopatra, 1994), 2CD (featured the song "Dark Matter" from the album Spheres).
- The Crow: Stairway to Heaven, 1998 (featured the song "Silence" in one episode).
- Brokedown Palace Soundtrack (Island, 1999), CD (prominently featured "Silence").
- Tomb Raider Soundtrack (Elektra / Wea, 2001), CD (featured a slightly stripped "Lara's Mix" of "Terra Firma").
- Best of Mystera (Polys, 2000), 2CD
- Doctor Death's Volume IV: The Marvels of Insect Life (C'est la Mort, 1990) CD (featured the song "A Certain Trust").
- Faeries: A Musical Companion to the Art of Brian Froud (RCA, 2002) CD (featured the song "Nature's Kingdom").

== See also ==
- Fauxliage — a musical project made by members of the Canadian electronic music group Delerium and Leigh Nash in 2007.
- List of ambient music artists
- List of artists who reached number one on the U.S. dance chart
