= Jaël =

Swiss musician (born 1979)

Jaël (Jael)
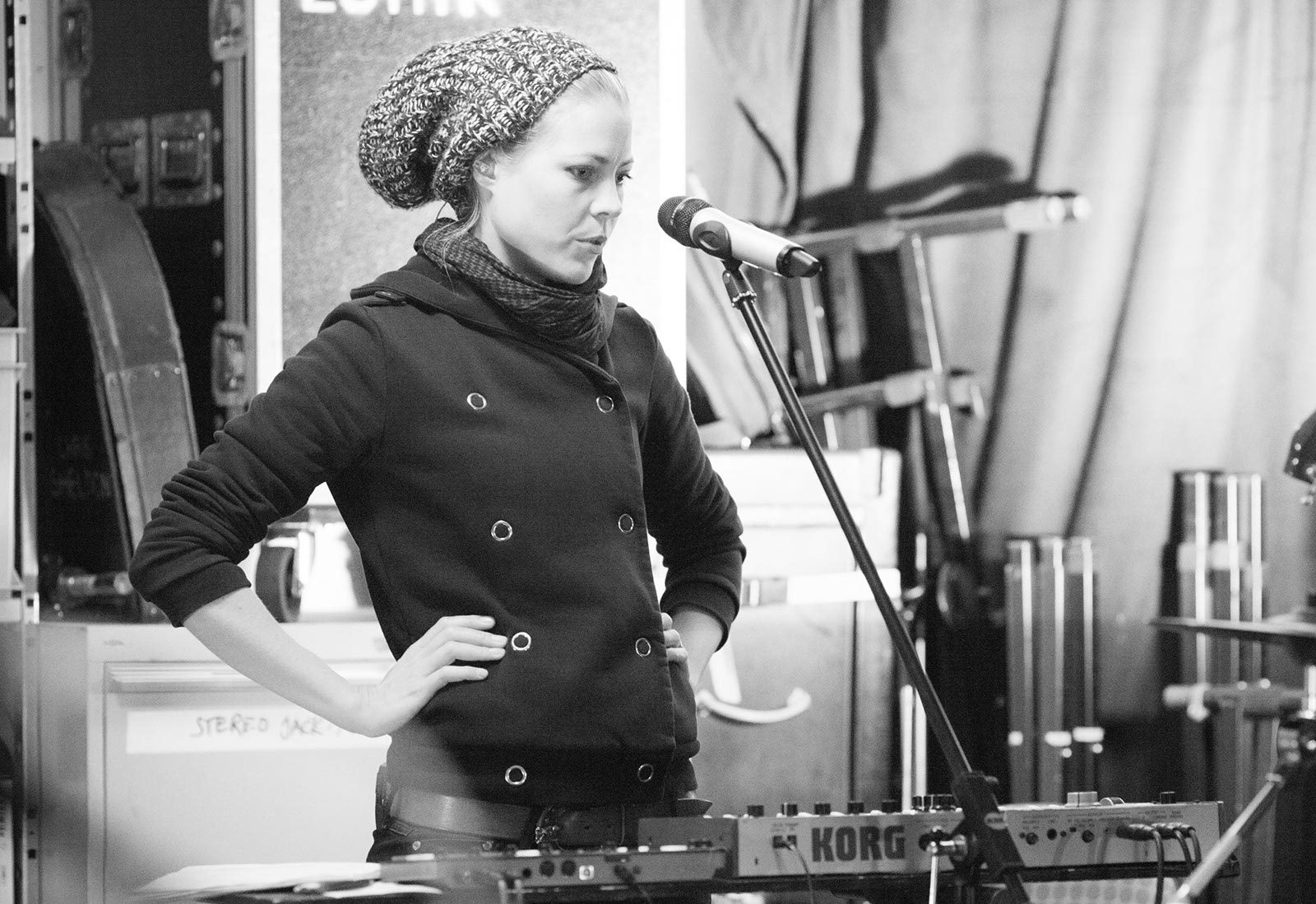
- 2015 – Jaël in the studio for "Shuffle The Cards"

Background information
- Born: Rahel Krebs; 19 August 1979 (age 46); Bern, Switzerland
- Origin: Switzerland
- Genres: Indie pop, dream pop, trip hop, electronic music, alternative rock, rock,
- Occupations: Musician, singer
- Years active: 1997–present
- Labels: Virgin, EMI, Silver Sonic, Sophie
- Website: www.jaelmusic.ch

Jaël (aka Jaël Malli; born Rahel Krebs; 19 August 1979 in Bern, Switzerland) is a Swiss musician who was the frontwoman and lead singer of the band Lunik from 1998 to 2013 and is again since their reunion in 2025.

She worked several times with Delerium, co-writing, and singing "After All" on their album Chimera, "Lost and Found" on their album Nuages du Monde, and "Light Your Light" on their 2012 album Music Box Opera. She is both internationally famous in the trance music community as well as domestically famous from her work in Lunik. The origin of her pseudonym is that she had trouble pronouncing her real name correctly as a child.

Jaël also featured on DJ Tatana's 2004 single "Always on My Mind", which had moderate chart success in Switzerland upon its release. She can also be heard in two tracks ("You Remain" and "Stop Crying") on Mich Gerber's 2004 album Tales of the Wind and on the 2008 release Sehnsucht from Schiller on the track "Tired".

After Lunik disbanded, she wrote and released several albums under her own name Jaël, with some reaching Top10-status in Switzerland.

== Collaborations ==
- Delerium
  - "After All" on Chimera (2003; co-writing and vocals)
  - "Lost and Found" on Nuages du Monde (2007; vocals)
  - "Light Your Light" on Music Box Opera (2012; vocals)
  - "Keep on Dreaming" on Mythologie (2016; vocals)
- DJ Tatana
  - "Always on My Mind" (2004; vocals)
- Mich Gerber
  - "You Remain" on Tales of the Wind (2004; vocals)
  - "Stop Crying" on Tales of the Wind (2004; vocals)
- Schiller
  - "Tired" on Sehnsucht (2008; vocals)

== See also ==
- Lunik
