= Kristy Thirsk =

- Origin: Canada
- Occupation: Singer-songwriter
- Labels: Nettwerk

Kristy Thirsk is a platinum-selling Canadian singer-songwriter best known for her work with Delerium.

== Rose Chronicles ==
Thirsk was the singer and a co-writer for the band Rose Chronicles, which was signed to Nettwerk in the 1990s. Rose Chronicles released two full-length albums: Shiver (1994), which won a Juno Award for Best Alternative Album, and Happily Ever After (1996). The band split up in 1997.

== Collaborations ==
In the years that followed, Thirsk was featured as a guest vocalist and co-writer on albums by Delerium and Balligomingo. She sang the vocals in Front Line Assembly's cover of Madonna's "Justify My Love" and Mystery Machine's cover of Blondie's "Heart of Glass."

According to Thirsk, in an Auralgasms interview, Garrett Schwarz allegedly borrowed samples from her Delerium song, "Incantation" and then released his own song on the Balligomingo album, Beneath The Surface. This, she explained, was the reason she discontinued any further collaboration with Schwarz.

Thirsk was also involved in the initial stages of Adrian White's side project Silent Alarm. The Sleepthief album The Dawnseeker, released June 2006, features Thirsk's vocals in the songs "Sublunar (Sweet Angel)". Sleepthief's follow-up The Chauffeur – The Remix – EP features Thirsk on "Send Me an Angel", a remake of the Scorpions' 1990 power ballad. She also sings on "Overkill" for the D:Fuse & Mike Hiratzka album Skyline Lounge (July 2007).

Thirsk and fellow Delerium singer Shelley Harland were the two lead vocalists for Delerium's first US tour in 2003. She toured again as the singer with Delerium's European Tour in May 2008, playing in London, Antwerp, Budapest, Prague, Munich, Frankfurt, Berlin, Athens, Thessaloniki, and Moscow.

== Solo career ==
Thirsk's first released solo track was "Bounds of Love", which was on the soundtrack of the movie Kissed in 1997. This song received a Genie Award nomination for Best Movie Theme.

She worked on her own material throughout this period and released her first full-length solo album, Souvenir, in 2003. Souvenir was produced by Eric Rosse (Tori Amos, Lisa Marie Presley).

In May 2008, Thirsk released a limited edition 4-song EP called Under Cover EP with the songs "Hourglass", "Conspiracy", "What If I", and a cover of Prince's "When Doves Cry" that features exclusive mixes of the four songs that will also be on her upcoming solo album. The EP was sold on the tour only and online.

Her song "Out There" was released on the Sirènes compilation album in May 2008. Kristy designated the song as the theme song for Red Cross Canada in January 2005, in response to the 2004 Great Sumatra-Andaman earthquake/Asian tsunami in the Indian Ocean. Kristy also co-wrote and sang vocals "Black Flowers" from Matt Darey's Urban Astronauts project. This song was a single and club hit in the UK.

== Discography ==
=== Kristy Thirsk ===
Year	Title	Label	Type	Notes
1995	Lit from Within	Nettwerk	Compilation	Features exclusive track "Songbird".
1995	Slow Brew	Nettwerk	Compilation	Features exclusive track "Songbird (Remix)".
1997	Kissed Motion Picture Soundtrack	Nettwerk	Soundtrack	Features exclusive track "Bounds of Love". Kristy is also featured on the movie's score.
2000	Bootlegs	Self-Released	E.P.	Features demos and live tracks. Released to support Kristy's west coast tour. Only 200 copies were made.
2001	Ready For Radio! Music West 2001	Nettwerk	Compilation	Features exclusive track "Over It". Released to promote the New Music West Festival 2001.
2003	Souvenir	Pretty Noise	Studio Album	Produced by Eric Rosse.
2004	Souvenir	Pretty Noise/Maple Music	Studio Album	Produced by Eric Rosse. Includes bonus track, a re-recorded version of "Over It"
2008	Under Cover	Self-Released	E.P.	Physical copies available exclusively on Delerium’s 2008 European tour. Collaboration with Mike Hiratzka.
2008	Sirènes: The Beauty of the Female Voice	Spectacle Entertainment	Compilation	Features exclusive track "Out There".
2010	Beauty 2	Neurodisc	Compilation	Features exclusive track "Fading Light".
2014	Phoenix	Self-Released	Studio Album	Features "Mistake", "Little Soldier", "Hourglass", "Bandage", "Poison", "Torture", "Conspiracy", "Break Me", "Lit", "Fading Light", "Phoenix", and "Pulse". Collaboration with Mike Hiratzka.

=== Guest appearances ===
Year	Artist	Title	Label	Type	Notes
1994	Delerium	Semantic Spaces	Nettwerk	Studio Album	Kristy is featured on "Flowers Become Screens", "Incantation" and "Flatlands".
1994	Delerium	"Flowers Become Screens"	Nettwerk	CD Single	–
1994	Delerium	"Incantation"	Nettwerk	CD Single	–
1995	Mystery Machine	Ten Speed	Nettwerk	Studio Album	Kristy is featured on "Chihuahua". Some copies of this album feature a cover of Blondie's "Heart of Glass", which also features Kristy.
1995	Mystery Machine	"Heart of Glass"	Nettwerk	7" Single	Limited edition single featuring Kristy singing lead.
1997	Delerium	Karma	Nettwerk	Studio Album	Kristy is featured on "Enchanted", "Lamentation", "Wisdom", "’Til the End of Time" and "Heaven's Earth".
1999	Front Line Assembly	Virgin Voices Volume 1 - A Tribute to Madonna	Cleopatra/Eagle Records	Compilation	Kristy is featured on "Justify My Love". The song was supposed to be credited to Delerium, but due to contractual problems, the song is credited to another of Bill Leeb and Rhys Fulber's projects, Front Line Assembly.
2001	Delerium	"Heaven's Earth"	Nettwerk	CD Single	–
2002	Balligomingo	Beneath the Surface	Windham Hill	Studio Album	Kristy is featured on "Heat".
2003	Delerium	Chimera	Nettwerk	Studio Album	Kristy is featured on "Returning".
2003	James Divine	Intervention	–	Studio Album	Kristy is featured on "Sun Moon Stars" and "Catch Me". James Divine is the pseudonym of Kristy's brother J.T. James.
2004	Delerium	The Best of Delerium	Nettwerk	Studio Album	Compilation featuring "Flowers Become Screens" and "Incantation".
2006	Delerium	Nuages du Monde	Nettwerk	Studio Album	Kristy is featured on "Self-Saboteur".
2006	Sleepthief	The Dawnseeker	Neurodisc	Studio Album	Kristy is featured on "Sublunar (Sweet Angel)".
2007	Sleepthief	The Chauffeur EP	Neurodisc	E.P.	Kristy is featured on "Send Me an Angel".
2007	D:Fuse & Mike Hiratzka	Skyline Lounge	Lost Angeles Recordings	Studio Album	Kristy is featured on "Overkill".
2009	Sleepthief	Labyrinthine Heart	Neurodisc	Studio Album	Kristy is featured on "A Cut from the Fight" and "Reversals".
2010	Delerium	Voice	Nettwerk	EP	Kristy is featured on re-recorded versions of "Flowers Become Screens" and "Self-Saboteur".
2010	Matt Darey	Nocturnal	Black Hole Recordings	Studio Album	Kristy is featured singing "Black Flowers" on Matt Darey's Urban Astronauts project.
2012	Delerium	Music Box Opera	Nettwerk	Studio Album	Kristy is featured as a guest vocalist on "The Sky" and "Lock Down".
2015	Delerium	Rarities & B-Sides	Nettwerk	Compilation	Kristy is featured as a guest vocalist on "Ray".
2015	Conjure One	Holoscenic	Armada Music Bundles	Studio Album	Kristy is featured as a guest vocalist on "Ghost".
