= Poem (album) =

Studio album by Delerium
- Released: November 22, 2000
- Recorded: Various locations
- Genres: Electronic, pop, ambient
- Length: 72:19
- Label: Nettwerk
- Producers: Bill Leeb, Greg Reely, Chris Peterson

Delerium chronology
Karma (1997)	Poem (2000)	Chimera (2003)

Singles from Poem
- 1. "Innocente" Released: June 19, 2001; 2. "Underwater" Released: November 12, 2001

Professional ratings
Review scores
Source	Rating
Allmusic	link

Poem is the tenth studio album released by Canadian industrial/electronic music group Delerium in 2000.

"Innocente," "Underwater," and "Aria" have music videos.

== Track listing ==
All songs written by Bill Leeb and all lyrics written by respective vocalists unless otherwise noted. There is also a misprinted European edition with the US track list. Only a few thousand albums were published this way. The misprint is recognizable by the CDs being pressed in The Netherlands and the cover is green instead of brown.

The vocals of "Aria" are taken from the Mediæval Bæbes song "All Turns to Yesterday", from the album Worldes Blysse.

=== North American Release ===
==== Disc one ====
1. "Terra Firma" – 5:39
  - Vocals: Aude; chants by Chanticleer
2. "Innocente" – 6:29
  - Vocals: Leigh Nash
3. "Aria" – 6:50
  - Vocals: Mediæval Bæbes
4. "Fallen Icons" – 6:30
  - Vocals: Jenifer McLaren
5. "Underwater" – 5:21
  - Vocals: Rani Kamal
6. "Myth" – 6:10
  - Vocals: Joanna Stevens (of Solar Twins)
7. "Nature's Kingdom" (Leeb, Luke Doucet, Kirsty Hawkshaw) – 5:15
  - Vocals: Kirsty Hawkshaw
8. "Daylight" – 5:32
  - Vocals: Matthew Sweet
9. "Temptation" – 8:06
10. "A Poem for Byzantium" – 5:53
  - Vocals: Joanna Stevens
11. "Amongst the Ruins" – 10:27

==== Disc two ====
Included on the US limited edition.

1. "Silence" (Airscape Remix) (Leeb, Rhys Fulber, Sarah McLachlan) – 8:40
  - Vocals: Sarah McLachlan
2. "Flowers Become Screens" (Deepsky Remix) (Leeb, Fulber, Kristy Thirsk) – 7:59
  - Vocals: Kristy Thirsk
3. "Inner Sanctum" – 7:23
  - Vocals: Kirsty Hawkshaw
4. "Nature's Kingdom II" – 5:18
  - Vocals: Jenifer McLaren

=== European Releases ===
==== Disc one ====
1. "Innocente" – 6:29
2. "Nature's Kingdom" – 5:15
3. "Daylight" – 5:32
4. "Underwater" – 5:21
5. "Fallen Icons" – 6:30
6. "Aria" – 6:50
7. "Myth" – 6:10
8. "Inner Sanctum" – 7:23
9. "A Poem for Byzantium" – 5:53
10. "Amongst the Ruins" – 10:27
11. "Silence" (Airscape remix) – 4:05

==== Disc two ====
1. "Silence" (In Search of Sunrise Remix)
2. "Innocente" (Mr Sam's The Space Between Us remix)
3. "Heaven's Earth" (Matt Darey remix)
4. "Innocente" (DJ Tiesto remix)
5. "Silence" (Micheal Woods remix)
6. "Terra Firma"

== Certifications ==
Certifications and sales for Poem
Region	Certification	Certified units/sales
Canada (Music Canada)	Gold	50,000^{^}
^{^} Shipments figures based on certification alone.
