= Silence (Delerium song) =

1999 song by Delerium

Single by Delerium featuring Sarah McLachlan

from the album Karma
- Released: May 3, 1999
- Genre: Ambient (original version); vocal trance (Airscape and Tiësto remixes)
- Length: 6:33 (album version); 3:47 (Airscape remix edit); 8:36 (Airscape remix); 3:40 (DJ Tiësto remix radio edit)
- Label: Nettwerk
- Songwriters: Bill Leeb; Rhys Fulber; Sarah McLachlan
- Producer: Delerium

Delerium singles chronology
"Duende" (1997)	"Silence" (1999)	"Heaven's Earth" (2000)

Delerium singles chronology
"Truly" (2004)	"Silence 2004" (2004)	"Angelicus" (2007)

Audio sample
- Delerium – Silence: file; help

"Silence" is a song by Canadian electronic music group Delerium featuring Canadian singer and co-writer Sarah McLachlan, first released as a single in May 1999. Over the years, its remixes have been hailed as one of the greatest trance songs of all time, over two decades after its initial release. The Tiësto remix of the song was voted by Mixmag readers as the 12th-greatest dance record of all time.

== Song ==
The original album version and subsequent radio edit of the song had a much slower tempo than the more well-known remixes and was essentially structured like a pop song, with the characteristic synthetic instrumentation of the more melodic side of ambient music – though including darker overtones, such as the prominently featured Gregorian chant (Gloria in Excelsis Deo). This last element often invites comparison to popular ambient/new age/world music projects of the 1990s like Enigma and Deep Forest who routinely sample chants from various ethnicities worldwide, though in contrast such vocals featured on Karma were all original recordings.

Although the original song did receive Canadian radio airplay in 1997, it was not released as a single until 1999, two years after the release of Karma, though it was only the Airscape Remix which received airplay at this time, rather than the more downtempo original version. The single prominently included remixes by DJ Tiësto, and Fade, which significantly boosted the song's proliferation through club play (particularly by influential DJs such as Paul Oakenfold) as evidenced by the single's positions on the Billboard Hot Dance Music/Club Play charts. It was on the soundtrack for the movie Brokedown Palace featuring Claire Danes and Kate Beckinsale.

As a consequence, the song was largely promoted as an uptempo vocal trance song, which then influenced the marketing of the next several Delerium singles as well. Unlike most of its successors, however, "Silence" also broke into the adult top 40 radio format due to the song's club success, and through radio airplay the original version received mainstream awareness relatively greater than the remixes among club patrons.

== Music video ==
The accompanying music video, directed by the directors collective Twobigeyes, was released in 2000 and was set to the Airscape remix. It has repeatedly been listed within the top 100 Ibiza anthems ever on online messageboards and, more recently, on MTV. The video was filmed on location in the United Kingdom ― mainly at Newgale Beach, Marloes Sands and "The Blue Lagoon" in Abereiddy, all in Pembrokeshire, Wales. Versions of the video featuring the Tiësto and Above & Beyond remixes followed the initial release.

A music video for "Aria", a track from the following studio album "Poem" that was first released as B-Side on a "Silence" single, was released in early 2000, featuring the Mediæval Bæbes. The single and video use the video edit of the song.

== Re-releases ==
2004 saw a new release of the single as "Silence 2004", though no song actually bears that title – the new single went to number one on the US dance chart and contained only remixes, both old and new. Of these, the new Above & Beyond remix is the most central, as the version included on the compilation The Best Of released in advance of the single. The other new remix was by Filterheadz; this version subsequently, in 2006, became popularly mislabelled as the nonexistent "Trentemøller 2006 Remix". A 2017 version of the song entitled "Rhys Fulber Project Cars Mix" featured in the launch trailer for Project CARS 2.

== Legacy ==
Hypnotised: A Journey Through Trance Music 1990–2005, a trance encyclopedia by Arjan Rietveld published in 2021, selected "Silence" as one of thirty individual trance releases discussed in detail. Additionally, Rietveld compiled several companion retrospective albums: the 2025 installment, Hypnotised: A Journey Through American Trance Music 1992–2002, includes the Sanctuary Mix, and was accompanied by online notes identifying "Silence" as "arguably the entire global scene's single most recognizable moment".

== Track listings ==
UK CD single 1999

1. "Silence (Sanctuary Mix Edit by Fade)" – 4:18
2. "Silence (Album Version Edit)" – 4:06
3. "Silence (Sanctuary Mix by Fade)" – 11:12

US CD single 2000

1. "Silence (Edit)" – 4:08
2. "Silence (DJ Tiësto In Search of Sunrise Remix)" – 11:33
3. "Silence (Airscape Remix)" – 8:37
4. "Silence (Sanctuary Mix by Fade)" – 11:12
5. "Aria" – 3.59

UK CD single 1 2000

1. "Silence (Airscape Remix Edit)" – 3:48
2. "Silence (DJ Tiësto In Search of Sunrise Remix)" – 11:36
3. "Silence (Album Version Edit)" – 4:06

UK CD single 2 2000

1. "Silence (Airscape Remix) – 8:38
2. "Silence (Original Fade Sanctuary Mix)" – 11:12

Benelux maxi single 2000

1. "Silence (Airscape Remix Edit)" – 3:46
2. "Silence (DJ Tiësto In Search of Sunrise Remix)" – 11:29
3. "Silence (Airscape Remix) – 8:37
4. "Silence (Original Fade Sanctuary Mix)" – 11:12
5. "Silence (Album Version Edit)" – 4:06

Benelux CD single 2000

1. "Silence (DJ Tiësto's In Search of Sunrise Remix – Patrick Kicken Re-Edit)" – 5:11
2. "Silence (DJ Tiësto's In Search of Sunrise Remix Edit)" – 4:24

German CD single 2000

1. "Silence (DJ Tiësto's In Search of Sunrise Remix Edit)" – 3:58
2. "Silence (Airscape Remix Edit)" – 3:47
3. "Silence (Album Version Edit)" – 4:04
4. "Silence (DJ Tiësto's In Search of Sunrise Remix)" – 11:31
5. "Silence (Airscape Remix) – 8:36
6. "Silence (Original Fade Sanctuary Mix)" – 11:07

US maxi single 2004

1. "Silence (Above & Beyond's 21st Century Edit)" – 3:42
2. "Silence (Filterheadz Remix)" – 7:27
3. "Silence (Above & Beyond's 21st Century Remix)" – 8:51
4. "Silence (Fade's Sanctuary Mix Edit)" – 3:50
5. "Silence (DJ Tiësto's In Search of Sunrise Remix)" – 11:33
6. "Silence (Michael Woods Mix)" – 8:08

UK CD single 2004

1. "Silence (Above & Beyond's 21st Century Edit)" – 3:39
2. "Silence (Filterheadz Remix)" – 7:33
3. "Silence (Airscape Remix Edit)" – 3:39
4. "Silence (Fade's Sanctuary Mix Edit)" – 3:51
5. "Silence (Tiësto's In Search of Sunrise Remix)" – 11:32
6. "Silence (Michael Woods Mix)" – 8:05

European CD maxi 2008

1. "Silence (Niels van Gogh vs. Thomas Gold Radio Edit)" – 3:29
2. "Silence (Niels van Gogh vs. Thomas Gold Remix)" – 7:34
3. "Silence (Lissat & Voltaxx Remix)" – 8:17
4. "Silence (DJ Tiësto's In Search of Sunrise Remix)" – 11:29
5. "Silence (Sanctuary Mix)" – 11:12
6. "Silence (Acoustic Version)" – 5:06

US The Essential Silence Digital Download 2010

1. "Silence (Album Version)" – 6:35
2. "Silence (Fade's Sanctuary Remix Edit)" – 4:22
3. "Silence (DJ Tiësto's In Search of Sunrise Remix)" – 11:36
4. "Silence (Airscape Remix) – 8:38
5. "Silence (Michael Woods Mix)" – 7:13
6. "Silence (Above & Beyond's 21st Century Remix)" – 8:51
7. "Silence (Filterheadz Remix)" – 7:32
8. "Silence (Lissat & Voltaxx Remix)" – 8:18
9. "Silence (Niels van Gogh Vs. Thomas Gold Remix)" – 7:33

Digital release 2011

1. "Silence (David Esse & Antoine Clamaran Remix)" – 8:45
2. "Silence (David Esse & Antoine Clamaran Remix Edit)" – 4:15

Digital release 2012

1. "Silence (W&W vs. Jonas Stenberg Remix)" – 5:28

Digital release 2016

1. Silence (Alyx Ander vs. Delerium – Original Mix) – 5:31
2. Silence (Alyx Ander vs. Delerium – Radio Edit) – 3:39

Digital release 2017

1. Silence (Rhys Fulber Project Cars Remix) – 6:27
2. Silence (Rhys Fulber Project Cars Dub) – 6:17

Digital release 2019

1. Silence (Youngr's 20 Years of Silence Remix) - 4:28
2. Silence (Dark Matter Remix) - 8:38

'Digital release 2021

1. Silence (Jens O. remix) Jay Frog - 2:56

== Charts ==
=== Weekly charts ===
==== Original version ====
Chart (1999–2001)	Peak position
Australia (ARIA)	6
Canada Adult Contemporary (RPM)	51
Ireland (IRMA)	1
Ireland Dance (IRMA)	1
UK Singles (Official Charts)	73
UK Dance (Official Charts)	11
UK Indie (Official Charts)	14
US Adult Pop Airplay (Billboard)	25

==== 2000 remixes ====
Chart (2000–2001)	Peak position
Austria (Ö3 Austria Top 40)	56
Belgium (Ultratop 50 Flanders)	5
Belgium (Ultratop 50 Wallonia)	2
Canada (Nielsen SoundScan)	5
Canada Dance/Urban (RPM)	38 (Note: "Silence" reached number 38 when RPM ceased publication in November 2000.)
Europe (Eurochart Hot 100)	15
Germany (GfK)	16
Ireland (IRMA)	6
Netherlands (Dutch Top 40)	7
Netherlands (Single Top 100)	7
New Zealand (Recorded Music NZ)	17
Norway (VG-lista)	15
Scottish Singles Sales (Official Charts)	1
Switzerland (Schweizer Hitparade)	100
UK Singles (Official Charts)	3
UK Dance (Official Charts)	1
UK Indie (Official Charts)	1
US Dance Club Songs (Billboard)	6

==== "Silence 2004" ====
Chart (2004–2005)	Peak position
Finland (Suomen virallinen lista)	12
Hungary (Dance Top 40)	20
Ireland (IRMA)	27
Scottish Singles Sales (Official Charts)	38
UK Singles (Official Charts)	38
UK Dance (Official Charts)	5
US Dance Club Songs (Billboard)	1
US Dance Singles Sales (Billboard)	4

==== "Silence 2008" ====
Chart (2008-2009)	Peak position
Belgium (Ultratop 50 Flanders)	12
Belgium (Ultratop 50 Wallonia)	9
Hungary (Dance Top 40)	1
Netherlands (Single Top 100)	48

Chart (2019)	Peak position
Hungary (Single Top 40)	28

==== John Summit remix ====
Chart (2025)	Peak position
US Hot Dance/Electronic Songs (Billboard)	16

=== Year-end charts ===
==== Original version ====
Chart (1999)	Position
Australia (ARIA)	35

Chart (2000)	Position
Ireland (IRMA)	21

Chart (2001)	Position
US Adult Top 40 (Billboard)	64

==== 2000 remixes ====
Chart (2000)	Position
Belgium (Ultratop 50 Flanders)	31
Belgium (Ultratop 50 Wallonia)	30
Ireland (IRMA)	61
UK Singles (OCC)	55

Chart (2001)	Position
Canada (Nielsen SoundScan)	24
Netherlands (Dutch Top 40)	23
Netherlands (Single Top 100)	72

==== "Silence 2004" ====
Chart (2005)	Position
US Dance Club Play (Billboard)	10

==== "Silence 2008" ====
Chart (2009)	Position
Belgium (Ultratop 50 Flanders)	69
Belgium (Ultratop 50 Wallonia)	46

== Certifications ==
Region	Certification	Certified units/sales
Australia (ARIA)	Platinum	70,000^{^}
Belgium (BRMA)	Platinum	50,000^{*}
United Kingdom (BPI)	Platinum	600,000^{‡}
^{*} Sales figures based on certification alone.^{^} Shipments figures based on certification alone.^{‡} Sales+streaming figures based on certification alone.

== Release history ==
Region	Version	Date	Format(s)	Label(s)	Ref.
United Kingdom	Original	May 3, 1999	12-inch vinyl	Nettwerk	
United Kingdom	Original	June 7, 1999	CD	Nettwerk	
United States	Original	July 26, 1999	Mainstream AC radio	Island Def Jam	
Australia	Original	1999	CD	F1; Nettwerk; Festival	
United Kingdom	2000 remixes	October 2, 2000	12-inch vinyl; CD	Nettwerk	

== See also ==
- List of number-one dance singles of 2005 (U.S.)
