= Distort (album) =

Remix album by Collide
- Released: January 13, 1998
- Studio: Noiseplus (Los Angeles, California)
- Genre: Darkwave; ethereal wave; industrial rock
- Length: 1998 - 1:13:24 / 2006 - 1:15:50
- Label: Re-Constriction / Cargo Music
- Producer: Statik

Collide chronology
Skin (1996)	Distort (1998)	Chasing the Ghost (2000)

Singles from Distort
- 1. "Son of a Preacher Man" Released: October 31, 2022

Alternative cover
- 2018 instrumental version cover

Distort is a remix album by Collide, released on January 13, 1998 by Re-Constriction Records and Cargo Music. It features remixed material from their debut album Beneath the Skin alongside various covers and one new song.

A remaster was released in 2006 with several newly remixed tracks along with "Felix the Cat", a cover song written for the 1999 charity album "A Cat-Shaped Hole In My Heart". The 2006 version of "Whip It" is significantly different from the 1998 release.

"Son of a Preacher Man" received a video directed by Kevin McVey which had a VHS release, and much later, a remix EP in 2022.

== Reception ==
Aiding & Abetting called the music on Distort "hit-and-miss" and that "the remixes here aren't uniformly as adventurous or ambitious as the band itself, but many do well." AllMusic awarded the album three out of five stars and said "Collide continue to expand their basic industrial sound on Collide, which incorporates techno and goth elements as well as an ethereal sheen reminiscent of the vintage 4AD label sound." Sonic Boom called the collection "one of the best remix albums released in recent memory for not only the depth and extreme diversity of the remixes but for the track selection as well making this record a definite must have." Lollipop Magazine criticized the album for being a poor introduction to the band's art and unnecessary. Ink 19 called the album "original and seductive" and stated "Distort offers a look from the remixer's mind into the eye of talent." Another critic at Ink 19 called it a "consistently excellent" album with "dancefloor prowess coupled with lyrical grace."

== Track listing ==
All tracks are written by Collide, except where noted.

Distort (1998)
No.	Title	Writer(s)	Remixer(s)	Length
1.	"Pandora's Box" (Opened Remix)		Statik	6:46
2.	"Son of a Preacher Man" (Bat Remix) (Dusty Springfield cover)	John Hurley and Ronnie Wilkins	Statik	5:44
3.	"Falling Up" (Egypt Remix)	Collide; Marko Fox	Spirits in Sin; Kneel Cohn; Ron McLin	4:51
4.	"Whip It" (Version 2.0) (Devo cover)	Gerald Casale; Mark Mothersbaugh		3:32
5.	"Beneath the Skin" (Razors Edge Remix)		Das Ich; Bruno Kramm	4:37
6.	"Obsession" (Version 2.0) (Siouxsie & The Banshees cover)	Budgie; John McGeoch; Steven Severin; Siouxsie Sioux		5:01
7.	"Violet's Dance" (Abstract Dub Fuck)		Alien Faktor; Tom Muschitz	2:28
8.	"Falling Up" (Full Moon Remix)	Collide; Marko Fox	Waiting for God; Martin Myers; Greg Price	3:57
9.	"Black" (Pitched Remix)		Crocodile Shop; Mick Hale	5:50
10.	"Pandora's Box" (Ultrajet Remix)		T.H.C.; George Sarah	8:22
11.	"Strange" (Bizarre Remix)		SMP; Jason Bazinet	5:23
12.	"Deep" (2Deep Remix)	Collide; Chris Candelaria	Regenerator; Wrex Mock; Gear Sullins	5:05
13.	"Violet's Dance" (Blister Feet Remix)		Idiot Stare; Chad Bishop	5:21
14.	"Fear No Evil"			6:28
Total length:				1:13:24

Distort (2006 remaster)
No.	Title	Writer(s)	Remixer(s)	Length
1.	"Pandora's Box" (Opened Remix) (Version 2.0)		Statik	6:44
4.	"Whip It" (Version 3.0) (Devo cover)	Gerald Casale; Mark Mothersbaugh	Statik	3:34
6.	"Obsession" (Version 3.0) (Siouxsie & The Banshees cover)	Budgie; John McGeoch; Steven Severin; Siouxsie Sioux		5:01
14.	"Fear No Evil" (Version 2.0)			6:33
15.	"Felix the Cat" (Version 2.0) (Winston Sharples cover)	Winston Sharples		2:22
Total length:				1:15:50

Distort (Instrumentals) alternate mix
No.	Title	Writer(s)	Length
12.	"Deep" (Guitar Only)	Collide; Chris Candelaria	3:07

== Personnel ==
Adapted from the Distort liner notes.

Collide

- Statik – noises, mastering, arrangements, remixer (1, 2, 4, 6)
- kaRIN – vocals

Additional performers

- Bruce A. King – guitar (2)
- Scott Landes – guitar (4) (2006 release only)

Production and design

- T.J. Barrial – front cover photography
- Dave Keffer (as Creative Imaging) – Graphic assistance
- Collide – Internal photos, concept and layout

== Release history ==
Region	Date	Label	Format	Catalog
United States	1998	Re-Constriction / Cargo Music	CD	REC-033
United States	2006	Noiseplus	CD	Noise 007
United States	2006	Noiseplus	DL	808458700028
United States	2018	Noiseplus	DL	

Professional ratings
Review scores
Source	Rating
AllMusic	3/5 stars
