= Some Kind of Strange =

Studio album by Collide
- Released: April 22, 2003
- Studios: Noiseplus (Los Angeles, California)
- Genres: Darkwave; Industrial rock; trip hop
- Length: 56:25
- Label: Noiseplus
- Producer: Statik

Collide chronology
Chasing the Ghost (2000)	Some Kind of Strange (2003)	Vortex (2004)

Alternative cover
- 2018 instrumental version cover

Some Kind of Strange is the third studio album by Collide, released on April 22, 2003 by Noiseplus Music.

A video for "Euphoria" was directed by Kevin McVey. This was released on the 2005 DVD "Like the Hunted".

A special edition was released on October 31, 2020. This CD+Blu-ray re-release featured the full album remixed and remastered from the original tracks, the original mix, a 5.1 mix, instrumentals, early versions, previously unreleased bonus tracks, video footage, and other content.

== Reception ==
In Music We Trust said the band "churns out a heady cacophony of futuristic and mechanized sounds powered by distorted guitars, robotic rhythms and bigger-than-life synthesized symphonics, and then caps off the beautiful mess with the super-sensual, threatening purrs and dangerous coos of Collide's vampy vocalist"

== Track listing ==
All music is composed by Collide.

Standard Edition
No.	Title	Length
1.	"Crushed"	5:19
2.	"Euphoria"	5:27
3.	"Modify"	5:56
4.	"Somewhere"	6:16
5.	"Slither Thing"	4:00
6.	"Inside"	4:09
7.	"Mutation"	4:30
8.	"Tempted"	6:43
9.	"Shimmer"	5:24
10.	"Complicated"	4:36
11.	"So Long"	4:05
Total length:		56:25

2020 Special Edition (CD+Blu-ray bonus tracks)
No.	Title	Remixer(s)	Length
12.	"Euphoria" (Emirian Mix - Video Edit)	Charlie Clouser; Statik	4:45
13.	"Empire" (previously unreleased)		5:01
14.	"Gotta Hold On Me" (previously unreleased)		4:37
15.	"Twilight Moment" (previously unreleased)		3:47
16.	"Sick Spider" (previously unreleased)		2:26
Total length:			20:36

2020 Special Edition (Blu-ray bonus tracks)
No.	Title	Length
1.	"Modify" (acoustic version)
2.	"Euphoria" (ambient mix)

2020 Special Edition (Early Versions)
No.	Title	Length
1.	"Crushed" (Early Version)	3:56
2.	"Euphoria" (Early Version)	3:29
3.	"Modify" (Early Version)	3:06
4.	"Somewhere" (Early Version)	5:13
5.	"Slither Thing" (Early Version)	3:53
6.	"Inside" (Early Version)	3:31
7.	"Mutation" (Early Version)	4:08
8.	"Tempted" (Early Version)	6:36
9.	"Shimmer" (Early Version)	5:34
10.	"Complicated" (Early Version)	4:39
Total length:		44:05

== Personnel ==
Adapted from the Some Kind of Strange liner notes.

Collide

- Statik – noises, production, engineering, mixing
- kaRIN – vocals

Additional performers

- Kevin Crompton (as cEvin Key) – live drums (2)
- Rogerio Silva – additional acoustic guitar and electric guitar (2, 7, 8), acoustic guitar (3, 5), guitar (9, 10)
- Kevin Kipnis – additional guitar and bass (2), electric guitar (6, 10), additional acoustic guitar
- Dave Keffer (as Kef) – bass and additional keyboard (6)
- Gilbert Levy – live percussion (4, 8, 9)
- X-8 – additional electric guitar (8)
- Danny Carey – live drums (engineered by Mark Walk) (4)

Production and design

- Chris Bellman – mastering
- Bernie Grundman – mastering
- Terri King – clothing
- Bridget Straus – hair
- Angel Decker – make-up
- Chad Michael Ward – cover art, inside art, band photos
- Dave Keffer (as Kef) – additional inside artwork manipulation
- X-8 – detail of texture paintings
- Collide – inside photography, layout, and design

"Slither Thing" contains a sample from the Slither Thing Amish Rake Fight Remix by Mike Fisher.

== Release history ==
Region	Date	Label	Format	Catalog
United States	2003	Noiseplus	CD	Noise 002
United States	2003	Noiseplus	Digital download	808458200023
United States	2018	Noiseplus	Digital download	
United States	2020	Noiseplus	CD/Blu-ray	Noise-31
