= Vortex (Collide album) =

Remix album by Collide
- Released: April 20, 2004
- Recorded: 2000–2004
- Genres: Industrial, dark wave, trip hop
- Length: 2:20:35
- Label: Noiseplus Music
- Producer: Statik

Collide chronology
Some Kind of Strange (2003)	Vortex (2004)	Live at The El Rey (2005)

Vortex is a double remix album by the group Collide, featuring remixes of songs from their albums Chasing the Ghost (2000) and Some Kind of Strange (2003) and 3 new covers.

An open call for remixes was put out by the band, the very best of which were included on the CD release.

Charlie Clouser's remix of "Euphoria" was used as a basis for the video edit of the song which was later released as a bonus on the DVD Like the Hunted (2005).

== Track listing ==
All tracks are written by Collide, except where noted.

Vortex
No.	Title	Writer(s)	Remixer(s)	Length
1.	"Euphoria" (Emirian Mix)		Charlie Clouser	6:32
2.	"Feed Me To The Lions" (Adam and the Ants cover)	Adam Ant		4:07
3.	"Slither Thing" (Amish Rake Fight Mix)		Mike Fisher	4:37
4.	"Razor Sharp" (Dull Mix)		Wade Alin	3:59
5.	"Like You Want To Believe" (Antistatic Mix)		Remko van der Spek	3:53
6.	"The Lunatics Have Taken Over The Asylum" (Fun Boy Three cover)	Lynval Golding; Terry Hall; Neville Staple		5:34
7.	"Predator" (Final Mix)	Frontline Assembly; Bill Leeb; Chris Peterson	Collide	6:32
8.	"Crushed" (5AM Heavenly Mix)		Dave Simpson	4:57
9.	"Wings of Steel" (Core Mix)		Nils Schulte	6:36
10.	"Halo" (Sensory Gate Aura Mix)		Andrea Pozzi; Francesco Corsini	7:49
11.	"Inside" (Shoe Gazing Mix)		Kevin Kipnis	5:57
12.	"Somewhere" (Orchestral Mix)		Mark Walk	3:06
13.	"Frozen" (Chill Mix)		Statik	7:37
Total length:				1:11:16

Vortex (Instrumentals) Alternate Mix
No.	Title	Remixer(s)	Length
12.	"Somewhere" (Solara's Place) (previously unreleased)	Statik	3:40

All tracks are written by Collide, except where noted.

Xetrov
No.	Title	Writer(s)	Remixer(s)	Length
1.	"Haunted When The Minutes Drag" (Love and Rockets cover)	David J; Daniel Ash; Kevin Haskins		7:43
2.	"Tempted" (Conjure One Mix)		Rhys Fulber	6:29
3.	"Crushed" (Fragment Mix)		Vincent Saletto	7:22
4.	"Like You Want To Believe" (Cylab Mix)		Percy	4:11
5.	"Crushed" (Out of Control Mix)		Jesse Maddox	4:23
6.	"Wings of Steel" (The Sound of Glass Mix)		Aaron McDonald	3:28
7.	"Inside" (External Mix)		Wade Alin	4:21
8.	"Crushed" (Now Forgotten Mix)		Ian Ross	5:53
9.	"Wings of Steel" (hEADaCHE Mix)		hEADaCHE	3:28
10.	"Like You Want To Believe" (Bondango's Twisted Acid Mix)		Marty Ball	4:48
11.	"Crushed" (Scored Mix)		Shane Terpening	5:26
12.	"Wings of Steel" (Astro Sensorium Mix)		Oleg Skrynnik	7:04
13.	"Euphoria" (Tears Mix)		J. Constantine; A. Ruggles	4:43
Total length:				1:09:19

== Reception ==
Vortex had virtually universal acclaim. Jane Magazine called it "a two-disk collection of decadent aesthetic brilliance" Sarah Bernardi from Collected Sounds said it was "otherworldly". For Regen, the collection was "truly a great listening experience for the heart and the soul." Starvox took a special note of the diversity of good quality material, saying "If only all independent artists were this sophisticated." French magazine Prémonition was similarly impressed. Steven Hurst at Glasswerk praised Clouser's opening remix: "The first couple of minutes build and build until you are thrown into a void of guitar ecstasy. And this quality is pretty much maintained throughout the first CD."

== Personnel ==
Adapted from the Vortex liner notes.

=== Collide ===
- Statik - noise, production, mixing
- kaRIN - voices, words

=== Additional performers ===
- Rogerio Silva - additional guitar (2 VORTEX, 1 XETROV)
- Mason C - additional bass (2 VORTEX)
- William Faith - additional guitar (1 XETROV)

=== Production and design ===
- Chris Bellman - mastering
- Chad Michael Ward - tree artwork and finalizing
- Matthew A. Cooke - Collide photos
- Collide - CD layout and design
- Terri King - clothing
- Bridget Stauss - hair and make-up

== Release history ==
Region	Date	Label	Format	Catalog
United States	2004	Noiseplus	CD	Noise 003
United States	2004	Noiseplus	Digital download	808458300020
United States	2018	Noiseplus	Digital download	
