= Son of a Preacher Man (video) =

Video by Collide
- Released: 1998
- Genre: Darkwave; industrial rock
- Length: 4:12
- Label: Re-Constriction
- Director: Kevin McVey
- Producer: Rachelle Murway

Collide chronology
Distort (1998)	Son of a Preacher Man (1998)	Chasing the Ghost (2000)

Collide video chronology
Son of a Preacher Man (1998)	Like the Hunted (2005)

Son of a Preacher Man is a music video by the darkwave band Collide, released on October 19, 1998 in NTSC VHS format. It was nominated for best video in the Los Angeles Music Awards on November 18, 1999.

The video was later released on the Like the Hunted DVD.

This cover was given an extended remix on 1998 remix album Distort. In 2022, a remix EP for the song was released, featuring the video mix as well as five new versions.

== Track listing ==
No.	Title	Writer(s)	Length
1.	"Son of a Preacher Man" (Dusty Springfield cover)	John Hurley and Ronnie Wilkins	4:12

== Personnel ==
Adapted from the Son of a Preacher Man liner notes.

Collide

- Statik – performer, programming, noises,
- kaRIN – performer, vocals

Production and design

- Kevin McVey – director
- Rachelle Murway – producer

== Release history ==
Region	Date	Label	Format
United States	1998	Re-Constriction	VHS
