= Two Headed Monster (album) =

Studio album by Collide
- Released: September 23, 2008
- Recorded: 2006 – 2008
- Studio: Noiseplus (Los Angeles, California)
- Genre: Darkwave; industrial; trip hop
- Length: 50:44
- Label: Noiseplus
- Producer: Statik

Collide chronology
Live at The El Rey (2005)	Two Headed Monster (2008)	Not Forgotten (2008)

Alternative cover
- 2018 instrumental version cover

Two Headed Monster is the fourth studio album by Collide, released on September 23, 2008 by Noiseplus Music.

This album features the whole touring band (2004-2005) and has more of an industrial rock sound than previous releases.

== Reception ==
Chain D.L.K. said "every corner turned by another track on Two Headed Monster holds a dark and delicious delight" and "there are enough mood and tempo changes, enough twisted sonics, potently placed power chords, dynamic shifts and compelling rhythms to satisfy the most demanding alt rock listeners."

== Track listing ==
All tracks are written by Collide, except where noted.

No.	Title	Writer(s)	Length
1.	"Tongue Tied & Twisted"		5:12
2.	"Chaotic"		4:49
3.	"A Little Too Much"		4:48
4.	"Pure Bliss"	Collide; Scott Landes	5:50
5.	"Spaces in Between"		4:11
6.	"Silently Creeping"		4:58
7.	"Head Spin"		6:22
8.	"Two Headed Monster"		3:22
9.	"Shifting"		4:56
10.	"Utopia"		6:23
Total length:			50:44

Instrumental edition bonus tracks
No.	Title	Length
11.	"Cherry (Instrumental)" (Previously unreleased)	3:53

== Personnel ==
Adapted from the Two Headed Monster liner notes.

Collide

- Statik) – noise, production, mixing
- kaRIN – vocals, words

Additional performers

- Danny Carey – additional drums (1, 2, 4, 5)
- Dean Garcia – bass guitar (2)
- Kai Kurosawa – bass guitar (3–5, 7–9)
- Scott Landes – additional guitar (4, 5, 10)
- Chaz Pease – additional drums (2–5, 8)
- Rogerio Silva – additional guitar (1–6, 8, 9)

Production and design

- Chris Bellman – mastering
- Bernie Grundman – mastering
- Derek Caballero – cover photo , booklet photos
- Dan Santoni – booklet photos
- Glenn Campbell – back tray photo
- Collide – Artwork and layout

== Release history ==
Region	Date	Label	Format	Catalog
United States	2008	Noiseplus	CD	Noise 011
United States	2008	Noiseplus	DL	808458011025
United States	2018	Noiseplus	DL	
