= ...The Crimson Trial =

Demo album by Collide
- Released: 1995
- Studios: Noiseplus (Los Angeles, California)
- Genres: Darkwave; industrial rock
- Length: 54:19
- Label: Hearogliphics Music
- Producer: Statik

Collide chronology
...The Crimson Trial (1995)	Beneath the Skin (1996)

...The Crimson Trial is the debut demo album by Collide, released in 1995 by Hearogliphics Music. It was pressed on limited quantity cassette tape. All tracks are different than those on later releases.

At least three versions of this release exist. One with twelve tracks, one missing the final track, and one with only three songs.

== Reception ==
Sonic Boom praised the vocal performances of ...The Crimson Trial and said that vocalist Tripp9 "creates a distinctive mood with seems to mesh with whatever particular style of music being played whither it is hardcore industrial dance to ambient percussion."

== Track listing ==
=== 12-Track Cassette ===
All lyrics are written by Tripp9; all music is composed by Tripp9 and Statik.

Side 1
No.	Title	Writer(s)	Length
1.	"Violet's Dance"		3:19
2.	"Deep"	Collide; Chris Candelaria	3:17
3.	"Have Faith"		4:54
4.	"Black"		4:11
5.	"Strange"	Collide; Marko Fox	5:21
6.	"Dreams and Illusions"		6:16
7.	"Falling Up"	Collide; Marko Fox	4:15
Total length:			31:34

Side 2
No.	Title	Length
1.	"Violet's Dance" (Vocal Mix)	3:08
2.	"Black" (Vocal Mix)	4:12
3.	"Falling Up" (Instrumental Chaos Mix)	4:02
4.	"Dreams and Illusions" (Instrumental Dub)	6:19
5.	"Have Faith" (Vocal Mix)	5:02
Total length:		22:44

=== 3-Track Cassette (aka Violet's Dance) ===
Side 1
No.	Title	Length
1.	"Violet's Dance" (demo mix)
2.	"Black" (demo mix)
3.	"Falling Up" (demo mix)

== Personnel ==
Adapted from ...The Crimson Trial liner notes.

Collide

- Statik – Programming, Noise, Sonic Matrix Assembly
- Tripp9 – vocals, poetry

=== Additional perfomers ===
- Chris Candelaria – guitar and bass (2)
- Marko Fox – guitar (5) / guitar and bass (7)

Production and design

- Durmel DeLeon – photography
- Noiseplus Productions – cover art, layout

== Release history ==
Region	Date	Label	Format	Catalog
United States	1995	Hearogliphics	CS	NPCS-001
