= Not Forgotten (EP) =

EP of remixes & live performances by Collide
- Released: November 6, 2008
- Recorded: 2006 – 2008
- Studios: Noiseplus (Los Angeles, California)
- Genres: Darkwave; industrial; trip hop
- Length: 38:06
- Label: Noiseplus

Collide chronology
Two Headed Monster (2008)	Not Forgotten (2008)	These Eyes Before (2009)

Not Forgotten is a digital-only EP by Collide, released on September 23, 2008 by Noiseplus Music.

It consists of alternate versions of material from their first three albums.

== Track listing ==
All tracks are written by Collide, except Deep written by Collide and Chris Candelaria.

No.	Title	Remixer(s)	Length
1.	"Wings of Steel" (West Coast Tour)		4:47
2.	"Like You Want To Believe" (West Coast Tour)		3:28
3.	"Halo" (Crimson Incision Mix)	Whitney Kew	6:54
4.	"Wings of Steel" (Dislocated Mix)	T.J. Naylor	4:21
5.	"Euphoria" (Ambient Mix)	Statik	5:46
6.	"Wings of Steel" (Calm Mix)	Statik	5:32
7.	"Deep" (Like the Hunted Acoustic)		3:00
8.	"Modify" (Like the Hunted Acoustic)		4:25
Total length:			38:06

== Personnel ==
Adapted from the Not Forgotten liner notes.

Collide

- Statik – noise, remixer (5, 6)
- kaRIN – vocals, words

Production and design

- Chris Bellman – mastering
- Glenn Campbell – photography
- Dan Santoni – photography
- Derek Caballero – cover art, photography

== Release history ==
Region	Date	Label	Format
United States	2008	Noiseplus	DL
