= The Darkness Forever =

Studio album of cover songs by Collide
- Released: July 16, 2024
- Studios: Noiseplus (Los Angeles, California)
- Genres: Darkwave; industrial
- Length: 47:57
- Label: Noiseplus
- Producer: Statik

Collide chronology
Unholy (2023)	The Darkness Forever (2024)	Signals (Volume 1) (2025)

Singles from The Darkness Forever
- 1. "Unholy" Released: April 25, 2023

The Darkness Forever is the second cover album by Collide, released on July 16, 2024, by Noiseplus Music.

== Reception ==
A Model of Control reviewed The Darkness Forever positively, impressed by the successful cover of Björk, and noting that all of the tracks were respectful of the source material. Regen Magazine compared the album to Collide's previous cover album These Eyes Before, stating that they "[manage] to create a fuller experience" of each track they cover. They found the Muse and Peter Gabriel covers jarring, though. Regen Magazine also praised the music, indicating the instrumental version of the album can be enjoyed on its own. Buzzslayers were impressed with how tracks from "different decades [and] genres" were made to sound as a cohesive album. They also singled out kaRIN's vocal work on the Björk cover for managing to assume the character from the original.

== Track listing ==
No.	Title	Writer(s)	Length
1.	"Wandering Star" (Portishead cover)	Sylvester Allen; Lee Oskar; Beth Gibbons; Morris Dickerson; Charles W. Miller; Howard E. Scott	04:55
2.	"Heart-Shaped Box" (Nirvana cover)	Kurt Cobain	05:11
3.	"Half Light" (Tomandandy with Low cover)	Tom D. Hajdu; Andrew M. Milburn	04:24
4.	"Supermassive Black Hole" (Muse cover)	Matt Bellamy	03:29
5.	"Unholy" (Sam Smith cover)	Samuel Frederick Smith; Ilya Salmanzadeh; Kim Petras; Henry Russell Walter; Blake Slatkin; James John Napier; Omer Fedi	03:22
6.	"Criminal" (Fiona Apple cover)	Fiona Apple	04:18
7.	"Broken Machine" (Nothing But Thieves cover)	David Algernon Bayley	04:09
8.	"Human Behavior" (Björk cover)	Bjork Gudmundsdottir; Antonio Carlos Jobim; Nellee Hooper	04:05
9.	"Games Without Frontiers" (Peter Gabriel cover)	Peter Gabriel	04:35
10.	"Sweet Jane" (The Velvet Underground cover)	Lou Reed	04:23
11.	"Rocket Man" (Elton John cover)	Elton John; Bernie Taupin	05:06
Total length:			47:57

== Personnel ==
=== Collide ===
- Statik – noise, production, mixing, mastering
- kaRIN – vocals

=== Production and design ===
- kaRIN and Statik – artwork, photos, and design
