= These Eyes Before =

Studio album of cover songs by Collide
- Released: October 31, 2009
- Recorded: 2008 – 2009
- Studio: Noiseplus (Los Angeles, California)
- Genre: Darkwave; industrial
- Length: 43:22
- Label: Noiseplus
- Producer: Statik

Collide chronology
Not Forgotten (2008)	These Eyes Before (2009)	Counting to Zero (2011)

These Eyes Before is the first cover album by Collide, released on October 31, 2009, by Noiseplus Music.

== Reception ==
Addicted to Media claimed These Eyes Before "gives the feeling of hearing these songs for the first time and falling in love with them all over again" and that the band's "respect for the artists and the songs they covered is evident and the production of the songs is flawless." Release Magazine gave the album six out of ten and said "Collide have developed their own sexy, slow, groovy sound over the years, and manage to keep that throughout, keeping it interesting" but that "they always slow the songs down, which means that some songs lose their energy in the process."

== Track listing ==
These Eyes Before
No.	Title	Writer(s)	Length
1.	"Breathe" (Pink Floyd cover)	David Gilmour; Roger Waters; Richard Wright	3:22
2.	"Nights in White Satin" (The Moody Blues cover)	Justin Hayward	5:09
3.	"Come Together" (The Beatles cover)	Lennon–McCartney	4:14
4.	"Creep" (Radiohead cover)	Colin Greenwood; Jonny Greenwood; Albert Hammond; Mike Hazlewood; Ed O'Brien; Phil Selway; Thom Yorke	4:17
5.	"Rock On" (David Essex cover)	David Essex	3:25
6.	"I Feel You" (Depeche Mode cover)	Martin L. Gore	5:03
7.	"Space Oddity" (David Bowie cover)	David Bowie	4:36
8.	"Baby Did a Bad Bad Thing" (Chris Isaak cover)	Chris Isaak	2:53
9.	"Tusk" (Fleetwood Mac cover)	Lindsey Buckingham	3:54
10.	"Comfortably Numb" (Pink Floyd cover)	Gilmour; Waters	6:29
Total length:			43:22

These Eyes Before (Instrumentals) Bonus Track
No.	Title	Writer(s)	Length
11.	"Comfortably Numb" (Orchestral Mix)	Gilmour; Waters	6:29

== Personnel ==
Adapted from the These Eyes Before liner notes.

Collide

- Statik – keyboards, computer sequencing, noise, production, mixing, electric guitar (2, 6, 9)
- kaRIN – vocals

Additional performers

- Kai Kurosawa – bass guitar (1, 3, 10)
- Scott Landes – electric guitar (2, 7, 8, 10), electric slide guitar (1), acoustic guitar (1)
- Rogerio Silva – electric guitar (3, 4, 7), acoustic guitar (1)
- Dean Garcia – electric bass (2)
- Putnam City North High School Marching Band – arrangements
- Brooks Anderson – marching band coordinated and recorded by
- Tyler Long – marching band arrangement
- Susan Clothier – marching band director
- Joel Illgen – assistant band director
- Seth Adams – instruments (9)
- David Assaleh – instruments (9)
- Chantel Anderson – instruments (9)
- Garrett Bean – instruments (9)
- Jordan Brannan – instruments (9)
- Mitchell Brown – instruments (9)
- Verdes Cato – instruments (9)
- Darrien Cohens – instruments (9)
- Ryan Elliott – instruments (9)
- Brad Gessner – instruments (9)
- Coulter Harris – instruments (9)
- Christine Henderson – instruments (9)
- Connor Kennedy – instruments (9)
- Jon Koenn – instruments (9)
- Amy Kongs – instruments (9)
- Mike Lausser – instruments (9)
- Kevin Mat – instruments (9)
- Austin Meyer – instruments (9)
- Kevin Miller – instruments (9)
- Jeff Newell – instruments (9)
- Santiago Ramones – instruments (9)
- Cameron Satterlee – instruments (9)
- Jordan Satterlee – instruments (9)
- Brittany Savage – instruments (9)
- Brianna Schlosser – instruments (9)
- Jon Stroud – instruments (9)
- David Waters – instruments (9)
- Kim Wheeler – instruments (9)
- Ellen Whiteley – instruments (9)
- Farris M.C. Willinghammer – instruments (9)

Production and design

- Chris Bellman – mastering
- Bernie Grundman – mastering
- Dave Keffer – photos for Kefski Photo
- Nichola Thompson – clothing
- Amy Hollier – hair & make-up
- Collide – artwork and layout

== Release history ==
Region	Date	Label	Format	Catalog
United States	2009	Noiseplus	CD	Noise 013
United States	2009	Noiseplus	LP	Noise 014
United States	2009	Noiseplus	DL	808458013029
United States	2018	Noiseplus	DL	
