= Live at The El Rey =

Live album by Collide
- Released: December 6, 2005
- Recorded: April 14, 2005
- Venues: The El Rey Theater (Los Angeles, California)
- Genres: Darkwave; industrial; trip hop
- Length: 1:09:39
- Label: Noiseplus
- Producer: Statik

Collide chronology
Vortex (2004)	Live at The El Rey (2005)	Two Headed Monster (2008)

Collide video chronology
Son of a Preacher Man (1998)	Live at The El Rey (2005)

Alternative cover
- Like the Hunted DVD cover

Live at the El Rey is a live album by Collide, released on December 6, 2005, by Noiseplus Music. It was recorded on April 14th, 2005 at the El Rey Theatre in Los Angeles, CA.

A DVD release of this album with concert footage and bonus material entitled "Like The Hunted" was released a few weeks later on December 20, 2005.

A 20th-anniversary edition of the album was released on December 6, 2025. This was fully remixed from the ground up using new stem-separation technology. The band stated: "This is how it was always meant to sound—the definitive version. It gives the songs a whole new dimension and captures the energy of that night perfectly."

== Reception ==
Prognaut commended the guest musicians' performances, crediting them with granting the music more dimensions.

The DVD was editor's pick on Smother Magazine, where they stated: "Breathtaking. Both visually and audibly. “Like the Hunted” gives us unfortunate folks who haven’t seen Collide live in concert a chance to be there—practically on stage with the dynamic duo. Stuffed into this DVD is a slew of special features, videos, and their live performance at the El Rey in Los Angeles on April 14 of 2005. Ethereal vocals by kaRIN combined with the raw energy of Statik translates extremely well to the live stage setting."

== Track listing ==
All music is composed by Collide, except where noted.

Live at the El Rey (CD)
No.	Title	Writer(s)	Remixer(s)	Length
1.	"Intro"			2:05
2.	"Beneath the Skin"			4:50
3.	"Crushed"			5:06
4.	"Complicated"			4:19
5.	"Falling Up"			4:33
6.	"Dreamsleep"			4:27
7.	"Slither Thing"			3:39
8.	"Modify"			4:09
9.	"Razor Sharp"			4:50
10.	"White Rabbit" (Jefferson Airplane cover)	Grace Slick		3:25
11.	"Wings of Steel"			4:48
12.	"Like You Want to Believe"			3:25
13.	"Somewhere"			5:21
14.	"The Lunatics Have Taken Over the Asylum" (Fun Boy Three cover)	Lynval Golding, Terry Hall and Neville Staple		3:35
15.	"Euphoria"			6:26
16.	"Euphoria" (Video Edit)		Charlie Clouser; Statik	4:41
Total length:				1:09:39

== DVD release ==
For the first 11 years of writing and releasing music, Collide was solely a two-person studio band that did not play live at all. To help interpret the sound into the live setting, they enlisted Scott Landes and Rogerio Silva on guitars, Kai Kurosawa on warr guitar and bass, and Chaz Pease on drums. This concert, performed at the El Rey Theater in LA, was only their ninth show. It was filmed by Kevin McVey with five cameras, and was recorded digitally into a Pro-Tools system. The concert is presented in widescreen 16:9 format with multiple angles supported. Bonus features include music videos, additional live footage, studio acoustic performances, an interview, and over 150 photos.

All tracks are written by Collide, except where noted.

Like The Hunted (bonus features)
No.	Title	Writer(s)	Director	Length
1.	"Son of a Preacher Man (Dusty Springfield cover)" (Music Video)	John Hurley and Ronnie Wilkins	Kevin McVey	4:10
2.	"Euphoria" (Music Video)		Kevin McVey	4:00
3.	"Razor Sharp" (Music Video) (version 1)		Gabriel McIntyre	4:52
4.	"Like You Want to Believe" (West Coast Tour video)			3:32
5.	"Wings of Steel" (West Coast Tour video)			4:41
6.	"Modify" (Acoustic)			4:31
7.	"Deep" (Acoustic)	Collide; Chris Candelaria		3:24
8.	"Razor Sharp" (Music Video) (version 2)			4:52
9.	"The Modification" (Interview/Video Outtakes)			15:49
Total length:				49:51

== Personnel ==
Adapted from the Live at The El Rey liner notes.

Collide

- Statik – noise, production, mixing
- kaRIN – voices, words
- Kai Kurosawa – warr guitar, bass
- Scott Landes – guitar
- Chaz Pease – drums
- Rogerio Silva – guitar

Additional credits

- Charlie Clouser – remixer (16)

Production and design

- Arturo Everit – live band photos
- Atratus – Statik and kaRIN photo

== Release history ==
Region	Date	Label	Format	Catalog
United States	2005	Noiseplus	DVD	Noise 005
United States	2005	Noiseplus	CD	Noise 006
United States	2005	Noiseplus	DL	808458600021
United States	2025	Noiseplus	DL (2025 Remaster)	
