= Counting to Zero =

Studio album by Collide
- Released: September 27, 2011
- Studio: Noiseplus (Los Angeles, California)
- Genre: Industrial rock; trip hop
- Length: 57:02
- Label: Noiseplus
- Producer: Statik

Collide chronology
These Eyes Before (2009)	Counting to Zero (2011)	Bent and Broken (2012)

Alternative cover
- 2018 instrumental version cover

Counting to Zero is the fifth studio album by Collide, released on September 27, 2011 by Noiseplus Music.

== Reception ==
I Die:You Die described Counting to Zero as "a natural evolution away from their noisier days" and "Collide’s music has always been "deep", however one wants to take that term (the trip-hop elements of their sound, for example, are still in full effect), and it's encouraging to see them finding new ways to stay true to and explore the particular combination of mystique and virtuosity which has made them such an endearing and enduring force for all these years." ReGen praised called the album "quintessential", awarded the album three and a half out of five and said it "may not be a stretch for them, but is full of the same rich production and performance we’ve come to expect and love."

== Track listing ==
All tracks are written by Collide.

No.	Title	Length
1.	"Bending and Floating"	4:15
2.	"Lucky 13"	5:33
3.	"Mind Games"	4:58
4.	"In the Frequency"	5:30
5.	"Clearer"	5:48
6.	"Counting to Zero"	5:49
7.	"Human"	5:10
8.	"Tears Like Rain"	3:13
9.	"Further From Anything"	6:35
10.	"Slow Down"	4:52
11.	"Letting Go"	5:19
Total length:		57:02

Instrumental edition bonus tracks
No.	Title	Length
12.	"Further From Anything" (Slow Mix)	6:10
13.	"Letting Go" (Drumless Mix)	5:19

== Personnel ==
Adapted from the Counting to Zero liner notes.

Collide

- Statik – production, mixing, keyboards, electric guitar (2–4, 6, 9–11), zizzle (courtesy of Dayvv Brooks) (6)
- kaRIN – vocals, words

Additional performers

- Dean Garcia – bass guitar (4), electric guitar (9)
- Kevin Kipnis – bass guitar (11)
- Kai Kurosawa – bass guitar (1–6, 10)
- Scott Landes – electric guitar (1, 2, 4–6, 9–11), acoustic guitar (5, 6)

Production and design

- Chris Bellman – mastering
- Bernie Grundman – mastering
- Dave Keffer – photography
- Collide – artwork and layout

== Release history ==
Region	Date	Label	Format	Catalog
United States	2011	Noiseplus	CD	Noise 014
United States	2011	Noiseplus	DL	808458014026
United States	2018	Noiseplus	DL	
