= Son of a Preacher Man (Remixes) =

EP by Collide
- Released: October 31, 2022
- Genres: Industrial rock; Electro-industrial
- Length: 28:01
- Label: Noiseplus
- Producer: Statik

Collide chronology
Notes From The Universe (2022)	Son of a Preacher Man (Remixes) (2022)	Unholy (2023)

Son of a Preacher Man (Remixes) is a limited edition EP by Collide, released on October 31, 2022, by Noiseplus Music. Only 200 copies were made, each signed and hand numbered by the band.

The song is a Dusty Springfield cover, written by John Hurley and Ronnie Wilkins. Collide's version was originally created for a Re-Constriction compilation entitled cyberPUNK FICTION and given a video directed by Kevin McVey, later released on the Like The Hunted DVD. An extended mix was included on Collide's 1998 remix album Distort. The original version was released on Noiseplus Music for the first time on this EP.

The DJ Phrancis mix won a remix competition held by the band in 2006.

A new edit of Kevin McVey's music video was created for the Guflux Mix.

== Track listing ==
All lyrics are written by John Hurley and Ronnie Wilkins.

No.	Title	Remixer(s)	Length
1.	"Son of a Preacher Man" (Original Version)	Statik	4:12
2.	"Son of a Preacher Man" (Guflux Mix)	John van Loon	4:56
3.	"Son of a Preacher Man" (Katarrhaktes' Heretic Mix)	Katarrhaktes	5:21
4.	"Son of a Preacher Man" (G6 Mix)	Damian James; Statik	3:54
5.	"Son of a Preacher Man" (Heavenly Creatures Mix)	Richard Turek	3:58
6.	"Son of a Preacher Man" (DJ Phrancis Mix)	DJ Phrancis	5:40
Total length:			28:01

== Personnel ==
Adapted from the Son of a Preacher Man (Remixes) liner notes.

Collide

- Statik - Noise, additional guitar (4)
- kaRIN - Vocals

Additional performers

- Bruce A. King - guitars (1)

Production and design

- Isabella Mendes - Cover photography

== Release history ==
Region	Date	Label	Format	Catalog
United States	2022	Noiseplus	CD	NOISE-35
United States	2022	Noiseplus	Digital download	
United States	2023	Noiseplus	Digital download	
