= Freaks Me Out =

EP by Collide
- Released: August 22, 2025
- Studios: Noiseplus (Los Angeles, California)
- Genres: Industrial rock; Electro-industrial
- Length: 12:10
- Label: Noiseplus
- Producer: Statik

Collide chronology
Signals (Volume 1) (2025)	Freaks Me Out (2025)	Intruder (2025)

Freaks Me Out is a digital EP by Collide, released on August 22, 2025, by Noiseplus Music. It was created to promote their compilation album Signals and features two new mixes of the title song.

Freaks Me Out was originally released on the 2017 album Color of Nothing. Blue Stahli's remix can also be found on the 2018 remix album Mind & Matter. The Signals Mix of the title track is exclusive to this EP; it was not included on either Signals album.

== Track listing ==
All tracks are written by Collide.

No.	Title	Remixer(s)	Length
1.	"Freaks Me Out" (Collide vs. Blue Stahli Remix)	Statik; Bret Autrey	3:22
2.	"Freaks Me Out" (Blue Stahli Remix)	Bret Autrey	4:13
3.	"Freaks Me Out" (Signals Mix)	Statik	4:34
Total length:			12:10

== Personnel ==
Adapted from the Signals (Volume 2) liner notes.

=== Collide ===
- Statik - production, mixing, programming
- kaRIN - vocals, words

=== Additional performers ===
- Scott Landes - guitars

== Release history ==
Region	Date	Label	Format
United States	2025	Noiseplus	Download
