= Chasing the Ghost =

Studio album by Collide
- Released: October 31, 2000
- Studios: Noiseplus (Los Angeles, California)
- Genres: Darkwave; ethereal wave; industrial rock
- Length: 48:47
- Label: Noiseplus
- Producer: Statik

Collide chronology
Distort (1998)	Chasing the Ghost (2000)	Some Kind of Strange (2003)

Alternative cover
- 2018 instrumental version cover

Chasing the Ghost is the second studio album by Collide, released on October 31, 2000 by Noiseplus Music.

A special edition was released for the album's 20th anniversary on October 31, 2020. This CD+Blu-ray re-release came with the full album remixed and remastered from the original tracks, the original mix, a 5.1 mix, instrumentals, early versions, and three previously unreleased b-sides along with remixes and video footage.

== Reception ==
Side-Line Magazine said "this is an ethereal, emotive disc that crosses the cold fire of early Siouxsie with the warm urgency of modern trip hop, yet wholly manages to defy categorization."

== Track listing ==
All lyrics are written by kaRIN; all music is composed by Collide, except where noted.

Standard Edition
No.	Title	Writer(s)	Length
1.	"Transfer"		3:58
2.	"Wings of Steel"		5:36
3.	"Razor Sharp"		4:52
4.	"Dreamsleep"		5:23
5.	"White Rabbit" (Jefferson Airplane cover)	Grace Slick	3:41
6.	"Frozen"		5:01
7.	"Halo"		6:18
8.	"Monochrome"		4:56
9.	"Ocean"		5:25
10.	"Like You Want to Believe"		3:39
Total length:			48:47

2020 Special Edition (Bonus Tracks)
No.	Title	Remixer(s)	Length
11.	"Zero" (Previously unreleased)		5:17
12.	"Crash" (Previously unreleased)		2:32
13.	"Blow My Mind" (Previously unreleased)		2:22
14.	"Wings of Steel" (Dislocated Mix)	Whitney Kew	4:23
15.	"Halo" (Crimson Incision Mix)	T.J. Naylor	6:55
Total length:			21:29

2020 Special Edition (Early Versions)
No.	Title	Length
1.	"Transfer" (Early Version)	5:57
2.	"Wings of Steel" (Early Version)	4:59
3.	"Razor Sharp" (Early Version)	6:01
4.	"Dreamsleep" (Early Version)	4:59
5.	"Halo" (Early Version)	4:26
6.	"Monochrome" (Early Version)	4:33
7.	"Ocean" (Early Version)	5:28
8.	"Like You Want to Believe" (Early Version)	4:30
Total length:		40:53

== Personnel ==
Adapted from the Chasing the Ghost liner notes.

Collide

- Statik – noise, production, engineering, mixing
- kaRIN – voices, words

=== Additional performers ===
- Tim Pierce – Additional guitar (1, 3, 4)
- Chris Candelaria – Additional guitar (4)
- William Faith – Additional guitar (4, 5)
- Monica Richards – Additional vocals (8)
- Fritz Heede – Sitar (7)
- Kevin Kipnis – Additional guitar (10)

Production and design

- Billy Bowers – mixing (1)
- Chris Bellman – mastering
- Chad Michael Ward – cover art
- Gary Silva – kaRIN cover photography
- Pierre Silva – kaRIN cover photography
- Dan Santoni – inside portrait photography
- Terri King – clothing
- Collide – inside photography layout and design

== Release history ==
Region	Date	Label	Format	Catalog
United States	2000	Noiseplus	CD	Noise 10002
United States	2000	Noiseplus	DL	808458400027
United States	2002	Noiseplus	CD	Noise 001, NXT 0004
United States	2018	Noiseplus	DL	
United States	2020	Noiseplus	CD/Blu-ray	Noise-30
