= Beneath the Skin (Collide album) =

Studio album by Collide
- Released: January 1996
- Studios: Noiseplus (Los Angeles, California)
- Genres: Darkwave; ethereal wave; industrial rock
- Length: 59:54
- Label: Re-Constriction
- Producer: Statik

Collide chronology
...The Crimson Trial (1995)	Beneath the Skin (1996)	Skin (1996)

Singles from Beneath the Skin
- 1. "Skin" Released: June 3rd, 1996; 2. "Deep/Violet's Dance" Released: 1997

Alternative cover
- 2018 instrumental version cover

Beneath the Skin is the debut studio album by Collide, released in January 1996 by Re-Constriction Records in the USA and by Nightshade Productions in Germany, each with a different bonus track.

== Reception ==
Aiding & Abetting praised Beneath the Skin and said "the music and vocals build slowly around a pulsating beat, culminating with a orgy of sonic delights" and "the title track really show off Statik's talent for crafting a massively attractive sound." Alternative Press commended the band for being unique to Re-Constriction Records' roster and was especially praising of the track "Falling Up", which the critic claimed weaves "kaRIN's threads through a quilt of distant voices, submerged electric guitar chords, Laibachian ghosts and a Banshee beat." very atypical for the Re-Constriction label, breaking away from its traditional industrio-guitar sound." Jennifer Barnes of Black Monday "there's a lot that can be done with those contrasts, and I’m not sure they use noise to it's [sic] fullest potential" and "the music is put together almost flawlessly and is a little too perfect for my taste." Sonic Boom commended the writing of founding member Statik, saying he "is able to compose music which completely compliments kaRIN's voice without always having to resort to slow drawn out ballads and other conventional roles that female vocalists have been pigeon holed by popular music." A critic at Lollipop Magazine compared the band favorably to Cocteau Twins and Front Line Assembly "Collide creates a sound that is at once mysterious and obvious."

== Track listing ==
All tracks are written by Collide, except where noted.

Beneath the Skin (Re-Constriction)
No.	Title	Writer(s)	Length
1.	"Violet's Dance"		3:17
2.	"Beneath the Skin"		6:18
3.	"Falling Up"	Collide; Marko Fox	5:03
4.	"Deep"	Collide; Chris Candelaria	3:17
5.	"Black"		4:12
6.	"Strange"		5:18
7.	"Dreams and Illusions"		6:13
8.	"Have Faith"		4:58
9.	"Pandora's Box"		7:57
10.	"95&7"		2:20
11.	"Deep" (Christ Analogue remix)		3:45
12.	"Beneath the Skin" (Subconscious remix by cEvin Key)		7:16
Total length:			59:54

Beneath the Skin (Nightshade Productions)
No.	Title	Length
12.	"Falling Up" (instrumental chaos mix)
Total length:		56:38

== Personnel ==
Adapted from the Beneath the Skin liner notes.

Collide

- Statik – programming, noises, production, engineering, mixing, mastering, sonic matrix assembly
- kaRIN – vocals, poetry

=== Additional performers ===
- Danny Borsheid – Guitar (2)
- Marko Fox – Guitar, Bass (3) / Guitar (6)
- Chris Candelaria – Guitar, Bass (4)
- J. Gordon – Additional guitar (4)

Production and design

- Susan Jennings – cover photography
- Steve West – inside photography
- Jack Pedota – portrait avantography
- Durmel DeLeon – kaRIN insert photo
- Noiseplus Productions – Layout and design

== Release history ==
Region	Date	Label	Format	Catalog
United States	1996	Re-Constriction	CD	REC-020
Germany	1996	Nightshade	CD	N-01, SPV 085-43152
United States	2005	Noiseplus	DL	808458400027
United States	2007	Noiseplus	CD	Noise 004
United States	2018	Noiseplus	DL	
