= Color of Nothing =

Studio album by Collide
- Released: May 25, 2017
- Studios: Noiseplus (Los Angeles, California)
- Genres: Industrial rock; electro-industrial
- Length: 1:02:39
- Label: Noiseplus
- Producer: Statik

Collide chronology
Best of Collide (2013)	Color of Nothing (2017)	Mind & Matter (2018)

Singles from Color of Nothing
- 1. "Freaks Me Out" Released: August 22, 2025; 2. "Intruder" Released: September 12, 2025

Alternative cover
- 2018 instrumental version cover

Counting to Zero is the sixth studio album by Collide, released on May 25, 2017 by Noiseplus Music.

Two EPs with newly remixed songs from this album (Freaks Me Out and Intruder) were released in 2025 to promote the Signals compilations.

== Reception ==
Chain D.L.K. commended Counting to Zero called it "bigger, bolder and heavier album than they've ever done before." ReGen said "with Color of Nothing, the band has achieved a bold new standard of darkly melodic songwriting coupled with a truly industrialized rock aesthetic that we’ve rarely heard since the advent of '90s coldwave" and that they "return with some of the richest and most rocking songs they have yet produced, making for an excellent entry in the Collide discography."

== Track listing ==
All music is composed by Collide.

No.	Title	Length
1.	"Wake Up"	6:36
2.	"Soul Crush"	6:03
3.	"Freaks Me Out"	4:51
4.	"Will Not Be Destroyed"	5:32
5.	"Side to Side"	5:41
6.	"Intruder"	4:38
7.	"Fix"	6:06
8.	"Blurring the Edges"	5:33
9.	"Only Human"	5:55
10.	"Say What You Mean"	6:07
11.	"Pale Blue"	5:37
Total length:		1:02:39

== Personnel ==
Adapted from the Color of Nothing liner notes.

Collide

- Statik – production, mixing, programming, guitars (3, 5, 9)
- kaRIN – vocals, words

=== Additional performers ===
- Dean Garcia – bass guitar (1, 2, 7)
- Kevin Kipnis – guitars (1, 2, 7, 9)
- Scott Landes – guitars (1-8, 10)
- Wade Alin – additional programming (4)
- Joe Bull – slide guitar (5)
- Morgan O'Shaughnessey – strings (8)

=== Production and design ===
- Ken "HiWatt" Marshall – mastering
- JSR Photos – Collide photos
- Dave Keffer – Photoshop
- Sarah Cavender Metalworks – Mesh cuff
- Karen-Bates Ashley – Make-up
- kaRIN – Leather rings
- Collide – Artwork and layout

== Release history ==
Region	Date	Label	Format	Catalog
United States	2017	Noiseplus	CD, DL	Noise 016
United States	2018	Noiseplus	DL	
