= Bent and Broken =

Remix album by Collide
- Released: October 26, 2012
- Studios: Noiseplus (Los Angeles, California)
- Genres: Darkwave; downtempo; electro-industrial
- Length: 128:17
- Label: Noiseplus
- Producer: Statik

Collide chronology
Counting to Zero (2011)	Bent and Broken (2012)	Best of Collide (2013)

Alternative cover
- 2018 instrumental version cover

Bent and Broken is a remix album by Collide, released on October 26, 2012, by Noiseplus Music.

== Reception ==
ReGen awarded Bent and Broken three and a half out of five and said "this two disc offering of remixes and new material presents all the hallmarks of Collide's lush and atmospheric brand of electro/industrial."

== Track listing ==
All lyrics are written by kaRIN, except "Orgy" by Steven Severin and Robert Smith and "She Makes Me" by Brian May; all music is composed by Collide, except "Orgy" by Steven Severin and Robert Smith and "She Makes Me" by Brian May.

Disc one: Bent
No.	Title	Remixer(s)	Length
1.	"Mind Games" (cEvin Key/Ken "Hywatt" Marshall Mix)	Kevin Crompton; Ken Marshall	5:02
2.	"Orgy" (The Glove cover)		3:36
3.	"Bent and Broken"		4:49
4.	"In the Frequency" (Great Apes Mix)	Tom Gipson	5:27
5.	"She Makes Me" (Queen cover)		4:02
6.	"kaRIN, You're Not Yourself Today"	Aaron McDonald	2:24
7.	"Lucky 13" (Damaged Mix)	Android Lust	3:39
8.	"Mind Games" (Statik Mix)	Statik	5:31
9.	"Tears Like Rain" (Cloudburst Mix)	Katarrhaktes	4:13
10.	"Chaotic" (Shades of Red Mix)	Alyssa Finnivan	4:57
11.	"Clearer" (Shades of Red Mix)	Alyssa Finnivan	3:30
12.	"Lost in the Frequent Sea"	iNGRUO	5:26
13.	"Pure Bliss" (Black Sheep Mix)	José Navarro; Statik	4:23
14.	"Human" (n30fr05t Mix)	Matt Gatsos; Statik	3:36
15.	"Counting to Zero" (kaRIN's Lullaby Mix)	Antigen5; Statik	3:29

Disc two: Broken
No.	Title	Remixer(s)	Length
1.	"Tears Like Rain" (Psych-Nein Mix)	Psych-Nein	4:03
2.	"In the Frequency" (Chris Vrenna Mix)	Chris Vrenna	6:53
3.	"Chaotic" (Oxidized)	DJO2	6:20
4.	"Head Spin" (LgVela Dance Mix)	LgVela	4:15
5.	"Clearer" (Serrated Edge Mix)	Synkraft	6:22
6.	"Tongue Tied and Twisted" (Diffuzion Mix)	Diffuzion	5:22
7.	"Pure Bliss" (Bliss Tech Mix)	Vincent Saletto	6:40
8.	"In the Frequency" (Pure Oxygen)	DJO2	6:39
9.	"Chaotic" (Hazard Mix)	Synkraft	5:41
10.	"Counting to Zero" (Million Stars Mix)	Eric Fisher; Statik	4:22
11.	"Utopia" (Unraveling Breaths)	Whitney Kew; Statik	7:35

== Personnel ==
Adapted from the Bent and Broken liner notes.

Collide

- Statik – keyboards, sequencer
- kaRIN – vocals

Additional performers

- DJ Forensic – instruments (2.7)
- Rogerio Silva – guitar (1.5)

Production and design

- Dave Keffer – photography
- Ken Marshall – mastering
- Jennifer Miller – illustrations

== Release history ==
Region	Date	Label	Format	Catalog
United States	2012	Noiseplus	CD	Noise 015
United States	2012	Noiseplus	DL	808458015023
United States	2018	Noiseplus	DL	
