= Skin (EP) =

EP of remixes by Collide
- Released: June 3, 1996
- Studio: Various: Noiseplus; (Los Angeles, California); Temple Studios; (Berlin, Germany)
- Length: 35:38
- Label: Nightshade; SPV
- Producer: Statik

Collide chronology
Beneath the Skin (1996)	Skin (1996)	Distort (1998)

Alternative cover
- digital issue cover

Skin is an EP by Collide, released on June 3, 1996 by Nightshade Productions and SPV GmbH. The EP comprises seven remixes from Beneath the Skin, including six versions of the title track and one remix of "Deep".

The Constrictor and Razor's Edge mixes of "Beneath the Skin" appeared respectively on the Vis-À-Vis Vol-II compilation and the band's remix album Distort.

cEvin Key's "Subconscious remix" appears on the Re-Constriction US release of "Beneath the Skin" (album).

"Deep" (Acoustic Version) also appears on the "Deep/Violet's Dance" single.

== Track listing ==
All tracks are written by Collide, except where noted.

No.	Title	Writer(s)	Remixer(s)	Length
1.	"Beneath the Skin" (Collide Edit)			5:26
2.	"Beneath the Skin" (Constrictor Mix)		Phillip Boa	4:44
3.	"Beneath the Skin" (Razor's Edge Mix)		Bruno Kramm	4:40
4.	"Beneath the Skin" (Spank Remix)		Wrex Mock	4:40
5.	"Beneath the Skin" (Pulse Remix)		Thomas Franzmann (as Zip); Statik	5:47
6.	"Beneath the Skin" (Subconscious Remix)		cEvin Key; Ken Marshall; Anthony Valcic	7:20
7.	"Deep" (Acoustic Version)	Collide; Chris Candelaria		3:01
Total length:				35:38

== Personnel ==
Adapted from the Skin liner notes.

Collide

- Statik – programming, noises, production, mixing (1, 7), additional remixer (5)
- kaRIN – vocals

Additional performers

- Danny Borsheid – additional guitar (1)
- Bob Andrews – additional bass (2)
- David Vella – additional keys and engineering (2)
- Howard Keith – engineering (2)
- Patrice Synthea – backing vocals (4)
- Chris Candelaria – guitar (7)
- Jack Atlantis – additional engineering (7)

Production and design

- Susan Jennings – cover image
- Steve West – cover and inside texture photography
- Jack Pedota – kaRIN avantography
- Layout and design – Noiseplus Productions

== Release history ==
Region	Date	Label	Format	Catalog
Germany	1996	Nightshade/SPV	CD	N-03, SPV 060-13162
United States		Noiseplus	DL	skin-dl
