= Unholy (Collide song) =

Single by Collide
- Released: April 25, 2023
- Genre: Industrial rock; Electro-industrial
- Length: 3:22
- Label: Noiseplus
- Producer: Statik

Collide singles chronology
"Son of A Preacher Man (Remixes)" (2022)	"Unholy" (2023)	"The Darkness Forever" (2024)

Unholy is a digital single by Collide, released on April 25, 2023, by Noiseplus Music.

It is a cover of the Sam Smith/Kim Petras song of the same name. The single contains no additional material. It was later released on Collide's cover album The Darkness Forever.

A portion of the proceeds from this single were donated to The Trevor Project which provides support for the LGBTQIA+ community.

== Track listing ==
No.	Title	Writer(s)	Length
1.	"Unholy" (Sam Smith cover)	Samuel Frederick Smith; Ilya Salmanzadeh; Kim Petras; Henry Russell Walter; Blake Slatkin; James John Napier; Omer Fedi	3:22
Total length:			3:22

== Personnel ==
Adapted from the Unholy web page.

=== Collide ===
- Statik – noise, production, mixing
- kaRIN – vocals

=== Production and design ===
- Maor Applebaum – mastering
- kaRIN and Statik – cover artwork, photography, and design

== Release history ==
Region	Date	Label	Format
United States	2023	Noiseplus	Digital download
