= Intruder (EP) =

EP by Collide
- Released: September 12, 2025
- Studios: Noiseplus (Los Angeles, California)
- Genres: Industrial rock; Electro-industrial
- Length: 8:19
- Label: Noiseplus
- Producer: Statik

Collide chronology
Freaks Me Out (2025)	Intruder (2025)	Signals (Volume 2) (2025)

Intruder is a digital EP by Collide, released on September 12, 2025, by Noiseplus Music. It was created to promote their compilation album Signals and features two new mixes of the title song.

Intruder was originally released on the 2017 album Color of Nothing. The original mix of Maria Lui's remix can be found on the 2018 remix album Mind & Matter.

== Track listing ==
All music is composed by Collide.

No.	Title	Remixer(s)	Length
1.	"Intruder" (Signals Mix)	Statik	4:35
2.	"Intruder" (Maria Lui December Remix) (Signals Mix)	Maria Lui	3:44
Total length:			8:19

== Personnel ==
Adapted from the Signals (Volume 2) liner notes.

=== Collide ===
- Statik – production, mixing, programming
- kaRIN – vocals, words

=== Additional performers ===
- Scott Landes - guitars

== Release history ==
Region	Date	Label	Format
United States	2025	Noiseplus	Digital download
