= Mind & Matter =

Remix album by Collide
- Released: May 22, 2018
- Studios: Noiseplus (Los Angeles, California)
- Genres: Darkwave; electro-industrial
- Length: 141:09
- Label: Noiseplus

Collide chronology
Color of Nothing (2017)	Mind & Matter (2018)

Alternative cover
- 2018 instrumental version cover

Mind & Matter is a double remix album by Collide, released on May 22, 2018, by Noiseplus Music. It consists of mostly remixes with two new songs and one cover.

== Track listing ==
All music is composed by Collide, except "Imagine" by John Lennon and Yoko Ono.

Disc one: Bent
No.	Title	Remixer(s)	Length
1.	"Freaks Me Out" (Blue Stahli Remix)	Bret Autrey	4:13
2.	"Soul Crush" (WA HB remix)	Wade Alin	4:27
3.	"Fix" (Tkivo Remix)	Tkivo	5:23
4.	"Holding Back"		5:25
5.	"Winter Kills"		4:07
6.	"Imagine" (John Lennon cover)		7:11
7.	"Intruder" (Maria Lui December Remix)	Maria Lui	3:45
8.	"Side to Side" (_the boundless_ remix)	Nick Jones	4:05
9.	"Wake Up" (Purr Machine Remix)	Kevin Kipnis	5:14
10.	"Fix" (D'MacKinnon Remix)	D' MacKinnon	5:30
11.	"Heroes in Dust" (Nbn8n Remix)	Jason Yates	5:33
12.	"Intuder" (The Wave and the Particle Remix)	The Wave and the Particle	5:11
13.	"Side to Side" (The Stitchlings Remix)	The Stitchlings	2:34
14.	"Changing the Concept" (Katarrhaktes Remix)	Katarrhaktes	5:31

Disc two: Broken
No.	Title	Remixer(s)	Length
1.	"Side to Side" (Statik Remix)	Statik	5:56
2.	"Collide R U Dangerous?" (Milkfixer Remix)	Nathan Charlson	5:06
3.	"Freaks Me Out" (Modern Vultures Remix)	Hunter Vaughan	4:35
4.	"Intruder" (Jason Slater Remix)	Jason Slater	4:34
5.	"Blurring the Edges" (Last Minute Remix)	Throe	3:12
6.	"Pale Blue" (Rikka Remix)	Rick Moore	3:37
7.	"Will Not Be Destroyed" (Digital Gnosis Remix)	Nick Jones; Nick Liberatore	4:02
8.	"Soul Crush" (Alien Nation vs. Giant Monsters on the Horizon Remix)	Alien:Nation; Giant Monsters on the Horizon	4:32
9.	"Wake Up" (Lgvela Remix)	Luis Garcia Vela	5:01
10.	"Side to Side" (Rale Daver Remix)	Rale Daver	3:27
11.	"Fix" (Mesopik Remix)	Vladan Hranisavljevic	6:46
12.	"Only Human" (Blue Sky Alive Remix)	Blue Sky Alive	5:38
13.	"Say What You Mean" (The Wave and the Particle Remix)	The Wave and the Particle	5:29
14.	"Pale Blue" (BIINDS Rework)		5:36
15.	"Blurring the Edges" (Zero Meaning Remix)	Zero Meaning	5:37

== Personnel ==
Adapted from the Mind & Matter liner notes.

Collide

- Statik – keyboards
- kaRIN – vocals

Additional performers

- Richard Barron – string arrangements (1.6)
- Gidon Carmel – live drums (2.14)
- Klaas von Karlos – additional synthesizer (2.14)
- Jordi Kuragari – guitar (2.14)
- Scott Landes – guitar (1.5, 1.6)
- Héloïse Lefebvre – violin (2.14)
- Nicolo Sommer – electronics, mandolin, synthesizer and piano (2.14)

== Release history ==
Region	Date	Label	Format	Catalog
United States	2018	Noiseplus	CD, DL	Noise 017
United States	2018	Noiseplus	DL	
