= Love and Rockets =

Love and Rockets may refer to:

- Love and Rockets (comics), a comic book series by Jaime and Gilbert Hernandez
- Love and Rockets (band), an alternative rock band formed by former members of Bauhaus, named after the comic
  - Love and Rockets (album), a 1989 album by the band Love and Rockets
- Love & Rockets Vol. 1: The Transformation, a 2011 album by Murs and Ski Beatz
- "Love and Rockets (Hell's Screaming)", a bonus track from the King's X album XV

== See also ==
- "Love and Rocket", a 2002 episode of Futurama
