= Collide (band) =

American electronic music duo

- Origin: Los Angeles, California, U.S.
- Genres: Industrial rock; darkwave; electro-Industrial; trip hop
- Years active: 1992–present
- Labels: Noiseplus, Re-Constriction
- Members: Statik; kaRIN
- Website: collide.net

Collide is an American electronic music duo formed in Los Angeles in 1992, that has incorporated elements of trip hop, synthpop and music from the Middle East into their sound.

The name comes from the 'collision' of musical styles, primarily the ethereal vocals provided by kaRIN and the electronic music provided by Statik. Collide's debut album, Beneath the Skin, was released in 1996, followed by a remix album, Distort, in 1998. Dissatisfied with the music industry, Collide started their own record label, Noiseplus Music, and in 2000, they released their second studio album, Chasing the Ghost.

Three years later, they released their third studio album, Some Kind of Strange. The following year, the band released another remix album, Vortex, containing remixes by numerous remix artists, including Charlie Clouser and Rhys Fulber. Joining kaRIN and Statik this time around, and for their first live performances a little later in the year, were Scott Landes (guitar), Roger DaSilva (guitar), Chaz Pease (drums), and Kai Kurosawa (Warr guitars/bass).

In 2005, Collide released a DVD, entitled Like the Hunted, along with a live CD Live at The El Rey. Then they recorded with Curve's Dean Garcia in a project called The Secret Meeting. The album, Ultrashiver, was released under their Noiseplus label on June 26, 2007. On September 23, 2008, the band released their fourth studio album Two Headed Monster. Special guests on the album included Danny Carey from Tool and Dean Garcia from Curve.

At Halloween 2009, the album These Eyes Before was released. It was a 10-song album of cover versions of well-known songs by artists such as The Beatles, Depeche Mode, Radiohead, and Pink Floyd.

In January 2011, Collide was nominated for The 10th Annual Independent Music Awards under the Cover Song category for "The Lunatics Have Taken Over the Asylum".

== Members ==
=== Full time members ===
- kaRIN – vocals, lyrics
- Statik – music, production

=== Live members ===
- Scott Landes – guitars
- Rogerio Silva – guitars
- Chaz Pease – drums
- Kai Kurosawa – Warr guitar/bass

== Discography ==
Demo albums

- ...The Crimson Trial (1995, Noiseplus)

Studio albums

- Beneath the Skin (1996, Re-Constriction)
- Chasing the Ghost (2000, Noiseplus)
- Some Kind of Strange (2003, Noiseplus)
- Two Headed Monster (2008, Noiseplus)
- Counting to Zero (2011, Noiseplus)
- Color of Nothing (2017, Noiseplus)
- Notes from the Universe (2022, Noiseplus)

Remix albums

- Distort (1998, Re-Constriction)
- Vortex (2004, Noiseplus)
- Bent and Broken (2012, Noiseplus)
- Mind & Matter (2018, Noiseplus)

Cover albums

- These Eyes Before (2009, Noiseplus)
- The Darkness Forever (2024, Noiseplus)

Live albums

- Live at The El Rey (2005, Noiseplus)

Extended plays & singles

- Skin (1996, Nightshade)
- Deep/Violet's Dance (1997, Re-Constriction)
- Not Forgotten (2008, Noiseplus)
- Are You Listening (2020, Synthetic Media)
- Son of A Preacher Man (Remixes) (2022, Noiseplus)
- Unholy (2023, Noiseplus)
- Freaks Me Out (2025, Noiseplus)
- Intruder (2025, Noiseplus)

Compilation albums

- Best of Collide (2013, Noiseplus)
- Signals (Volume 1) (2025, Noiseplus)
- Signals (Volume 2) (2025, Noiseplus)

Releases with Dean Garcia/The Secret Meeting

Title	Release date	Label
Shiver X EP	June 26, 2007	Noiseplus Music
Ultrashiver	June 26, 2007	Noiseplus Music
Shooting Laser Beams	November 16, 2007	Noiseplus Music
