= Deep (Collide song) =

"Deep/Violet's Dance"

Single by Collide

from the album Beneath the Skin
- B-side: "Violet's Dance"
- Released: 1997
- Studio: Noiseplus (Los Angeles, California)
- Genre: Darkwave; industrial rock
- Length: 16:15
- Label: Cargo Music
- Producer: Statik

"Deep" is a song by Collide, released as a double A-side single with "Violet's Dance" in 1997 by Cargo Music. It was the only single created to support the band's debut studio album Beneath the Skin, which was released in January 1996.

Christ Analogue's remix is a bonus track on all versions of Beneath the Skin.

"Deep" (Acoustic Version) can also be found on the Skin EP.

== Reception ==
Black Monday credited the song "Violet's Dance" as exemplary of its album and said "beautiful and catchy melodies are tinged everywhere with noise, and the sample manipulation is extremely nimble." Sonic Boom said "it is highly unusual for a entirely electronic band to unplugged like this but it comes off extremely well" and listed the acoustic version of "Deep" as being the most unique track on the single.

== Track listing ==
All tracks are written by Collide, except "Deep" written by Collide and Chris Candelaria.

No.	Title	Remixer(s)	Length
1.	"Deep" (Clean Radio Edit)		3:23
2.	"Violet's Dance" (Radio Edit)		2:36
3.	"Deep" (Christ Analogue Mix)	Christ Analogue	3:46
4.	"Violet's Dance" (Apparatus NC Club Mix)	Apparatus	3:27
5.	"Deep" (Acoustic Version)		3:02
Total length:			16:12

== Personnel ==
Adapted from the Deep/Violet's Dance liner notes.

Collide

- Statik – programming, noises, sonic matrix assembly
- kaRIN – vocals, poetry

Production and design

- Immaculate – design

== Release history ==
Region	Date	Label	Format	Catalog
United States	1997	Cargo	CD	CS REC-020-1
United States	2008	Noiseplus	DL	skin-dl
