= Chris Bellman =

American mastering engineer

- Occupation: Mastering engineer
- Known for: Mastering (audio)
- Awards: Grammy Award for Best Engineered Album, Non-Classical (2009)

Chris Bellman is an American mastering engineer. He started working at Allen Zentz Mastering and, since 1984, he began working at Bernie Grundman Mastering studios. He received a Grammy Award for Best Surround Sound Album nomination at the 51st Annual Grammy Awards for Ringo Starr's Ringo 5.1: The Surround Sound Collection in 2009, and the following year was nominated for a Grammy Award for Album of the Year at the 52nd Annual Grammy Awards for the Black Eyed Peas' The E.N.D.. He won his first Grammy Award for Best Engineered Album, Non-Classical at the 61st Annual Grammy Awards for his mastering duties on Beck's Colors in 2019, sharing the award with fellow mastering engineers Randy Merrill, Emily Lazar and Tom Coyne.

== Awards and nominations ==
Grammy Awards

Year	Nominee / work	Award	Result	Ref.
2009	Ringo 5.1: The Surround Sound Collection	Grammy Award for Best Surround Sound Album	Nominated	
2010	The E.N.D.	Grammy Award for Album of the Year	Nominated	
2019	Colors	Grammy Award for Best Engineered Album, Non-Classical	Won	
