= Nothing Stays the Same Forever =

Greatest hits album by Hush
- Released: November 1976
- Genre: Glam rock
- Label: Wizard
- Producer: Robie Porter

Hush chronology
Rough Tough 'n' Ready (1975)	Nothing Stays the Same Forever (1976)	Touché (1977)

Singles from Nothing Stays the Same Forever
- 1. "Too Young to Know"/"Lies" Released: August 1976; 2. "Sunday" Released: December 1976

Nothing Stays the Same Forever (The Best of Hush Volume One) is the first greatest hits album by Australian glam rock group Hush, although some of the tracks were re-recorded. The album was released in November 1976 peaked at No. 57 and was certified gold on the Australian charts.

== Track listing ==
Side A (ZL 213)
No.	Title	Writer(s)	Album	Length
1.	"Get Rocked" (re-recorded version)	Les Gock, Keith Lamb	Get Rocked!
2.	"Bony Moronie"	Larry Williams	Rough Tough 'n' Ready	3:07
3.	"Rocking Gypsy King" (re-recorded version)	Gock, Lamb	C'mon We're Taking Over
4.	"Lies"	Gock, Lamb	Nothing Stays the Same Forever
5.	"C'mon We're Taking Over" (re-recorded version)	Gock, Lamb	C'mon We're Taking Over

Side B
No.	Title	Writer(s)	Album	Length
1.	"Glad All Over"	Dave Clark, Mike Smith	Rough Tough 'n' Ready
2.	"Too Young to Know"	Gock, Lamb, Robie Porter	Nothing Stays the Same Forever
3.	"Rough Tough 'n' Ready"	Gok, Lamb	Rough Tough 'n' Ready
4.	"Walking" (re-recorded version)	Gok, Lamb	Get Rocked!
5.	"Caroline" (re-recorded version)	Hush	C'mon We're Taking Over
6.	"Sunday"	Gok, Lamb	Nothing Stays the Same Forever

== Charts ==
Chart (1976–1977)	Peak position
Australian Albums (Kent Music Report)	57
