= Anthology 1992–1994 =

Compilation album by Spahn Ranch
- Released: June 13, 2000
- Recorded: 1991–1994
- Studio: Various: The Backroom; (Los Angeles, California); JLab Studio; (Los Angeles, California); Sinamatic; (Los Angeles, California)
- Genre: Industrial rock; electro-industrial
- Length: 104:36
- Label: Cleopatra
- Producer: Matt Green; Rob Morton; Rod O'Brien

Spahn Ranch chronology
| Beat Noir (1998) | Anthology 1992–1994 (2000) | Closure (2001) |

Anthology 1992–1994 is a compilation album by American electro-industrial group Spahn Ranch, released on June 13, 2000, by Cleopatra Records.

== Music ==
The album comprises the band's first four releases: Spahn Ranch (1992), Collateral Damage (1993) and The Blackmail Starters Kit (1994) and Breath and Taxes (1994). The collection also features three songs previously unreleased in Spahn Ranch's main discography: "Machine Politics" from The Whip (1993), "Failsafe" from The Colours of Zoth Ommog (1994) and "Reinventing Gravity", which was originally credited to Coersion, from Trance in Your Mind: The Unstoppable Trance Machine (1994). The track "Tour Intro 1994" was recorded during a live performance in New York City.

== Reception ==
Professional ratings
Review scores
| Source | Rating |
|---|---|
| AllMusic | 4/5 stars |

AllMusic awarded Anthology 1992–1994 four out of five stars and said "noisy, abrasive and forceful, Ranch provided some of the most memorable industrial grooves of the 1990s." Music critic Dave Thompson emphasized the importance of the collection by noting that its release was long overdue.

== Track listing ==
All lyrics are written by Athan Maroulis, except "Layin to Burn, " Mind Riot, "See My Knife" and "P.O.W." by Scott Franklin.

Disc one
| No. | Title | Music | Album (date) | Length |
|---|---|---|---|---|
| 1. | "Wires" | Athan Maroulis; Rob Morton | Collateral Damage (1993) | 5:35 |
| 2. | "Succumber" | Matt Green; Maroulis; Morton | Collateral Damage (1993) | 4:45 |
| 3. | "Forceps" | Maroulis; Morton | Collateral Damage (1993) | 4:06 |
| 4. | "Antibody" | Green; Maroulis; Morton | Collateral Damage (1993) | 3:20 |
| 5. | "Cesium 137" | Maroulis; Morton | Collateral Damage (1993) | 5:00 |
| 6. | "Breath and Taxes" | Maroulis; Morton | Collateral Damage (1993) | 4:04 |
| 7. | "Stoma" | Maroulis; Morton | Collateral Damage (1993) | 3:39 |
| 8. | "Peel" | Maroulis; Morton | Collateral Damage (1993) | 1:42 |
| 9. | "Machine Politics" | Green; Morton | Collateral Damage (1993) | 3:30 |
| 10. | "Quince" | Green; Maroulis; Morton | Collateral Damage (1993) | 5:27 |
| 11. | "Chuck" | Morton | Collateral Damage (1993) | 1:01 |
| 12. | "CON" | Green; Maroulis; Morton | The Blackmail Starters Kit (1994) | 3:48 |
| 13. | "Antibody" (Conspiracy Mix) | Green; Maroulis; Morton | The Blackmail Starters Kit (1994) | 3:28 |

Disc two
| No. | Title | Music | Album (date) | Length |
|---|---|---|---|---|
| 1. | "Breath and Taxes" (Deductable Mix) | Matt Green; Rob Morton | The Blackmail Starters Kit (1994) | 4:01 |
| 2. | "Forceps" (Sterilized Mix) | Maroulis; Morton | The Blackmail Starters Kit (1994) | 3:58 |
| 3. | "Succumber" (Blacklist Mix) | Green; Maroulis; Morton | Breath and Taxes (1994) | 4:58 |
| 4. | "Antibody" (Conspiracy Mix) | Green; Maroulis; Morton | The Blackmail Starters Kit (1994) | 3:49 |
| 5. | "Failsafe" | Green; Judson Leach | The Colours of Zoth Ommog compilation (1994) | 4:36 |
| 6. | "Commination" | Morton | The Blackmail Starters Kit (1994) | 4:26 |
| 7. | "Kenneth, What's the Frequency?" | Green; Morton | The Blackmail Starters Kit (1994) | 5:35 |
| 8. | "Tour Intro 1994" | | | 1:50 |
| 9. | "Reinventing Gravity" | Morton | Trance in Your Mind: The Unstoppable Trance Machine compilation (1994) | 3:55 |
| 10. | "Machine Politics" (Original Version) | Green; Morton | The Whip compilation (1993) | 3:48 |
| 11. | "Layin to Burn" | Green; Morton | Spahn Ranch (1992) | 2:39 |
| 12. | "Mind Riot" | Green; Morton | Spahn Ranch (1992) | 4:24 |
| 13. | "See My Knife" | Green; Morton | Spahn Ranch (1992) | 3:27 |
| 14. | "P.O.W." | Green; Morton | Spahn Ranch (1992) | 3:49 |

== Personnel ==
Adapted from the album's liner notes.

Spahn Ranch

- Scott Franklin – lead vocals (2.11–2.14)
- Matt Green – sampler, keyboards, production (1.1–1.11), mixing (1.1–1.11), remixer (1.3, 2.3), guitar and bass (2.11–2.14)
- Harry Lewis – percussion (1.12, 1.13, 2.1, 2.2, 2.4, 2.6, 2.7)
- Athan Maroulis – lead vocals (1.1–1.13, 2.1–2.10), mixing (1.1–1.13), remixer (2.4)
- Rob Morton – programming, sampler, production (1.1–1.11, 2.11–2.14), loops (1.1–1.11), mixing (1.1–1.13)

Production and design

- Judson Leach – engineering, mixing (1.12, 1.13, 2.1–2.7), additional programming (1.4, 2.5), remixer (2.1–2.4)
- Eunah Lee – design
- Rod O'Brien – production, engineering and mixing (2.11–2.14)

== Release history ==
| Region | Date | Label | Format | Catalog |
|---|---|---|---|---|
| United States | 2000 | Cleopatra | CD | CLP 0868 |
