= The Essential Johnny Winter =

Compilation album by Johnny Winter
- Released: April 30, 2013
- Genre: Blues rock
- Length: 2:36:27
- Label: Columbia

Johnny Winter chronology
Live Bootleg Series Vol. 8 (2012)	The Essential Johnny Winter (2013)	Live Bootleg Series Vol. 9 (2013)

The Essential Johnny Winter is a two-CD album by guitarist and singer Johnny Winter. It is a compilation of songs from previously released albums, many of them from the late 1960s and the 1970s. It was released by Columbia Records on April 30, 2013.

== Critical reception ==
Professional ratings
Review scores
Source	Rating
Allmusic	3.5/5 stars

On AllMusic, Steve Leggett wrote, "This set collects essential tracks and sides from his peak Columbia Records years in the late '60s and early to mid-'70s, a time when Winter's guitar-slinger image was being aggressively marketed. This collection doesn't tell the whole story, but it does spotlight his most commercial period, and quite wisely includes several live tracks, which quite effectively show off Winter's roaring stage image."

On Vintagerock.com, Shawn Perry said, "Taking five decades of Winter's music, both in the studio and on stage, and fitting the best of the best onto two CDs may not have been as easy as it sounds, but the results spread out over The Essential Johnny Winter are sure to give you a decent overview of what the man is about... Where you'll hear the best of everything about Johnny Winter is in the live performances slotted in throughout the set."

On Jambands.com, Ron Hart wrote, "There isn't a meaner white boy alive today who can match the scorchin' blues guitar of the great Johnny Winter.... If you are a novice to Winter's six-string stylings and could use an ample starting point, look no further than The Essential Johnny Winter two-disc set..."

== Track listing ==
Disc 1

1. "Rock Me Baby" (B.B. King, Arthur Crudup, Big Bill Broonzy, Curtis Jones) – 3:50
2. "Highway 61 Revisited" (Bob Dylan) – 5:07
3. "One Step at a Time" (Johnny Winter) – 3:59
4. "Leland Mississippi Blues" (Winter) – 3:29
5. "Rock and Roll, Hoochie Koo" (Rick Derringer) – 3:31
6. "TV Mama" (Lou Willie Turner) – 3:10
7. "Good Morning Little Schoolgirl (Live)" (Don Level, Bob Love) – 4:39
8. "Talk Is Cheap" (Winter) – 3:43
9. "Roll with Me (Live)" (Derringer) – 4:53
10. "Rock and Roll People" (John Lennon) – 2:45
11. "It's My Own Fault (Live)" (King, Jules Taub, John Lee Hooker) – 11:53
12. "Hustled down in Texas" (Winter) – 3:32
13. "Still Alive and Well" (Derringer) – 3:44
14. "Black Cat Bone (Live)" (Winter) – 5:44
15. "Honest I Do" (Jimmy Reed, Ewart Abner) – 4:20
16. "Bon Ton Roulet" (Clarence Garlow) – 4:44
17. "Johnny B. Goode (Live)" (Chuck Berry) – 3:42

Disc 2

1. "Mama, Talk to Your Daughter (Live Woodstock Version)" (J. B. Lenoir) – 4:57
2. "I'm Yours and I'm Hers" (Winter) – 4:30
3. "Rollin' Cross the Country" (Dan Hartman, Winter) – 4:31
4. "Bony Maronie (Live)" (Larry Williams) – 6:41
5. "Dallas" (Winter) – 2:45
6. "Miss Ann" (Little Richard, Enotris Johnson) – 3:40
7. "Self Destructive Blues" (Winter) – 3:27
8. "Be Careful with a Fool" (King, Joe Josea) – 5:15
9. "Mean Town Blues (Live Woodstock Version)" (Winter) – 10:57
10. "I'll Drown in My Tears" (Henry Glover) – 4:44
11. "Tired of Tryin'" (Winter) – 3:40
12. "Harlem Shuffle (Live with Edgar Winter)" (Earl Nelson, Bob Relf) – 3:38
13. "Sweet Papa John" (Winter) – 3:09
14. "Prodigal Son" (Winter) – 4:16
15. "Jumpin' Jack Flash (Live)" (Mick Jagger, Keith Richards) – 4:25
16. "Hurtin' So Bad" (Winter) – 4:39
17. "Rollin' and Tumblin' (Live)" (Muddy Waters, Hambone Willie Newbern) – 4:28
