= Rough Tough 'n' Ready =

Studio album by Hush
- Released: November 1975
- Recorded: Armstrong Studios, Melbourne
- Genre: Glam rock; hard rock
- Label: Wizard Records
- Producer: Robie Porter

Hush chronology
C'mon We're Taking Over (1974)	Rough Tough 'n' Ready (1975)	Nothing Stays the Same Forever (1976)

Singles from Rough Tough 'n' Ready
- 1. "Bony Moroney" Released: April 1975; 2. "Glad All Over" Released: September 1975; 3. "Rough Tough 'n' Ready"/"You Really Gotta Hold on Me" Released: February 1976

Rough Tough 'n' Ready is the fourth studio album by Australian rock group Hush. The album was released in November 1975 peaked at No. 15 and was certified quadruple gold on the Australian charts.

In an interview with Anthony O'Grady of Rock Australia Magazine on 2 January 1976, band member Les Gock said "We really put a lot work into it. It's really a whole different direction to C'mon We're Taking Over which is where we tried to experiment in the studio. This time we tried to get the band's stage sound onto record and it's worked pretty well I think. Like it's lot more straightforward than C'mon We're Taking Over, but on the other hand, the playing is a lot more controlled and better judged." adding "We really sweated over every detail of it. We worked out exactly what we wanted to do on it, how we wanted it to sound, what sort of energy level we wanted on it."

== Reception ==
Cash Box magazine said "The record is as subtle as a train wreck."

== Track listing ==
Side A (ZL 211)
No.	Title	Writer(s)	Length
1.	"Grand Prix"	Les Gock, Keith Lamb	4:47
2.	"Rough Tough 'n' Ready"	Gok, Lamb	3:49
3.	"China Doll"	Gok, Lamb	3:47
4.	"Spitfire"	Gok, Lamb	3:49

Side B
No.	Title	Writer(s)	Length
1.	"Glad All Over"	Dave Clark, Mike Smith	3:15
2.	"9 to 5'er"	Gok, Lamb	4:35
3.	"You've Really Got a Hold on Me"	Smokey Robinson	2:59
4.	"How Do You Feel? Alight!"	Gok, Lamb	3:47
5.	"Bony Moroney"	Larry Williams	3:07

== Charts ==
Chart (1975–1976)	Peak position
Australian Albums (Kent Music Report)	15
