= Bill Holford =

American singer-songwriter

- Bill Holford at ACA Studios, early 1960s

Background information
- Born: June 12, 1919; Bartlesville, Oklahoma, US
- Died: March 22, 1999 (aged 79) Houston, Texas, US
- Genres: Cajun, country, hillbilly, rockabilly, R&B, gospel, humor
- Occupations: Recording engineer, record producer
- Years active: 1948-1995
- Labels: Starday Records, Mercury Records, Bellaire Records, Sarg Records
- Formerly of: Audio Company of America

William Dwight Holford, Sr. (June 12, 1919, Bartlesville, Oklahoma – March 22, 1999, Houston, Texas) was an American recording engineer and record producer. For 44 of those years, from 1948 to 1992, he was the affiliated with ACA Studios (Audio Company of America) in Houston as an owner, partner, and audio engineer. Holford also helped build studios for several labels, including Duke/Peacock, Starday, Sarg Records, and Trumpet Records.

== ACA Studios ==
ACA was one of the earliest multi-track analog recording studios in the country.

=== ACA recording artists ===
- Johnny Ace
- Chet Atkins
- Bobby Bland
- Bill Blevins
- Juke Boy Bonner
- Clarence "Gatemouth" Brown
- Jewel "Teasin'" Brown
- Goree Carter
- Harry Choates
- Arnett Cobb
- Johnny Copeland
- David Honeyboy Edwards
- Five Blind Boys of Mississippi
- Lefty Frizzell
- Clarence Garlow
- Mickey Gilley
- Rosco Gordon
- Peppermint Harris
- Smokey Hogg
- Lightnin' Hopkins
- Ivory Joe Hunter
- Elmore James
- B.B. King
- The Kingston Trio
- Willie Love
- Frankie Miller
- Willie Nelson
- Eddie Noack
- Junior Parker
- Webb Pierce
- Really Red
- Little Richard
- Buster Pickens
- Jimmy Swan
- B.J. Thomas
- Big Mama Thornton
- Mitchell Torok
- Ernest Tubb and His Texas Troubadours
- Big Joe Turner
- T-Bone Walker
- Tag Williams
- Sonny Boy Williamson (aka Alex Miller)
- Hop Wilson
- Johnny Winter
- Justin Wilson

=== Labels that recorded at ACA ===
- Starday Records
- Mercury Records
- Peacock Records
- D Records
- Macy's Recordings
- ACA Records
- Arcadia
- Arhoolie
- Ayo
- Bellaire Records
- Columbia
- Cullum
- Decca
- De Luxe
- Delta Records
- Duke
- Excelsior
- FBC
- Freedom
- Herald
- H.M. Crowe
- Humble
- Imperial
- Kessler
- Martin
- MGM
- Natural
- Opera Record Company
- Paula Records
- Phamous
- RCA
- Revel
- Royalty
- Sarg Records
- Special Edition
- Trumpet

== Filmography ==
- Killing Fields (1984)

== ACA audio engineers and staff ==
- Kay Holford (Kathleen Assaf Holford, Bill's wife) had significant managerial responsibilities for the entire life of ACA Studios.
- Hank Lam: 1968–1972; engineer
- George Holsomback; born 1947, engineer from 1973 – 1974, chief engineer 1974–1978.
- Andy Bradley (born Andrew M. Bradley; 1951), audio engineer
- Sonny Ray Stolz (born Rae Roy Stolz; 1946), audio engineer and editor, among other things, helped Holford move from ACA's temporary location at Savoy Drive in Houston into the acquired defunct studios of Jimmy Duncan's Soundville at 8208 Westpark, Houston. Soundville Studios was a division of Jimmy Duncan Productions, Inc. Stolz worked for ACA from the summer of 1972 until early 1973.
- Bill Holford, jr.
