= Touché (Hush album) =

Studio album by Hush
- Released: July 1977
- Recorded: Armstrong Studios, Melbourne
- Label: Wizard Records
- Producer: Robie Porter

Hush chronology
Nothing Stays the Same Forever (1976)	Touché (1977)	The Best Of Hush (1995)

Singles from Touché
- 1. "Nothing Stays the Same Forever" Released: April 1977; 2. "Messin' Around" Released: September 1977

Touché is the fifth and final studio album by Australian rock group Hush. The album was released in July 1977 peaked at No. 36 on the Australian charts.

== Track listing ==
Side A (A Touch of Class) (ZL 221)
No.	Title	Writer(s)	Length
1.	"Nothing Stays the Same Forever"	Les Gock, Keith Lamb	5:40
2.	"A Touch of Decadence, A Touch of Class"	Gock, Lamb	4:33
3.	"Everywhere I Go"	Gock	3:03
4.	"Only Love"	Gock, Lamb	4:58

Side B (A Touch of Decadence)
No.	Title	Writer(s)	Length
1.	"Messin' Around"	Gock, Lamb	3:15
2.	"No. 1"	Gock, Lamb	3:30
3.	"Be Honest With Yourself"	Gock, Lamb	3:02
4.	"Something Tells Me Something's Wrong"	Gock, Lamb	6:13

== Personnel ==
- Keith Lamb — lead and backing vocals
- Les Gock — guitars, backing vocals, piano; lead vocals on "Everywhere I Go"
- Jacques de Jongh — bass, backing vocals; guitars on "A Touch of Decadence, A Touch of Class"
- Chris "Smiley" Pailthorpe — drums

== Charts ==
Chart (1977)	Peak position
Australian Albums (Kent Music Report)	36
