= Architecture (album) =

Studio album by Spahn Ranch
- Released: April 8, 1997
- Recorded: May 1996 – January 1997
- Studio: JLab Studio (Los Angeles, California)
- Genre: EBM; electro-industrial
- Length: 51:44
- Label: Cleopatra
- Producer: Matt Green; Judson Leach

Spahn Ranch chronology
In Parts Assembled Solely (1996)	Architecture (1997)	Retrofit EP (1997)

Alternative cover
- Architecture: Beta cover

Architecture is the third studio album by Spahn Ranch, released on April 8, 1997, by Cleopatra Records. After original member Rob Marton departed from the band, Christian Death drummer David Glass and drummer Harry Lewis joined the Spahn Ranch to further experiment with the band's fusion dark wave and industrial music. Critics have called it one of Spahn Ranch's most influential and experimental albums for its incorporation of drum and bass, dub and live guitar.

== Reception ==
Professional ratings
Review scores
Source	Rating
Allmusic	4/5 stars

Aiding & Abetting compared praised the album for its expression of gothic music influences "The Coiled One anticipated the big gothic surge, and so Architecture is poised to cash in on the big electronic wave that is just now reaching shore." Allmusic critic Mike Pfeiffer described it as the Spahn Ranch's strongest album and said "Architecture shows a departure from gloom and an embrace of intelligent electronic rhythm styles like drum'n'bass and electro." Last Sigh Magazine said "this is somewhat of a departure from The Coiled One, but nevertheless a step ahead in Spahn Ranch's successful music" and "what is really excellent about this album is the instrumentals that Spahn Ranch provides the listener with." A critic at Lollipop Magazine, Angela Dauthi, called the album an improvement over their previous work, saying "the songs take on electronica drum beats and fills while throwing in dissonant keyboard glissandos with cool, detached lyrics" and "while their last two albums had stripped everything down to a pumping beat and noisy vocals, Architecture takes a sharp left turn and punches the gas." Option called the album "eminently listenable, even the darker Gothic tones are opened up, creating music that sounds more like songs than exercises in mood." Critic Dave Thompson said "a cover of the Equals "Black Skinned Blue Eyed Boys" is positively ecstatic, pulsing sonics which throb with a literal passion" and "several tracks (most notably "Futurist Limited") echo elements of Depeche Mode, sans that band's congealing precociousness, while "Incubate" takes Hammer's "Can't Touch This" motif into Kraftwerkian territory to stunning effect."

Chris Best of Lollipop Magazine gave the album a mixed review and said "there are some great tunes on this disc, but the electronica bits are stale and dated (as in techno circa 1990 or anything by 2 Unlimited)." Sonic Boom criticized the album for being incohesive but said "a casual flip through all of the tracks provide for a dizzying array of genre hopping from trance, drum & bass, disco, ballads, to even a cover version of the Equals, 'Black Skinned Blue Eyed Boys'."

== Track listing ==
All lyrics are written by Athan Maroulis, except "Black Skinned Blue Eyed Boys" by Eddy Grant

No.	Title	Music	Length
1.	"Monochrome"	Green; Maroulis	3:50
2.	"Black Skinned Blue Eyed Boys" (The Equals cover)	Eddy Grant	3:31
3.	"In the Aftermath"	Green; Maroulis	5:13
4.	"Futurist Limited"	Green; Maroulis	3:52
5.	"Incubate"	Green	4:04
6.	"Embodied"	Green; Maroulis	5:34
7.	"A Depression Glass"	Green; Maroulis	4:26
8.	"U Tell Em U"	Green; Raven	5:27
9.	"Futurist Unlimited"	Green; Maroulis	4:26
10.	"Laurels"	Green; Maroulis	5:17
11.	"The Catalyst"	Green; Maroulis	4:03
12.	"Solace"	Green	2:02

Architecture: Beta bonus tracks
No.	Title	Music	Length
13.	"Heretic's Fork"	Green; Maroulis; Rob Morton	4:43
14.	"Locusts"	Green; Maroulis	3:59
15.	"Vortex"	Green; Maroulis	4:07
16.	"The Judas Cradle"	Green; Maroulis	3:56
17.	"Static Detonates the Gel"	Green	3:32

== Accolades ==
Year	Publication	Country	Accolade	Rank
1996	CMJ New Music Monthly	United States	"Top 25 Dance"	7
"*" denotes an unordered list.

== Personnel ==
Adapted from the Architecture liner notes.

Spahn Ranch

- Matt Green – sampler, synthesizer, drum programming, production, mixing
- Harry Lewis – percussion
- Athan Maroulis – lead vocals

Additional performers

- Daniel Bryan Harvey – guitar (2, 4, 6, 9)
- David Parkinson – percussion
- Paul Raven – bass guitar (2, 6, 7), loops and additional synthesizer (8)

Production and design

- T.J. Barrial – photography
- Atelier³ D Thom Bissett – design
- Judson Leach – production, engineering, mixing, mastering

== Release history ==
Region	Date	Label	Format	Catalog
United States	1997	Cleopatra	CD	CLP 9977
United States	1997	Out Of Line/Sub/Mission	CD	OUT 016, CD WHIP 036
