= Here's Larry Williams =

Studio album by Larry Williams
- Released: 1959
- Genre: R&B; rock and roll
- Length: 25:54
- Label: Specialty

Larry Williams chronology
Here's Larry Williams (1959)	Slow Down with Larry Williams (The Missing and Unissued Sides) (1960)

Here's Larry Williams is the debut studio album by American singer-songwriter Larry Williams, released by Specialty Records in 1959. The album includes two of Williams's hit singles, "Short Fat Fannie" and "Bony Moronie", and also features the song "Dizzy, Miss Lizzy", which would later be covered by the Beatles.

== Critical reception ==
Professional ratings
Review scores
Source	Rating
AllMusic	4.5/5 stars

AllMusic's Stewart Mason wrote of the album: "Listening to these tracks, it's clear why John Lennon was such a huge Larry Williams fan; his rough-and-ready no-bull voice is elastic enough to move from a Little Richard trill to a Ray Charles growl, and songs like 'Dizzy, Miss Lizzy' and 'Short Fat Fannie' are raucous enough to be punk rock nearly a full two decades before the concept was even in existence."

== Track listing ==
Side one
No.	Title	Length
1.	"Short Fat Fannie"	2:21
2.	"Make a Little Love"	1:59
3.	"Hootchy-Koo"	2:32
4.	"Lawdy Miss Clawdy"	2:10
5.	"Peaches and Cream"	1:59
6.	"Give Me Love"	2:00
Total length:		13:01

Side two
No.	Title	Length
1.	"Bony Moronie"	2:40
2.	"Little School Girl"	1:51
3.	"Dizzy, Miss Lizzy"	2:09
4.	"Teardrops"	2:20
5.	"You Bug Me, Baby"	1:50
6.	"Ting a Ling"	2:03
Total length:		12:53
