= The Colours of Zoth Ommog =

Compilation album by Various artists
- Released: 1994
- Genre: Electro-industrial; EDM
- Length: 74:09
- Label: Zoth Ommog

The Colours of Zoth Ommog is a various artists compilation album released in 1994 by Zoth Ommog Records. Songs by Blok 57, Leæther Strip, Lights of Euphoria, Mentallo & The Fixer, Psychopomps, Spahn Ranch and X Marks the Pedwalk were previously unreleased in the bands' main discography. Spahn Ranch's "Failsafe", which later appeared on their compilation is incorrectly listed in the liner noted as being from the Breath and Taxes EP.

== Reception ==
Music From the Empty Quarter recommended The Colours of Zoth Ommog and said "Zoth Ommog's compilations generally give a good insight into the full-length offerings on the label."

== Track listing ==
| No. | Title | Writer(s) | Artist | Length |
|---|---|---|---|---|
| 1. | "Riot 26" | Guy Van Mieghem | Blok 57 | 4:12 |
| 2. | "Grim Reality" (Grimpen Ward Remix) | Dwayne Dassing; Gary Dassing | Mentallo & The Fixer | 8:32 |
| 3. | "No Premonition" (Re–Edit) | Sevren Ni-Arb | X Marks the Pedwalk | 6:24 |
| 4. | "Murder/Getting Away With It" (Original G.A.W.M.-Demo-Version) | Claus Larsen | Leæther Strip | 4:08 |
| 5. | "Für Immer" (F.I.S.-Remix) | Martin Bodewell; Lars Felker | Orange Sector | 5:02 |
| 6. | "Oh Funny Man" | Dirk Krause; Uwe Kanka | Armageddon Dildos | 3:40 |
| 7. | "Failsafe" | Matt Green; Judson Leach | Spahn Ranch | 4:37 |
| 8. | "Beater" | Jeremy Daw | Yeht Mae | 5:18 |
| 9. | "Akhenaton" | Roberto A. Mendoza; Pepe Mogt; Melo Ruíz | Artefakto | 3:28 |
| 10. | "The World Inside" (Reality Mix) | David Duddleston; Jeremy Wells | Violet Arcana | 6:59 |
| 11. | "One" (George Hagegeorge Funky Mix) | Thomas Franzmann; Markus Nikolai | Bigod 20 | 5:02 |
| 12. | "Steam Engine" | Sascha Kurz | Zero Defects | 6:17 |
| 13. | "Take One" (Argon Edit) | Torben Schmidt | Lights of Euphoria | 4:33 |
| 14. | "Doggy Style (X-Rated)" | Flemming Norre Larsen; Jesper Schmidt | Psychopomps | 5:57 |

== Personnel ==
Adapted from The Colours of Zoth Ommog liner notes.

- Vernon Baur – photography
- Michael Goolaerts – additional guitar (1)
- Hype Graphics – design
- George Hagegeorge – remixer (11)
- Sevren Ni-Arb – remixer (5)
- Thorsten Marx – production (12)

== Release history ==
| Region | Date | Label | Format | Catalog |
|---|---|---|---|---|
| United States | 1994 | Zoth Ommog | CD | ZOT 121 |
