= Kenneth, what is the frequency? (disambiguation) =

"Kenneth, what is the frequency?" is a question asked to news anchor Dan Rather by an assailant in 1986.

Kenneth, what is the frequency? and variants may also refer to:

- "What's the Frequency, Kenneth?", a 1994 song by R.E.M.
- "Kenneth – What's the Frequency?", a 1987 song by Game Theory on Lolita Nation
- "Kenneth, What's the Frequency?", a 1994 song by Spahn Ranch on The Blackmail Starters Kit
