= Retrofit EP =

EP of remixes by Spahn Ranch
- Released: March 3, 1998
- Genre: Industrial
- Length: 24:36
- Label: Cleopatra

Spahn Ranch chronology
Architecture (1997)	Retrofit EP (1998)	Beat Noir (1998)

Alternative cover
- CD cover

Retrofit EP is the fifth EP by Spahn Ranch, released on March 3, 1998 by Cleopatra Records.

== Reception ==
Professional ratings
Review scores
Source	Rating
Allmusic	2.5/5 stars

Jon Worley of Aiding & Abetting commended Retrofit EP for packaging remixes that sound different from their original source. AllMusic critic Mike Pfeiffer gave the gave two and a half out of five stars and said "it's arguably Spahn Ranch's most dance-oriented effort yet." Sonic Boom called the album "a fine collection of Trance, Dub, Drum'n'Bass, and Jungle mixes of classic Spahn Ranch tunes."

== Track listing ==
All lyrics are written by Athan Maroulis.

Side one
No.	Title	Music	Remixer(s)	Length
1.	"U Tell Em U" (Matt's Righteous Mix)	Green; Raven	Matt Green	5:27
2.	"In the Aftermath" (Astralasia Mix)	Green; Athan Maroulis	Astralasia	6:34

Side two
No.	Title	Music	Remixer(s)	Length
1.	"In the Aftermath" (LCD Mix)	Green; Maroulis	LCD	7:31
2.	"Black Skinned Blue Eyed Boys" (David Harrow Mix) (The Equals cover)	Eddy Grant	David Harrow	5:04

CD track listing
No.	Title	Music	Remixer(s)	Length
1.	"In the Aftermath" (Astralasia Mix)	Matt Green; Athan Maroulis	Astralasia	6:34
2.	"Black Skinned Blue Eyed Boys" (David Harrow Mix) (The Equals cover)	Eddy Grant	David Harrow	5:04
3.	"U Tell Em U" (Matt's Righteous Mix)	Green; Raven	Matt Green	5:27
4.	"In the Aftermath" (LCD Mix)	Matt Green, Athan Maroulis	LCD	7:31
5.	"Monochrome" (JLAB Eugenics Mix)	Green; Maroulis	Athan Maroulis, Judson Leach	3:49
6.	"Black Skinned Blue Eyed Boys" (Transmutator Mix)	Grant	Transmutator	4:01
7.	"Monochrome" (Databomb Mix)	Green; Maroulis	Databomb	4:34
8.	"Incubate" (Play Music Mix)	Green	Matt Green	4:06
9.	"Architecture in Dub" (I. Scarpa II. Fuller III. Wright)	Green	Matt Green	13:46
10.	"In the Aftermath" (Earthshock Mix)	Green; Maroulis	Earthshock	5:57

== Personnel ==
Adapted from the Retrofit EP liner notes.

Spahn Ranch

- Matt Green – sampler, keyboards, production and mixing (8)
- Harry Lewis – percussion
- Athan Maroulis – lead vocals

Additional performers

- David Parkinson (as David Glass) – percussion (8)

Production and design

- T.J. Barrial – photography
- Atelier³ D Thom Bissett – design
- Eric Fahlborg – mastering

== Release history ==
Region	Date	Label	Format	Catalog
United States	1998	Cleopatra	LP	
United States	1998	Cleopatra	CD	CLP 0195
Germany	1998	Out of Line/Sub/Mission	CD	OUT 019, cd WHIP038
