= Trance in Your Mind: The Unstoppable Trance Machine =

Compilation album by Various artists
- Released: September 13, 1994
- Genre: Electro-industrial; EDM
- Length: 64:53
- Label: Cleopatra

Trance in Your Mind: The Unstoppable Trance Machine is a various artists compilation album released on September 13, 1994, by Cleopatra Records.

== Track listing ==
No.	Title	Writer(s)	Artist	Length
1.	"Argon"	Jan Kjølhede Meedom; Jesper Løksa	Oga Syndicate	8:25
2.	"Turn Up the Music" (Leæther Bunny Mix)	Julius Agami; Kenneth Bager; Christine Christiansen; Kenn Haunstoft	Dr. Baker	5:05
3.	"Binary Experience" (Re–Edit)	Rasmus Kunckel; Anders Schroeder	Binary Experience	7:03
4.	"Crack" (Free Bass Mix)	Jean-Claude Cutz; Heiki Sillaste	Digital Poodle	7:05
5.	"Reinventing Gravity"	Rob Morton	Coersion	3:55
6.	"Sample Your Mind" (Vector Mix)	Kenneth Abildgaard	Bass Complex	8:31
7.	"Bi Minis"	Cutz	DIN	3:24
8.	"Weirdo"	Don Behm; Rob Levally; Jed Robertson; Matthew Taplinger	Halon	5:14
9.	"Akhenaton"	Meedom; Thomas Wind	Procyon Project	7:57
10.	"The World Inside" (Acid Vol. 3)	Peter Candy; Frank Madsen	Koxbox	8:14

== Personnel ==
Adapted from the Trance in Your Mind: The Unstoppable Trance Machine liner notes.

- Claus Larsen – remixer and additional production (2)

== Release history ==
Region	Date	Label	Format	Catalog
United States	1994	Cleopatra	CD	CLEO 9414
