= Raisin' Cain =

1980 studio album by Johnny Winter

Studio album by Johnny Winter
- Released: May 1980
- Genres: Rock, blues
- Length: 43:05
- Label: Blue Sky
- Producers: Johnny Winter, Dave Still

Johnny Winter chronology
White, Hot and Blue (1978)	Raisin' Cain (1980)	Guitar Slinger (1984)

Raisin' Cain is an album by Johnny Winter, released in 1980 by Blue Sky Records. A retrospective album review for AllMusic by William Ruhlmann notes the mix of rock and roll, Chicago blues, and New Orleans rhythm and blues/New Orleans blues tunes lacks any compositions by Winter. Ruhlmann gave the album three out of five stars and concluded:

The water-treading of Raisin' Cain suggests that a new approach is in order, maybe an outside producer who can bring a different perspective or somebody to look for good songs (instead of the two mediocre ones written by Winter's bass player that are here), if the artist isn't going to write his own material.

Professional ratings
Review scores
Source	Rating
AllMusic	3/5 stars

== Track listing ==
Side1

1. "The Crawl" (Raymond Victorica, Wayne Shuler) – 2:05
2. "Sittin' in the Jail House" (Robert Ross) – 3:19
3. "Like a Rolling Stone" (Bob Dylan) – 5:35
4. "New York, New York" (Rob Stoner) – 5:10
5. "Bon Ton Roulet" (Clarence Garlow) – 4:43

Side 2

1. "Rollin' and Tumblin'" (McKinley Morganfield) – 3:25
2. "Talk Is Cheap" (Jim Liban) – 3:40
3. "Wolf in Sheep's Clothing" (Jon Paris) – 5:30
4. "Don't Hide Your Love" (Jon Paris) – 3:26
5. "Mother-in-Law Blues" (Don Robey) – 2:53
6. "Walkin' Slowly" (Earl "Connelly" King) – 3:19

== Personnel ==
- Johnny Winter – guitar, vocals
- Jon Paris – bass, guitar, harmonica
- Bobby Torello – drums
- Tom Strohman – saxophone
- Dan Hartman – piano
- Dave Still – tambourine
