= Beat Noir =

Studio album by Spahn Ranch
- Released: October 19, 1998
- Recorded: February – August 1998
- Studio: H & H Productions (Mundelein, Illinois)
- Genre: Electro-industrial; EBM
- Length: 45:51
- Label: Out of Line/Sub/Mission
- Producer: Matt Green

Spahn Ranch chronology
Retrofit EP (1998)	Beat Noir (1998)	Anthology 1992-1994 (2000)

Alternative cover
- Cleopatra edition cover

Beat Noir is the fourth studio album by Spahn Ranch, released on October 19, 1998, by Out of Line and Sub/Mission Records. It was reissued on November 24 of that year by Cleopatra Records. The final track "An Exit" was licensed to Cleopatra Records to be released on the various artists compilation The Black Bible in 1998.

== Reception ==
Professional ratings
Review scores
Source	Rating
AllMusic	2.5/5 stars

AllMusic gave Beat Noir gave two and a half out of five possible stars. Music critic Dave Thompson said "from the infectious opening riff of "Fire Lives in the Hearts of All Men," to the near reverent melodies entwined within the synth structure of "Ride like Lightning Crash like Thunder," a tight, edgy, yet absolutely hummable album that is solid throughout." Ink 19 was negatively critical of the album's misdirected experimentation and claimed that Athan Maroulis' vocal choices were unsuited for the album's genre.

== Track listing ==
No.	Title	Writer(s)	Length
1.	"Fire Lives in the Hearts of All Men"	Matt Green; Eric Powell	4:41
2.	"Remnants"	Green; Maroulis	5:25
3.	"Rationale"	Green; Maroulis	4:38
4.	"The Warmth of Silence"	Green; Maroulis	4:38
5.	"Ride Like Lightning Crash Like Thunder"	Green	4:50
6.	"Dubnosis"	Green	4:21
7.	"The Conversation"	Green; Maroulis	4:46
8.	"Test My Reaction"	Green; Maroulis	4:11
9.	"Well Charged"	Green	4:12
10.	"An Exit"	Green; Maroulis	4:10

== Accolades ==
Year	Publication	Country	Accolade	Rank
1998	CMJ New Music Monthly	United States	"Top 25 Dance"	7
1998	CMJ New Music Monthly	United States	"CMJ Radio 200"	130
1998	CMJ New Music Monthly	United States	"RPM"	9
"*" denotes an unordered list.

== Personnel ==
Adapted from the Beat Noir liner notes.

Spahn Ranch

- Matt Green – programming, keyboards, production, mixing
- Harry Lewis – percussion
- Athan Maroulis – lead vocals

Additional performers

- David J – bass guitar (6, 10)
- Eric Powell – programming (1)

Production and design

- Mick Cripps – design
- Eric Fahlborg – mastering
- Steve Tushar – engineering, mixing

== Release history ==
Region	Date	Label	Format	Catalog
Germany	1998	Out of Line/Sub/Mission	CD	OUT 029, cd WHIP047
United States	1998	Cleopatra	CD	CLP 0420
