= Closure (Spahn Ranch album) =

Studio album by Spahn Ranch
- Released: February 6, 2001
- Recorded: August 2000
- Genre: Electronic
- Length: 43:48
- Label: Cleopatra
- Producer: Matt Green

Spahn Ranch chronology
| Anthology 1992-1994 (2000) | Closure (2001) |

Closure is fifth and final studio album by Spahn Ranch, released on February 6, 2001, by Cleopatra Records.

== Reception ==
Professional ratings
Review scores
| Source | Rating |
|---|---|
| Allmusic | 4/5 stars |

AllMusic awarded Closure four out of five stars, with its review by Alex Henderson saying "'Destruction' and 'Mind Over Matter' are relevant to the industrial-dance and EBM scenes, but, overall, the material is much closer to goth rock's brooding sorrow than industrial's in-your-face anger — and that is true of original songs like 'The Last Laugh' and 'Reasons' as well as an unlikely cover of P.J. Harvey's 'The River,' which is a radical departure from her version and works surprisingly well in a dark wave setting." In writing for Electrogarden, critic Michael Casano awarded the album a ten.

== Track listing ==
| No. | Title | Music | Length |
|---|---|---|---|
| 1. | "Reasons" | Matt Green; Athan Maroulis | 5:24 |
| 2. | "The River" | PJ Harvey | 4:47 |
| 3. | "Destruction" | Green; Maroulis | 4:16 |
| 4. | "The Missing Frame" | Green; Maroulis | 5:03 |
| 5. | "Born on a Ray of Sound" | Green | 3:41 |
| 6. | "Phase" | Green; Maroulis | 4:18 |
| 7. | "The Last Laugh" | Green; Maroulis | 3:52 |
| 8. | "Flash Forward" | Green | 3:48 |
| 9. | "Mind Over Matter" | Green | 4:00 |
| 10. | "A Picture" | Green; Maroulis | 4:39 |

UK CD bonus tracks
| No. | Title | Music | Length |
|---|---|---|---|
| 11. | "Swim" | Madonna | 4:34 |
| 12. | "Magellan" | Green | 5:20 |
| 13. | "Version Excursion" | Green | 3:33 |

== Personnel ==
Adapted from the Closure liner notes.

Spahn Ranch

- Matt Green – guitar, keyboards, melodica, programming, production, engineering, mixing
- Harry Lewis – percussion
- Athan Maroulis – lead vocals, art direction, photography

Additional performers

- Daniel Bryan Harvey – guitar on tracks 2,4

Production and design

- Mark Blasquez – mix doctor on track 3
- Judson Leach – mastering
- Eunah Lee – design

== Release history ==
| Region | Date | Label | Format | Catalog |
|---|---|---|---|---|
| United States | 2001 | CD | Cleopatra | CLP 0420 |
| United Kingdom | 2001 | CD | Cryonica Music | CRYCD005 |
