= Dizzy, Miss Lizzy =

Original song written and composed by Larry Williams

- US picture sleeve

Single by Larry Williams
- B-side: "Slow Down"
- Released: March 1958
- Recorded: February 19, 1958
- Studio: Radio Recorders, Hollywood, California
- Genre: Rock and roll
- Length: 2:25
- Label: Specialty
- Songwriter: Larry Williams

Larry Williams singles chronology
"Bony Moronie" (1957)	"Dizzy, Miss Lizzy" (1958)	"Hootchy-Koo" / "The Dummy" (1958)

"Dizzy, Miss Lizzy" is a rock and roll song written and recorded by Larry Williams in 1958. Although identified as a "genuine rock & roll classic", it had limited success on the record charts. Seven years later, the Beatles recorded the song, and John Lennon performed it with the Plastic Ono Band in 1969.

== Recording ==
At the end of 1957, Williams scored with one of his biggest hits, "Bony Moronie". On February 19, 1958, he entered the Radio Recorders studio in Hollywood, California, to record a potential follow-up. He was again backed by some well-known session musicians, including René Hall, who is credited as the band leader and with supplying the distinctive guitar riff. However, it is Williams' vocal that makes the song stand out, according to music journalist Gene Sculatti, "at ease with its own intensity [that is] finally out of Richard's shadow." (Little Richard and Williams were both signed to Specialty Records).

== Release and charts ==
Specialty released "Dizzy, Miss Lizzy" in both the 78 rpm and newer 45 rpm record formats. Williams had several completed recordings to choose from for the B-side, but the label decided to go with "Slow Down", a track he had recorded at the same September 11, 1957, session that produced "Bony Moronie". Both sides received notices in Billboard magazine, but only "Dizzy, Miss Lizzy" reached the "Top 100 Sides" chart. It peaked at number 69 during the week ending April 19, 1958. Both songs were included on Williams's first album, the Specialty compilation Here's Larry Williams (1959).

== Personnel ==
- Larry Williams – vocals, piano
- Earl Palmer – drums
- René Hall – guitar
- Howard Roberts – guitar
- Ted Brinson – bass guitar
- Plas Johnson – tenor sax
- Jewell Grant – baritone sax

== The Beatles rendition ==
"Dizzy Miss Lizzy"
- Netherlands picture sleeve

Song by the Beatles
- Released: June 14, 1965 (US Beatles VI); August 6, 1965 (UK Help! edition)
- Recorded: May 10, 1965
- Studio: EMI, London
- Genre: Rock and roll
- Length: 2:54
- Label: Parlophone (UK); Capitol (US)
- Songwriter: Larry Williams
- Producer: George Martin

In 1965, the Beatles recorded "Dizzy Miss Lizzy" in response to requests from Capitol Records (their US record label) for new material. The song, recorded the previous year by another Liverpool group The Escorts, is included on the UK album Help! and the US album Beatles VI. They recorded it along with another Williams tune, "Bad Boy", on the same day.

Group biographer Ian MacDonald describes the song as "an unprepossessing shambles of ersatz hysteria and jumbled double-tracking". However, AllMusic's Stephen Thomas Erlewine comments "'Dizzy Miss Lizzy' gives John an opportunity to flex his rock & roll muscle."

Lennon later recorded "Dizzy Miss Lizzy" at a performance at the Toronto Rock and Roll Revival on September 13, 1969. The song is included on the Plastic Ono Band album Live Peace in Toronto 1969.

=== The Beatles personnel ===
In Revolution in the Head, MacDonald lists the following:

- John Lennon – vocal, rhythm guitar, Vox Continental organ
- Paul McCartney – bass
- George Harrison – double-tracked lead guitar
- Ringo Starr – drums, cowbell
