= Melvin Jackson =

American blues guitarist (1915–1976)

- Born: August 16, 1915; Tyler, Texas, U.S.
- Died: May 30, 1976 (aged 60) Dallas, Texas, U.S.
- Genres: Blues
- Occupation(s): Musician, singer
- Instrument: Guitar
- Years active: 1946–1955, 1960
- Labels: Gold Star; Imperial; Arhoolie

Melvin "Lil' Son" Jackson (August 16, 1915 – May 30, 1976) was an American blues guitarist and singer. He was a contemporary of Lightnin' Hopkins.

== Biography ==
Jackson was born in Tyler, Texas, U.S. Jackson's mother played gospel guitar, and he played early on in a gospel group, the Blue Eagle Four. He became a mechanic and served in the U.S. Army during World War II, after which he pursued a career as a blues musician. He recorded a demo and sent it to Bill Quinn, the owner of Gold Star Records, in 1946. Quinn signed him to a recording contract and released "Freedom Train Blues" in 1948, which became a nationwide hit in the U.S. Jackson recorded for Imperial Records between 1950 and 1954, both as a solo artist and with a backing band. His 1950 song "Rockin' and Rollin" was recast by later musicians as "Rock Me Baby". In 1951, Quinn shuttered the Gold Star label and sold or leased his catalogue of master recordings to other labels, with Modern Records buying 32 unreleased Jackson and Lightnin' Hopkins masters for $2,500.

Jackson was injured in a car crash in the mid-1950s and gave up his music career, returning to work as a mechanic. He recorded an album for Arhoolie Records in 1960, but did not resume his career as a musician during the blues revival in the 1960s. He died of cancer in 1976 in Dallas, at the age of 60. Eric Clapton recorded Jackson's "Travelin' Alone", for his 2010 album, Clapton.
