= Jole Blon =

Traditional Cajun waltz

"Jole Blon" or "Jolie Blonde" is a traditional Cajun waltz, often called "the Cajun national anthem" because of the popularity it has in Cajun culture. The song was popularized on a nationwide scale by a series of renditions and references in late 1940s country songs. It has been the subject of occasional covers later in the 20th century by Cajun and classic country revival bands.

McNeese State University adopted "Joli Blon" as their official fight song in 1970, having been a part of the university band's repertoire since 1951. It is played by the "Pride of McNeese" band upon scoring at athletic events.

== Music ==
=== Origins ===
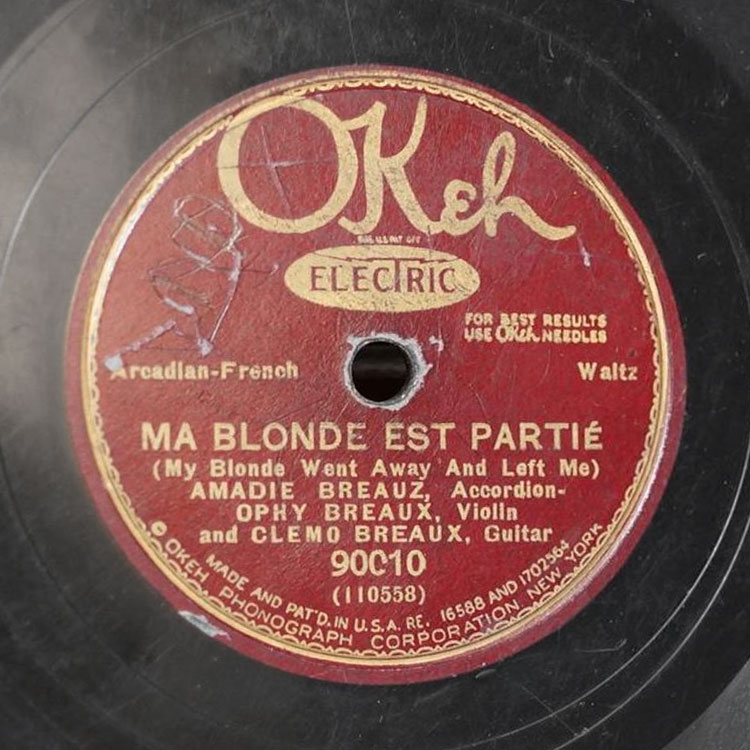
The 1929 recording of "Ma blonde est partié" by the Breaux Brothers

The original Cajun version is a brief address to a "pretty girlfriend", who had left the singer and moved back in with her family, and is also now in the arms of another man. The singer concludes that plenty of other pretty women are around. The fiddle-based melody dates to before the 1900s.

The earliest recording of the song is believed to be a 1929 version by the family trio Breaux Brothers entitled "Ma blonde est partié", recorded in Atlanta. Some mystery exists to its origin. While Amedée Breaux is credited with writing the song, his sister Cleoma actually wrote the lyrics and Amedée sang the song. Dennis McGee claims the original song was written by Angelas LeJeune as "La fille de la veuve" (also "La valse de la veuve") ("The Widow's Daughter/Waltz") during World War I and Cleoma rewrote the lyrics, allegedly about Amedée's first wife. Lejeune and Ernest Fruge eventually recorded this song on November 19, 1929, in New Orleans (Brunswick 558, Melotone M18052). In 1934, Alan Lomax traveled to Louisiana and recorded several artists, including the Segura Brothers and their version of "La Fille de la Veuve".

In January 1929, John Bertrand and Milton Pitre traveled to Chicago and recorded "La Valse de Gueydan" for Paramount Records (12748A), using the same melody. It appeared again in a 1930 recording of "La Valse de Gueydan" (Brunswick 513) by Amade Ardoin. Dennis McGee and he traveled to New Orleans and recorded this song discussing a "small young girl". This version was re-recorded with slightly different lyrics by Leo Soileau and his Three Aces. The title was "La Valse Gueydan [Jolie Fille]", recorded by Bluebird (B-2086) on January 18, 1935.

- "La Valse de Gueydan" by John Bertrand Listen (MP3)

The following year, the song appeared with the title "Jolie Blonde" for the first time on two records. Both the Hackberry Ramblers and J. B. Fuselier and his Merrymakers traveled to New Orleans and recorded the song on October 17, 1936, for Bluebird Records. J.B. Fuselier named the song "Te Ma Lessa Jolie Blonde" (Bluebird B-2006) and the Hackberry Ramblers simplified the name to "Jolie Blonde" (Bluebird B-2003).

By 1937, the melody was popular among very small regions of Louisiana. On Feb 21, the Jolly Boys of Lafayette traveled to Dallas and recorded "Jolie (Brunette)" for Decca (#17032), a similar take on the song with different lyrics. Later in the year, Happy Fats traveled to New Orleans and recorded "Nouveau Grand Gueyan" for Bluebird (B-2024).

In 1951, Amede Breaux formed the band Acadian Aces and recorded the song with the title "Jole Blonde" for J. D. "Jay" Miller's Feature Records (F-1023).

- "Ma blonde est partie" by Amedée Breaux and Cleoma Breaux Listen (MP3)
- "Jolie Blonde" by Amede Breaux Listen (MP3)

Rod Bernard recorded an English-language adaptation of the song in 1964 on the Tear Drop label.

=== Country popularization ===
During the late 1940s, as country's nationwide market had solidified, a number of country artists popularized the song "Jole Blon". The popularization began in 1946 with Harry Choates and his French version of "Jole Blon" for Gold Star Records. Unable to produce enough copies of the record with his own one-man pressing plant, studio and label owner Bill Quinn arranged a licensing agreement with Modern Records to handle the pressing, distribution, and promotion of the hit single, which was eventually be leased and reissued on other independent labels across the country, such as Modern Records (#20-511), Starday(#187), D Records (#1024) and the Deluxe label. Later, Choates recorded an English version and several different versions for different labels.

"Jole Blon" (1946 recording) Listen (MP3)

As is not infrequent in country music, once a song is popularized, several other contemporaries covered it. In this case, covers commonly were not so much reproductions as they were songs in the same spirit, making use of the same subject, melody, or Cajun theme. Several of them used "Jole Blon" as the name of subject of the song, instead of using the original “Jolie blonde” meaning pretty girlfriend.

Many of the covers included self-referential humor in regard to the production context of the song. A popular rendition, first published by Moon Mullican (and Moon Mullican's first major hit), consists of a purposeful mix of unrelated English, French, and nonsense words: a joke attempt at "translation" of the original. Johnny Bond's "The Daughter of Jole Blon" exemplifies this contextual humor, describing the titular character as "so round, so firm, so fully packed" (itself the title of a popular country song at the time), and "Jole's only daughter... but she knows all the tricks that Jole taught her."

The following contemporary artists' renditions or songs make reference to "Jole Blon". Listed next to each song is if, and the year when, that version reached the Billboard 100 for country at the time (The country Billboard charts began in 1946).

- Harry Choates: "Jole Blon" (Billboard Country Top 100 1947)
- Roy Acuff: "(Our Own) Jole Blon" (Billboard Country Top 100 1947)
- Red Foley: "New Jolie Blonde" (Billboard Country Top 100 1947)
- Moon Mullican and the Showboys: "New Pretty Blonde (New Jole Blon)" (Billboard Country Top 100 1947)
- Moon Mullican: "Jole Blon's Sister" (Billboard Country Top 100 1947)
- Johnny Bond: "The Daughter of Jole Blon" (Billboard Country Top 100 1947)
- Cliffie Stone: "Peepin' Through The Keyhole" (Billboard Country Top 100 1948) – in this song, the chorus announces that the singer learned how to dance by "peeping through the keyhole at Jole Blon".
- Bud Messner: "Slippin' Around With Jole Blon" (Billboard Country Top 100 1950)
- Kenny Rogers 1958 45rpm on ' Ken-Lee' label, Number 3829 (Lyrics attributed to " Buddy Dee) - (B side: ' Lonley").
- Waylon Jennings recorded it as his debut single in 1958 with Buddy Holly on guitar and King Curtis on saxophone.

=== Late 20th century and recent covers ===
Some recent covers of the song have been made by Cajun revival and popular artists, though these have not enjoyed the same widespread popularity. The following are some of the artists who have covered "Jole Blon":

- The Balham Alligators.
- Gary U.S. Bonds and Bruce Springsteen. Springsteen had originally recorded the song for his 1980 album The River, but it was never released and he decided to re-record the song with Bonds for the latter's 1981 album Dedication. Since then, Springsteen has occasionally performed the song live.
- The Flatlanders.
- Joan Baez included a recording of the song on her 1970 album (I Live) One Day at a Time.

In 2002, Bear Family records released Jole Blon: 23 Artists One Theme. In 2009, an unknown publisher, T. Basco, released a three-volume set called Peepin' Thru the Keyhole, which contains virtually every version of "Jolie Blonde" that has ever been recorded and popularized. In 2013, Goldenlane Records released Jole Blon and the Cajun Music Story compilation CD with many of the popular versions.

The title of the song is referenced in Mary Chapin Carpenter's 1991 song "Down at the Twist and Shout" and Adam Carroll's 2000 song "Errol's Song".

== Art ==
In 1974, artist George Rodrigue painted several iconic portraits of his vision of what Jolie Blonde would have looked like. His paintings can be found in Jolie's Louisiana Bistro in Lafayette, Louisiana. Rodrigue claims the origins of "Jolie Blonde" stem from a prisoner in Port Arthur, Texas, whose lover left him for someone else.
