= Bon Ton Roula =

Song written by Clarenece Garlow

Single by Clarence Garlow
- B-side: "In a Boogie Mood"
- Released: 1950
- Recorded: Houston, Texas, 1949
- Genre: Blues, zydeco
- Length: 3:19
- Label: Macy's
- Songwriter: Clarence Garlow

Clarence Garlow singles chronology
"She's So Fine" (1950)	"Bon Ton Roula" (1950)	"Bound to Lose My Mind" (1950)

"Bon Ton Roula" (alternatively "Bon Ton Roulet") is a zydeco-influenced blues song first recorded by Clarence Garlow in 1949. The following year, it became a hit, reaching number seven in Billboard magazine's Rhythm & Blues chart and introduced the style to a national audience.

== Background ==
"Bon ton roula" (pronounced "bahn tahn roolay") is a phonetical approximation of "bons temps rouler", Louisiana Creole French for "good times roll" as in "Laissez les bons temps rouler" or "Let the good times roll", a regional invitation to join in a festive celebration. A song with a similar theme, "Let the Good Times Roll", was recorded by Louis Jordan in 1946, that became a R&B chart hit.

== Composition and lyrics ==
In 1949, Garlow recorded "Bon Ton Roula", using a different arrangement and lyrics. The song was recorded as a sixteen-bar blues with "an insistent, swirling rhumba rhythm". Singer and music writer Billy Vera commented on the song's lyrics: "The song featured some of the same kind of broken Cajun-isms as Hank Williams's 'Jambalaya'":

Eh toi ...
You see me there, well I ain't no fool
I'm one smart Frenchman never been to school
Wanna get somewhere in a Creole town
You stop and let me show you your way 'round
You let the bon ton roula, you let the moolay boolay
Now don't you be no fool-ay, you let the bon ton roula

The song's success prompted Garlow to record subsequent renditions. A newer version with singer Emma Dell Lee titled "New Bon Ton Roola" was released on Feature Records and in 1953, he recorded a version with the Maxwell Davis Orchestra for Aladdin Records, titled "New Bon Ton Roulay". The song retains most of the elements of the original song, but some new lyrics are added and the arrangement does not include a progression to the IV chord.

== Legacy ==
"Bon Ton Roula" (with a variety of spellings) has been recorded by several artists often associated with Louisiana music, including Bo Dollis and the Wild Magnolias, Phillip Walker, and BeauSoleil. Blues-rocker Johnny Winter, a native of Garlow's adopted home of Beaumont, Texas, also recorded a version for his Raisin' Cain album in 1980.

A "Bon Ton Roulet" credited to Clifton Chenier was recorded in 1967 and released as the title track of his album Bon Ton Roulet, on Arhoolie Records. Producer Chris Strachwitz notes "You will perhaps recognize the song as 'Let the Good Times Roll', which in recent years has become an R&B standard".
