= Aloud 'n' Live =

Aloud 'N' Live

Studio album by Hush
- Released: December 1973
- Recorded: United Sound Studios, Sydney
- Genre: Glam rock; hard rock
- Label: Warner Bros. Records
- Producer: Chris Nolan

Hush chronology
Aloud 'N' Live (1973)	Get Rocked! (1974)

Singles from Aloud 'n' Live
- 1. "Get the Feeling" Released: October 1973

Aloud 'n' Live is the debut studio album by Australian rock group Hush. The album peaked at No. 40 on the Australian charts.

== Reception ==
Ian Cross of The Canberra Times observed that their "sound is simple, hard rock and roll, yet it has a sense of originality about it. A great deal of its appeal is generated by the wild stage act. Dressed in colorful costumes the members dance around the stage involving themselves and, their audience."

== Track listing ==
Side A
No.	Title	Writer(s)	Length
1.	"Take Us Home"	Hush
2.	"Three Blind Mice"	Hush
3.	"Make Luv to You"	Willie Dixon
4.	"Honky Tonk Women"	Jagger/Richards
5.	"Come on Up"	Felix Cavaliere
6.	"Summertime Blues"	Eddie Cochran
7.	"Greenskin Girl From Mars"	Hush

Side B
No.	Title	Writer(s)	Length
1.	"Come On Everybody"	Steve Marriott
2.	"Get the Feeling"	Hush
3.	"Morning Dew"	Bonnie Dobson, Tim Rose
4.	"Johnny B. Goode"	Chuck Berry
5.	"Long Tall Sally"	Enotris Johnson, Robert Blackwell, Richard Penniman
6.	"Black Skin Blue Eyed Boys"	Eddy Grant

== Charts ==
Chart (1973)	Peak position
Australian Albums (Kent Music Report)	40
