= In Parts Assembled Solely =

EP of remixes by Spahn Ranch
- Released: May 21, 1996
- Recorded: September 30, 1995
- Studio: Sinamatic (Los Angeles, California)
- Genre: Industrial rock
- Length: 49:31
- Label: Cleopatra

Spahn Ranch chronology
The Coiled One (1995)	In Parts Assembled Solely (1996)	Architecture (1997)

In Parts Assembled Solely is the fourth EP by Spahn Ranch, released on May 21, 1996, by Cleopatra Records. It comprises six remixes and four live versions of tracks from the band's 1995 album The Coiled One.

== Reception ==
In his review of In Parts Assembled Solely, Jon Worley of Aiding & Abetting noted that "the only remix that outdoes the original is the first track" and "the live tracks prove that Spahn Ranch can play live, I guess, but they are completely redundant." CMJ New Music Monthly listed the EP as the top "Family Album", which offers a list of releases to listen to with one's relatives. Sonic Boom pointed to the live tracks as being the highlight of the album, saying "the sound quality isn't all that great, yet the live tracks have a raw emotional context to them which they lack in the studio versions."

== Track listing ==
All lyrics are written by Athan Maroulis.

No.	Title	Music	Remixer(s)	Length
1.	"Heretic's Fork" (Belief Mix)	Matt Green; Athan Maroulis; Rob Morton	Birmingham 6	5:59
2.	"Vortex" (Blackened Mix)	Green; Maroulis	Überzone	5:24
3.	"Compression Test" (Interruption Mix)	Green; Maroulis	Überzone	5:27
4.	"Heretic's Fork" (Inquisition Mix)	Green; Maroulis; Morton	Überzone	5:53
5.	"Locusts" (Plague Mix)	Green; Maroulis	Judson Leach	3:57
6.	"Heretic's Fork" (Belief Instrumental)	Green; Maroulis; Morton	Birmingham 6	6:00
7.	"The Judas Cradle" (Live)	Green; Maroulis		4:03
8.	"Vortex" (Live)	Green; Maroulis		4:31
9.	"Compression Test" (Live)	Green; Maroulis		4:37
10.	"Locusts" (Live)	Green; Maroulis		3:40

== Accolades ==
Year	Publication	Country	Accolade	Rank
1996	CMJ New Music Monthly	United States	"Top 25 Dance"	13
"*" denotes an unordered list.

== Personnel ==
Adapted from the In Parts Assembled Solely liner notes.

Spahn Ranch

- Athan Maroulis – lead vocals
- Matt Green – sampler, keyboards
- Harry Lewis – percussion

Additional performers

- Kent Bancroft – live guitar
- Michael Hillerup – remix (1, 6)
- David Parkinson (as David Glass) – percussion
- Kim Løhde Petersen – remix (1, 6)
- Timothy Wiles (as Überzone) – remix (2–4)

Production and design

- Judson Leach – engineering, mixing, remix (5)

== Release history ==
Region	Date	Label	Format	Catalog
United States	1996	Cleopatra	CD	CLP 97402
