= Cow Island, Louisiana =

Unincorporated community in Louisiana, U.S.

Coordinates: 29°54′00″N 92°15′43″W

Cow Island is an unincorporated community in Vermilion Parish, Louisiana, United States.

Cow Island was the subject of controversy over suspected arsenic releases from cattle dip tanks; residents of the city sued a pharmaceutical company for US$5 million in cleanup costs for arsenic-contaminated water, but a later study suggested the arsenic may have been geologic in origin.

== Notable person ==
- Harry Choates
