= Macy's Recordings =

Record label

- Macy's Recordings "Queen of Hits"
- Founded: 1948 (or early 1949)
- Defunct: 1951
- Status: Defunct
- Genre: Cajun, country, swamp blues, swamp pop
- Country of origin: United States
- Location: Houston, Texas, United States

Macy's Recordings (Queen of Hits) was a Houston-based record label that released recordings of popular musicians around the southern United States. In April 1949, they famously recorded the Lester Williams song "Winter Time Blues" on their R&B series which became a hit. They would go on to record country and Cajun music as well.

== History ==
Steve Poncio, ca.1968

The record label was started by husband and wife, Charles D. Henry and Macy Lela Henry, who worked alongside supervisor Steve Poncio. Poncio worked as general manager for Macy's in 1946 and then founded United Record Distributing Company in 1949. Macy ran a department store based in Houston, Texas (unrelated to the famous New York department store) and in 1948, they began distributing records for other labels, such as Modern Music, including their back catalog material. and even had an office in Dallas. In 1949, they decided to create their own label to sell and distribute from their store. They created the Macy's Record Distribution Company and they used Bill Holford's ACA Studios in Houston to record the music. The place was known for its high quality sound.

Their first recordings released were with Jim Reeves. However, they would make their mark on blues music in 1949 by recording Lester Williams' song "Winter Time Blues" and then in 1950, they would sign and record Clarence Garlow, releasing a version of his song "Bon Ton Rolla". The company would hire other dealers to distribute their music in Nashville, Atlanta and New Orleans.

Bill Holford at ACA Studios, early 1960s

These artists would go on to record other songs for Macy. Macy's didn't fare well in the marketplace despite the quality of their music. They were competing against other Houston brands such as Duke-Peacock, D Records, Starday, Freedom, Sittin' In With and Gold Star. By June 1951, many of their signature artists moved to Modern Records and Aladdin Records ending the Macy's label production. The catalog is currently owned by Fivepin Music based in Toronto.

== Artists ==
- Jim Reeves, 1949
- Clarence Garlow, 1949
- Smokey Hogg, 1950
- Hubert Robinson, 1950
- Lester Williams, 1949
- Harry Choates,

== Discography ==
Macys 78s
Catalog	Artist	A Side	B Side
100	Woody Carter And His Hoedown Boys	Slippin Around	Sittin On The Doorstep
101	Woody Carter And His Hoedown Boys	Only You	Who's Gonna Chop My Baby's Firewood
102	Claudie Ham And His Radio Playboys	Moonlight Texas Waltz	I'll Wait A Lifetime For You
103	Barney Vardeman And His Drifting Texans	Let's Call It Quits	I Love Someone
104	Claudie Ham And His Radio Playboys	We'll Say Goodbye Tomorrow	That’s All I'm Through
105	Tommy Dover And His Texas Rhythm Boys	I Love You Because	I'll Keep My Memory Of You
106	Art Gunn And His Arizona Playboys	Cornbread Boogie	St Augustine Waltz
107	Dusty Payton	The Chains Of Love Are Broken	No Room In My Heart
108	Tommy Dover And His Texas Rhythm Boys	Weeping Willow	Blue Over You
109	Smitty Smith And His Lone Star Rangers	Broken Memories	A Heart Full Of Blues
110	Raley Bros And Woody Carter	Hoedown Breakdown	Medley Of German Waltzes
111	Barney Vardeman And His Driftin Texans	Till We Meet Again Darling	I'm Finding Me A New Heart
112	Bar X Cowboys	Cold Shadows In My Heart	Fair Weather Friend
113	Dickie Jones And His Rhythm Rangers	I Wish I Knew Do You	Never Again For Me
114	Clint Small The Singing Bus Driver	Three Years	Someone Cares
115	Jim Reeves	My Hearts Like A Welcome Mat	Teardrops Of Regret
116	Ramblin Tommy Scott	Tennessee	Rosebuds And You
117	Laverl Carrico And The Angelina Pals	She Tore Up My Picture	Too Many Women Too Much Beer
118	Sonny Hall And His Moonshiners	I'll Keep My Eyes On Your Heart	Just A Little Bit More
119	Ray Welch	Louisiana Blues	Cross My Heart
120	Smitty Smith And His Lone Star Rangers	If Teardrops Were Diamonds	You Sent My Heart To Prison
121	Tommy Dover	Only You Hold The Key	I'll Be Moving Along
122	Art Gunn And His Arizona Playboys	Boogie Woogie Blues	Last Tear
123	Curley Rash And His So Texas Playboys	Was It Just A Year Ago	The Battleship Texas
124	Harry (Jole Blon) Choates	Gra Mamou	Catn' Around
125	Cousin Bob Rogers	Driftin	Blue Yodel No 1
126	Biff Collie	I Want A Gal To Cook For Me	Ive Said It Before I'll Say It Again
127	Morris Mills And The Rithumakers	Id Like To Slip Around With You	Don’T Play This Record
128	Morris Mills And The Rithumakers	Calendar Girl	I Remember Do You
129	Bob Greene And His Filling Station Swing	Somebody Stole My Rag Mop	You Just Don’t Know
130	Ramblin Tommy Scott	Smoky Mountain Sunset	Aint What She Used To Be
131	Dolores And The Bluebonnet Boys	Dessau Schottische	One Woman Man
132	Jim Reeves	Chicken Hearted	Ive Never Been So Blue
133	Dub Poston And His Downtown Playboys	Cant You Believe	I Can't Use You Anymore
134	Harry Choates	Louisiana Boogie	What's The Use
135	Yodeling Bob Stotts	Out Along The Colorado Trail	I Guess I Learn A Lot Every Day
136	Bill Grady's Dixie Cowboys	Rambling Man	I'll Always Get Along
137	Ray Welch	You No Longer Carry My Name	No Use To Cry Over You
138	Sonny Hall	Ive Been Lost Without You	Texas Waltz
139	Paul Brown And His Bar X Cowboys	Where Texas Meets The Sea	Now You're Mine At Last
140	Laverl Carrico And The Angelina Pals	I Have Lost My Trust In You	My Life's Story
141	Harry Choates	Korea Here We Come	Do You Still Love Me
142	Morris Mills And The Rithumakers	Steppin On Feet For Fun	I Need Some Sunshine
143	Cousin Bob Rogers	Lonesome Freight Train Blues	Cloud Corral
144	Vance Bros	Draftboard Blues	Can't Get You Out Of My Dreams
145	Curley Rash And His South Texas Playboys	Humble Road Boogie	Have I Held You In My Arms Like This Before
146	Art Gunn And His Arizona Playboys	Barn Dance Boogie	Sleepy Time Out West
147	Harry Choates	Ive Quit My Cattin Around	Fiddle Polka
148	Ramblin Tommy Scott	When A Man Gets The Blues	Been Gone A Long Time
149	Clint Small With The Corral Wranglers	Texas Rag	Learn To Be Blue
150	Dolores And The Bluebonnet Boys	I Don’t Care	A Broken Heart
151	Morris Mills And The Rithumakers	Oh Baby Do	I Try So Hard
152	Cousin Bob Rodgers	Secret Love	Trail In The Sun
153	Vance Bros	Ill Always Call You Darling	You're Just An Angel
155	Tommy Dover And His Texas Rhythm Boys	I Can't Get You Out Of My Heart	Brakeman's Blues
156	Dolores And The Bluebonnet Boys	Fiesta Waltz	Pickin
157	Dean Smith	Sweetheart Hill	Sunset Valley
158	Harry Choates	Harry's Blues	She's Sweet Sweet
159	Harry Choates	My Pretty Brunette	Corpus Christe Waltz
1000	Buddy Ryland and Orchestra	Wild Cherry	I Ain't Mad At You
1001	Macy And Her Ole Time Bar Band	Shine On Harvest Moon	Dill Pickle Rag
1002	Macy And Her Ole Time Bar Band	Boogie Woogie Piano	Who's Sorry Now
5000	Lester Williams	I'm So Happy I Could Jump And Shout	Wintertime Blues
5001	Clarence Garlow	She's So Fine	Blues As You Like It
5002	Clarence Garlow	Bon Ton Roula	In A Boogie Mood
5003	Smoky Hogg	You Gotta Go	Leaving You Baby
5004	Lester Williams	All I Need Is You	I Know That Chick
5005	Hubert Robinson	Where Were You Pretty Baby	Boogie The Joint
5006	Lester Williams	Dowling Street Hop	Don't Treat Me So Low Down
5007	Hubert Robinson	Answer To Wintertime Blues	Old Woman Boogie
5008	Smoky Hogg	Baby Baby	Change Your Ways
5009	Lester Williams	Mary Lou	Texas Town
5010	Hubert Robinson	Room And Board Boogie	Bad Luck And Trouble
5011	Cab Mcmillan And His Fade Aways	I'm Young And Able	Three Woman Blues
5012	Clarence Garlow	Bound To Lose My Mind	Jumpin' For Joy
5013	Wilson-Watson Singers	Old Ship of Zion	Throw Out The Life Line
5014	Joe Houston	Cornbread And Cabbage Greens	Pretty Dad-Dee
5015	Hubert Robinson	I Love You Baby	High Class Woman
5016	Lester Williams	Hey Jack	The Folks Around The Corner

=== Compilations ===
- Cat N Around (#875512 KrazyKat/Interstate, 1997)
- Texas Hillbilly: The Best of Macy's Hillbilly Recordings (ACRCD125 Acrobat, 2006)
- Queen Of Hits: The Macy's Recordings Story (ACRCD228 Acrobat, 2011)
