= Hush (band) =

1970s Australian rock band

- Origin: Sydney, Australia
- Genres: Glam rock; hard rock
- Years active: 1971–1977, 2004, 2006
- Labels: Philips; WEA; Vertigo; Escape; PVK; Wizard
- Past members: Keith Lamb; Rick Lum; Robin Jackson; Johnny Koutts; Chris Nolan; Les Gock; Chris Pailthorpe; Jacques de Jongh (deceased)
- Website: hushmusic.com.au

Hush was an Australian glam rock band that formed in 1971 and disbanded in 1977.

For most of that time, their line-up was lead singer Keith Lamb with Les Gock on lead guitar, Rick Lum on bass guitar and Chris 'Smiley' Pailthorpe on drums. They had top 10 hits on the Kent Music Report with their cover versions of "Bony Moronie" and "Glad All Over" (both 1975). The group frequently appeared on the TV pop music show Countdown and toured nationally.

== History ==
=== Australian success: 1971–1977 ===
Hush were formed in Seven Hills, New South Wales in 1971 as a five-piece light pop group by Keith Lamb on lead vocals, Robin Jackson on guitar, John Koutts on drums, Rick Lum on bass guitar and Chris Nolan on keyboards. Lamb and Jackson had migrated to Australia from England at the same time. Nolan had previously been with Grandmars Observers.

Hush released their debut single, "Over You", late that year via the Philips Records label. In April of the following year Les Gock (ex-Chariot) on lead guitar and Chris "Smiley" Pailthorpe on drums joined Lamb and Lum in the Hush four-piece line-up. They reached the state finals of national band competition, Hoadley's Battle of the Sounds, and issued a cover version of "White Christmas" as a single in December. Australian musicologist, Ian McFarlane, felt that "Gock gave the band a tougher sound in the guitar department." During 1973 they supported concerts by the Jackson Five and by Status Quo.

Hush first made the Kent Music Report singles chart in October 1973, with their own composition, "Get the Feeling", which reached No. 40. They followed with their debut album, Aloud 'n' Live, on WEA, reached No. 40 on the Kent Music Report albums chart. In February 1974, the band released "Man Eater", which peaked at number 88.

Their second album, Get Rocked!, was issued in July 1974 on Wizard Records and peaked at No. 9 The Canberra Times' Garry Raffaele declared, "May the saints preserve us from such musical sludge." The title track provided Lamb with a memorable moment, he recalled in August 2004 that they were due to perform in Manjimup, Western Australia, "The mayor had heard we got the crowd to sing 'get fucked' during our song 'Get Rocked' ... which is something the crowd always did off its own bat. The police said the mayor didn't want us interfering with the local girls." The group's highest charting original single, "Walking" (August 1974), was co-written by Gock and Lamb, which peaked at No. 22. They released their third album, C'mon We're Taking Over in November 1974, which reached No. 26.

In 1975, Hush made an appearance on pop music TV show, Countdown, performing a rocked up, driving cover version of Larry Williams's "Bony Moronie". The song made No. 4 on the singles chart in September 1975, riding the wave of the glam-rock craze in Australia. The band's fourth studio album, Rough Tough 'n' Ready was released in November 1975 and peaked at No. 15.

McFarlane felt that "One of the defining moments of Australia's 1970s pop legacy was undoubtably [sic] Hush performing "Boney Moroney"." He described how "Lamb wiggled his satin flares-encased bum, thrust out his crotch and leered at the camera with a mischievous look in his eyes (and all the little girls understood). [Gock] dashed around the set in stack-heeled boots and glam threads, with peroxided streaks in his flowing, jet-black hair. [Lum] hammed it up in a serious kind of way. [Pailthorpe] cheerfully revealed his goofy, gap-toothed grin whenever the camera panned across his face." Their next cover version, "Glad All Over" (late 1975), which peaked at No. 8, was originally released by the Dave Clark Five.

In August 1976, they added a second guitarist, Jacques de Jongh (ex-Shadowfax, Redhouse); Rick Lum left three months later and De Jongh moved over to bass guitar. They supported Alice Cooper on his tour of Australia during March 1977. The group released an album, Touché, in July of that year. McFarlane noticed they "tried to make a serious affirmation of [their] abilities" where the album "featured a rock side, A Touch of Decadence, and a slow side, A Touch of Class." Pailthorpe left the group at the end of 1977 with Gock following soon after.

=== Post break-up: 1977–present ===
After the band broke up in 1977, Lamb with De Jongh formed New Hush, a.k.a. Hush 2. De Jongh left in April 1978 to join John Paul Young and the All Stars. Lamb continued New Hush with Criston Barker on bass guitar (ex-Ash, Freeway, Hollywood), Con Gallin on guitar (ex-Fingerprint), Paul Grant on guitar (ex-Buster Brown, Hollywood) and Nat De Palma on drums (ex-20th Century). Lamb formed other bands including Keith Lamb Band, Larry and Airport. He was later a partner in an international embroidery company, Rajmahal, and co-author of a card game series, TAOC: The Art of Conversation. Lamb co-wrote songs for Status Quo, including the top 10 hit, "Ol' Rag Blues" (September 1983).

According to McFarlane "in the lucrative world of advertising, [Gock] has established himself as one of the country's foremost music and sound designers. He has also produced the soundtracks for the film Puberty Blues and the television drama series Water Rats." Pailthorpe became an architect. De Jongh continued his music career and recorded material; he was also a chef. Lum worked in graphic design.

In November 1979, Lamb reformed Hush for a one-off gig, Concert of the Decade, at the forecourt of the Sydney Opera House. Hush reunited in August 2004 for a Nordoff-Robbins charity event. The line-up of Lamb, Gock, Lum and Pailthorpe performed together for the first time in 25 years. Gock's son Adam joined them on stage. In September 2006 Hush toured Australia with other artists on the Countdown Spectacular Tour. Another original member, guitarist Robin Jackson, then-playing with Chris Turner & the Wolftones, re-joined Hush for that tour. After leaving Hush in 1972 Jackson had "dropped out of music for a bit. But late '76 I got the bug again and joined the '60s oriented group Punkz." Punkz changed their name to Cheek in mid-1977 to avoid association with punk music; they had a top 50 hit with "So Much in Love" (January 1978). Rhythm and bass guitarist Jacques de Jongh died on 23 February 2025.

== Members ==
- Keith Lamb – lead vocals (1971–77, 1979, 2004, 2006)
- Robin Jackson – lead guitar (1971–72, 2006)
- John Koutts – drums (1971–72)
- Rick Lum – bass guitar (1971–76, 2004, 2006)
- Chris Nolan – keyboards (1971–72)
- Les Gock – lead guitar (1972–77, 2004, 2006)
- Chris Pailthorpe – drums (1972–77, 2004, 2006)
- Jacques de Jongh – rhythm guitar, bass guitar (1976–77; died 2025)

== Discography ==
=== Studio albums ===
List of albums, with selected chart positions and certifications
Title	Album details	Peak chart positions
Title	Album details	AUS
Aloud 'n' Live	Released: December 1973; Label: Warner Brothers Music (WS 20014)	40
Get Rocked!	Released: June 1974; Label: Wizard Records (ZL 206)	9
C'mon We're Taking Over	Released: December 1974; Label: Wizard Records (ZL 210)	26
Rough Tough 'n' Ready	Released: November 1975; Label: Wizard Records (ZL 211)	15
Touché	Released: July 1977; Label: Wizard Records (ZL 221)	36

=== Compilation albums ===
List of compilation albums, with selected chart positions and certifications
Title	Album details	Peak chart positions
Title	Album details	AUS
Nothing Stays the Same Forever (The Best of Hush Volume One)	Released: November 1976; Label: Wizard Records (ZL 213)	57
The Best Of Hush	Released: 1996; Label: Castle Communications / BMG Records (PCD 10211)	-

=== EPs ===
Title	EP details
Hush Power	Released: 1974; Label: Warner Brothers Music (EPW-263); 4-track compilation.
Get Hushed!	Released: 1975; Label: Wizard Records (ZEP-001); 4-track compilation.

=== Singles ===
Year	Single	Album	Peak chart position
Year	Single	Album	AUS
1971	"Over You"	non-album single	–
1972	"White Christmas"	non-album single	–
1973	"Get the Feeling"	Aloud 'n' Live	40
1974	"Man Eater"	Hush Power	88
1974	"Walking"	Get Rocked!	22
1974	"C’Mon We’re Taking Over"	C’Mon We’re Taking Over	–
1975	"Bony Moronie"	Rough Tough 'N' Ready	4
1975	"Glad All Over"	Rough Tough 'N' Ready	8
1976	"Rough, Tough & Ready"/"You Really Gotta Hold on Me" (Note: "Rough, Tough & Ready" and "You Really Gotta Hold on Me" was released as a double-A sided single)	Rough Tough 'N' Ready	49
1976	"Too Young to Know"/"Lies" (Note: "Too Young to Know" and "Lies" was released as a double-A sided single)	Nothing Stays the Same Forever	33
1976	"Sunday"	Nothing Stays the Same Forever	80
1977	"Nothing Stays the Same Forever"	Touché	52
1977	"Messin' Around"	Touché	91
