= The Coiled One =

Studio album by Spahn Ranch
- Released: September 12, 1995
- Recorded: November 1994 – March 1993
- Studio: JLab Studio (Los Angeles, California)
- Genre: Electro-industrial; industrial rock; EBM
- Length: 42:44
- Label: Cleopatra
- Producer: Matt Green; Judson Leach; Rob Morton

Spahn Ranch chronology
| Breath and Taxes (1994) | The Coiled One (1995) | In Parts Assembled Solely (1996) |

Alternative cover
- Repress cover

The Coiled One is the second studio album by American electro-industrial group Spahn Ranch, released on September 12, 1995 by Cleopatra Records. Founding member and chief composer Rob Morton departed from the band soon after recording sessions for the album had finished. The album's main musical theme is about religion. The Coiled One was released on Bandcamp as a music download in 2011.

== Reception ==
Professional ratings
Review scores
| Source | Rating |
|---|---|
| Allmusic | 3/5 stars |

Jon Worley of Aiding & Abetting called The Coiled One and said "the sound is much fuller and the beats omnipresent" In his review for Allmusic, John Bush awarded The Coiled One three out of five stars and said "Electronic industrialists Spahn Ranch unmask the previously distorted vocals but continue their dance grooves." Sonic Boom said the band "has taken the road paved by many industrial related artists lately and moved their music towards a more accessible audience without compromising one little bit on the sound quality or musical value."

Critic Dave Thompson gave the album a mixed review, saying "tossing away much of their old sound (including the heavily processed vocals) for a sharp teclmo-industrial hybrid, the straight crossovers lack innovation." Black Monday was also somewhat critical in their review and described the music as "nothing mediocre, mind you, just quality sameness or likeness, with a tinge of excitement burgeoning at the seems."

== Track listing ==
| No. | Title | Writer(s) | Length |
|---|---|---|---|
| 1. | "Locusts" | Athan Maroulis; Matt Green | 3:58 |
| 2. | "Heretic's Fork" | Maroulis; Green; Rob Morton | 4:42 |
| 3. | "Vortex" | Maroulis; Morton | 4:06 |
| 4. | "Infrastructure" | Maroulis; Green; Morton | 4:32 |
| 5. | "Compression Test" | Maroulis; Green | 4:18 |
| 6. | "Threnody" | Maroulis; Green; Morton | 3:49 |
| 7. | "The Judas Cradle" | Maroulis; Green | 3:56 |
| 8. | "Syndrome Exhibit" | Maroulis; Green; Morton | 4:06 |
| 9. | "Babel" | Maroulis; Green | 4:45 |
| 10. | "Static Detonates the Gel" | Green | 3:33 |
| 11. | "Untitled" | | 0:58 |

== Personnel ==
Adapted from the liner notes of The Coiled One.

Spahn Ranch

- Matt Green – sampler, synthesizer, programming, production and mixing (1, 2, 3, 5, 7, 10), additional production (4, 8)
- Athan Maroulis – lead vocals, art direction
- Rob Morton – programming, sampler, synthesizer, production (4–6, 8, 9), mixing (4, 5)

Production and design

- Nicole Hagedorn (as Nikki Vonhagedorn) – design
- Judson Leach – recording, mixing, production, additional programming

== Release history ==
| Region | Date | Label | Format | Catalog |
|---|---|---|---|---|
| United States | 1995 | Cleopatra | CD | CLEO 9645 |
