= Spahn Ranch (EP) =

EP by Spahn Ranch
- Released: October 16, 1992
- Recorded: 1992
- Studio: The Backroom (Los Angeles, California).
- Genre: Industrial rock
- Length: 14:26
- Label: Cleopatra
- Producer: Rob Morton; Rod O'Brien

Spahn Ranch chronology
Spahn Ranch (1992)	Collateral Damage (1993)

Spahn Ranch is the eponymously titled debut EP by Spahn Ranch. It was released on October 16, 1992, by Cleopatra Records. The album was mostly a vehicle for founding member Matt Green and Rob Morton, who had been composing together for nearly five years before being signed to Cleopatra.

== Track listing ==
All lyrics are written by Scott Franklin; all music is composed by Matt Green and Rob Morton.

No.	Title	Length
1.	"Layin to Burn"	2:41
2.	"Mind Riot"	4:26
3.	"See My Knife"	3:28
4.	"P.O.W."	3:51

== Personnel ==
Adapted from the Spahn Ranch liner notes.

Spahn Ranch

- Scott Franklin (as Chopper Franklin) – lead vocals
- Matt Green – guitar, bass guitar
- Rob Morton – sampler, programming, production

Production and design

- Rod O'Brien – production, engineering, mixing
- Christopher Payne – cover art, illustrations, design

== Release history ==
Region	Date	Label	Format	Catalog
United States	1992	Cleopatra	CD	CLEO 59432
