= Get Rocked! =

Studio album by Hush
- Released: June 1974
- Recorded: Armstrong Studios, Melbourne
- Genre: Hard rock; glam rock
- Label: Wizard Records
- Producer: Ernie Rose

Hush chronology
Aloud 'n' Live (1973)	Get Rocked! (1974)	C'mon We're Taking Over (1974)

Singles from Get Rocked!
- 1. "Walking" Released: June 1974

Get Rocked! is the second studio album by Australian rock group Hush. The album was aired in June 1974 peaked at No. 9 and was certified triple gold on the Australian charts.

== Track listing ==
Side A (ZL 206)
No.	Title	Writer(s)	Length
1.	"Get Rocked / Satisfaction"	Hush / Jagger/Richards
2.	"Walking"	Hush
3.	"Raven the Dark"	Hush
4.	"Francis Rainbow"	Hush
5.	"The Exit"	Hush

Side B
No.	Title	Writer(s)	Length
1.	"Nunchunka Man"	Hush
2.	"Riff in My Head"	Hush
3.	"Mindrocker"	Hush
4.	"Rockin' the Boat"	Hush
5.	"South Coast Standards"	Hush

== Charts ==
Chart (1974)	Peak position
Australian Albums (Kent Music Report)	9
