= Harry Choates =

American musician

Background information
- Born: December 26, 1922
- Origin: Cow Island, Louisiana, U.S.
- Died: July 17, 1951 (aged 28)
- Genres: Cajun
- Occupations: Musician, Fiddler
- Instrument: Fiddle
- Years active: 1934-51
- Labels: Gold Star, Modern Music, Starday, D Records, Deluxe, Macy's, O.T., Allied, Cajun Classics, Humming Bird
- Formerly of: The Melody Boys

Harry Henry Choates (December 26, 1922 – July 17, 1951) was an American Cajun music fiddler known as the "Fiddle King of Cajun Swing" and the "Godfather of Cajun music." The scholar Barry Jean Ancelet called Choates "undoubtedly the most popular Cajun musician of his day."

== Early years ==
Much of Choates' early life is disputed. Most sources list his birthplace as the southern Louisiana town of Rayne. But his State of Texas death certificate lists his birthplace as New Iberia, his World War II draft card says Abbeville, and his baptismal certificate lists his place of birth as Cow Island, Louisiana, a small community located south of the town of Kaplan. Choates' baptismal certificate lists his parents as Clarence Choate and Idolie Menard. He was born Harry Henry Choate, and added an "s" to his last name at some point after his first marriage.

The Choates had moved to Port Arthur, Texas, by 1930, part of a large migration of Cajuns to the Beaumont–Port Arthur metropolitan area, seeking jobs in the oil patch. Harry received little schooling, instead spending time in local bars listening to music on jukeboxes. By age 12, he was playing fiddle for spare change in barbershops.

== Career ==
Choates gained early professional experience playing in the bands of Leo Soileau and Leroy Leblanc, then split off to form his own group, called the Melody Boys, in 1946. His 1946 song "Jole Blon," a top 10 hit (Billboard position #4) for Choates, was recorded by Quinn Recording under the Gold Star Records label (#1314). Since Gold Star could not keep up with the demand for "Jole Blon", the record was co-released under other labels, such as Modern Music (#20-511), Deluxe (#6000), Starday (#187), and D Records (#1024). Later, it was recorded by country singer Moon Mullican (King #578) and became a major hit, but Choates had waived his rights to the song and was never compensated for its success.

Choates remained with the Melody Boys from 1946 to 1951, recording for Gold Star Records in 1946-47 and later for Macy's Recordings. The Melody Boys disbanded over Choates' chronic problems with alcoholism and his frequent missed concert dates, and shortly after the dissolution he played with Jesse James & His Gang on KTBC radio.

== Death ==
In the middle of 1951, Choates was found to be in contempt of court for failing to pay his support payments for his children. He spent three days in the Travis County Jail, at which time he began hitting his head against the bars of his jail cell, eventually knocking himself into a coma. The condition persisted for several days before Choates died of the effects of his alcoholism on July 17, 1951.

== Legacy ==
Choates is known as the "Parrain de la musique cajun" ("Godfather of Cajun music") mainly because of his introduction of vocal wailing throughout his music. In 2014, Rolling Stone magazine ranked Harry Choates' version of "Jole Blon" number 99 in its list of the 100 greatest country songs.

External audio
- "Jole Blon" (1946 Recording)
- "Jole Blon"

== Discography ==
=== Compilations ===
- Jole Blon (D Records DLP-7000, 1979)
- Fiddle King of Cajun Swing (Arhoolie 5027, 1982)
- Five-Time Loser (Krazy Kat KK-7453, 1986)
- Fiddle King of Cajun Swing (Arhoolie CD-380, 1993) CD reissue
- Five-Time Loser (Krazy Kat KK CD-22, 1998) CD reissue
- Jole Blon: The Original Cajun Fiddle of Harry Choates (Glad CD-7000, 1999)
- Harry Choates – Cajun Fiddle King (AIM CD-1205, 1999)
- Devil in the Bayou (The Gold Star Recordings) (Bear Family BCD-16355, 2002)

== See also ==
- History of Cajun Music
- List of Notable People Related to Cajun Music
