= Gold Star Records =

American independent record label

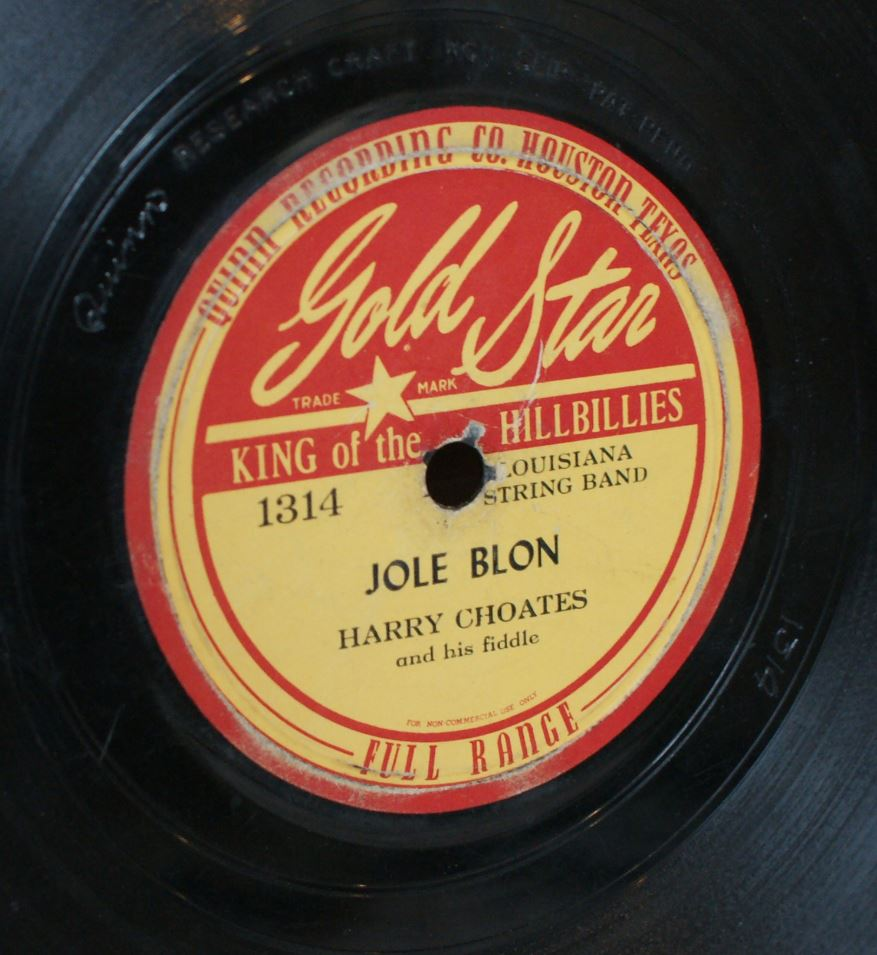
- "Jole Blon"
- Parent company: Quinn Recording Company
- Founded: 1941
- Genre: Cajun, country, blues, rock, R&B, hip hop
- Country of origin: United States
- Location: Houston, Texas, United States

Gold Star Records is an American independent record label founded by Bill Quinn in Houston, Texas in 1941.

== History ==
In 1939 Bill Quinn settled in Houston and established the Quinn Radio Service, a radio repair shop. After being intrigued by a home disc recorder he was asked to repair, he purchased one and began to experiment with it. In 1941 he opened a shop at 3104 Telephone Road in Houston, Texas, where he recorded personalized voice messages. Quinn renamed the business Quinn Recording Company and soon began recording radio jingles. Venturing into music production in 1944, he founded the short-lived Gulf Record Company label.

In 1946, Quinn founded Gold Star Records, initially recording local country (or "hillbilly") artists before expanding to record local blues and Cajun artists. In 1947, Gold Star had its first hit record, "Jole Blon" by Harry Choates, a swing and dance tune that and became the first and only Cajun record to reach the Billboard Top Five. In 1948, Lightnin' Hopkins' songs "T-Model Blues" and "Tim Moore's Farm", both became top 10 national hits, and Hopkins would record over 100 songs with Gold Star. Quinn also signed Lil' Son Jackson to the Gold Star Label, releasing "Freedom Train Blues" in 1948, which became a nationwide hit for Jackson. Quinn would also release several Cajun songs on his Opera label.

In 1950, Quinn moved the studio into the first floor of his family home at 5628 Brock Street, just a few blocks from the original studio. He changed the name of the studio to Gold Star Studios. Around this time, the U.S. Government fined Gold Star Records $26,000 for unpaid excise taxes related to the sale of phonograph records on the Gold Star label that Quinn mistakenly thought were being paid by the pressing plants, but weren't. After costly legal negotiations, the sum total was reduced to $250, but Quinn ceased Gold Star Records operations. Quinn sold or leased his catalogue of Gold Star master recordings to other labels and utilized Gold Star Studios to record for other labels.
