= C'mon We're Taking Over =

Studio album by Hush
- Released: November 1974
- Recorded: Armstrong Studios, Melbourne
- Genre: Glam rock
- Label: Wizard Records
- Producer: Ernie Rose

Hush chronology
Get Rocked! (1974)	C'mon We're Taking Over (1974)	Rough Tough 'n' Ready (1975)

Singles from C'mon We're Taking Over
- 1. "C'mon We're Taking Over" Released: November 1974

C'mon We're Taking Over is the third studio album by Australian rock group Hush. Released in November 1974, the album peaked at No. 26 and was certified double gold on the Australian charts.

== Track listing ==
Side A (ZL 210)
No.	Title	Writer(s)	Length
1.	"C'mon We're Taking Over"	Hush
2.	"Rocking Gypsy King"	Hush
3.	"Caroline"	Hush
4.	"In My Short Life"	Hush

Side B
No.	Title	Writer(s)	Length
1.	"Born in the Age of Rock 'n' Roll"	Hush
2.	"They're Having a Party"	Hush
3.	"Temperatures Rising"	Hush
4.	"Longing to Get Home"	Hush

== Charts ==
Chart (1974–1975)	Peak position
Australian Albums (Kent Music Report)	26
