= Breath and Taxes (EP) =

EP of remixes by Spahn Ranch
- Released: 1994
- Studio: JLab Studio (Los Angeles, California)
- Genre: Electro-industrial
- Length: 30:32
- Label: Zoth Ommog

Spahn Ranch chronology
The Blackmail Starters Kit (1994)	Breath and Taxes (1994)	The Coiled One (1995)

Breath and Taxes is the third EP by Spahn Ranch, released in 1994 by Zoth Ommog Records. The song "Breath and Taxes" contains the lyrics "Charles, Charles in a jar" in direct reference to Charles Manson.

== Track listing ==
All lyrics are written by Athan Maroulis.

No.	Title	Music	Remixer(s)	Length
1.	"Breath and Taxes" (Deductible Mix)	Matt Green; Athan Maroulis	Judson Leach	4:02
2.	"CON"	Green; Maroulis; Rob Morton	Matt Green	3:49
3.	"Antibody" (Conspiracy Mix)	Green; Maroulis; Morton	Judson Leach	3:29
4.	"Succumber" (Blacklist Mix)	Green; Maroulis; Morton	Judson Leach	4:58
5.	"Forceps" (Sterilized Mix)	Maroulis; Morton	Judson Leach	3:59
6.	"Commination" (Demo 1991)	Morton		4:26
7.	"Kenneth, What's the Frequency?"	Maroulis; Morton		5:36
8.	"Untitled"			0:13

== Personnel ==
Adapted from the Breath and Taxes liner notes.

Spahn Ranch

- Matt Green – sampler, keyboards, sequencing, mixing (4)
- Athan Maroulis – lead vocals
- Rob Morton – programming, sampler, mixing (4)

Production and design

- Hype Graphics – design
- Judson Leach – recording, remix (1, 5), mixing (4), remixer (1, 3–5)

== Release history ==
Region	Date	Label	Format	Catalog
Germany	1994	Zoth Ommog	CD	ZOT 116
