= Short Fat Fannie =

- 1973 Dutch re-release

Single by Larry Williams
- B-side: "High School Dance"
- Released: 1957
- Genre: Rock and roll
- Length: 2:25
- Label: Specialty 608 (U.S.); London HLN 8472 (UK)
- Songwriter: Larry Williams

Larry Williams singles chronology
"High School Dance" (1957)	"Short Fat Fannie" (1957)	"Bony Moronie" (1958)

"Short Fat Fannie" (alternatively "Short Fat Fanny") is Larry Williams' second single release after "High School Dance". Williams' original penned track peaked at number five on the U.S. pop chart, and at number one on the R&B chart. It sold over one million records, Williams' first million seller.

== Recording ==
The track was recorded on April 26, 1957. The musicians included:

- Robert "Bumps" Blackwell, leader
- Jesse James Jones, tenor sax
- Leon M. Silby, piano
- René Hall, guitar
- Ted Brinson, bass
- Earl Palmer, drums

== Cover versions ==
The song was rehearsed by The Beatles during the filming of the documentary, Let It Be in 1969. The song was recorded on the film soundtrack and is featured on many bootleg recordings.

The song was also covered by Billy Preston, The Beatles, Little Richard, Frankie Lymon & The Teenagers, Curtis Johnson, Ronnie Self, The Dovells and Johnny Winter. Frankie Avalon also recorded the song.

The track was also a favorite of Levon Helm, drummer of The Band. He would sing the song often while touring as the Hawks, and played a version of it on Late Night with Conan O'Brien in 1993.

== Charts ==
- Billboard R&B: No. 1
- Billboard Hot 100: No. 5
- Billboard Hot 100 – B-side: No. 45
- Canada CHUM Chart; No. 3
- UK Singles Chart: No. 21
