= Black Skin Blue Eyed Boys =

Single by the Equals
- B-side: "Ain't Got Nothing to Give You"
- Released: 6 November 1970
- Genre: Funk; funk rock
- Length: 2:50
- Label: President PT 325
- Songwriter: Eddy Grant
- Producer: Eddy Grant

"Black Skin Blue Eyed Boys" is a song written by Guyanese-British musician Eddy Grant and recorded in London in 1970 by his band the Equals. Their recording, produced by Grant, reached number 9 on the UK Singles Chart on 30 January 1971 and was the band's last chart hit. It was released on Bang Records in the US but did not chart there.

== Background ==
The Equals were noted for being one of the first ethnically mixed bands in the UK. The song was described by journalist Chris Taylor as "a hymn to diversity" which "explicitly linked its racial theme with the anti-Vietnam war sentiment of the time". The song is also notable for heralding a shift in the band's sound, from the Caribbean-influenced pop-rock which had given them their initial success in the late 1960s to an embrace of funk music. Lloyd Bradley has described the song as "the first recognisably black British statement - a song that saw itself as being (British) in both words and music, and announced that London's indigenous black soul music was entirely self-sufficient".

== Reception ==
New Musical Express reviewed it on release, calling it "a song with a double moral in that it pleads for racial tolerance, whilst at the same time condemning war." In America, Billboard wrote, "Currently spiraling the British chart, this potent swinger with a wild vocal workout will hit here with sales impact as well." in a prediction that it would hit the top 60 of the Hot 100. It was also predicted to reach the top 20 in the Top Selling Soul Singles chart. Cashbox also favored the song, saying, "Super instrumental work and a driving new message lyric give the group enough power to surge into blues and top forty charts while gathering some FM momentum as well." Ironically, despite favorable reviews, the song failed to chart in America at all.

== Covers ==
In 2019, "Black Skin Blue Eyed Boys" was covered by the Specials as the opening track on their album Encore. Lynval Golding of the Specials said: "I've always thought of The Equals as our spiritual ancestors: they were a massive inspiration to all of us, genuine heroes.... Doing their song on the album is a tribute, our way of thanking them for everything they've done and how much they meant to us...".

The song was also covered by Australian band Hush, and released as a single in 1973. The single was taken from Hush's album Aloud 'n' Live.

== Personnel ==
- Derv Gordon – lead vocals
- Eddy Grant – lead guitar, backing vocals
- Pat Lloyd – rhythm guitar, backing vocals
- Lincoln Gordon – rhythm guitar, bass, backing vocals
- John Hall – drums
