= Bony Moronie =

1957 single by Larry Williams

- 1973 French re-release

Single by Larry Williams
- B-side: "You Bug Me Baby"
- Released: 1957
- Genre: Rock and roll
- Length: 2:57
- Label: Specialty 615 (U.S.); London HLU 8532 (UK)
- Songwriter: Larry Williams

Larry Williams singles chronology
"Short Fat Fannie" (1957)	"Bony Moronie" (1957)	"Dizzy, Miss Lizzy" (1958)

"Bony Moronie" was the third single by Larry Williams, released in 1957.

Williams' original peaked at No. 14 on the Billboard Best Sellers in Stores chart and No. 4 on the U.S. R&B chart. Since then the song has been covered many times.

== Chart performance ==
- #4 (U.S. Billboard R&B)
- #14 (U.S. Billboard Best Sellers in Stores)
- #45 (B-side (Billboard Hot 100))
- #14 Canada (CHUM Chart)
- #21 (b-side) Canada (CHUM Chart)
- #11 UK Singles Chart

== Hush version ==
"Bony Moronie"

Single by Hush

from the album Rough Tough 'n' Ready
- B-side: "Rocking Gypsy King"
- Released: April 1975
- Genre: Glam rock
- Songwriter: Larry Williams

Hush singles chronology
"C’Mon We’re Taking Over" (1974)	"Bony Moronie" (1975)	"Glad All Over" (1975)

In April 1975, Australian glam rock band Hush released a version, which peaked at number 4. The band performed the song on Countdown. Australian musicologist, Ian McFarlane said that "One of the defining moments of Australia's 1970s pop legacy was undoubtably Hush performing "Boney Moronie" (on Countdown)" He described how "Keith Lamb wiggled his satin flares-encased bum, thrust out his crotch and leered at the camera with a mischievous look in his eyes (and all the little girls understood). Les Gock dashed around the set in stack-heeled boots and glam threads, with peroxided streaks in his flowing, jet-black hair. Rick Lum hammed it up in a serious kind of way. Chris Pailthorpe cheerfully revealed his goofy, gap-toothed grin whenever the camera panned across his face."

The song was the first single from the band's fourth studio album, Rough Tough 'n' Ready.

=== Track listing ===
7" single (ZS-123)

- side A "Bony Moronie"
- side B "Rocking Gypsy King"

=== Charts ===
==== Weekly charts ====
Chart (1975)	Peak position
Australian Kent Music Report Singles Chart	4

==== Year-end charts ====
Chart (1975)	Peak position
Australia (Kent Music Report)	10

== Other cover versions ==
Several early rock singers recorded their own versions of the song, notably Johnny Burnette, The Standells, Bill Haley and Ritchie Valens. Dick Dale and his Deltones included a version on their 1965 album Rock Out With Dick Dale & His Del-Tones Live At Ciro's. Among others who have used the song are The Cyrkle on their 1966 debut album, Red Rubber Ball, Joni Mitchell during her 1970 concert in Amchitka for Greenpeace, pairing the song with Big Yellow Taxi in a medley. The Who included a 1971 live performance on their 1994 compilation Thirty Years of Maximum R&B; Ronnie Hawkins on his 1972 album "Rock And Roll Resurrection"; Dr. Feelgood included it on their 1974 album Down by the Jetty; Johnny Winter included it on his 1974 album Saints and Sinners and on his 1975 album Captured Live!; Showaddywaddy and Julie Covington recorded for the 1977 Amnesty International benefit show The Mermaid Frolics, Gram Parsons performed it live in 1973, the performance was released in 1982 on Live 1973. Gram's friends, The Crickets, also recorded the song in 1974; Gram had planned to join them in the studio. James Booker covered the song on his album Resurrection Of The Bayou Maharajah (1993) as part of a medley with "Slow Down", "Knock On Wood", "I Heard It Through The Grapevine", and "Classified". Kari Peitsamo released a translated cover version "Jaana S." on his debut album Jatsin syvin olemus (1977).

=== French, Spanish and Serbo-Croatian versions ===
Les Habits Jaunes made a French cover version entitled "Miss Boney Maronie" in 1965.

The song was translated into Spanish by Enrique Guzmán and Manny Martinez, who renamed it "Popotitos".

Originally released as a single in 1961 by Guzman's and Martinez's band Los Teen Tops, "Popotitos" was also covered by a wide range of Spanish-speaking artists such as Ricky Martin and Miguel Ríos. The song was recorded by Argentinian rock/pop group Serú Girán in 1982, which introduced "Popotitos" to younger generations, and made it a hit again across Latin America.

A Serbo-Croatian version of the song was recorded by Yugoslav avant-garde rock band Laboratorija Zvuka and released on their 1982 album Duboko u tebi.

=== Rumoured Beatles versions ===
According to biographer Mark Lewisohn, the Beatles (first as the Quarrymen) regularly performed the song, from 1957 until 1961 with John Lennon on lead vocal, but there is no known recorded version. Lennon himself recorded it for his 1975 album, Rock 'n' Roll. Roy Young recorded a single version in 1972 (liner notes CD set Roy Young The Best of 50 Years). Additionally three of Lennon's original Quarrymen cut a version during rehearsal in 1993 that came out on CD as The Quarry Men - The Rehearsal Tapes, copyrighted and privately released in 2004 (only via website sales, now out of print).

== Legacy ==
Wilson Pickett's hit 1966 song "Land of a Thousand Dances" mentions "Bony Moronie". The lyrics of James Taylor’s “Suite for 20G,” the closing cut on his 1970 album “Sweet Baby James,” contain the line “Boney Moroney and Peggy Sue/Got the rockin’ pneumonia/Got the boogie woogie flu,” a shout-out to Buddy Holly and Huey "Piano" Smith as well as Larry Williams. In the song "Land" on the album Horses (1975), Patti Smith refers to "Bony Moronie". Echo & the Bunnymen's 1984 song "My Kingdom" includes the lyric "Do you know how to dance like Bony Moronie?” The 1986 song "Good Times" by INXS and Jimmy Barnes, which makes many references to classic rock & roll, features the lyric "Bony Maronie's gonna be with Jim/I said long tall Sally's gonna be with Slim".
