= The Blackmail Starters Kit =

EP of remixes by Spahn Ranch
- Released: April 1, 1994
- Studio: JLab Studio (Los Angeles, California)
- Genre: Industrial rock
- Length: 25:29
- Label: Cleopatra
- Producer: Matt Green; Rob Morton

Spahn Ranch chronology
Collateral Damage (1993)	The Blackmail Starters Kit (1994)	Breath and Taxes (1994)

The Blackmail Starters Kit is the second EP by Spahn Ranch, released on April 1, 1994 by Cleopatra Records. It contain remixes from the band's 1993 debut studio album Collateral Damage.

== Reception ==
Jon Worley of Aiding & Abetting commended The Blackmail Starters Kit EP for being a stylistic departure from the band's debut studio album and said "mixing elements of heavy industrial, goth and just plain meanness, Spahn Ranch creates a picture of the world that is sparse and unyielding." Option compared the band favorably to Ministry and Nine Inch Nails and claimed "the beats aren't altogether mechanical, the guitar grind is often captivating, and the vocals are appropriately buried in electronic dirt."

== Track listing ==
All lyrics are written by Athan Maroulis.

No.	Title	Music	Remixer(s)	Length
1.	"CON"	Matt Green; Athan Maroulis; Rob Morton		3:48
2.	"Antibody" (Conspiracy Mix)	Green; Maroulis; Morton	Matt Green	3:29
3.	"Forceps" (Sterilized Mix)	Maroulis; Morton	Judson Leach	3:58
4.	"Breath and Taxes" (Deductable Mix)	Maroulis; Morton	Judson Leach	4:01
5.	"Commination" (Demo 1991)	Morton		4:26
6.	"Kenneth, What's the Frequency?"	Green; Morton		5:34
7.	"Untitled"	Morton		0:12

== Personnel ==
Adapted from The Blackmail Starters Kit liner notes.

Spahn Ranch

- Matt Green – sampler, keyboards, production (1–4, 6, 7), remix (2)
- Athan Maroulis – lead vocals
- Rob Morton – programming, sampler, production, recording (5)

Production and design

- Thomas Eakins – painting
- Judson Leach – recording (1–4, 6, 7), remix (3, 4)
- Christopher Payne – cover art, illustrations, design

== Release history ==
Region	Date	Label	Format	Catalog
United States	1994	Cleopatra	CD	CLEO 9472
