= Spahn Ranch (band) =

American electro-industrial group

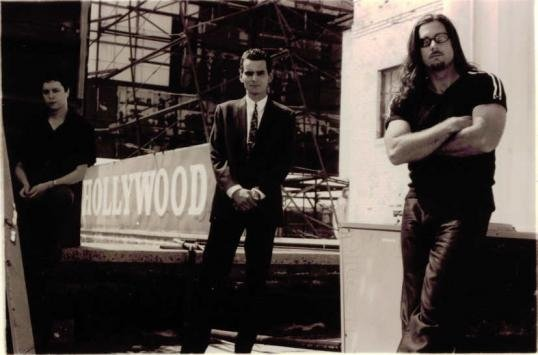
- Spahn Ranch in 1998

Background information
- Origin: Los Angeles, California, U.S.
- Genres: Electro-industrial
- Years active: 1992–2000
- Labels: Cleopatra; Zoth Ommog; Out of Line; Cryonica Music
- Past members: Scott Franklin; Matt Green; Harry Lewis; Athan Maroulis; Rob Morton
- Website: facebook.com/spahnranch

Spahn Ranch was an American electro-industrial group from Los Angeles. Active from 1992 to 2000, the band played a subgenre of industrial music with its fusion of electronic dance, industrial and gothic music.

== History ==
The band was formed in 1992 in Los Angeles by Matt Green and his New York–based collaborator, Rob Morton. The band's name refers to the Spahn Ranch movie filming location in the hills north of Los Angeles. They collectively used the funds they had saved up to jump-start the band. Rob Morton had been Matt Green's musical partner for five years prior. That same year in 1992, they signed to Cleopatra Records and released their four-song EP Spahn Ranch, with vocals supplied by Scott "Chopper" Franklin (later to become the bass player for the Cramps).

In 1993, they added vocalist Athan Maroulis and recorded their first full-length album, Collateral Damage. Their second album, The Coiled One, appeared two years later in the midst of Morton leaving the band due to creative and logistical differences. After his departure, the line-up was expanded to include Christian Death drummer David Glass, Screams for Tina guitarist Kent Bancroft, and Tubalcain drummer Harry Lewis. This offered a beginning of the fuller, more diverse, dark electro-industrial sound that Spahn Ranch would continue to pursue. By 1997, Spahn Ranch had pared themselves down to the three-piece unit of Green, Maroulis and Lewis.

Spahn Ranch continued to release albums throughout the late 1990s. Architecture, released in 1997, featured contributions from Killing Joke/Prong bassist Paul Raven and Rockats/Nancy Sinatra guitarist Danny B. Harvey. This album took an even more experimental approach to the Spahn Ranch sound, incorporating elements of drum and bass, dub and for the first time, live guitar parts. Beat Noir, in 1998, followed a similar path even further and included work with Bauhaus/Love & Rockets bassist David J. The compilation Anthology 1992–1994 was released in 2000 and contained the band's first four releases in addition to previously unreleased material.

The band regularly toured throughout North America during their existence with the likes of Front Line Assembly, Front 242, Switchblade Symphony and Apoptygma Berzerk. Spahn Ranch also made a couple of European treks prior to their demise as a group in 2000.

Closure, their final album, was recorded in 2000 and released in 2001.

== Discography ==
Studio Albums

- Collateral Damage (1993, Cleopatra)
- The Coiled One (1995, Cleopatra)
- Architecture (1997, Cleopatra)
- Beat Noir (1998, Out of Line/Sub/Mission)
- Closure (2001, Cleopatra)

Extended plays

- Spahn Ranch (1992, Cleopatra)
- The Blackmail Starters Kit (1994, Cleopatra)
- Breath and Taxes (1994, Zoth Ommog)
- In Parts Assembled Solely (1996, Cleopatra)
- Retrofit EP (1998, Cleopatra)

Compilation albums

- Anthology 1992–1994 (2000, Cleopatra)

Music videos

- "Breath and Taxes" (1993)
- "Locusts" (1995), directed by Joseph Kahn

Compilation appearances (non-LP tracks)

- The Whip – "Machine Politics (Original Version)" (1993) Cleopatra, US (CD and cassette) / Music Research, Germany / Jungle Records, UK (CD only)
- Mysterious Encounters – "Antibody (Alternate Mix)" (1994) Cleopatra, US (CD and cassette)
- Industrial Revolution Second Edition – "Succumber (Blacklist)" (1994) Cleopatra, US (CD)
- Body Rapture Volume 4 – "Succumber (Blacklist)" (1994) Zoth Ommog, Germany (CD)
- A Saucerful of Pink – "One of These Days" (1995) Cleopatra, US / Cherry Red Records, UK (CD)
- The Digital Space Between Vol 2 – "Forceps (Fezmix)" (1995,)Cleopatra, US / Hard Records, Denmark (CD)
- There Is No Time – "One of These Days (different mix)" (1995) Ras Dva, US (CD)
- Industrial Revolution Third Edition – "Vortex (Extended Mix)" (1996) Cleopatra, US (CD)
- Vertigo Compilation 3 1996 – "Locusts (Pygmy Children Mix)" (1996) Germany (promo-only CD available with Vertigo magazine)
- Covered in Black – "Shot Down in Flames" (1997) Cleopatra, US / RCA Victor, Japan / Zebra-Cherry Red Records, UK (CD)
- Ultimate Drum 'N' Bass – "The Mark Inside" (1997) Hypnotic, US (CD)
- Electronic Lust v. 1 – "In the Aftermath (Astralasia Mix 2)" (1998) Orkus, Germany (CD)
- Hymns of the Warlock – "Dig It" (1998) Cleopatra, US (CD)
- The Black Bible – "An Exit (Alternate Mix)" (1999) Cleopatra, US (CD)
- Virgin Voices – "Swim" (1999) Cleopatra, US / RCA Victor, Japan (CD)
- We Will Follow – "I Will Follow" 1999, Cleopatra, US / Anagram Records, UK (CD)
- Awake the Machines Vol. 2 – "Remnants (CKultur Mutation mix)" (1999) Out of Line, Germany (CD)
- Darken My Fire – "Strange Days" (2000) Cleopatra, US / EMI, Japan / Anagram Records, UK (CD)
