= Clarence Garlow =

American guitarist, singer and songwriter

Background information
- Also known as: Clarence "Bon Ton" Garlow
- Born: Clarence Joseph Garlow; February 27, 1911; Welsh, Louisiana, U.S.
- Died: July 24, 1986 (aged 75) Beaumont, Texas
- Genres: Rhythm and blues; jump blues; Texas blues; cajun
- Occupations: Musician; songwriter
- Instruments: Guitar; accordion; singing
- Years active: Late 1940s – early 1960s (musical career)
- Labels: Feature; Aladdin; Flair; Goldband

Clarence Joseph Garlow (February 27, 1911 – July 24, 1986) was an American guitarist, singer and songwriter who performed in the R&B, jump blues, Texas blues and cajun styles. He is best known for his recording of the song "Bon Ton Roula", which was a hit single on the U.S. Billboard R&B chart in 1950. One commentator called it "a rhythm and blues laced-zydeco song that helped introduce the Louisiana music form to a national audience."

== Biography ==
Clarence Joseph Garlow was born in Welsh, Jefferson Davis Parish, Louisiana, and moved to Beaumont, Texas, with his family when he was a child. He learned the rudiments of playing the fiddle as a youngster. In his teenage years he learned to play the guitar and accordion. His guitar playing was influenced by T-Bone Walker. He worked in several factories before recording for Macy's, a small record label in Houston, Texas, in 1949. His debut release, "She's So Fine" backed with "Blues As You Like It", was issued in January 1950.

For the follow-up, Garlow recorded his own song "Bon Ton Roula", a sixteen-bar blues with "an insistent, swirling rhumba rhythm". "The song featured some of the same kind of broken Cajun-isms as Hank Williams's 'Jambalaya'". It became a hit in 1950, reaching number seven on the Billboard R&B chart. Following the success of the single, Garlow toured in Texas and Louisiana. Feature Records then released another version of his hit, retitled "New Bon Ton Roula". Lyric Records issued two more singles in 1951, but neither made the record charts. The following year, Garlow opened the Bon Ton Drive-In in Beaumont. Relocating to Los Angeles, California, he recorded his third version of "Bon Ton Roula", issued by Aladdin Records as "New Bon-Ton Roulay" in April 1953.

Flair Records released "Crawfishin'" backed with "Route 90" in November 1953, for which he was credited on the label as "Bon Ton" Garlow.

Garlow returned to Beaumont in late 1954 and toured with Clifton Chenier, billed as the Two Crazy Frenchmen. Garlow also undertook further recordings, released by Feature, Folk Star, and Goldband Records over the next few years. None had success outside of his local area, and Garlow was by then working as a DJ for the Beaumont-based radio station KJET, for which he hosted the Bon Ton Show until 1961. By this time Garlow had ceased performing and recording, but he continued working in radio in Beaumont and later in Orange, Texas, until the early 1970s. He supplemented his income by working as a mail carrier. He infrequently played locally in the early 1980s, and he performed at the 1984 San Francisco Blues Festival.

Garlow died in July 1986 in Beaumont, aged 75.

== Legacy ==
Garlow is sometimes credited with "Please Accept My Love", which was recorded by Jimmy Wilson in 1958. Later that year, it became a hit for B.B. King, when his single reached number nine on Billboard's R&B chart. Described as having a "swamp pop flavour" by music historian Colin Escott, the song was a staple of King's live shows, with recordings appearing on Live in Cook County Jail (1971) and on the 40th anniversary deluxe box set of the Rolling Stones' Get Yer Ya-Ya's Out! (2010).

Other Garlow songs have been recorded by Lonnie Brooks ("Bon Ton Roulet" on Lone Star Shootout), Johnny Winter ("Bon Ton Roulet" on Raisin' Cain and "Route 90" on Serious Business), Gary Primich ("Route 90" on Mr. Freeze), Marcia Ball ("Crawfishin'" on Let Me Play with Your Poodle), among others.

== Discography ==
Singles:

| Year | Title (A-side / B-side) | Record label | | | |
|---|---|---|---|---|---|
| Year | Title (A-side / B-side) | Record label | 1949 | "She's So Fine" / "Blues As You Like It" | Macy's (5001) |
| 1950 | "Bon Ton Roula" / "In a Boogie Mood" | Macy's (5002) | | | |
| 1950 | "Bound to Lose My Mind" / "Jumpin' for Joy" | Macy's (5012) | | | |
| 1951 | "New Bon Ton Roola" / "Let Me Be Your Santa" | Feature (1000) | | | |
| 1951 | "Louisiana Blues" / "Watch Your Business" | Lyric (100) | | | |
| 1951 | "Wrong Doing Woman" / "Trouble With My Woman" | Lyric (101) | | | |
| 1953 | "New Bon-Ton Roulay" / "Dreaming" | Aladdin (3179) | | | |
| 1953 | "You Got Me Crying" / "I'm Hurt" | Aladdin (3225) | | | |
| 1954 | "Crawfishin'" / "Route 90" | Detour (003) | | | |
| 1954 | "Cry Cry Baby" / "I'll Never Hold It Against You" | Feature (3003) | | | |
| 1954 | "If I Keep on Worrying" / "I Called You Up Daddy" | Feature (3005) | | | |
| 1954 | "Crawfishin'" / "Route 90" | Flair (1021) | | | |
| 1954 | "Za Belle" / "Make Me Cry" | Folk Star (GF-1130) | | | |
| 1954 | "No No Baby" / "I Feel Like Calling You" | Folk Star (GF-1199) | | | |
| 1956 | "Purty Little Doolie" / "Sundown" | Goldband (G-1043) | | | |
| 1957 | "Clear My Nights of Misery" / "Mad Dog"" | Goldband (G-1045) | | | |
| 1957 | "Bon Ton Roule (Good Times Roll)" / "Sound the Bell" | Goldband (G-1065) | | | |
| 1962 | "Sound the Bell" / "Train Fare Home" | Bon-Ran (No. 501) | | | |
| 1982 | "Bon Ton Roule" / "My Sweet Honey Bee" | Bally Hoo (1019) | | | |

Compilation albums of Garlow's recordings include:

| Year | Title | Record label | | | |
|---|---|---|---|---|---|
| Year | Title | Record label | 1982 | Clarence Garlow: 1951–1958 | Flyright (UK) |
| 2003 | Clarence Garlow | La Cienega (Spain) | | | |
