= Collateral Damage (album) =

Studio album by Spahn Ranch
- Released: September 20, 1993
- Recorded: April – May 1993
- Studio: JLab Studio (Los Angeles, California)
- Genre: Industrial rock
- Length: 42:07
- Label: Cleopatra
- Producer: Matt Green; Rob Morton

Spahn Ranch chronology
Spahn Ranch (1992)	Collateral Damage (1993)	The Blackmail Starters Kit (1994)

Alternative cover
- Zoth Ommog cover

Collateral Damage is the debut studio album of Spahn Ranch, released on September 20, 1993 by Cleopatra Records. The album marked the debut of Athan Maroulis, who continued to serve as the band's main vocalist and lyricist for the remainder of their existence. Maroulis began writing for the album three weeks after joining Spahn Ranch and has said that he was primarily listening to drum and bass producer Klute during its recording sessions. Spahn Ranch toured the United States for the first time in promotion of Collateral Damage

== Reception ==
Jon Worley of Aiding & Abetting called Collateral Damage a "strident industrial soundtrack" and said "Spahn Ranch merely cuts through all pretense and serves up 10 tracks of pure vitriol" Keyboard commended the band's resistance to being pigeonholed. Critic Dave Thompson said "Ranch's industrial anguish and fury seethes with barely repressed emotion" and they "create a hard-hitting and provocative indictment of life's injustices, filled with anger, angst, and bleakness."

Option criticized the music for being recorded poorly and for being derivative of Ministry and Skinny Puppy. The critic concluded by noting "this is a band that hasn't found its voice yet; everything is cliché from the music to the unappetizing cadaver shot on the cover, which was obviously purloined from a medical textbook — talk about cheesy."

== Track listing ==
No.	Title	Writer(s)	Length
1.	"Wires"	Athan Maroulis; Rob Morton	5:24
2.	"Succumber"	Matt Green; Maroulis; Morton	4:34
3.	"Forceps"	Maroulis; Morton	4:28
4.	"Antibody"	Green; Maroulis; Morton	3:20
5.	"Cesium 137"	Maroulis; Morton	4:41
6.	"Breath and Taxes"	Maroulis; Morton	4:22
7.	"Stoma"	Maroulis; Morton	3:39
8.	"Peel"	Maroulis; Morton	1:42
9.	"Machine Politics"	Green; Morton	3:30
10.	"Quince"	Green; Maroulis; Morton	5:27
11.	"Chuck"	Morton	1:00

== Personnel ==
Adapted from the Collateral Damage liner notes.

Spahn Ranch

- Matt Green – sampler, keyboards, production, mixing
- Athan Maroulis – lead vocals, mixing
- Rob Morton – programming, sampler, loops, production, mixing

Production and design

- Judson Leach – recording, mixing, editing, mastering and additional programming (4)
- Christopher Payne – cover art, illustrations, design
- Patty Whizenhunt – photography

== Release history ==
Region	Date	Label	Format	Catalog
United States	1993	Cleopatra	CD, CS	CLEO 7109
Germany	1994	Zoth Ommog	CD	ZOT 105
United States	1995	Cleopatra	CD	CLEO 90052
