= Les Gock =

Australian musician, producer and sound designer (born 1954)

- Born: Leslie Gock; 1954 (age 71–72); Australia
- Genres: Pop, glam rock
- Occupations: Musician, producer, sound designer
- Instrument: Guitar
- Years active: 1970–present
- Labels: Wizard, Song Zu

Leslie Gock (born 1954) is an Australian musician, producer and sound designer. He joined the glam rock band Hush in 1972. Gock played lead guitar, and was also a songwriter and co-producer. The group received 12 gold records during his time in the band. After leaving Hush in 1976, Gock became a music and sound design director for film and television soundtracks, receiving industry recognition by Gold Clios, Facts Awards, and New York International Advertising Festival Awards. Gock also wrote the club song for the Canberra Raiders Rugby League team.

== Biography ==
Leslie Gock was born in 1954. He was a member of a school-based band in 1970, he remembered their first gig, "an audience of a thousand kids." In 1971 he began as a music and sound designer for film and TV. Hush were formed in Sydney in 1971 as a five-piece light pop group by Robin Jackson on guitar, John Koutts on drums, Keith Lamb on lead vocals, Rick Lum on bass guitar and Chris Nolan on keyboards. Gock was in a group, Chariot, and saw Hush performing "I wanted to check our competition... [they] were very professional, but not ballsey enough." In April of the following year Gock joined Hush on lead guitar together with Chris "Smiley" Pailthorpe on drums to form a four-piece glam rock line-up with Lamb and Lum.

In 1977 Gock founded Song Zu, a music and sound design company.

He sold Song Zu in 2001 and started a new business, Les Gock Sound Thinking, which specialised in audio branding. He has been Chairman of the Australasian Writers and Art Directors Association (AWARD) and was the Chairman of the Commercial Music Producers Association (CMPA).

Gock was the main composer of the Network 10 news theme.

== Personal life ==
Gock attended Sydney Technical High School.

Gock has two adult sons, Adam and Chad, with his wife of 49 years, Mulan (a.k.a. Margaret).

== Discography ==
=== Singles ===
List of singles, with selected chart positions
Year	Title	Peak chart positions	Album
Year	Title	AUS	Album
1977	"Everywhere I Go"	86	non album single
