= Larry Williams =

American R&B and rock and roll singer, songwriter and pianist (1935–1980)

Background information
- Born: Lawrence Eugene Williams; May 10, 1935; New Orleans, Louisiana, U.S.
- Died: January 7, 1980 (aged 44) Los Angeles, California, U.S.
- Genres: Rock and roll; R&B; funk; soul
- Occupations: Singer; songwriter; musician; record producer
- Instruments: Vocals, piano
- Years active: 1954–1979
- Labels: Specialty; London; Chess; Okeh; Fantasy

Lawrence Eugene Williams (May 10, 1935 – January 7, 1980) was an American rhythm and blues and rock and roll singer, songwriter, and pianist from New Orleans. He is most notable for writing and recording some rock and roll classics from 1957 to 1959 for Specialty Records, including "Bony Moronie", "Short Fat Fannie", "Slow Down", "Dizzy, Miss Lizzy" (1958), "Bad Boy" and "She Said Yeah" (1959). John Lennon was an admirer, and the Beatles and several other British Invasion groups recorded several of his songs.

Williams' life mixed tremendous success with violence and drug addiction. He was a longtime friend of Little Richard, with whom his life intertwined personally and professionally from their meeting in 1955 to Williams' death in 1980.

== Early life ==
Born in New Orleans, Louisiana, on May 10, 1935, Williams moved west with his family early in his childhood. He spent some time with relatives in Chicago, Illinois, before relocating to Oakland, California in 1945. Williams learned to play piano as a boy. As a teenager, he joined a local R&B band in Oakland when his parents relocated there.

== Career ==
Williams returned to New Orleans in 1954 and began working for his cousin, singer Lloyd Price, as a valet. He played in the bands of Price, Roy Brown, and Percy Mayfield. In 1955, Williams met and developed a friendship with Little Richard, who was recording at the time in New Orleans. Price and Little Richard were both recording for Specialty Records. He was introduced to Robert Blackwell, Specialty's house producer, and was signed to the label.

In 1957, Little Richard was Specialty's biggest star, but he left rock and roll to pursue the ministry. Williams quickly was groomed by Blackwell to try to replicate his success. Using the same raw, shouting vocals and piano-driven intensity, Williams scored with a number of hit singles.

Williams' three biggest successes were "Short Fat Fannie", which was his bestseller, reaching No. 5 in Billboard's pop chart, "Bony Moronie", which peaked at No. 14, and its flip-side "You Bug Me Baby" which made it to No. 45. "Short Fat Fannie" and "Bony Moronie" each sold over one million copies.

After 1957, Williams did not have much success selling records. He recorded a number of songs in 1958 and 1959, including "Dizzy, Miss Lizzy", which charted at No. 69 on Billboard's Pop chart in 1958. "Heebie Jeebies" was recorded with band members such as Plas Johnson on tenor saxophone and Jewel Grant on baritone, René Hall and Howard Roberts on guitars, Gerald Wilson on trumpet, Ernie Freeman or Williams himself on piano, and Earl Palmer on drums. After he was arrested for possession of narcotics and guns in 1959, Williams was dropped from Specialty. He recorded for Chess Records but no hits were produced. Williams then served a three-year jail term, setting back his career considerably.

Williams made a comeback in the mid-1960s with a funky soul band that included Johnny "Guitar" Watson, which paired him musically with Little Richard who had been lured back into secular music. Williams produced two of Little Richard's albums for Okeh Records in 1966 and 1967, which returned Little Richard to the Billboard album chart for the first time in 10 years and spawned the hit single "Poor Dog". He also acted as the music director for Little Richard's live performances at the Okeh Club. Bookings for Little Richard during this period skyrocketed. Williams also recorded and released material of his own and with Watson, with some moderate chart success. "Too Late", the B-side of 1967 single "Two for the Price of One" became one of the biggest songs on the Northern Soul scene in England, and remains prized due to its rarity as the single failed commercially.

Williams also began acting in the 1960s, appearing on film in Just for the Hell of It (1968), The Klansman (1974), and Drum (1976). In the 1970s, Williams was briefly involved with disco music.

== Personal life and death ==
Williams' lifestyle involved recreational drug use and abuse, which resulted in trouble with the law. By the middle of the 1970s, the drug abuse and violence were taking their toll. In 1977, Williams threatened Little Richard with a gun over a drug debt. However, he ended up showing compassion for his longtime friend. This, with other factors, led to Little Richard's return to born again Christianity and the ministry.

Williams was married to Ina Marie Williams, although they were eventually estranged.

On January 7, 1980, Williams' body was found by his mother at his home in Los Angeles, California from a gunshot wound to the head. He was only 44 years old. His death was deemed a suicide, though there was speculation that he was murdered because of his involvement in drugs and, allegedly, prostitution. No suspects were arrested or charged. Williams was interred at Inglewood Park Cemetery, Inglewood, California.

== Martin Albritton as Larry Williams ==
An Illinois drummer and blues singer named Martin Albritton claimed to be Larry Williams, alive and well. This claim originated at about the time Larry Williams was found dead. He had recorded and performed as a drummer for Bobby "Blue" Bland in the 1960s. Albritton toured the country performing under the moniker of "Big" Larry Williams, and claimed that he recorded the hits "Bony Moronie" and "Dizzy Miss Lizzy." He recorded an album in 1990 called Street Party with the Mellow Fellows, previously headed by Big Twist (né Lawrence Millard Nolan; 1937–1990). While touring with the Mellow Fellows in Chicago, Allbritton was confronted by singer Etta James, who knew the real Williams.

Williams' family asked Allbritton to cease billing himself as "Larry Williams". Allbritton died on August 24, 2017.

== Legacy ==
Several of Williams' songs achieved success as revivals, by the Beatles ("Bad Boy", "Slow Down", and "Dizzy, Miss Lizzy"), The Rolling Stones ("She Said Yeah") and John Lennon ("Bony Moronie" and "Dizzy, Miss Lizzy").

Williams was posthumously inducted into the Louisiana Music Hall of Fame in 2014.

== Discography ==
=== Albums ===
- Here's Larry Williams - 1959 (Specialty Records)
- Slow Down With Larry Williams (The Missing And Unissued Sides) - 1960 (Specialty Records)
- Larry Williams On Stage! Recorded Live - 1964 (Sue Records)
- The Larry Williams Show featuring Johnny "Guitar" Watson - 1965 (Decca Records, UK)
- Two For the Price of One (with Johnny "Guitar" Watson) - 1967 (Okeh Records)
- Larry Williams' Greatest Hits - 1967 (Okeh Records - re-recordings of Specialty hits)
- That Larry Williams: The Resurrection of Funk - 1978 (Fantasy Records)
- Unreleased Larry Williams - 1986 (Specialty Records - never before released tracks)

=== Singles ===
| Year | Single (A-side, B-side) Both sides from same album except where indicated | Chart Positions | | | | Album |
| Year | Single (A-side, B-side) Both sides from same album except where indicated | US | US R&B | UK | AUS | Album |
|---|---|---|---|---|---|---|
| 1957 | "Just Because" b/w "Let Me Tell You, Baby" (from Hocus Pocus!) | - | 11 | - | - | Bad Boy -- The Legends of Specialty Series |
| 1957 | "Short Fat Fannie" b/w "High School Dance" (from Bad Boy -- The Legends Of Specialty Series) | 5 | 1 | 21 | 18 | Here's Larry Williams |
| 1957 | "Bony Moronie" | 14 | 4 | 11 | 61 | Here's Larry Williams |
| 1957 | "You Bug Me, Baby" | 45 | - | - | - | Here's Larry Williams |
| 1958 | "Dizzy, Miss Lizzy" b/w "Slow Down" (from Bad Boy -- The Legends Of Specialty Series) | 69 | - | - | - | Here's Larry Williams |
| 1958 | "Hootchy-Koo" b/w "The Dummy" (from Hocus Pocus!) | - | - | - | - | Here's Larry Williams |
| 1958 | "Peaches and Cream" b/w "I Was A Fool" (from Hocus Pocus!) | - | - | - | - | Here's Larry Williams |
| 1959 | "She Said Yeah" b/w "Bad Boy" (from Bad Boy -- Legends Of Specialty Series) | - | - | - | - | The Unreleased Larry Williams |
| 1959 | "Steal A Little Kiss" b/w "I Can't Stop Lovin' You" (from The Unreleased Larry Williams) | - | - | - | - | Hocus Pocus! |
| 1959 | "My Baby's Got Soul" b/w "Everyday I Wonder" | - | - | - | - | Non-album tracks |
| 1959 | "Teardrops" b/w "Give Me Love" | - | - | - | - | Here's Larry Williams |
| 1959 | "Baby, Baby" b/w "Get Ready" | - | - | - | - | Non-album tracks |
| 1960 | "Ting-A-Ling" b/w "Little School Girl" | - | - | - | - | Here's Larry Williams |
| 1960 | "I Wanna Know" b/w "Like A Gentlemen Oughta" | - | - | - | - | Non-album tracks |
| 1960 | "I Hear My Baby" b/w "Oh Baby" (from Bad Boy -- Legends Of Specialty Series) | - | - | - | - | Non-album tracks |
| 1961 | "Fresh Out Of Tears" b/w "Lawdy Mama" | - | - | - | - | Non-album tracks |
| 1963 | "Woman" b/w "Can't Help Myself" | - | - | - | - | Non-album tracks |
| 1965 | "It's Beatle Time"—Part 1 b/w Part 2 Both sides with Johnny Watson | - | - | - | - | Non-album tracks |
| 1966 | "Boss Lovin'" b/w "Call On Me" | - | - | - | - | Non-album tracks |
| 1966 | "I'd Rather Fight Than Switch" b/w "This Old Heart (Is So Lonely)" (Non-album track) | - | - | - | - | Two For The Price Of One |
| 1967 | "Mercy, Mercy, Mercy" b/w "A Quitter Never Wins"; Both sides with Johnny Watson | 96 | 23 | - | - | Two For The Price Of One |
| 1967 | "I Am The One" b/w "You Ask For One Good Reason" | - | - | - | - | Non-album tracks |
| 1967 | "Two For The Price Of One" b/w "Too Late"; Both sides with Johnny Watson | - | - | - | - | Two For The Price Of One |
| 1967 | "Just Because" b/w "Boss Lovin'" | - | - | - | - | Non-album tracks |
| 1968 | "Nobody" with The Kaleidoscope b/w "Find Yourself Someone To Love"; Both sides with Johnny Watson | - | 40 | - | - | Non-album tracks |
| 1968 | "Shake Your Body Girl" b/w "Love, I Can't Seem To Find It" | - | - | - | - | Non-album tracks |
| 1968 | "Wake Up" b/w "Love, I Can't Seem To Find It" | - | - | - | - | Non-album tracks |
| 1969 | "Can't Find No Substitute For Love" b/w "I Could Love You Baby"; Both sides with Johnny Watson | - | - | - | - | Non-album tracks |
| 1977 | "Doing The Best I Can" b/w "Gimme Some" | - | - | - | - | Non-album tracks |
| 1977 | "One Thing Or The Other"—Part 1 b/w Part 2 | - | - | - | - | That Larry Williams |
| 1978 | "The Resurrection Of Funk" (stereo) b/w The Resurrection Of Funk (mono) (promo single) | - | - | - | - | That Larry Williams |
