= Keith Lamb (musician) =

Australian singer (born 1952)

Background information
- Born: 9 January 1952 (age 74); Norwich, England
- Genres: Rock
- Occupations: Singer; songwriter; music producer; game designer
- Instrument: Vocals
- Years active: 1970–present

Keith Lamb (born 9 January 1952) is an English-born Australian musician who was the lead singer and founding member of the 1970s glam rock band, Hush. He had been singing since the age of ten, fronting English bands including Mr. Toad, The Case and Sleepy Talk. Mr. Toad supported UK acts including the Who and the Equals.

Lamb emigrated to Australia in 1970 with his school friend, Hush guitarist Robin Jackson.

== Career ==
Lamb co-wrote Hush's music with guitarist Les Gock. He was one of Australia's better-known front men of the 1970s, along with Bon Scott. On the death of Scott, Lamb was considered as a replacement for the AC/DC band. Lamb lived for performing and was heartbroken when Hush split up. He went on to produce the work of bands Airport, Larry, and the Keith Lamb Band, but none had the commercial success of Hush. He also produced the albums Pioneers (platinum) and Jesus Christ Superstar Choir Sing Carols. Lamb has mentored and supported many up-coming artists, including Sharon O'Neill. He appeared in the Australian musical Jesus Christ Superstar, as Anas the Priest.

Lamb also wrote songs for other artists and bands. With Alan Lancaster of Status Quo, Lamb co-wrote several songs for Status Quo between 1979 and 1983, including the top ten hits "Ol' Rag Blues", "Over the Edge", and "I Want the World to Know".

Falling into schizophrenia, Keith reconnected with a nurse he had first met when he asked her the way to the Palais Theatre, Warrnambool. He invited Louise Howland and her friend to the show that night. When they met again at Royal Park Hospital, Melbourne, Howland assisted Lamb to recover and rebuild. They later went into business together, with Rajmahal and The Art of Conversation, a series of resources.

Lamb performs at solo gigs, such as the Lifeline Concert in Cairns. He remains involved creatively with music, art, and sculpture and is a business partner in the Bendigo embroidery company Rajmahal. He has two children. Lamb is also the co-author of the party card game, The Art of Conversation.

He lives in Bendigo, Victoria.

== Countdown Spectacular ==
In 2006, Lamb performed with other members of his band, Hush, as part of the Countdown Spectacular Tour under the auspices of Michael Gudinski. The first tour was staged from June to August 2006. It featured mainly Australian artists and groups, some re-forming specially for the tour, plus several international artists now living in Australia.
