= Cyclos =

Studio album by Dilate
- Released: February 13, 1996
- Recorded: 1992 –
- Genre: Ambient
- Length: 77:12
- Label: Hypnotic

Dilate chronology
Cyclos (1996)	Octagon (1997)

Alternative cover
- 2009 digital cover

Cyclos is the debut studio album of Dilate, released on February 13, 1996 by Hypnotic Records.

== Music ==
Tracks from Cyclos were promoted somewhat strongly by Cleopatra Records and released on multiple various artists compilations. The track "Tangerine Sky" appeared on collections Space Box: 1970 & Beyond (Space, Krautrock & Acid Trips) by Cleopatra and the album's coda "Uduism" appeared on Ambient Time Travellers by Hypnotic Records. The track "Oblivium" was released on six various artist compilations: Space Daze 2000: A Mind Journey of Electronic Ambient Space Rock in 1996 by Cleopatra, This Is Space: The Space Daze Trilogy in 1997 by Cleopatra, DJ Technical's Hypnotic Illusions in 1997 by Hypnotic/Outloud, In to the Mix in 1997 by Hypnotic, Electronica Classix in 1999 by Alpha Wave, and Classic Electronica in 2001 by Big Eye Music.

The compositions "Colonies" and "Passage" had previously been used as codas on Vampire Rodents' Premonition and Lullaby Land studio albums, released in 1992 and 1993, respectively.

== Reception ==
Professional ratings
Review scores
Source	Rating
Allmusic	4/5 stars

AllMusic awarded Cyclos four out of five possible stars. Offering a contrasting opinion was Keyboard, who was disappointed by the compositions and called them "cupcake music, in other words-not hard to describe, very little like either the Orb or Tangerine Dream, and not very important either, though perfectly adequate for airplay on Hearts of Space." Magical Blend said while the album is not as captivating as its influences, namely Cluster and Tangerine Dream, the music is "a captivating listen-a perfect soundtrack for a hot summer night, with a chorus of crickets in the background."

== Track listing ==
All music is composed by Victor Wulf.

Side one: Cyclos
No.	Title	Length
1.	"Cyclos"	11:31
2.	"Oblivium"	9:27
3.	"Sea Level"	10:21
4.	"Passage"	3:39
5.	"Colonies"	8:10

Side two: Four Scenes
No.	Title	Length
1.	"Gone"	1:37
2.	"Farewell"	2:39
3.	"Croatoa I"	4:41
4.	"Croatoa II"	2:17
5.	"Ice Curtain"	8:07
6.	"Tangerine Sky"	7:36
7.	"Uduism"	9:07

== Personnel ==
Adapted from the Cyclos liner notes.

Dilate

- Victor Wulf – keyboards

Production

- Daniel Vahnke – management

== Release history ==
Region	Date	Label	Format	Catalog
United States	1996		CS	
United States	1996	Hypnotic	CD	96762
United States	2009	Cleopatra	DL	
