= Octagon (Dilate album) =

Studio album by Dilate
- Released: June 24, 1997
- Genre: Ambient
- Length: 147:22
- Label: Hypnotic

Dilate chronology
Cyclos (1996)	Octagon (1997)

Octagon is the second studio album by Dilate, released on June 24, 1997 by Hypnotic Records. The album was re-released in 2000 by Hypnotic as the first disc of the New Age...Spiritual Healing box set.

== Music ==
Tracks from Octagon were promoted by Cleopatra Records and released on several various artists compilations. The composition "Shapeshifter" appeared on the compilations Area 51: The Roswell Incident released in 1997 by Purple Pyramid Records and again in 1999 on Ultimate Space Rock by Cleopatra. The album's lead track "Octagon" appeared on 1999 compilation In to the Mix III by Hypnotic Records.

== Reception ==
Professional ratings
Review scores
Source	Rating
Allmusic	4/5 stars

Jim Brenholts of AllMusic gave Octagon a positive review, calling the album "almost two and a half hours of ambient bliss" and "deep sonic environmental minimalism." Brenholts concluded by saying "there are no flaws or gaps in this set; Wulf has covered it all" and recommended the music to listeners of John Foxx, Brannan Lane, Zero Ohms and Jeff Pearce.

== Track listing ==
All music is composed by Victor Wulf

Disc one
No.	Title	Length
1.	"Octagon"	11:39
2.	"Queen's Favor"	13:03
3.	"Solis"	6:33
4.	"Frozen East"	14:39
5.	"Tale"	7:04
6.	"Insideout"	14:35
7.	"Companion"	4:22

Disc two
No.	Title	Length
1.	"Shapeshifter"	15:14
2.	"Coral"	5:44
3.	"Karnak"	4:58
4.	"Ashes"	5:50
5.	"Caldera"	6:23
6.	"Para"	4:14
7.	"Oracle"	6:56
8.	"Wassertanze"	3:54
9.	"Nemo's Chord"	5:08
10.	"Qaddame"	7:39
11.	"Beacon"	5:05
12.	"Terrace Serpent"	4:23

== Personnel ==
Adapted from the Octagon liner notes.

Dilate

- Victor Wulf – keyboards

Production and additional personnel

- Michael Cripps – photography, design
- Judson Leach – mastering

== Release history ==
Region	Date	Label	Format	Catalog
United States	1997	Hypnotic	CD	CLP 0011
