= In to the Mix =

Compilation album by Various artists
- Released: June 10, 1997
- Genre: Ambient; electronic; techno
- Length: 155:03
- Label: Hypnotic

In to the Mix chronology
In to the Mix (1997)	In to the Mix II (1998)

In to the Mix is a various artists compilation album released on June 10, 1997, by Hypnotic Records.

== Reception ==
Professional ratings
Review scores
Source	Rating
AllMusic	2.5/5 stars

AllMusic gave In to the Mix a two and a half out of five possible stars.

== Track listing ==
Disc one
No.	Title	Artist	Length
1.	"The Prodigy Voodoo People" (Chemical Brothers Remix)	The Prodigy	5:57
2.	"Meat Beat Manifesto Mindstream" (Mind The Bend the Mind Orbital Mix)	Meat Beat Manifesto	8:28
3.	"Instruments of Darkness (All of Us Are People)" (Prodigy Mix)	The Art of Noise	3:40
4.	"Eternal Zeme" (Front 242 Remix)	Talla 2XLC	4:07
5.	"Netherworld" (Edit)	L.S.G.	3:52
6.	"Alpha Wave" (Plastikman Acid House Mix)	System 7	10:45
7.	"Re-United" (Mix 4)	Psychic TV/Andrew Weatherall	4:48
8.	"Renegade Soundwave" (Leftfield Mix)	Renegade Soundwave	7:51
9.	"Clown" (Astralasia Remix)	Switchblade Symphony	4:35
10.	"Feel the Universe" (Koxbox Remix)	Juno Reactor	7:47
11.	"Trance In Time"	Audio Science	4:42
12.	"LCD Megamix" (Mixed by Aqualite)	LCD	5:40
13.	"Outside World" (Seismic Remix)	Sunbeam	5:42

Disc two
No.	Title	Artist	Length
1.	"Outface" (G60 Mix)	Komakino	6:42
2.	"Helium"	Bypass Unit	4:21
3.	"Pink Button"	Kinder Atom	4:40
4.	"Stab"	DIN	6:36
5.	"Sack Says Air"	Giez	5:01
6.	"In a Gentle Mood"	Nature™	5:38
7.	"Concentrations"	Surface 10	5:47
8.	"Now Is Forever"	THE BRAIN	5:51
9.	"The Ba & The Ka"	Anubian Lights	6:02
10.	"Into the Abyss"	R-Escape-R	5:45
11.	"Funky Alienation"	Xylon	6:29
12.	"Hymlock"	Cathexis	7:21
13.	"Oblivium"	Dilate	6:58

== Personnel ==
Adapted from the In to the Mix liner notes.

- Eunah Lee – cover art, illustrations, design

== Release history ==
Region	Date	Label	Format	Catalog
United States	1997	Hypnotic	CD	CLP 9991
