= Primetime Emmy Award for Outstanding Music Composition for a Series (Original Dramatic Score) =

Primetime Emmy Award for Music Composition for a Series (Original Dramatic Score)
- Awarded for: Outstanding Music Composition for a Series (Original Dramatic Score)
- Country: United States
- Presented by: Academy of Television Arts & Sciences
- First award: 1955
- Currently held by: David Fleming, Widow's Bay (2026)
- Website: emmys.com

This is a list of winners and nominees of the Primetime Emmy Award for Outstanding Music Composition for a Series (Original Dramatic Score).

Starting in 2019, the category recognizes scripted programs. Unscripted programs compete for Music Composition for a Documentary Series or Special (Original Dramatic Score).

== Winners and nominations ==
=== 1960s ===
Year	Program	Episode	Nominee(s)	Network
1966 (18th)	Michelangelo: The Last Giant		Laurence Rosenthal	NBC
1966 (18th)	Bonanza		David Rose	NBC
1966 (18th)	Gunsmoke	"Seven Hours to Dawn"	Morton Stevens	CBS
1966 (18th)	I Spy		Earle Hagen	NBC
1966 (18th)	The Making of the President, 1964		Lalo Schifrin	CBS
1966 (18th)	The Man from U.N.C.L.E.		Jerry Goldsmith	NBC
1966 (18th)	Run for Your Life		Pete Rugolo	NBC
1967 (19th)	The Andy Williams Show		Ticker Freeman and George Wyle	NBC
1967 (19th)	CBS Playhouse		Aaron Copland	CBS
1967 (19th)	I Spy		Earle Hagen	NBC
1967 (19th)	Mission: Impossible		Lalo Schifrin	CBS
1967 (19th)	Run for Your Life		Pete Rugolo	NBC
1968 (20th)	I Spy	"Laya"	Earle Hagen	NBC
1968 (20th)	CBS Playhouse	"My Father and My Mother"	Bernard Green	CBS
1968 (20th)	Gunsmoke	"Major Glory"	Morton Stevens	CBS
1968 (20th)	The High Chaparral	"The Champion of the Western World"	Harry Sukman	NBC
1968 (20th)	Mission: Impossible	"The Seal"	Lalo Schifrin	CBS
1968 (20th)	Run for Your Life	"Cry Hard, Cry Fast"	Pete Rugolo	NBC
1969 (21st)	Heidi		John Williams	NBC
1969 (21st)	Hawaii Five-O	"Pilot"	Morton Stevens	CBS
1969 (21st)	Hemingway's Spain: A Love Affair		Jacques Belasco	ABC
1969 (21st)	Mission: Impossible	"The Heir Apparent"	Lalo Schifrin	CBS
1969 (21st)	The Outcasts	"Take Your Lover In The Ring"	Hugo Montenegro	ABC

Note: Award titled Outstanding Individual Achievements in Music Composition (1966–69)

=== 1970s ===
Year	Program	Episode	Nominee(s)	Network
1970 (22nd)	Hawaii Five-O	"A Thousand Pardons – You're Dead!"	Morton Stevens	CBS
1970 (22nd)	The Bill Cosby Show		Quincy Jones	NBC
1970 (22nd)	Charlie, the Lonesome Cougar		Franklyn Marks	NBC
1971 (23rd)	Bonanza	"The Love Child"	David Rose	NBC
1971 (23rd)	Adam-12	"Elegy for a Pig"	Frank Comstock	NBC
1971 (23rd)	Love, American Style		Charles Fox	ABC
1971 (23rd)	The Name of the Game	"LA 2017"	Billy Goldenberg and Robert Prince	NBC
1972 (24th)	The Bold Ones: The Lawyers	"In Defense of Ellen McKay"	Pete Rugolo	NBC
1972 (24th)	Columbo	"Lady in Waiting"	Billy Goldenberg	NBC
1972 (24th)	Love, American Style		Charles Fox	ABC
1973 (25th)	Love, American Style		Charles Fox	ABC
1973 (25th)	Ironside		Marty Paich	NBC
1973 (25th)	Medical Center	"Cycle of Peril"	Alexander Courage	CBS
1974 (26th)	Hawaii Five-O	"Hookman"	Morton Stevens	CBS
1974 (26th)	Hawaii Five-O	"The $100,000 Nickel"	Bruce Broughton	CBS
1974 (26th)	Hawaii Five-O	"Nightmare in Blue"	Don B. Ray	CBS
1975 (27th)	Benjamin Franklin	"The Rebel"	Billy Goldenberg	CBS
1975 (27th)	The Streets of San Francisco	"One Last Shot"	Patrick Williams	ABC
1976 (28th)	Rich Man, Poor Man		Alex North	ABC
1976 (28th)	Bronk	"Next of Kin"	Jack Urbont	CBS
1976 (28th)	Kojak	"A Question of Answers"	John Cacavas	CBS
1976 (28th)	Little House on the Prairie	"Remember Me"	David Rose	NBC
1977 (29th)	Roots	"Part 1"	Quincy Jones and Gerald Fried	ABC
1977 (29th)	Bronk	"The Vigilante"	Jack Urbont	CBS
1977 (29th)	Captains and the Kings	"Chapter 8"	Elmer Bernstein	NBC
1977 (29th)	Police Story	"Monster Manor"	Dick DeBenedictis	NBC
1977 (29th)	Roots	"Part 8"	Gerald Fried	ABC
1978 (30th)	King		Billy Goldenberg	NBC
1978 (30th)	The Awakening Land		Fred Karlin	NBC
1978 (30th)	Columbo	"Try and Catch Me"	Patrick Williams	NBC
1978 (30th)	Holocaust		Morton Gould	NBC
1978 (30th)	Wheels		Morton Stevens	NBC
1979 (31st)	Little House on the Prairie	"The Craftsman"	David Rose	NBC
1979 (31st)	Dear Detective		Dick DeBenedictis and Dean DeBenedictis	CBS
1979 (31st)	Lou Grant	"Prisoner"	Patrick Williams	CBS
1979 (31st)	The Paper Chase	"A Day in the Life"	Charles Fox and Norman Gimbel	CBS

=== 1980s ===
Year	Program	Episode	Nominee(s)	Network
1980 (32nd)	Lou Grant	"Hollywood"	Patrick Williams	CBS
1980 (32nd)	Dallas	"The Lost Child"	Bruce Broughton	CBS
1980 (32nd)	Eischied	"Only the Pretty Girls Die, Part 2"	John Cacavas	NBC
1980 (32nd)	Paris	"Decisions"	Fred Karlin	CBS
1980 (32nd)	Skag	"Pilot"	Billy Goldenberg	NBC
1981 (33rd)	Buck Rogers in the 25th Century	"The Satyr"	Bruce Broughton	NBC
1981 (33rd)	The Gangster Chronicles	"Chapter 1"	Billy Goldenberg	NBC
1981 (33rd)	Hill Street Blues	"Hill Street Station"	Mike Post	NBC
1981 (33rd)	Little House on the Prairie	"The Lost Ones, Part 1"	David Rose	NBC
1981 (33rd)	Lou Grant	"Stroke"	Patrick Williams	CBS
1982 (34th)	Little House on the Prairie	"He Was Only Twelve, Part 2"	David Rose	NBC
1982 (34th)	Dallas	"The Search"	Bruce Broughton	CBS
1982 (34th)	The Incredible Hulk	"The Triangle"	Joe Harnell	CBS
1982 (34th)	Lou Grant	"Hometown"	Patrick Williams	CBS
1983 (35th)	Dallas	"The Ewing Blues"	Bruce Broughton	CBS
1983 (35th)	The Devlin Connection	"Ring of Kings, Ring of Thieves"	Nan Schwartz	NBC
1983 (35th)	Fame	"Not in Kansas Anymore"	William Goldstein	NBC
1983 (35th)	Father Murphy	"Sweet Sixteen"	David Rose	NBC
1983 (35th)	Knots Landing	"Loss of Innocence"	Jerrold Immel	CBS
1984 (36th)	Dallas	"The Letter"	Bruce Broughton	CBS
1984 (36th)	Emerald Point N.A.S.	"The Homecoming"	Angela Morley	CBS
1984 (36th)	Mr. Smith	"Mr. Smith Falls in Love"	Patrick Williams	NBC
1984 (36th)	St. Elsewhere	"In Sickness and in Health"	J. A. C. Redford	NBC
1984 (36th)	Trapper John, M.D.	"Send in the Clowns"	John Parker	CBS
1985 (37th)	Murder, She Wrote	"The Murder of Sherlock Holmes"	John Addison	CBS
1985 (37th)	Cagney & Lacey	"Organized Crime"	Nan Schwartz	CBS
1985 (37th)	Dynasty	"Triangles"	Angela Morley	ABC
1985 (37th)	Highway to Heaven	"Thoroughbreds"	David Rose	NBC
1985 (37th)	Miami Vice	"Evan"	Jan Hammer	NBC
1985 (37th)	St. Elsewhere	"Fade to White"	J. A. C. Redford	NBC
1986 (38th)	Scarecrow and Mrs. King	"We're Off to See the Wizard"	Arthur B. Rubinstein	CBS
1986 (38th)	Dynasty	"The Subpoenas"	Angela Morley	ABC
1986 (38th)	Miami Vice	"Bushido"	Jan Hammer	NBC
1986 (38th)	Moonlighting	"The Dream Sequence Always Rings Twice"	Alf Clausen	ABC
1987 (39th)	Knots Landing	"Cement the Relationship"	Joel Rosenbaum	CBS
1987 (39th)	Dallas	"A Death in the Family"	Angela Morley	CBS
1987 (39th)	The Days and Nights of Molly Dodd	"Here's Why You Should Never Wear High Heels to the Bank"	Patrick Williams	NBC
1987 (39th)	Jack and Mike	"Come Together"	Nan Schwartz	ABC
1987 (39th)	Matlock	"The Chef"	Dick DeBenedictis	NBC
1987 (39th)	Moonlighting	"Atomic Shakespeare"	Alf Clausen	ABC
1988 (40th)	Beauty and the Beast	"Pilot"	Lee Holdridge	CBS
1988 (40th)	Beauty and the Beast	"To Reign in Hell"	Don Davis	CBS
1988 (40th)	Dallas	"Hustling"	Angela Morley	CBS
1988 (40th)	The Days and Nights of Molly Dodd	"Here's Why You Shouldn't Get Too Attached to Your Cat"	Patrick Williams	NBC
1988 (40th)	Moonlighting	"Here's Living with You, Kid"	Alf Clausen	ABC
1989 (41st)	Falcon Crest	"Dust to Dust"	Joel Rosenbaum	CBS
1989 (41st)	Blue Skies	"The White Horse"	Angela Morley	CBS
1989 (41st)	Columbo	"Murder, Smoke and Shadows"	Patrick Williams	ABC
1989 (41st)	Moonlighting	"A Womb with a View"	Alf Clausen	ABC
1989 (41st)	Star Trek: The Next Generation	"The Child"	Dennis McCarthy	Syndicated

=== 1990s ===
Year	Program	Episode	Nominee(s)	Network
1990 (42nd)	Beauty and the Beast	"A Time to Heal"	Don Davis	CBS
1990 (42nd)	Matlock	"The Clown"	Bruce Babcock	NBC
1990 (42nd)	Star Trek: The Next Generation	"Yesterday's Enterprise"	Dennis McCarthy	Syndicated
1990 (42nd)	Twin Peaks	"Traces to Nowhere"	Angelo Badalamenti	ABC
1991 (43rd)	The Young Riders	"Kansas"	John Debney	ABC
1991 (43rd)	Father Dowling Mysteries	"The Consulting Detective Mystery"	Bruce Babcock	ABC
1991 (43rd)	Jake and the Fatman	"God Bless the Child"	Joel Rosenbaum	CBS
1991 (43rd)	My Life and Times	"The Collapse of '98"	Don Davis	ABC
1991 (43rd)	Star Trek: The Next Generation	"Half a Life"	Dennis McCarthy	Syndicated
1992 (44th)	Matlock	"The Strangler"	Bruce Babcock	NBC
1992 (44th)	In the Heat of the Night	"Family Reunion"	Nan Schwartz	NBC
1992 (44th)	Star Trek: The Next Generation	"Unification I"	Dennis McCarthy	Syndicated
1992 (44th)	The Simpsons	"Treehouse of Horror II"	Alf Clausen	Fox
1993 (45th)	The Young Indiana Jones Chronicles	"Young Indiana Jones and the Scandal of 1920"	Joel McNeely	ABC
1993 (45th)	Murder, She Wrote	"Wind Around the Tower"	Bruce Babcock	CBS
1993 (45th)	Quantum Leap	"Lee Harvey Oswald, Part 1"	Velton Ray Bunch	NBC
1993 (45th)	The Simpsons	"Treehouse of Horror III"	Alf Clausen	Fox
1993 (45th)	The Young Indiana Jones Chronicles	"Vienna, 1908"	Laurence Rosenthal	ABC
1994 (46th)	The Young Indiana Jones Chronicles	"Ireland, 1916"	Laurence Rosenthal	ABC
1994 (46th)	Christy	"Pilot"	Ron Ramin	CBS
1994 (46th)	SeaQuest DSV	"Whale Song"	Don Davis	NBC
1994 (46th)	Star Trek: The Next Generation	"All Good Things..."	Dennis McCarthy	Syndicated
1994 (46th)	The Simpsons	"Cape Feare"	Alf Clausen	Fox
1995 (47th)	SeaQuest DSV	"Daggers"	Don Davis	NBC
1995 (47th)	Murder, She Wrote	"Murder in High C"	Bruce Babcock	CBS
1995 (47th)	Star Trek: Voyager	"Caretaker, Part I"	Jay Chattaway	UPN
1995 (47th)	Star Trek: Voyager	"Heroes and Demons"	Dennis McCarthy	UPN
1995 (47th)	The Simpsons	"Treehouse of Horror V"	Alf Clausen	Fox
1996 (48th)	Picture Windows	"Language of the Heart"	Hummie Mann	Showtime
1996 (48th)	Diagnosis: Murder	"Mind Over Murder"	Dick DeBenedictis	CBS
1996 (48th)	SeaQuest DSV	"Brave New World"	Russ Landau	NBC
1996 (48th)	Space: Above and Beyond	"The River of Stars"	Shirley Walker	Fox
1996 (48th)	Star Trek: Deep Space Nine	"Our Man Bashir"	Jay Chattaway	Syndicated
1997 (49th)	The Cape	"Pilot"	John Debney and Louis Febre	Syndicated
1997 (49th)	Early Edition	"The Choice"	W.G. Snuffy Walden	CBS
1997 (49th)	Orleans	"Pilot"	David Hamilton	CBS
1997 (49th)	The X-Files	"Paper Hearts"	Mark Snow	Fox
1997 (49th)	Xena: Warrior Princess	"Destiny"	Joseph LoDuca	Syndicated
1998 (50th)	Buffy the Vampire Slayer	"Becoming, Part 1"	Christophe Beck	The WB
1998 (50th)	Roar	"Pilot"	Jon Ehrlich	Fox
1998 (50th)	Stargate SG-1	"The Nox"	Joel Goldsmith	Showtime
1998 (50th)	The Simpsons	"Treehouse of Horror VIII"	Alf Clausen	Fox
1998 (50th)	The X-Files	"The Post-Modern Prometheus"	Mark Snow	Fox
1999 (51st)	Invasion America	"Final Mission"	Carl Johnson	The WB
1999 (51st)	Fantasy Island	"Pilot"	John Ottman	ABC
1999 (51st)	The Simpsons	"Treehouse of Horror IX"	Alf Clausen	Fox
1999 (51st)	The X-Files	"S.R. 819"	Mark Snow	Fox
1999 (51st)	Xena: Warrior Princess	"Devi"	Joseph LoDuca	Syndicated

=== 2000s ===
Year	Program	Episode	Nominee(s)	Network
2000 (52nd)	Xena: Warrior Princess	"Fallen Angel"	Joseph LoDuca	Syndicated
2000 (52nd)	Falcone	"Lealta"	Jay Gruska	CBS
2000 (52nd)	Felicity	"Help for the Lovelorn"	Danny Pelfrey and W. G. Snuffy Walden	The WB
2000 (52nd)	Star Trek: Voyager	"Spirit Folk"	Jay Chattaway	UPN
2000 (52nd)	The X-Files	"Theef"	Mark Snow	Fox
2001 (53rd)	Star Trek: Voyager	"Endgame"	Jay Chattaway	UPN
2001 (53rd)	The Simpsons	"Simpson Safari"	Alf Clausen	Fox
2001 (53rd)	Star Trek: Voyager	"Workforce, Part I"	Dennis McCarthy	UPN
2001 (53rd)	The West Wing	"In the Shadow of Two Gunmen"	W. G. Snuffy Walden	NBC
2001 (53rd)	Xena: Warrior Princess	"The Rheingold"	Joseph LoDuca	Syndicated
2002 (54th)	The Blue Planet	"Seas of Life: Ocean World"	George Fenton	Discovery
2002 (54th)	JAG	"Adrift, Part 2"	Steven Bramson	CBS
2002 (54th)	24	"7:00 a.m. – 8:00 a.m."	Sean Callery	Fox
2002 (54th)	The X-Files	"The Truth"	Mark Snow	Fox
2002 (54th)	Xena: Warrior Princess	"A Friend in Need, Part 2"	Joseph LoDuca	Syndicated
2003 (55th)	24	"10:00 p.m. – 11:00 p.m."	Sean Callery	Fox
2003 (55th)	The Agency	"The Great Game"	Jason Derlatka and Jon Ehrlich	CBS
2003 (55th)	Enterprise	"The Expanse"	Dennis McCarthy	UPN
2003 (55th)	JAG	"Need to Know"	Steven Bramson	CBS
2003 (55th)	Odyssey 5	"Pilot"	Laura Karpman	Showtime
2004 (56th)	Enterprise	"Similitude"	Velton Ray Bunch	UPN
2004 (56th)	Dead Like Me	"Pilot"	Stewart Copeland	Showtime
2004 (56th)	Line of Fire	"Eminence Front"	Larry Groupé	ABC
2004 (56th)	Pandemic: Facing AIDS	"Uganda/Thailand"	Philip Glass	HBO
2004 (56th)	The Simpsons	"Treehouse of Horror XIV"	Alf Clausen	Fox
2004 (56th)	24	"6:00 a.m. – 7:00 a.m."	Sean Callery	Fox
2005 (57th)	Lost	"Pilot"	Michael Giacchino	ABC
2005 (57th)	Carnivàle	"Lincoln Highway"	Jeff Beal	HBO
2005 (57th)	House	"Pilot"	Christopher Hoag	Fox
2005 (57th)	The Simpsons	"Treehouse of Horror XV"	Alf Clausen	Fox
2005 (57th)	24	"2:00 a.m. – 3:00 a.m."	Sean Callery	Fox
2006 (58th)	24	"6:00 a.m. – 7:00 a.m."	Sean Callery	Fox
2006 (58th)	Masters of Horror	"Dreams in the Witch House"	Richard Band	Showtime
2006 (58th)	Rome	"Triumph"	Jeff Beal	HBO
2006 (58th)	Stargate Atlantis	"Grace Under Pressure"	Joel Goldsmith	Sci Fi
2006 (58th)	Supernatural	"Pilot"	Christopher Lennertz	The WB
2007 (59th)	Planet Earth	"Pole to Pole"	George Fenton	Discovery
2007 (59th)	CSI: Crime Scene Investigation	"Law of Gravity"	John Keane	CBS
2007 (59th)	Ghost Whisperer	"Love Never Dies"	Mark Snow	CBS
2007 (59th)	Kidnapped	"Pilot"	W. G. Snuffy Walden	NBC
2007 (59th)	Rome	"Philippi"	Jeff Beal	HBO
2007 (59th)	24	"6:00 p.m. – 7:00 p.m."	Sean Callery	Fox
2008 (60th)	Pushing Daisies	"Pigeon"	Jim Dooley	ABC
2008 (60th)	Family Guy	"Lois Kills Stewie"	Ron Jones	Fox
2008 (60th)	House	"Guardian Angels"	Jon Ehrlich and Jason Derlatka	Fox
2008 (60th)	Little People, Big World	"Roloff Road Trip: Grand Canyon"	Joey Newman	TLC
2008 (60th)	Lost	"The Constant"	Michael Giacchino	ABC
2008 (60th)	The Simpsons	"Treehouse of Horror XVIII"	Alf Clausen	Fox
2009 (61st)	Legend of the Seeker	"Prophecy"	Joseph LoDuca	Syndicated
2009 (61st)	Castle	"Flowers from Your Grave"	Robert Duncan	ABC
2009 (61st)	Ghost Whisperer	"Leap of Faith"	Mark Snow	CBS
2009 (61st)	The No. 1 Ladies' Detective Agency	"Pilot"	Gabriel Yared	HBO
2009 (61st)	The Simpsons	"Gone Maggie Gone"	Alf Clausen	Fox
2009 (61st)	24	"7:00 a.m. – 8:00 a.m."	Sean Callery	Fox

=== 2010s ===
Year	Program	Episode	Nominee(s)	Network
2010 (62nd)	24	"3:00 p.m. – 4:00 p.m."	Sean Callery	Fox
2010 (62nd)	Batman: The Brave and the Bold	"Mayhem of the Music Meister!"	Kristopher Carter, Michael Jelenic, Michael McCuistion, Lolita Ritmanis and James Tucker	Cartoon Network
2010 (62nd)	FlashForward	"No More Good Days"	Ramin Djawadi	ABC
2010 (62nd)	Lost	"The End"	Michael Giacchino	ABC
2010 (62nd)	Psych	"Mr. Yin Presents"	Adam Cohen and John Robert Wood	USA
2011 (63rd)	American Masters	"John Muir in the New World"	Garth Neustadter	PBS
2011 (63rd)	Family Guy	"And Then There Were Fewer"	Walter Murphy	Fox
2011 (63rd)	Family Guy	"Road to the North Pole"	Ron Jones	Fox
2011 (63rd)	The Simpsons	"Treehouse of Horror XXI"	Alf Clausen	Fox
2011 (63rd)	30 Rock	"100"	Jeff Richmond	NBC
2012 (64th)	Downton Abbey	"Episode Six"	John Lunn	PBS
2012 (64th)	The Borgias	"The Confession"	Trevor Morris	Showtime
2012 (64th)	Pan Am	"Pilot"	Blake Neely	ABC
2012 (64th)	Smash	"Publicity"	Chris P. Bacon and Marc Shaiman	NBC
2012 (64th)	30 Rock	"The Tuxedo Begins"	Jeff Richmond	NBC
2013 (65th)	Downton Abbey	"Episode Six"	John Lunn	PBS
2013 (65th)	Arrested Development	"Flight of the Phoenix"	David Schwartz	Netflix
2013 (65th)	The Borgias	"The Prince"	Trevor Morris	Showtime
2013 (65th)	House of Cards	"Chapter 1"	Jeff Beal	Netflix
2013 (65th)	Last Resort	"Captain"	Robert Duncan	ABC
2013 (65th)	Mr Selfridge	"Episode 1"	Charlie Mole	PBS
2014 (66th)	Cosmos: A Spacetime Odyssey	"Standing Up in the Milky Way"	Alan Silvestri	Fox
2014 (66th)	Downton Abbey	"Episode Eight"	John Lunn	PBS
2014 (66th)	Game of Thrones	"The Mountain and the Viper"	Ramin Djawadi	HBO
2014 (66th)	House of Cards	"Chapter 26"	Jeff Beal	Netflix
2014 (66th)	True Detective	"Form and Void"	T Bone Burnett	HBO
2015 (67th)	House of Cards	"Chapter 32"	Jeff Beal	Netflix
2015 (67th)	Chef's Table	"Francis Mallmann"	Duncan Thum	Netflix
2015 (67th)	Outlander	"Sassenach"	Bear McCreary	Starz
2015 (67th)	The Paradise	"Episode 8"	Maurizio Malagnini	PBS
2015 (67th)	Penny Dreadful	"Closer Than Sisters"	Abel Korzeniowski	Showtime
2015 (67th)	Tyrant	"Pilot"	Jeff Danna and Mychael Danna	FX
2016 (68th)	Mr. Robot	"eps1.0 hellofriend.mov"	Mac Quayle	USA
2016 (68th)	Bates Motel	"Forever"	Chris Bacon	A&E
2016 (68th)	Chef's Table	"Grant Achatz"	Duncan Thum	Netflix
2016 (68th)	Limitless	"Pilot"	Paul Leonard-Morgan	CBS
2016 (68th)	Minority Report	"Pilot"	Sean Callery	Fox
2016 (68th)	Penny Dreadful	"And They Were Enemies"	Abel Korzeniowski	Showtime
2017 (69th)
2017 (69th)	House of Cards	"Chapter 63"	Jeff Beal	Netflix
2017 (69th)	The Crown	"Hyde Park Corner"	Rupert Gregson-Williams	Netflix
2017 (69th)	Planet Earth II	"Islands"	Jacob Shea and Jasha Klebe	BBC America
2017 (69th)	A Series of Unfortunate Events	"The Bad Beginning"	James Newton Howard	Netflix
2017 (69th)	Taboo	"Episode 1"	Max Richter	FX
2017 (69th)	Victoria	"Doll 123"	Martin Phipps, Ruth Barrett and Natalie Holt	PBS
2018 (70th)
2018 (70th)	Game of Thrones	"The Dragon and the Wolf"	Ramin Djawadi	HBO
2018 (70th)	Marvel's Jessica Jones	"AKA Playland"	Sean Callery	Netflix
2018 (70th)	Once Upon a Time	"Leaving Storybrooke"	Mark Isham, Cindy O'Connor and Michael Simon	ABC
2018 (70th)	SEAL Team	"Pattern of Life"	W. G. Snuffy Walden and A. Patrick Rose	CBS
2018 (70th)	Star Wars Rebels	"Family Reunion and Farewell"	Kevin Kiner	Disney XD
2018 (70th)	Westworld	"Akane No Mai"	Ramin Djawadi	HBO
2019 (71st)
2019 (71st)	Game of Thrones	"The Long Night"	Ramin Djawadi	HBO
2019 (71st)	Barry	"What?!"	David Wingo	HBO
2019 (71st)	The Handmaid's Tale	"The Word"	Adam Taylor	Hulu
2019 (71st)	House of Cards	"Chapter 73"	Jeff Beal	Netflix
2019 (71st)	This Is Us	"Songbird Road, Part 1"	Siddhartha Khosla	NBC

=== 2020s ===
Year	Program	Episode	Nominee(s)	Network
2020 (72nd)
2020 (72nd)	The Mandalorian	"Chapter 8: Redemption"	Ludwig Göransson	Disney+
2020 (72nd)	The Crown	"Aberfan"	Martin Phipps	Netflix
2020 (72nd)	Euphoria	"'03 Bonnie and Clyde"	Labrinth	HBO
2020 (72nd)	Ozark	"All In"	Danny Bensi and Saunder Jurriaans	Netflix
2020 (72nd)	Succession	"This Is Not for Tears"	Nicholas Britell	HBO
2021 (73rd)
2021 (73rd)	The Mandalorian	"Chapter 16: The Rescue"	Ludwig Göransson	Disney+
2021 (73rd)	Bridgerton	"Diamond of the First Water"	Kris Bowers	Netflix
2021 (73rd)	The Crown	"The Balmoral Test"	Martin Phipps	Netflix
2021 (73rd)	The Handmaid's Tale	"The Crossing"	Adam Taylor	Hulu
2021 (73rd)	Lovecraft Country	"Rewind 1921"	Laura Karpman and Raphael Saadiq	HBO
2021 (73rd)	This Is Us	"Birth Mother"	Siddhartha Khosla	NBC
2022 (74th)
2022 (74th)	Severance	"The We We Are"	Theodore Shapiro	Apple TV+
2022 (74th)	The Flight Attendant	"The Reykjavik Ice Sculpture Festival is Lovely This Time of Year"	Blake Neely	HBO Max
2022 (74th)	Loki	"Glorious Purpose"	Natalie Holt	Disney+
2022 (74th)	Only Murders in the Building	"The Boy from 6B"	Siddhartha Khosla	Hulu
2022 (74th)	Schmigadoon!	"Schmigadoon!"	Christopher Willis	Apple TV+
2022 (74th)	Succession	"Chiantishire"	Nicholas Britell	HBO
2023 (75th)
2023 (75th)	The White Lotus	"In the Sandbox"	Cristobal Tapia de Veer	HBO
2023 (75th)	Andor	"Rix Road"	Nicholas Britell	Disney+
2023 (75th)	The Last of Us	"Long, Long Time"	Gustavo Santaolalla	HBO
2023 (75th)	Succession	"Connor's Wedding"	Nicholas Britell	HBO
2023 (75th)	Wednesday	"Woe Is the Loneliest Number"	Danny Elfman and Chris Bacon	Netflix
2024 (76th)
2024 (76th)	Only Murders in the Building	"Sitzprobe"	Siddhartha Khosla	Hulu
2024 (76th)	The Crown	"Sleep, Dearie Sleep"	Martin Phipps	Netflix
2024 (76th)	Mr. & Mrs. Smith	"First Date"	David Fleming	Prime Video
2024 (76th)	Palm Royale	"Maxine Saves a Cat"	Jeff Toyne	Apple TV+
2024 (76th)	Shōgun	"Servants of Two Masters"	Atticus Ross, Leopold Ross and Nick Chuba	FX
2024 (76th)	Silo	"Freedom Day"	Atli Örvarsson	Apple TV+
2024 (76th)	Slow Horses	"Strange Games"	Daniel Pemberton and Toydrum	Apple TV+
2025 (77th)
2025 (77th)	Severance	"Cold Harbor"	Theodore Shapiro	Apple TV+
2025 (77th)	Andor	"Who Are You?"	Brandon Roberts	Disney+
2025 (77th)	Based on a True Story	"Relapse"	Sherri Chung	Peacock
2025 (77th)	Cobra Kai	"Blood in Blood Out"	Leo Birenberg and Zach Robinson	Netflix
2025 (77th)	The Studio	"The Missing Reel"	Antonio Sánchez	Apple TV+
2025 (77th)	The White Lotus	"Amor Fati"	Cristobal Tapia de Veer	HBO
2026 (78th)
2026 (78th)	Widow's Bay	"Our History"	David Fleming	Apple TV
2026 (78th)	A Knight of the Seven Kingdoms	"In the Name of the Mother"	Dan Romer	HBO
2026 (78th)	Palm Royale	"Maxine Drinks Martinis Now"	Jeff Toyne	Apple TV
2026 (78th)	Pluribus	"We Is Us"	Dave Porter	Apple TV
2026 (78th)	Slow Horses	"Missiles"	Daniel Pemberton and Toydrum	Apple TV
2026 (78th)	Spider-Noir	"Step Into My Office"	Kris Bowers and Michael Dean Parsons	MGM+ / Prime Video

== Total awards by network ==
- CBS – 12
- ABC – 7
- NBC – 6
- Fox – 3
- PBS – 3
- Syndicated – 3
- Discovery Channel – 2
- Disney+ – 2
- HBO – 2
- Netflix – 2
- UPN – 2
- The WB – 2
- Apple TV+ – 2
- Showtime – 1
- USA – 1

== Programs with multiple awards ==
3 awards

- 24

2 awards

- Beauty and the Beast
- Dallas (consecutive)
- Downton Abbey (consecutive)
- Game of Thrones (consecutive)
- Hawaii Five-O
- House of Cards
- Little House on the Prairie
- The Mandalorian (consecutive)
- Severance
- The Young Indiana Jones Chronicles (consecutive)

== Programs with multiple nominations ==
12 nominations

- The Simpsons

8 nominations

- 24

6 nominations

- Dallas

5 nominations

- Hawaii Five-O
- House of Cards
- Star Trek: The Next Generation
- Star Trek: Voyager
- The X-Files
- Xena: Warrior Princess

4 nominations

- The Crown
- Little House on the Prairie
- Lou Grant
- Moonlighting

3 nominations

- Beauty and the Beast
- Columbo
- Downton Abbey
- Family Guy
- Game of Thrones
- I Spy
- Lost
- Love, American Style
- Matlock
- Mission: Impossible
- Murder, She Wrote
- Run for Your Life
- SeaQuest DSV
- Succession
- The White Lotus (Note: Total includes The White Lotus's nomination for Outstanding Music Composition for a Limited or Anthology Series, Movie or Special.)
- The Young Indiana Jones Chronicles

2 nominations

- Andor
- Bonanza
- The Borgias
- Bronk
- CBS Playhouse
- Chef's Table
- The Days and Nights of Molly Dodd
- Dynasty
- Enterprise
- Ghost Whisperer
- Gunsmoke
- The Handmaid's Tale
- House
- JAG
- Knots Landing
- The Mandalorian
- Miami Vice
- Only Murders in the Building
- Palm Royale
- Penny Dreadful
- Rome
- Roots
- Severance
- Slow Horses
- St. Elsewhere
- 30 Rock
- This Is Us

== Composers with multiple awards ==
3 awards

- Bruce Broughton
- Sean Callery
- David Rose

2 awards

- Jeff Beal
- Don Davis
- John Debney
- Ramin Djawadi
- George Fenton
- Billy Goldenberg
- Ludwig Göransson
- Joseph LoDuca
- John Lunn
- Joel Rosenbaum
- Laurence Rosenthal
- Theodore Shapiro
- Morton Stevens

== Composers with multiple nominations ==
16 nominations

- Alf Clausen

10 nominations

- Sean Callery
- Patrick Williams

8 nominations

- Jeff Beal
- Dennis McCarthy
- David Rose

7 nominations

- Mark Snow

6 nominations

- Bruce Broughton
- Billy Goldenberg
- Joseph LoDuca
- Angela Morley
- Morton Stevens

5 nominations

- Ramin Djawadi
- Bruce Babcock
- Don Davis
- W. G. Snuffy Walden

4 nominations

- Cristobal Tapia de Veer
- Nicholas Britell
- Jay Chattaway
- Dick DeBenedictis
- Charles Fox
- Siddhartha Khosla
- Martin Phipps
- Pete Rugolo
- Lalo Schifrin
- Nan Schwartz

3 nominations

- Jon Ehrlich
- Michael Giacchino
- Earle Hagen
- John Lunn
- Joel Rosenbaum
- Laurence Rosenthal

2 nominations

- Chris Bacon
- Kris Bowers
- Steven Bramson
- Velton Ray Bunch
- John Cacavas
- John Debney
- Jason Derlatka
- Robert Duncan
- George Fenton
- David Fleming
- Gerald Fried
- Joel Goldsmith
- Ludwig Göransson
- Jan Hammer
- Natalie Holt
- Quincy Jones
- Ron Jones
- Fred Karlin
- Laura Karpman
- Abel Korzeniowski
- Trevor Morris
- Blake Neely
- Daniel Pemberton
- J. A. C. Redford
- Jeff Richmond
- Adam Taylor
- Duncan Thum
- Toydrum
- Jeff Toyne
- Jack Urbont
