= Fantastic Planet Revisited =

Studio album by DIN
- Released: July 2, 1996
- Genre: Techno; EBM
- Length: 63:06
- Label: Hypnotic
- Producer: Jean-Claude Cutz

DIN chronology
Decade of the Brain (1994)	Fantastic Planet Revisited (1996)

Fantastic Planet Revisited is the third studio album by DIN, released on July 2, 1996 by Hypnotic Records.

== Track listing ==
All music is composed by Jean-Claude Cutz

No.	Title	Length
1.	"Stab"	6:34
2.	"Travesty"	4:32
3.	"Fantastic Planet"	4:57
4.	"Stilettodisko"	5:26
5.	"The New Age"	5:10
6.	"I've Seen It Done"	4:17
7.	"Clown Suit"	4:02
8.	"Terroreyes"	4:37
9.	"Son of Ugly"	5:55
10.	"Blutung"	4:32
11.	"Bi-Minis Megamix"	7:01
12.	"Demented"	6:01

== Personnel ==
Adapted from the Fantastic Planet Revisited liner notes.

DIN

- Jean-Claude Cutz (as Din, Pupka Frey and Oliver Cutz) – organ, percussion, arrangements, producer

Additional performers

- Arthur Oskan – synthesizer

Production and design

- Gérard Bélanger – executive-producer
- Disco Monica – photography, art director
- Willy Idol – art director
- Rob Stuart – mastering, editing
- King Svenie – cover art, illustrations, design

== Release history ==
Region	Date	Label	Format	Catalog
United States	1996	Hypnotic	CD	CLP 9775
