= Orbiting Cathedrals =

Studio album by Pro>Tech
- Released: October 7, 1997
- Recorded: Cryogenic Studios, Vancouver
- Genre: Techno, drum and bass, ambient
- Length: 56:34
- Label: Dossier, Hypnotic

Orbiting Cathedrals is the only album by Pro>Tech, a side project of Canadian industrial musician Bill Leeb with the help of industrial musician Chris Peterson. The project was launched in 1997 in the wake of the release of the album [FLA]vour of the Weak from industrial band Front Line Assembly, which at the time consisted of Leeb and Peterson. Orbiting Cathedrals is supposed to be a musical twin of [FLA]vour of the Weak. The album was released through German label Dossier and re-released in 2000 by Hypnotic. Tracks from Orbiting Cathedrals also appeared on Cryogenic Studios and Cryogenic Studio, Vol. 2, compilation albums with songs from Front Line Assembly and related projects.

== Critical reception ==
Professional ratings
Review scores
Source	Rating
AllMusic	4/5 stars
Culture Shock	4/7
Ink 19	Favorable
Naked Truth	7/10

Orbiting Cathedrals was met mostly with positive reviews. However, Culture Shock in their mixed review called the album "an amalgam of the various styles of techno in 1996/7" and considered the album mostly "pretty unobstrusive, and therefore nothing all that interesting."

== Track listing ==
All tracks are written by Bill Leeb, except where noted.

No.	Title	Length
1.	"Pheromne"	10:29
2.	"Erotic Ontology"	8:15
3.	"Thread Four"	8:45
4.	"Walls of Ice"	5:41
5.	"Recalcitrant"	6:32
6.	"Eros"	6:45
7.	"Communication" (Written and composed by Leeb and Chris Peterson.)	4:24
8.	"Re-Thread" (Written and composed by Leeb and Peterson.)	7:43

== Personnel ==
- Bill Leeb – electronic instruments, mixing
- Chris Peterson – programming, additional sounds, mixing
- Carylann Loeppky – cover artwork
