= Actors (band) =

Canadian post-punk band

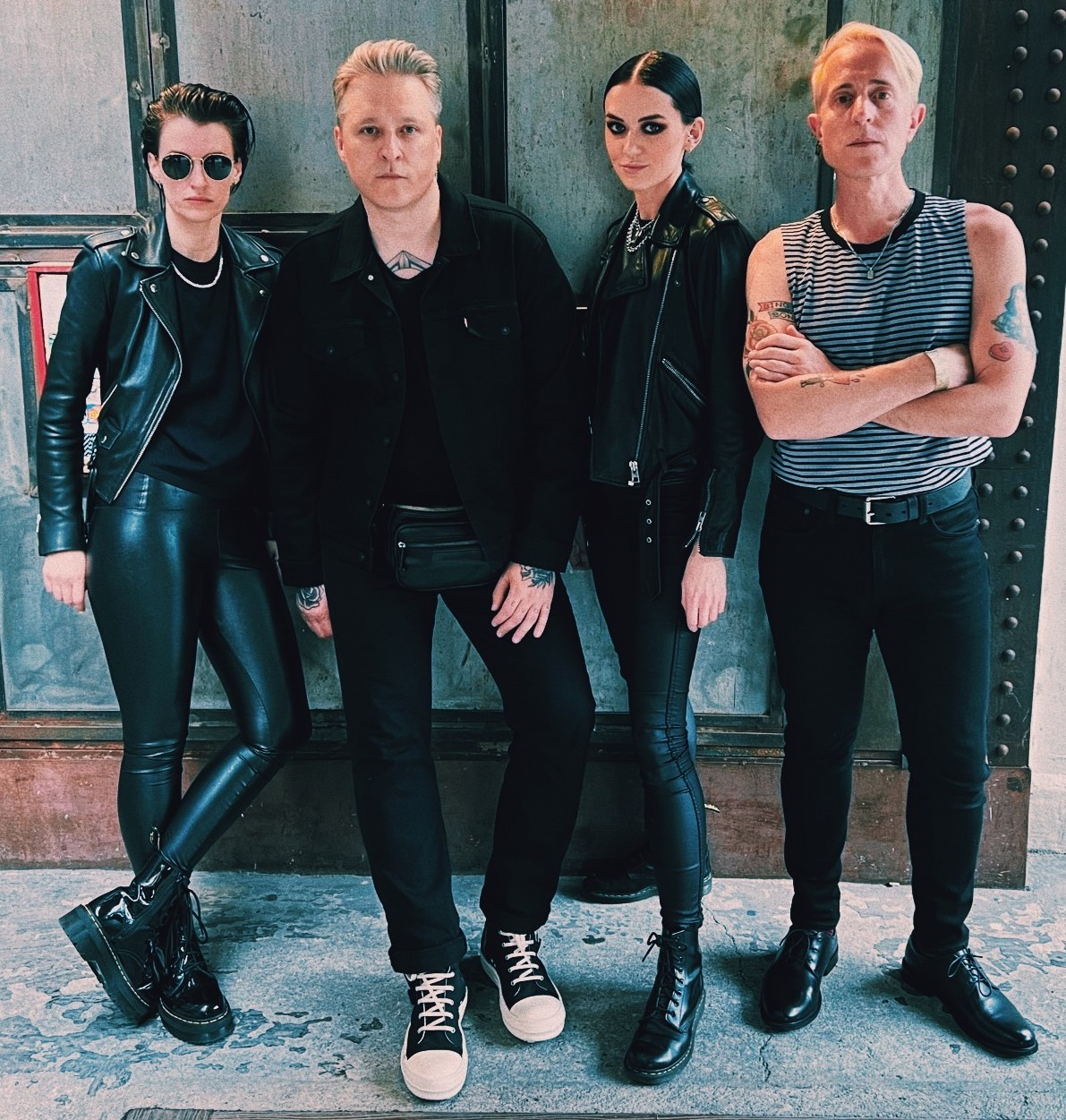
- Actors in Madrid, May 27, 2023, left to right: Shannon Hemmett, Jason Corbett, Kendall Wooding, Adam Fink

Background information
- Origin: Vancouver, British Columbia, Canada
- Genres: Post-punk, Dark wave
- Years active: 2012–present
- Labels: Northern Light Records; Artoffact
- Members: Jason Corbett; Adam Fink; Shannon Hemmett; Kendall Wooding
- Past members: Grant Francis Minor; Mark Crickmay; Jake Fox; Jahmeel Russell
- Website: actorstheband.com

Actors (stylized as ACTORS) are a Canadian post-punk band from Vancouver, British Columbia, formed in 2012. The band consists of founder Jason Corbett (vocals and guitar), Shannon Hemmett (keyboards and backing vocals), Kendall Wooding (bass and backing vocals), and Adam Fink (drums). Their debut album, It Will Come To You, was released in 2018, followed by their second album, Acts of Worship, in 2021.

== History ==
=== Early years (2012–2016) ===
While still working in the Vancouver restaurant industry as a server and manager, Jason Corbett began Actors in 2012. Though Actors was his first post-punk/dark wave musical project, Corbett was no stranger to the Vancouver music scene. He began playing guitar at 14 when his mother noticed him playing air guitar to Def Leppard's "Photograph" and asked if he wanted to learn how to play the real thing. Over the years, Corbett would go on to join and lead ten bands, five of which actually recorded and released music. Among those were rockabilly outfit The Saddlesores (the band which encouraged Corbett to try singing as opposed to only playing guitar), alternative rock group Speed to Kill, and indie rock band TV Heart Attack, his final band before starting Actors.

When asked about his varied genre musical background and the influence those bands had on his trajectory towards creating Actors, Corbett told online blog Alienated in Vancouver in 2021: "I had exhausted myself chasing what I thought would be “success." I started writing and producing music based on what I was really feeling and wanted to explore. That was the beginning of ACTORS. The music from my childhood just bubbled up to the surface. Roxy Music, Gary Numan, David Bowie, and Duran Duran all somehow influenced me on a subconscious level. At the end of the day though there's so many influences from over the years."

Shortly after forming Actors, Corbett initially recruited drummer Adam Fink for studio session work while the two played in TV Heart Attack together. Fink officially became part of Actors soon thereafter with the dissolution of TV Heart Attack in the summer of 2012. Actors grew into a quintet following the additions of Mark Crickmay (of PRIMARY and TV Heart Attack) on guitar, Grant Francis Minor (also in Girlfriends and Boyfriends, later in Schedule 1) on bass guitar, and Jake Fox (of Fake Shark and Blank Cinema) on keyboards. The fledgling band played their first show as part of the Vancouver Fashion Week's opening gala on September 18, 2012, at Club FIVESIXTY in Vancouver.

Following a visit to Hansa Studio in Berlin, where David Bowie recorded the Berlin Trilogy, Corbett was inspired to write and record the first eight Actors songs throughout 2012, including "Forever", "Post Traumatic Love (PTL)", and "Nightlife". On October 4, 2012, the first Actors single for Post Traumatic Love / Nightlife was released through local label Northern Light Records with the band playing a record release show at The Cobalt in Vancouver that night.

In June 2013, Actors contributed a new single "It Goes Away" for the Save on Meats Common Courtesy compilation album benefitting Kids Up Front Vancouver, an organization that provides disadvantaged kids across Canada with access to ticketed events like sports matches and concerts donated by members of the community. Corbett spent the remainder of the year working on new material and contributing remixes of songs to various local Vancouver bands.

On May 29, 2014, Actors released the new single "Jacknife" with the b-side "Flesh and Bone". Shortly thereafter on July 20, 2014, Corbett officially started his own recording studio, Jacknife Sound, taking its name from the recent Actors track. All future Actors recordings would be written, recorded, mixed, and mastered at the studio.

As Corbett continued to release new Actors singles and contribute remixes of tracks for other bands, the Actors lineup changed with Crickmay leaving the band to focus on his solo project, PRIMARY (Fox would take on playing both keyboards and additional guitars during future live shows). Additionally, Minor was asked to leave the band in favor of the addition of bassist Jahmeel Russell (of Red Vienna, KEN Mode, Kittens, among others). Russell had been hired for some bass session work for an album Corbett was producing at the time and the two hit things off quickly. Vancouver-based graphic designer and photographer Shannon Hemmett, whom Corbett had already been working with on a new electro-pop project called Leathers, rounded out the band's main lineup in 2016 after Corbett asked her to fill in on keyboards for a show that Fox was unable to attend. While Actors continued for almost a year as a quintet with both keyboard players, Corbett soon parted ways with Fox feeling that Hemmett's energy better suited the band.

2016 also saw Corbett get into the world of making music for TV and film as he began contributing to Crave's comedy show Letterkenny. Corbett would continue to serve as one of the show's occasional music composers through 2023. He would also go on to produce the original score to the 2017 comedy horror film, Dead Shack, directed by Peter Ricq.

=== Artoffact Records signing and It Will Come To You (2017–2019) ===
In early 2017, Actors self-released the Reanimated EP, a collection of their previously released singles that were remastered and made available on a physical medium (12" vinyl record) for the first time. Later in 2017, Actors played Terminus Festival in Calgary which led to a chance encounter with representatives from Toronto-based label Artoffact Records. Corbett had been approached by the label previously with a record deal, but turned it down over a combination of hesitation to work with a label that might take advantage of his work and feeling like he was already finding success with Actors by releasing singles regularly. Artoffact went on to sign Actors in late 2017.

Soon after joining Artoffact, Actors released their debut album, It Will Come To You, in March 2018. The band then embarked on their first tour covering the West Coast of the United States in March and April, culminating in a live taping session for KXLU 88.9FM's Part Time Punks radio show. Shortly thereafter, Actors set out on their first European tour which ended in their appearance at Wave-Gotik-Treffen that May. An appearance at the 20th anniversary of Infest followed in August with additional US tour dates throughout the fall around all three Cold Waves Festival dates. Actors also made appearances on Seattle's KEXP Morning Show with John Richards and JBTV in Chicago during this part of the tour.

In 2018, Actors became sponsored by Yamaha Canada. In particular, Corbett was using a Revstar RS502 SPB guitar while Russell played a BB734A MTB bass with an Ampeg PortaFlex PF350 amp. The band recorded a promotional video for Yamaha that was featured on the company's website.

Actors continued their rigorous tour in 2019, beginning with a headlining tour spanning mid-March to early-May of the US with new Artoffact labelmates Bootblacks. The band then returned to Europe in August and September of the same year. In all, Actors played approximately 140 shows in the 18-month span following the release of It Will Come To You.

=== Acts of Worship (2020–present) ===
After completing the touring cycle for Actors' debut album, Corbett turned his attention to producing and mixing the forthcoming Spectres album, Nostalgia, and finishing the Artoffact-debut album from Bootblacks, Thin Skies. With his production duties cleared, Corbett then focused on finishing the second album for Actors, which was initially slated for a late 2020 release. However, due to the COVID-19 pandemic, the album was delayed until 2021. To tide fans over until the album's release, a slew of new singles were released digitally, beginning with the new album's opening track "Love U More". Peter Ricq directed the music video for the single which follows a zombie portrayed by Bianca Roca from its suburban home to a local concert hall where the zombie finds the band already deceased and begins to play their instruments. The video ends with the zombie following a person back to their home and ultimately entering the home. The video received high acclaim and won the 2021 Music Video Leo Award. It was also around this time that Actors announced on their Facebook page Jahmeel Russell's departure from the band and introduced his replacement, Kendall Wooding. Wooding was originally recruited to join Shannon Hemmett's Leathers side project on guitars and backing vocals, but Corbett felt she would also be a welcome addition to the Actors lineup on bass.

Actors would release their second album, Acts of Worship, on October 1, 2021, through Artoffact Records; in a positive review, Ondarock observed references including OMD and Visage. The band were initially scheduled to tour North America in late 2021 in support of the new album, including a second appearance at Cold Waves Festival, but had to postpone their tour dates to Spring 2022 due to visa issues in the aftermath of the COVID-19 pandemic. Instead, the band toured North America in support of Acts of Worship from March through May 2022, ending with an appearance at Vancouver's Verboden Festival.

Just prior to starting their Spring 2022 tour, the lineup for the 10-year anniversary of Cold Waves Festival was announced with Actors scheduled to appear at all three dates again, making up their 2021 missed performance. Additional dates across the US were later added for September 2022 and a UK and Europe tour was announced for October and November 2022.

In early May 2022, Actors announced the reissue of their 2017 self-released EP, Reanimated. The reissue would feature the original EP's tracks plus a handful of remixes of the band's first single "Post Traumatic Love".

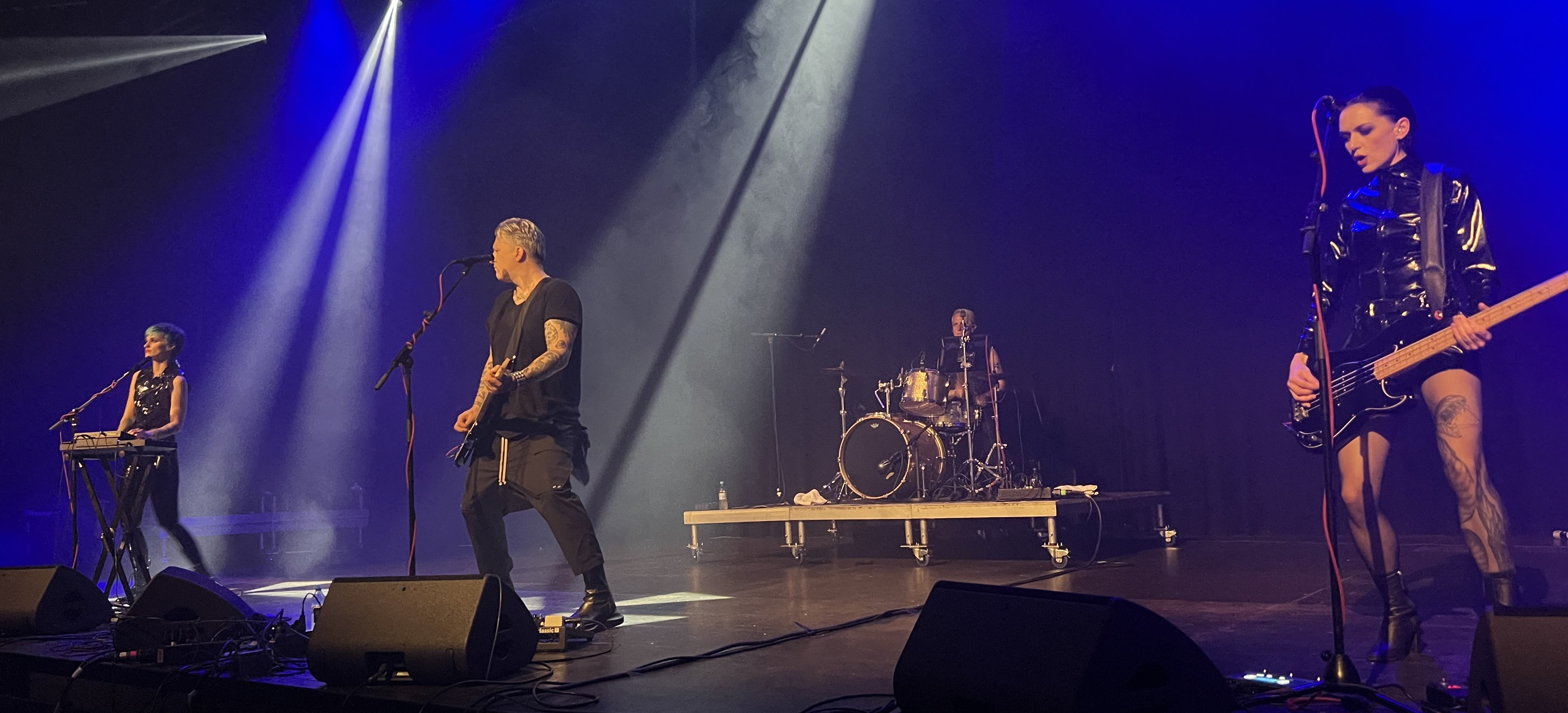
Actors live on July 30, 2023, headlining the indoor theater stage at Amphi Festival 2023

While on tour in the UK and Europe, Actors were announced as part of the inaugural lineup for VampireFreaks' new dark music and arts festival Dark Force Fest taking place in Parsippany, New Jersey, in April 2023. Shortly after this announcement, Jason Corbett became ill during the European part of the Actors 2022 tour, leading to show cancellations in Germany. After attempting to push through shows in France, the band made the decision to cancel the remaining tour dates via a Facebook post so Corbett could focus on recovering from the illness.

Makeup dates for the European tour were announced in early 2023 and included new appearances at the second Sons no Montijo Festival in Montijo, Portugal, the Castle Party Festival at Bolków Castle, Poland, the inaugural Death Disco Festival in Athens, Greece, and ending with Amphi Festival in Cologne, Germany. A brief US West Coast tour and appearance in Mexico City was also announced for November 2023.

Actors released their first post-Acts of Worship single, "In Real Life" on March 22, 2024. Tour dates for 2024 were also announced, starting with another appearance at Verboden Festival and culminating in a limited run of dates across the United States.

A second new single, "Dead Inside", was released on June 21, 2024. Drawing inspiration from Bauhaus, the song centers around an inverse of the drum line from "Bela Lugosi's Dead" while the music video is a direct homage to Bauhaus's video performance in The Hunger. Actors were also announced as the closing night headliner for Purple City Music Festival in Edmonton later that fall.

Later in summer 2024, both Jason Corbett and Kendall Wooding were endorsed by Seymour Duncan pickups. Wooding would also later become endorsed by Charvel.

Also that summer, Actors collaborated with Vancouver industrial musician Bill Leeb on two tracks for his forthcoming solo album Model Kollapse (later released in September via Metropolis Records). The first of those tracks, "Terror Forms", became the lead single for the album and included a music video that featured a mechanized and distorted Shannon Hemmett.

The band returned with their third new single, "Object of Desire", released on October 4, 2024. This track along with "Dead Inside" made their live debuts at the start of the Fall US Tour at (Le) Poisson Rouge in New York City.

2025 saw Actors return to Europe for a five week tour spanning the end of January through the beginning of March. Key dates included the tour opener and the band's first appearance in Bucharest, a live taping session and stage performance for Grauzone, the group's first Italian show ever in Turin, and sold out shows across Spain. After a brief break, the band played a handful of dates in Texas and Mexico City followed by the Pacific Northwest and ending with a small run of dates across Canada. Actors also provided local support for Refused during their Vancouver appearance on their farewell tour.

In the spring of 2025, Actors were announced as part of the lineup for the fourth annual Cruel World Festival taking place in May. The band played the Outsiders Stage alongside Garbage, Nick Cave and the Bad Seeds, and New Order.

Actors announced what would likely be their final major tour dates before taking a year off to focus on finishing their third album. Beginning with supporting The Damned on their Vancouver show in July, Actors would play a mostly Eastern United States tour in the fall with support from labelmates Leathers and Soft Vein. The tour would center around a return appearance at Cold Waves Festival in Chicago and Absolution Fest in Tampa.

On June 27, 2025, Modern English released Crazy Lovers (Remixes) which featured a remix of "Crazy Lovers" by Actors.

== Musical style ==
Actors' music has been associated with post-punk and numerous related genres, including dark wave, new wave, and synthpop. When asked about the sound of Actors, Corbett said in 2019: "We playfully call ourselves “post-post-punk" with influences ranging from early-‘80s pop music to contemporary darkwave music. Really, I just write what I want to and it comes out the way it sounds. We don't set out to sound like any one genre specifically."

In the studio, Corbett uses a range of guitars, basses, drums, synthesizers, effects pedals, drum machines, and VST plugins to craft Actors' unique sound. Some of these include the Roland TR-505, Roland Juno-60, and the Prophet-6. Live, Corbett typically uses a Fender Stratocaster or a modified Charvel Sean Long San Dimas Style 1, Wooding plays a Charvel Pro-Mod San Dimas PJ IV bass, Hemmett uses a Roland Jupiter Xm, and Fink uses a Roland SPD-SX Pro as part of his drum setup.

== Discography ==
Studio albums

- It Will Come to You (2018)
- Acts of Worship (2021)
- Our Love Will Live Forever (2026)

EPs

- Reanimated (2017)
- Part Time Punks Session (2018)

Singles

- Post Traumatic Love / Nightlife (2012)
- It Goes Away (2013)
- Jacknife / Flesh And Bone (2014)
- Like U Want 2 / How Deep Is The Hole (2014)
- XYX / Forever (2015)
- Let It Grow (2015)
- Hit to the Head (2016)
- Bury Me / Crosses (2016)
- One Hundred Years (2016), The Cure cover
- L'Appel Du Vide / Crystal (2017)
- Mining For Heart (2019), The Sound cover
- Love U More (2020)
- Cold Eyes (2021)
- Only Lonely (2021)
- Like Suicide (2021)
- Strangers (2021)
- Boys Keep Swinging (2022) with Bootblacks feat. Leathers, David Bowie cover
- In Real Life (2024)
- Dead Inside (2024)
- Object of Desire (2024)
