= Ambient Time Travellers =

Compilation album by Various artists
- Released: November 14, 1995
- Genres: Ambient; electronic
- Length: 75:42
- Label: Hypnotic

Ambient Time Travellers is a various artists compilation album released on November 14, 1995, by Hypnotic Records.

== Reception ==
Sonic Boom said "by placing a variety of ambient artists together you begin to understand the subtle differences within the ambient genre and are slowly able to identify each artist on its own, separate from entirety of one musical work, often a very difficult feat within the ambient realm of music."

== Track listing ==
No.	Title	Writer(s)	Artist	Length
1.	"Soul Herder"	Paul Fox; Tommy Greñas; Len Del Rio; Doran Shelley	Anubian Lights	8:46
2.	"Six"	Zip Campisi	7	5:51
3.	"Precambrian Shuffle"	Fox; Greñas	The Brain	7:06
4.	"Seeing Strange Lights"	Helios Creed	Dark Matter	7:06
5.	"Sea of Steps" (Dreaming Waters Mix)	Don Falcone	Spaceship Eyes	7:45
6.	"Mental Atmospheres"	Len Del Rio	Zero Gravity	9:27
7.	"Bizarre Planet"	Alfred Gregl; Torben Schmidt	Xylon	8:29
8.	"Uduism"	Victor Wulf	Dilate	5:01
9.	"Punctual Voices"	Ken Duke; Kneu	Giez	5:46
10.	"Live Latitude"	Dean De Benedictis	Surface 10	10:25

== Personnel ==
Adapted from the Ambient Time Travellers liner notes.

== Release history ==
Region	Date	Label	Format	Catalog
United States	1996	Hypnotic	CD	CLEO 96492
