= Ultimate Space Rock =

Compilation album by Various artists
- Released: June 8, 1999
- Recorded: 1993
- Genre: Electronic; ambient
- Length: 262:33
- Label: Cleopatra
- Producer: Len del Rio

Ultimate Space Rock is a various artists compilation album released on June 8, 1999 by Cleopatra Records.

== Reception ==
Professional ratings
Review scores
Source	Rating
Allmusic	1.5/5 stars

AllMusic gave the collection a rating of one and a half out of five possible stars and said "as a comprehensive document of this underground genre, Ultimate Space Rock's title says it all."

== Track listing ==
Disc one
No.	Title	Artist	Length
1.	"Landing on Cydonia"	Farflung	5:18
2.	"Vision of Infinity"	Farflung	4:25
3.	"Icarus/Daedalus"	Farflung	3:49
4.	"The Way the Sky Is"	Farflung	5:38
5.	"Future Days"	Farflung	3:22
6.	"See You up There"	Farflung	7:17
7.	"The Raven That Ate the Moon"	Farflung	4:58
8.	"Mother Orbis"	Farflung	5:21

Disc two
No.	Title	Artist	Length
1.	"INTRO: 7 - 2 - 47> Roswell> New Mexico"		3:10
2.	"Explaining the Unexplained"	Pressurehed	3:10
3.	"Guiding Ray"	Yamo	7:34
4.	"Earth Calling"	Hawkwind	2:59
5.	"Natural Forces"	Synæsthesia	10:01
6.	"UFO"	Guru Guru	10:27
7.	"Nebula"	Brainticket	4:47
8.	"See You Up There"	Farflung	4:19
9.	"Shapeless Friend"	Surface 10	8:03
10.	"Celestial Hysteria"	Melting Euphoria	6:13
11.	"Shapeshifter"	Dilate	15:14
12.	"OUTRO: 7 - 4 - 47> The Truth"		1:38

Disc three
No.	Title	Artist	Length
1.	"INTRO: 8 - ? - 47> Fortworth> Airbase> TX"		1:50
2.	"Sunrise in the Third System"	Tangerine Dream	4:22
3.	"Artificial Human"	Chrome	5:44
4.	"A Sprinkling of Clouds" (System 7 Remix)	Gong	9:57
5.	"Sci-Fi Memento"	Kraftwelt	5:50
6.	"Surrounded By the Stars"	Amon Düül II	7:42
7.	"Dimensions Unmeasurable"	The Brain	11:09
8.	"Spiral Galaxy 28948"	Nik Turner	4:50
9.	"The Forge of Vulcan"	Spiral Realms	6:18
10.	"Grid Coordinate-Vorp One"	Anubian Lights	9:36
11.	"Longing for Daydreams"	Holger Czukay	5:22
12.	"OUTRO: 9 - 6 - 54> The Future"		1:52

Disc four
No.	Title	Artist	Length
1.	"Sudden Vertigo (Intro)"	Pressurehed	1:50
2.	"Red Delta"	Pressurehed	4:25
3.	"Dead Air"	Pressurehed	5:44
4.	"God's House"	Pressurehed	9:57
5.	"Shockneck"	Pressurehed	5:50
6.	"The Right Stuff"	Pressurehed	7:42
7.	"Majestic 12"	Pressurehed	11:09
8.	"Man in Static"	Pressurehed	4:50
9.	"Time Slip"	Pressurehed	6:18
10.	"Conscious Control"	Pressurehed	9:36
11.	"Wet Engines"	Pressurehed	5:22
12.	"Slo Blo"	Pressurehed	1:52

== Personnel ==
Adapted from the Ultimate Space Rock liner notes.

- Tom Grimley – engineering
- Len del Rio – production

== Release history ==
Region	Date	Label	Format	Catalog
United States	1999	Cleopatra	CD	579
