= In to the Mix III =

Compilation album by Various artists
- Released: October 19, 1999
- Genre: Electronic; techno; trance
- Length: 72:56
- Label: Hypnotic

Various artists chronology
| In to the Mix II (1998) | In to the Mix III (1999) |

In to the Mix III is a various artists compilation album released in October 19, 1999 by Hypnotic Records.

== Track listing ==
Disc one
| No. | Title | Artist | Length |
|---|---|---|---|
| 1. | "Velocity" (Rabbit in the Moon Remix) | Velocity | 9:32 |
| 2. | "Mr. Brown" (Electric Skychurch Remix) | Bob Marley | 4:58 |
| 3. | "Ballroom Blitz" (Astralasia Remix) | The Sweet | 4:37 |
| 4. | "Mouth Organ" (Chemical Brothers Mix) | Deeper Throat | 5:27 |
| 5. | "Ring My Bell" (Funkstar de Luxe Remix) | Miranda | 4:58 |
| 6. | "Walking in L.A." (KMFDM Remix) | Missing Persons | 4:48 |
| 7. | "Infra Stellar" (Remix) | Delerium | 8:17 |
| 8. | "Sugar Sugar" (Pistel Remix) | The Archies | 4:52 |
| 9. | "X-Beats" (Orbital Remix) | Pressure of Speech | 4:32 |
| 10. | "Contact" (Remix) | Equinox | 7:43 |
| 11. | "I Ran" (Die Krupps Remix) | A Flock of Seagulls | 3:45 |
| 12. | "The Metro" (Sigue Sigue Sputnik Remix) | Berlin | 4:28 |

Disc two
| No. | Title | Artist | Length |
|---|---|---|---|
| 1. | "Mental Atmosphere" | DJ Akira | 5:36 |
| 2. | "Liquid Loop" | Aqualite | 6:36 |
| 3. | "Drug Alert" | O-Zone | 5:54 |
| 4. | "Greenious" | Color Box | 9:57 |
| 5. | "Tunnel Floatation" | Bypass Unit | 5:55 |
| 6. | "The Second Room (A-Trip)" | X-Dream | 9:14 |
| 7. | "And Bits" | Atomic Beats | 6:08 |
| 8. | "Seed" | Silverbeam | 7:42 |
| 9. | "Pan Pot Jungle" | Hypercube | 8:30 |
| 10. | "Octagon" | Dilate | 7:46 |

== Personnel ==
Adapted from the In to the Mix III liner notes.

- Eunah Lee – cover art, illustrations, design

== Release history ==
| Region | Date | Label | Format | Catalog |
|---|---|---|---|---|
| United States | 1999 | Hypnotic | CD | CLP 0730 |
