= Area 51: The Roswell Incident =

1997 compilation album by various artists

Compilation album by Various artists
- Released: November 18, 1997
- Genres: Ambient; electronic
- Length: 152:34
- Label: Purple Pyramid

Area 51: The Roswell Incident is a various artists compilation album released on November 18, 1997 by Purple Pyramid Records.

== Reception ==
Professional ratings
Review scores
Source	Rating
Allmusic	4/5 stars

AllMusic awarded Area 51: The Roswell Incident four out of five stars and commended the collection for "hitting many of the genre's most seminal bands, as well as several newer ambient acts, over two budget-priced discs."

== Track listing ==
Disc one: Crash Landing
No.	Title	Artist	Length
1.	"INTRO: 7 - 2 - 47> Roswell> New Mexico"		3:10
2.	"Explaining the Unexplained"	Pressurehed	3:10
3.	"Guiding Ray"	Yamo	7:34
4.	"Earth Calling"	Hawkwind	2:59
5.	"Natural Forces"	Synæsthesia	10:01
6.	"UFO"	Guru Guru	10:27
7.	"Nebula"	Brainticket	4:47
8.	"See You Up There"	Farflung	4:19
9.	"Shapeless Friend"	Surface 10	8:03
10.	"Celestial Hysteria"	Melting Euphoria	6:13
11.	"Shapeshifter"	Dilate	15:14
12.	"OUTRO: 7 - 4 - 47> The Truth"		1:38

Disc two: Alien Autopsy
No.	Title	Artist	Length
1.	"INTRO: 8 - ? - 47> Fortworth> Airbase> TX"		1:50
2.	"Sunrise in the Third System"	Tangerine Dream	4:22
3.	"Artificial Human"	Chrome	5:44
4.	"A Sprinkling of Clouds" (System 7 Remix)	Gong	9:57
5.	"Sci-Fi Memento"	Kraftwelt	5:50
6.	"Surrounded By the Stars"	Amon Düül II	7:42
7.	"Dimensions Unmeasurable"	The Brain	11:09
8.	"Spiral Galaxy 28948"	Nik Turner	4:50
9.	"The Forge of Vulcan"	Spiral Realms	6:18
10.	"Grid Coordinate-Vorp One"	Anubian Lights	9:36
11.	"Longing for Daydreams"	Holger Czukay	5:22
12.	"OUTRO: 9 - 6 - 54> The Future"		1:52

== Personnel ==
Adapted from the Area 51: The Roswell Incident liner notes.

== Release history ==
Region	Date	Label	Format	Catalog
United States	1997	Purple Pyramid	CD	CLP 0172
