= Cryogenic Studios =

1998 Canadian compilation album

Compilation album by Front Line Assembly, Equinox, Delerium, Pro>Tech and Synæsthesia
- Released: August 11, 1998
- Recorded: Cryogenic Studio, Vancouver, B.C., Hyposonic Studio
- Genres: Electro-industrial, electronic, ambient house, drum and bass, big beat, ambient
- Length: 71:15
- Labels: Cleopatra, Zoth Ommog
- Producers: Bill Leeb, Chris Peterson, Rhys Fulber, Michael Balch

Front Line Assembly chronology
| [FLA]vour of the Weak (1997) | Cryogenic Studios (1998) | Re-Wind (1998) |

Delerium chronology
| Karma (1997) | Cryogenic Studios (1998) | Cryogenic Studio, Vol. 2 (2000) |

Professional ratings
Review scores
| Source | Rating |
|---|---|
| AllMusic | 2.5/5 stars |
| Ink 19 | Favorable |
| Sonic Boom Magazine | Favorable |

Cryogenic Studios is a compilation album that contains songs from several of Canadian electronic musician Bill Leeb's projects including Front Line Assembly, Equinox, Delerium, Pro>Tech, and Synæsthesia. It was released by Cleopatra in 1998. The album title refers to the name of Cryogenic Studio in Vancouver that serves as headquarters studio for Front Line Assembly and related side projects. The Zoth Ommog release for the European market came with a different artwork. All tracks except for "Infra Stellar (Remix)" were re-released in 2005 by Cleopatra on the compilation album The Best of Cryogenic Studio.

== Track listing ==
All tracks are written by Bill Leeb and Chris Peterson, except where noted.

| No. | Title | Artist | Length |
|---|---|---|---|
| 1. | "Contact (Remix)" | Equinox | 7:38 |
| 2. | "Nova Man (Remix)" | Equinox | 7:46 |
| 3. | "Equilibrium" | Front Line Assembly | 7:04 |
| 4. | "Transmutation" (Written by Bill Leeb and Michael Balch) | Front Line Assembly | 4:53 |
| 5. | "Infra Stellar (Remix)" (Written by Bill Leeb and Rhys Fulber) | Delerium | 8:18 |
| 6. | "Desert (Remix)" (Written by Bill Leeb and Rhys Fulber) | Delerium | 10:26 |
| 7. | "Thread-Dead (Remix)" | Pro>Tech | 8:41 |
| 8. | "Erotic Onthology (Remix)" | Pro>Tech | 7:14 |
| 9. | "The Flood" | Synæsthesia | 9:15 |

"Equilibrium" and "The Flood" are previously unreleased.

== Personnel ==
=== Front Line Assembly ===
- Bill Leeb – production, mixing (2–9)
- Chris Peterson – production (1–3, 7–9), mixing (2, 3, 7–9)
- Rhys Fulber – production (5, 6), mixing (5, 6)
- Michael Balch – production (4), mixing (4)

=== Technical personnel ===
- Greg Reely – mixing (1)
- Brian Gardner – mastering
- Carylann Loeppky – cover
