= Cryogenic Studio, Vol. 2 =

2000 compilation album by Front Line Assembly

Compilation album by Front Line Assembly, Noise Unit, Delerium, Pro>Tech, Equinox and Synæsthesia
- Released: November 14, 2000
- Recorded: Cryogenic Studio, Vancouver, B.C.
- Genres: Electro-industrial, electronic, ambient house, drum and bass, big beat, ambient, EBM
- Length: 125:33
- Label: Cleopatra

Front Line Assembly chronology
Implode (1999)	Cryogenic Studio, Vol. 2 (2000)	Epitaph (2001)

Delerium chronology
Karma (1997)	Cryogenic Studio, Vol. 2 (2000)	Poem (2000)

Professional ratings
Review scores
Source	Rating
AllMusic	2/5 stars

Cryogenic Studio, Vol. 2 is a compilation album, released in 2000, and the follow-up to the 1998 album Cryogenic Studios. It is composed from songs of electronic music bands Front Line Assembly, Noise Unit, Delerium, Pro>Tech, Equinox, and Synæsthesia, all of which are projects of Canadian electronic musician Bill Leeb. The album title refers to the name of Cryogenic Studio in Vancouver that serves as headquarters studio for Front Line Assembly and related side projects. All tracks except "Biosphere", "Eros", "Door to the Otherside", "Miracle", "Inner Chaos", and "Re-Thread" were re-released in 2005 by Cleopatra on the compilation album The Best of Cryogenic Studio, together with most of the tracks from previous compilation album Cryogenic Studios.

The back cover shows several errors. The sixth song on disc one is called "Door to the Otherside" but only "Otherside" is visible. The ninth track on disc two is falsely labeled "Turmoil" and the track's length is not correct. Also, track the number of the bands does not match the track number of the songs.

== Track listing ==
Disc 1
No.	Title	Writer(s)	Artist	Length
1.	"Paradise"	Bill Leeb, Rhys Fulber	Noise Unit	8:38
2.	"Biosphere"	Leeb, Fulber	Noise Unit	9:33
3.	"Amnesia"	Leeb, Chris Peterson	Delerium	9:10
4.	"Eros"	Leeb, Peterson	Pro>Tech	6:47
5.	"Phenomena"	Leeb, Peterson	Equinox	5:45
6.	"Door to the Otherside"	Leeb	Synæsthesia	11:14
7.	"The Drain"	Leeb, Fulber	Noise Unit	6:43
8.	"Amorphous"	Leeb, Peterson	Front Line Assembly	4:50

Disc 2
No.	Title	Writer(s)	Artist	Length
1.	"Miracle"	Leeb, Fulber	Noise Unit	6:42
2.	"Inner Chaos"	Leeb, Fulber	Noise Unit	7:54
3.	"Ambience"	Leeb, Peterson	Delerium	4:48
4.	"Electronic Dream"	Leeb, Peterson	Equinox	8:58
5.	"Re-Thread"	Leeb, Peterson	Pro>Tech	7:40
6.	"Floatation"	Leeb	Synæsthesia	8:36
7.	"Alle gegen alle"	Leeb, Fulber	Noise Unit	4:32
8.	"Penance"	Leeb, Fulber	Noise Unit	6:03
9.	"Mutate"	Leeb, Michael Balch	Front Line Assembly	5:41

"Amnesia", "Amorphous", and "Ambience" are previously unreleased.

== Personnel ==
=== Front Line Assembly ===
- Bill Leeb
- Chris Peterson
- Rhys Fulber
- Michael Balch

=== Technical personnel ===
- Carylann Loeppky – cover art
