= Decade of the Brain (album) =

Studio album by DIN
- Released: January 5, 1994
- Recorded: 1993 – 1994
- Studios: Laurel Studios (Jupiter Sound) (Toronto, Ontario)
- Genres: Techno; EBM
- Length: 50:41
- Label: DOVe
- Producers: Jean-Claude Cutz; David Newfeld

DIN chronology
Water Sports (1993)	Decade of the Brain (1994)	Fantastic Planet Revisited (1996)

Decade of the Brain is the second studio album by DIN, released on January 5, 1994, by DOVe.

== Reception ==
Aiding & Abetting wrote a mixed to negative review of Decade of the Brain, saying "there is a pleasant texture to the music, and you'll never get to the center of it."

== Track listing ==
All music is composed by Jean-Claude Cutz.

No.	Title	Length
1.	"Isoceles"	4:32
2.	"Orlando"	5:59
3.	"Space Jelly"	7:16
4.	"Bi-Minis"	3:22
5.	"Submission"	6:16
6.	"Ammonia D"	5:32
7.	"Watersports"	5:02
8.	"Melonball"	4:36
9.	"2000 Flushes"	8:06

== Personnel ==
Adapted from the Decade of the Brain liner notes.

DIN

- Jean-Claude Cutz (as Din and Pupka Frey) – vocoder, production

Additional performers

- David Newfeld – acoustic guitar, production

Production and design

- Gérard Bélanger – executive-producer
- Heiki Sillaste – cover art, illustrations, design
- Monika Szwyrlo – photography

== Release history ==
Region	Date	Label	Format	Catalog
Canada	1992	DOVe	CD	DOVe 244
United States	1992	Cleopatra	CD	CLP 9489
