= Space Box: 1970 & Beyond (Space, Krautrock & Acid Trips) =

Compilation album by Various artists
- Released: August 20, 1996
- Genres: ambient; electronic
- Length: 239:51
- Label: Cleopatra

Space Box: 1970 & Beyond (Space, Krautrock & Acid Trips) is a various artists compilation album released on August 20, 1996 by Cleopatra Records.

== Reception ==
Professional ratings
Review scores
Source	Rating
Allmusic	3/5 stars

AllMusic gave Space Box: 1970 & Beyond (Space, Krautrock & Acid Trips) three out of five stars and said the album "experimental music that is oddly limited, working the same vibe, if not the same sound." The critic went on to say "even though the set is well compiled and contains some fine songs (Faust and Gong sound particularly good), there's no denying that there is a limited audience for this, even among prog-rock fans."

== Track listing ==
Disc one
No.	Title	Writer(s)	Artist	Length
1.	"Valium 10" (12" Version)	Dave Brock; Harvey Bainbridge	Hawkwind	7:52
2.	"Slo Blo"	Paul Fox; Tommy Grenas; Doran Shelley; Len Del Rio	Pressurehed	8:06
3.	"Wolf City"	Tommy Grenas; Lothar Meid; John Weinzierl	Amon Düül II	3:20
4.	"Mominous"	Ron Geesin	Ron Geesin	1:27
5.	"Boots of Ascension"	F/i	F/i	7:58
6.	"Apropos Cluster"	Dieter Moebius; Hans-Joachim Roedelius	Cluster	8:46
7.	"Brainticket"	Architectural Metaphor	Architectural Metaphor	7:40
8.	"Gonwash Indelible"	Daevid Allen	Gong	5:48
9.	"Burning Sky"	Steven Wilson	Porcupine Tree	11:35
10.	"Third From the Sun"	Helios Creed; Damon Edge	Chrome	4:42
11.	"10 Seconds of Forever"	Robert Calvert	Nik Turner	3:15
12.	"International Sponge"	Alien Planetscapes	Alien Planetscapes	6:11

Disc two
No.	Title	Artist	Length
1.	"UFO"	Guru Guru	10:23
2.	"In Aquarian Dream"	Melting Euphoria	6:17
3.	"Electric Dimension" (Zero Gravity Mix)	Kraftwelt	6:09
4.	"Past Zero Time"	Dark Matter	12:14
5.	"Sehr Kosmisch"	Harmonia	10:56
6.	"The Alien Nation" (Space Mix)	Darxstar	7:21
7.	"Time Center"	Michael Moorcock's Deep Fix	4:35
8.	"Vision of Infinity" (7" Version)	Farflung	4:42
9.	"Number 6"	Brainstorm	5:50
10.	"Contrapuntal Interstellar Radars"	Conrad Schnitzler	3:32
11.	"Time Of..."	Hawklords	4:00

Disc three
No.	Title	Artist	Length
1.	"Devoted Bone Dance"	Faust	11:51
2.	"Leaving the Body"	Helios Creed	4:31
3.	"Ich Mache Einen Spiegel - Dream Part 4"	Popol Vuh	8:42
4.	"12-24-2011"	Anubian Lights	4:31
5.	"Tribal Elders"	Nick Riff	4:55
6.	"The Changing"	Harvey Bainbridge	3:26
7.	"Interferon"	Zero Gravity	3:34
8.	"Tangerine Sky"	Dilate	5:22
9.	"21:51" (Edit Version)	Kluster	5:59
10.	"Took Scorpius" (Deep Space Version)	Steve Peregrin	4:08
11.	"Vortex in My Cortex"	The Brain	T5:53
12.	"Cysyrgy"	Spiral Realms	5:51
13.	"Gamma Days"	Surface 10	8:04

== Personnel ==
Adapted from the Space Box: 1970 & Beyond (Space, Krautrock & Acid Trips) liner notes.

- Dave Thompson – liner notes
- Eunah Lee – design

== Release history ==
Region	Date	Label	Format	Catalog
United States	1996	Cleopatra	CD	CLP 9772
