= Holon (Equinox album) =

Studio album by Equinox
- Released: August 4, 1998
- Recorded: Cryogenic Studio, Vancouver
- Genre: Electro-industrial, drum and bass
- Length: 66:18
- Label: Hypnotic, Zoth Ommog
- Producer: Bill Leeb, Chris Peterson

Professional ratings
Review scores
Source	Rating
Allmusic	3/5 stars

Holon is the only album by electro-industrial and drum and bass band Equinox, released in 1998 by Hypnotic. Equinox was a side project of Canadian industrial musicians Bill Leeb and Chris Peterson of Canadian industrial band Front Line Assembly.

The album spawned the vinyl-only single "Contact", including a remix of the title track and the album version of "Phenomena". Remixes of tracks from Holon appeared on the compilation Cryogenic Studios and original tracks from the album appeared on Cryogenic Studio, Vol. 2, both of which are collections of tracks from Front Line Assembly and related projects.

== Track listing ==
No.	Title	Length
1.	"Contact"	7:38
2.	"Nova Man"	7:49
3.	"Janus Effect"	6:55
4.	"Phenomena"	5:45
5.	"Binary Star"	7:12
6.	"Funky Ass"	6:12
7.	"Electronic Dreams"	8:58
8.	"Remember Today"	7:11
9.	"Horizon"	8:38
