= This Is Space: The Space Daze Trilogy =

Compilation album by Various artists
- Released: April 29, 1997
- Genre: Psychedelic rock; electronic; ambient
- Length: 289:49
- Label: Cleopatra

This Is Space: The Space Daze Trilogy is a various artists compilation album released on April 29, 1997 by Cleopatra Records.

== Reception ==
Professional ratings
Review scores
Source	Rating
Allmusic	4/5 stars

AllMusic gave This Is Space four and out of five stars, calling it "a worthy collection of mostly beatless recordings throughout the ages" and "a surprisingly solid collection of space recordings from the 1970s, '80s and '90s, with Kraftwerk, Tangerine Dream, Eno, Gong, Klaus Schulze, Fripp & Eno, Roxy Music, David Bowie and Hawkwind representing the first onset of ambience."

== Track listing ==
Disc one
No.	Title	Artist	Length
1.	"Spacelab"	Kraftwerk	5:54
2.	"A Star Too Far (Lullaby For Syd Barrett)"	Psychic TV	7:43
3.	"Adjust Me"	Hawkwind	5:45
4.	"Blue Room" (Radio Edit)	The Orb	4:07
5.	"The Point of No Return"	Helios Creed	4:28
6.	"Evolution" (Live)	The Legendary Pink Dots	7:58
7.	"To the Other Side of Sky"	Gong	7:44
8.	"Dark Matter"	Delerium	7:30
9.	"Sploosh!"	Ozric Tentacles	6:24
10.	"Mrs. Fiend Goes To Outer Space"	Alien Sex Fiend	9:08
11.	"Elements"	Spiral Realms	6:55

Disc two
No.	Title	Artist	Length
1.	"Here Come The Warm Jets"	Brian Eno	4:06
2.	"Silver Bird/Mastodon"	Pressurehed	7:47
3.	"Lanky"	Syd Barrett	5:30
4.	"NASA Arab"	Coil	11:00
5.	"Wie Der Wind Am Ende Einer Strasse"	Amon Düül II	5:44
6.	"Slo Blo/God Rock" (Live)	Nik Turner	7:46
7.	"2,000 Flushes"	DIN	8:14
8.	"Movements of a Visionary"	Tangerine Dream	7:54
9.	"Rain" (19.5 Mix)	Sky Cries Mary	8:27
10.	"Eternity"	Clock DVA	4:33

Disc three
No.	Title	Artist	Length
1.	"Spineless Jelly"	The Future Sound of London	4:47
2.	"Wind of Change"	Hawkwind	4:33
3.	"Out of The Blue"	Roxy Music	4:45
4.	"Destiny"	Anubian Lights	6:22
5.	"Wahnfried 1883"	Klaus Schulze	10:51
6.	"All Saints"	David Bowie	3:36
7.	"Venusian Skyline"	Melting Euphoria	4:47
8.	"The Last Lagoon"	William Orbit	4:09
9.	"A Trip to G9"	Spiral Realms	6:50
10.	"Space Does Not Care"	Zero Gravity	2:29
11.	"Antenna"	Kraftwerk	3:44
12.	"#9"	Aphex Twin	7:01
13.	"Wind on Water"	Fripp & Eno	5:18
14.	"Oblivium"	Dilate	4:11

== Personnel ==
Adapted from the This Is Space: The Space Daze Trilogy liner notes.

- Dave Thompson – liner notes
- Eunah Lee – design

== Release history ==
Region	Date	Label	Format	Catalog
United States	1996	Cleopatra	CD	CLP 9772
