= Fateless =

Fateless may refer to:

- Fatelessness or Fateless, a 1975 novel by Imre Kertész
- Fateless (film), a 2005 Hungarian film, based on the novel
- Fateless (album), a 2017 album by Coldrain
- Fateless Records, a Los Angeles, California-based independent record label
