= Space Daze 2000: A Mind Journey of Electronic Ambient Space Rock =

Compilation album by Various artists
- Released: February 20, 1996
- Genre: Space rock; ambient
- Length: 73:30
- Label: Cleopatra

Space Daze 2000: A Mind Journey of Electronic Ambient Space Rock is a various artists compilation album released on February 20, 1996 by Cleopatra Records.

== Reception ==
Professional ratings
Review scores
Source	Rating
Allmusic	4.5/5 stars

AllMusic critic Stephen Thomas Erlewine awarded Space Daze 2000 four and a half out of five stars and called the collection "groundbreaking" and "an excellent sampling of ambient music."

== Track listing ==
No.	Title	Artist	Length
1.	"Spineless Jelly"	The Future Sound of London	4:47
2.	"Wind of Change"	Hawkwind	4:34
3.	"Out of the Blue"	Roxy Music	4:45
4.	"Anubian Light Destiny"	Anubian Lights	6:22
5.	"Wahnfried 1883"	Klaus Schulze	10:51
6.	"All Saints"	David Bowie	3:36
7.	"Venusian Skyline"	Melting Euphoria	4:48
8.	"The Last Lagoon"	William Orbit	4:09
9.	"A Trip to G9"	Spiral Realms	6:51
10.	"Space Does Not Care"	Zero Gravity	2:30
11.	"Antenna"	Kraftwerk	3:44
12.	"#9"	Aphex Twin	7:02
13.	"Wind on Water"	Fripp & Eno	5:19
14.	"Oblivium"	Dilate	4:12

== Personnel ==
Adapted from the Space Daze 2000: A Mind Journey of Electronic Ambient Space Rock liner notes.

- Carl Edwards – design
- Judson Leach – mastering

== Release history ==
Region	Date	Label	Format	Catalog
United States	1996	Cleopatra	CD	CLEO 1844
