= Machine Vision (EP) =

EP by Bill Leeb
- Released: August 22, 2025
- Length: 31:30
- Label: Metropolis
- Producer: Bill Leeb, Dream Bullet

Bill Leeb chronology
Model Kollapse (2024)	Machine Vision (2025)

Singles from Machine Vision
- 1. "Neuromotive (Stacks Mix by Rhys Fulber)" Released: April 4, 2025

Professional ratings
Review scores
Source	Rating
Spill Magazine	4/5 stars

Machine Vision is an EP by Vancouver industrial musician Bill Leeb. It was released on August 22, 2025 on vinyl and digitally through Metropolis and contains five remixes of songs from Leeb's solo debut album Model Kollapse and a new song.

== Release ==
In April 2025, Metropolis released the single Neuromotive (Stacks Mix by Rhys Fulber) from the EP, which was accompanied by a video by Tim Hill.

== Track listing ==
All tracks are written by Bill Leeb.

No.	Title	Length
1.	"Neuromotive" (Sehr Geil One Mix by Rhys Fulber)	5:25
2.	"Infernum" (Narcissistic Flow Mix by Dream Bullet)	6:00
3.	"Neuromotive" (Stacks Mix by Rhys Fulber)	5:17
4.	"Fusion" (Black Chromium Mix by Dream Bullet)	5:21
5.	"Neuromotive" (Sehr Geil Two Mix by Rhys Fulber)	5:10
6.	"Fireshow"	4:17

== Personnel ==
- Bill Leeb – writing, vocals, electronic instruments, production

=== Technical personnel ===
- Dream Bullet – writing, production
- Allen Jaeger – artwork
- Simon Paul – layout
- Greg Reely – mixing, mastering, vocal recording
