= Water Sports (EP) =

Water Sport

EP by DIN
- Released: 1993
- Genre: Techno; EBM
- Label: DOVe

DIN chronology
Fantastic Planet (1992)	Water Sport (1993)	Decade of the Brain (1994)

Water Sports is an EP by DIN, released in 1993 by DOVe.

== Track listing ==
All music is composed by Jean-Claude Cutz

Side one
No.	Title	Length
1.	"Water Sports" (Olympic Size)	5:32
2.	"Water Sports" (Speedo)	6:25

Side two
No.	Title	Length
1.	"Melon Ball"	5:32
2.	"Tower Skull"	6:25

== Personnel ==
Adapted from the Water Sport liner notes.

DIN

- Jean-Claude Cutz (as Din) – vocals, synthesizer, drum programming

Additional performers

- Dave Rout – drum programming (A1)

== Release history ==
Region	Date	Label	Format	Catalog
Canada	1993	DOVe	LP	Luddite 22
Germany	2010	DIN	LP	DIN 001
