= (FLA)vour of the Weak =

Album by Front Line Assembly

[FLA]vour of the Weak

Studio album by Front Line Assembly
- Released: November 3, 1997
- Recorded: 1997, Cryogenic Studio, Vancouver, B.C.
- Genre: Electro-industrial; electronica; IDM; big beat; drum and bass
- Length: 61:16
- Label: Off Beat, Energy, Metropolis, Synthetic Symphony
- Producer: Bill Leeb, Chris Peterson

Front Line Assembly chronology
Reclamation (1997)	[FLA]vour of the Weak (1997)	Cryogenic Studios (1998)

Singles from [FLA]vour of the Weak
- 1. "Colombian Necktie" Released: November 18, 1997; 2. "Comatose" Released: May 19, 1998

Professional ratings
Review scores
Source	Rating
AllMusic	2.5/5 stars
CMJ New Music Monthly	Mixed
Culture Shock	7/7
Ink 19	Favorable
Kerrang!	4/5 stars
Naked Truth	8/10

[FLA]vour of the Weak is the ninth full-length studio album by industrial music group Front Line Assembly, released in November 1997 by Off Beat.

== Background ==
[FLA]vour of the Weak is the first album of the band to feature Chris Peterson. Peterson had already toured with Front Line Assembly for Caustic Grip and Tactical Neural Implant but had never been part of the creative process. He also had teamed up with Rhys Fulber in the band Will before Fulber became official member of Front Line Assembly. After Fulber's departure, band leader Bill Leeb asked Peterson to join Front Line Assembly.

== Musical style ==
The style is somewhat of a departure from previous releases in the FLA catalog, with the group's beat-heavy signature beginning to take heavy cues from styles such as IDM and breakbeat. "We felt we had come as far as we could with the industrial/metal, all the experimental things.", said singer Bill Leeb, "I think that with 'FLAvour' and with 'Re-Wind', I was trying to do something, not necessarily dance-oriented, but just more 'electronic', almost a low-fi kind of record."

=== Samples ===
"Sado-Masochist" uses samples of Eazy-E from an interview with hip hop group N.W.A while both "Comatose" and "Predator" as well as the B-side "Oblivion" contain samples from 1996 American horror film Hellraiser: Bloodline. Non-album track "Electrocution" from the Colombian Necktie single makes use of samples from Daft Punk's "Rollin' & Scratchin'" and from The Chemical Brothers' "Block Rockin' Beats".

== Release and promotion ==
In 2015, the album saw a limited re-release on vinyl through Canadian label Artoffact.

=== Singles ===
[FLA]vour of the Weak spawned two singles. The "Colombian Necktie" single contains an edit as well as a remix by Tim Schuldt of the title track. It also features two non-album tracks, "Deadlock" and "Electrocution".

The second single, "Comatose", contains the "Ketamin 45mg" and "Valium 15mg" mixes by the band themselves. A third version of the title track ("Prozac 75mg") was remixed by Eat Static, who would deliver another, drastically different, remix of "Comatose" on Re-Wind. The single also contains an exclusive mix of "Oblivion".

Most of the tracks from the singles were re-released in 1999 through Off Beat on the compilation album Explosion together with tracks from the "Circuitry" and "Plasticity" singles. This coincided with the release of Implode and the timing of the compilation's release displeased Bill Leeb.

=== Touring ===
The band embarked on a two-week tour in support of the album.

== Track listing ==
All tracks are written by Bill Leeb and Chris Peterson.

No.	Title	Length
1.	"Corruption" (instrumental)	8:00
2.	"Sado-Masochist"	6:24
3.	"Autoerotic"	6:20
4.	"Colombian Necktie"	6:53
5.	"Evil Playground"	8:42
6.	"Comatose"	6:34
7.	"Life=Leben"	6:40
8.	"Predator" (The song "Predator" ends at 7:40. After 30 seconds of silence (7:40 - 8:10), begins the hidden track "Bill in a Box".)	11:43

== Personnel ==
=== Front Line Assembly ===
- Bill Leeb – production, keyboards, vocals
- Chris Peterson – production, programming, mixing

=== Technical personnel ===
- Adam Drake – editing
- Dave McKean – design, illustration, photography
- Jamie Griffiths – band photography
- Tom Baker – mastering

== Chart positions ==
=== Comatose ===
Chart (1998)	Peak position
Billboard Hot Dance Breakouts	4
