= Model Kollapse =

Studio album by Bill Leeb
- Released: September 13, 2024
- Length: 52:34
- Label: Metropolis
- Producer: Bill Leeb, Dream Bullet, Rhys Fulber, Mimi Page

Bill Leeb chronology
Model Kollapse (2024)	Machine Vision (2025)

Singles from Model Kollapse
- 1. "Terror Forms" Released: July 9, 2024; 2. "Demons" Released: August 9, 2024

Professional ratings
Review scores
Source	Rating
Chain D.L.K.	4/5 stars
Cold War Night Life	Favorable
The Electricity Club	Favorable
Maximum Volume	8.5/10
PlanetMosh	3/5 stars
ReGen	Favorable
Release	8/10
Side-Line	8/10
VerdamMnis	Favorable

Model Kollapse is the first solo album by Vancouver industrial musician Bill Leeb. It was released on September 13, 2024 on CD, vinyl and digitally through Metropolis.

== Release ==
In June 2024, Metropolis announced the album, to be released on September 13, 2024. The first single Terror Forms was released on July 9 along with a video. Metropolis released the second single Demons on August 9, 2024, that was also accompanied by a video. The whole album was made available for streaming by the magazine Side-Line one day before release. On the same day, Metropolis released a video for the song "Muted Obsession".

== Track listing ==
All tracks are written by Bill Leeb and Dream Bullet.

No.	Title	Length
1.	"Demons"	5:01
2.	"Exotic Matter"	4:35
3.	"Neuromotive"	4:16
4.	"Folded Hands"	4:48
5.	"Pinned Down"	5:12
6.	"Terror Forms" (Featuring Actors)	4:56
7.	"Muted Obsession" (Featuring Actors)	5:31
8.	"Simulation"	4:49
9.	"Infernum"	4:34
10.	"Fusion"	4:51
11.	"Erosion Through Time" (Featuring Mimi Page)	4:01

== Personnel ==
- Bill Leeb – writing, vocals, electronic instruments, production

=== Additional musicians ===
- Jason Corbett – guitar (6, 7), keyboard (6, 7)
- Shannon Hemmett – vocals (6, 7)
- Mimi Page – vocals (11), additional production (11)

=== Technical personnel ===
- Dream Bullet – writing, production
- Allen Jaeger – artwork
- Simon Paul – layout
- Greg Reely – mixing, mastering, vocal recording
- Rhys Fulber – additional production (9, 10)

== Chart positions ==
Chart (2024)	Peak position
UK Albums (OCC)	77
