= Fantastic Planet (DIN album) =

Studio album by DIN
- Released: 1992
- Recorded: January – March 1992
- Genre: Techno; EBM
- Length: 58:36
- Label: DOVe

DIN chronology
Fantastic Planet (1992)	Water Sports (1993)

Fantastic Planet is the debut studio album of DIN, released in 1992 by DOVe. The album comprises remixes, remakes and previously unreleased compositions.

== Reception ==
Option compared the music of Fantastic Planet favorably to Kraftwerk and said "this style of electronic techno dance just won't get any better than this"

== Track listing ==
All music is composed by Jean-Claude Cutz

No.	Title	Length
1.	"Travesty"	5:32
2.	"Fantastic Planet"	6:25
3.	"Stab"	6:30
4.	"New Age"	6:08
5.	"I've Seen It's Done"	4:36
6.	"Stilettodisko"	6:30
7.	"Clown Suit"	4:52
8.	"Terroreyes"	4:44
9.	"Son of Ugly"	7:19
10.	"Demented"	6:00

== Personnel ==
Adapted from the Fantastic Planet liner notes.

DIN

- Jean-Claude Cutz (as Din and Pupka Frey) – synthesizer, drums, photography

Production and design

- Heiki Sillaste – cover art, illustrations, design

== Release history ==
Region	Date	Label	Format	Catalog
Canada	1992	DOVe	CD, CS	DOVe 166
Germany	1992	Hyperium	CD	391 0016
