= Vancouver Fashion Week =

Biannual fashion event in Vancouver, Canada

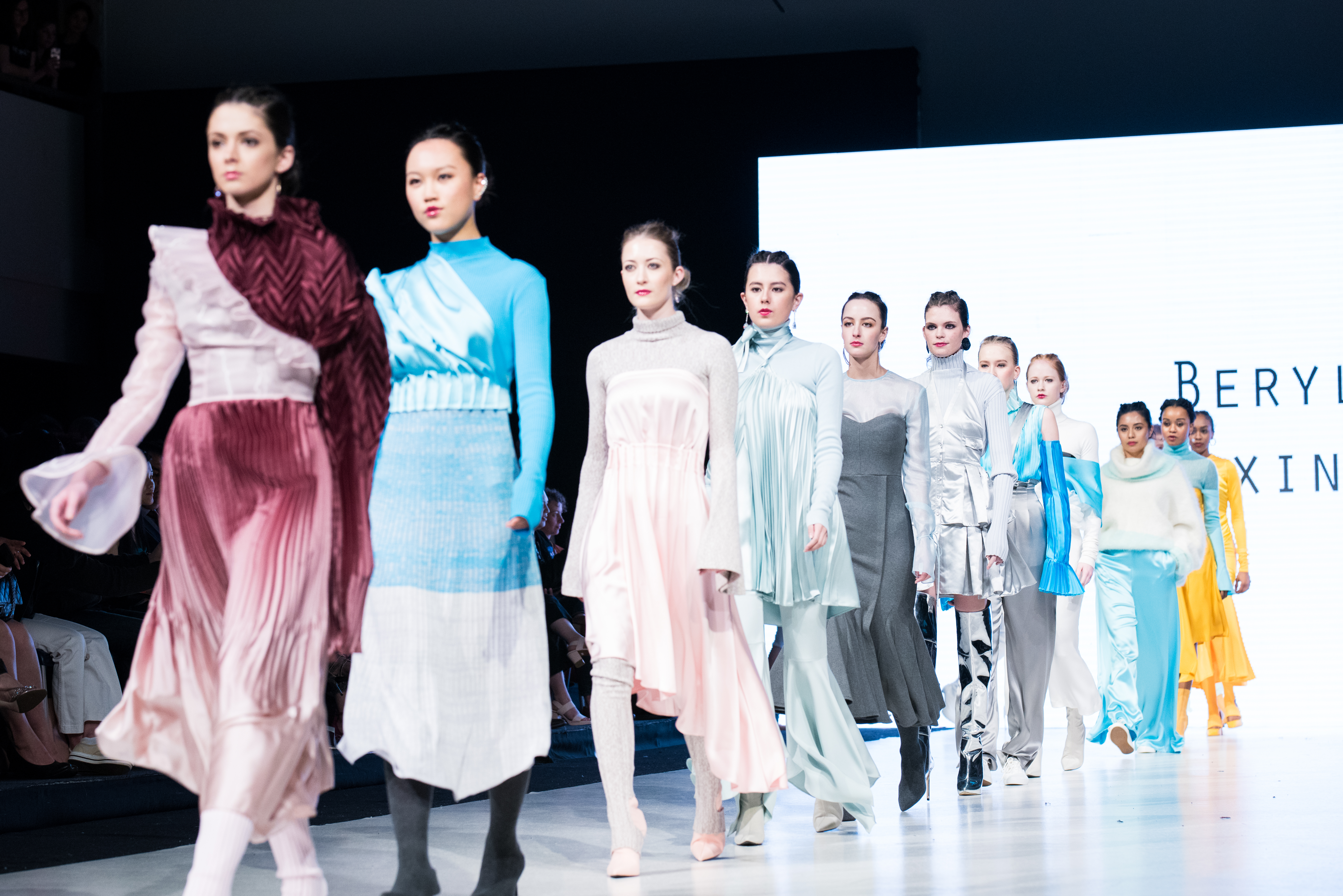
- The F/W18 collection 'Beryl' by Qiongxin Kou, photographed by Tristen Williams
- Dates: September and March
- Frequency: Biannually
- Locations: Vancouver, British Columbia, Canada
- Years active: 2001-present
- People: Jamal Abdourahman
- Website: http://vanfashionweek.com/

Vancouver Fashion Week (VFW) is a fashion week in Vancouver, British Columbia, Canada that is currently run by Jamal Abdourahman. The event is seven days long each season and held twice a year. Vancouver Fashion Week was established in 2001.

Since 2014, the Nancy Mak Award has been presented at Vancouver Fashion Week, a scholarship recognising up-and-coming British Columbia based designers that have a "strong creative vision", a solid business plan, and a desire to expand either their design knowledge or brand’s reach. Awarded once a year, the scholarship is named in honour of Nancy Mak, an active member of the fashion industry and a major supporter of Vancouver Fashion Week during her life.

Vancouver Kids Fashion Week (VKFW) was established in September 2016. The two-day event takes place during Vancouver Fashion Week. VKFW has partnered with BC Children’s Hospital Foundation (BCCHF) donating a portion of ticket sales to the Foundation.

Global Fashion Collective (GFC), an expansion of Vancouver Fashion Week, is a platform specialising in supporting creative designers by establishing their presence around the world. Launched in October 2017.

Since 2018, Vancouver Fashion Week has been producing a digital magazine Micro Macro Magazine, a contemporary design and culture platform.
