= Joel Rosenbaum =

American academic

- Born: October 4, 1933 (age 92); Massena, New York, U.S.
- Education: Syracuse University; St. Lawrence University
- Awards: Newcomb Cleveland Prize (1968); E.B. Wilson Medal (2006)
- Scientific career
- Fields: cell biology
- Workplaces: Yale University

Joel Rosenbaum (born October 4, 1933) is a professor of cell biology at Yale University.

Rosenbaum received his bachelor's degree from Syracuse University in 1955, and later his M.Sc. Ed. from St. Lawrence University in 1957. He returned later to Syracuse for his master's degree in 1959 and Ph.D. in 1963.

His lab at Yale studies cilia and flagella, small tail-like organelles, using the model species Chlamydomonas, a single-cell alga. The lab is best known for its discovery of intraflagellar transport, a vital molecular process now linked to many human diseases, in 1993. Rosenbaum has continued to pursue intraflagellar transport as his main research interest.

Rosenbaum received the E.B. Wilson Medal from the ASCB in 2006, the highest award given in the field of cell biology.
