= Dick DeBenedictis =

American composer

Richard Julian DeBenedictis (born January 23, 1935) is an American composer noted for composing music for television shows including Perry Mason and its movies from 1985 until 1993, Police Story, Columbo, Father Dowling Mysteries, The Rockford Files, Hawaii Five-O, Phyllis, and Matlock, and its spin-offs Jake and the Fatman, and Diagnosis: Murder. He is also known for his production music from East West Symphonic Adventures, which has been used in shows, commercials, video games, and (rarely) films and production logos, such as SpongeBob SquarePants, The Marvelous Misadventures of Flapjack, Arthur, Teen Titans Go!, Unikitty!, Mad, Skunk Fu!, Beavis and Butt-Head, The Loud House, Big City Greens, South Park, BoJack Horseman, The Simpsons, Family Guy, American Dad!, The Cramp Twins, Sanjay and Craig, Drake & Josh, iCarly, Mr. Meaty, Danny Phantom, 6teen, Ben 10, Robotboy, Gravity Falls, Star vs. the Forces of Evil, Phineas and Ferb, The Electric Company, Cyberchase, Drawn Together, Codename: Kids Next Door, Rabbids Invasion, DinoSquad, MonsterQuest, Thomas & Friends, The Amazing World of Gumball, Camp Lazlo, Regular Show, What's New, Scooby-Doo?, Tom and Jerry Tales, The Tom and Jerry show, Invader Zim, Courage the Cowardly Dog, Clone High, Johnny Test, Teenage Mutant Ninja Turtles, Half-Life, MediEvil, Spyro 2: Ripto's Rage, iMovie, etc.

DeBenedictis has been nominated ten times for an Emmy Award, most recently in 1996, for his compositions.

After retiring from television composing, DeBenedictis has taught several master class in Los Angeles and New York City, including California Institute of the Arts, Pepperdine University, Pierce College, Ithaca College, and California Lutheran University.

He is the father of Dean, Brian, Lara and Brent.

== Discography ==
- SCD 709 Dramatic Workshop 26 - Moodsetters, Links & Stings (album released in 2006, tracks recorded in the early 1990s, contains most of his production music tracks)
