= Synæsthesia (Canadian band) =

- Also known as: Synaesthesia
- Origin: Vancouver, British Columbia, Canada
- Genres: Ambient
- Years active: 1995–2001
- Labels: Cleopatra, Zoth Ommog, Hypnotic
- Past members: Bill Leeb; Rhys Fulber

Synæsthesia was a Canadian ambient band formed by industrial musicians Bill Leeb and Rhys Fulber as a side project of their main band Front Line Assembly. Keyboard magazine writes: "Synæsthesia explores dark tribal ambient sounds, composers have a flair for cinematic electronica, and favor epic pieces that unfold slowly."

== History ==
Leeb and Fulber formed Synæsthesia in the 1990s and began recording together. Due to contractual entanglements they were at first not able to admit they were behind the music. Instead credits for their first two albums, Embody and Desideratum, went to "R. Deckard", an allusion to the main character in the film Blade Runner.

The identity of the musicians was revealed with the release of the third album, Ephemeral, crediting Leeb with the music and Fulber with programming. The album incorporates symphonic passages, traditional rhythms and nature sounds into menacing electronic sounds.

Synæsthesia uses samples from a number of musicians and from the film Fire in the Sky.

== Desideratum ==
Desideratum is Synæsthesia's second album of ambient, industrial music, released October 17, 1995, by Cleopatra Records. It was produced by Leeb and Fulber. Its length is 139:15. It received a four of five star rating by AllMusic.

=== Track listing ===
- Disc one
1. "Andromedia" – 8:00
2. "Orion Nebula" – 11:30
3. "Consciousness" – 6:56
4. "Umbra" – 9:00
5. "Barred Spirals" – 9:48
6. "DNA Barcode" – 10:42
7. "Surface System" – 11:20
- Disc two
1. "Dark Core" – 8:08
2. "Subversion" – 8:24
3. "Lumia" – 10:30
4. "Hallucinations" – 9:07
5. "Mosaic" – 9:48
6. "Lifeless" – 15:42
7. "Tubastrea Aurea" – 10:20
- Note: Disc 1 track 2 is labeled incorrectly as "Orion Nebulua". The correct title is "Orion Nebula"

== Discography ==
- Embody (1995, Cleopatra, Zoth Ommog)
- Desideratum (1995, Hypnotic, Zoth Ommog)
- Ephemeral (1997, Hypnotic)
- Cryogenic Studios (1998, Cleopatra) – Compilation of songs from Front Line Assembly and related projects
- Cryogenic Studio, Vol. 2 (2000, Cleopatra) – Compilation of songs from Front Line Assembly and related projects
- The Collection (2001, Hypnotic) – Compilation of songs from the first two albums
