= DIN (musician) =

- Origin: Toronto, Ontario, Canada
- Genres: Techno; EBM
- Years active: 1992–present
- Labels: DOVe; Hypnotic
- Past members: Jean-Claude Cutz
- Website: pupkafrey.com

DIN (or D.I.N.) was a music project founded by Ontario-based composer Jean-Claude Cutz of Digital Poodle. Under his moniker Cutz released two albums for DOVe, Fantastic Planet and Decade of the Brain, and a re-recorded version of his debut titled Fantastic Planet Revisited for Hypnotic Records.

== History ==
DIN was founded in 1992 out of Canada as a solo outlet for Jean-Claude Cutz of Digital Poodle. Cutz used to say "din" as a way of imitating the cowbell sound while beatboxing. DIN's debut was released in 1992 by DOVe and titled Fantastic Planet. Thematically the music is about escapism and fantasy and makes reference to horror and fantasy soundtracks. The EP Water Sports was released in 1993 and was followed by Decade of the Brain in 1994, both released by DOVe. These releases were recognized for Cutz's esoteric combination of techno and ambient music. DIN re-recorded Fantastic Planet and released the sessions on Fantastic Planet Revisited in 1996 for Hypnotic Records.

== Discography ==
Studio albums

- Fantastic Planet (1992, DOVe)
- Decade of the Brain (1994, DOVe)
- Fantastic Planet Revisited (1996, Hypnotic)

Extended plays

- Water Sports (1993, DOVe)
