= Gérard Bélanger =

Canadian economics professor

Gérard Bélanger (born 1940) is a Canadian economics professor. He holds a Bachelor of Arts from the Université de Montréal, a Bachelor of Science and a master's degree in Social sciences from the Université Laval, as well as a master's degree from Princeton University. He is a member of the Royal Society of Canada.

== Career ==
Bélanger is a full professor of economics at the Université Laval since 1977. He was an associate professor from 1971 to 1977 and an assistant professor from 1967 to 1971. In addition to his teaching career, Bélanger held several academic and research positions, such as vice-president of the Société canadienne de science économique (1992–1994), the research coordinator at the C.D. Howe Research Institute (1977–1979), member of the executive committee of the Institute of Public Administration of Canada] (1977–1978), member of the Working Group on Urbanization of the Quebec Government (1974–1976), member of the financing committee of the Conseil des universités (1971–1973), member of the Comité des grandes organisations of the Université Laval (1971–1972), member of the Comité sur les médicaments of the Régie d’assurance-maladie du Québec (1970) and of the Ministry of Social Affairs (1971), and researcher for the Quebec Committee on Financial Institutions (1968).

Bélanger has been a member of the following editorial boards: Revue française de Finances publiques (1983–2000), Industrial Relations (1971–1990), Canadian Journal of Economics (1973–1976), Recherches sociographiques (1974–1982), and L'Actualité Économique (1972–1980).

== Publications ==
=== Books ===
- Le prix de la santé (in collaboration with J.-L. Migué), Montreal: Hurtubise HMH, 1972, 238 p.
- The Price of Health, (in collaboration with J.-L. Migué), Toronto: MacMillan, 1974, 230 p. (slightly modified version of the previous book).
- Le financement municipal au Québec, Quebec: Éditeur officiel du Québec, 1976, 73 p.
- Le prix du transport au Québec (in collaboration with J.-L. Migué and M. Boucher), Québec: Éditeur officiel du Québec, 1978, 502 p.
- Taxes and Expenditures in Québec and Ontario: A Comparison (in collaboration with J. Maxwell et P. Basset), Montreal: C.D. Howe Research Institute, 1978, 64 p.; French version : Impôts et dépenses au Québec et en Ontario: une comparaison, Montréal: Institut de recherches C.D. Howe, 1978, 64 p.
- L'économique du secteur public, Chicoutimi: Gaëtan Morin Éditeur, 1981, 321 p.
- Croissance du secteur public et fédéralisme: perspective économique, Montreal: Agence d'ARC, 1988, 363 p.
- Le système de santé au Québec : organisations, acteurs et enjeux (co-director with V. Lemieux, P. Bergeron and C. Bégin), Ste-Foy : Presses de l'Université Laval, 1994, 370 p; new edition, 2003, 507 p.
- L’Économique de la santé et L’État providence, Montreal : Éditions Varia, 2005, 279 p.
- L’Économique du Québec, mythes et réalité, Montreal : Éditions Varia, 2007, 362 p. (This book won the commemorative Doug Purvis prize in 2007.)

=== Selected articles ===
- "The Theoretical Defence of Decentralization" dans R. Hubbard et G. Paquet (sous la direction de) The Case for Decentralized Federalism, Ottawa : University of Ottawa Press, 2010, p. 68-89.
- "The Paradox of Slow-Growth High-Income Regions", Economic Affairs, vol. 27, no 3, sept. 2007, p. 60-67. (en collaboration avec J.-L. Migué).
- "Peut-on décentraliser la centralisation?", Optimum Online, vol.33, no 1, mars 2003, p. 29-30.
- "Peut-on décentraliser la centralisation?", Optimum Online, vol.32, no 4, déc. 2002, p. 21-24
- "Une façon de privatiser: tarifer les services publics", Revue française de Finances publiques, no 41, 1993, pp. 91–97.
- "Qui paie a bien le droit de choisir", Service Social, vol. 41, no 2, 1992, p 71–85.
- "Quelques difficultés d'interprétation des données sur le secteur public", Revue française de Finances publiques, no 40, 1992, pp. 100–112.
- "Les tendances de la taxation au Canada", Revue française de Finances publiques, no 36, 1991, p. 123-128.
- "Aluminium ou exportation: de l'usage de l'électricité québécoise", Analyse des politiques, vol. XVII, no 2, juin 1991, p. 197-204 (en collaboration avec J.-T. Bernard)
- "Comment on the division of powers" dans R.W. Boadway et al. (sous la direction de), Economic Dimensions of Constitutional Change, Kingston: John Deutch Institute, Queen's University, 1991, vol. 1, p. 307-311.
- "Les utopies fiscales des économistes et la recherche de l'efficacité", Revue française de Finances publiques, no 29, 1990, p. 59-69.
- "La provincialisation des services de santé", Recherches sociographiques, vol. XXI, no.3, 1990, p. 339-357.
