= Bill Leeb =

Austrian-Canadian musician

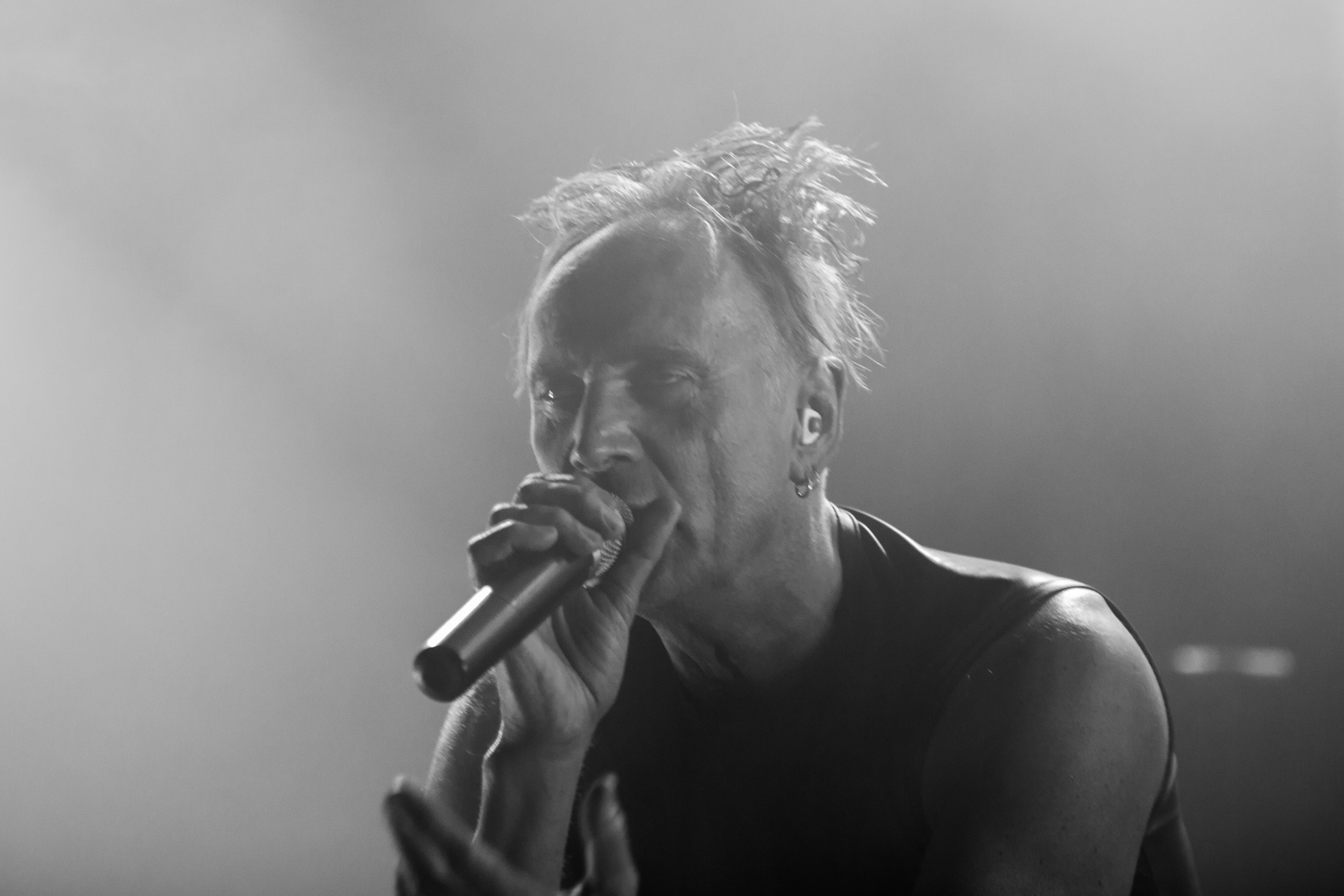
- Bill Leeb performing in 2016

Background information
- Also known as: Bill Leeb, Wilhelm Schroeder
- Born: Wilhelm Anton Leeb; 21 September 1966 (age 59); Vienna, Austria
- Origin: Vancouver, British Columbia, Canada
- Genres: Industrial, electronica
- Occupations: Musician, songwriter, composer, record producer
- Instruments: Vocals, synthesizer, sampler, percussion
- Years active: 1984–present
- Labels: KK, Dossier, Third Mind, Wax Trax!, Roadrunner, Cleopatra, Off Beat, Metropolis, Dependent, Zoth Ommog
- Website: http://www.mindphaser.com

Wilhelm Anton "Bill" Leeb (born 21 September 1966, in Vienna, Austria) is an Austrian-Canadian electronic musician and record producer. He is best known for being a founding member of the industrial music group Front Line Assembly and Delerium. Additionally, Leeb is known for his work with groups Noise Unit, Intermix, Skinny Puppy, Synæsthesia, Cyberaktif, Equinox, Fauxliage, and Pro>Tech.

== Career ==
Leeb began his musical career with industrial band Skinny Puppy in 1984 under the pseudonym Wilhelm Schroeder, contributing bass synth and occasional backing vocals to a few of their recordings and concerts. He left in 1986 and formed his own industrial project Front Line Assembly with Michael Balch, and later Rhys Fulber and Chris Peterson. Though Front Line Assembly has had consistent underground success, Leeb's most widely known efforts are through his side project Delerium, which had a major hit in the late 1990s with "Silence". Leeb composed the soundtrack to the 1999 video game, Quake III Arena, of which the expansion pack, Team Arena, was composed by his band, Front Line Assembly.

In 2017, Leeb appeared as guest singer on the single "A Shiver of Want", a release of John Fryer's project Black Needle Noise.

In 2022, Leeb contributed vocals for Black Asteroid's single "Methane Rain".

In June 2024, American label Metropolis announced Leeb's first solo album Model Kollapse, to be released on September 13, 2024. The first single "Terror Forms" was released on 9 July along with a video. Metropolis released the second single "Demons" on 9 August 2024, that was also accompanied by a video. Leeb explained that the idea of a solo album was suggested by Metropolis founder Dave Heckman, who died before the album's release.

On 22 August 2025, Metropolis released an EP called Machine Vision with five remixes of songs from Model Kollapse and a new song. The single "Neuromotive (Stacks Mix by Rhys Fulber)" from the EP had already been released in April 2025 and accompanied by a video by Tim Hill.

=== Dispute with Trent Reznor ===
In an interview with music magazine Spin in 1992, Trent Reznor of Nine Inch Nails made derogatory remarks about Front Line Assembly, calling them "a textbook case of a band" for industrial music and their music "monotonous, boring, uninspired bullshit". Before the release of the issue, Reznor sent Leeb an apology letter. In one of their following issues, Spin printed part of the apology, in which Reznor expressed that he "should have thought before opening [his] mouth", along with a response from Leeb in which he implores Reznor to "think before making such ludicrous statements" and that he hopes "that others will use a little more thought before they go out of their way to put others down".

=== Acting ===
In 1990, Leeb appeared in the trailer for the horror movie Chunk Blower together with Dwayne Goettel from Skinny Puppy, playing one of the victims of a killer. Due to the lack of funding, the movie was never made. Director Jim Van Bebber and Leeb would later use footage from the trailer in the video for the single "Virus".

== Personal life ==
Leeb has both Austrian and Canadian citizenship and speaks English as well as German. He received education at a convent school in Austria where he learned to play the violin. He moved to Kitimat, British Columbia, Canada with his family when he was 14, where he learned English and developed a keen interest in music. He was a high school student at Mount Elizabeth Secondary School. Leeb went to Camsoun College in Victoria, British Columbia to study journalism for two years. He lives in Vancouver.

Leeb was married to the Canadian artist Carylann Loeppky. Loeppky was part of the tour personnel on Front Line Assembly tours "designing and selling merchandise and put together a visual presentation for the live performance." She continued to create artwork for releases by several of Leeb's projects even after the divorce.

== Solo discography ==
- 2024 - Model Kollapse
- 2025 - Machine Vision

== See also ==
- List of Austrians in music
