= Dilate (musical project) =

- Genre: Ambient
- Years active: 1996–1997
- Label: Hypnotic
- Past members: Victor Wulf

Dilate was an ambient solo project begun in 1996 by composer and synthesizer player Victor Wulf, formerly of the sound collage and industrial music band Vampire Rodents. Wulf released the studio albums Cyclos and Octagon for Hypnotic Records in 1996 and 1997 respectively.

== History ==
Dilate was started by composer Victor Wulf after parting ways with the sound collage project Vampire Rodents in 1993. Wulf had already been began composing since 1977, worked with independent film scoring in Belgium, Canada, Japan, and the United States and performed in Vampire Rodents on the albums War Music and Premonition, released in 1990 and 1992. Dilate released its debut album Cyclos in early 1996 for Hypnotic Records, a sublabel of Cleopatra Records. The album was somewhat well-received critically, with AllMusic awarding the album four out of five stars and the music magazine Keyboard stating "he synthesizers swell majestically, but never sound corny or contrived" and "the rhythms are just organic enough to keep me from thinking I left one of the kitchen appliances running."

Hypnotic Records followed-up Dilate's previous album in mid-1997 with a double album titled Octagon. Jim Brenholts of AllMusic reviewed the album positively and called the compositions "full of textures and sonic clouds." Dilate, and Victor Wulf, has not released an album since 1997's Octagon. In 2000, the album was released again by Hypnotic as the first disc of the New Age...Spiritual Healing box set.

== Reception ==
Cyclos was well-received with the exception of critical opinions of the music sounding inferior to its sources of inspiration, such as Brian Eno, Tangerine Dream and The Orb. Octagon has been described as "deep sonic environmental minimalism" as well as good for meditation.

== Discography ==
- Cyclos (1996, Hypnotic)
- Octagon (1997, Hypnotic)
