= Dean De Benedictis =

American composer, musician, and producer

- De Benedictis at The Gathering 2008

Background information
- Also known as: Surface 10
- Born: Dean De Benedictis; New York City
- Genres: Electronica, experimental, ambient, IDM, Berlin school, jazz fusion, progressive rock, tribal, down tempo, drum & bass
- Instruments: Piano, synthesizer, guitar, voice, Native American flute, percussion
- Years active: 1996—present
- Labels: Hypnotic/Cleopatra, DiN, Spotted Pecarry, Fateless Music, Novabeats
- Website: thestratosensemble.com

Dean De Benedictis is an American composer, musician, performer, and producer of experimental and alternative music. He is a trained musician and has released albums as a solo artist as well as played with groups such as Brand X and The Strato Ensemble.

De Benedictis has recorded under his own name and under the alias "Surface 10", a project in which he gained attention in ambient and experimental electronic music circles. His discography crosses over several genres, but he is primarily known for merging these genres into techno tribal and ambient music. De Benedictis is the founder of both Fateless Records, and the Fateless Flows Collective, a Los Angeles group of electronic composers. He has released three albums with the Fateless Flows Collective through the Fateless Music label.

De Benedictis is the co-founder and producer of Cyberstock, an outdoor music concert and visual arts display held in the Santa Monica Mountains. In its long history, the event has showcased such artists as Nels Cline, Thomas Ronkin, and Richard Derrick.

== Early musical career ==
De Benedictis was educated in Southern California. He is the son of theater and television composer Richard DeBenedictis. His first influences included Pink Floyd, Led Zeppelin, Kraftwerk and Soulsonic Force. Later, he found influence in the progressive jazz fusion, and the Berlin School ambient music genres. When De Benedictis was barely out of high school, he began scoring and composing television source music for several years. Here, he created music in a wide variety of pop styles. At the same time, he was experimenting with electronic music on the side. In his early career, he moved through many jazz fusion and progressive rock bands. In 1996, De Benedictis released his debut ambient electronic music CD on Hypnotic/Cleopatra Records. It had a borderline space rock sound. Early on, he was inspired by such artists as Tangerine Dream and Mark Isham but he has since recorded in several other styles. In A Lone Reply (Fateless, 2001), he produced a more tribal sound, and credited artists such as Steve Roach, Robert Rich, and Loren Nerell. Several reviewers called A Lone Reply "among the very best" of tribal music, and "earns a place alongside essential works like Undercurrents in Dark Water (o yuki) and Soma (Roach and Rich)."

After his debut album as Surface 10, De Benedictis's music continued to grow more experimental and sentimental, and he began to diverge from the dance format of Cleopatra. The label wanted more dance music, but De Benedictis was taking a different path. De Benedictis left Cleopatra in 1999, and began recording on independent labels, including his own, at that time.

== Fateless Records ==
The label was founded in 2001 De Benedictis. It specializes in electronic music, ambient music, and experimental music. It began with the release of "A Lone Reply".

Before 2011, De Benedictis was the only artist on the label. In April 2011, he announced the official relaunch of the Fateless Records and that he would, for the first time, begin carrying other artists on the label. The announcement was made on April 17, 2011, on KXLU in Los Angeles. Some of these artists are veteran recording artists, while others are debuting on this label.

=== Roster ===
- Dean De Benedictis
- Smite Matter
- Zygote
- Fulg3ncy
- Vic Hennegan

== Discography ==
Full-length releases as Dean DeBenedictis

- A Lone Reply, Fateless, 2001.
- Salvaging the Past, Spotted Pecarry, 2005
- A Cambient Variations, Fateless, 2008.

Full-length Releases as Surface 10

- Surface 10, Hypnotic/Cleopatra Records, 1996
- In Vitro Tide, DiN Records, 2000
- Borrowed Time, Space for Music, 2000
- Surface Tensions, DiN Records, 2006
- A Stray Ending, DiN Records, 2023

Compilations featuring Surface 10

- Space Box, Hypnotic/Cleopatra Records, 1996
- Ambient Time Travelers, Hypnotic/Cleopatra Records, 1996
- Tangerine Ambience, a tribute to Tangerine Dream, Hypnotic/Cleopatra Records, 1996
- A Tribute to the Music of Brian Eno, Hypnotic/Cleopatra Records, 1997
- Earth Ritual, Hypnotic/Cleopatra Records, 1997
- Hypnotic Illusions, Hypnotic/Cleopatra Records, 1997
- Ultimate Drum 'N' Bass, Hypnotic/Cleopatra Records, 1997
- Trancespotting, Hypnotic/Cleopatra Records, 1997
- Saturday Night Fetish, Hypnotic/Cleopatra Records, 1997
- The Carnival Within-A Tribute to Dead Can Dance, Hypnotic/Cleopatra Records, 1997
- Loraine, Peach, 1998
- DiN 10, DiN Records, 2001
- Novabeats Sound System Volume 1, Novabeats, 2004
- Fateless Flows Collective Volume 1, Fateless Flows, 2004
- You Wish You Heard It Yesterday-Volume 3, Android Folk, 2005
- Shadowmath: Fateless Flows Collective Volume 2, Fateless Flows, 2005
- Undergrounded: Fateless Flows Collective Volume 3, Fateless Flows, 2006

Full length compilations

- Exempli Gratia (as alias Cathexis, with George Sarah), Hypnotic/Cleopatra Records, 1997
- Solar Prominade (as alias Enterphase, with Jeff Filbert and Fred Becker), A.D., 2004

Full-length releases with The Strato Ensemble

- Drawn Straws, Fateless Records, 2007
