= Hypnotic Records =

American independent record label

- Founded: 1995
- Founder: Brian Perera
- Genre: Dance, house, dubstep, trance, rave, techno
- Country of origin: U.S.
- Location: Los Angeles, California
- Official website: www.cleorecs.com

Hypnotic Records is an American independent record label specializing in electronic music.

== History ==
Hypnotic Records is the sub-label to Cleopatra Records owned by Brian Perera.

== Roster ==
- Blackburner
- Brand Blank
- Brian Perera
- Dirty Sanchez
- Dubstep Junkies
- Effcee
- Electric Heaven
- Future Sound of London
- Katfyr
- Klaypex
- Mike Jones
- New Skin
- DJ Keoki
- Talla 2XLC

=== Notable guests ===
- Nero
- Zeds Dead
- Funkstar De Luxe
- Borgore
- Virius Syndicate
- Dubba Jonny
- Freestylers feat Flux Pavilion
- KOAN Sound
- MartyParty
- Ladytron
- Boys Noize
- Tommie Sunshine
- Rusko
- Unsub/Alexis K

== See also ==
- List of record labels
- List of electronic music record labels
