= Totentanz: The Best of Zoth Ommog =

Compilation album by Various artists
- Released: July 7, 1994
- Genre: Industrial
- Length: 111:39
- Label: Cleopatra

Totentanz: The Best of Zoth Ommog is a various artists compilation album released on July 7, 1994, by Cleopatra Records.

== Reception ==
Professional ratings
Review scores
Source	Rating
Allmusic	2/5 stars

AllMusic gave Totentanz: The Best of Zoth Ommog a rating of two out of five possible stars.

== Track listing ==
Disc one
No.	Title	Writer(s)	Artist	Length
1.	"Adrenaline Rush" (Vegger Version)	Claus Larsen	Leæther Strip	5:34
2.	"Antius"	Larsen	Leæther Strip	4:47
3.	"Strap Me Down"	Larsen	Leæther Strip	5:38
4.	"Leæther Strip Part II"	Larsen	Leæther Strip	4:10
5.	"Abattoir"	Sevren Ni-Arb	X-Marks the Pedwalk	4:11
6.	"Desolation"	Ni-Arb	X-Marks the Pedwalk	7:09
7.	"Helpless"	Ni-Arb	X-Marks the Pedwalk	3:44
8.	"Resist" (Lard Mix)	Uwe Kanka; Dirk Krause	Armageddon Dildos	4:48
9.	"Frontline of Violence"	Kanka; Krause	Armageddon Dildos	5:11
10.	"Godshit" (Re-Processed Relievo Version)	Flemming Norre Larsen; Jesper Schmidt	Psychopomps	5:25
11.	"Animals"	Larsen; Schmidt	Psychopomps	4:47
12.	"The Slaughter"	Larsen; Schmidt	Psychopomps	4:19

Disc two
No.	Title	Writer(s)	Artist	Length
1.	"Sacrilege" (Angel of Death Mix)	Dwayne Dassing; Gary Dassing	Mentallo & The Fixer	7:08
2.	"Rapid Suffocation"	D. Dassing; G. Dassing	Mentallo & The Fixer	5:57
3.	"Guilty"	Claus Larsen	Klute	4:12
4.	"Nothing to Hide"	Larsen	Klute	2:44
5.	"Kalt Wie Stahl" (W.W.B.)	Martin Bodewell; Lars Felker	Orange Sector	3:11
6.	"Mean Machine"	Dirk Ivens; Guy Van Mieghem	Blok 57	4:30
7.	"Gods and Children" (Brimstone Mix)	Jeremy Daw	Yeht Mae	5:28
8.	"A Kind of Loss" (New Mix)	Sevren Ni-Arb	Ringtailed Snorter	4:56
9.	"Succumber"	Matt Green; Athan Maroulis; Rob Morton	Spahn Ranch	4:38
10.	"Deal in Sex" (Protection Mix)	Torben Schmidt	Lights of Euphoria	4:07
11.	"Deep Down"	Ni-Arb; Alexis Schaar	A-Head	5:06

== Personnel ==
Adapted from the Totentanz: The Best of Zoth Ommog liner notes.

- Endless Graphics – design
- Jo-Ann Greene – liner notes

== Release history ==
Region	Date	Label	Format	Catalog
United States	1994	Cleopatra	CD	CLEO94712
