= Decoded Feedback =

Canadian musical project

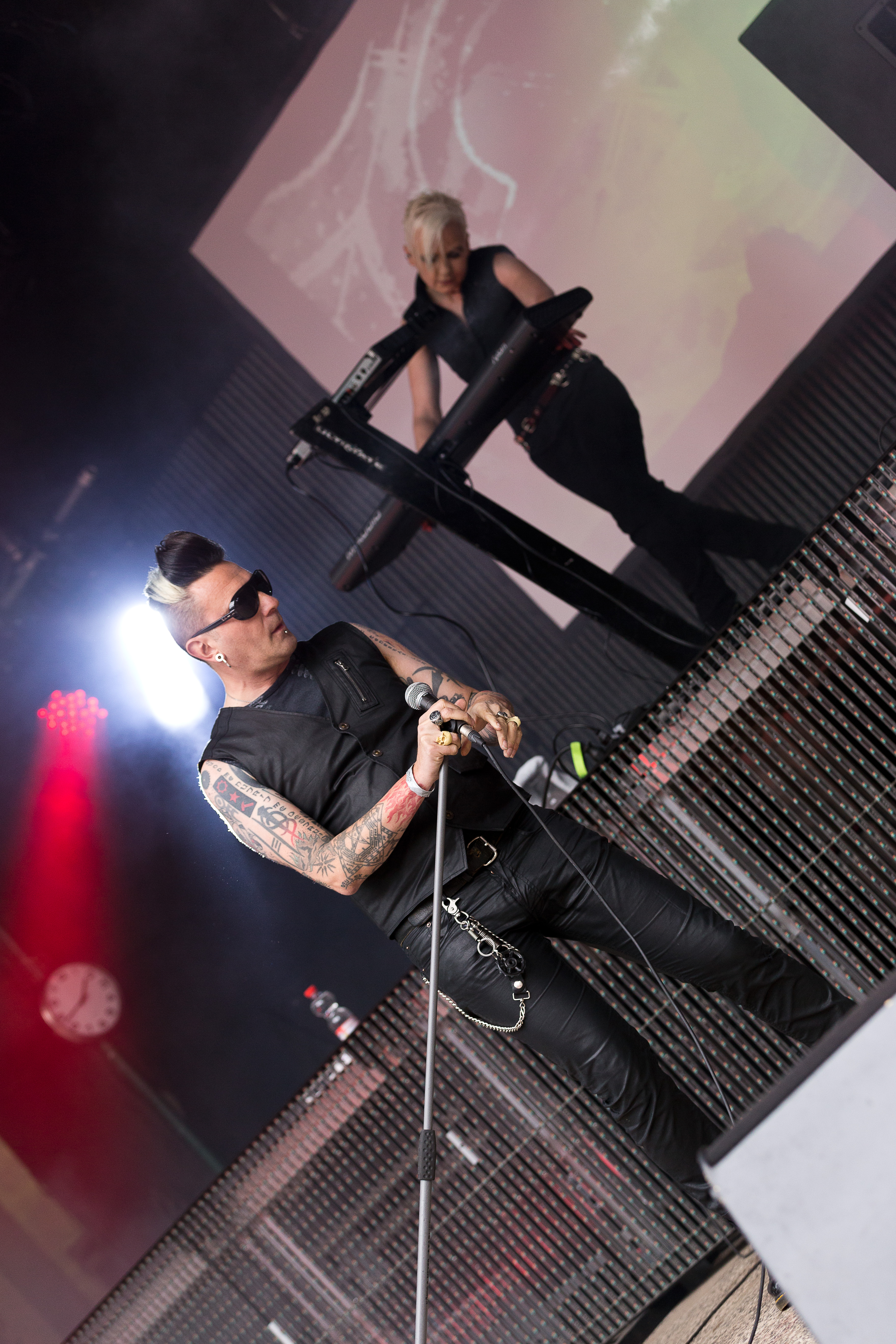
- Decoded Feedback at the Nocturnal Culture Night festival in Germany, 2015.

Background information
- Origin: Canada
- Genres: EBM; Aggrotech; Futurepop; Dark electro Electro-industrial
- Years active: 1993–2021
- Labels: Zoth Ommog; Metropolis; Bloodline; Hard Records; Dying Culture; Out Of Line; Dependent; Infacted Recordings
- Members: Yone Dudas; Marco Biagiotti

Decoded Feedback is a Canadian musical project which incorporates styles of electro-industrial and aggrotech. The duo releases music on the North American distributor Metropolis Records, and the European record label Infacted Recordings.

== History ==
Decoded Feedback was formed in 1993 by the Italian Marco Biagiotti (vocals, lyrics, samples, sequences, arrangement, basses and drums) and the Hungarian Yone Dudas (keyboards, sequences, arrangement, samples, basses, drums and lyrics) while they were both living in Italy. The duo met in an industrial night club in Budapest, Hungary and developed a friendship through EBM and industrial music that led to a collaboration for producing original music. Their demo tape entitled Decoded Feedback was reviewed by the Belgian industrial music magazine Side-Line, which led to the group being signed to the European label, Hard Records.

The group relocated to Toronto, Canada, in 1995, and a year later Hard Records released their first full-length CD, Overdosing. Due to format changes at Hard Records, the label began letting go of most of their signed artists but Hard Records' Christian Rosén liked their music so much that he introduced the band to Torben Schmidt at Zoth Ommog. Zoth Ommog released Decoded Feedback's second disc, Technophoby, in 1997. Since then, American industrial music distributors Metropolis Records have released domestic versions of all subsequent Decoded Feedback albums.

In 2000, Biagiotti and Dudas signed to the record label Bloodline to release Mechanical Horizon, which was preceded by the first ever Decoded Feedback single, "Reflect in Silence". Three years later, Decoded Feedback switched to their current European record label, Out of Line, and released Shockwave, which was preceded by a single, "Phoenix". In 2005, they released Combustion as well as contributing the soundtrack for the Cindy Murdoch's short zombie film, Red Men Rising (music credited to Yone).

The 2010s yielded three albums: Aftermath, released in 2010, disKonnekt in 2012, and Dark Passenger released in 2016. The single from Dark Passenger entitled "Waiting for the Storm" inspired the creation of and provided the working title for the full-length feature film Strangers at the Door by director Rogelio Salinas.

Several of their albums have ranked on the German Alternative Charts including Bio-Vital, released in 1998, Shockwave, voted #3 Top International Album of 2003, and Aftermath voted #5 on May 27, 2010 and staying on the DAC for 7 weeks reaching #2.

=== Live ===
Decoded Feedback conducted their first U.S. tour in 1998 and have played several live shows in Europe. The band spent the greater part of 2001 touring with Noisex and Sonar and again in 2003 with Haujobb. They have played the M'era Luna Festival, the Blacksun Festival in the US, Infest 2005, and the Out of Line Festival, as well as touring with fellow Metropolis Records bands God Module and Blutengel. In Toronto, Canada, at the EBM Fest 2008, they played as a DJ set because Marco was not present.

== Philosophy and style ==
Yone studied at The Royal Conservatory of Music in Toronto for a short time, but otherwise the duo had no formal music training. Both Yone and Marco cite early electronic music - e.g.: Jean-Michel Jarre and Kraftwerk–as well as new wave music as influences. Yone cites classical music and punk rock as further influences, while Marco cites an affinity for gothic rock.

Both members have also cited the tensions that exist between sexes and international boundaries, as well as their unique backgrounds, as a driving force behind their music–especially in an attempt to create their own unique style.

They originally experimented with the fusion of punk and electro, but over time developed a more cold, industrial-oriented sound. While the band acknowledges that they are heavily influenced by danceable club music, they never set out explicitly to create dance music, but strive to strike a combination of "strength and beauty" in their compositions. By the time Evolution was released, they created a blend of industrial and electronic body music, with "interwoven dance floor textures and symphonic melodies". This sound culminated with Mechanical Horizon, but turned sharply with Shockwave, an album that was seen as something of a return to an older style. Combustion continued this trend.

Decoded Feedback's music is popular within the darker electronic music scene, especially among fans of electro-industrial music. Comparable artists include fellow Metropolis Records acts Haujobb, Wumpscut, Suicide Commando and Front Line Assembly, as well as Zoth Ommog acts Leæther Strip, X Marks the Pedwalk, and Evils Toy.

During the 1990s, the band identified with M.A.C.O.S. (Musicians Against Copywriting of Samples), a movement that asserted that the fair use of sampled portions of music and movies should be legally available for reuse in artistic works.

== Discography ==
- Decoded Feedback - (CS) 1993 - no label
- Elektroküte – (CS mini album) 1994 - no label
- Overdosing – (CD album) 1996 - Hard Records, Cleopatra • (CD album) 2002 - Dying Culture
- Technophoby – (CD album) 1997 - Zoth Ommog, Metropolis
- Bio-Vital – (CD album) 1998 - Zoth Ommog • 1999 Metropolis
- Evolution – (CD) 1999 - Zoth Ommog, Metropolis – #12 CMJ RPM Charts
- Mechanical Horizon – (CD album) 2000 - Metropolis, Bloodline – #36 CMJ RPM Charts
- "Reflect in Silence" – (CD maxi) 2000 - Bloodline
- "Phoenix" – (CD maxi) 2002 - Out Of Line
- Shockwave – (CD album, enhanced) 2003 - Metropolis, Out of Line • (CD album, enhanced) 2004 - Irond
- BioMechanic – (2xCD) 2004 - Metropolis, Out of Line
- Combustion – (CD album, enhanced) 2005 - Out of Line, Metropolis • (CD album, enhanced) 2005 - Irond
- Aftermath – (CD album) 2010 - Metropolis, Dependent
- disKonnekt - (CD album) 2012 - Metropolis, Dependent
- Dark Passenger - (CD album) 2016 - Metropolis, Infacted Recordings

=== Other projects ===
- Hyberia – 2005, soundtrack
- Red Men Rising – 2005, soundtrack, (Yone Dudas solo)
- Strangers at the Door - 2017, soundtrack

The above soundtracks have not been released in any format other than in the movies themselves. Hyberia is a short 3 minute film by Francis T who directed the music videos for the Decoded Feedback songs "Phoenix" and "Hyberia" (the latter of which uses audio elements from the soundtrack). Red Men Rising is a 15 minute film about zombies, the soundtrack to which was recorded by Yone Dudas. Strangers at the Door is a feature film directed by Rogelio Salinas who also produced the band's music video for the song "Another Loss" from the album disKonnekt.
