= Cenotaph (disambiguation) =

A cenotaph is a memorial monument, often used as a war memorial. The most famous example is arguably the Cenotaph in London.

Cenotaph or the Cenotaph may also refer to:

== Monuments and memorials ==
Australia

- Sydney Cenotaph, Australia
- Hobart Cenotaph, Australia

Canada

- Cenotaph (Montreal), Canada
- Cenotaph (Regina, Saskatchewan), Canada
- National War Memorial (Canada), Ottawa
- Victory Square, Vancouver, Canada

Hong Kong

- The Cenotaph, Hong Kong

New Zealand

- Auckland Cenotaph
- Dunedin Cenotaph
- Wellington Cenotaph

Malaysia

- The Cenotaph, Kuala Lumpur, Malaysia
- The Cenotaph, Penang, Malaysia

Singapore

- The Cenotaph, Singapore

South Africa

- The Cenotaph, Cape Town, South Africa
- The Cenotaph, Durban, South Africa
- The Cenotaph, Johannesburg, South Africa

United Kingdom

- The Cenotaph, Whitehall, London, England
- The Cenotaph, Southampton, England
- Manchester Cenotaph, England
- Belfast Cenotaph, Northern Ireland

United States

- Alamo Cenotaph, San Antonio, Texas
- Cenotaph Square (Indianapolis), Indiana

Zimbabwe

- The Cenotaph, Bulawayo

== Music ==
- Cenotaph (band), a Turkish death metal band
- “Cenotaph”, a 1981 song by the English band This Heat from their second album Deceit
- Cenotaph (Bass Communion album) (2011) or its title track
- Cenotaph (EP), a 1989 EP by Bolt Thrower or its title track
- "Cenotaph" (song), a 1992 song by X Marks the Pedwalk
- "Cenotaph", a song by the Smashing Pumpkins from Atum: A Rock Opera in Three Acts, 2023
- 20 Odd Years, Vol. 4: Cenotaph, a 2011 maxi single by Buck 65
- "Cenotaph", a song by Swedish rock band Ghost on their 2025 album Skeletá.

== Other uses ==
- "Cenotaph", a two-part episode of Kung Fu
