= Pro-death =

"Pro-death" or "pro-death-penalty" could mean being in favor of capital punishment.

"Pro-death" or "Pro-Death" can also refer to:

- Favoring a specific expression of death in culture, such as war, suicide, or euthanasia
- Pro-Death Ravers, the second album by Danish band Psychopomps
- In biochemistry, causing apoptosis or cell death
- PRO-DEATH, a metallic rock band
- As a pejorative term, favoring the abortion-rights movement
