= HeadCrash =

German-American rock band

- Origin: Kaiserslautern, Germany
- Genres: industrial metal; rap metal; alternative metal
- Years active: 1992–1999, 2001–2006, 2014–2017
- Labels: EastWest; Discovery; Sony; Zoth Ommog; Bit Bites Brain; Rookie
- Past members: See below

HeadCrash were a German-American metal band formed in 1992. The original members consisted of Allen Wright (vocals), Herwig Meyszner (guitars), Fritz Weber (drums/programming), and Ulrich Franke (keyboards/programming). After the release of their debut album in 1993 on Zoth Ommog, Scapegoat, HeadCrash were signed to the major label EastWest Records. Towards the end of the follow-up album's recording sessions, Weber committed suicide. The remaining members finished the album and released it in early 1994, Direction of Correctness. The lineup was revised with the additions of guitarist Roger Ingenthron, drummer Nico Berthold, and second vocalist Shane Cooper. The sextet re-recorded the Direction of Correctness song "Freedom" for release as a single and video, and it found moderate airplay on US college radio and MTV.

HeadCrash's third album in 1995, Overdose on Tradition, was released on both EastWest Records and Discovery Records. The band's popularity increased in Germany as the album peaked at No. 98 on the country's Top 100 Albums chart, while the album's lead single "Safehouse" appeared in various US trade publications' charts. For the tours in support of Overdose on Tradition, the lineup was expanded to seven members as Otto Van Alphen was added as bassist. In 1997, Franke and Berthold left the band, followed by HeadCrash switching labels to Sony Records. With the lineup of Wright (vocals), Cooper (vocals), Meyszner (guitars), Ingenthron (guitars), Alphen (bass), and Matthias Liebetruth (drums), HeadCrash released their final major label album in 1998, Lifeboat.

HeadCrash initially disbanded in 1999 as the members focused on other projects; however, Meyszner and Cooper reformed the band in 2001. With the lineup of Meyszner on guitars, Cooper on vocals, Justin Stone on bass, and Andy Klein on drums, HeadCrash released the album Cranium in 2006, although they disbanded a second time that same year. From 2014 to 2017, original vocalist Wright reunited with Cooper and Meyszner as the band played one-off shows and released standalone singles.

== History ==
=== Formation, Scapegoat, major label signing, and death of Weber (1989–1993) ===
In the late 1980s and early 1990s, the German duo of Ulrich Franke and Fritz Weber formed various electronica projects under a wide variety of names such as Cybex Factor, Pink Noise, Anaconda, among others (with Tom Melling as a frequent third collaborator). They released the single "God & Evil" in 1989, which created controversy due to an edited explicit image of Pope John Paul II on the single's cover. The duo was sued by the Catholic Church, although it was later thrown out of court. To release their projects, Franke and Weber started their own record label entitled Bit Bites Brain. Around the same time, vocalist Allen Wright (who was an American living in Germany) was the final singer in the punk rock band Wedding Tackle; they disbanded in 1992. That same year, Wright, Franke, and Weber teamed up with guitarist Herwig Meyszner to form a new band. Wright was on lead vocals, Meyszner was on guitars, Weber was on keyboards and programming (which included the drum machine), and Franke was on keyboards and programming (in addition to production). The band contributed a remix to the Armageddon Dildos single "Homicidal Maniac" for the major label Sire Records under the name The HeadCrash Posse. The band eventually shortened their name to simply HeadCrash afterwards.

Initially, their project was envisioned as a studio effort only, with no intentions of playing live. The quartet recorded and released their debut album, Scapegoat, in 1993. It was released on the prominent electronic label Zoth Ommog. Scapegoat managed to attract industry attention, and HeadCrash were subsequently signed by the major label EastWest Records that same year. The band then commenced recording of their second album throughout the year. During the process, guitarist Roger Ingenthron from the hardcore punk band Spermbirds assisted HeadCrash in the studio. He was eventually made an official member of the band during the sessions. Although the band largely self-produced themselves, Victory guitarist Tommy Newton was involved with production as well.

Tragedy struck the band in December 1993 when Weber committed suicide. Exact details were not reported and no note was found. His death was later mentioned in the liner notes of HeadCrash's second album along with the passing of Meyszner's father due to lung cancer. Since the album was nearly finished and also the signing to EastWest Records, HeadCrash opted to continue on.

=== Direction of Correctness, expanded lineup, and Overdose on Tradition (1994–1996) ===
When the album, entitled Direction of Correctness, was finished, HeadCrash decided to no longer be a studio-exclusive project; thus, they enlisted second vocalist Shane Cooper and drummer Nico Berthold into the band. Berthold knew the members beforehand, as he contributed to one track on Direction of Correctness. Wright had previously met Cooper at Kaiserslautern High School, which housed a U.S. military base within Germany. With approximately 50,000 American residents, the vicinity was the largest community of Americans outside of the United States mainland.

Direction of Correctness was released in March 1994 on EastWest Records. HeadCrash played their very first live show that same month in Germany, despite initially forming nearly two years earlier. "Black Gold" and "Freedom" were released as singles to support the album. The single version of "Freedom" was re-recorded and remixed so that the entire lineup was included on the track. A music video was also produced for the song and it found occasional airplay on MTV's Headbanger's Ball and 120 Minutes; however, the band were dissatisfied with the final outcome as they felt that their vision was lost. During the second half of 1994, Ingenthron had to leave HeadCrash to focus on his other band Spermbirds. As a result, Junior Douglas from the band War Dance joined the band on tour. HeadCrash's first major tour was as the openers for the hip-hop group Boo-Yaa T.R.I.B.E. throughout Europe. The song "Scapegoat", which originally appeared on the Scapegoat album and then re-recorded for Direction of Correctness, also appeared on the soundtrack to the Spanish-Italian black comedy film The Day of the Beast in 1995.

Ingenthron rejoined HeadCrash and replaced Douglas after the 1994 tours. Throughout 1995, HeadCrash recorded and then released their third album Overdose on Tradition. For the first time, HeadCrash recorded outside of Germany, as they went to Los Angeles to work with producer Jonathan Burnside (he previously produced for the likes of Jawbreaker, Helios Creed, and Fu Manchu). Other individuals involved with the album were Melling (who collaborated with Franke and Weber prior to HeadCrash) and Mark Pistel (frontman of Consolidated). While EastWest Records handled the European release, the American release was distributed by Discovery Records. The album gained coverage in various United States publications. It peaked at No. 32 on The Hard Report Hard Hitters chart, at No. 17 on The Gavin Report Gavin Rocks chart, at No. 13 on Hits Rock chart, and at No. 18 on CMJ New Music Report Metal Top 25 chart. In Germany, Overdose on Tradition peaked at No. 98 on the country's Top 100 Albums chart. "Safehouse" was released as the lead single from Overdose on Tradition and a music video was produced as well. HeadCrash retained greater control over the video's concept due to the previous problems with the "Freedom" video; however, due to explicit scenes of drug use and self-harm, the video was outright banned by MTV. As the tour for Overdose on Tradition kicked off in late 1995, the band expanded their lineup to seven members as they added Otto Van Alphen on bass. The band mainly toured Europe instead of the United States and played at festivals such as F MusicFest '96, Osterrocknacht 1996, and the Strange Noise Festival in front of 35,000 attendees. They also went on tour with Thumb to support Overdose on Tradition.

In 1996, HeadCrash released Fresh Ingredients on Franke's Bit Bites Brain label. It consisted of remixes, live tracks, the aforementioned re-recorded version of "Freedom", and a re-recorded version of "Free Your Mind" (originally from Scapegoat) which was conducted during the Overdose on Tradition sessions with Burnside as producer. Special guest remixers included Andreas Rieke and Consolidated's Pistel. That same year, HeadCrash's Cooper, Berthold, and Alphen teamed up with Arts and Decay's Markus Weilemann and Ernst-Ludwig Hesky to form the supergroup Lungbutter. They released one album with Franke as producer and Wright as a guest vocalist, entitled Release, on EastWest Records.

=== Lifeboat and first disbandment (1997–1999) ===
Both Berthold and Franke departed from HeadCrash in early 1997. Franke's keyboardist position was not replaced while Berthold was replaced on drums by Matthias Liebetruth. HeadCrash subsequently did not play any live shows throughout the entirety of 1997. Around the same time, HeadCrash's two main labels (EastWest Records and Discovery Records) had internal shifts within their managements. Both labels separately dissolved which meant that many artists on the rosters were dropped.

The band eventually switched labels to Sony Records. HeadCrash then released their fourth album Lifeboat on Sony's Dragnet Records division in 1998. Both "Snake in the Grass" and "Asphalt Ostrich" were released as singles. "Asphalt Ostrich" was used in the film Lost in Space and was included on the European version of the accompanying soundtrack. They toured behind the album by playing shows with bands such as H-Blockx, Lodestar, and Pansy Division. They also appeared at festivals such as the Rock am Ring and the Bizarre Festival, the latter of which was Ingenthron's final show with the band. He was replaced on guitar by Allard Zwemstra. For the 1998 year, HeadCrash won the Best Live Band award by the readers of the German magazine Visions. The band attempted to record a follow-up album titled Pulse throughout the subsequent two years, but in 1999 they disbanded as the members focused on other projects. Seven tracks from the aborted Pulse sessions were released later in 1999 unofficially on the Forge Ahead compilation.

=== Initial reunion, Cranium, and second disbandment (2001–2006) ===
Towards the end of 2001, both Meyszner and Cooper reformed HeadCrash. They were the only two members from the prior lineups to rejoin, and as such the band reverted to only four members as brothers Paul Stone and Justin Stone joined on drums and bass respectively. The reformed lineup released the demo EP 2002 and afterwards, Paul Stone departed from the band and was replaced by Andy Klein. A second demo EP had appeared as well, Peas in a Pod. Four years later, HeadCrash released their fifth album Cranium (stylized as [cranium]) on Rookie Records. Later that same year, the band disbanded for a second time.

=== Reformation with Wright and subsequent events (2014–2022) ===
In 2014, HeadCrash came out of a hiatus again, except with Wright rejoining Meyszner and Cooper. Justin Stone also returned on bass while Andreas Lill was added on drums and Andy Kromarek was added as a second guitarist. Their reunion show was in March 2014. They then played various one-off shows and brief tours. In August 2015, HeadCrash released their first new material in nine years, the single "Human", produced by Jacob Hansen. Around the same time, the majority of HeadCrash's back catalog was added onto streaming services such as Spotify and YouTube. In November of that year, the band played their final live show. Two more songs from the "Human" sessions were then released digitally later on in 2017. Another outtake from the same sessions, "Thoughts and Prayers", was shared by the band's official outlets in June 2022.

== Other projects ==
Between HeadCrash's hiatuses and after their third disbanding, the members all pursued different projects.

Wright, Alphen, and Zwemstra went on to form the rap metal band End of April, releasing two albums in 2003 and 2004 before disbanding. Wright then created Go Down Believing Management, with the Ukrainian band Jinjer as their most successful client. After End of April's disbandment, Alphen became a professional sailor while also commissioning music to various films and shows. Berthold eventually created his own studio in Berlin, Viktoria Studios, and worked as a producer and mixer for artists such as Wizo and Kraftklub. Ingenthron continued with his prior band Spermbirds, followed by a solo project called Roger TV.

Liebetruth ended up in various bands such as Running Wild and Toxic Taste. He later became the drum technician for the German metal band Scorpions. After leaving HeadCrash, Franke initially continued his electronica projects, typically with Melling, under different names such as Cosomo & Tom, DJ Capriccioso, and Deep Base Nine. Franke also continued to run the label he formed with the deceased Weber, Bit Bites Brain. Meyszner became a film producer for other bands, working on documentaries and videos for artists such as Lacuna Coil, Motörhead, Cypress Hill, and Saxon. Cooper wrote and self-published a biography titled Floodgate (under his Nitrous Oxide alias) shortly after HeadCrash's first disbandment. He eventually took a break from the music industry before joining the band Peace Officer in the late 2000s, which was initially formed by Kromarek. He then launched his own solo project, ShanEye, in 2020.

== Members ==
Past members

- Allen Wright - vocals (1992–1999, 2014–2017)
- Herwig Meyszner - guitars (1992–1999, 2001–2006, 2014–2017)
- Ulrich Franke - keyboards, programming (1992–1997)
- Fritz Weber - drums, programming (1992–1993; died 1993)
- Roger Ingenthron - guitars (1993–1994, 1995–1998)
- Nico Berthold - drums (1994–1997)
- Shane Cooper - vocals (1994–1999, 2001–2006, 2014–2017)
- Junior Douglas - guitars (1994–1995)
- Otto Van Alphen - bass (1995–1999)
- Matthias Liebetruth - drums (1997–1999)
- Allard Zwemstra - guitars (1998–1999)
- Paul Stone - drums (2001–2003)
- Justin Stone - bass (2001–2006, 2014–2017)
- Andy Klein - drums (2003–2006)
- Andreas Lill - drums (2014–2017)
- Andy Kromarek - guitars (2014–2017)

Timeline

== Discography ==
Studio albums

- Scapegoat, 1993 (Zoth Ommog)
- Direction of Correctness, 1994 (EastWest Records)
- Overdose on Tradition, 1995 (EastWest Records/Discovery Records)
- Lifeboat, 1998 (Sony Records/Dragnet Records)
- Cranium, 2006 (Rookie Records)

Other releases

- Fresh Ingredients, 1996 (Bit Bites Brain); compilation of remixes and live tracks
- Pulse, 1999 (Dragnet Records); incomplete album
- 2002, 2002 (One Good Eye); demo EP
- Peas in a Pod, 2002 (One Good Eye); demo EP

Singles

- "Black Gold", 1994 (EastWest Records)
- "Freedom", 1994 (EastWest Records)
- "Safehouse", 1995 (EastWest Records/Discovery Records)
- "Asphalt Ostrich", 1998 (Dragnet Records)
- "Snake in the Grass", 1998 (Dragnet Records)
- "Human", 2015 (Rookie Records)

Videos

- "Scapegoat", 1993
- "Black Gold", 1994
- "Freedom", 1994
- "Safehouse", 1995
- "Asphalt Ostrich", 1998
- "X-Friend", 2002
