= Paranoid Illusions =

Single by X Marks the Pedwalk
- Released: 1993
- Recorded: ???
- Genre: Industrial
- Length: 26:49
- Label: Zoth Ommog
- Songwriter(s): Sevren Ni-Arb
- Producer(s): Sevren Ni-arb (André Schmechta)

X Marks the Pedwalk singles chronology
"'The Trap'" (1993)	"Paranoid Illusions" (1993)	"'Facer'" (1994)

Paranoid Illusions is a single by German industrial music band X Marks the Pedwalk, the second from the album Human Desolation. It was released by Zoth Ommog in Europe as both an LP and CD.

== Summary ==
Paranoid Illusions is the seventh single by X Marks the Pedwalk, and the second from the album Human Desolation. It was the first X Marks the Pedwalk single not to be pressed on vinyl, and was released on CD by Zoth Ommog records with the catalogue number ZOT 28 CD.

Although the artwork for Paranoid Illusions closely resembles that of Human Desolation, André Schmechta has admitted to not liking it.

== Track listing ==
1. "Paranoid Illusions (Face Edit)" – 4:39
2. "I See You (Extended)" – 5:08
3. "Consciousness" – 2:52
4. "Why?" – 3:58
5. "Paranoid Illusions (Sky Mix)" – 7:29
6. "I See You (Second View)" – 2:43

== Personnel ==
- Sevren Ni-arb (André Schmechta)
- Raive Yarx (Thorsten Schmechta)
