= In the Skin =

In the Skin may refer to:

- In the Skin (album), 1997 album by 36 Crazyfists
- In the Skin (EP), 1993 EP by Psychopomps
