= Freaks (X Marks the Pedwalk album) =

Studio album by X Marks the Pedwalk
- Released: 1992
- Recorded: 1992
- Genre: Industrial
- Label: Zoth Ommog, Metropolis Records
- Producer: Sevren Ni-arb (André Schmechta) and AL/X/S

X Marks the Pedwalk chronology
Freaks (1992)	Human Desolation (1993)

Alternative covers
- Metropolis Records' version

Freaks is the first full-length release by the German industrial music band X Marks the Pedwalk. It was originally released by Zoth Ommog in Europe as both an LP and CD, and was later released by Metropolis Records in North America with slightly different artwork and track list.

== Summary ==
Freaks, which was preceded by the "Abattoir" single, expanded on an already well-established sound for the band. Although it was their first full-length LP, the duo of Sevren Ni-arb and Regan Eracs had released three non-album singles plus "Abattoir", all through Germany's Zoth Ommog record label. However, this is the only full-length X Marks the Pedwalk release with Regan Eracs, who left after the production of "Cenotaph", a single which followed Freaks.

Freaks is arguably monumental in developing a sound for X Marks the Pedwalk. The song "Abattoir" is hailed by Sevren Ni-arb as the "breakthrough for XMTP" and the album as a whole has been described as a "unique fusion of industrial and techno...".

== Track listing ==
=== Zoth Ommog version ===
1. "Abattoir" – 4:07
2. "Zest" – 3:36
3. "Repression" – 5:19
4. "Swastika" – 4:08
5. "Express My Sentiments Exactly" – 3:43
6. "The Shot" – 4:09
7. "Helpless" – 3:40
8. "Battered Babies" – 3:56
9. "Church for Snow White" – 3:37
10. "Epilogue: Desert In Dawn" – 2:15
11. "Feast of the Resurrection" – 5:23 (CD Only)

=== Metropolis Records version ===
1. "Zest" – 3:36
2. "Repression" – 5:19
3. "Swastika" – 4:08
4. "Express My Sentiments Exactly" – 3:43
5. "The Shot" – 4:09
6. "Helpless" – 3:40
7. "Battered Babies" – 3:56
8. "Church for Snow White" – 3:37
9. "Epilogue: Desert In Dawn" – 2:15
10. "Feast of the Resurrection" – 5:23
11. "I See You (Second View)"
12. "No Premonition (Re-edit)"
13. "Paranoid Illusions (Sky Mix)"
14. "Interruption"

== Personnel ==
- Sevren Ni-arb
- Regan Eracs
