= The Trap (song) =

Single by X Marks the Pedwalk
- Released: 1993
- Recorded: 1993
- Genre: Industrial
- Length: 16:54
- Label: Zoth Ommog
- Songwriter: Sevren Ni-Arb
- Producer: Sevren Ni-arb (André Schmechta)

X Marks the Pedwalk singles chronology
| "'Cenotaph'" (1992) | "The Trap" (1993) | "'Paranoid Illusions'" (1993) |

The Trap is a single by German industrial music band X Marks the Pedwalk, taken from the album which follows it, Human Desolation. It was released by Zoth Ommog in Europe as both an LP and CD.

== Summary ==
The Trap is the fifth single by X Marks the Pedwalk, the sixth including the band's earlier name, Scarecrow. "The Trap", like Abattoir, preceded the release of the full-length album from which it was taken, in this case the album was Human Desolation. The preceding single, Cenotaph, was the last appearance by Sevren Ni-Arb's bandmate Regan Eracs, thus to fill the void for the production of The Trap, Sevren Ni-Arb enlisted the help of his brother, who became known as Raive Yarx. Although the lineup had changed, most listeners did not acknowledge a major stylistic shift until much later. In a review of The Trap, For Crying Out Loud describes the sound as "[E]lectro while rough in feeling."

The Trap was released by Zoth Ommog records in Europe. The 12" version, which included only the first three songs, was released under the catalogue number ZOT 25. The CD version, which included all four songs, was released under the catalogue number ZOT 25 CD. All the tracks, except "The Trap (Second Enclosure)" were released again on the compilation CD Four Fit. The Trap was also the first X Marks the Pedwalk release to be recorded in Sevren Ni-Arb's T.G.I.F. studios.

== Track listing ==
1. "The Trap (First Enclosure)" – 5:09
2. "You Are Out" – 3:59
3. "The Trap (Second Enclosure)" – 4:59
4. "Inside" (On CD version only) – 2:47

== Personnel ==
- Sevren Ni-Arb (André Schmechta)
- Raive Yarx (Thorsten Schmechta)
