= Cenotaph (song) =

Song by X Marks the Pedwalk

Single by X Marks the Pedwalk
- Released: 1992
- Recorded: 1992
- Genre: Industrial
- Length: 16:40
- Label: Zoth Ommog
- Producer(s): Sevren Ni-arb (André Schmechta) and AL/X/S

X Marks the Pedwalk singles chronology
"'Abattoir'" (1991)	"Cenotaph" (1992)	"'The Trap'" (1993)

"Cenotaph" is a 1992 song by German industrial band X Marks the Pedwalk. It was released as a stand-alone maxi single by Zoth Ommog in Europe, in LP and CD formats.

== Summary ==
X Marks the Pedwalk released "Cenotaph" through the Zoth Ommog label in 1992. It was released as a maxi single on both LP and CD formats. The single included two other songs, "Never Dare to Ask" and "Helpless", while the CD version featured an additional track, "Seclusion". It is the fourth single by X Marks the Pedwalk, and the fifth by the duo Sevren Ni-Arb and Regan Eracs.

Side-Line magazine gave "Cenotaph" a positive review, writing that the band was beginning to solidify its own sound. Side-Line's review called "Cenotaph" a good follow-up to the previous single "Abattoir", and wrote that it is "a techno nightmare that will from time to time remind you of Skinny Puppy (probably for the voice?), but X-Marks The Pedwalk is becoming in itself a label of quality." German magazines Zillo and Hysterika also gave the single positive reviews.

Like many of the preceding X Marks the Pedwalk singles, the song Cenotaph does not appear on any of the standard full-length releases. It does, however, make appearances on the compilations Four Fit and Experiences, as well as in part of the song "Mi_X Marks the Pedwalk" on Drawback.

== Track listing ==
1. "Cenotaph" – 5:51
2. "Never Dare to Ask" – 3:55
3. "Helpless (Final D.)" – 3:50
4. "Seclusion" (On CD version only) – 3:04

== Personnel ==
- Sevren Ni-Arb
- Regan Eracs (Note: this is the last X Marks the Pedwalk release to feature Regan Eracs.)
