= Meshwork =

Meshwork may refer to:

- Mesh work
- Mesh networking
- Trabecular meshwork, an area of tissue in the eye
- Meshwork (album), 1995 album by German band X Marks the Pedwalk
