= Facer (song) =

Single by X Marks the Pedwalk
- Released: March 27, 1995
- Recorded: 1995
- Genre: Electropop, electro-industrial
- Length: 18:55
- Label: Zoth Ommog
- Songwriter(s): Sevren Ni-Arb
- Producer(s): Sevren Ni-arb (André Schmechta)

X Marks the Pedwalk singles chronology
"'Paranoid Illusions'" (1993)	"Facer" (1995)

Facer is a single by German band X Marks the Pedwalk. It was released by Zoth Ommog in Europe in CD format.

== Summary ==
Facer is notable for marking a new era in the musical style of X Marks the Pedwalk, which became less harsh and incorporated more elements of electronic body music. Both the title track and "Missing Light" are considered by many to be among the best X Marks the Pedwalk songs ever.

== Track listing ==
1. "Facer" – 5:39
2. "Missing Light" – 4:27
3. "Ten Miles" – 4:31
4. "Facer (X-Tremix)" – 4:18

== Personnel ==
- Sevren Ni-arb (André Schmechta)
- Raive Yarx (Thorsten Schmechta)
