= The Killing Had Begun =

Studio album by X Marks the Pedwalk
- Released: 1994
- Recorded: 1994
- Genre: Electro-industrial, EBM
- Length: 51:12
- Label: Zoth Ommog, Cleopatra Records
- Producer: Sevren Ni-arb (André Schmechta)

X Marks the Pedwalk chronology
Human Desolation (1993)	The Killing Had Begun (1994)	Meshwork (1995)

The Killing Had Begun is the third full-length album by German band X Marks the Pedwalk. It was released by Zoth Ommog in Europe as both an LP and CD, and in North America by Cleopatra Records as a CD.

The Killing Had Begun was the first X Marks the Pedwalk album to contain vocals by André Schmechta's wife, Stephanie (who was credited as Estéfania).

== Track listing ==
1. "I Promise You a Murder" – 5:05
2. "Wipe No Tears" – 4:12
3. "Cul-de-Sac" – 4:42
4. "No Premonition" – 5:01
5. "Worthless" – 4:01
6. "Made of Wax" – 4:49
7. "My Back" – 4:19
8. "The Occurrence" – 5:17
9. "Your Eyes" – 6:20
10. "Conversion" – 3:24
11. "Insight" – 4:02

== Personnel ==
- Sevren Ni-arb
- Raive Yarx
- Estefania
