= Retrospective (X Marks the Pedwalk album) =

Retrospective 88-99

Compilation album by X Marks the Pedwalk
- Released: 1999
- Recorded: 1989–1999
- Genre: Industrial
- Length: ??:??
- Label: Memento Materia, Metropolis Records
- Producer: Sevren Ni-arb (André Schmechta), AL/X/S

X Marks the Pedwalk chronology
Four Fit (1995)	Retrospective 88-99 (1999)	Experiences (2004)

Retrospective 88-99 is the name of the third "best-of" album by German industrial music band X Marks the Pedwalk. It was released by Metropolis Records in North America in CD format.

Exclaim! noted about the album, "While some of 'retrospective' sounds dated, like 'Facer', the album is still heavily worthwhile as the cold electronica beats still have dancing rhythms that fit right in with today’s lighter goth dance tunes."

== Track listing ==
1. "Facer" – 5:39
2. "Abattoir (Razormaid Mix)" – 5:54
3. "Drawback" – 6:47
4. "Never Look Back" – 5:46
5. "Monomaniac (Mix)" – 4:58
6. "Maximum Pace" – 6:20
7. "Paranoid Illusions" – 4:09
8. "I Promise You a Murder" – 5:04
9. "Wipe No Tears" – 4:12
10. "Arbitrary Execution" – 5:44
11. "Ten Miles" – 4:30
12. "No Premonition" – 5:04
13. "Look on this Side" – 4:19
14. "Sweep Hand (Timeless)" – 4:35
