= Orange Sector =

German electronic music band

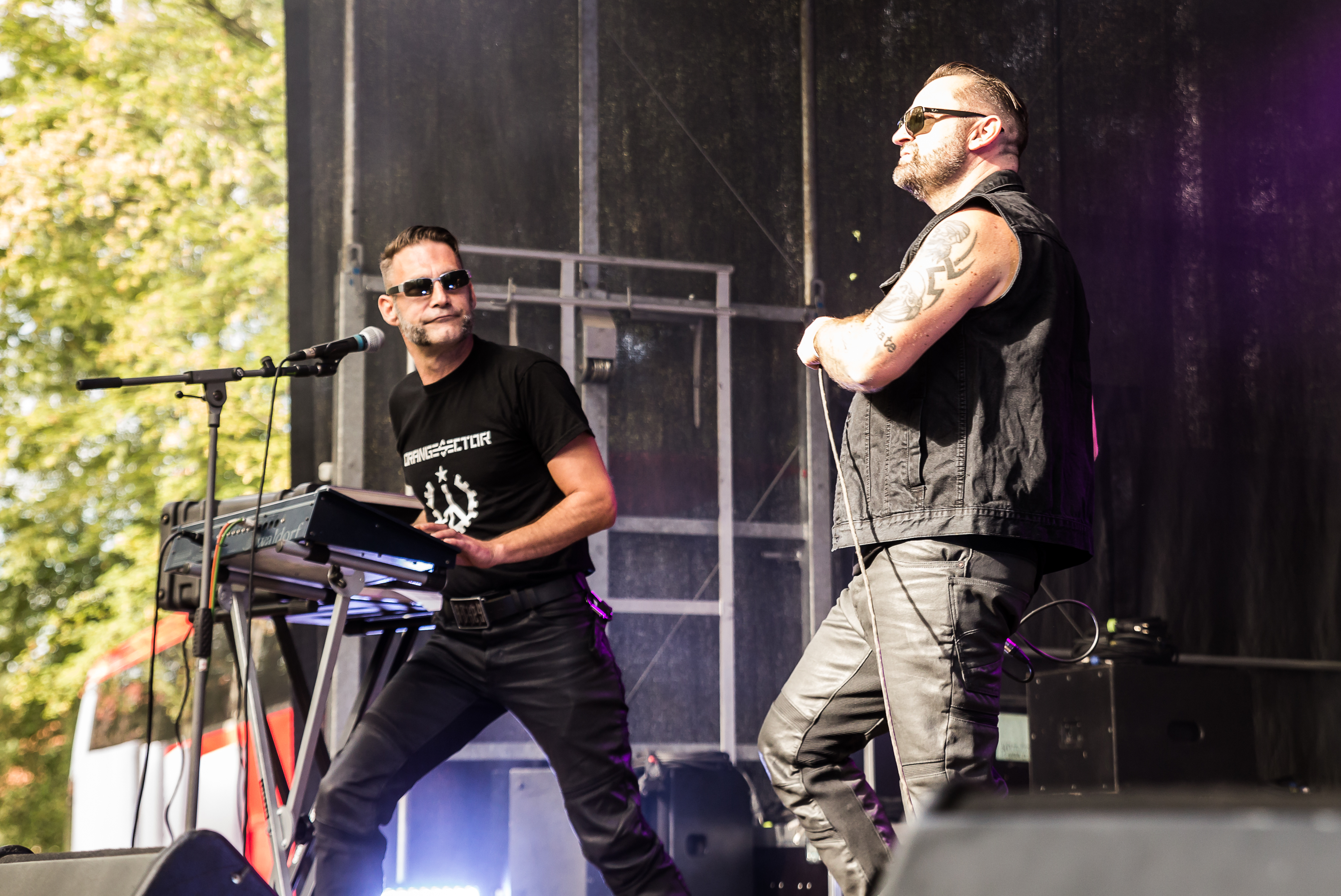
- Orange Sector perform at Nocturnal Culture Night 2018

Background information
- Origin: Hannover, Germany
- Genres: EBM
- Years active: 1992–present
- Labels: Zoth Ommog; Infacted
- Members: Lars Felker; Martin Bodewell; René Nowotny

Orange Sector is a German EBM band from Hannover, Germany, formed in 1992. The band had an initial run with Zoth Ommog Records in the 1990s before taking a hiatus in 1998. In 2004, the band reformed and signed with Infacted Recordings.

== History ==
=== Formation & Zoth Ommog, 1992–1998 ===
Martin Bodewell and Lars Felker met in 1992 at an underground club named "Index" in Hannover, Germany. The pair discovered that they had similar tastes in music and decided to work together in their musical efforts. Influenced by fellow German acts DAF and Extrabreit, as well as EBM stalwarts Nitzer Ebb, the pair produced a demo tape as Orange Sector — entitled The War Comes Home — and sent it to the German electronic music label Zoth Ommog. Zoth Ommog label head Andreas Tomalla, also known as Talla 2XLC, liked the demo and offered a record deal to Bodewell and Felker.

Over the next two years, the band released two albums on Zoth Ommog: Faith in 1993 and Flashback in 1994. Both were produced by André Schmechta (aka Sevren Ni-Arb) of X Marks the Pedwalk in his T.G.I.F. Studio, which was a production nexus for many EBM bands in the early 1990s. The band rounded out 1994 with the release of "Kids in America," an EP that included a cover of Kim Wilde's track of the same name and a cover of the KISS track "I Was Made for Lovin' You."

By 1997, Felker left the band to attend to personal and professional affairs, leaving Bodewell to continue the project alone. Orange Sector released several more albums as a solo venture of Bodewell's: Love It!, which was released on Synthetic Symfony, and Scars of Love and Masquerade, which were released on Zoth Ommog. The style of these albums differed from the initial EBM-heavy output during Felker's involvement and turned away some fans of the earlier work. By the end of the nineties, Bodewell ceased activities as Orange Sector.

=== Rebirth & Infacted Recordings, 2004–present ===
In 2004, Torben Schmidt of Lights of Euphoria and founder of Infacted Recordings contacted Felker with interest in releasing a compendium of early Orange Sector work. This led to the compilation release Here We Are [Back Again] and a regenerated Orange Sector under the Infacted label. Here We Are peaked at #10 on the German Alternative Charts (DAC) and ranked #64 on the DAC Top Singles for 2005.

Under the Infacted banner the band released a stream of new studio albums: Bassprodukt (2006), Profound (2007), and Mindfuck (2009). Clubprodukt, an EP of extracts from Bassprodukt, peaked at #10 on the DAC. In 2010, the band dual-released Krieg & Frieden on both Infacted and on Metropolis Records in the United States, their first release on that label. Twenty years after their debut album, Orange Sector released the maxi-EP "Der Maschinist" as a lead-in to their tenth studio album Vorwärts Nach Weit.

2015 saw the release of Night Terrors and its accompanying EPs, Glasmensch and Monoton. These were followed by renewed touring activity in 2016. Glasmensch and Monoton were the first two parts of an EP "trilogy", the last of which was 2016's Farben.

In 2018 the band brought on René Nowotny as a third member to replace Felker in live support and to provide backing vocals in the studio. Nowotny, also of the band Ad:Key, had previously provided live support for Bodewell after Felker's initial departure. With Nowotny on board, the trio released their twelfth studio album, Alarm, in 2019. Alarm was regarded as the band's most "political" release to date, treating subjects including racism and hateful politics in both German and English.

In 2021, the band co-released a single, "War of the Religions", with former label mates Armageddon Dildos. "War of the Religions" reached #8 on the German Alternative Charts (DAC).

2021 also saw the release of the album Alles Wird Geld. The album track "The Work Is Done" was subsequently released as an EP in 2022 and included a remix by the American band Kreign. "The Work Is Done" reached #2 on the German Alternative Charts (DAC).

In 2024, the band embarked on a second EP trilogy with Tanzfabrik, Wo Bist Du, and Schmerz. Schmerz included a collaboration with Tino Claus of TC75.

=== Side projects ===
In 2022, Bodewell joined Uwe Kanka of Armageddon Dildos to form a side project named Kanka Bodewell. The duo released two albums, Herzblut in 2022 and Stroboscope in 2024.

== Discography ==
=== Albums ===
- The War Comes Home (1992, self-released)
- Faith (1993, Zoth Ommog)
- Flashback (1994, Zoth Ommog)
- Love It! (1997, Synthetic Symfony, Animalized)
- Scars of Love (1998, Zoth Ommog)
- Masquerade (1998, Zoth Ommog)
- Here We Are (Back Again) (2005, Infacted)
- Bassprodukt (2006, Infacted)
- Profound (2007, Infacted)
- Mindfuck (2009, Infacted, Machineries of Joy)
- Krieg & Frieden (2010, Infacted, Metropolis)
- Vorwärts Nach Weit (2013, Infacted)
- Night.Terrors (2015, Infacted)
- Alarm (2019, Infacted)
- Alles Wird Gold (2021, Infacted)
- Feuer & Flamme (2024, Infacted)

=== Singles and EPs ===
- Kids in America (1994, Zoth Ommog)
- Für Immer Kalt Wie Stahl (2006, Infacted)
- Undertage (2008, Infacted)
- Der Maschinist (2012, Infacted)
- Gelle Zeit (2013, Infacted)
- Monoton (2015, Infacted)
- Glasmensch (2015, Infacted)
- Farben (2016, Infacted)
- Stahlwerk (2016, Infacted)
- Die Fahne (2018, Infacted)
- Zerstörer (2020, Infacted)
- War of the Religions (feat. Armageddon Dildos) (2021, Infacted)
- Angstmann (2021, Infacted)
- The Work Is Done (2022, Infacted)
- Join the Nation (2022, Infacted)
- Der Totmacher (2022, Infacted)
- Farben (2024, Infacted)
- Tanzfabrik (2024, Infacted)
- Wo Bist Du (2024, Infacted)
- Schmerz (feat. TC75) (2025, Infacted)
