= Mechanical Horizon =

Studio album by Decoded Feedback
- Released: 2000
- Recorded: 2000
- Genre: Electro-industrial, futurepop
- Length: 55:48
- Label: Bloodline Records, Metropolis Records
- Producer: Decoded Feedback

Decoded Feedback chronology
Reflect in Silence (2000)	Mechanical Horizon (2000)	Phoenix (2002)

Mechanical Horizon is the seventh album by electro-industrial duo Decoded Feedback, the fifth full-length CD, and the first released on Germany's Bloodline record label. The album peaked at #36 on the CMJ RPM Charts in the U.S.

== Track listing ==
1. "Reflect in Silence" – 6:35
2. "Atlantis" – 5:28
3. "Celestia" – 5:57
4. "Dark-Star" – 4:46
5. "Immortal" – 4:57
6. "A Kill to an End" – 5:57
7. "Existence" – 5:12
8. "The Sequel (Cover Version)" – 2:34
9. "Desire" – 5:45
10. "Mechanical Horizon" – 5:22
11. "Fear 2000" – 3:21

== Personnel ==
- Marco Biagiotti
- Yone Dudas
