= Meshwork (album) =

Studio album by X Marks the Pedwalk
- Released: 1995
- Recorded: 1995
- Genre: Synthpop, electro-industrial
- Length: 55:44
- Label: Zoth Ommog, Cleopatra Records
- Producer: Sevren Ni-arb (André Schmechta)

X Marks the Pedwalk chronology
The Killing Had Begun (1994)	Meshwork (1995)	Drawback (1996)

Alternative covers

Meshwork is the name of the fourth album by German band X Marks the Pedwalk. It was released by Zoth Ommog in Europe and Cleopatra Records in North America, both in CD format.

== Summary ==
This album expanded on the stylistic change that had begun with X Marks the Pedwalk's previous stand-alone single, Facer. In an issue of Sideline magazine, André Schmechta commented: "Many fans were not happy with my [X Marks the Pedwalk's] new style! But on the other hand many listeners also rated the new stuf [sic] as the best XMTP work ever...For us the most important thing is to do the music we wanted to do and secondly that the "normal" audience can approach XMTP..."

== Track listing ==
1. "Meshwork M.1" – 5:22
2. "Monomaniac" – 6:19
3. "Free and Alive" – 6:53
4. "Special Sign" – 7:02
5. "Emotion" – 7:14
6. "Never Look Back" – 5:42
7. "T.O.L." – 6:10
8. "N-a-lyse" – 6:22
9. "Meshwork Y.2" – 4:40

== Personnel ==
- Sevren Ni-arb
- Raive Yarx
- Estefania
