= High Speed Digital Spirit Processing =

Studio album by PAX
- Released: 1997
- Recorded: 1997
- Genre: Industrial, techno
- Label: Zoth Ommog
- Producer: Sevren Ni-arb (André Schmechta) and AL/X/S

PAX chronology
Power of Pure Intellect (1995)	High Speed Digital Spirit Processing (1997)	High Speed E.P. (1997)

High Speed Digital Spirit Processing is the second album by PAX, a side project of Sevren Ni-arb from X Marks the Pedwalk and former X Marks the Pedwalk producer AL/X/S. The album peaked at #22 on the CMJ RPM Charts in the U.S.

== Track listing ==
1. "Visual Effect" – 4:12
2. "Tesselated Parts" – 4:16
3. "Tempted Rose" – 6:29
4. "Accolyte" – 6:36
5. "Drip" – 6:29
6. "The Providence" – 6:03
7. "Frozen Landscape" – 4:51
8. "Outfaced!" – 5:28
9. "Antafagosta" – 5:14
10. "Be Prepared" – 5:02
11. "Accolyte (Dark Illumination Remix)" – 7:03
12. "Accolyte (Funker Vogt Remix)" – 4:52
