= Experiences (album) =

Compilation album by X Marks the Pedwalk
- Released: 2003
- Recorded: 1989–1997
- Genre: Electro-industrial
- Label: Dying Culture Records
- Producer: Sevren Ni-arb (André Schmechta), AL/X/S

X Marks the Pedwalk chronology
Retrospective (1999)	Experiences (2003)

Experiences is the name of the fourth and fifth "best-of" albums by German band X Marks the Pedwalk.

== Track listing ==
=== Disk one ===
1. "Bloom"
2. "Maximum Pace"
3. "W.I.T.I.A.K."
4. "Missing Light (Re-edit)"
5. "Special Sign"
6. "Never Look Back (Re-edit)"
7. "Desolation"
8. "Under Glass"
9. "Helpless"
10. "Made of Wax"
11. "Mirthless Knick-Knack"
12. "Ten Miles"
13. "The Trap"
14. "My Back (Out of Order Mix)"
15. "Monomaniac (Mix)"

=== Disc two ===
1. "Hothead"
2. "Sweep Hand"
3. "Drawback"
4. "Missing Light (World Mix)"
5. "Facer"
6. "T.O.L."
7. "Abattoir (Razormaid Mix)"
8. "Cenotaph"
9. "Here I Stay"
10. "Paranoid Illusions"
11. "My Back (Out of Order Mix)"
12. "I Promise You a Murder"
13. "Danger"
14. "Facer (Short Cut)"
15. "Arbitrary Execution"
