= Toy (German band) =

German electronic music band

T.O.Y.
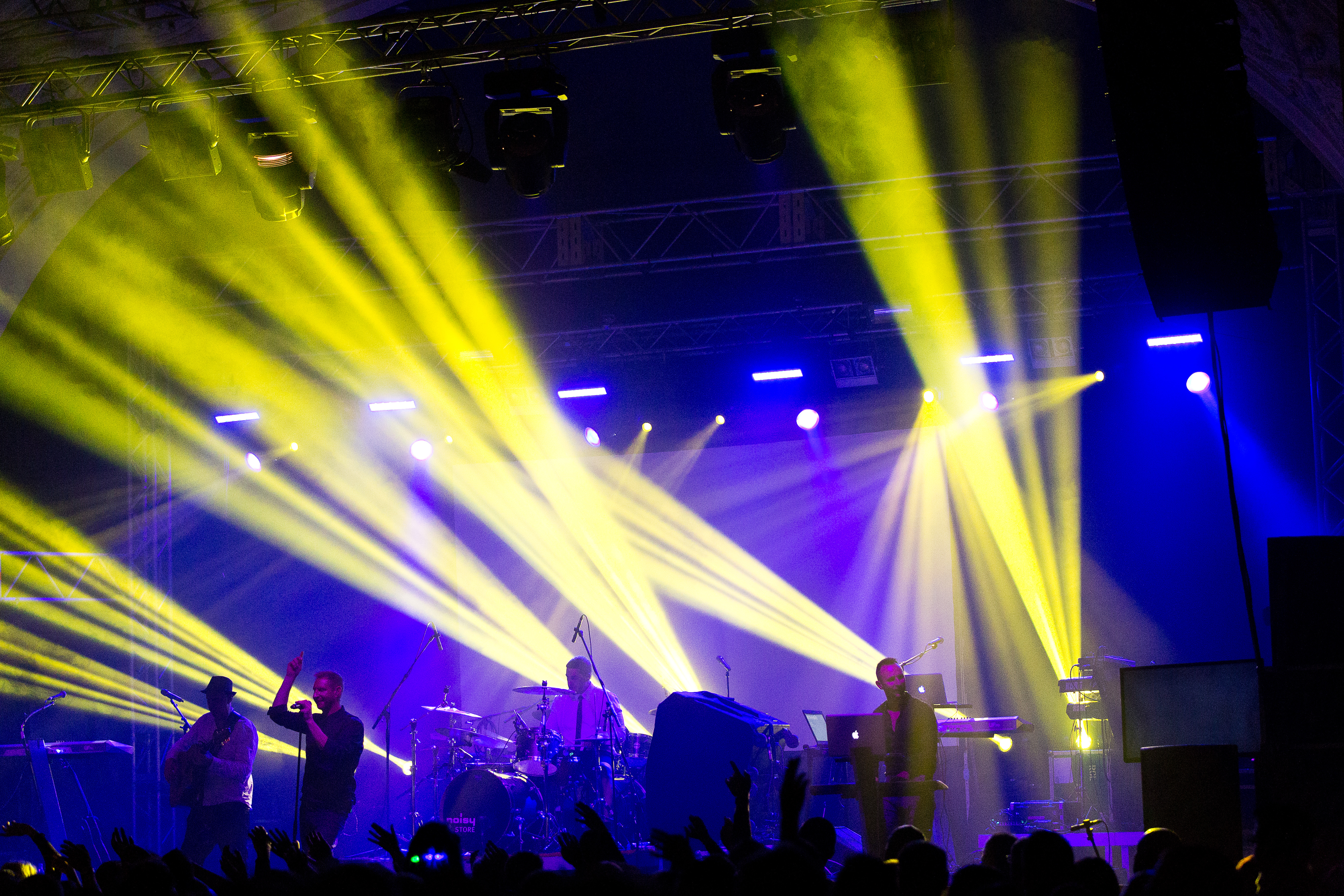
- T.O.Y. at "Gothic meets Klassik" 2015

Background information
- Also known as: Evils Toy
- Origin: Germany
- Genres: Electropop; Futurepop; Synthpop; Dark electro; Electronic body music
- Years active: 1992–present
- Labels: Hypnobeat; Eraser; Drakkar; A Different Drum; Progress Productions; Nordhausen Schallplatten
- Spinoffs: Yavin 4
- Members: Volker Lutz; Helge Wiegand; Marc A. Nathaniel
- Past members: Thorsten Brenda; Cordula K.; Christian "Léo" Leonhardt; Markus Helmert; Oliver Taranczewski
- Website: www.toy-music.info

T.O.Y. (Trademark of Youth) is a German futurepop/synthpop band headed by Volker Lutz. The project originated as electro-industrial band Evils Toy until a change in membership and sound style precipitated the rebranding in the year 2000.

== History ==
=== As Evils Toy ===
Evils Toy started out in 1992 as the project of Volker Lutz and Thorsten Brenda. Thorsten and Volker were introduced by a mutual friend who knew that each of the duo were heavily into industrial music and were already working on music of their own. After completing several tracks together they sent a demo tape to several labels, including the German Hypnobeat label (a sub-label of Hyperium Records) who released their debut album Human Refuse at the end of 1993. Their second full-length release, Morbid Mind, was released a year later and was recorded at André Schmechta's T.G.I.F. Studios, known for recording works by André's project X-Marks the Pedwalk and many other well-known German EBM and industrial bands. This studio collaboration with André also yielded an XMTP remix of "Dear God" that was included on the album and as a standalone CD maxi single.

Their combination of distorted vocals and EBM rhythms with occasional touches of melody proved relatively successful, though their real breakthrough came in 1995 with their "Organics" single, which received significant airplay on both sides of the Atlantic. Organics, and the follow-on album XTC Implant, demonstrated a new sound for the band, integrating a high energy techno style into their typical dark electro that stood apart from their contemporaries at the time. XTC Implant proved to have a lasting and influential effect on the EBM scene.

The Illusion album, released in 1997, was the last album by this act that might accurately be defined as "industrial". Angels Only!, released the following year, moved away from distorted vocals and towards a more synthpop style. This was the first Evils Toy recording to feature Oliver Taranczewski, as well as the last recorded with Thorsten Brenda. For background vocals and live keyboards Volker brought in his long-time girlfriend Cordula K, who also appears in the videos for "Virtual State" and "Dream With Me".

The addition of Taranczewski to the band in 1997 brought with him lyrical inspiration from the stories of H. P. Lovecraft to infuse into the band's sci-fi ethic. Lyrics on several tracks on Angels Only! — "Back On Earth," "From Above Comes Sleep," and "Colours Out Of Space" — drew directly from Lovecraftian themes of the Great Old Ones, R'lyeh, and the text The Colour Out of Space respectively. Taranczewski continued to weave these themes into the remaining Evils Toy releases and into early T.O.Y. songs as well.

The album Silvertears was released on E-Wave Records (with distribution through BMG) in 2000 and was the last release under the name Evils Toy. The project was known as "T.O.Y." thereafter.

=== As T.O.Y. ===
In 2001 the band renamed then released their first album, Space Radio, through E-Wave/BMG. That year they toured with De/Vision for 28 dates across Europe. Their second album under the new name, White Lights, continued the "softer" tone of the previous album.

The band have produced many remixes for other bands like Apoptygma Berzerk, In Strict Confidence, De/Vision and !Bang Elektronika. Volker also used his SonicStage Recording Studios to record and produce works by bands such as And One, L'Âme Immortelle, and Funker Vogt.

In 2004 Volker made a song for the German radio play The three investigators song contest. Also in 2004, the computer game company Konami used a song produced by T.O.Y. on the PS2 & Xbox release Dance Dance Revolution Ultramix 2. The track was a remix of the DDR and Beatmania IIDX song "I Feel..." by game music composer, Akira Yamaoka. Bands like Neuropa, Echo Image, Alien#Six13 and Midihead also contributed to the soundtrack.

In 2005 Taranczewski released an album with Stephan Voigt of the band Plastic under the name Yavin 4, an album sounding more like the older Evils Toy releases mixed with modern dance and drum & bass elements. He also produced the Cruciform Injection album Aftermath that was released in 2006.

In May 2009 Taranczewski left the band for good. Volker said he would finish the album, entitled Pain is Love, on his own. After Taranczewski's departure, Markus Helmert and Christian "Léo" Leonhardt joined Volker, playing keyboards and drums, respectively.

In September 2014, Helmert quit the band for health reasons. About the same time, Taranczewski re-joined the band as a keyboardist, while Leonhardt was replaced by Marc A. Nathaniel on drums. The new lineup continued to work on finishing the long delayed album, Pain is Love, as well playing live gigs.

In March 2017 Taranczewski again left the band for personal reasons. Helge Wiegand, a songwriter from Cologne and also keyboard player and vocalist of the band Diorama, joined the band in April 2017. That Summer the album Pain is Love was finally released. Later that year the band headlined the XV Synthetic Snow Festival in Moscow, Russia.

In 2019, T.O.Y. released a two-track single, "Silent Soldiers", on the Swedish Progress Productions label. Videos were filmed for the tracks by director Rytis Titas on location in Lithuania and were inspired by the aesthetics of the series Stranger Things.

In 2022, T.O.Y. released the single "Turn On!" featuring vocals from Marian Gold of Alphaville. The single reached #1 on the German Alternative Charts (DAC).

== Members ==
- Volker Lutz (vocals, arrangements, programming, producer).
- Helge Wiegand (keyboards, vocals)
- Marc A. Nathaniel (drums).

== Previous members ==
- Thorsten Brenda (keyboards).
- Cordula K. (vocals, keyboards).
- Christian "Léo" Leonhardt (drums).
- Markus Helmert (keyboards).
- Oliver Taranczewski (lyrics, keyboards)

== Discography ==
=== As Evils Toy ===
Title	Album details
Human Refuse	Released: 1993 (reissued 1995, 2001); Label: Hypnobeat (reissued Metropolis, Sonicstage); Formats: CD
Dear God (Remix)	Released: 1994; Label: Hypnobeat; Formats: CD Maxi
Morbid Mind	Released: 1994 (reissued 1996); Label: Hypnobeat (reissued Metropolis); Formats: CD
Organics	Released: 1995; Label: Hypnobeat; Formats: CD Maxi
The Old Race	Released: 1996; Label: Hypnobeat; Formats: CD Maxi, Ltd.
XTC Implant	Released: 1996; Label: Hypnobeat, Metropolis; Formats: CD
Evils Toy Box	Released: 1997; Label: Hypnobeat; Formats: CD, Ltd. Edition Metal Box
Illusion	Released: 1997; Label: Metropolis, Eraser; Formats: CD
Angels Only!	Released: 1998; Label: Metropolis, Eraser; Formats: CD
Transparent Frequencies	Released: 1998; Label: Eraser; Formats: CD Maxi
Silvertears	Released: 2000; Label: E-Wave Records; Formats: CD
Virtual State	Released: 2000; Label: E-Wave Records; Formats: CD Maxi
Evilution: The Best of Evils Toy	Released: 2002; Label: Sonicstage; Formats: CD Enhanced

=== Compilation appearances (as Evils Toy) ===
Year	Compilation	Label	Track
1994	Body Rapture Vol. 3	Zoth Ommog	Track #9 "Make Up"
1994	We Came to Dance Vol. V	Sub Terranean	Track #14 "Third World War"
1995	Diva Performance 10th Anniversary	Cinemanyx	Track #4 "Sacred (Diva Mix '95)"
1995	Hypnobeats	Hypnobeat	Track #5 "Make Up"
1995	Moonraker Vol. II	Sub Terranean	Disc #1, Track #14 "Make Up"
1995	There Is No Time	Ras Dva Records	Disc #4, Track #13 "Dear God"
1995	We Came to Dance – Indie Dancefloor Vol. VII	Sub Terranean	Track #5 "Dear God"
1996	Belle Epoque – Romantic Wave Episodes	Sub Terranean	Track #15 "Lonely"
1996	Hypnobeats 2	Hypnobeat	Track #1 "Organics"
1996	Sound-Line Vol. 4	Side-Line	Track #5 "Home"
1996	The Digital Space Between Vol. 3	Cleopatra	Track #11 "Dear God (X Marks the Pedwalk Remix)"
1996	The Gothic Compilation Part 5	Gothic Records (Germany)	Track #5 "Home"
1997	Alternative	Nova Tekk	Track #7 "Prevision"
1997	German Mystic Sound Sampler Volume VI	Zillo	Track #10 "The Old Race"
1997	Moonraker Vol. 3	Sub Terranean	Disc #1, Track #4 "Dizzy Divination"
1997	Virtual X-mas 97	Energy Records	Track #5 "Virtual X-mas 97"
1997	We Came to Dance – Indie Dancefloor Vol. 10	Sub Terranean	Disc #2, Track #9 "Organics"
1998	Best of Electronic Music	TCM Musikproduktionsgesellschaft mbH	Disc #1, Track #11 "Transparent Frequencies"
1998	Cyberl@b	Nuclear Blast	Disc #2, Track #7 "Lucifer's Garden"
1998	Deejay Tribe	Credo	Disc #2, Track #11 "Transparent Frequencies"
1998	Electrocity Level X	Ausfahrt	Track #8 "Lucifer's Garden"
1998	Electropolis: Volume 1	Metropolis	Track #12 "Organics (Slow Motion Mix)"
1998	Hypnotic & Hypersonic	Hyperium Records	Disc #2, Track #3 "Organics (Remix)"
1998	Innovation Eins	Credo, Nova Tekk	Track #6 "Motionless"
1998	Moonraker Vol. IV	Sub Terranean	Disc #1, Track #2 "Co-Existence"
1998	Sauna – Våren 1998	Sauna Magazine	Track #2 "Motionless"
1998	Sender Rio Presents Rock and Wave	Credo	Disc #1, Track #1 "Fallen Angel"
1998	Stage 1	Schwarzrock	Track #1 "Co-Existence"
1998	We Came to Dance – Indie Dancefloor Vol. 11	Sub Terranean	Disc #2, Track #4 "Lucifers Garden (Remix)"
1998	We Came To Watch Part 1	Credo	Video #5 "Co-Existence"
1999	Body Rapture 7	Zoth Ommog	Disc #1, Track #3 "In Silence (Album Mix)"
1999	Body Rapture 8	Zoth Ommog	Disc #1, Track #5 "Co-Existence"
1999	Cover Classics Volume One	VISION Records	Track #9 "In The Army Now"
1999	Deejay Tribe 2	Credo	Disc #1, Track #6 "Angels Only! – Beyond"
1999	Electro Club Attack – Shot One	XXC	Disc #1, Track #11 "Angles Only! > Beyond"
1999	Electro Club Attack – Shot Two	XXC, Zoomshot Media Entertainment	Disc #2, Track #6 "Lucifer's Garden (Remix)"
1999	Electro Mania	Zoth Ommog	Track #5 "Mad Modern Dream"
1999	Memobeat – An Electro Industrial Compilation	Memento Materia	Track #3 "Transparent Frequencies"
1999	The Electronic Challenge Vol. 3	COP International	Track #6 "Transparent Frequencies (Klupp Miks)"
2000	Gothic Compilation Part XI	Betbeliever Releases	Track #5 "Rainbow vs. Stars"
2001	Electro Club Attack – The Classix I	XXC	Disc #1, Track #3 "Make Up"
2003	DJ Revelation 01 (Compiled By L'Âme Immortelle)	Angelstar	Track #8 "Make Up"
2003	Tonedeaf Records Presents: Vinyl Conflict No. 1	ToneDeaf Records	Track #2 "Space Radio"
2005	Synth & Wave Essentials	ZYX Music	Track #19 "Virtual State"

=== As T.O.Y. ===
Title	Album details
Space Radio	Released: 2001 (reissued 2004); Label: E-Wave Records, XIII BIS Records (reissued Art Music Group); Formats: CD
Fairytale	Released: 2003; Label: A Different Drum; Formats: CD single
White Lights	Released: 2003; Label: A Different Drum; Formats: CD
White Lights (Fan Edition)	Released: 2003; Label: E-Wave Records; Formats: 2xCD
Pain is Love	Released: 2017; Label: Nordhausen Schallplatten; Formats: CD / Vinyl / Download
The Darkness & The Light	Released: 2017; Label: Nordhausen Schallplatten; Formats: CD single / 12" / Download
Silent Soldiers	Released: 2019; Label: Progress Productions; Formats: CD single / Download
Turn On!	Released: 2022; Label: Closing the Circle; Formats: 12" single / Download

=== Compilation appearances (as T.O.Y) ===
Year	Compilation	Label	Track
2001	Club Bizarre 2	Angelstar	Disc #1, Track #8 "Welcome to Spaceradio"
2001	Strange Love 5	Orkus	Track #1 "Strange Modern Art"
2002	Advanced Electronics	Synthetic Symphony	Disc #1, Track #6 "Loner (Remix)"
2002	Dark Decryption – The Electro Remix Selection Vol. 02	XXC	Disc #1, Track #14 "Dream With Me (Massiv in Mensch Remix)"
2002	Synth & Wave Essentials	ZYX Music	Disc #2, Track #4 "We Are Electric"
2002	Zillo Dark Summer – Best of Goth Open Airs 2002	Zillo	Disc #1, Track #7 "Dream With Me (Fairlage Mix)"
2003	Gothic Compilation Part XX	Batbeliever Releases	Track #10, "Long Distance Ride"
2003	Orkus Compilation VII	Orkus	Track #3 "Long Distance Ride"
2003	Sonic Seducer Cold Hands Seduction Vol. 28	Sonic Seducer	Track #1 "Long Distance Ride"
2003	Stromschlag Volume 1	Electro Shock Records	Track #7 "Dream With Me (Massiv In Mensch-Remix)"
2004	Listen to the Future	A Different Drum	Track #2 "Color Matching"
2004	Synthpop Club Anthems 3	A Different Drum	Track #6 "Another Lovesong (Trance Mix By Massiv In Mensch)"
2004	The Collector's Set of Dark Electronic	E-Wave Records	Disc #3 Tracks #1-#14
2005	Synth & Wave Essentials Vol. 2	ZYX Music	Disc #1, Track #2 "Do Dreams Bleed (Memphis Mix)"
2006	DDR Festival & Dance Dance Revolution Strike Original Soundtrack	Toshiba EMI Ltd	Disc #1, Track #42 "I Feel... (T.O.Y. Remix)"
