= Inner Zone Journey =

Studio album by X Marks the Pedwalk
- Released: 2010
- Genre: Synthpop, electro-industrial

X Marks the Pedwalk chronology
Drawback (1996)	Inner Zone Journey (2010)

Inner Zone Journey is a 2010 album released by X Marks the Pedwalk.

== Reception ==
Professional ratings
Review scores
Source	Rating
SideLine News	positive

SideLine News called Inner Zone Journey "a cool album" and called "Seventeen" "the absolute masterpiece."

== Track listing ==
1. "Lifeline" - 5:20
2. "Runaway" - 4:37
3. "Obscure Reason" - 5:13
4. "Satellite" - 4:01
5. "Seventeen" - 4:58
6. "Winter Comes Tomorrow" - 4:43
7. "Human Scientists" - 4:47
8. "Clean Hearts" - 6:06
9. "Stripped By Tears" - 4:41
10. "Snapshots In A Dark Room" - 6:49
11. "Distant Rain" - 3:10
