= Drawback (album) =

Studio album by X Marks the Pedwalk
- Released: 1996
- Recorded: 1996
- Genre: Synthpop, electro-industrial
- Length: 67:49
- Label: Zoth Ommog, Metropolis Records
- Producer: Sevren Ni-arb (André Schmechta)

X Marks the Pedwalk chronology
Meshwork (1995)	Drawback (1996)	Inner Zone Journey (2010)

Drawback is the name of the fifth album by German band X Marks the Pedwalk. It was released by Zoth Ommog in Europe and Metropolis Records in North America, both in CD format.

== Summary ==
This album expanded on the stylistic change that was evident with X Marks the Pedwalk's previous release, Meshwork. According to frontman André Schmechta, Drawback is his favorite X Marks the Pedwalk release.

Regarding the cover and inside art, Schmechta has said: "And do not ask me about helicopters!! I do not know what they could have to do with "Drawback"?! When I showed the sleeve to Estefania I asked her the same question and she laughed saying: 'Helicopters can be very fast...like time can be!'" The themes of time and its passage are recurring motifs in the lyrics of the songs on Drawback.

Drawback was released in Europe under the Zoth Ommog catalogue number ZOT 196, and in North America under the Metropolis Records catalogue number MET 076.

== Track listing ==
1. "Time Tunnel (Phase One)" – 1:39
2. "Maximum Pace" – 6:21
3. "W.I.T.I.A.K. (What I Taste is a Kiss)" – 5:06
4. "Turn of the Tide (Ebb Tide Mix)" – 4:23
5. "Time Tunnel (Phase Two)" – 3:41
6. "Sweep Hand" – 4:55
7. "The Past" – 5:06
8. "Turn Of The Tide" – 6:03
9. "Drawback" – 6:49
10. "Sweep Hand (Timeless 8.0)" – 4:33
11. "Clip the Lines" – 6:29
12. "Mi_X Marks the Pedwalk" – 12:36

== Personnel ==
- Sevren Ni-arb
- Raive Yarx
- Estefania

All words and music on Drawback were written by André Schmechta, under the name Sevren Ni-arb. All songs were performed by André and Thorsten Schmechta, under the names Sevren Ni-arb and Raive Yarx, respectively. Female vocals on "W.I.T.I.A.K.", "Drawback", and "Clip the Lines" performed by Stephanie Schmechta (as Estefania). Drawback was recorded and mixed at T.G.I.F. studios in Germany.
