= Re-edit =

In popular music, a re-edit is an altered version of a recorded song created by repeating, reordering, or removing sections of the original recording - for example, making a chorus repeat several times in a row, or extending the length of a break section. Like remixes, re-edits are especially common in dance music.

== See also ==
- Audio editing
