= Lights of Euphoria =

German music group

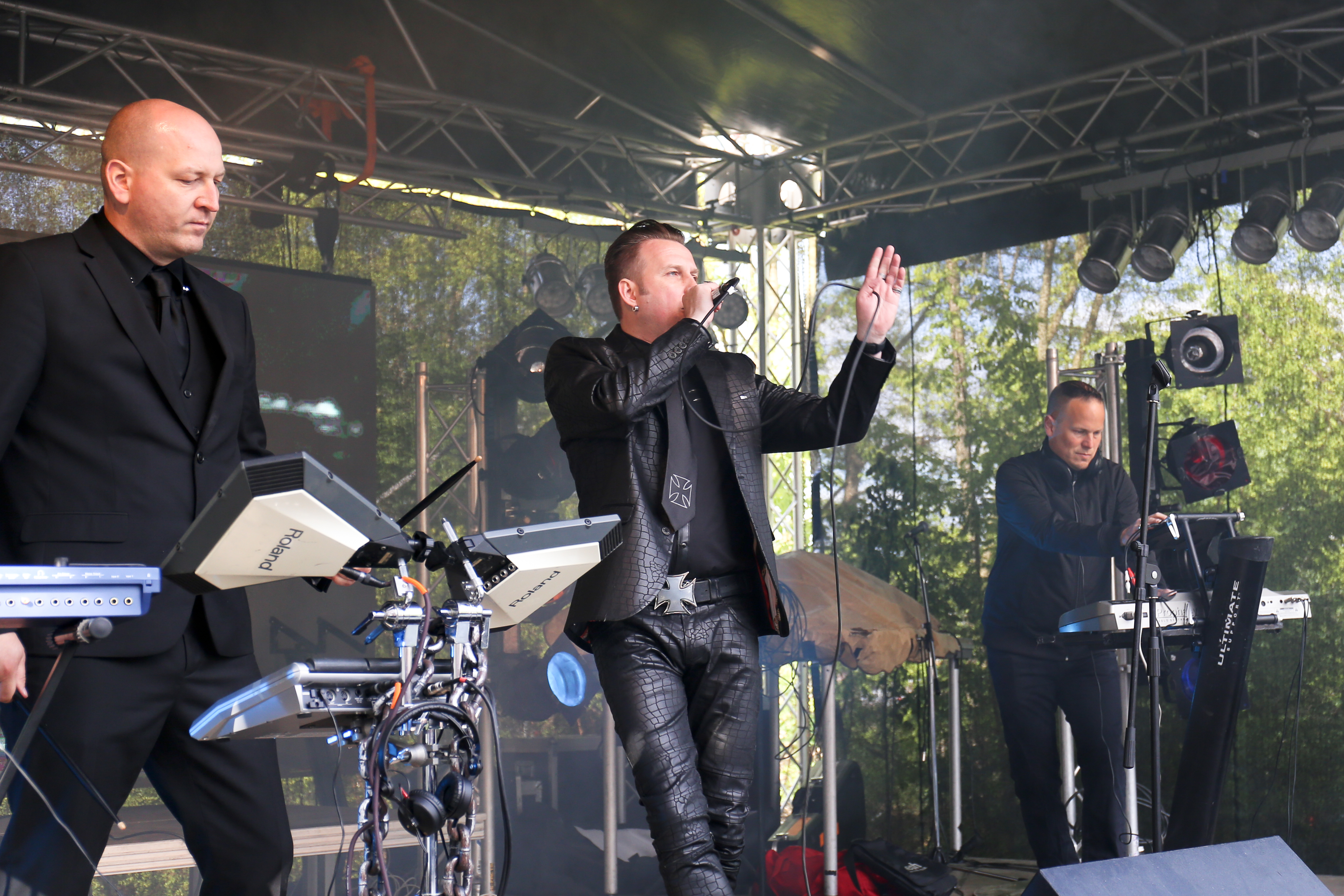
- At the Wave-Gotik-Treffen 2016

Background information
- Genres: Aggrotech; Futurepop; Electro-Industrial
- Years active: 1992–present
- Labels: Accession; Bloodline; Zoth Ommog
- Members: Torben Schmidt (instruments); Jimmy Machon (vocals)

Lights of Euphoria is a music group from Germany. The group was originally intended as a single-song project, but remained together after the success of their first song, "Subjection".

== Discography ==
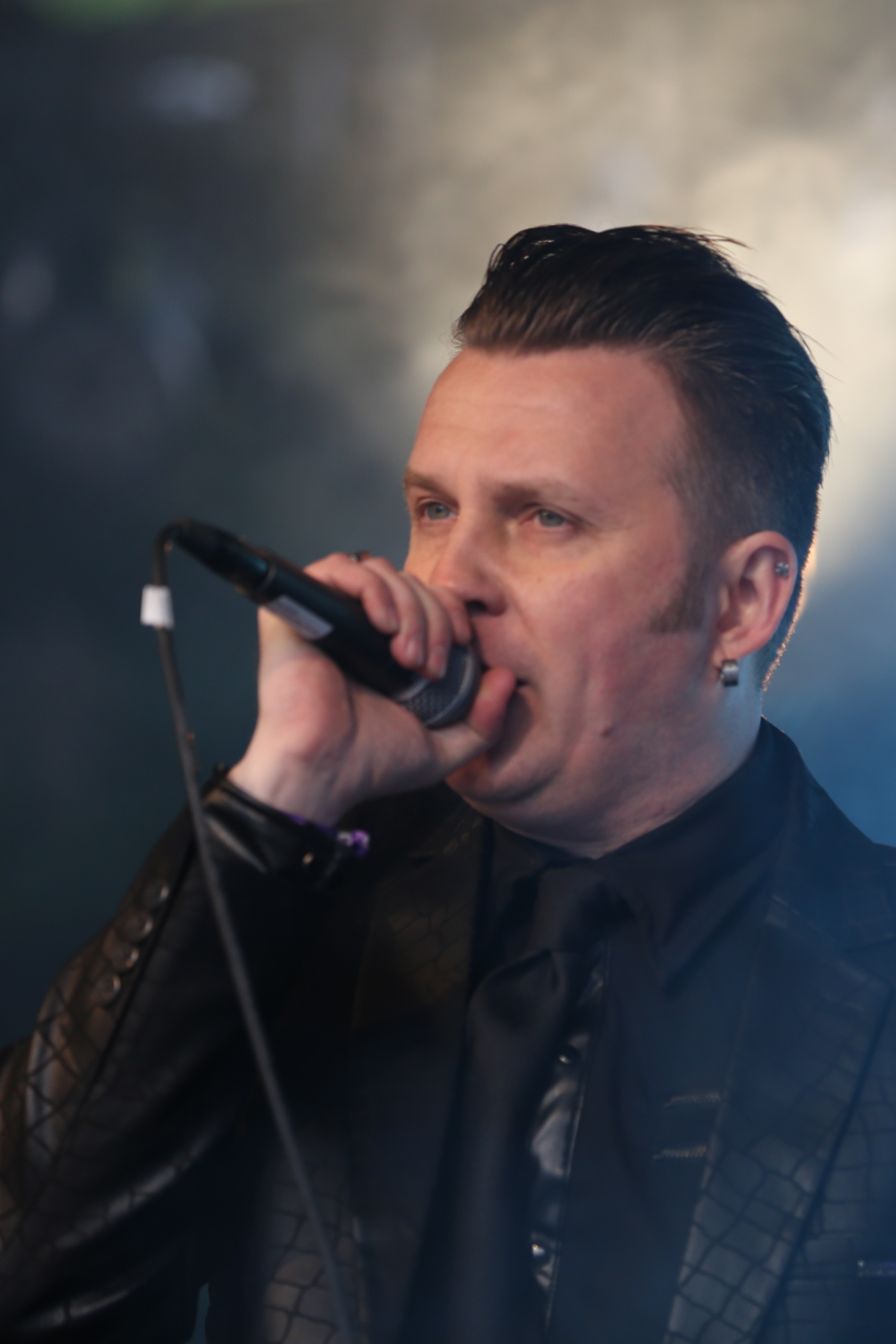
Jimmy Machon

Albums

- 1995 - Brainstorm (CD)
- 1995 - Thoughtmachine (CD)
- 1996 - Beyond Subconsciousness (CD)
- 1997 - Fahrenheit (CD) - released in the US under the name "Blood Brothers"
- 1998 - Voices (CD)
- 2003 - Krieg Gegen die Maschinen (CD)
- 2004 - Gegen Den Strom (CD)
- 2016 - Traumatized (CD)
- 2020 - Altered Voices (CD)
- 2022 - Angels (CD)
- 2022 - Suicidal (CD)

Singles:

- 1994 - Violent World (MCD)
- 2001 - Fortuneteller (MCD)
- 2003 - Fading Moments (EP)
- 2003 - True Life (MCD)
- 2004 - One Nation (MCD)
- 2005 - Sleepwalk (The Awakening) (MCD)
- 2012 - Schwarze Sonne
- 2022 - Access Denied
- 2022 - Collapsed
- 2022 - Emotional
- 2022 - Here Comes the Rain
- 2022 - Man and Machine
- 2022 - Puppeteer
- 2022 - Saviour - The Second Coming
- 2023 - Euphoric Light
- 2024 - Surrender

Compilations:

- 2004 - Querschnitt (CD)
- 2012 - Subjection
