= Human Desolation =

Studio album by X Marks the Pedwalk
- Released: 1993
- Recorded: 1993
- Genre: Electro-industrial
- Length: 50:33
- Label: Zoth Ommog, Cleopatra Records
- Producer: Sevren Ni-arb (André Schmechta)

X Marks the Pedwalk chronology
Freaks (1992)	Human Desolation (1993)	The Killing Had Begun (1994)

Alternative covers
- Cleopatra Records' version

Human Desolation is the second full-length album by the German band X Marks the Pedwalk. It was released by Zoth Ommog in Europe as both an LP and a CD, and in North America by Cleopatra Records as a CD.

According to André Schmechta, Human Desolation is X Marks the Pedwalk's best-selling release.

== Track listing ==
1. "I See You" – 3:48
2. "The Relapse" – 3:40
3. "Desolation" – 7:08
4. "Repulsion" – 6:14
5. "Criminal Disharmony" – 3:55
6. "Paranoid Illusions" – 4:10
7. "Experience" – 6:22
8. "The Trap" – 4:29
9. "Taciturnity" – 2:52
10. "...Call You..." – 4:05
11. "Don't Fall Asleep" – 3:47

== Personnel ==
- Sevren Ni-arb
- Raive Yarx

The music and lyrics on Human Desolation were written by André Schmechta (also known as Sevren Ni-arb) and performed by both André and Thorsten Schmechta (a.k.a. Raive Yarx). Human Desolation was recorded and mixed at T.G.I.F. studios in Germany.
