= Zoth Ommog Records =

German record label

- Parent company: Music Research
- Founded: 1989
- Founder: Andreas Tomalla
- Defunct: 2000
- Status: Inactive
- Distributors: Semaphore, Connected
- Genre: Electronic music, industrial
- Country of origin: Germany
- Location: Frankfurt, Hesse, Germany

Zoth Ommog Records was a German record label that focused on Industrial music and was owned by parent label Music Research. The company was established by German music producer Andreas Tomalla (aka Talla 2XLC) in 1989 and later handed over to producer Torben Schmidt of the band Lights of Euphoria. The label released albums for such bands as Leæther Strip, X Marks the Pedwalk, Bigod 20, Lights of Euphoria and Klinik between 1989 and 1999.

The company based its name on the fictional character Zoth-Ommog in the Cthulhu Mythos.

In the United States, many of the Zoth Ommog artists were released in the US under Cleopatra Records and Metropolis Records.

== Discography ==
Cat #	Artist	Title	Format
ZOTH 001	Pankow	Kunst Und Wahnsinn	12"
ZOTH 002	Noise Control	My Fight	12"
ZOTH 003	Consolidated	Consolidated!	12"
ZOTH 004	Aircrash Bureau	Exhibition	12"
ZOTH 005	X Marks the Pedwalk	Arbitrary Execution	12"
ZOTH 006	Leæther Strip	Japanese Bodies	12"
Z PRO 1	Consolidated	Message to the People	12" Promo
ZOT 07/ZOT 07 CD	Armageddon Dildos	East West	12", CD Single, Promo
ZOT 08 CD	Brigade Werther	To Be Continued...	CD Single
ZOT 09/ZOT 09 CD	Leæther Strip	Aspects of Aggression	12", CD Single
ZOT 10/ZOT 10 CD	Consolidated	Dysfunctional	12", CD Single
ZOT 11	X Marks the Pedwalk	Danger	12"
ZOT 11 CD	X Marks the Pedwalk	Disease Control	CD Single
ZOT 12/ZOT 12 CD	Bigod 20	The Bog	12", CD Single
ZOT 13 CD/ZOT 13 EP	Leæther Strip	Science for the Satanic Citizen	CD, LP
ZOT 14/ZOT 14 CD	Armageddon Dildos	Never Mind/Pressure	12", CD Single
ZOT 15/ZOT 15 CD	X Marks the Pedwalk	Abattoir	12", CD Single
ZOT 16/ZOT 16 CD	Klute	Explicit	12", CD EP
ZOT 17/ZOT 17 CD	Shift	Electrofixx	12", CD Single
ZOT 18/ZOT 18 CD	Leæther Strip	Object V	12", CD
ZOT 19/ZOT 19 CD	Armageddon Dildos	Resist	12", CD
ZOT 20/ZOT 20 CD	X Marks the Pedwalk	Cenotaph	12", CD Single
ZOT 21/ZOT 21 CD	A-Head	Deep Down	12", CD Single
ZOT 22/ZOT 22 CD	Psychopomps	Godshit	12", CD Single
ZOT 23/ZOT 23 CD	Armageddon Dildos	Homicidal Maniac	12", CD Single
ZOT 24/ZOT 24 CD	Bigod 20	On the Run	12", CD Single
ZOT 25/ZOT 25 CD	X Marks the Pedwalk	The Trap	12", CD Single
ZOT 26/ZOT 26 CD	Leæther Strip	Material	12", CD EP
ZOT 27 CD	HeadCrash	Scapegoat	CD
ZOT 28 CD	X Marks the Pedwalk	Paranoid Illusions	CD
ZOT CD 02, ZOT LP 02	Consolidated	The Myth of Rock	CD, LP
ZOT CD 03/ZOT LP 03	V/A	Body Rapture	CD, LP
ZOT CD 04/ZOT LP 04	Armageddon Dildos	That's Armageddon	CD, LP
ZOT CD 05/ZOT LP 05	X Marks the Pedwalk	Freaks	CD, LP
ZOT CD 06/ZOT LP 06	Psychopomps	Assassins DK United	CD, LP
ZOT CD 07	V/A	Body Rapture II	CD
ZOT CD 08/ZOT LP 08	Leæther Strip	Solitary Confinement	CD, LP
ZOT CD 09	Blok 57	Blok 57	CD
ZOT CD 10	Ringtailed Snorter	Revealing Obstacles	CD
ZOT CD 11	Yeht Mae	Anatomy	CD
ZOT CD 12	Klute	Excluded	CD
ZOT CD 13	Bigod 20	Steel Works!	CD
ZOT CD 14	X Marks the Pedwalk	Human Desolation	CD
ZOT CD 15	Mentallo & The Fixer	Revelations 23	CD
ZOT CD 16	Psychopomps	Pro-Death Ravers	CD
ZOT CD 17	Armageddon Dildos	Homicidal Dolls	CD
ZOT CD 18	Orange Sector	Faith	CD
ZOT CD 19	Ringtailed Snorter	Sexual Child Abuse	CD
ZOT CD 100	V/A	Zoth In Your Mind	CD
ZOT LP 01	Leæther Strip	The Pleasure of Penetration	LP
ZOT LP 02	Consolidated	The Myth of Rock	LP
ZOT LP 03	V/A	Body Rapture	LP
ZOT LP 04	Armageddon Dildos	That's Armageddon	LP
ZOT LP 05	X Marks the Pedwalk	Freaks	LP
ZOT LP 06	Psychopomps	Assassins DK United	LP
ZOT LP 08	Leæther Strip	Solitary Confinement	LP
CD ZOT 101	Blok 57	Mean Machine	CD EP
CD ZOT 102	Bigod 20	It's Up To You	CD EP
CD ZOT 103	Leæther Strip	Underneath the Laughter	CD
CD ZOT 104	Armageddon Dildos	Fear	CD
CD ZOT 105	Spahn Ranch	Collateral	CD
CD ZOT 106	Yeht Mae	Transmitter	CD
CD ZOT 107	X Marks The Pedwalk	The Killing Had Begun	CD
CD ZOT 108	Mentallo & The Fixer	Where Angels Fear to Tread	CD
CD ZOT 109	Orange Sector	Flashback	CD
CD ZOT 110	V/A	Body Rapture Vol. 3	CD
CD ZOT 111	V/A	Body Rapture Vol. 4	CD
CD ZOT 112	Violet Arcana	In the Scene of the Mind	CD
CD ZOT 113	Artefakto	Des-Construccion	CD
CD ZOT 114	Leæther Strip	Serenade for the Dead	CD
CD ZOT 115	Armageddon Dildos	07 104	CD
CD ZOT 116	Spahn Ranch	Breath and Taxes	CD
CD ZOT 117	Mainesthai	Out to Lunch	CD
CD ZOT 118	X Marks the Pedwalk	Air Back Trax	CD
CD ZOT 119	Mentallo & The Fixer	Meets Mainesthai	CD
CD ZOT 120	Leæther Strip	Positive Depression	CD
CD ZOT 121	V/A	The Colours of Zoth Ommog	CD
CD ZOT 122	Bigod 20	Supercute	CD
CD ZOT 123	Bigod 20	One	CD Single
CD ZOT 124	Armageddon Dildos	Too Far to Suicide	CD Single
CD ZOT 125	Armageddon Dildos	Lost	CD
CD ZOT 126	Orange Sector	Kids in America	CD EP
CD ZOT 127	Violet Arcana	Serenity	CD EP
CD ZOT 128	Zero Defects	Durability	CD Single
CD ZOT 129	Zero Defects	Non Recycleable	CD
CD ZOT 130	V/A	Body Rapture Vol. 5	CD
CD ZOT 131	Synæsthesia	Embody	CD
CD ZOT 132	Penal Colony	Multicoloured Shades	CD
CD ZOT 133	Psychopomps	Six Six Six Nights in Hell	CD
CD ZOT 134	44 X ES	Banish Silence	CD
CD ZOT 135	Penal Colony	Shadows in Blue	CD EP
CD ZOT 136	V/A	AP: The Contest	CD
CD ZOT 137	Lights of Euphoria	Brainstorm	CD
CD ZOT 138	Armageddon Dildos	Unite	CD Single
CD ZOT 139	X Marks the Pedwalk	Facer	CD Single
CD ZOT 140	Synæsthesia	Desideratum	2xCD
CD ZOT 141	Blok 57	Animals on Speed	CD
CD ZOT 142	1 AM	1000 Beats	CD Single
CD ZOT 143	Klinik	To the Knife	CD
CD ZOT 144	Zero Defects	Thoughtographic	CD EP
CD ZOT 145	Leæther Strip	Legacy of Hate and Lust	CD
CD ZOT 146	Klute	Excel	CD EP
CD ZOT 148	Klinik	Stitch	CD
CD ZOT 149	V/A	Best of EBM & Electro Vol. 1	CD
CD ZOT 150	V/A	Best of Zoth Ommog Vol. 1	2xCD
CD ZOT 151	X Marks the Pedwalk	Meshwork	CD
CD ZOT 152	Lights of Euphoria	Beyond Subconsciousness	CD
CD ZOT 153	Leæther Strip	Best of Leæther Strip	CD
CD ZOT 154	In Strict Confidence	Cryogenix	CD
CD ZOT 155	V/A	Industrial X-perience	CD
CD ZOT 156	V/A	Body Rapture Vol. 6	CD
CD ZOT 157	Edera	Ambiguous	CD
CD ZOT 158	X-Act	No Matter	CD
CD ZOT 159	Collapsed System	Berlin 2007	CD
CD ZOT 160	V/A	Strange World	CD
CD ZOT 161	Leæther Strip	The Rebirth of Agony	CD
CD ZOT 162	Second Disease	Flame the Dark True	CD
CD ZOT 163	Birmingham 6	Error of Judgement	CD
CD ZOT 164	Funker Vogt	Thanks for Nothing	CD
CD ZOT 165	Pax	The Power of Pure Intellect	CD
CD ZOT 166	Bio-Tek	A God Ignored is a Demon Born	CD
CD ZOT 167	Snog	The Future	CD
CD ZOT 168	Zero Defects	Komma	CD
CD ZOT 169	Leæther Strip	Yes - I'm Limited Vol. II	CD, Ltd. Edition
CD ZOT 170	Funker Vogt	Words of Power	CD Single
CD ZOT 171	Decoded Feedback	Technophoby	CD
CD ZOT 172	V/A	Body Rapture 7	2xCD
CD ZOT 173	Seven Trees	Embracing the Unknown	CD
CD ZOT 174	Trylok	Contrast	CD
CD ZOT 175	X-Act	Barrel of a Gun	CD Single
CD ZOT 176	Equatronic	Shadowland	CD
CD ZOT 177	In Strict Confidence	Collapse	CD
CD ZOT 178	Leæther Strip	Self-Inflicted	CD
CD ZOT 179	V/A	Zoth Ommog Presents A Tribute To	CD
CD ZOT 180	Synæsthesia	Ephemeral	CD
CD ZOT 181	Godheads	Ordinary Swoon	CD
CD ZOT 182	Infam	To Die For	CD
CD ZOT 183	V/A	The History Files - Volume One	CD
CD ZOT 184	Necrofix	Nefarious Somnabulance	CD
CD ZOT 185	Lights of Euphoria	Fahrenheit	CD
CD ZOT 186	Mentallo & The Fixer	... There's No Air to Breathe	CD
CD ZOT 187	Bio-Tek	Darkness My Name Is	CD
CD ZOT 188	Birmingham 6	You Cannot Walk Here	CD EP
CD ZOT 189	Front Line Assembly	The Initial Command	CD
CD ZOT 190	Dark Illumination	Realize the Error	CD
CD ZOT 191	V/A	Bodyhorst's Popshow	CD
CD ZOT 192	Funker Vogt	Take Care!	CD Single
CD ZOT 193	E.C.M.	Ambivalence	CD
CD ZOT 194	Allied Vision	Unburied	CD
CD ZOT 195	Good Courage	Guilty On All Accounts (Rust 5)	CD
CD ZOT 196	X Marks the Pedwalk	Drawback	CD
CD ZOT 197	Orange Sector	Scars of Love	CD
CD ZOT 198	Controlled Fusion	Incubation Time	CD
CD ZOT 199	Funker Vogt	We Came to Kill	CD
CD ZOT 200	V/A	Something for Your Mind	CD, Ltd. Edition
CD ZOT 201	Fusspils 11	Gib Ihr Einen Namen	CD
CD ZOT 202	U-Tek	Goldene Zeit 1989-1993	CD
CD ZOT 203	Cleen	Designed Memories	CD
CD ZOT 204	In Strict Confidence	Face the Fear	CD, CD Ltd. Box Set
CD ZOT 205	Leæther Strip	Anal Cabaret: A Tribute to Soft Cell	CD EP
CD ZOT 206	Psychopomps	Fiction Non Fiction	CD
CD ZOT 207	Internal	Dysfunctional Subconscious	CD
CD ZOT 208	V/A	Body Rapture 8	2xCD
CD ZOT 209	Ravenous	No Retreat and No Surrender	CD
CD ZOT 210	Orange Sector	Masquerade	CD
CD ZOT 211	Funker Vogt	Killing Time Again	CD Single
CD ZOT 212	Infam	I Tried But Failed 1988-1994	CD
CD ZOT 213	Matter of Fact	Infacted	CD
CD ZOT 214	Equinox	Holon	CD
CD ZOT 215	Mentallo & The Fixer	No Further Rest for the Wicked	2xCD
CD ZOT 216	Front Line Assembly	The Singles: Four Fit	CD
CD ZOT 217	Dark Illumination	Pathfinder	CD
CD ZOT 218	Equatronic	Motivation	CD
CD ZOT 219	Fictional	Fictitious	CD
CD ZOT 220	Decoded Feedback	Bio-Vital	CD
CD ZOT 221	Melotron	Mörderwerk	CD
CD ZOT 222	Funker Vogt	Tragic Hero	CD Single
CD ZOT 223	Abscess	Punishment & Crippled Reality	CD
CD ZOT 224	Lights of Euphoria	Voices	CD
CD ZOT 225/225L/225XL	Funker Vogt	Execution Tracks	CD, CD Ltd. Edition, CD Ltd. Fan Edition
CD ZOT 226	Melotron	Dein Meister	CD Single
CD ZOT 227	In Strict Confidence	Industrial Love/Prediction	2xCD
CD ZOT 228	Leæther Strip	Yes, I'm Limited Vol. III	2xCD Ltd. Edition
CD ZOT 229	Birmingham 6	Mixed Judgements	CD
CD ZOT 230	Aghast View	Carcinopest	CD
CD ZOT 231	Front 242	Headhunter 2000 - Part 1.0	CD Single
CD ZOT 231P	Front 242	Headhunter 2000	CD Single Promo
CD ZOT 232	Front 242	Headhunter 2000 - Part 2.0	CD Single
CD ZOT 233	Front 242	Headhunter 2000 - Part 3.0	CD Single
CD ZOT 234	Front 242	Headhunter 2000 - Part 4.0	CD Single
CD ZOT 235	Numb	Language of Silence	CD
CD ZOT 236	Cleen	Second Path	CD
CD ZOT 237	Pax	High Speed Digital Spirit Processing	CD
CD ZOT 238	V/A	10 Years of Zoth Ommog	CD Ltd. Edition
CD ZOT 239	V/A	The History Files Volume Two	CD
CD ZOT 240	Melotron	Der Blaue Planet	CD Single
CD ZOT 241	V/A	Funker Vogt Tour-CD '98	CD EP
CD ZOT 242/242-X	Front 242	RE:BOOT-Live	CD Ltd. Edition
MD ZOT 242	Front 242	[:Re:Boot:(L.IV.E.]	Minidisc
CD ZOT 243	Imperative Reaction	Eulogy for the Sick Child	CD
CD ZOT 244	Negative Format	Result of a New Culture	CD
CD ZOT 245	Leæther Strip	Serenade for the Dead	2xCD
CD ZOT 246	Front Line Assembly	Prophecy	CD Single
CD ZOT 247	Front Line Assembly	Implode	CD
CD ZOT 249	V/A	Electro Mania	CD
CD ZOT 250	Decoded Feedback	EVOlution	CD
CD ZOT 251	Armageddon Dildos	Re:Match	CD
CD ZOT 252	Armageddon Dildos	East West 2000	CD Single
CD ZOT 253	[Peak]	Zero	CD
CD ZOT 254	Ravenous	Silverray	CD Single
CD ZOT 255	Melotron	DJ Traum	CD Single
CD ZOT 256	Melotron	Kindertraum V1.0	CD Single
CD ZOT 257	Front Line Assembly	Fatalist	CD Single
CD ZOT 258	X-Act	3	CD
CD ZOT 259	Strategy	Assignment	CD
CD ZOT 260	Shock of Reality	Abysmal Devotion	CD
CD ZOT 261	Sub/Zero	Illusion	CD Single
PCD ZOT 098	V/A	Colourized Vol. 1 - Cyber Rave & Hard Floor Metal	CD EP Promo
PCD ZOT 099	V/A	Zoth Ommog Megamix	CD Promo
PCD ZOT 103	Leæther Strip	Underneath The Laughter	CD EP Promo
PCD ZOT 118	X Marks the Pedwalk	Air Back Trax	CD Promo
PCD ZOT 120	Leæther Strip	Positive Depression	CD Single Promo
PCD ZOT 121	V/A	The Colours of Zoth Ommog	CD Promo
PCD ZOT 122	Bigod 20	Supercute	CD Promo
PCD ZOT 125	Armageddon Dildos	Lost	CD Promo
PCD ZOT 126	Orange Sector	Kids in America	CD EP Promo
PCD ZOT 129	Zero Defects	Non Recycleable	CD Promo
PCD ZOT 133	Psychopomps	Six Six Six Nights in Hell	CD Promo
PCD ZOT 137	Lights of Euphoria	Brainstorm	CD Promo
PCD ZOT 139	X Marks the Pedwalk	Facer	CD EP Promo
PCD ZOT 143	Klinik	To the Knife	CD Promo
PCD ZOT 145	Leæther Strip	Legacy of Hate and Lust	CD Promo
PCD ZOT 9910	V/A	10 Years of Zoth Ommog - Special Anniversary Mixes	CD Promo
ZOT 6 PROMO	Birmingham 6	Error of Judgement'	12" EP Promo
7" ZOT 177	In Strict Confidence	Dementia	7" Ltd. Edition
PMD ZOT 1997-2	V/A	POPkomm Promotional MiniDisc Alternative	Minidisc Promo
Vinyl ZOT 242	Front 242	Re:Boot Live	2xLP

== See also ==
- List of record labels
- Category:Zoth Ommog Records artists
