= Armageddon Dildos =

German electronic music band

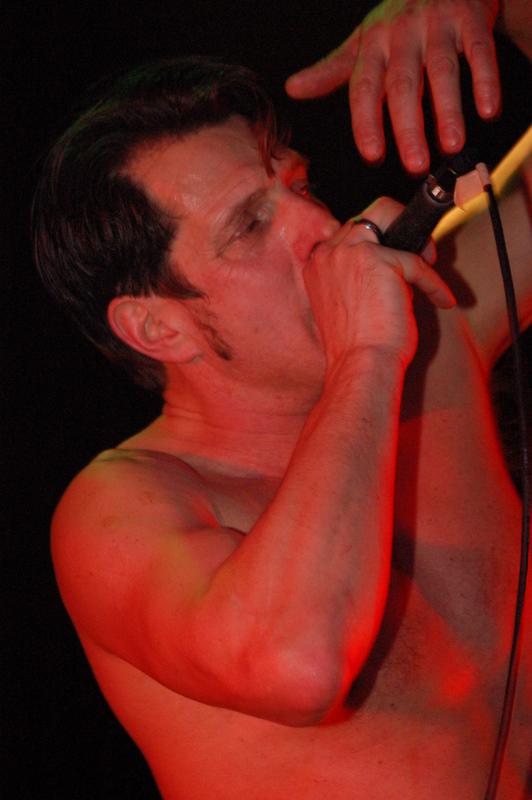
- Armageddon Dildos live

Background information
- Origin: Kassel, Germany
- Genres: Post-industrial; EBM
- Years active: 1988-present
- Labels: Zoth Ommog; BMG; Ausfahrt; Sire
- Members: Uwe Kanka; Rene Nowotny; Ulf Häusgen
- Past members: Dirk Krause

Armageddon Dildos is a German electro-industrial-duo originally consisting of Uwe Kanka (vocals) and Dirk Krause (synthesizer). The act was formed in 1988 in Kassel Germany, and the name comes from the slang term for intercontinental ballistic missiles. They perform songs in both German and English.

The Armageddon Dildos have been popular within their native Germany. Outside of Germany they have a cult following among industrial music lovers. In the United States their music has had some airtime on experimental music radio stations. They have been compared to bands like Rammstein, Front 242, Nitzer Ebb, Ministry, Revolting Cocks, Einstürzende Neubauten, and Coil.

== History ==
Uwe Kanka and Dirk Krause met in 1986 in Kassel, Germany, at a shared rehearsal space where Krause was working with a synthpop band and Kanka was with a new wave band called Beat The Beat. Uwe had self-taught to play guitar and Dirk studied piano at a music college. The pair rented an apartment and began to play music together, formalizing as a band by December 1988. It soon became clear that the duo wanted to work together on music that was more electronic and aggressive, which eventually led them to Music Research and Talla 2XLC (Andreas Tomalla). Armageddon Dildos were one of the first acts on the Music research imprint Zoth Ommog Records, alongside other significant acts such as Leæther Strip, X Marks the Pedwalk, and Tomalla's own band, Bigod 20.

In 1990, the band released their first single, "East West," followed in 1991 by their first album That's Armageddon. These were followed by album singles "Never Mind" and "Resist." After the release of "Resist", the band embarked on a European tour through Germany and Sweden, with additional dates in Spain, Hungary, and the U.S. In 1993, the band released the single "Homicidal Maniac" which added a layer of guitar to their otherwise all-electronic sound.

Prior to 1993, Tomalla's band Bigod 20 had scored a hit with the track "The Bog," which led to a major label deal with Sire Records. In 1993, Tomalla used this relationship to arrange a deal with Sire for Armageddon Dildos. Sire released "Homicidal Maniac" in the US as a prelude to their next album Homicidal Dolls.

In 1994, the band covered fellow Sire artist Morrissey's "Everyday Is Like Sunday," released as the maxi-single, Come Armageddon. The cover was suggested by the label as a tongue-in-cheek take on the song's lyric, "come, armageddon, come."

By this point, the band had toured across Europe, including Germany, Hungary, Sweden, Spain, Holland, Italy, and France, and two shows in the US at the New Music Seminar in New York City.

In May 1994, the band went to Chicago to record the album Lost with producer Keith "Fluffy" Auerbach. The album featured guitar work by Skatenigs guitarist Mat Mitchell and percussion by Felix Miklik of Hip Deep Trilogy and Drag. Commenting on the Chicago recording session, Kanka said "we got what we came for, an American sound." The album made an appearance on the CMJ RPM charts, peaking at #21. Lost and the album single "Too Far To Suicide" would be the band's last releases on Sire.

The band released a couple of singles, "Unite" and "We Are What We Are," before landing a deal with Bertelsmann Music Group in 1997. Under BMG, the group released a new album, Speed, and two singles, produced by Andy Gill and mixed by Bob Kraushaar. For "Unite" and Speed, the band brought on UK drummer Steve "Vom" Ritchie, former member of Doctor and the Medics. The duo closed out the 1990s with the album Re:Match and a remix maxi of "East West" as Eastwest 2000, both released by Zoth Ommog.

In 2000, Krause left the group leaving Kanka to continue on his own. In the early 2000s, Kanka released a pair of Armageddon Dildos albums on Ausfahrt/Electric Blue, Morgengrauen in 2003 and Sangreal in 2005.

In April 2007 the band embarked on a US tour, marking the band's first live dates in North America in more than a decade.

In 2011, Armageddon Dildos signed with Alfa Matrix and released their first album in six years: Untergrund. On Untergrund, Kanka worked with producer Mattias Black, as well as musicians Rene Nowotny and Ulf Häusgen and Kanka's daughter Denise (aka Malin) on guest vocals.

After several more years, the band released the single "Herbstzeitlose" in 2018, followed by the single "Heut Nacht" and album Dystopia in 2020.

In 2021, the band joined former label mates, Orange Sector, to co-release a single, "War of the Religions". "War of the Religions" reached #8 on the German Alternative Charts (DAC).

In 2022, Kanka joined with Martin Bodewell of Orange Sector to form a side project named Kanka Bodewell. The duo released two albums, Herzblut in 2022 and Stroboscope in 2024.

== Discography ==
=== Albums ===
- That’s Armageddon – (CD Album) 1991 - Zoth Ommog
- Homicidal Dolls – (CD Album) 1993 - Zoth Ommog, Sire Records
- Lost – (CD Album) 1994 - Zoth Ommog • (CD) 1995 - Sire Records
- 07 104 – (CD Compilation) 1994 - Zoth Ommog, Semaphore
- Speed – (CD Album) 1997 - BMG, RCA
- Re:Match – (CD Album) 1999 - Zoth Ommog
- Morgengrauen – (CD Album) 2003 - Electric Blue
- Sangreal – (CD Album) 2005 - Ausfahrt
- Untergrund – (CD Album) 2011 - Alfa Matrix
- Dystopia – (CD Album) 2020 - Alfa Matrix

=== Singles & EPs ===
- East West – (12") 1990 - Zoth Ommog
- Never Mind/Pressure – (12") 1990 - Zoth Ommog
- Resist – (12") 1991 - Zoth Ommog
- Homicidal Maniac – (12", CD Maxi) 1992 - Zoth Ommog • (12", CD Maxi) 1993 - Sire Records
- Fear – (CD EP) 1993 - Zoth Ommog
- Come Armageddon – (12", CD Maxi) 1994 - Sire Records
- Too Far To Suicide – (CD Maxi) 1994 Zoth Ommog • (CS Single) 1995 - Sire Records
- Unite – (CD Maxi) 1995 - Zoth Ommog
- We Are What We Are – (12", CD Single) 1996 - Metronome
- Blue Light – (CD Maxi) 1997 - RCA
- Open Up Your Eyes – (CD Maxi) 1997 - BMG Ariola Hamburg GmbH, RCA
- Eastwest 2000 – (CD Maxi) 1999 - Zoth Ommog
- Herbstzeitlose – (Digital) 2018 - Alfa Matrix
- Heut Nacht – (Digital) 2020 - Alfa Matrix

=== Compilation appearances ===
- Body Rapture – 1990 - "Raise Your Head" - Zoth Ommog
- Metropolis 00.01 – 1990 - "East West (Metropolis Mix)" - Metropolis (defunct DJ label)
- Technopolis 2 – 1990 - "East West (Metropolis Mix)" - New Zone
- Technopolis 3 – 1991 - "Resist (Demonstrate Mix)" - New Zone
- The World of Techno – 1991 - "Never Mind" - Intercord Tonträger GmbH
- The World of Techno Compilation – 1991 - "Never Mind" - Blow Up
- Twitch Recordings Volume 3 – 1991 - "Resist (Remix Mike Wertheim)" - Twitch Recordings
- For Crying Out Loud Chapter 2 – 1992 - "Resist" and Track #2 "Sex For Money" - FCOL
- The World of Techno Vol. 2 – 1992 - "Frontline of Violence" - Intercord Tonträger GmbH
- The World of Techno Volume 2 – 1992 - "Frontline of Violence" - Blow Up
- Zoth In Your Mind – 1993 - "Homicidal Maniac (Crash Head Mix)" - Zoth Ommog
- A Matter of Taste - Intercord PopKomm Compilation 1994 – 1994 - "Too Far To Suicide (Radio Edit)" - Intercord Tonträger GmbH
- Art & Dance 5 – 1994 - "The Hunter" - Gothic Arts Records/Lost Paradise
- Moonraker – 1994 - "Homicidal Maniac (Video Mix)" - Sub Terranean
- The Colours of Zoth Ommog – 1994 - "I Can't Remember" - Zoth Ommog
- Totentanz - The Best of Zoth Ommog – 1994 - "Resist (Lard Mix)" and "Frontline of Violence" - Cleopatra
- We Came to Dance - Indie Dancefloor Vol. IV – 1994 - "The Hunter" - Sub Terranean
- Alternative Final Mix 11 – 1995 - "Too Far To Suicide" - Warner Music (Australia)
- Best Of Zoth Ommog Vol. 1 – 1995 - "East West" and "Never Mind" - Zoth Ommog
- Colourized Vol. 1 - Cyber Rave & Hard Floor Metal – 1995 - "Unite (Remix)" - Zoth Ommog
- E-Beat – 1995 - "Unite" - Polymedia Marketing Group GmbH
- Demolition Zoth – 1996 - "East West Edit" - Cleopatra
- Guitars & Machines Vol. 2 – 1996 - "In My Mind (Like A Knife)" - Blanco Y Negro
- Sounds Of 96 Vol. 3 – 1996 - "We Are What We Are" - Musikexpress
- The Digital Space Between Vol. 3 – 1996 - "Uncle D." - Cleopatra
- GötterDÄmmerung – 1997 - "Ich Weiß Nicht (Ob Es Liebe Ist...)" - Gringo Records, Intercord Tonträger GmbH
- Off Road Tracks Vol. 5 – 1997 - "Guilty" - Metal Hammer (Germany)
- The History Files - Volume One – 1997 - "East West (Dildo Effect Mix)", "In My Mind (Like A Knife...)", "East West (Airplay Mix)" and "Z.O.D." - Zoth Ommog
- Totentanz Vol. II - The History of Zoth Ommog – 1997 - "East West" and "Never Mind" - Zoth Ommog
- German Classics Electrobeats – 1998 - "Haut (Krupps Mix)" - TCM Musikproduktionsgesellschaft mbH
- 10 Years of Zoth Ommog – 1999 - "Never Mind (New 99 Version)" and "Never Mind (Original Version) - Zoth Ommog
- Bodyhorst's Popshow 3 – 1999 - "In My Mind (2000 Remix)" - Bodystyler Magazine
- Cover Classics Volume One – 1999 - "Everyday Is Like Sunday" - Synthetic Symphony
- Electrocity Vol. 12 – 1999 - "Resist 2000" - Ausfahrt
- Music Research Promotional CD Pop.komm '99 Zoth Ommog – 1999 - "2000 In My Mind" - Zoth Ommog
- Straight Shooter (Original Soundtrack) – 1999 - "Straight Shooter" - EastWest Records GmbH
- The Complete History of Zoth Ommog: Totentanz – 1999 - "Frontline of Violence" and "Godshit (Re-Possessed Relievo Version)" - Cleopatra
- We Came to Watch Part 2 – 1999 - "Homicidal Maniac" - Credo, Nova Tekk
- ZilloScope: New Signs & Sounds 07-08/99 – 1999 - "In My Mind (Version 2000)" - Zillo
- Cyberl@b V2.0 – 2000 - "In My Mind 2000" - Matrix Cube
- N.O.D. The Final Sessions – 2000 - "Resist" - Energy Network
- Cyberl@b V.4.0 – 2003 - "Traurige Nation" - Alfa Matrix
- Sonic Seducer Cold Hands Seduction Vol. 28 – 2003 - "Morgengrauen" - Sonic Seducer
- Electrocity XIII – 2003 - "Morgengrauen" - Ausfahrt
- Bright Lights, Dark Room: Depeche Mode Tribute – 2006 - "Dangerous" - Cryonica Music
- XX-Ray – 2008 - Appearing as 'Sara Noxx Feat. Armageddon Dildos', "Your Face In My Brain" - Prussia Records
