= X Marks the Pedwalk =

German band

- Origin: Germany
- Genres: Trance; Progressive trance; Electro-industrial; Electronic body music; Futurepop; Techno
- Years active: 1987–1998, 2003, 2009–present
- Labels: Zoth Ommog; Cleopatra; Metropolis; Infacted Recordings; Meshwork
- Spinoff of: Scarecrow
- Members: Sevren Ni-Arb; Estefania (1994–present)
- Past members: Regan Eracs (1987–1992); Raive Yarx (1992–2010)
- Website: www.meshwork-music.com/project/x-marks-the-pedwalk/

X Marks the Pedwalk (sometimes written as X-Marks the Pedwalk) is a German band whose styles range from post-industrial dance to electronic body music. X Marks the Pedwalk's influence in the industrial and electronic music scenes was considerable during the 1990s, as they were one of the first and most popular acts from the now defunct record label, Zoth Ommog.

== History ==
X Marks the Pedwalk – initially named "Scarecrow" – was founded by Sevren Ni-Arb (born André Schmechta, May 13, 1969) in 1987. Schmechta, who did the writing, production, and engineering of all X Marks the Pedwalk tracks, was the only consistent member throughout X Marks the Pedwalk's history.

Schmechta, a classically trained musician, became interested in synthesizers at an early age, and found himself part of several bands after he was able to buy his first keyboard at the age of 16. At that time, with influences such as Skinny Puppy, Kraftwerk, and DAF, Schmechta started a band called Scarecrow with his school-mate Regan Eracs (born Jörg Böhme). Schmechta was also impacted by records from artists such as Fad Gadget, OMD, and Yazoo.

Shortly after releasing their first single on the Techno Drome International label, 1988's "Black Door", the members of Scarecrow were offered to sign to German DJ Talla 2XLC's new record label, Zoth Ommog. The project name was changed to X Marks the Pedwalk to avoid any legal troubles over using the name "Scarecrow." The new band name came from a reference in the Stephen King novel, Dance Macabre, to a horror-story by the science-fiction author Fritz Leiber named "X-Marks The Pedwalk."

The first X Marks the Pedwalk concert was performed in Wiesbaden, Germany on December 16, 1989, where they opened for industrial music artists Vomito Negro. Most live material at that time came from their then just-released single "Arbitrary Execution" (1989), and the previously released Scarecrow single "Black Door".

In 1990, the group produced a series of singles and EPs: "Abattoir", "Danger", and Disease Control. The next year they released their first full-length album, Freaks.

Their first tour throughout Germany began after the release of Freaks, with an additional concert being played in Budapest, Hungary. Three subsequent concert tours throughout Germany occurred again after the release of "Cenotaph", Human Desolation, and The Killing Had Begun. With few exceptions, these live shows took place in Germany. X Marks the Pedwalk was a band that consisted of two members at a time, therefore, they never performed completely "live," but relied heavily on the incorporation of DAT playback. This was complemented with "live overdubs, drum-effects, lead-melodies, [and] atmospheres...", with André on lead vocals.

After the release of the single "Cenotaph", Böhme left the band in 1992 to pursue other interests, and Schmechta enlisted the help of his brother Raive Yarx (born Thorsten Schmechta, June 14, 1971). Also in 1992, Schmechta built T.G.I.F. Studios (an acronym for "Thank God It's Friday!"). T.G.I.F. formed the production nexus not only for X Marks the Pedwalk and related projects, but for many other Zoth Ommog bands including Armageddon Dildos and Evils Toy.

Despite the membership change, X Marks the Pedwalk's musical style did not change drastically during the Schmechta brothers' first two efforts together: Human Desolation, released in 1993, and The Killing Had Begun in 1994. For The Killing Had Begun, Schmechta experimented with vocal treatments on the track "Insight" from his future wife, Estefania (born Stefanie Eckmann, March 21, 1969), who then became a vocalist for X Marks as well as for other of Schmechta's side projects. 1994 also saw the release of the retrospective compilation Airbacktrax simultaneously in Europe on Zoth Ommog and in America on Cleopatra.

"Maximum Pace", from Drawback (0:46, 730KB)
From X Marks the Pedwalk's final release before their 2010 revival; "Maximum Pace" is often voted the best X Marks the Pedwalk song of all time.

1995's single, "Facer", introduced a combination of "techno-dance" and electro-industrial styles. The next two X Marks the Pedwalk albums, Meshwork (1995) and Drawback (1997), built on this new style and received favorable reactions by many fans within Europe, and thanks to the latter's release by Metropolis Records, helped build an extended fanbase in North America. The change in musical direction beginning with Meshwork is seen as having split the band's fanbase with a sound that deviated from strict industrial/EBM and presaged the development of the Futurepop genre.

By 1998, André Schmechta put aside his work on X Marks the Pedwalk (along with his multitude of side-projects) to concentrate on his family and career, including selling off his T.G.I.F. Studios in 1999. During the hiatus, Schmechta became a business owner, share-holder and managing partner of two companies, and took time to raise his two children from his marriage with Eckmann.

During the band's hiatus, two compilations of previously released material were produced: Retrospective 88–99 on the Memento Materia label in 1999, and Experiences on Dying Culture in 2003. Infacted Recordings also produced a set of re-releases with additional material in 2009 and 2010.

The band's hiatus ended in 2010 with the release of Inner Zone Journey, the first of several albums to be released on the Infacted Recordings label. Inner Zone Journey was followed by The Sun, The Cold And My Underwater Fear in 2012 and with The House Of Rain in 2015.

In 2016, André launched his own electronic music label, Meshwork Music, named after the band's 1995 album. The label released X Marks the Pedwalk's next three albums — Secrets, Transformation, and New / End — as well as releases by new projects by André and others.

=== Side projects ===
Throughout the course of X Marks the Pedwalk's history, André Schmechta especially formed or joined several side projects as a creative outlet for music that had a different sound than X Marks the Pedwalk. This is a list and short description of some of the other ventures taken upon by members of X Marks the Pedwalk.

PAX was a project that was created as the result of a working relationship between André Schmechta and Heiko Daniel. Schmechta, who was producing an album for Daniel, felt that they had "something fascinating, easy, emotional and outstanding." From this, two albums and an EP were born.

Ringtailed Snorter was a solo-project by André Schmechta, the first song of which was written as a tribute to a friend who had died. Ringtailed Snorter differs from X Marks the Pedwalk in its use of "clean structures" and "minimal soundscapes to leave more [space in] the minds of the audience."

Hyperdex-1-Sect was a one-time collaboration between André and Stefanie Schmechta and Jonathan Sharp of the project New Mind. Their release features remixes by the artists' main projects (X Marks the Pedwalk and New Mind, respectively), as well as a remix by cEvin Key's project, Download.

U-Tek saw the coming together of Alexis Schaar (also known as AL/X/S, former producer for X Marks the Pedwalk) and André Schmechta to form a project that combined Alexis's dance and club music background with Schmechta's EBM background. The duo's second project, A-Head focused less on this interaction and more on creating alternative electro music.

Deluga was a darkwave project by Thorsten Schmechta, Stefanie Schmechta, and Falk Aupers. The project never got past the first demo stage.

SN-A is a solo project of André's launched in 2012. The name is a combination of letters that stands for Sevren Ni-Arb. As SN-A, André produces instrumental electronic music that Side-Line Magazine described as "danceable electro-ambient."

Duophonic Noise Construction a dark electro project by André and his son Luis Maximilian (artist name LMX). Launched 2024.

Some other projects by André Schmechta included two with wife Stefanie, Viviane and Polyxena, the latter also featuring Heiko Daniel, and Lighthouse with friend Bernd Schöler.

=== Timeline ===
- 1969 – André Schmechta is born.
- 1969 – Stefanie Eckmann is born.
- 1971 – Thorsten Schmechta is born.
- 1987 – X Marks the Pedwalk is formed under the name Scarecrow, with its initial members being André Schmechta and Jörg Böhme.
- 1988 – Scarecrow released their first single, "Black Door". Scarecrow is signed to Zoth Ommog records, and changes their name to X Marks the Pedwalk.
- 1989 – "Arbitrary Execution" single is released. X Marks the Pedwalk plays their first live show.
- 1990 – "Danger/Disease Control" single is released.
- 1991 – "Abattoir" single is released.
- 1992 – The first full-length album, Freaks is released, followed by the "Cenotaph" stand-alone single.
- 1992 – Jörg Böhme leaves the band and is replaced by Thorsten Schmechta. André Schmechta builds T.G.I.F. studios.
- 1993 – "The Trap" is released, followed by the second full-length album, Human Desolation. "Paranoid Illusions", the second single from the aforementioned album, is also released.
- 1994 – The third full-length CD, The Killing Had Begun, is released followed by a best of collection titled Airbacktrax. Stefanie Eckmann makes her first appearance.
- 1995 – The "Facer" single is released in Europe, along with the Cleopatra Records release Four Fit (another collection). The fifth album, Meshwork is also released.
- 1996 – X Marks the Pedwalk releases their final album, Drawback.
- 1998 – André Schmechta switches careers and sells T.G.I.F. studios. Metropolis Records releases the collection Retrospective.
- 2003 – X Marks the Pedwalk makes a brief reappearance on Dying Culture Records with a 2CD best-of collection called Experiences, and contributes two new tracks to the release, "Bloom" and "Hothead".
- 2004 – André Schmechta meets with former X Marks the Pedwalk producer Alexis Schaar (also of A-Head and U-Tek) in the latter's studio in Hamburg for a small recording session. Details on this interaction have yet to be elaborated.
- 2009 – sevren ni-arb has announced a new album will be released later this year.
- 2010 – The comeback: X Marks the Pedwalk releases single Seventeen and album Inner Zone Journey. Re-Union show at Wave-Gotik-Treffen 2010 in Leipzig, Germany. Impressions:
- 2010 – sevren ni-arb has announced a first Live DVD.

== Philosophy and style ==
X Marks the Pedwalk was inspired by the late 1980s European and Canadian Electronic body music scenes, yet its members were looking to create a sound that was unique to themselves. Early X Marks the Pedwalk was often compared to fellow industrial musicians Skinny Puppy; Front Page magazine titled an article about X Marks the Pedwalk, "Die deutschen Skinny Puppy?!" (The German Skinny Puppy?!). Later, however, as their style progressed, X Marks the Pedwalk were compared to other bands. According to André Schmechta, "The concept and themes for the lyrics around [X Marks the Pedwalk] were influenced by the idea to lighten up the dark side of [the] human psyche…" Although the latter may be true, in as much as it was an objective strived for by the band, X Marks the Pedwalk found most of its audience in fans of gothic and industrial music – scenes typically associated with dark culture. What Schmechta describes as X Marks the Pedwalk's "aggressive percussion and synthesizer sequences" may have contributed to its place within the harder dance music scenes.

In addition to Skinny Puppy, comparable bands include many of the Zoth Ommog label-mates of X Marks the Pedwalk. Some of the more prominent similar acts include Leæther Strip, Evil's Toy, Armageddon Dildos, Spahn Ranch, Mentallo & The Fixer, Birmingham 6, and Funker Vogt.

== Members ==
- Sevren Ni-arb (born André Schmechta, 13 May 1969): Founder, songwriter, vocalist, producer, and engineer.
- Regan Eracs (born Jörge Böhme): Early member of X Marks the Pedwalk, from 1988 to 1992.
- Raive Yarx (born Thorsten Schmechta, 14 June 1971): Concepts, structures, and electronics. Member from 1992 to 2010.
- Estefania (Stefanie Schmechta née Eckmann, born 21 March 1969): Secondary vocalist, debuted on the album, The Killing Had Begun.

== Naming ==
The name X Marks the Pedwalk comes from a satirical story by science fiction author Fritz Leiber that describes the beginnings of a war between pedestrians and motorists. The story is glancingly referenced in Stephen King's book Danse Macabre.

Since the earliest days of X Marks the Pedwalk, members have assumed pseudonyms for themselves. André Schmechta was known as Sevren Ni-arb ("Brain Nerves" spelled backwards), his brother Thorsten was Raive Yarx (Yarx is "X-Ray" spelled backwards). Early member Jörg Böhme was called Regan Eracs (Regan is the name of the possessed child in The Exorcist, and Eracs is "scare" backwards). Stefanie Eckmann Schmechta, because she was a student of Spanish, listed her name as Estefania.

== Equipment ==
In 1992, André Schmechta created T.G.I.F. studios, recording not only all of X Marks the Pedwalk's subsequent material, but also albums by fellow electronic music artists Armageddon Dildos (who were also on Zoth Ommog) and Evil's Toy, among others. T.G.I.F. was built and designed specifically for the creation of electronic and industrial music, what follows is a list of some of the equipment utilized by Schmechta not only as both a writer and performer, but also as a producer:

- Tascam M3700 analog mixing console
- Tannoy and Yamaha loudspeakers
- Akai S3000, S1100, S1000, S-950 samplers
- E-mu Systems Emax sampler, Vintage Keys / Procussion [sic]
- Clavia Nord Rack virtual analog synthesizer
- Roland JD-800, JD-990, JX-8P synthesizers, TR-808 drum machine
- Korg MS-20, Prophecy, Poly-800 synthesizers
- Yamaha CS-1X synthesizer
- Oberheim Matrix-6 and Matrix-1000 synthesizers
- Quasimidi Quasar synthesizer
- Novation Bass-Station synthesizer
- Doepfer MS-404 analog synthesizer
- Ensoniq SQR-Plus synthesizer
- Waldorf Microwave wavetable synthesizer
- Atari and Apple Macintosh personal computers

== Discography ==
=== Singles ===
- "Black Door" (1988) (released under band name Scarecrow)
- "Arbitrary Execution" (1989)
- "Danger/Disease Control" (1990)
- "Abattoir" (1991)
- "Cenotaph" (1992)
- "The Trap" (1993)
- "Paranoid Illusions" (1993)
- "Facer" (1995)
- "Seventeen" (2010)
- "Light Your Mind" (2025)

=== Albums ===
- Freaks (1992)
- Human Desolation (1993)
- The Killing Had Begun (1994)
- Meshwork (1995)
- Drawback (1996)
- Inner Zone Journey (2010)
- The Sun, The Cold And My Underwater Fear (2012)
- The House of Rain (2015)
- Secrets (2017)
- Transformation (2020)
- New / End (2022)
- Superstition (2023)
- Insomnia (2025)

=== Compilations ===
- Airbacktrax (1994)
- Four Fit (The Singles Part Two) (1995)
- Retrospective (1998)
- Experiences (2003)

=== Side project discography ===
SN-A

- Transmissions, 2013, CD
- Distance, 2018, CD

PAX

- The Power of Pure Intellect, 1995, CD
- High Speed Digital Spirit Processing, 1997, CD – #22 CMJ RPM charts
- High Speed E.P., 1997, 12"

Ringtailed Snorter

- Revealing Obstacles, 1992, CD
- Sexual Child Abuse, 1993, CD
- Look Back in the Mirror, 1998, CD – #17 CMJ RPM charts

Hyperdex-1-Sect

- Metachrome, 1996, CD

U-Tek

- "Das Mass der Dinge", 1992, 12"/CD
- "Das Mass der Dinge Remixes", 1992, 12"
- "I'm Moving", 1995, 12"/CDS
- "Goldene Zeit 1989–1993", 1997, CD

A-Head

- "Deep Down", 1992, 12"/CDS

Viviane

- "I Feel Love", 1996, 12"/CDS

Polyxena

- "Dream Your Dream", 1996, 12"/CDS

Lighthouse

- "The Move", 1996, 12"/CDS

=== Remixes ===
- "Dear God (Remix)", from the album Morbid Mind by Evil's Toy.
- "Dear God (X Marks the Pedwalk Remix)", from the album Morbid Mind and the EP Dear God Remix by Evil's Toy.
- "Industrial Love (Nuclear Winter)", from the remix album Industrial Love/Prediction by In Strict Confidence.
- "Industrial Love (X Marks the Pedwalk Remix)", from the limited version of the album Face the Fear by In Strict Confidence.
- "Mind (X Marks the Pedwalk Remix)" and "Death is Not the End (X Marks the Pedwalk Remix)" from Hyperdex-1-Sect's album Metachrome.
- "Deep (S.A.R. Remix)" from the Deep maxi-single by Steril.
- "Schmutz (Bad Man Remix)" from the Schmutz maxi-single by ECO.

=== Production ===
Sevren Ni-Arb, as producer, for non-X Marks the Pedwalk related projects:

- Armageddon Dildos
  - Homicidal Dolls, CD, 1993
  - "Homicidal Maniac", Single, 1993
- Evil's Toy
  - Morbid Mind, CD
- Orange Sector
  - Faith, CD, 1993
  - Flashback, CD, 1994
  - Scars of Love, CD, 1998
  - Masquerade, CD, 1998
- Steril
  - Egoism, CD, 1995
  - Deep, Single, 1996
  - Venus Trap, 1996
- ECO
  - Schmutz, Single, 1995
