= Psychopomps (band) =

Danish electro-industrial band

- Also known as: Alto Relievo
- Origin: Denmark
- Genres: Electro-industrial
- Years active: 1990 – 1997; 2005 – present
- Labels: Zoth Ommog, Cleopatra, Slop Pail, Infacted
- Members: Jesper Schmidt; Flemming Norre Larsen
- Past members: Kaare Mogensen

Psychopomps is an electro-industrial band from Denmark formed by Jesper Schmidt and Flemming Norre Larsen. They were signed to Zoth Ommog Records in the early 1990s followed by Cleopatra Records. Their early records were recorded at Strip Studios by their close friend and label mate, Claus Larsen of Leaether Strip.

== History ==
Larsen and Schmidt met as schoolmates during their youth. In their teens they were drawn to bands like Depeche Mode, but then came into contact with industrial and EBM music when they saw Nitzer Ebb open for Depeche Mode on tour. These formed some of their earliest influences alongside Wax Trax! label bands like Revolting Cocks and Ministry.

They soon began to experiment with making music and came into possession of two Moog synthesizers bought secondhand from Claus Larsen of Leaether Strip, who they had met at a record store where he was working at the time. Larsen and Schmidt created their first 4-track recording under the name Alto Relievo, but subsequently changed their name to Psychopomps after reading "The Dark Half" by author Stephen King.

The only notable line-up change was the addition of Kaare Mogensen as a guitarist for the recording of Fiction Non-Fiction in 1997. The band appeared defunct after the release of Fiction Non-Fiction, but has created a Myspace page with new content as well as old and unreleased songs.

In 2014, Infacted Recordings released a retrospective compilation of the band's work titled Infection Start 90.

== Discography ==
=== Albums ===
- Assassins DK United – (1992, Zoth Ommog Records; 1994, Cleopatra Records)
- Pro-Death Ravers – (1993, Zoth Ommog, Cleopatra)
- Six Six Six Nights in Hell – (1995, Zoth Ommog; 1996, Cleopatra)
- Fiction Non-Fiction – (1997, Zoth Ommog)

=== Singles & EPs ===
- More DK – (1991, 12"/EPCD, Slop Pail Records)
- "Godshit" – (1992, 12"/MCD, Zoth Ommog)
- In The Skin – (1994, EPCD, Slop Pail; 1995, EPCD, Cleopatra)

=== Compilations ===
- First Blood – (1995, Zoth Ommog; 1996, Cleopatra)
- The Best Of – (2000, Cleopatra)
- Infection Start 90 – (2014, Infacted Recordings)

=== Soundtrack ===
- Saw – (2004, song "Wonderful World")
- Diamond Cartel – (2017, song "The Slaughter")
