= Josh Mostel =

American actor (born 1946)

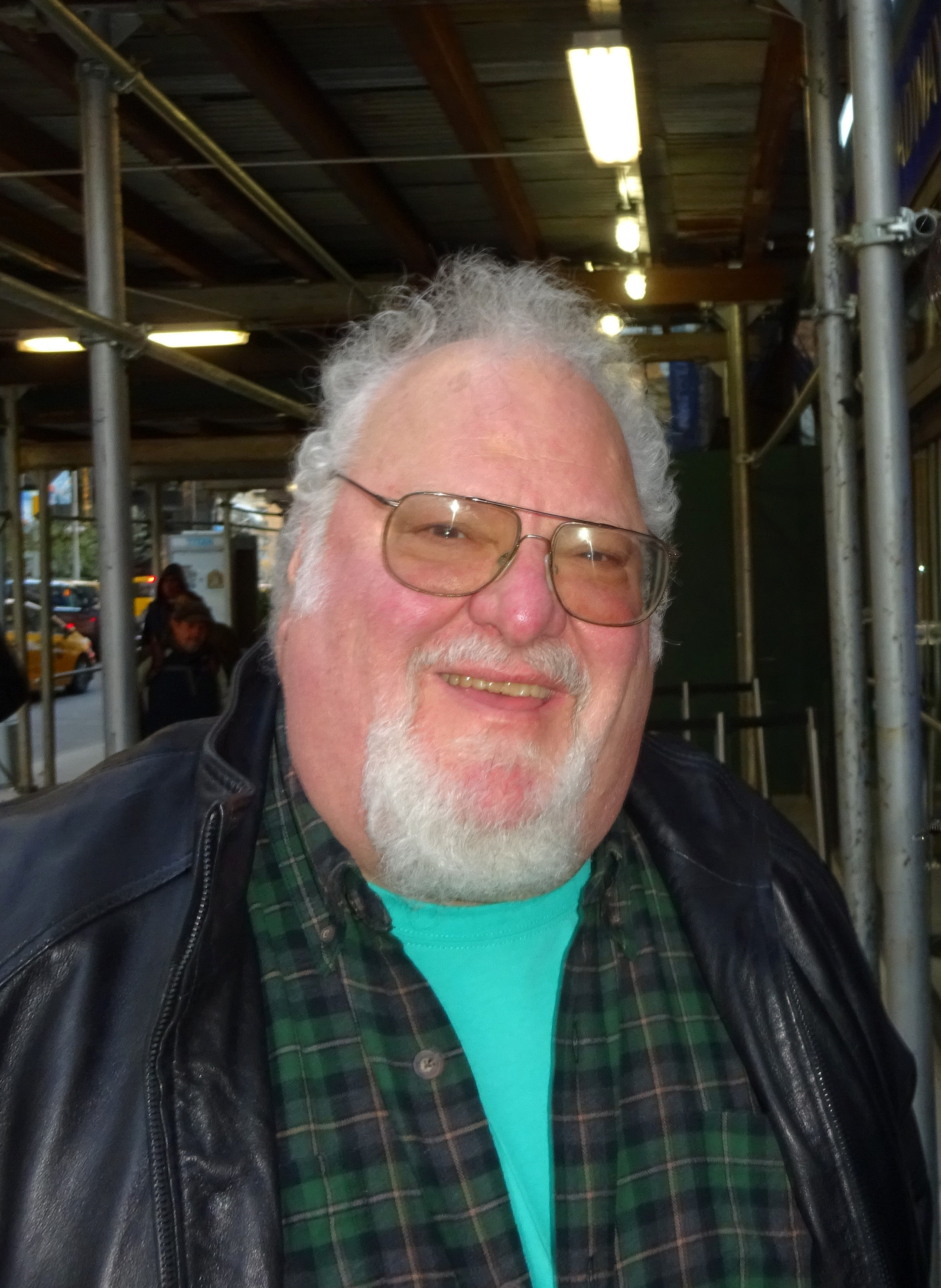
- Mostel in 2016
- Born: December 21, 1946 (age 79); New York City, U.S.
- Occupation: Actor
- Years active: 1971–present
- Spouses: Peggy Rajski (m. 1983; div. 1998) Kim Murdock (m. 2016)
- Father: Zero Mostel

Joshua Mostel (born December 21, 1946) is an American actor with numerous film and Broadway credits. The son of Zero Mostel, he is best known for his supporting roles in films such as Jesus Christ Superstar (1973), Harry and Tonto (1974), Sophie's Choice (1982), City Slickers (1991), Billy Madison (1995), and Big Daddy (1999).

== Early life ==
Mostel was born in New York City, the son of Kathryn Celia, née Harkin, an actress, dancer, and writer, and Zero Mostel, a comic actor.

== Career ==
Mostel started his career as a boy soprano at the Metropolitan Opera in New York. He graduated from Brandeis University. His Broadway debut was in 1971 with Unlikely Heroes. In 1973, Mostel had one of his more notable film performances as Herod in Jesus Christ Superstar. In 1979, Mostel briefly starred in Delta House, the television version of the film Animal House; he played Blotto Blutarsky, the brother of the character Bluto (played by John Belushi in the original film).

On Broadway, he appeared in the 1989 revival of The Threepenny Opera as Money Matthew; as the frazzled head writer in the original 1992 production of My Favorite Year; and in George Furth and Stephen Sondheim's non-musical mystery play Getting Away With Murder, which had a brief run in 1994.

He also played the part of "the best trader on the street", Ollie, one of Gordon Gekko's traders in Wall Street.

== Personal life ==
Mostel lives in New York, with a summer home on Monhegan Island. Tobias Mostel, his brother, is an artist.

== Acting roles ==
=== Film ===
Josh Mostel film credits
Year	Title	Role
1971	Going Home	Mr. Bonelli
1972	The King of Marvin Gardens	Frank
1973	Jesus Christ Superstar	Herod Antipas
1974	Harry and Tonto	Norman Coombes
1976	The Money (Atlantic City Jackpot)	Wheel-of-fortune operator
1976	Deadly Hero	Victor
1981	Dead Ringer	Russell
1982	Fighting Back	Duster
1982	Sophie's Choice	Morris Fink
1983	Star 80	Private Detective
1984	The Brother from Another Planet	Casio Vendor
1984	Windy City	Sol
1985	Almost You	David
1985	Compromising Positions	Dicky Dunck
1985	Stoogemania	Howard F. Howard
1986	The Money Pit	Jack Schnittman
1987	Radio Days	Abe
1987	Matewan	Mayor Cabell Testerman
1987	Wall Street	Ollie
1989	Animal Behavior	Mel Gorsky
1991	City Slickers	Barry Shalowitz
1991	Naked Tango	Bertoni the Jeweler
1991	Little Man Tate	Physics Professor
1991	City of Hope	Mad Anthony
1992	Nervous Ticks	Saul Warshow
1993	Searching for Bobby Fischer	Chess Club Regular
1994	The Chase	Officer Figus
1994	Bye Bye America	Abe
1994	City Slickers II: The Legend of Curly's Gold	Barry Shalowitz
1995	The Maddening	Chicky Ross
1995	Billy Madison	Principal Max Anderson
1995	The Basketball Diaries	Counterman
1995	Let It Be Me	Jordan
1998	Great Expectations	Jerry Ragno
1998	Rounders	Zagosh
1999	The Out-of-Towners	Dr. Faber
1999	Big Daddy	Arthur Brooks
2001	Knockaround Guys	Mac McCreadle
2009	State of Play	Pete
2016	The Congressman	Bernie Gimpel
2024	Bad Shabbos	Saul

=== Television ===
Josh Mostel television credits
Year	Title	Role	Notes
1987	The Equalizer	Winston Erdlow	Episode: "Beyond Control"
1990	Beverly Hills, 90210	Mr. Ridley	Episode: "Class of Beverly Hills"
1998	Thicker Than Blood	Kendall	TV movie
2003	Law & Order	Harvey Anchin	Episode: "Kid Pro Quo"
2012	Law & Order: Special Victims Unit	Mr. Roth	Episode: "Hunting Ground"
2015	Blue Bloods	Victor Flores	1 episode
2020	Hunters	Rabbi Steckler	3 episodes

=== Broadway productions ===
Title	Dates of Production
Unlikely Heroes	October 26, 1971 – November 13, 1971
An American Millionaire	April 20, 1974 – May 5, 1974
A Texas Trilogy: Lu Ann Hampton Laverty Oberlander	September 21, 1976 – October 30, 1976
A Texas Trilogy: The Last Meeting of the Knights of the White Magnolia	September 22, 1976 – October 31, 1976
Threepenny Opera	November 5, 1989 – December 31, 1989
My Favorite Year	December 10, 1992 – January 10, 1993
The Flowering Peach	March 20, 1994 – April 24, 1994
Getting Away with Murder	March 17, 1996 – March 31, 1996
