= Mimi Benzell =

American actress (1918–1970)

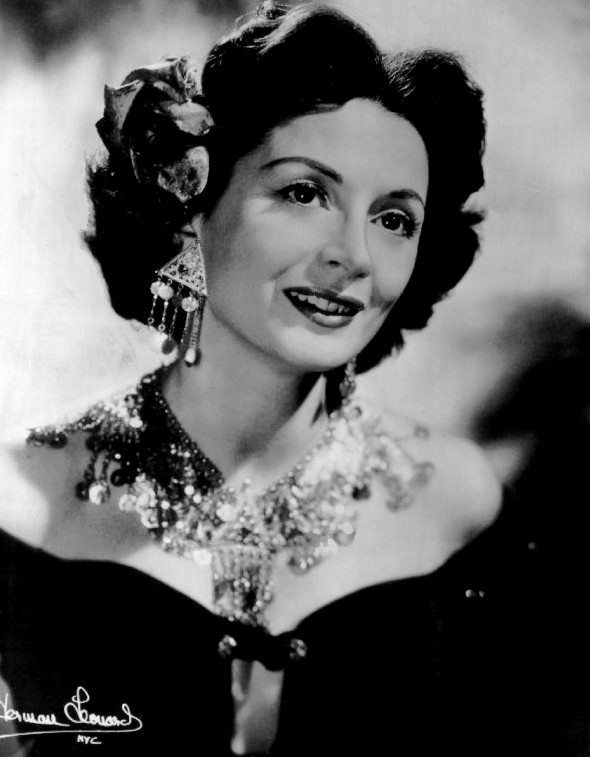
- Benzell in 1956.
- Born: Miriam Ruth Benzell; April 6, 1918; Bridgeport, Connecticut, US
- Died: December 23, 1970 (aged 52); North Shore University Hospital, Manhasset, New York, US
- Occupations: Actress, singer
- Spouse: Walter Gould (m. 1949)
- Children: 2
- Relatives: Morton Gould (brother-in-law)

Miriam Ruth "Mimi" Benzell (April 6, 1918 – December 23, 1970) was an American soprano who performed with the Metropolitan Opera before establishing herself as a Broadway musical theatre, television, and nightclub performer.

== Life and career ==
=== Early life and education ===
Mimi Benzell was born in Bridgeport, Connecticut on April 6, 1918 to William and Esther (née Cohn) Benzell. Her father was in the furniture business and her paternal grandfather had been a popular singer in Russia before emigrating to the United States. Mimi Benzell and her family moved to New York City, where she attended James Madison High School in Brooklyn, New York. She later attended Hunter College for two years and the Mannes School of Music.

Though Benzell was originally a piano student, she switched over to voice under the instruction of Madame Olga Eisner.

=== Career ===
At the age of 20, Benzell made her debut in a Sunday concert in Mexico City on December 3, 1944, during which she played the role of Zerlina in Mozart's Don Giovanni and the Queen of the Night in The Magic Flute. She made her Metropolitan Opera stage debut on January 5, 1945, again playing the role of the Queen of the Night in The Magic Flute. Additional Met credits that Benzell compiled include performances in La Bohème, Mignon, Rigoletto, Der Rosenkavalier, Carmen, and Barber of Seville.

On March 23, 1956, Benzell starred as the guest soloist in the Hofstra College Symphony Orchestra's final concert of the season at Hofstra University.

In 1961, she appeared in Jerry Herman's first book musical, Milk and Honey, which proved to be her only Broadway production. Benzell performed on The Ed Sullivan Show, then still titled Toast of the Town, eleven times between 1949 and 1955. In 1951 she co-starred in The Pet Milk Show on radio with Jack Pearl, which aired on Tuesday nights on NBC, and also featured Cliff Hall and Gus Haenschen's Orchestra. She appeared as a panelist on both the daytime and primetime editions of the game show To Tell the Truth, and was a guest star on the short-lived DuMont series Off the Record alongside Zero Mostel and Joey Faye. Among her recordings were Roberta and The Vagabond King, both with Alfred Drake.

==== Director of the Nassau County Office of Performing and Fine Arts ====
On January 30, 1969, Benzell was appointed by Nassau County Executive Eugene H. Nickerson as the director of the Nassau County Office of Performing and Fine Arts. A major accomplishment that the Nassau County Office of Performing and Fine Arts made under her direction was the successful coordination of cultural programs in schools across Nassau County.

She served in this capacity until 1970, when she stepped down for personal reasons.

Despite her resignation as director, she continued to serve as an adviser for the office.

=== Personal life ===
Benzell was married to Walter Gould, the brother of American composer Morton Gould; Walter also served as her manager. They resided at 45 Cardinal Road in Flower Hill, New York, and had two children: Jonathan and Jennifer. She was active in numerous charitable organizations, including the women's division of B'nai B'rith.

== Death and legacy ==
Benzell died of an undisclosed form of cancer on December 23, 1970, at North Shore University Hospital in Manhasset, New York, at the age of 52. Her funeral service was held in Manhattan on December 27.

A small green space on Waring Drive in Flower Hill near her former home is named Miriam Benzell Green in honor of Benzell.
