= Self-inflicted (disambiguation) =

Self-inflicted describes a wound or injury done to oneself.

Self-inflicted or variant may also refer to:

- Self-Inflicted, a 1997 Leæther Strip album
- Self Inflicted, a 2016 Chelsea Grin album
- Self Inflicted, a 2004 album by Project:Deadman (Prozak and Mike E. Clark)
- "Self Inflicted", a song from the 2008 Katy Perry album One of the Boys
- "Self Inflicted", a song from the 2013 Filter album The Sun Comes Out Tonight
