= Penetrate the Satanic Citizen =

Compilation album by Leæther Strip
- Released: October 1992
- Genre: Electronic
- Length: 77:06
- Label: Re-Constriction
- Producer: Claus Larsen

Leæther Strip chronology
Penetrate the Satanic Citizen (1992)	Fit for Flogging (1993)

Penetrate the Satanic Citizen is a Leæther Strip compilation album released by Re-Constriction Records in October 1992. Together with Fit for Flogging, the album bundles most of Leæther Strip's releases prior to Solitary Confinement.

== Track listing ==
All tracks are written by Claus Larsen

No.	Title	Length
1.	"Japanese Bodies 92"	6:26
2.	"Leæther Strip, Pt. 2"	6:01
3.	"Rotation"	4:58
4.	"Mohawk"	6:29
5.	"Razor Blades 92"	4:19
6.	"Torment Me"	5:21
7.	"What's Hell Really Like"	3:56
8.	"Touchdown Breakdown"	3:39
9.	"Die Die Die"	4:00
10.	"Zyklon B"	5:25
11.	"Body Machine Body"	4:06
12.	"Satanic Citizen"	6:03
13.	"Battleground"	6:28
14.	"Change"	4:36
15.	"Leæther Strip, Pt. 1"	5:20

== Personnel ==
Adapted from the Penetrate the Satanic Citizen liner notes.

- Claus Larsen – lead vocals, arrangements, production, mixing

== Release history ==
Region	Date	Label	Format	Catalog
United States	1992	Re-Constriction	CD	REC-002
