= Leæther Strip =

Danish musical project

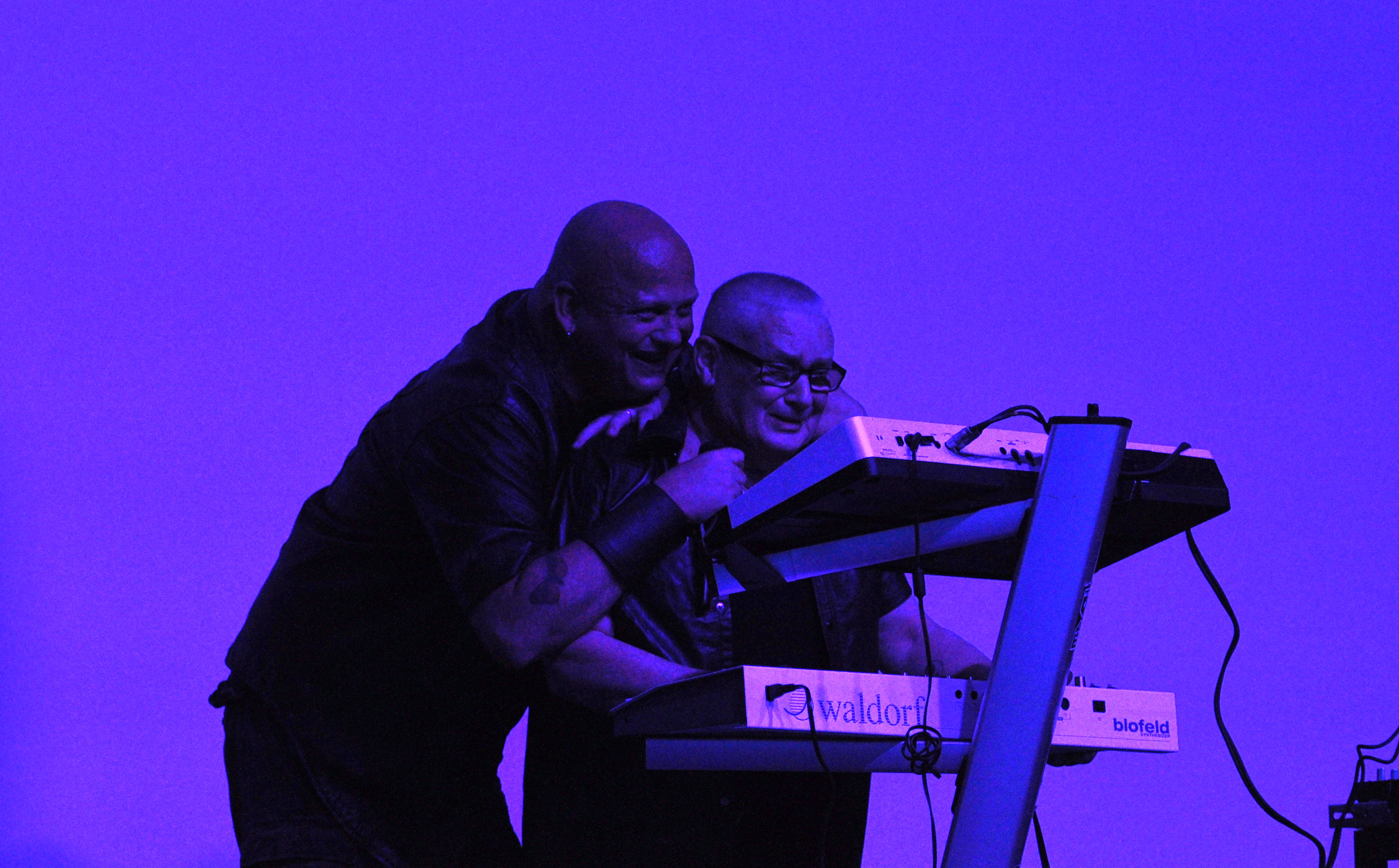
- Leæther Strip live at the E-tropolis Festival 2013, Berlin; Claus Larsen and his husband Kurt Grünewald Hansen at the keyboards

Background information
- Origin: Denmark
- Genres: Electro-industrial, EBM
- Years active: 1988–2001; 2005–present
- Labels: Zoth Ommog; Cleopatra; Metropolis; Bloodline; Alfa Matrix; Re-Constriction; Ras Dva
- Spinoffs: Klutæ
- Members: Claus Larsen
- Past members: Kurt Grünewald Hansen

Leæther Strip is a Danish musical project founded on 13 January 1988 by Claus Larsen. Its influence has been most felt in the electronic body music and electro-industrial genres. Leæther Strip was one of the earliest and most prominent acts on Germany's now defunct Zoth Ommog record label. For distribution outside of Europe, the music has been licensed to the U.S. labels Cleopatra Records and Metropolis Records. After the demise of Zoth Ommog in 1999, Larsen signed to Bloodline Records, which only released a single before also going out of business. In 2005, Leæther Strip signed with the Belgian-based label Alfa Matrix. On 3 June 2011 Larsen announced his split from Alfa Matrix in order to self-release future material.

== History ==
Larsen was born on 13 November 1967 in Aalborg, Denmark. He first released music under the name of Leæther Strip in 1989, but he had been in as many as three bands previously, the last of which was a solo "instrumental melodic techno" project named Forbidden Art. His 1995 release G.A.W.M.U.S. (Getting Away With Murder U. S.) included two early demos from 1982 and 1984, with the latter forming the unknown beginning of the band according to an interview conducted with Claus Larsen. In 1991, Larsen created a side-project called Klute in which he also remained the sole member.

The band name was intended to convey the literal meaning — a small band of leather — though Larsen has been guarded as to the reason. During some early shows, the racy implications of the name "strip" led some to believe that his act was explicitly pornographic to the point where one show was scouted by a pornographic magazine.

His first album, The Pleasure of Penetration, was produced by Talla 2XLC (Andreas Tomalla of Bigod 20) and Ra/Hen (Ralf Henrich of Robotiko Rejekto) and released on the German label Zoth Ommog Records. His early records were labeled "industrial" music, although Larsen himself had no specific opinion of what genre the music fit into. In 1994, Larsen changed the sound of Leæther Strip, with the release of a synthesized semi classical album, Serenade for the Dead, which was conceived as a soundtrack to a fictional film. This change in sound was compounded by the tragedy of the near death of his father and culminated in the darker and more somber 1995 album Legacy of Hate and Lust. The releases since then have reincorporated electronic dance elements, and have redefined Leæther Strip into what Larsen calls "symphonic electro".

Leæther Strip remained silent for several years after the release of the single Carry Me in 2000 and the official band website, which once contained a wealth of information regarding the project, was taken offline. In foreshadowing the return of his band, Larsen's remix of the band KiEw's song Graograman on the Diskette EP (2003) states at the beginning of the song, in a sing-song computer-generated voice, "Leæther Strip will return for more electronic mayhem". In an interview conducted late 2005, Larsen revealed that label issues, as well as personal concerns, caused the dormancy of the band during the 2000–2005 period.

28 October 2005 marked the official return of Leæther Strip with the EP release Suicide Bombers on the Alfa Matrix label. Claus Larsen opened a blog to inform fans of his current activities and progress on the project. A string of releases followed including the 2-CD album After the Devastation, and the 2006 EP releases Walking on Volcanos and Fætish. Also in 2006, Claus Larsen released a free song via his MySpace page, a remix of Frank Tovey taught me things. The song was subsequently downloaded over 10,000 times.

On 13 April 2007, Leæther Strip released the album The Giant Minutes to the Dawn. It was made available in several editions, including a special limited edition box-set which includes the band's first DVD release. According to various reviewers, the album constituted the "true" return of the band to classic Leæther Strip form.

In a post to his MySpace blog made in late November 2008, Larsen announced his intention to develop a live show for a small run of exclusive engagements in 2009. Two shows took place in Denmark in April 2009, and Leaether Strip has been confirmed to perform at the Power Strip Festival in the USA and the Amphi Festival in Germany during Summer 2009.

Via a video teaser on YouTube Claus Larsen announced that the first Leaether Strip album, The Pleasure of Penetration, would be re-released as a remastered double CD set on 13 November 2007, Claus Larsen's birthday, under the title Retention n°1. The release is part of an ongoing box series through which Claus Larsen will re-release his complete back-catalogue via the Belgian label Alfa Matrix. Each re-release will have both the fully remastered version of the original album on disc 1 and on the second disc, a totally re-written and reinterpretation of some selected songs from the original album by Leaether Strip himself re-recorded with current technologies. The original track-list on disc 1 has been extended to 15 tracks with the addition of early 12" tracks and other rarities of the period.

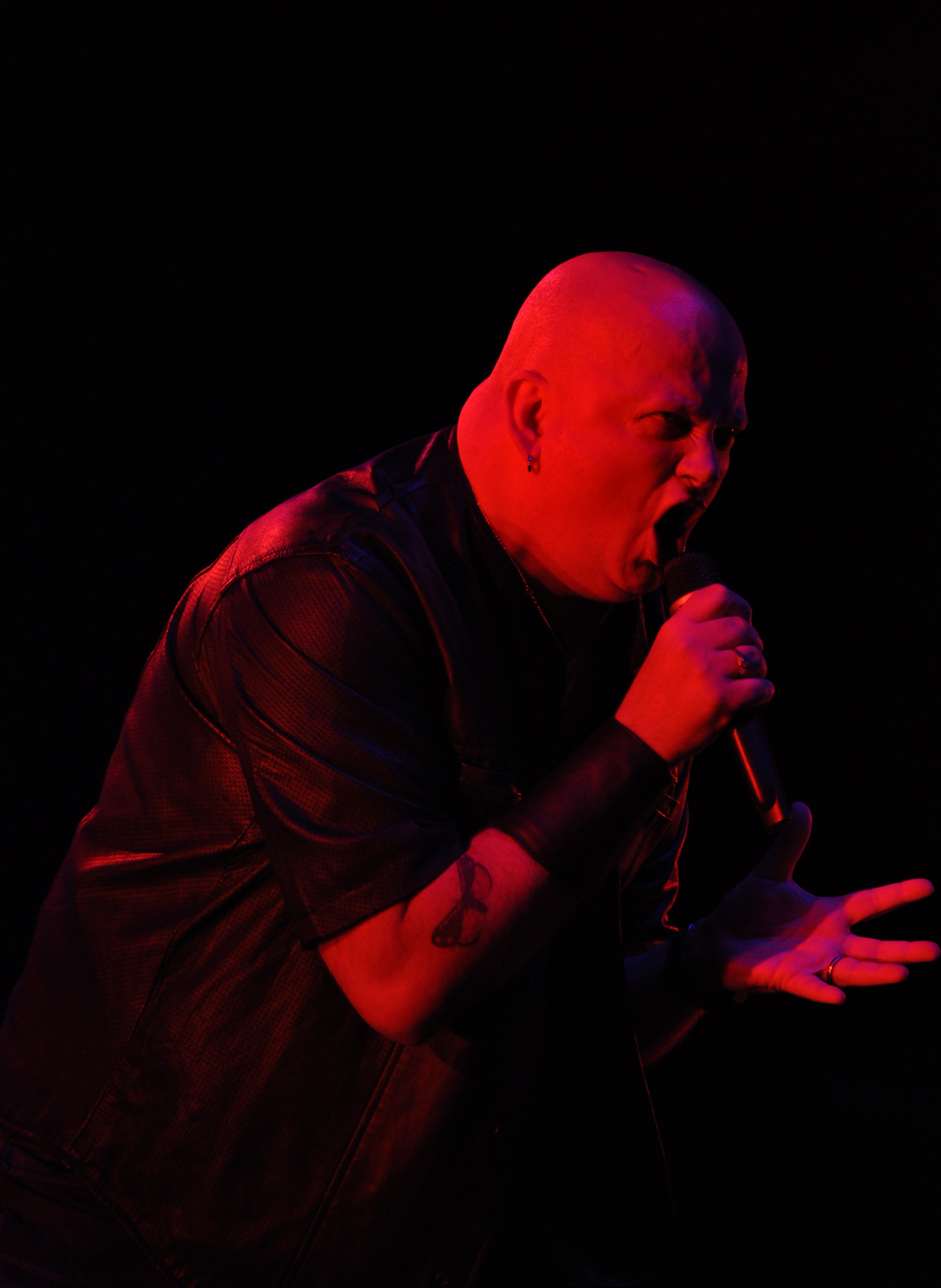
Leæther Strip live at the E-tropolis Festival 2013, Berlin: Claus Larsen

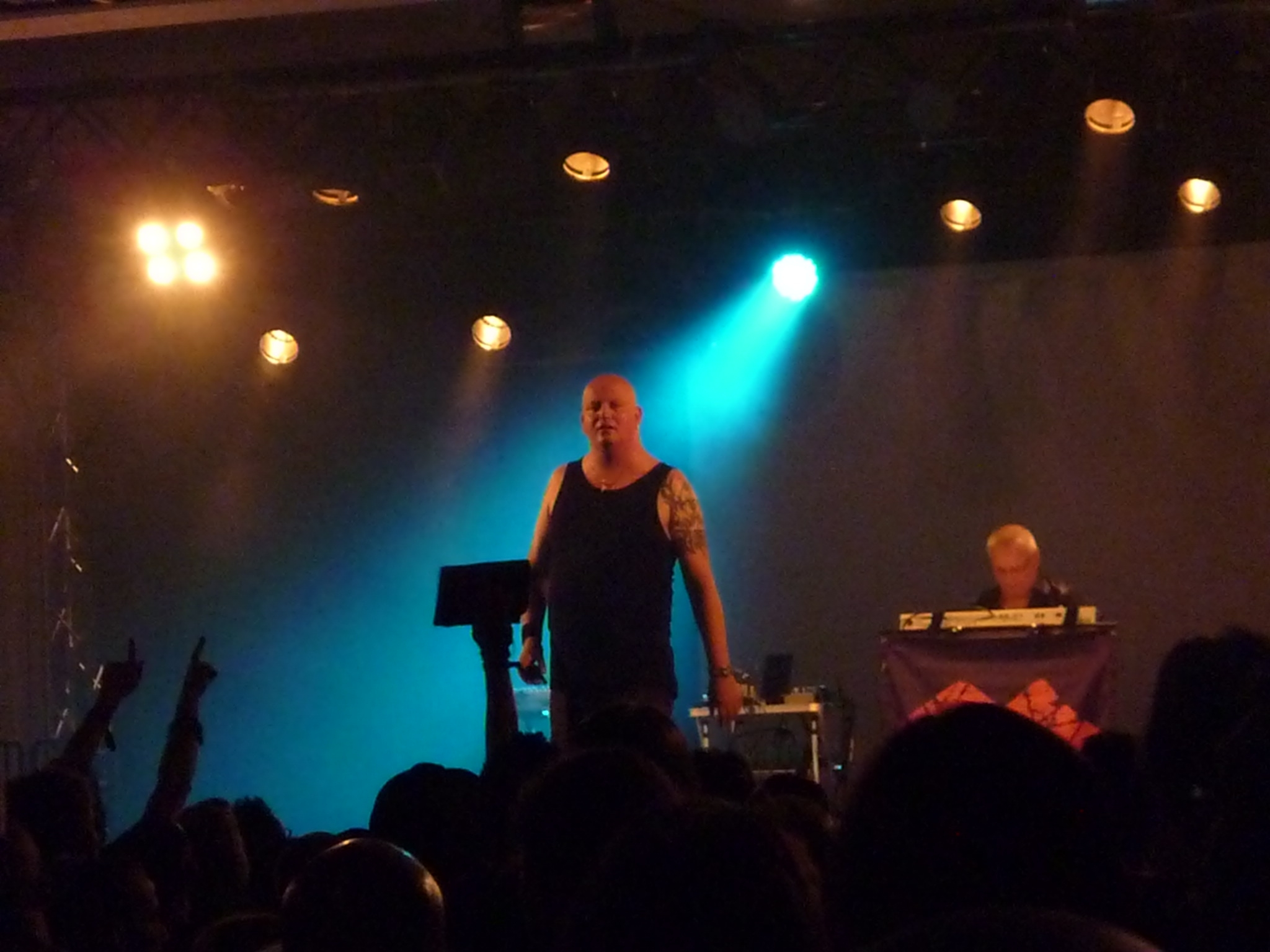
Leather Strip live in 2011

Larsen's lyrics for Leaether Strip are often frank and direct, sometimes to the point of being hostile. Political songs include the anti-Nazi song "AEighty AEight" which contains the chorus "You are not human / You are not soldiers" as well as the song "Suicide Bombers" (On the Suicide Bombers EP) with its chorus question, "Who told you to die that way?" More frequently, Larsen explores his own personal issues in the same open fashion, resulting in many tracks that are simultaneously aggressive and introspective.

Larsen's husband and band companion, Kurt Grünewaldt Hansen, died on 28 September 2020, after a battle with cancer, aged 75.

== Discography ==
Albums

- 1990 – The Pleasure of Penetration
- 1990 – Science for the Satanic Citizen
- 1992 – Solitary Confinement
- 1993 – Underneath the Laughter
- 1994 – Serenade for the Dead
- 1995 – Legacy of Hate and Lust
- 1996 – The Rebirth of Agony
- 1997 – Self-Inflicted
- 2005 – After the Devastation (2 CD)
- 2007 – The Giant Minutes to the Dawn
- 2008 – Civil Disobedience (2 CD)
- 2009 – Ængelmaker (2 CD)
- 2009 – Yes I'm Limited V (2 CD)
- 2009 – Hærværk
- 2010 – Seasons Change – I Don't
- 2010 – Mental Slavery (2 CD)
- 2011 – Untold Stories – The Melancholic Sessions
- 2013 – Serenade for the Dead II
- 2014 – Æscapism
- 2014 – Æppreciation
- 2016 – Spaectator
- 2017 – 50
- 2018 – World Molæster

EP/single releases

- 1989 – Japanese Bodies – 12"S
- 1990 – Aspects of Aggression – EP CD
- 1991 – Object V – EP CD
- 1994 – Positive Depression – EP CD
- 1995 – Material – EP CD
- 1997 – Anal Cabaret: A Tribute to Soft Cell – EP CD
- 2000 – Carry Me – CDS – #38 DAC Top 100 Singles of 2000
- 2005 – Suicide Bombers – EP CD – #1 DAC Singles chart
- 2006 – Walking on Volcanos – EP CD – #8 DAC Singles chart
- 2006 – Fætish – EP CD – #3 DAC Singles chart
- 2008 – When Blood Runs Dark – Digital-only EP
- 2008 – Diægnosis – Digital-only EP
- 2008 – Living on Video – Single (Cleopatra Records)
- 2012 – Object ÆP
- 2012 – In Broken Homes / Paranoia nr. 13
- 2016 – Pleasure Boys – Single (Cleopatra Records)

Compilations

- 1992 – Penetrate the Satanic Citizen
- 1993 – Fit for Flogging
- 1995 – Double or Nothing (2 CD)
- 1995 – Getting Away With Murder: Murders from 1982 to 1995
- 1996 – Best of Leæther Strip
- 1997 – Retrospective
- 2005 – Satanic Reasons: The Very Best Of (2 CD)

Limited releases

- 1992 – Yes, I'm Limited – EP CD
- 1996 – Yes, I'm Limited Vol. II – #29 CMJ RPM Chart
- 1998 – Yes, I'm Limited Vol. III (2 CD) – #15 CMJ RPM Chart
- 2005 – Æftershock – CDS (available only with the After the Devastation limited box edition)
- 2006 – Hælloween – EP CD (available only with the Fætish limited box edition)
- 2007 – The Hourglass – EP CD (available only with The Giant Minutes to the Dawn limited box edition)
- 2008 – One Nine Eight Two – CDS (available only with the Civil Disobedience limited box edition)
- 2009 – Yes, I'm Limited Vol. IV – EP CD (available only with the Ængelmaker limited box edition)

DVD releases

- 2007 – Watch – DVD NSTC region 0 (available only with the limited box edition The Giant Minutes to the Dawn)

Other releases

- 1997 – "X-Files Theme" (arrangement of Mark Snow) on Sci-Fi Cafe (Hypnotic – CLP 0097-2)
- 1999 – Serenade for the Dead (re-mastered) (2 CD)
- 2006 – After the Devastation (Limited 3 CD Special Bag Edition)

Limited edition of the double album includes: After The Devastation" Limited Edition 3-CD Box Set, "Evacuate Or Die", Double Sided Printed T-Shirt, Poster and Deluxe Bag, Matri-X-traX Chapter I and some postcards

- 2006 – Fætish (Limited 2 CD Box)

Limited to 2000 copies including "Hælloween" 5-track EP, some special fetish goodies (condom, button, postcards) and a booklet full of Leæther Strip fans fetish artwork.

- 2007 – The Giant Minutes to the Dawn (2 CD+DVD fan boxset)

Limited edition including "The Hourglass" EP, "Watch" DVD, the "Trust your instinct" T-shirt and some fan goodies

- 2007 – Retention no.1 (2CD)

Reedition of first album The Pleasure of Penetration (re-mastered) + The Pleasure of Reproduction which includes 2007 re-recordings of first album.

- 2008 – Retention no.2 (2CD)

Reedition of second album Science for the Satanic Citizen and EP Object V (re-mastered) + Science for the Satanic Spawn which includes 2008 re-recordings of both aforementioned releases.

- 2011 – Louis Guidone – Meet Your Maker – LGCD06 – Guest Vocalist
- 2013 – Vaylon – Primus (Digital Album Mastering)
- 2013 – Vaylon – A Part Of Me (Remix & Mastering)
- 2014 – Vaylon – Primus VIP Edition (CD Mastering)
- 2014 – Vaylon – Magnum Opus (Digital Album Mastering)
- 2014 – Vaylon – Magnum Opus – VIP Edition Part One (CD Mastering)
- 2014 – Vaylon – Magnum Opus – VIP Edition Part Two (CD Mastering)
- 2014 – Vaylon – Everything Glows (Digital EP Mastering)
- 2025 – Krushed Opiates - The Rebirth EP (Guest Vocalist on A Serpent's Hiss)
- 2026 – Krushed Opiates - Attack Warning Red (Guest Vocalist all Tracks)

== Side projects ==
- Klutæ – electro-industrial side-project, formerly known as Klute

== Influenced ==
- Dunkelwerk
- Psychopomps
- Wumpscut

== See also ==
- List of electro-industrial bands
