= Fit for Flogging =

Compilation album by Leæther Strip

Compilation album by Leæther Strip
- Released: 1993
- Genre: Industrial, EBM
- Length: 49:52
- Label: Cleopatra Records

Leæther Strip chronology
Penetrate the Satanic Citizen (1992)	Fit for Flogging (1993)	Double or Nothing

Fit for Flogging is a 1993 album by the Danish musical project Leæther Strip, released on Cleopatra Records. Together with Penetrate the Satanic Citizen it bundles most of Leæther Strip's releases prior to Solitary Confinement.

== Track listing ==
1. Antius
2. Black Gold
3. G.A.W.M.
4. Steal!
5. Go Fuck Your Ass Off!
6. Law of Jante
7. Nosecandy
8. Fit for Flogging
9. Cast Away
10. The Nature of God
11. Break My Back
12. Khomeini
