= Kiew =

Kiew may refer to:

- Ruth Kiew (1946–2025), British botanist whose standard author abbreviation is Kiew
- The German or archaic English variant spelling of Kyiv
- KiEw (band), a German band
- An alternate spelling of the name of Somdet Kiaw, the Acting Supreme Patriarch of Thailand
