= Getting Away with Murder =

Getting Away with Murder may refer to:

== Film and television ==
- Getting Away with Murder (film), a 1996 American black comedy
- Getting Away with Murder (1975 film) or End of the Game, a German mystery thriller
- Getting Away with Murder (web series), a 2008–2009 comic series on the Independent Film Channel and its website
- Getting Away with Murder: The JonBenet Ramsey Story, a 2000 American television docudrama
- "Getting Away with Murder" (The Traitors), a 2023 TV episode

== Music ==
- Gettin' Away with Murder, an album by Patti Austin, 1985
- Getting Away with Murder (album), by Papa Roach, 2004
  - "Getting Away with Murder" (song), the title song
- Getting Away with Murder: Murders from 1982 to 1995, an album by Leæther Strip, 1995

== Theatre ==
- Getting Away with Murder (play), a 1996 play by Stephen Sondheim and George Furth
- Twist (stage play), originally Getting Away with Murder, a 1990 play by Miles Tredinnick

== Other uses ==
- Getting Away with Murder: The True Story of the Emmett Till Case, a 1993 non-fiction book by Chris Crowe
- Getting Away with Murder, a reporting banner for the annual Global Impunity Index issued by the Committee to Protect Journalists

== See also ==
- "Get Away with Murder", a song by Jeffree Star from Beauty Killer, 2009
