= Kate Mostel =

American dancer, actress and memoirist (1918–1986)

Kate Mostel, born Kathryn Harkin (1918–1986), was an American dancer, actress and memoirist.

== Life ==
Kathryn Cecilia Harkin was born in Philadelphia on October 8, 1918. The youngest of eight children, she made her first stage appearance in the children's act Broadway Varieties. After leaving high school, she joined Catherine Littlefield's ballet company. After leaving the company later, she danced in nightclubs in Chicago, New Jersey, New York, and Rio de Janeiro. In 1940 she became a Rockette at Radio City Music Hall.

In 1944 she married the actor Zero Mostel. The couple had two sons, Joshua and Tobias.

Kate Mostel moved into acting, appearing on Broadway in The Bird Cage, The Ladies of the Corridor and Three Men on a Horse. She also starred with Zero Mostel in his adaptation of The Imaginary Invalid.

In 1978 Mostel, recently widowed, co-authored a memoir with the actress Madeline Lee Gilford, who was married to fellow actor Jack Gilford. The book, entitled 170 Years in Show Business, told the story of the professional and personal lives of the two couples, including their encounters with other showbiz celebrities ranging from Dorothy Parker to Lotte Lenya.

Mostel died in New York City on January 22, 1986. Papers relating to her are held at the New York Public Library.

== Books ==
- (with Madeline Lee Gilford) 170 Years of Show Business. New York: Random House, 1978.
