= Klutæ =

Industrial music project

Klutæ is an industrial music project founded by Danish musician Claus Larsen, who is best known for his main project, Leæther Strip. Originally formed in 1991 under the name Klute, Larsen began the project after finishing a Leæther Strip release and feeling compelled to generate music in a completely different modality than his flagship project. Larsen chose the name on a whim after viewing a TV ad for the film of the same name (Larsen admits he's never watched the film.) The project went dormant after 1996's Excel. It reformed in 2006 as Klutæ, to avoid confusion with drum and bass artist Tom Withers who had since risen to prominence with the pseudonym Klute. The come-back EP Sinner and the following album Hit'n'Run were released by the Belgian label Alfa Matrix.

As compared to Leæther Strip, Larsen describes Klutæ as more "loud and fun." Klutæ's initial releases were in the industrial metal style, mixing Leæther Strip's electro-industrial sound with sampled guitars. In its more recent guise, it has returned to a more classic electro-industrial style.

== Discography ==
- Explicit (EP, 1991)
- Excluded (Album, 1993)
- Excepted (EP, 1994)
- Excel (EP, 1996)
- Sinner (EP, 2006)
- Hit 'n' Run (Album, 2006)
- Slippery When Dead (EP, 2011)
- Electro Punks Unite (Album, 2011)
- EXEcution (Double album, 2012)
- Queer for Satan (Album, 2020)
- Godsent (Album, 2025)
