= Off the Record (TV series) =

1948 American TV series

- Starring: Zero Mostel; Joey Faye; Mimi Benzell
- Country of origin: United States

Production
- Producer: Martin Gosch
- Running time: 30 minutes

Original release
- Network: DuMont Television Network
- Release: October 19 – October 26, 1948

Off the Record is a comedy television series that aired on the DuMont Television Network in October 1948.

== Broadcast history ==
The show, slated to air Tuesdays at 7pm ET, and starring Zero Mostel and Joey Faye, only lasted two episodes, October 19 and October 26, 1948. Mostel claimed he had been promised a live audience, but the available studio was too small to hold an audience. The setting was a radio station, a set at the Wanamaker Studios.

The 1948 show is not to be confused with a 15-minute show in 1951–52, also called Off the Record, aired from DuMont station WTTG in Washington, DC. This latter show, hosted by Art Lamb and Aletha Agee, featured singers lip-synching to current pop songs, and is on YouTube.

== Preservation status ==
As with most DuMont series, no episodes are known to exist.

== See also ==
- List of programs broadcast by the DuMont Television Network
- List of surviving DuMont Television Network broadcasts
- 1948-49 United States network television schedule

== Bibliography ==
- David Weinstein, The Forgotten Network: DuMont and the Birth of American Television (Philadelphia: Temple University Press, 2004) ISBN 1-59213-245-6
- Alex McNeil, Total Television, Fourth edition (New York: Penguin Books, 1980) ISBN 0-14-024916-8
- Tim Brooks and Earle Marsh, The Complete Directory to Prime Time Network TV Shows, Third edition (New York: Ballantine Books, 1964) ISBN 0-345-31864-1
