= After the Devastation =

Studio album by Leaether Strip
- Released: 2005
- Genres: EBM, electro-industrial
- Label: Alfa Matrix

Leaether Strip chronology
Self-Inflicted (1997)	After the Devastation (2005)	The Giant Minutes to the Dawn (2007)

Professional ratings
Review scores
Source	Rating
AllMusic	3.5/5 stars

After the Devastation is a two-CD album by Leæther Strip, and is his comeback album after a five-year hiatus. Some editions of the album included the bonus EP ÆFTERSHOCK.

== Track listing ==
Disc 1

1. The Shame Of A Nation (Album Edit)
2. Back In Control
3. Death Is Walking Next To Me (Album Edit)
4. A Boy
5. Dying Is Easy – Life Is Harder (Daddy Please Love Me)
6. Sleep Is Only Heartbreak
7. Slam
8. Smerte
9. Happy Pills (Gimme Gimme)
10. Rip Like Cat Claws
11. What If...
12. Inner Exploration

Disc 2

1. Gaza Strip (March Of The Innocent)
2. Suicide Bombers (Album Edit)
3. Carry Me (2006)
4. Empty Space
5. Junkie Do – Junkie Die
6. Homophobia
7. This Is Where I Wanna Be (Album Edit)
8. One Man's Gain Another Man's Pain
9. Give Us Some Shelter (Katrina)
10. One For One For One
11. I Was Born That Day
12. Leæther Strip Part 3 (Symphony For Kurt)
