= The Giant Minutes to the Dawn =

Studio album by Leaether Strip
- Released: 2007
- Genres: Industrial, electro-industrial, EBM
- Label: Alfa Matrix

Leaether Strip chronology
After the Devastation (2005)	The Giant Minutes to the Dawn (2007)	Civil Disobedience (2008)

Professional ratings
Review scores
Source	Rating
Metal.de	7/10

The Giant Minutes to the Dawn is an album by Leaether Strip. Some editions of the album included the bonus EP The Hourglass.

== Track listing ==
1. "Will the Sun Return?"
2. "Dirty Little Secret"
3. "Sedated Nation"
4. "Commotio"
5. "The Trouble"
6. "Go Ahead"
7. "Caught in the Headlights"
8. "Kill the Predator"
9. "Blah Blah Blah"
10. "Crucify Them"
11. "This Age of Neglect"
12. "Seconds Last Forever"
13. "Annie"
