= Underneath the Laughter =

Studio album by Leæther Strip
- Released: 1993
- Genre: Electro-industrial, industrial
- Label: Zoth Ommog

Leæther Strip chronology
Solitary Confinement (1992)	Underneath the Laughter (1993)	Serenade for the Dead (1994)

Underneath the Laughter is a 1993 Leæther Strip album released by Zoth Ommog Records (CD ZOT 103).

== Track listing ==
1. "Turn to Stone"
2. "Another World"
3. "We Will Follow"
4. "Don't Tame Your Soul"
5. "Atheistic Sermon"
6. "Prying Eyes"
7. "World's End"
8. "Another Leader"
9. "The White Disgrace"
