= Ængelmaker =

Studio album by Leæther Strip
- Released: March 27, 2009
- Genre: Industrial, EBM
- Label: Alfa Matrix

Leæther Strip chronology
Civil Disobedience (2008)	Ængelmaker (2009)

Ængelmaker is the twelfth studio album by Danish electro-industrial musical project Leæther Strip. It was released on March 27, 2009.

Some editions of the album include the bonus EP Yes, I'm Limited Vol. IV.

== Track listing ==
Disc 1

1. Ængelmaker
2. Anger
3. I Can't Sit Still
4. Strap Me Down Again
5. We Are Dust
6. Genetic Fuckup
7. Lili Marlene
8. White Flag
9. Dying To Live
10. When You're Inside Me
11. Black Celebration (Depeche Mode cover)

Disc 2

1. Stolen Feæthers
2. Insect Warrior
3. I Will Never Hurt You Again
4. Treatment
5. Before I Fade
6. La Danse Macabre
7. Don't You Dare Die On Me
8. Spinning
9. So Hard They Fall
10. Deliver Me (The Beloved cover)
11. Blasphemous Rumours (Depeche Mode cover)

Disc 3 (bonus disc)

1. Leæther Strip feat Unter Null: Don't You Want Me (Human League cover)
2. Law of Jante 09 (Golem mix)
3. Lovehate
4. Leæther Strip vs. Supreme Court: Europa
5. Leæther Strip vs. Titans: Deadhead
6. Leæther Strip vs. Supreme court: Overkill
7. Back in control (Bigger mix)
8. Go ahead 09 (Hungarian club version)
9. One nine eight two (Obamarama club mix)
10. Snakebite (Black Mamba mix)
11. Pain is beautiful (freemixxx)
12. Genetic fuckup (Nostalgia mix)
