= Double or Nothing (Leaether Strip album) =

Compilation album by Leaether Strip
- Released: 1995
- Genre: Industrial, EBM
- Label: Zoth Ommog

Leaether Strip chronology
Fit for Flogging (1993)	Double or Nothing (1995)	Getting Away With Murder: Murders from 1982 to 1995 (1995)

Double or Nothing is a two-disc compilation album that contains the Positive Depression EP as disc 1 and a handful of other rarities on disc 2.

== Track listing ==
Disc 1 (Positive Depression)

1. Torture (A Suicide Note)
2. We Deserve It all
3. Dead On Arrival
4. Don't Tame Your Soul (Spoken Version)

Disc 2

1. Crash Flight 232 (Body Rapture 1 Compilation)
2. Battleground (KGB Slam) (Body Rapture 1 Compilation)
3. G.A.W.M. (Remix) (Technopolis 3 Compilation)
4. Leæther Strip Part II (The Pleasure of Penetration)
5. Japanese Bodies (12" Mix) (Japanese Bodies)
6. Razor Blades (Go Berzerk) (The Pleasure of Penetration)
7. Adrenalin Rush (Vegger Version) (Zoth In Your Mind Compilation)
8. Touchdown Breakdown (The Pleasure of Penetration)
9. Leæther Strip Part II (1988) (Material)
10. Die - Die - Die (Completely Dead Version) (Material)
11. Body Machine Body (Live) (Material)
12. Japanese Bodies (Live) (Material)
13. Razor Blades (Live) (Material)
