= Satanic Reasons: The Very Best Of =

Greatest hits album by Leæther Strip
- Released: 2005
- Genre: Industrial, EBM
- Label: Alfa Matrix

Leæther Strip chronology
Retrospective (1997)	Satanic Reasons: The Very Best Of (2005)

Satanic Reasons: The Very Best Of is a best-of compilation by Leæther Strip.

== Track listing ==
All tracks are written by Claus Larsen.

Disc 1
No.	Title	Length
1.	"Japanese Bodies (12" Version)"	4:39
2.	"Laæther Strip Part II"	4:08
3.	"Break My Back"	4:14
4.	"Fit For Flogging"	5:22
5.	"AntiUS"	4:46
6.	"Nose Candy"	4:42
7.	"Steal"	4:03
8.	"Mortal Thoughts"	5:22
9.	"Strap Me Down"	5:36
10.	"Nothing Seen - Nothing Done"	4:52
11.	"Evil Speaks"	3:51
12.	"Adrenalin Rush"	5:05
13.	"Turn To Stone"	5:24
14.	"Don't Tame Your Soul"	5:37
15.	"Torture (A Suicide Note)"	5:54

Disc 2
No.	Title	Writer(s)	Length
1.	"Down There With You"	Claus Larsen	6:21
2.	"No Rest For The Wicked"	Claus Larsen	5:32
3.	"You Know Where To Put It"	Claus Larsen	4:22
4.	"Lies To Tell"	Claus Larsen	5:41
5.	"How Do I Know?"	Claus Larsen	5:25
6.	"I Want You Hard"	Claus Larsen	4:24
7.	"Make My Blood Boil"	Claus Larsen	4:45
8.	"Hate Me!"	Claus Larsen	4:02
9.	"Black Candle!"	Claus Larsen	5:06
10.	"Face The Fire"	Claus Larsen	5:49
11.	"Tell Me What To Do!"	Claus Larsen	4:31
12.	"Under My Control"	Claus Larsen	4:26
13.	"Showroom Dummies"	Ralf Hütter	4:54
14.	"Desert Storm"	Claus Larsen	3:18
15.	"I Wanna Fuck Now!"	Claus Larsen	4:28
