= Science for the Satanic Citizen =

Studio album by Leæther Strip
- Released: 1990
- Label: Zoth Ommog

Leæther Strip chronology
The Pleasure of Penetration (1990)	Science for the Satanic Citizen (1990)	Solitary Confinement (1992)

Science for the Satanic Citizen is a 1990 album by Leæther Strip, released by Zoth Ommog. It incorporates a number of samples from films, including Hellraiser.

== Track listing ==
1. "Zyklon B"
2. "G.A.W.M."
3. "Rotation (Axis Off)"
4. "Satanic Citizen"
5. "What's Hell Really Like?"
6. "Law of Jante"

CD bonus tracks:

1. "Cast-away"
2. "Torment Me"

"The Law of Jante" is Leæther Strip's first (and only until his 2005 comeback) song in Danish. It features a reading of the Jante Law from Aksel Sandemose's book En flygtning krydser sit spor.
