= Zero Mostel =

American actor (1915–1977)

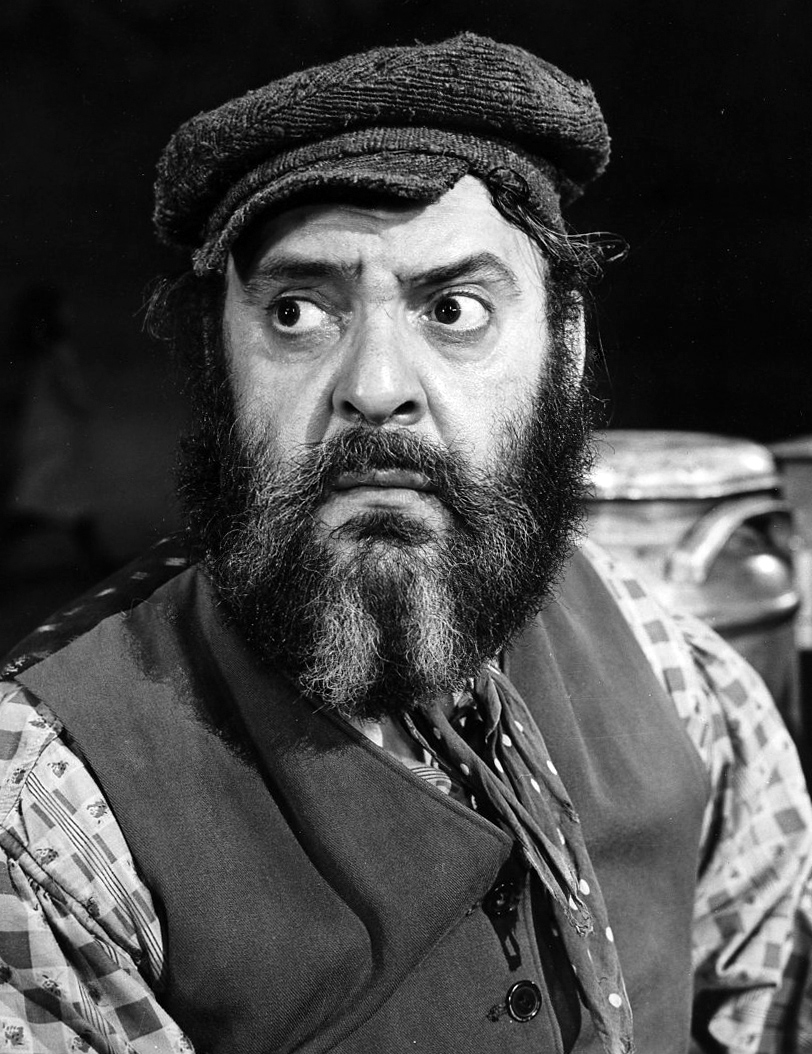
- Mostel in Fiddler on the Roof, 1964
- Born: Samuel Joel Mostel; February 28, 1915; Brooklyn, New York City, U.S.
- Died: September 8, 1977 (aged 62); Philadelphia, Pennsylvania, U.S.
- Education: City College of New York; New York University
- Occupations: Actor; comedian; singer
- Years active: 1941–1977
- Spouses: Clara Sverd (m. 1939; div. 1944); Kate Harkin (m. 1944)
- Children: 2, including Josh

Samuel Joel "Zero" Mostel (February 28, 1915 – September 8, 1977) was an American actor, comedian, and singer. Mostel received three Tony Awards and a Drama Desk Award as well as nominations for a British Academy Film Award and a Golden Globe Award. He is also a member of the American Theater Hall of Fame, inducted posthumously in 1979.

Mostel is best known for his portrayal of comic characters, including Leopold Bloom in Marjorie Barkentin's Ulysses in Nighttown, Tevye in Fiddler on the Roof, Pseudolus on stage and on screen in A Funny Thing Happened on the Way to the Forum and Max Bialystock in Mel Brooks's The Producers (1967). Mostel was a student of Don Richardson and he used an acting technique based on muscle memory.

Mostel was blacklisted during the 1950s; his testimony before the House Un-American Activities Committee was well publicized. Mostel starred in the Hollywood Blacklist drama The Front (1976) alongside Woody Allen, for which Mostel was nominated for the British Academy Film Award for Best Supporting Actor. His final roles included a guest spot on The Muppet Show and a voice in Watership Down (1978). As described in The New York Times, "Mr. Mostel was the actor's actor, the critic's actor and, perhaps most important, the theatergoer's actor."

== Early life and education ==
Samuel Joel Mostel was born in Brooklyn, New York, to Israel Mostel and Tzina Druchs (also spelled Cina, known as Celia), both Ashkenazi Jewish immigrants from Galicia. His father was born in Dziewiętniki, then in Austria-Hungary, later in Poland, and now in Lviv Oblast, Ukraine. He emigrated to the United States in 1898 with his first wife, Esther Wirklich Mostel, and young daughter, Celia. They would have three more children – Hyman, Sarah (Sadie), and Benjamin – before her death in 1908. His mother, Tzina, grew up in Vienna, Austria, and immigrated in 1906. Israel had five more children with Tzina: Morris, Milton, Aaron, Samuel (later known as Zero), and William.

Study in Black and Green, Mostel's favorite painting, which he frequently copied

As a child, he earned the nickname "Zero" from his classmates to match his poor grades. He kept the moniker when he went into show business, though his mother hated it. Initially living in the Brownsville section of Brooklyn, the family moved to Moodus, Connecticut, where they bought a farm. The family's income in those days came from a winery and a slaughterhouse. The farm failed, and the family moved back to New York, where his father obtained work as a wine chemist. Zero was described by his family as outgoing and lively, and with a developed sense of humor. He showed an intelligence and perception which convinced his father he had the makings of a rabbi, but Zero preferred painting and drawing, a passion he retained for life.

According to Roger Butterfield, Zero's mother sent him to the Metropolitan Museum of Art to copy paintings while dressed in a velvet suit. Zero had a favorite painting, John White Alexander's Study in Black and Green, which he copied every day, to the delight of the gallery crowds. One afternoon, while a crowd was watching over his velvet-clad shoulder, he solemnly copied the whole painting upside down, delighting his audience. In addition to English, Zero Mostel spoke Yiddish, Italian, and German. He attended Public School 188, where he was an A student. He also received professional training as a painter through The Educational Alliance. He completed his high school education at Seward Park High School, where his yearbook noted: "A future Rembrandt…or perhaps a comedian?". He attended the City College of New York, a public college that allowed many poor students to pursue higher education. He later claimed that he was on the swimming team and the Reserve Officers Training Corps, though the claim is dubious. As only beginner classes were available in art, Mostel took them repeatedly to be able to paint and receive professional feedback. During the time he worked odd jobs. He graduated in 1935 with a bachelor's degree. He then continued studying towards a master's degree at New York University before leaving after a year to find work. He then joined the Public Works of Art Project (PWAP), which paid him a stipend to teach art.

== Career ==
=== 1941–1949: Early comic routines ===
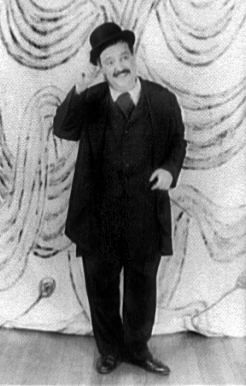
Mostel as Leopold Bloom in Ulysses in Nighttown in 1958

Part of Mostel's duty with the Public Works of Art Project (PWAP) was to give gallery talks at New York's museums. In 1941, the Café Society, a downtown Manhattan nightclub, hired Mostel as a professional comedian to play regularly there, where he adopted the stage name Zero. Mostel's rise professionally was rapid. In 1942, his salary at the Café Society went up from $40 a week to $450; he appeared on radio shows, opened in two Broadway shows (Keep Them Laughing, Top-Notchers), played at the Paramount Theatre, appeared in an MGM movie (Du Barry Was a Lady), and booked into La Martinique at $4,000 a week. He also made cameo appearances at the Yiddish theatre, which influenced his performance style. In 1943 Life magazine described him as "just about the funniest American now living". In March 1943, Mostel was drafted by the US Army. Although he gave varying accounts of his Army service, records show he was honorably discharged in August 1943 because of an unspecified physical disability. He entertained servicemen giving USO performances until 1945.

After Zero's discharge from the Army, he resumed his earlier career. He appeared in a series of plays, musicals, operas, and movies. In 1946 he even made an attempt at serious operatic acting in The Beggar's Opera, but received lukewarm reviews. He sang the title role in a short film of Puccini's comic opera Gianni Schicchi. Critics saw him as a versatile performer.

Zero Mostel made notable appearances on New York City television in the late 1940s. He had his own show in 1948 called Off The Record on WABD with comedian partner Joey Faye. Simultaneously, Mostel had a live TV show on WPIX, Channel Zero. He also appeared in the May 11, 1949 Toast of the Town broadcast hosted by Ed Sullivan.

=== 1950–1956: Blacklist years and HUAC testimony ===
Mostel had been a leftist since college and his nightclub routine included political jabs at right-wingers. His MGM contract was terminated, and his role in Du Barry Was a Lady was truncated, because studio executives were upset that he participated in protests against another MGM film, Tennessee Johnson, which protesters believed had downplayed the racism of former US President Andrew Johnson. According to biographer Arthur Sainer, "MGM blacklisted Zero Mostel way before the days of the blacklist". During his Army service he was under investigation for alleged Communist Party membership. The Military Intelligence Division of the U.S. War Department said it was "reliably reported" that he was a Communist Party member. The Post Intelligence Officer at the Army's Camp Croft, where Mostel served, believed that Mostel was "definitely a Communist." As a result of that, his application to be an entertainment director with the US Army Special Services unit was denied. Mostel had lobbied hard to transfer to Special Services, at one point traveling to Washington to request a transfer.

It was not until 1950 that Mostel again acted in movies, for a role in the Oscar-winning film Panic in the Streets, at the request of its director, Elia Kazan. Kazan describes his attitude and feelings during that period, where

Each director has a favorite in his cast... my favorite this time was Zero Mostel—but not to bully. I thought him an extraordinary artist and a delightful companion, one of the funniest and most original men I'd ever met... I constantly sought his company... He was one of the three people whom I rescued from the "industry's" blacklist... For a long time, Zero had not been able to get work in films, but I got him in my film.

Mostel played supporting roles in five movies for Twentieth Century Fox in 1950, all in films released in 1951. Fox then abruptly cancelled his contract. Mostel learned this after he was lent out to Columbia for a film role but not permitted on the set. The studio may have received word that he was about to be named as a Communist in Congressional testimony.

On January 29, 1952, Martin Berkeley identified Mostel to the House Un-American Activities Committee (HUAC) as having been a member of the Communist Party. After the testimony he was effectively blacklisted. He was subpoenaed to appear before HUAC on August 14, 1955. Mostel declined to name names and jousted with the members of Congress, invoked the Fifth Amendment, while standing up for his right to the privacy of his personal political beliefs. His testimony won him admiration in the blacklisted community, and in addition to not naming names he also confronted the committee on ideological matters, something that was rarely done. Among other things, he referred to Twentieth Century Fox as "18th Century Fox" (due to its collaboration with the committee), and manipulated the committee members to make them appear foolish. Mostel later commented: “My politics are my business. Besides, what sabotage could actors be accused of—giving acting secrets to the enemy?”

Segment of Zero Mostel's testimony before HUAC

MR. JACKSON: Mr. Chairman, may I say that I can think of no greater way to parade one's political beliefs than to appear under the auspices of Mainstream, a Communist publication...

MR. MOSTEL: I appreciate your opinion very much, but I do want to say that – I don't know, you know – I still stand on pay grounds, and maybe it is unwise and unpolitic of me to say this. If I appeared there, what if I did an imitation of a butterfly at rest? There is no crime in making anybody laugh ... I don't care if you laugh at me.

MR. JACKSON: If your interpretation of a butterfly at rest brought any money into the coffers of the Communist Party, you contributed directly to the propaganda effort of the Communist Party.

MR. MOSTEL: Suppose I had the urge to do the butterfly at rest somewhere.

MR. DOYLE: Yes, but please, when you have the urge, don't have such an urge to put the butterfly at rest by putting money in the Communist Party coffers as a result of that urge to put the butterfly at rest.

— HUAC Hearing, Oct. 14, 1955.

The admiration he received for his testimony did nothing to take him off the blacklist and the family had to struggle throughout the 1950s with little income. Mostel used this time to work in his studio. Later he said that he cherished those years for the time it had afforded him to do what he loved most. Mostel's appearance before the HUAC (as well as others) was incorporated into Eric Bentley's 1972 play Are You Now or Have You Ever Been...? During this period he also appeared in many regional productions of shows such as Peter Pan (as Captain Hook) and Kismet (as the Wazir), with his name seen prominently in the advertising.

=== 1957–1969: Broadway stardom ===
In 1957, Toby Cole, a New York theatrical agent who strongly opposed the blacklist, contacted Mostel and asked to represent him. Mostel agreed, and the partnership revived Mostel's career and made him a household name. He was Leopold Bloom in Marjorie Barkentin's Ulysses in Nighttown, based on an episode in James Joyce's Ulysses, a novel he greatly admired. It was an Off-Off-Broadway play produced in a small Houston Street theater, but the reviews he received were overwhelmingly favorable.Newsweek's Jack Kroll wrote, "Something unbelievable happened. A fat comedian named Zero Mostel gave a performance that was even more astonishing than Olivier's". Mostel received the Obie award for best Off Broadway performance of the 1958–59 season. After the success of Ulysses, Mostel received many offers to appear in classic roles, especially abroad; he declined the offers because of artistic differences with the directors and the low salaries associated with the roles. By that time the effects of the blacklist were lessening, and in 1959 and 1961 he appeared in two episodes of TV's The Play of the Week.

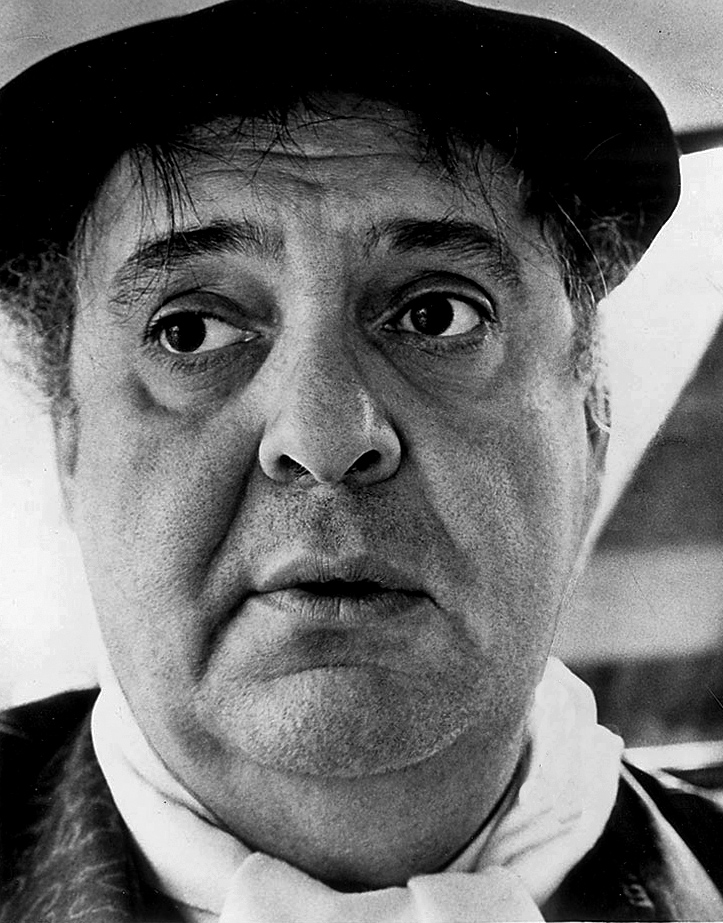
Mostel, c. 1960

On January 13, 1960, while exiting a taxi on his way back from rehearsals for the play The Good Soup, Mostel was hit by a number 18 (now the M86) 86th Street crosstown bus, and his leg was crushed. The doctors wanted to amputate the leg, which would have ended his stage career. Mostel refused, accepting the risk of gangrene, and remained hospitalized for four months. The injury took a huge toll; for the rest of his life, the massively-scarred leg gave him pain and required frequent rests and baths. He sought compensation for the injury by retaining the famous Harry Lipsig (the 5'3" self-described "King of Torts") as his attorney. The case was settled for an undisclosed sum. From this time forward, whenever he attended the Metropolitan Opera, Mostel carried a cane to go along with the cape that he also favored. Later that year Mostel played Estragon in a TV adaptation of Samuel Beckett's Waiting for Godot.

In 1961, he played Jean in Eugene Ionesco's Rhinoceros to rave reviews. The New Republic's Robert Brustein said Mostel had "a great dancer's control of movement, a great actor's control of voice, a great mime's control of facial expressions." His transition onstage from man to rhinoceros became a thing of legend; he won his first Tony Award for Best Actor in a Play. In 1962 Mostel began work on the role of Pseudolus in Stephen Sondheim's A Funny Thing Happened on the Way to the Forum, which was to be one of his best-remembered roles. The role of Pseudolus was originally offered to Phil Silvers, who declined it, saying he did not want to do this "old shtick". Mostel did not originally want to do the role either, which he thought below his capabilities, but was convinced by his wife and agent. The reviews were excellent, and, after a few slow weeks after which the play was partially rewritten with a new opening song, "Comedy Tonight", which became the play's most popular piece, the show became a great commercial success, running 964 performances and conferring star status on Mostel. He won a Tony Award for Best Actor in a Musical for this role. A film version was produced in 1966, also starring Mostel and Silvers.

In 1964, he was a narrator for the Naumburg Orchestral Concerts, in the Naumburg Bandshell, Central Park, in the summer series. On September 22, 1964, Mostel created the role of Tevye in the original Broadway production of Fiddler on the Roof. Because of Mostel's respect for the works of Sholem Aleichem he insisted that more of the author's mood and style be incorporated into the musical, and he made major contributions to its shape. He also created the cantorial sounds made famous in the song "If I Were a Rich Man". The New York Times wrote "Zero Mostel's Tevye is so penetrating and heartwarming that you all but forget that it is a performance." In later years, the actors who followed Mostel in the role of Tevye invariably followed his staging. The show received rave reviews and ran for 3,242 performances, a record. Mostel received the Tony Award for Best Actor in a Musical for it.

Mostel in 1967 appeared as Potemkin in Great Catherine. He was due to co-star with Julie Newmar in Monsieur Lecoq filmed in France and the U.K., but the film was never completed.

=== The Producers ===
Mel Brooks cast Mostel as Max Bialystock in The Producers (1967). Bialystock and his partner, Leo Bloom (Gene Wilder), are Broadway producers who plan to produce a flop, as "the IRS isn't interested in flops." Mostel initially balked at the role, but Brooks persuaded him to show the script to his wife, and she talked him into doing it. Upon release, the film received mixed reviews.but has achieved classic status. Roger Ebert included it in his canon of Great Movies, calling Mostel's performance "a masterpiece of low comedy."

=== 1970–1977: Later work and final roles ===
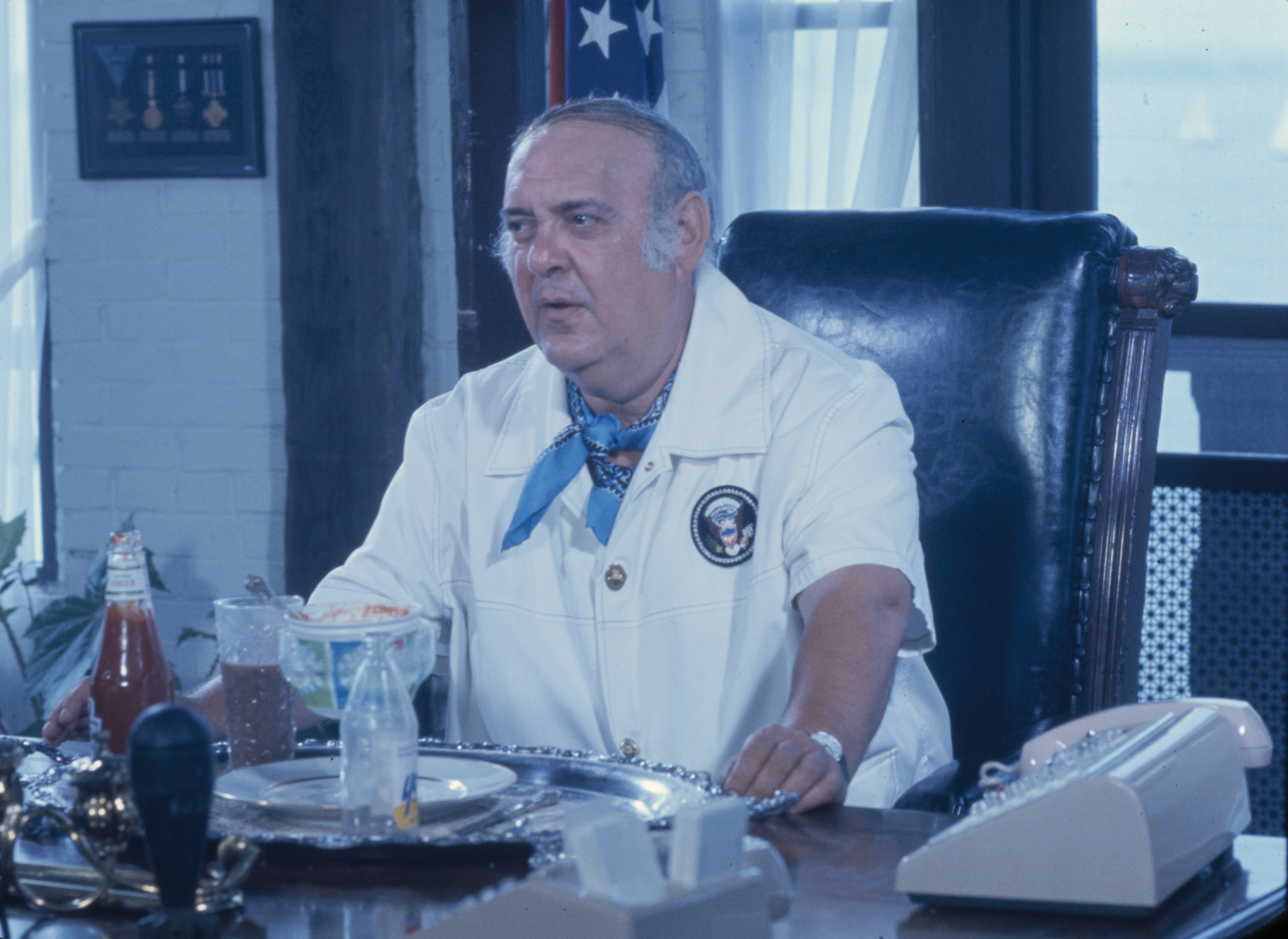
Zero Mostel in 1973 on the set of the film Fore Play

In his last decade, Mostel's star dimmed as he appeared in movies that were received with indifference by both critics and audiences. These titles include The Great Bank Robbery and Once Upon a Scoundrel. In the 1970s, he often played supporting rather than lead roles. He was in Peter Yates's The Hot Rock (1972) and the 1974 film version of Rhinoceros (with Wilder). He played Hecky Brown, a blacklisted actor, alongside Woody Allen in Martin Ritt's The Front. Screenwriter Walter Bernstein loosely based Brown on television actor Philip Loeb, who was a friend of Mostel. On Broadway, he starred in revivals of Ulysses in Nighttown (receiving a Tony nomination for Best Actor) and Fiddler on the Roof. He made memorable appearances in children's shows such as Sesame Street, The Electric Company (for which he performed the Spellbinder in the Letterman cartoons), and gave voice to the boisterous seagull Kehaar in Watership Down (1978). He also appeared as a guest star during Season 2 of The Muppet Show, taped during mid-1977 and broadcast after his death.

== Personal life ==
=== Marriages ===
In 1939, Mostel married Clara Sverd, and the couple moved to an apartment in Brooklyn. The marriage did not last, however, since Clara could not accept the many hours Mostel spent in his studio with his fellow artists, and he did not seem to be able to provide for her at the level to which she had been accustomed. They separated in 1941 and divorced in 1944, Clara only agreeing to the divorce in return for a percentage of Mostel's earnings for the rest of his life. The arrangement lasted until the mid-1950s.

Mostel lived in a large rented apartment in The Belnord on the Upper West Side of Manhattan and built a summer house on Monhegan Island in Maine.

On July 2, 1944, Mostel married Kathryn (Kate) Cecilia Harkin, an actress and dancer, after two years of courtship. The pair met at Radio City Music Hall where she was a Rockette. The marriage caused problems in his relationship with his Orthodox Jewish parents: his new wife was not Jewish. His mother never met Kate nor her grandsons. The marriage had problems at times, again mostly due to Mostel spending most of his time in his art studio. Their relationship was described by friends of the family as complicated, with many fights but having mutual adoration. The couple stayed together until Mostel's death; they had two children, film actor Josh Mostel in 1946 and Tobias in 1948. Kate Mostel survived her husband, dying in 1986.

=== Death ===
In the last four months of his life, Mostel took on a mostly liquid diet (later described by his friends as a starvation diet) that reduced his weight from 304 pounds (138 kg) to 215 pounds (98 kg). During rehearsals for Arnold Wesker's new play The Merchant (in which Mostel played a reimagined version of Shakespeare's Shylock) in Philadelphia, he collapsed in his dressing room and was taken to Thomas Jefferson University Hospital. He was diagnosed with a respiratory disorder; it was believed he was in no danger and would be released soon. However, on September 8, 1977, Mostel complained of dizziness and lost consciousness. The attending physicians were unable to revive him, and he was pronounced dead that evening. It is believed that he suffered an aortic aneurysm. Wesker wrote a book chronicling the out-of-town tribulations that beset the play and culminated in Zero's death called The Birth of Shylock and the Death of Zero Mostel.

In accordance with his final requests, his family did not stage any funeral or other memorial service. Mostel was cremated following his death; the location of his ashes is not publicly known.

== Reception and collaborations ==
Mostel often collided with directors and other performers in the course of his career. He was described as irreverent, believing himself to be a comic genius (many critics agreed) and showed little patience for incompetence. He often improvised, which was received well by audiences but which often left other performers (who were not prepared for his ad-libbed lines) confused and speechless during live performances. He often dominated the stage whether or not his role called for it. Norman Jewison stated this as a reason for preferring Chaim Topol for the role of Tevye in the film adptation of Fiddler on the Roof. Mostel took exception to these criticisms:

There's a kind of silliness in the theater about what one contributes to a show. The producer obviously contributes the money…but must the actor contribute nothing at all? I'm not a modest fellow about those things. I contribute a great deal. And they always manage to hang you for having an interpretation. Isn't [the theater] where your imagination should flower? Why must it always be dull as shit?

Other producers, such as Jerome Robbins and Hal Prince, preferred to hire Mostel on short contracts, knowing that he would become less faithful to the script as time went on. His exuberant personality, though largely responsible for his success, had also intimidated others in his profession and prevented him from receiving some important roles. In his autobiography Kiss Me Like a Stranger, Gene Wilder describes being initially terrified of Mostel. However, just after being introduced, Mostel got up, walked over to Wilder, hugged him, and planted a big kiss on his lips. Wilder claims to be grateful to Mostel for teaching him such a valuable lesson, and for picking Wilder up every day so that they could ride to work together. He also tells the story of a dinner celebrating the release of The Producers. Mostel switched Wilder's place card with Dick Shawn's, allowing Wilder to sit at the main table. Mostel and Wilder later worked together in Rhinoceros and the Letterman cartoons for The Electric Company. The two remained close friends until Mostel's death.

Mostel was the subject of the play Zero Hour (2006), written and performed by actor/playwright Jim Brochu. It recounts events from Mostel's life and career, including his HUAC testimony, his professional relationships and his theatrical work.

Clive Barnes, reviewing Ulysses in Nightotown, wrote

It is part of Mr. Mostel's power that he can play a deflated sack of flour with human dignity, and he can make grotesque faces that suggest pain more than humor. His shambling aggressiveness is vulnerable from the start, and that mustache, that effort to make an aging cherub into an aging satyr never fools anyone. And the voice, mellifluous, and yet always with a slice of irony under its tongue, is as expressive as the upturned eyes, the overemphasized gestures. Some actors use outrageous tricks to disguise themselves; Mr. Mostel uses them to define himself.

== Acting credits ==
=== Film ===
Year	Title	Role	Notes
1943	Du Barry Was a Lady	Rami, the Swami/Taliostra	
1950	Panic in the Streets	Raymond Fitch	
1951	The Enforcer	Big Babe Lazick	
1951	Sirocco	Balukjiaan	
1951	Mr. Belvedere Rings the Bell	Emmett	
1951	The Guy Who Came Back	Boots Mullins	
1951	The Model and the Marriage Broker	George Wixted	
1966	A Funny Thing Happened on the Way to the Forum	Pseudolus	
1967	Children of the Exodus	Narrator	short film
1967	Monsieur Lecoq	Max Lecoq	
1967	The Producers	Max Bialystock	
1968	Great Catherine	Potemkin	
1969	The Great Bank Robbery	Rev. Pious Blue	
1970	The Angel Levine	Morris Mishkin	
1972	The Hot Rock	Abe Greenberg	
1973	Marco	Kublai Khan	
1974	Rhinoceros	John	
1974	Once Upon a Scoundrel	Carlos del Refugio	
1975	Fore Play	President/Don Pasquale	
1975	Journey into Fear	Kopelkin	
1976	Mastermind	Inspector Hoku Ichihara	
1976	The Front	Hecky Brown	
1976	Hollywood on Trial	Himself	Documentary
1978	Watership Down	Kehaar (voice)	Final role; released posthumously
1979	Best Boy	Himself	Documentary

=== Television ===
Year	Title	Role	Notes
1948	Off the Record	Performer	2 episodes
1949	Ford Theatre	Banjo	Episode: "The Man Who Came to Dinner"
1959	Zero Mostel	Various Characters	Television movie
1959	The Play of the Week	Melamed	Episode: "The World of Sholom Aleichem"
1961	The Play of the Week	Estragon	Episode: "Waiting for Godot"
1970	Rowan & Martin's Laugh-In	Guest Performer	2 episodes
1971	The Flip Wilson Show	Guest Performer	1 episode
1972–1977	The Electric Company	Spell Binder (voice)	650 episodes
1973	Old Faithful	Park Ranger	Television musical
1976	The Little Drummer Boy, Book II	Brutus (voice)	Television special
1978	The Muppet Show	Himself – Guest Star	Episode: "Zero Mostel"; aired posthumously

=== Theater ===
Year	Title	Role	Venue
1942	Cafe Crown	Patron	Cort Theatre, Broadway
1942	Keep 'em Laughing	Performer	44th Street Theatre, Broadway
1942	Top-Notchers	Performer	44th Street Theatre, Broadway
1945	Concert Varieties	Performer	Ziegfeld Theatre, Broadway
1946	Beggar's Holiday	Hamilton Peachum	Broadway Theatre, Broadway
1952	Flight into Egypt	Glubb	Music Box Theatre, Broadway
1954	Lunatics and Lovers	Dan Cupid (replaced Buddy Hackett)	Broadhurst Theatre, Broadway
1956	The Good Women of Szechwan	Mr. Shu Fu	Phoenix Theatre, Off-Broadway
1957	Good as Gold	Doc Penny	Belasco Theatre, Broadway
1958	Ulysses in Nighttown	Leopold Bloom	Rooftop Theatre, Off-Broadway
1960	The Good Soup	The Croupier	Plymouth Theatre, Broadway
1961	Rhinoceros	John	Longacre Theatre, Broadway
1962	A Funny Thing Happened on the Way to the Forum	Prologus/Pseudolus	Alvin Theatre, Broadway
1964	Fiddler on the Roof	Tevye	Imperial Theatre, Broadway
1971	Fiddler on the Roof	Tevye	Majestic Theatre, Broadway
1974	Ulysses in Nighttown	Leopold Bloom	Rooftop Theatre, Off-Broadway
1976	Fiddler on the Roof	Tevye	Winter Garden Theatre, Broadway

== Awards and nominations ==
Organizations	Year	Category	Work	Result	Ref.
British Academy Film Awards	1977	Best Actor in a Supporting Role	The Front	Nominated	
Drama Desk Award	1974	Outstanding Actor in a Play	Ulysses in Nighttown	Won	
Golden Globe Awards	1968	Best Actor – Motion Picture Musical or Comedy	The Producers	Nominated	
Laurel Awards	1967	Male New Face		7th place	
Outer Critics Circle Award	1965	Outstanding Actor in a Musical	Fiddler on the Roof	Won	
Tony Awards	1961	Best Leading Actor in a Play	Rhinoceros	Won	
Tony Awards	1963	Best Leading Actor in a Musical	A Funny Thing Happened on the Way to the Forum	Won	
Tony Awards	1965	Best Leading Actor in a Musical	Fiddler on the Roof	Won	
Tony Awards	1974	Best Leading Actor in a Play	Ulysses in Nighttown	Nominated	

== Bibliography ==
- Zero Mostel Reads A Book Photographs by Robert Frank (New York Times, 1963)
- Zero Mostel's Book of Villains [with Israel Shenker, photographs by Alex Gotfryd] (Doubleday, 1976)

== Sources ==
- Zero Mostel: a Biography (1989), Jared Brown, Atheneum, NY (ISBN 0-689-11955-0)
- Isenberg, Barbara (2014). Tradition!: The Highly Improbable, Ultimately Triumphant Broadway-to-Hollywood Story of Fiddler on the Roof, the World's Most Beloved Musical. New York: St. Martin's Press. ISBN 978-0-312-59142-7.
