= Legacy of Hate and Lust =

Studio album by Leæther Strip
- Released: 1995
- Genres: Industrial, EBM, dark wave
- Label: Zoth Ommog

Leæther Strip chronology
Serenade for the Dead (1994)	Legacy of Hate and Lust (1995)	The Rebirth of Agony (1996)

Professional ratings
Review scores
Source	Rating
Visions.de	6/12

Legacy of Hate and Lust is the 6th album by Leæther Strip.

== Track listing ==
1. Down There With You
2. We Need a Life
3. The Darkness Ends the Day
4. I Wanna Hate You
5. We're Losing Time
6. Whisper Your Poetry
7. Come Out Tonight
8. I Won't Look Back
9. I Try - I Die
10. No Rest for the Wicked
11. 13/6 - 1994
