= Israel Shenker =

American journalist (1925–2007)

- Born: January 6, 1925 Philadelphia, Pennsylvania, U.S.
- Died: June 9, 2007 (aged 82) Israel
- Occupation: Journalist, author
- Education: University of Pennsylvania; University of Paris
- Spouse: Mary Sagman (m. 1951; died 2005)
- Children: 2

Israel Shenker (January 6, 1925 – June 9, 2007) was an American reporter for Time Magazine and The New York Times. He was an author of numerous books about language, lexicography, and Jewish life.

== Life ==
Shenker was born in Philadelphia on January 6, 1925. Shenker enrolled at the University of Pennsylvania (UPenn) for college but interrupted his studies to serve with the Army Air Corps in World War II. Following his military service, he returned to UPenn and completed his bachelor's degree in philosophy in 1947. Shenker then studied briefly at the Sorbonne in Paris before embarking on his career as a journalist. In 1951 Shenker married Mary Sagman, with whom he had two children named Susie and Mark. Following his retirement from journalism, the couple moved to Mary Shenker's native Scotland, where he continued to write. After her death in 2005 he moved to Israel, where his daughter lived. He died in Israel in 2007.

== Journalism ==
Shenker spent nearly 20 years as a Europe-based correspondent for Time Magazine, including serving as the magazine's Moscow reporter until the U.S.S.R. expelled him in 1964. From 1968 to 1979, Shenker was a reporter on the metropolitan staff of The New York Times. His true strengths as a reporter were on display in his profiles and interviews of interesting or prominent individuals. Among the notable figures he interviewed and profiled over the years were Isaac Asimov, Jorge Luis Borges, Fernand Braudel, Noam Chomsky, M. C. Escher, Al Hirschfeld, John Kenneth Galbraith, Graham Greene, Alf Landon, Marcel Marceau, Groucho Marx, Vladimir Nabokov, S. J. Perelman, Pablo Picasso, Menachem Mendel Schneerson, Isaac Bashevis Singer, and Aleksandr Solzhenitsyn.

In the latter half of his career, Shenker was known in particular for his coverage of letters, lexicography and languages, especially Yiddish, to which he retained an ardent lifelong attachment. In later years, in ostensible retirement, he wrote freelance articles for The New York Times on European travel. His work also appeared in other magazines from Sports Illustrated to American Heritage, and he intermittently authored "Talk of the Town" pieces and other articles for The New Yorker from the 1960s to the 1980s.

== Published work ==
- As Good as Golda : The Warmth and Wisdom of Israel's Prime Minister [Golda Meir; compiled and edited by Israel Shenker and Mary Shenker] (McCall, 1970)
- Words and Their Masters (Doubleday, 1974)
- Zero Mostel's Book of Villains [co-authored with Zero Mostel] (Doubleday, 1976)
- Noshing is Sacred: The Joys and Oys of Jewish Food (Bobbs-Merrill, 1979)
- Harmless Drudges: Wizards of Language: Ancient, Medieval and Modern (Barnhart Books, 1979)
- In the Footsteps of Johnson and Boswell (Houghton Mifflin, 1982)
- Coat of Many Colors: Pages From Jewish Life (Doubleday, 1985).
