= Civil Disobedience (album) =

Studio album by Leæther Strip
- Released: April 11, 2008
- Genre: Electro-industrial
- Label: Alfa Matrix

Leæther Strip chronology
The Giant Minutes to the Dawn (2007)	Civil Disobedience (2008)	Ængelmaker (2009)

Civil Disobedience is the eleventh studio album by Danish electro-industrial musical project Leæther Strip. The limited release of the album included the bonus CD One Nine Eight Two.

Peter Marks of Release Magazine rated it a 9 out of 10, describing it as "raw, angry, aggressive".

== Track listing ==
=== Disc 1 ===
1. Civil Disobedience
2. The Damaged People
3. When Blood Runs Dark
4. Bite Until You Taste Blood
5. Jagtvej 69
6. Going Nowhere
7. I Said I'm Sorry
8. Pissing On My Territory
9. It Hurts Doesn't It
10. One Day
11. The Devil's Daughter

=== Disc 2 ===
1. A Whore For Jesus
2. I Wear Black On The Inside
3. Machineries Of Joy (Die Krupps cover)
4. Snakebite
5. Soul Collector
6. Could Ya, Did Ya
7. In The Arms Of A Demon
8. One More Reason
9. The Cradle Of Death
10. Stains
11. The Evil In Putin's Eyes
