= The Rebirth of Agony =

Studio album by Leaether Strip
- Released: 1996
- Recorded: ???
- Genre: Electro-industrial, EBM
- Label: Zoth Ommog

Leaether Strip chronology
Legacy of Hate and Lust (1996)	The Rebirth of Agony (1996)	Self-Inflicted (1997)

The Rebirth of Agony is the 7th album by Leæther Strip.

== Track listing ==
1. You Know Where To Put It
2. Life is Painful (Bastard)
3. Switch On - Switch Off
4. Lies to Tell
5. My Mind is My Master
6. How Do I Know?
7. The Edge of Anger
8. I Want You Hard
9. Take Care of Me
10. Anger is a Part of Me
11. Make My Blood Boil
12. Fool!
