= Retrospective (Leaether Strip album) =

Compilation album by Leaether Strip
- Released: 1997
- Genre: Industrial, EBM
- Label: Zoth Ommog

Leaether Strip chronology
Best of Leæther Strip (1996)	Retrospective (1997)	Satanic Reasons: The Very Best Of (2005)

Retrospective is a best-of compilation album released in the US of Leaether Strip.

It was rated four out of five stars by AllMusic.

== Track listing ==
1. Japanese Bodies
2. Zyclon B
3. Anti US (Psycho Strip Edit)
4. How Do I Know
5. Strap Me Down
6. Razor Blades (Go Berzerk)
7. Don't Tame Your Soul
8. No Rest for the Wicked
9. Adrenalin Rush
10. Nosecandy
11. Turn to Stone
12. Face of Evil
13. Take the Fear Away
14. Lies to Tell (Lights of Euphoria Remix)
