= Serenade for the Dead =

Studio album by Leæther Strip
- Released: 1994
- Genre: Industrial music
- Label: Zoth Ommog

Leæther Strip chronology
Underneath the Laughter (1993)	Serenade for the Dead (1994)	Legacy of Hate and Lust (1995)

A 1994 album from Leæther Strip, released by Zoth Ommog Records (cd zot 114). In a dramatic break with his usual aggressive industrial style, this album presents a gloomy electronic "symphony," inspired by the works of Stephen King, James Herbert, Dean R. Koontz and Clive Barker.

== Track listing ==
1. "Serenade for the Dead" 3:53
2. "Black Widow's Kiss" 7:49
3. "Stillborn" 6:07
4. "The Return of the Evil One" 8:30
5. "Black Death" 4:41
6. "New Dark Ages" 6:31
7. "The Corridors of Sleep" 6:55
8. "The Awakening" 9:07
9. "Blood Lust" 6:14
10. "Corpus" 6:30

Extra tracks on double CD:

1. "Til Far"
2. "Reborn"
3. "Serenade for the Dead (Neophyte Mix by Synthetic)"
4. "Serenade For The Dead (Hypnosis Diagnosis Psychosis Editedmix by Synthetic)"
