= Getting Away with Murder (play) =

Getting Away with Murder: A Comedy Thriller
- Cover of the Playbill program
- Original language: English
- Written by: Stephen Sondheim; George Furth
- Characters: Martin Chisholm; Dossie Lustig; Gregory Reed; Pamela Prideaux
- Genre: Whodunit, Comedy, Thriller
- Setting: Suite on the top floor of an old Upper West Side apartment building; the present, October 5

Premiere
- Date: March 17, 1996
- Place: Broadhurst Theatre

Getting Away with Murder is a play written by Stephen Sondheim and George Furth, which ran for 17 performances on Broadway in 1996.

== Overview ==
The action centers on seven well-to-do patients of an eminent psychiatrist meeting for their weekly group therapy session. During a fierce Manhattan thunderstorm, the patients arrive and soon discover that their doctor, Dr. Conrad Bering, has been murdered. Wanting to avoid bad publicity, "the patients conduct their own investigation amid power blackouts, sightings of phantom figures on the terrace outside, and enigmatic messages on the doctor's answering machine." Each of the characters is named based on the seven deadly sins, for example Dossie Lustig and Pamela Prideaux. The building is vacant except for Dr. Bering because it is going to be renovated.

== Background ==
In an interview with Anthony Shaffer, Sondheim shared the background of the play: "In Getting Away With Murder, I started from what I wanted for a first-act curtain. It's hard to talk about it without giving something away. But there is a mystery, there is a solution, and there is, in the truest sense of the word, a detective. It's just that it doesn't manifest itself in the usual way.... I had this plot idea, which I mentioned to George, because I thought it should be sharp and funny and very New York... because the plotting gets fairly complex in the second act, he [Furth] bogged down. So I wrote that act, and then we started to edit each other's stuff. The collaboration became blended as we went over each other's work. I suspect in two years we won't know who wrote which lines. We wrote it for fun. I had never intended or expected that it would get on."

== Production ==
The play premiered on Broadway in previews at the Broadhurst Theatre on February 20, 1996. After 29 previews the show opened on March 17 and closed on March 31 after 17 performances. The cast featured John Rubinstein, Terrence Mann, Christine Ebersole, Jodi Long, Herb Foster (Dr. Conrad Bering), Frankie Faison, Mia Farrow (voice), George Furth (voice), Michelle Hurd, and Josh Mostel.

According to Chris Jones, reviewing a regional production in 1999, the play "had a troubled gestation period, with frantic script changes during the tryout and preview period to change the fate of the murderer."

=== The Doctor Is Out (1995) ===
The play was originally produced in 1995 at the Old Globe Theatre (San Diego) as The Doctor Is Out, from September 10 to October 21, directed by Jack O'Brien. O'Brien remained the director when the show later moved to Broadway.

== Critical response ==
The Variety reviewer wrote of the Old Globe production: "Ultimately though, the focus of this show is on the two authors, who use a conventional murder-mystery form to create a darkly humorous exploration of evil and corruption. You won’t miss the songs from this Sondheim show, but you might just miss the powerful human insight and emotional power of his best shows."

Stefanie Buettner, in commentary for The Sondheim Review wrote: "The actors, who are all about as big a Broadway star as one can be nowadays, make for a terrific ensemble cast, the set is spectacular, and there is even some appropriately creepy background music. The writing is not great prose, but who expects great drama in a thriller? Of course, you have to take this play for what it is: it's not probing into the depth of the human soul, it also won't be in line for the next Pulitzer - but that's fine with me."

== See also ==
- The Last of Sheila
- Sleuth
