= Unlikely Heroes =

U.S. nonprofit organization

- Formation: November 11, 2011; 14 years ago
- Founder: Erica Greve
- Legal status: 501(3)(c) Nonprofit Organization
- Services: Rescue of children, operation of recovery houses, public education
- President: Erica Greve
- Website: unlikelyheroes.com

Unlikely Heroes is an American 501(c)(3) nonprofit organization that rescues, restores, and rehabilitates child victims of sex slavery around the world. Since its founding in 2011 by Erica Greve, Unlikely Heroes has rescued hundreds of children who are then placed in one of their seven residential facilities, each offering rescued children housing, safety, food, medical care, education, life skills training, and therapy.

== History and Organization ==
While attending graduate school in the MSW program at UC-Berkeley, Greve interned as an emergency room social worker for a children's hospital near San Francisco. "It was my job to capture the story of the kids who came through the door," she explained. One story seemed to repeat itself: young girls being forced into sexual slavery and having no way to get help. "I had to go back to [her] mom and tell her and tell her I couldn't help her, there's nowhere for her to go." At that point Greve decided she had to do something. She decided to find a way to create a safe haven for these kinds of children.

=== Name ===
Unlikely Heroes is named after all its volunteers, supporters, and employees. Greve considers them heroes because they're willing to take up the fight. "The name Unlikely Heroes also refers to children who have been and are about to be rescued. Almost all our rescued child victims want to share their stories to help stop the trafficking cycle. To us, these rescued kids are the heroes most of all." Founder and President Erica Greve explains the origin and vision further: "The name Unlikely Heroes is about the children we rescue – once they are fully restored – that their voices will become the voices that end human trafficking. But it is also about each and every one of us using our time, our gifts and our resources to do something to stop human trafficking worldwide."

== Services ==
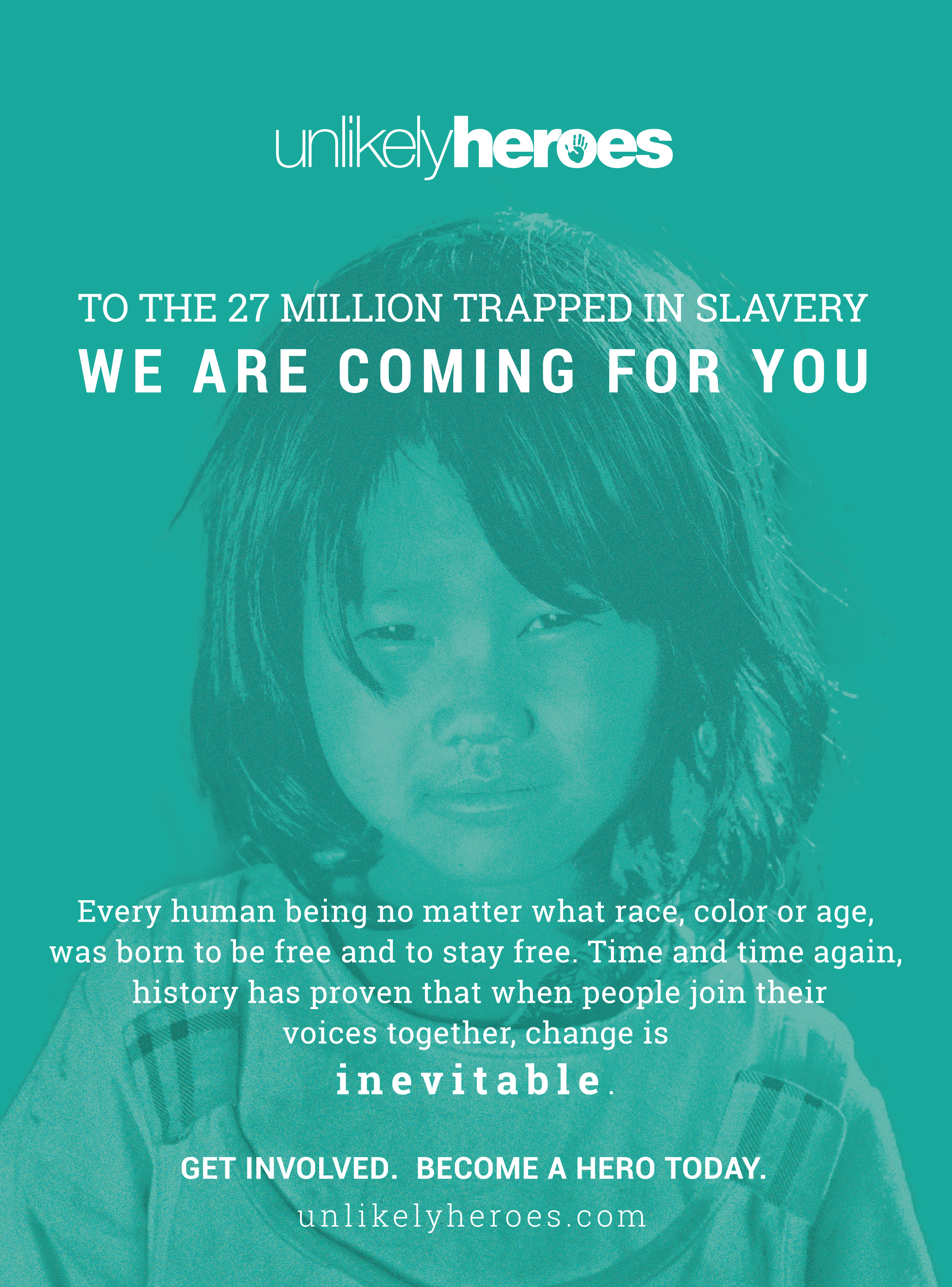
Unlikely Heroes print public service announcement.

Unlikely Heroes' mission is to rescue, restore and rehabilitate child victims of sex slavery. This is accomplished by: 1) Planning and executing the rescues of children working as sex slaves; 2) Operating "restoration homes" —therapeutic residential facilities where children can live, learn, and heal together after being rescued from sex slavery, and 3) coordinating prevention programs through community education.

=== Rescue ===
Unlikely Heroes positions rescue teams in areas where children are at high risk for sex slavery. Rescues have been conducted in the Philippines, Thailand, Mexico, & the United States. As of March 2019, over 400 children have been rescued by Unlikely Heroes.

=== Restore ===
Unlikely heroes operates group homes in the Philippines, Thailand, Mexico, and United States. These homes provide restorative care, trauma therapy, and provide educational opportunities. In addition to room, board, and education, residents of restoration homes have access to medical care, life skills and job training.

=== Educate ===
Unlikely Heroes also coordinates human trafficking awareness and prevention campaigns. As of 2018, they had educated over 80,000 people since the nonprofit was founded.

== Business model ==
Unlikely Heroes funds its operations through private donations and proceeds from fundraisers held throughout the year. According to Greve, the average cost to care for a rescued child is $5,000 per year. Each restoration home can house approximately twelve children and costs roughly $50,000 a year to run.

Unlikely Heroes was built to end human trafficking using a sustainable business model. Their growth strategy balances financial and social objectives & the message has resonated heavily with young Hollywood – a group that is ready & eager to use their social reach for good despite what you may have read in the news recently. I attended the 2013 ‘Recognizing Heroes Awards Dinner & Gala’ held at The W in Hollywood which brought together hundreds of influential supporters, musical performances, & media attention from around the globe. The young & stylish crowd enjoyed the social aspect of the event, but also demonstrated their commitment to the Unlikely Heroes cause by donating over $150,000 that night. Emerging philanthropists, especially millennials, are growing accustomed to having it all in one – sustainable & cause-centric organizations, entertaining social events, & creating real immediate impact.

— Evan Kirkpatrick, Forbes

Greve elucidated the vision: "Whether we are rescuing a girl out of a brothel, or recognizing the accomplishments of a celebrity advocate at one of our red carpet events, we do our best to protect the vulnerable and highlight the valuable." Celebrities who have attended Unlikely Hero events include Selena Gomez, Ian Somerhalder, Liana Liberato, Azie Tesfai, Francia Raisa. Jesse McCartney, Babyface, Nikki Reed, Kellan Lutz & Macy Gray.

Unlikely Heroes holds two annual fundraisers: the Recognizing Heroes Awards Dinner and Gala and the Love is Heroic Spring Benefit. The 4th annual Recognizing Heroes Awards Dinner and Gala was hosted by Nikki Reed in Dallas on November 12, 2016. The event raised over $500,000 in a single evening.
