= Harry Lipsig =

American trial lawyer (1901–1995)

- Born: December 26, 1901; Warsaw, Poland
- Died: August 11, 1995 (aged 93); Manhattan, New York, US
- Occupation: Personal injury lawyer

Harry Havon Lipsig (December 26, 1901 – August 11, 1995) was an American trial lawyer. One of the nation's most prominent personal injury attorneys, he was known for his creative arguments and emotional appeals that convinced juries to award large sums of money to his clients.

== Early life ==
Harry Havon Lipsig was born in Warsaw, Poland, on December 26, 1901, to David and Rose Lipsig. The family moved to New York when Harry was six, and his father took up work as a wholesale cigar dealer there. Harry worked as a law clerk and a bank teller during the day and attended Brooklyn Law School at night. He graduated in 1926 and subsequently went from one lawyer to the next asking them to give him their most challenging cases to try. He won nearly all of these cases, including his first—a 1926 lawsuit for property damage against the Yellow Cab Company.

== Legal career ==
Lipsig, whose specialty was the field of negligence law, became one of the nation's most prominent personal injury attorneys. Known as the "King of Torts", he garnered fame for what an obituary in The New York Times described as "his heart-wrenching courtroom depictions of the plight of accident victims and the huge jury awards his eloquence often elicited". A 1982 article reported that Lipsig had lost only four trials in the preceding twenty-five years. According to David Margolick, he "built his career on outrageousness" and was "someone who not only chased ambulances but did so flamboyantly. For thousands of accident victims, the first words out of their mouths after 'Ouch!' have been 'Harry Lipsig'." Lipsig operated on a contingency-fee model and generally received one-third of final awards; Forbes magazine estimated his 1988 income at $6 million (equivalent to $16,330,000 in 2025).

Lipsig frequently used creative strategies at trial. When a tourist visiting an Acapulco hotel was killed by a shark, he successfully sued the hotel on the theory that it had failed to warn guests that the garbage it had poured into the ocean could attract sharks. Lipsig argued that a man who had suffered a heart attack had been frightened to death by a car that had rolled onto his lawn; the jury agreed and awarded the man's family $740,000. He obtained damages on behalf of a sailor who had been bitten by a mosquito off the coast of Africa and had developed malaria, maintaining that the company had a duty to warn him of the risk. When an intoxicated New York police officer struck and killed a man with his car, Lipsig sued; attorneys for the city argued that the damages should be small since the victim was seventy-one years old and his future earnings would thus have been limited, but Lipsig, who at that point was eighty-seven, invoked his own age to argue that the victim, too, could have continued to earn money for many more years. The city agreed to settle for $1.25 million.

Some cases in which Lipsig was involved resulted in the development of major legal principles, for instance when he argued that the statute of limitations in medical malpractice cases should run from the point at which the malpractice was discovered rather than the point at which it occurred. He lost in two lower courts, but the New York Court of Appeals ultimately ruled in his favor. When an informant responsible for the apprehension of the bank robber Willie Sutton was murdered, Lipsig successfully sued the city of New York on behalf of his family, contending that the police were negligent for failing to protect him from the danger. He sued on behalf of a child who had run out from between parked vehicles into the rear wheels of a moving car; his argument that drivers rather than children are expected to be careful proved successful. Lipsig's actions provoked criticism from proponents of tort reform, such as the executive director of the American Tort Reform Association, who said: ''Harry Lipsig typifies the system where no one wins but the likes of Harry Lipsig. A few others win big with him. But society is hurt.'' Lipsig, in turn, firmly supported the awarding of large jury verdicts, saying "I never get more vicious than when I talk to people who criticize large verdicts when they have never spent a day with a cripple who is imprisoned for life in his living, but dead, body".

== Later life and death ==
Lipsig practiced law into his 90s. In the late 1980s, he angrily left his law firm, started a new one with a woman who later sued him, started a third law firm, and sued the partners from his original law firm over a dispute involving the roughly 60,000 Christmas cards that he sent out annually. Lipsig's hobbies included hosting a law-related talk show on local radio, contributing to the New York Law Journal, karate, and singing. He died on August 11, 1995, of heart disease in Manhattan.
