= Self-Inflicted =

Studio album by Leaether Strip
- Released: July 15, 1997
- Recorded: 1997
- Genre: Electro-industrial, EBM
- Label: Zoth Ommog

Leaether Strip chronology
The Rebirth of Agony (1996)	Self-Inflicted (1997)	After the Devastation (2005)

Self-Inflicted is the 8th album by Leæther Strip.

== Track listing ==
1. Hate Me!
2. Black Candle
3. Understand My Torment
4. Are we the Sinners?
5. Give It Back
6. Face the Fire
7. Coming up for Air
8. Tell Me What to Do!
9. Under My Control
10. Kill a Raver
11. Showroom Dummies (written by Kraftwerk)
12. X-Files Theme (Written by Mark Snow)
