= Getting Away with Murder: Murders from 1982 to 1995 =

Getting Away With Murder: Murders from 1982 to 1995

Compilation album by Leaether Strip
- Released: 1995
- Genres: Industrial, EBM
- Label: Zoth Ommog

Leaether Strip chronology
Double or Nothing (1995)	Getting Away With Murder: Murders from 1982 to 1995 (1995)	Best of Leæther Strip (1996)

Getting Away With Murder: Murders from 1982 to 1995, commonly referred to as GAWM, is a compilation album released in 1995 by Leaether Strip. It collects various rare and unreleased material.

== Track listing ==
1. Tears of Stone (Confinement Tour Intro)
2. No Rest for the Wicked (No Vox Version)
3. Dreaming (Two Track Demo 1982)
4. Never Trust Anyone at the Carnival (Two Track Demo 1984)
5. Satanic Citizen
6. Touchdown Breakdown
7. Crash (Flight 232)
8. Zyclon B
9. Leæther Strip Part II
10. Murder
