= Solitary Confinement (Leæther Strip album) =

Studio album by Leæther Strip
- Released: 1992
- Genre: Electro-industrial, EBM
- Label: Zoth Ommog

Leæther Strip chronology
Science for the Satanic Citizen (1992)	Solitary Confinement (1992)	Underneath the Laughter (1993)

Solitary Confinement is a 1992 album by Leæther Strip. Released by Zoth Ommog Records, it continued the heavy electro-industrial style of Science for the Satanic Citizen. As is usually the case, it incorporated a number of voice samples, for instance from the film A Boy and His Dog.

== Track listing ==
1. Mortal Thoughts
2. Strap Me Down
3. I Am Your Conscience
4. Nothing Seen-Nothing Done
5. Dance of Deception
6. Evil Speaks
7. Adrenalin Rush
8. Crash Flight 232/92
9. Croatia
10. Red Meat Attraction
11. Jantes Revenge
12. Antius [Psycho Strip Edit][*]
