= KiEw =

German electro-industrial band

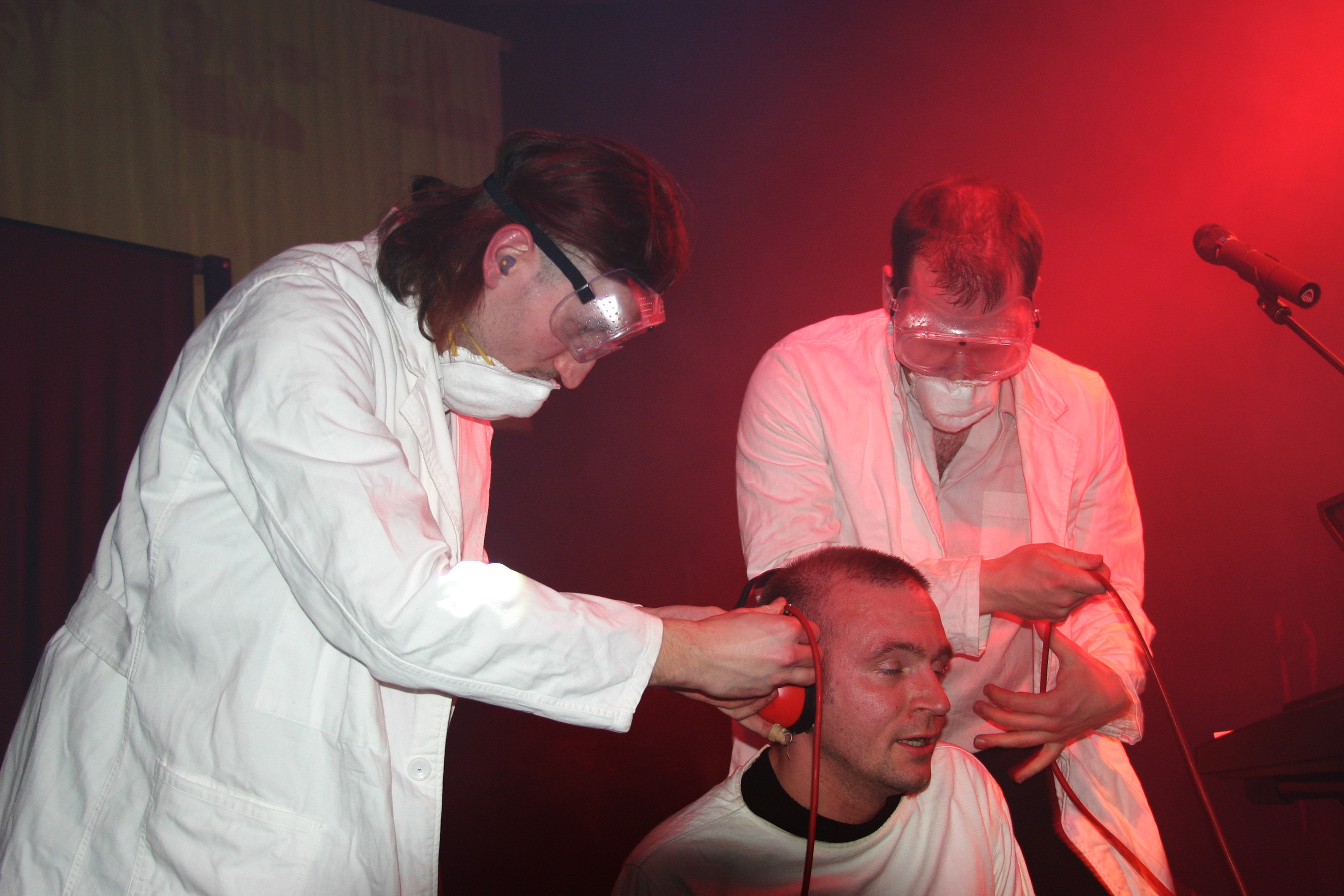
- KiEw live in Kassel, Germany

Background information
- Origin: Lüneburg, Lower Saxony, Germany
- Genres: electro-industrial, power noise, avant-garde
- Years active: 1990–present
- Label: Out of Line
- Members: Andreas "Thedi" Thedens (vocals/keyboards, 1990–present); Matthias Kulcke (guitar/drums, 1993–present); Stephan "Thiemi" Thiemicke (bass/keyboards, 1993–present)
- Past members: Birk Lübberstedt (percussion, 1990–1991); Tassilo Schmitt (vocals, 1991–1993); Thilo Eichenberg (guitar, 1990–1993); Jan Michel Luckow (keyboards, 1990–2000); Thomas "Biwi" Bierbach (vocals/percussion, 1991–2000); Martin Mälzer (vocals/drums, 2010–2017)
- Website: kiew.org

KiEw is a German electro-industrial project from Lüneburg in Lower Saxony, Germany. It was founded in late 1990 by Andreas "Thedi" Thedens in order to make music inspired by Thedis lyrics, that made him a local hero of Lüneburg underground culture.

== History ==
KiEw began with avant-garde and dada-industrial sound experiments and later changed to more rhythmic power electro-industrial/power noise upon the release of Feierabend in 2000. The band uses a lot of break beat, techno elements, and voice samples from movies and audio books, among other sources. The band has been signed to Out Of Line Music since 2000. The main themes of the music are insanity, schizophrenia, paranoia, and therapy.

The first lineup of KiEw consisted of founder Andreas "Thedi" Thedens and his school friends Thilo Eichenberg, Birk Lübberstedt and Jan Michel Luckow. After the early recording sessions beginning of 1991, Birk Lübberstedt left the band. Tassilo Schmitt joined during the first sessions and also Thomas "Biwi" Bierbach became a new band member as a singer and percussionist. In December 1993 KiEw had its live debut at Dorfgemeinschafthaus Ochtmissen near Lüneburg (Lower Saxony/Germany). Meanwhile, Tassilo Schmitt did not identify with KiEws music and aims anymore, so he left. Stephan "Thiemi" Thiemicke joined the band for playing bass, analog synth, and live performance shouting. Thilo Eichenberg (guitar) took part in the rehearsals, but left a short time before the debut show at Dorfgemeinschaftshaus Ochtmissen. Matthias Kulcke became new guitarist. Together with Stephan Thiemicke (bass), Martin Mälzer (guitar, vocals), and Thorsten Krolow (drums) he also formed the band Mohai in the early 90s.

In 2000 Thomas Bierbach and Jan Michel Luckow left, so KiEw became a trio until 2010, when Martin Mälzer (vocals, drums) officially joined KiEw. Before becoming an official member, Martin Mälzers voice appeared on some KiEw releases. He was special guest at some KiEw live shows as a singer, did remixes for KiEw and assisted the KiEw audio engineer Hauke Dressler several times since 2009. In 2017 Martin Mälzer resigned from the band after the Primal Uproar Festival at Motorschiff Stubnitz in Hamburg in July.

== Members ==
- Andreas "Thedi" Thedens
- Matthias Kulcke (since 1993)
- Stephan "Thiemi" Thiemicke (since 1993)

== Former members ==
- Birk Lübberstedt (1990–1991)
- Tassilo Schmitt (1991–1993)
- Thilo Eichenberg (1990–1993)
- Jan Michel Luckow (1990–2000)
- Thomas "Biwi" Bierbach (1991–2000)
- Martin Mälzer (2010–2017)

== Discography ==
=== Albums, EPs, Vinyl ===
- Feierabend – (CD, EP) 2000 - KickBox
- Divergent – (CD) 2001 - Out Of Line
- Diskette – (CD, EP) 2003 - Out Of Line
- Audiotherapy – (CD Album + DVD) 2004 - Out Of Line
- Festplatte – (12", Ltd. Edition White Vinyl [300 copies]) 2004 - Out Of Line
- Exit #72 – (CD, EP) 2005 - Out Of Line
- Visite – (CD, Limited to 500 copies sold at 15 years of KiEw anniversary show) 2006 - Out Of Line
- mental [per]mutation - (2 CD, Album) 2010 - Out Of Line

=== CDr Recordings ===
- Die Geburt deines Kalbes erfüllt unser Dorf mit Freude (remastered) – (2CDr, Ltd. Edition [10 copies]) 1997 - no label
- Sauberkeit – (CDr, Ltd. Edition [77 copies]) 1997 - no label
- kiew killz! – (CDr, Ltd. Edition [111 copies]) 1998 - no label
- Aas, 500m (Ilmenau Edition) – (CDr, Ltd. Edition [25 copies]) 1999 - no label
- Aas, 500m (Bielefeld Edition) – (CDr, Ltd. Edition [25 copies]) 1999 - no label
- Aas, 500m (Dresden Edition) – (CDr, Ltd. Edition [25 copies]) 1999 - no label
- Aas, 500m (Living Dead Edition) – (CDr, Ltd. Edition [75 copies]) 1999 - no label
- Aas, 500m (black Living Dead Edition) – (CDr, Ltd. Edition [2 copies]) 1999 - no label

=== Demo Tapes ===
- Operationssaal (1991)
- Kühlschrank (1992)
- Untitled (1993)
- Die Geburt deines Kalbes erfüllt unser Dorf mit Freude (1994)

=== Compilation appearances ===
- E – (CD) 1999, Track #1 "Feierabend In Kiew" - Kafue Systeme
- Electro Club Attack - Shot Three – (2xCD) 2000, Disc #1, Track #13 "Feierabend" -
- Electro Technik - The Very Limited Collection Vol. 3 – (CD) 2000, Track #11 "Gerüchte Aus Kiew (KiEw Kontact Mix)" - VLE Media
- Access [One] – (2xCD) 2001, Disc #2, Track #10 "Heisse Silke" - XXC
- Awake The Machines Vol. 3 – (CD) 2001, Track #9 "Graograman" - Out of Line
- Electro Club Attack - Shot Four (2xCD) 2001, Disc #1, Track #5 "Gerüchte" - XXC, Zoomshot Media Entertainment
- Extreme Jenseitshymnen 1 – (CD) 2001, Track #6 "Feierabend In Kiew" - UpSolution Recordings
- Gothic Compilation Part XIV – (CD Enhanced) 2001, Track #1 "Heisse Silke" - Batbeliever Releases
- Industrial for the Masses – (CD) 2001, Track #14 "Ausser Kontrolle (Kurzschluss Edit)" and Track #15 "Staub (Stoned)" - Out of Line
- Machineries of Joy – (2xCD, Ltd. Edition [3000 copies]) 2001, Disc #1, Track #16 "Zimmer 72" - Out of Line
- Wellenreiter In Schwarz Vol. 5 – (2xCD) 2001, Disc #2, Track #8 "Feierabend" - Nova Tekk
- Extreme Jenseitshymnen 2 – (CD) 2002, Track #5 "Graograman (Death Surrounds Mix)" - UpSolution Recordings
- Machineries of Joy Vol. 2 – (2xCD) 2002, Disc #2, Track #15 "Sojifu" - Out of Line
- Sliding Horse One – (CD) 2002, Track #10 "Graograman" - Sliding Horse
- Awake the Machines Vol. 4 – (CD) 2003, Track #18 "DCDisk" - Out of Line
- DSSG - Der Sampler 2 – (CD Sampler) 2003, Track #2 "Tunnel (Live at Matrix, Bochum, 2002-12-13)" - no label
- Extreme Clubhits VIII – (CD) 2003, Track #4 "Tunnel" - UpSolution Recordings
- Advanced Electronics Vol. 3 – (2xCD) 2004, Disc #2, Track #15 "DCDisk" - Synthetic Symphony
- Industrial for the Masses Vol. 2 (Limited Edition) – (2xCD) 2004, Disc #1, Track #16 "DCDisk (Marble Mix)" - Out of Line
- Intensivstation - (CD) 2004, Track #3 "DCDisk (Soman Special Edit)" - Totentanz
- Machineries of Joy Vol. 3 – (2xCD, Ltd. Edition) - (2xCD) 2004, Disc #2, Track #15 "Odessa" - Out of Line
- Zillo Club Hits 9 – (CD) 2004, Track #12 "DCDisk (DD Version)" - Zillo
- Awake the Machines Vol. 5 – (2xCD, Ltd. Edition) 2005, Disc #2, Track #14 "Synapsenbrecher (13th Monkey Remix)" - Out of Line
- Bodybeats – (CD) 2005, Track #14 "Graograman (F/A/V Remix)" - COP International
- Celebrate the Machines - An Out of Line 10th Anniversary Megamix! – (CD Sampler, Ltd. Edition) 2005, Track #10 "Feierabend In Kiew" - Out of Line
- M'era Luna Festival 2005 – (2xCD) 2005, Disc #1, Track #13 "Nachtwache" - Totentanz
- New Signs & Sounds 12/05-01/06 – (CD Sampler, Enhanced) 2005, Track #6 "Gabriel (Architect Remix)" - Zillo
- This Is... Techno Body Music Vol. 1 – (2xCD) 2005, Disc #1, Track #11 "Zimmer 72 (Rob Acid Remix)" - Masterhit Recordings
- Advanced Electronics Vol. 5 – (2xCD + DVD) 2006, DVD Track #4 "Nachtwache" - Synthetic Symphony
- Dark Flower Vol. II – (2xCD) 2006, Disc #2, Track #5 "Gabriel (Convulsive Therapy By Skinjob Mix)" - Angelstar
- Industrial for the Masses Vol. 3 – (2xCD, Ltd. Edition) 2006, Disc #1, Track #7 "Mr. 29 (Feat. Ambassador 21)" - Out of Line
- Out of Line Festival Vol. 2 – (DVD) 2006, Track #18 "Feierabend In Kiew" - Out of Line
- Public Convenience II – (12") 2006, Side A, Track #3 "Sojifu (Kinderlandmix)" - Restroom Records
- Scenes from a Galton's Walk – (CD) 2006, Track #11 "Killers (Nachtwache-RMX Re-Edit)" - Ant-Zen
- Cut&Go – (CDr) 2007, Track #10 "Mister 29 (Ambassador 21 Remix)" - Invasion Wreck Chords
- Machineries of Joy Vol. 4 – (2xCD) 2007, Disc #2, Track #15 "Delusion" - Out of Line
- Awake the Machines Vol. 6 – (2xCD, Ltd. Edition) 2008, Disc #2, Track #15 "Käferfrühstück (7 Uhr Edit)" - Out of Line
- Advanced Electronics Vol. 7 – (2xCD + DVD) 2008, Disc #2, Track #10 "Käferfrühstück (8 Uhr Edit)" - Synthetic Symphony
- Kinetik Festival Volume One – (2xCD) 2008, Disc #1, Track #6 "Graograman (Death Surrounds)" - Artoffact Records
- Brainstorm Compilation 1 – (2xCD) 2009, Disc #2, Track #11 "Harvey" - Not on Label
- Industrial for the Masses Vol. 4 – (2xCD, Ltd. Edition) 2010, Disc #1, Track #6 "Stille/Stimme (IFTM Edit)" - Out Of Line
- Extreme Störfrequenz 5 – (CD) 2010, Track #12 "Käferfrühstück" - UpScene
- Awake The Machines Vol. 7 – (3xCD) 2011, Disc #3, Track #15 "Unter Dem Grund (Underground Version)" - Out Of Line
- Musik Für Eingeweide Vol. 1 – (CD) 2012, Track #10 "Staub (Live)" - Empty Room Exploration
