= Metalocalypse season 3 =

Metalocalypse
- Season 3
- DVD cover
- No. of episodes: 10

Release
- Original network: Adult Swim
- Original release: November 8, 2009 – October 24, 2010

Season chronology
- ← Previous; Season 2 Next → Season 4

The third season of the animated show Metalocalypse originally aired on Adult Swim from November 8, 2009 to October 24, 2010 with 10 episodes. The show follows virtual death metal band Dethklok. This season featured a 22-minute runtime (30 with commercials).

Many of the songs played by Dethklok throughout this season were released as part of the album Dethalbum III in 2012. Additionally, several episodes featured musical numbers sung by members of Dethklok.

In May 2015, this season became available on Hulu Plus.

== Guests ==
This season featured guest voice actors from musicians such as Kirk Hammett of Metallica, Slash, Scott Ian of Anthrax, Joe Satriani, Steve Vai, Ace Frehley, Matt Pike of High on Fire, Dave Grohl of Foo Fighters; Brann Dailor, Brent Hinds, and Troy Sanders of Mastodon; and Grutle Kjellson, Arve Isdal, and Herbrand Larsen of Enslaved. Actress Frankie Ingrassia and comedians Laraine Newman and Andy Richter also appeared as voice actors.

== Special features ==
Disc One

- General Crozier/Falconback teaser
- Whack-a-Clown ("Dethzazz" extended scene)

Disc Two

- Dimmu Burger Drive Thru
- "Places" with FaceBones
- House Cleaning ("Renovationklok" extended scene)
- Furniture ("Renovationklok" deleted scene)
- Immortal Records ("Renovationklok" extended scene)
- Klokateer Recruitment Videos 1–4
- Escort Services ("Fertilityklok" extended scene)
- Drunk ("DethHealth" extended scene)
- Snacks ("Renovationklok" extended scene)
- Two Swedish Dads Extended Cut ("Fatherklok" extended scene)
- Murderface dance sequence
- Tribunal janitor
- Offdensen palling around

Blu-ray Exclusives

- Nathan Reading Shakespeare's "Othello"

Music videos:

- Bloodlines
- Dethsupport
- The Gears
- Burn the Earth
- Black Fire Upon Us

== Production ==
Every episode of this season was 22 minutes long, as opposed to the 11 minute episodes from season one and two. Show creator Brendon Small wanted to use this extra air time to focus on character development and giving several main characters an episode dedicated to them. This was also the first season to be released on Blu-ray.

Comedian Brian Posehn helped write an episode this season; he would later go on to become a main writer for season four.

This was the first Metalocalypse home media release to be uncensored.

== Episodes ==
| No. overall | No. in season | Title | Directed by | Written by | Original release date | Prod. code |
|---|---|---|---|---|---|---|
| 40 | 1 | "Renovationklok" | Jon Schnepp | Brendon Small | November 8, 2009 | 301 |
Dethklok faces life without Offdensen, who has died as a result of his injuries at the hands of the Metal Masked Assassin. Mordhaus is now a floating fortress and is undergoing heavy renovations to repair the damage from the Revengencers attack, but due to the band's inability to manage their finances they find themselves in a financial crisis. The band plans the most expensive concert in history to herald their return. But their plans run afoul as their record label's president falls gravely ill, and his son (voiced by Steve Vai) is put in charge, and wishes revenge for an incident at the beginning of Dethklok's career. The concert begins as planned, but the plug is literally pulled on Dethklok, and are unable to continue unless they renegotiate their contract on terms much more favorable to the label. Just as Nathan prepares to sign the new contract, Offdensen appears, apparently back from the dead, and tells Dethklok that they should continue with the show and that he will take care of the contract. After the band finishes their concert, Offdensen explains that he had himself pronounced dead at the scene (at the end of Season 2), and that there was something he had to do, and that he will tell Dethklok about it when the time is right. Guest voices: Scott Ian of Anthrax, Joe Satriani, Steve Vai Songs included: "Hatredcopter" and "Crush the Industry"
| 41 | 2 | "Tributeklok" | Jon Schnepp & Mark Brooks | Brendon Small & Mark Rivers | November 15, 2009 | 302 |
Facing public scrutiny following brash statements made by Murderface at a press conference, Dethklok decides to lift their worldwide ban on Dethklok tribute bands. While exercising their right to approve or disapprove of any tribute act, the band discovers that Toki has been posing as Skwisgaar in a tribute band called Thunderhorse. Trying to distance themselves from celebrity status and re-connect with normal people, Dethklok decides to join Thunderhorse, in the process kicking out all the original members. They learn the enormous amount of suffering regular bands go through, from starvation to sleep deprivation. They finally crack when Ofdensen asks them to return to Mordhaus, leaving Murderface to face the ire of Thunderhorse's new fans. Guest voices: Slash, Scott Ian of Anthrax, Laraine Newman, Steve Vai Songs included: "Thunderhorse", "Face Fisted" and "Starved"
| 42 | 3 | "Dethhealth" | Jon Schnepp | Brendon Small & Kristofor Brown | November 22, 2009 | 303 |
After a near-death experience, Dethklok must face the brutality of going to a doctor. They attempt to get good checkup results by cleansing their bodies by drinking bleach, thinking it will "cleanse" them. Nathan visits a dentist while the rest of Dethklok goes to the doctor, and during his visit, Murderface accidentally ejaculates on a doctor's face. Afterwards, the checkup results show that Pickles has a terminal illness. Murderface then confronts the doctor about his experience, and finds that the doctor is flirting with him, establishing that the doctor is gay and thus nullifying any possibility that Murderface is. More lab results come back and reveal that Pickles is not dying as he switched his urine sample with Murderface who switched his pee with Skwisgaar who switched his pee with Nathan who switched his pee with Toki who switched his pee with his cat, which is actually dead. After the credits, Nathan and the doctor go out hunting, but as fate would have it, the doctor shoots himself in the mouth. Guest voice: Ace Frehley Songs included: "I Ejaculate Fire"
| 43 | 4 | "Dethmas" | Mark Brooks | Brendon Small & Janine DiTullio | December 6, 2009 | 304 |
As Murderface and Knubbler prepare for their upcoming Christmas special (funded by the Christian church), Dethklok's mothers arrive for the festive season. Meanwhile, Toki goes gift shopping for his band mates only to discover that Dr. Rockso has found a job as Santa Claus in a mall. Toki takes Rockso back to Mordhaus. Murderface (tired of the band telling him that the Christmas special is going to suck) lies and says that it will be full of blood, gore and tits. Rockso finds the presents Toki bought and sells them to buy cocaine. Christmas Eve arrives and Murderface and Knubbler host the Christmas special. Nathan becomes enraged upon the lack of brutality and goes to the studio. Simultaneously, Dethklok's moms get drunk and Toki, who finds a few balloons in place of where his gifts used to be, sets off to kill Rockso. Meanwhile, a Klokateer tries to block Dr. Rockso, but fails. He, the drunk moms and Dethklok crash the Christmas special and the credits roll as Toki gets crushed by a large, wooden cross as Stella knocks it over while drinking alcohol, Rockso gets a handjob from Serveta and Murderface gets brutally beaten by the head of the Christian church in front of a studio audience and live broadcast. Guest voices: Grutle Kjellson, Arve Isdal and Herbrand Larsen of Enslaved, Laraine Newman Songs included: "The Cyborg Slayers"
| 44 | 5 | "Fatherklok" | Jon Schnepp | Story by : Brendon Small & Brian Posehn; Teleplay by : Brendon Small | December 13, 2009 | 305 |
After many paternity lawsuits, Skwisgaar decides that he should find his father. Several thousand men come forward with valid claims to be Skwisgaar's father, but DNA testing finds no match. Meanwhile, despite Nathan's warnings, Murderface attempts to make himself a father figure to Skwisgaar, hoping to seduce Skwisgaar's mother, Serveta. This in turn inadvertently aggravates Pickles's issues with his own abusive father. Skwisgaar soon receives a message from Serveta, saying she has found his father, and as a result he quits the band to move back to Sweden. However, he discovers that Serveta was referring to her new husband, Týr. After some initial friction, Skwisgaar grows closer to his stepfather, beginning a new life as a sawmill worker and finding a girlfriend in the process. Back at Mordhaus, the band seems to crumble without Skwisgaar, and Nathan leads them to Sweden, where they attempt to convince Skiwsgaar to return. However, he remains unconvinced until he returns home with Týr, where they witness Serveta cheating with two other men. Týr immediately abandons them, and Skwisgaar realizes that he can't live as a regular person, as he is meant to be a guitar god. Pickles and Toki give Murderface a cathartic beating after one slight too many, while Skwisgaar returns to Dethklok and his life of promiscuity. Guest voices: Laraine Newman, Matt Pike of High on Fire and Sleep
| 45 | 6 | "Fertilityklok" | Mark Brooks | Brendon Small | September 26, 2010 | 306 |
After playing in Tokyo, Dethklok kidnaps and threatens to kill Toki for his birthday party as a practical joke. The band gives him several women to sleep with, but Toki declines and instead begins the search for a soul mate using a dating service. After realizing looks do matter to him, instead of just "what's inside", he returns to having sex with numerous women. Meanwhile, Murderface, fed up with his sexual performance, bets Skwisgaar that he can sleep with more women than Skwisgaar can. Murderface loses the bet, faces a sexual harassment suit after harassing a female Klokateer and ends up with his penis broken and splayed by the dating service's enforcer as retaliation for Toki reneging on his match. Guest voices: Kirk Hammett of Metallica, Frankie Ingrassia, Andy Richter and Laraine Newman Songs included: "Biological Warfare"
| 46 | 7 | "Dethsiduals" | Mark Brooks | Brendon Small & Kristofor Brown | October 3, 2010 | 307 |
Toki and Murderface are put on probation after their frivolous lawsuit against the other band members regarding residuals is dismissed and their contribution to the band is called into question. In France, Toki and Murderface babble and shatter every wine bottle. On the Dethjet, Nathan decides to kick the two out of Dethklok. Later, in Mordhaus, Charles gives Toki and Murderface musical suspension forms, making them on probation. While on probation, Toki and Murderface act as celebrity guest judges on "American Super Talent Havers" to make some extra money. On the show, they judge a nu metal band known as Get Thee Hence (voiced by Mastodon's Brann Dailor, Brent Hinds, and Troy Sanders and Kiss' Ace Frehley) and like the group so much that they decide to start their own record label called MurderTooth Records and sign Get Thee Hence as their first and only band. While Toki and Murderface learn the horrors of managing the entitled and abusive band, Pickles, Nathan, and Skwisgaar are unhappy with their new 47 songs because they lack the negativity normally instilled by the two suspended bandmates. In the end, the band realizes that they liked the band the way it was and reconcile, although Toki and Murdertooth receive no publishing royalties from Get Thee Hence due to a clerical error. However, as Get Thee Hence perform as an opening act for Dethklok, the audience heckles their nu metal performance, breaking onto the stage and maiming them. Guest voices: Brann Dailor, Brent Hinds, and Troy Sanders of Mastodon, Ace Frehley Songs included: "Killstardo Abominate"
| 47 | 8 | "Rehabklok" | Mike Roush | Brendon Small | October 10, 2010 | 308 |
After an accident at a show in Mozambique that seemed to be caused by Pickles' drinking costs millions of dollars in damage, Pickles is into rehab. While in rehab, the band replaces Pickles at practice with a high tech, sentient drum machine named X2P1158 which is inexplicably armed with a 10,000 megaton self-detonation device. At the rehab center, Malevolent Creation, Pickles tries to escape, but is stopped, eventually admitting that his alcoholism began when his brother, Seth, blamed him for burning down the family garage as a child. In order to complete his rehabilitation and return to the band, Pickles eventually forgives his brother, although not before Seth extorts 5 million dollars from him. In the meantime, X2P1158 becomes self-aware through alcohol, drugs and sex with groupies, an event its creators warned against. When the band informs X2P1158, who they have come to dislike, that Pickles will be returning and taking its place, the drum machine goes haywire and kidnaps the band, intending to kill through self-detonation. Pickles, locked by X2P1158 in the band's green room, is unable to decide between saving his bandmates and consuming the green room's liquor. Pickles ultimately decides to do both, destroying X2P1158 in the process. In a scene after the credits, Dethklok relaxes in a sauna with Pickles, who has happily resumed his alcoholism. Guest voice: Kirk Hammett of Metallica Songs included: "Skyhunter" and "Killstardo Abominate"
| 48 | 9 | "Dethzazz" | Mark Brooks | Brendon Small & Janine DiTullio | October 17, 2010 | 309 |
Toki tries to reunite Dr. Rockso's band, and make his life more successful by investing into the ultimate Zazz Blammymatazz reunion. Dethklok becomes actively engaged to the success of the concert due to the fact that Toki wasted all of the band's vacation fund for their trip to Disneyland on the concert. It is revealed that this is at least the 4th attempt to reunite Zazz Blammymatazz, and the other reunion concerts were canceled for a multitude of reasons, usually revolving around Rockso's drug addictions. As part of Dethklok's attempts to promote the reunion concert, Dr. Rockso's past is revealed, his fall from grace having been caused by a love affair with a 14-year-old girl named Dory McLean in 1981. This causes Rockso to run away, and hide in a crackhouse. Toki as a result, falls into a deep emotional depression - compounded by his irrational fear of centennial - for which he is treated by Dr. Twinkletits. Rockso attempts suicide by snorting a powerful drug, but the band manages to find and revive the clown, and his return coincides with Toki coming to terms with his abusive childhood. Rockso plays the concert; everything runs smoothly until Murderface shows Toki all the money he got from scalping tickets (consisting mostly of quarters). This causes Toki to panic and accidentally set fire to the stage. Many die, but in the end Dethklok recoup their money thanks to an insurance claim, and Rockso is reunited with McLean, who is now middle-aged with a young daughter named Chastity (towards whom Rockso shows an immediate attraction). Guest voice: Laraine Newman
| 49 | 10 | "Doublebookedklok" | Jon Schnepp | Brendon Small | October 24, 2010 | 310 |
Growing annoyed with Offdensen's neglecting them in favor of work, Dethklok unwittingly double-books a gig in both Israel and Syria, putting the two countries at risk of starting a war. Offdensen gets visibly angry and yells at the band for the first time, going so far as to order them out of the room while conducting a planning session trying to fix the diplomatic mess the band has created. The Tribunal initiates its "FalconBack Project", and it is revealed that Offdensen witnessed Mr. Selatcia brainwashing General Crozier in "Dethrelease" and may know not only of the Falconback Project, but Selatcia's true identity. The band runs away from home, but Offdensen eventually finds them and they reconcile. Dethklok perform using Offdensen's plan to use 3D holograms, appearing at both concerts and averting the war, which ultimately brings about peace in the Middle East. In the final scene, Offdensen is hinted to have some connection to Selatcia, and Edgar Jomfru is shown to once again be a prisoner in Mordhaus, this time helping with Offdensen's own plans. Guest voices: Dave Grohl of the Foo Fighters, Kirk Hammett of Metallica, and Laraine Newman Songs included: "The Galaxy"

== See also ==
- List of Adult Swim home videos
