= Dethalbum III =

Studio album by Dethklok
- Released: October 16, 2012
- Recorded: 2012
- Genre: Melodic death metal
- Length: 51:12
- Label: Williams Street
- Producer: Brendon Small, Ulrich Wild

Dethklok chronology
Dethalbum II (2009)	Dethalbum III (2012)	The Doomstar Requiem (2013)

Alternative cover
- Deluxe edition artwork

Singles from Dethalbum III
- 1. "I Ejaculate Fire" Released: September 4, 2012

Dethalbum III is the third full-length album by virtual death metal band Dethklok, from the Adult Swim animated series Metalocalypse. The CD and deluxe CD/DVD were released on October 16, 2012. It contains music from the third and fourth seasons of the show. Like The Dethalbum and Dethalbum II before it, the music is performed by the show's creator Brendon Small and drummer Gene Hoglan. Additionally, the band's live bassist, Bryan Beller, performs on the album.

== Release ==
The single "I Ejaculate Fire" was released on September 4, 2012. The song "Crush the Industry" premiered on Full Metal Jackie on September 14, 2012. The song "Andromeda" premiered on Liquid Metal on September 24, 2012. The song "The Galaxy", along with its music video, premiered on Hot Topic's YouTube channel on October 3, 2012. The album was also released on vinyl on November 6, 2012.

A guitar transcription book for this album was released in April 2013 through Alfred Music Publishing.

== Reception ==
Professional ratings
Review scores
Source	Rating
About.com	4.5/5 stars
AllMusic	4/5 stars
The A.V. Club	B−
Exclaim!	7/10
Loudwire	4/5 stars
Sputnikmusic	3/5
Ultimate Guitar	7.7/10

The album peaked at number 10 on the Billboard 200 chart, selling over 20,000 copies in its first week of release. This overtook Dethalbum II as the highest charting death metal album.

== Track listing ==
All tracks are written by Brendon Small. Virtual writing credits attributed to Dethklok, except where noted, virtual lyrics written by Nathan Explosion.

No.	Title	Length
1.	"I Ejaculate Fire" (from "Dethhealth")	3:38
2.	"Crush the Industry" (from "Renovationklok")	5:29
3.	"Andromeda" (from "Writersklok")	3:27
4.	"The Galaxy" (from "Doublebookedklok")	5:15
5.	"Starved" (from "Tributeklok")	4:57
6.	"Killstardo Abominate" (from "Dethsiduals" and "Rehabklok")	2:31
7.	"Ghostqueen" (from "Motherklok")	4:18
8.	"Impeach God" (from "Dethgov")	3:34
9.	"Biological Warfare" (from "Fertilityklok")	4:35
10.	"Skyhunter" (from "Rehabklok")	4:08
11.	"The Hammer" (from "Dethcamp") (virtual writing credits: Dethklok and Magnus Hammersmith)	4:28
12.	"Rejoin" (from "Fanklok")	4:52
Total length:		51:12

Deluxe DVD
No.	Title	Length
1.	"The Making of Dethalbum III"	32:54
2.	"The Galaxy" (music video)	5:26
3.	"I Ejaculate Fire" (music video)	3:46
Total length:		42:06

== Personnel ==
=== Virtual personnel from Metalocalypse ===
- Nathan Explosion – vocals
- Pickles – drums
- Skwisgaar Skwigelf – lead guitar
- Toki Wartooth – rhythm guitar
- William Murderface – bass
- Magnus Hammersmith – rhythm guitar ("The Hammer")

==== Production ====
- Dethklok – production
- Abigail Remeltindrinc – production
- Dick "Magic Ears" Knubbler – engineering
- Charles Offdensen – legal
- All songs recorded at Dethklok Studios in Mordhaus and in the Dethsub in Andromeda's Crevice.

=== Actual personnel ===
- Brendon Small – vocals, guitars, keyboards
- Bryan Beller – bass
- Gene Hoglan – drums

==== Production ====
- Ulrich Wild – production, engineering
- Brendon Small – production
- Antonio Cannobio – cover art
- R. Chett Hoffman – direction, editing (for the documentary)
