= I Ejaculate Fire =

Single by Dethklok

Single by Dethklok

from the album Dethalbum III
- Released: September 4, 2012
- Recorded: 2012
- Genre: Melodic death metal
- Length: 3:38
- Label: Williams Street
- Songwriter(s): Brendon Small
- Producer(s): Ulrich Wild, Brendon Small

Music video
- "I Ejaculate Fire" on Vimeo

"I Ejaculate Fire" is a song by death metal band Dethklok, taken from Dethalbum III. A digital download single was released on September 4, 2012. The song first premiered in the Metalocalypse episode "Dethhealth", and was later re-recorded in studio for the album.

A music video for "I Ejaculate Fire", directed by Mark Brooks, was released on September 10, 2012.

The song was nominated for "Song of the Year" during the 2013 Golden God Awards, but did not win.

== Personnel ==
=== Virtual personnel from Metalocalypse ===
- Nathan Explosion – lead vocals
- Pickles – drums
- Skwisgaar Skwigelf – lead guitar
- Toki Wartooth – rhythm guitar
- William Murderface – bass guitar

=== Actual personnel ===
- Brendon Small – vocals, guitar, keyboards, production
- Gene Hoglan – drums
- Bryan Beller – bass guitar

==== Production ====
- Ulrich Wild – production, engineering
