= Dave Collins (sound engineer) =

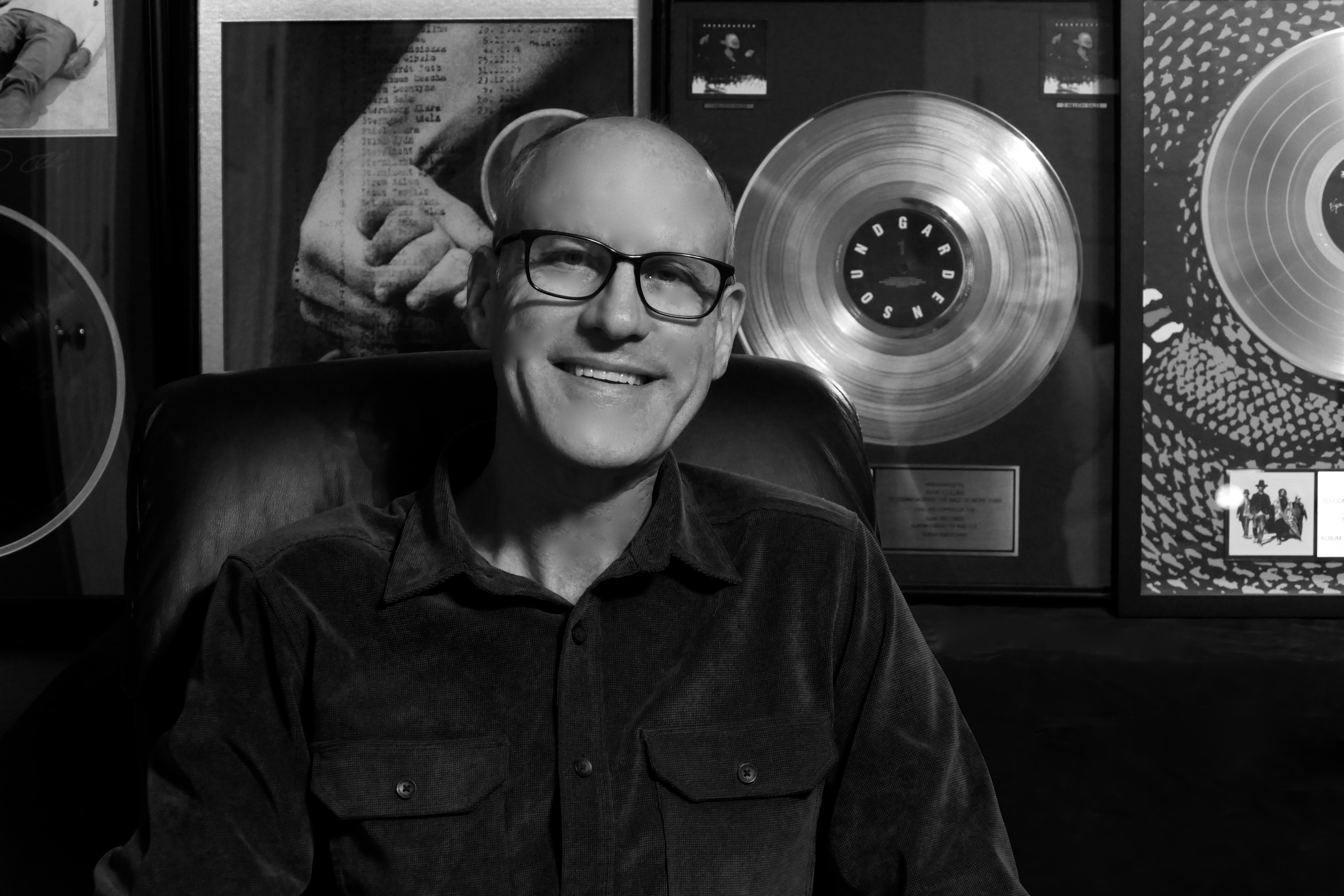

Background information
- Born: Hollywood Hills, California, U.S.
- Genres: Pop; Rock; Classical; R&B; Jazz; Gospel
- Occupations: Mastering engineer Studio Owner
- Years active: 1983-present
- Website: Official website

Dave Collins is an American Grammy Award winning mastering engineer. He has worked with numerous artists and musicians, including Alice in Chains, Metallica, Soundgarden, Weezer, Grateful Dead, Madonna, Linkin Park, The Police, Porno for Pyros, Oingo Boingo, Alice Cooper, KMFDM, Sepultura, Dethklok, Puscifier, Chris Cornell, Bon Jovi, Buckcherry, Monster Magnet, Sting, Flogging Molly, Bad Religion, Black Sabbath, Blue Öyster Cult, Chevelle, Beren Saat and Bruce Springsteen.

Collins has also mastered motion picture soundtrack albums such as Fantastic Beasts and Where to Find Them, The Hunger Games: Catching Fire, The Hunger Games: Mockingjay – Part 2, Fantastic Beasts: The Crimes of Grindelwald, Passengers, Jurassic Park, Edward Scissorhands, The Nightmare Before Christmas, Schindler's List, and Braveheart.

== Life and career ==
Dave Collins was born and raised in Hollywood Hills, California. Collins started his career in 1983 as an assistant to Armin Steiner, the American sound engineer and mixer. He worked with Steiner on the 20th Century Fox Scoring Stage until he was hired to work for Digital Magnetics, a new company created by Armin Steiner and his business partner Bruce Botnick, the American sound engineer and record producer. Collins worked as a recordist with the Sony Compact Disc Mastering System for Digital Magnetics in Hollywood from 1983 until 1988. In 1988, Collins was hired by Shelly Yakus, American recording engineer and mixer, to manage the mastering department of A&M Studios in Hollywood. In 1995, Dave Collins was promoted to oversee the four studios as Chief Mastering Engineer at A&M. Collins worked there as Chief Mastering Engineer for 14 years for until the studios were acquired by PolyGram Entertainment in 1999. After A&M’s closure, Dave Collins opened his own mastering studio on Western Avenue, Hollywood, California. In 2016, Collins moved to Pasadena after building two custom studios with Thomas Jouanjean by utilizing the principles of architectural acoustics. This location was also home to Hinge Studios owned by Craig Bauer the American mixing engineer. Collins is married to Christina Preston.

== Awards and recognition ==
During his career, Collins has worked on 9 Grammy award winning projects and over 30 Grammy award nominated projects. Recently, Collins received two Grammys at the 58th Annual Grammy Awards for his mastering of D’Angelo’s 2016 record Black Messiah which won the Best R&B Album and Record of the Year.

=== Grammy awards ===
Year	Artist	Album or Song	Category	Result
1989	Danny Elfman	Batman Movie	Best Instrumental Composition Written for a Motion Picture or for Television	Nominated
1989	Danny Elfman	The Batman Theme	Best Instrumental Composition	Won
1991	James Horner	Glory	Best Instrumental Composition Written for a Motion Picture or for Television	Won
1991	Danny Elfman	Edward Scissorhands	Best Instrumental Composition Written for a Motion Picture or for Television	Nominated
1992	John Barry	Dances with Wolves	Best Instrumental Composition Written for a Motion Picture or for Television	Won
1993	Danny Elfman	Nightmare Before Christmas	Best Musical Album for Children	Nominated
1993	Luther Vandross	How Deep is Your Love	Best R&B Male Vocal Performance	Nominated
1993	Luther Vandross	Heaven Knows	Best Rhythm & Blues Song	Nominated
1993	Luther Vandross	Little Miracles (Happen Every Day)	Best Rhythm & Blues Song	Nominated
1993	Sting	Demolition Man	Best Rock Vocal Performance	Nominated
1994	Barry White	Practice What You Preach	Best Male R&B Vocal Performance	Nominated
1994	John Williams	Jurassic Park	Best Instrumental Composition Written for a Motion Picture or for Television	Nominated
1995	John Williams	Schlinder’s List	Best Instrumental Composition Written for a Motion Picture or for Television	Won
1995	Soundgarden	Spoonman	Best Metal Performance	Won
1995	Soundgarden	Black Hole Sun	Best Rock Performance	Won
1995	Barry White	Baby’s Home	Best Male R&B Vocal Performance	Nominated
1995	Barry White	The Icon is Love	Best R&B Album	Nominated
1997	Bruce Springsteen	The Ghost of Tom Joad	The Best Contemporary Folk Album	Won
1999	Chris Cornell	Can't Change Me	Best Male Rock Vocal Performance	Nominated
2006	Buckcherry	Crazy Bitch	Best Hard Rock Performance	Nominated
2010	Barry Manilow	The Greatest Love Songs of All Time	Best Traditional Pop Vocal Album	Nominated
2012	Avett Brothers	The Carpenter	Best Americana Album	Nominated
2016	D’Angelo and The Vanguard	Black Messiah	Best R&B Album	Won
2016	D’Angelo and The Vanguard	Really Love	Best R&B Song	Won
2016	Seth Macfarlane	No One Ever Tells You	Best Traditional Pop Vocal	Nominated
2016	John Daversa	Kaleidoscope Eyes: Music of the Beatles	Best large Jazz Ensemble	Nominated
2016	John Daversa	Lucy in the Sky with Diamonds	Best Arrangement, Instrumental or a Cappella	Nominated
2016	John Daversa	Do You Want to Know a Secret?	Best Arrangement, Instrument and Vocals	Nominated
2017	Metallica	Hardwired	Best Rock Song	Nominated
2017	Metallica	Hardwired...To Self Destruct	Best Rock Album	Nominated
2018	Metallica	Atlas, Rise	Best Rock Song Nomination	Nominated
2018	Anita Wilson	Sunday Song	Best Gospel Album	Nominated
2018	Seth Macfarlane	In Full Swing	Best Traditional Pop Vocal	Nominated
2019	Alice in Chains	Rainier Fog	Best Rock Album	Nominated

== Selected discography ==
- 2024: The Linda Lindas, No Obligation — Mastering
- 2023: Dethklok, Dethalbum IV — Mastering
- 2019: Anita Wilson, Here’s to Life — Mastering
- 2018: American Aquarium, Things Change — Mastering
- 2018: Alice in Chains, Ranier Fog — Mastering
- 2018: Fantastic Beasts: The Crimes of Grindelwald-Original Motion Picture Soundtrack — Mastering
- 2018: Passengers-Original Motion Picture Soundtrack — Mastering
- 2018: Victoria & Abdul-Original Motion Picture Soundtrack — Mastering
- 2018: Bad Religion, The Kids Are Alt-Right — Mastering
- 2017: Brendon Small, Galaktikon II: Become the Storm — Mastering
- 2017: Seth MacFarlane, In Full Swing — Mastering
- 2016: Bruce Springsteen, Chapter & Verse — Mastering
- 2016: Metallica, Hardwired... to Self-Destruct — Mastering
- 2016: D’Angelo, Black Messiah — Mastering
- 2016: Chevelle, The North Corridor — Mastering
- 2015: Puscifier, Money $hot — Mastering
- 2015: Seth MacFarlane, No One Ever Tells You — Mastering
- 2015: Buckcherry, Rock 'n' Roll — Mastering
- 2014: Chevelle, La Gargola — Mastering
- 2014: Maleficent, Original Motion Picture Soundtrack — Mastering
- 2014: The Hunger Games: Mockingjay – Part 2, Original Motion Picture Soundtrack — Mastering
- 2013: The Hunger Games: Catching Fire, Original Motion Picture Soundtrack — Mastering
- 2013: Nancy Sinatra, Shifting Gears — Mastering
- 2012: Avett Brothers, The Carpenter — Mastering
- 2012: Soundgarden, The Classic Album Selection — Mastering
- 2011: Chris Cornell, Songbook — Mastering
- 2010: Weezer, Death to False Metal — Mastering
- 2010: Toadies, Feeler — Mastering
- 2010: Gin Blossoms, No Chocolate Cake — Mastering
- 2010: Alain Johannes, Spark — Mastering
- 2010: Barry Manilow, The Greatest Love Songs of All Time — Mastering
- 2008: Sepultura, Against/Nation — Mastering
- 2008: Flogging Molly, Float;— Mastering
- 2007: Linkin Park, Minutes to Midnight — Mastering
- 2008: Weezer, Red Album — Mastering
- 2006: Superman Returns, Original Motion Picture Soundtrack — Mastering
- 2006: Pink Panther, Original Motion Picture Soundtrack — Mastering
- 2005: Blink-182, Greatest Hits — Mastering
- 2002: Sting, At the Movies — Mastering
- 2000: Alice Cooper, Brutal Planet — Mastering
- 2000: Mötley Crüe, New Tattoo — Mastering
- 1999: Chris Cornell, Euphoria Morning — Mastering
- 1999: Perry Farrell, Rev — Mastering
- 1998: Black Sabbath, Reunion — Mastering
- 1997: Duran Duran, Medazzaland — Mastering
- 1997: The Police, The Very Best of Sting & The Police — Mastering
- 1997: Soundgarden, A-Sides — Mastering
- 1996: Soundgarden, Down on the Upside — Mastering
- 1996: Porno for Pyros, Good God's Urge — Mastering
- 1996: Evita, Original Motion Picture Soundtrack — Mastering
- 1994: Soundgarden-Superunknown — Mastering
- 1993: Jurassic Park, Original Motion Film Soundtrack — Mastering
- 1993: The Nightmare Before Christmas — Mastering
- 1992: Batman Returns-Original Motion Picture Soundtrack — Mastering
- 1991: Luther Vandross, Power of Love — Mastering
- 1990: Edward Scissorhands, Original Motion Picture Soundtrack — Mastering
