= Ulrich Wild =

American record producer

- Born: December 31, 1969 (age 56); Zürich, Switzerland
- Genres: Rock; heavy metal
- Occupations: Record producer, engineer
- Years active: 1993–present
- Website: ulrichwild.com

Ulrich Wild (born December 31, 1969), is an American record producer, engineer and mixer specializing in the rock and metal genres. Born and raised in Switzerland, Ulrich is now a naturalized citizen in the United States, living in Los Angeles. In a career that has spanned over 30 years, his numerous credits include producing or engineering albums for bands including Dethklok (a virtual metal band), Sex Slaves, Project 86, Pantera, Here Comes the Kraken, Static-X, Otep, Stabbing Westward, Powerman 5000, Deftones, Seether, Bleeding Through, Breaking Benjamin, Taproot, SOiL, World Entertainment War, and many other artists, and for soundtracks including Freddy vs. Jason, Mission: Impossible 2, and House of Wax. He has also remixed songs by the band Mindless Self Indulgence. He was nominated for a Grammy for best engineered non-classical album in 1995 for his work with White Zombie.

== List of produced albums ==
=== 1990s ===
- 1992: Alice in Chains - Dirt (engineered)
- 1993: Fishbone – Give a Monkey a Brain and He'll Swear He's the Center of the Universe (engineered)
- 1993: Snoop Dogg – Doggystyle (engineered)
- 1993: Gary Glitter – I'm the Leader of the Gang (I Am) (Green Jellÿ cover)
- 1993: Sting – Demolition Man (album) (mixed)
- 1994: Green Jellÿ – 333 (engineered)
- 1994: White Zombie – Airheads (song: Feed the Gods)
- 1994: Therapy? – Nativity in Black (song: Iron Man)
- 1994: White Zombie – Nativity in Black (song: Children of the Grave)
- 1995: Deftones – Adrenaline (engineered)
- 1995: White Zombie – Astro Creep: 2000 (engineered)
- 1996: White Zombie – Beavis and Butt-head Do America (song: Ratfinks, Suicide Tanks and Cannibal Girls)
- 1996: Pantera – The Great Southern Trendkill (engineered)
- 1996: Prong – Rude Awakening (engineered)
- 1997: Fu Manchu – The Action Is Go
- 1997: Handsome – Handsome (engineered)
- 1997: Deftones – Around the Fur (mixed)
- 1997: Jane's Addiction – Kettle Whistle (song: So What!)
- 1997: Incubus – S.C.I.E.N.C.E. (engineered)
- 1998: Strung Out – Crossroads & Illusions
- 1998: Grinspoon – Pushing Buttons (tracks #1 & 2)
- 1998: Grinspoon – Guide to Better Living
- 1998: Stabbing Westward – Darkest Days
- 1998: Strung Out – Twisted by Design
- 1999: Buckcherry – Buckcherry (engineered)
- 1999: Sunk Loto – Society Anxiety (mixed)
- 1999: Powerman 5000 – Tonight the Stars Revolt!
- 1999: Slipknot – Slipknot (song: Wait and Bleed)
- 1999: Static-X – Wisconsin Death Trip
- 1999: Staind – Dysfunction (mixed)

=== 2000s ===
- 2000: P.O.D. – Ready to Rumble (Song: freestyle [Remix])
- 2000: Testeagles – Non Comprehendus (mixed)
- 2000: Apartment 26 – Hallucinating
- 2000: The Union Underground – ...An Education in Rebellion
- 2000: Deftones – White Pony (additional engineering)
- 2000: Taproot – Gift
- 2001: Halfcocked – The Last Star
- 2001: Static-X – Machine
- 2001: Skrape – New Killer America
- 2002: Grinspoon – New Detention
- 2002: Breaking Benjamin – Saturate
- 2003: Stone Temple Pilots – Thank You (song: All in the Suit that you wear)
- 2003: Static-X – Shadow Zone (mixed)
- 2003: Limp Bizkit – Results May Vary (engineered)
- 2003: Bleeding Through – This Is Love, This Is Murderous
- 2004: 28 Days – Extremist Makeover
- 2005: Static-X – Start a War
- 2005: Stutterfly – And We Are Bled of Color
- 2006: SOiL – True Self
- 2006: Wicked Wisdom – Wicked Wisdom
- 2006: Mindless Self Indulgence – Shut Me Up (remix)
- 2007: Onesidezero – Onesidezero
- 2007: Project 86 – The Kane Mutiny EP
- 2007: Project 86 – Rival Factions
- 2007: Dethklok – The Dethalbum
- 2008: Showbread – Nervosa
- 2008: Mindless Self Indulgence – Never Wanted to Dance (remix)
- 2009: Dethklok – Dethalbum II
- 2009: SOiL – Picture Perfect
- 2009: Skank – Confessions Of A Failure (mixed)
- 2009: Otep – Smash the Control Machine
- 2009: Kordz – Beauty And The East
- 2009: Project 86 – Picket Fence Cartel
- 2009: Cynergy 67 – Project: Assimilation
- 2009: That Noise! – Derivatives (mixed)

=== 2010s ===
- 2010: CellOut – Superstar Prototype (mixed)
- 2010: M.A.N. – Massive Audio Nerve (mixed)
- 2010: Doyle – And Gods Will... (mixed)
- 2010: Children 18:3 – Rain's a Comin' (mixed)
- 2011: Otep – Atavist
- 2011: Tony MacAlpine – Tony MacAlpine (mixed)
- 2011: Evolution – Evolution (record, engineer and mix for the Otep Shamaya performance on the song "Change")
- 2011: Dangerous! – Teenage Rampage
- 2011 Thousand Foot Krutch – Live at the Masquerade (mixed)
- 2011: L.U.S.T. – First Tattoo (mixed)
- 2012: Brendon Small – Brendon Small's Galaktikon
- 2012: Sex Slaves – Call of the Wild
- 2012: Emilie Autumn – Fight Like A Girl
- 2012: Stolen Babies – Naught
- 2012: Dethklok – Dethalbum III
- 2013: Otep – Hydra
- 2013: Precious Child – Bloody Knees
- 2013: Dethklok - The Doomstar Requiem
- 2013: SOiL - Whole
- 2014: (hed) p.e. - Evolution (mixed)
- 2014: Romantic Rebel - Romantic Rebel
- 2017: Brendon Small – Brendon Small's Galaktikon II
- 2018: Aboleth – Benthos

=== 2020s ===
- 2020: Static-X – Project: Regeneration Vol. 1
- 2020: Psychotic Waltz - The God-Shaped Void
- 2022: Kenton Place - Terminal
- 2023: DieHumane – The Grotesque
- 2023: Dethklok – Dethalbum IV
- 2024: Static-X – Project: Regeneration Vol. 2
- 2025: Kenton Place - Road to Redemption
