= Brendon Small's Galaktikon =

Studio album by Brendon Small
- Released: April 29, 2012
- Recorded: 2009–2012(Bombshelter Studios and "The Danger Zone", Los Angeles)
- Genre: Progressive metal, space rock, progressive rock, heavy metal, power metal, hard rock
- Length: 41:15
- Language: English
- Label: BS Records (self-released)
- Producer: Brendon Small, Ulrich Wild

Brendon Small chronology
Home Movies: Bonus CD (2006)	Brendon Small's Galaktikon (2012)	Brendon Small's Galaktikon II (2017)

Brendon Small's Galaktikon is the first solo album debut by Brendon Small, known for his work on the animated television shows Metalocalypse and Home Movies, and as creator of virtual death metal band, Dethklok. The album features Dethklok members Gene Hoglan and Bryan Beller, on drums and bass, respectively. Small described the album as a "high-stakes, intergalactic, extreme rock album" and describes it as being similar to Dethklok but with more rock elements and melodic vocals. Like on previous Dethklok albums, Ulrich Wild produced the album and Antonio Canobbio designed the cover art. The album's release coincided with the premiere of the fourth season of Metalocalypse. The album was also released on vinyl in late June 2012.

== Production ==
The writing process started when Brendon Small had the studio lined up and Gene Hoglan and Bryan Beller ready to begin work on the second Dethklok album, but the legal negotiations were at a standstill. So in the meantime he decided to write a solo album since he and the band were ready but had nothing to record.

"There was a time when I didn't know if I was going to do the second Dethklok album, I had the studio lined up, and the players lined up, and the engineer and co-producer, and all that shit, and unfortunately, the guy we were negotiating with went on vacation and left things kind of dead. So I said, 'OK, fuck this – I'm going to spend my own money and get these guys doing something." —Brendon Small

The song "Dangertits" is an instrumental which Small says is a tribute to shredder guitarists like Steve Vai, Yngwie Malmsteen and Steve Morse.

=== Concept ===
Small stated that the album was written to act as an "audio comic book," in chronological order. The album follows a super hero who has just gone through a "very messy, public, intergalactic divorce," but his ex-wife gets kidnapped, so he attempts to rescue her only to find out that she is dating the antagonist.

This album should be thought of as an audio comic book, an over acted chamber drama, a ridiculous premise that takes itself way too seriously all the way to the end. —Brendon Small

=== Story ===
The album is about a superhero called Triton. At the start of the story, he receives his divorce papers from his ex-wife and takes an angry drive through space to try and cool off ("Triton"). Triton then goes to a therapist, a Lazer Witch, to see what his next step in life should be. As it so happens, the Lazer Witch is also a soothsayer. During their sessions, the Lazer Witch foresees danger and warns Triton not to attempt to save his ex-wife if she gets in trouble ("Prophecy of the Lazer Witch").

Meanwhile, Triton's arch enemy, Beastblade, escapes from prison and swears revenge on Triton ("Beastblade"). Beastblade seduces Triton's ex-wife and has sex with her ("Deathwaltz"). Triton finds out about their get-together and knows that she is in danger and contemplates whether or not to save her ("Truth Orb and the Kill Pool").

He ultimately decides to save her, but gets kidnapped by Space Pirates as he tries to reach her. Triton is taken to a planet where a corrupt government runs gladiatorial games. There, he and the other slaves are forced to fight a giant worm. Meanwhile, his ex-wife realizes that she is in danger as Beastblade reveals that he plans to kill her and then Triton ("You Can't Run Away").

Triton unites his fellow slaves in the arena and defeats the giant worm. They then turn against their masters and the crowd ("Arena War of the Immortal Masters"). A large space battle ensues as Triton destroys the Space Pirates and the government that ran the arena games.

Afterward, Triton rushes to save his ex-wife ("Dangertits"). Triton has his final confrontation with Beastblade and kills him. Saving his ex-wife one last time, Triton and his ex-wife part ways ("On My Way").

== Release and background ==
Upon release the album was available for purchase exclusively on Brendon Small's website, and later as a digital download on iTunes and Amazon. The album sold poorly in the first week of sales, selling only about 1,206 copies.

There was no tour to support the album and was only played live once (in its entirety) at "WesFest" 8 on March 3, 2013 in West Hollywood, California.

=== Adaption ===
The story of the album was adapted into a six-part comic book series published by Eric Powell's imprint Albatross Funnybooks. Issue #1 was released on August 2, 2017. The comics were written by Brendon Small and Eric Powell, with art by Steve Mannion, Jason Moore, and Marissa Louise.

== Sequel ==
On May 16, 2016, Brendon Small teased the follow-up to Galaktikon on his Twitter which was followed by an announcement later on that day. The album was released on August 25, 2017.

== Reception ==
Professional ratings
Review scores
Source	Rating
AbsolutePunk.net	63%
Metal Storm	6.5/10 stars
Sputnikmusic	3.5/5 stars
Ultimate-Guitar.com	7.7/10 stars

Under The Gun Review gave the album an 8 out of 10. In the review they stated that "You’ll find no shortage of triumphant guitar licks and grand stories on this album."

== Track listing ==
All tracks are written by Brendon Small.

No.	Title	Length
1.	"Triton"	4:02
2.	"Prophecy of the Lazer Witch"	4:34
3.	"Beastblade"	4:47
4.	"Deathwaltz"	3:33
5.	"Truth Orb and the Kill Pool"	4:28
6.	"You Can't Run Away"	5:05
7.	"Arena War of the Immortal Masters"	4:47
8.	"Dangertits" (Instrumental)	4:33
9.	"On My Way"	5:28
Total length:		41:15

== Personnel ==
- Brendon Small – vocals, guitar, keyboards, producer
- Bryan Beller – bass
- Gene Hoglan – drums

=== Production ===
- Ulrich Wild – production, engineering, mixing
- All drums recorded at "BOMB SHELTER" Studios, all other instruments and vocals recorded at Brendon Smalls "THE DANGER ZONE"
- Antonio Canobbio – album cover art
- Michael Mesker – design & art adaptation
