= Dethalbum IV =

Fourth studio album by Dethklok

Studio album by Dethklok
- Released: August 22, 2023
- Genre: Melodic death metal
- Length: 42:44
- Label: WaterTower
- Producer: Brendon Small, Ulrich Wild

Dethklok chronology
The Doomstar Requiem (2013)	Dethalbum IV (2023)	Army of the Doomstar (2023)

Singles from Dethalbum IV
- 1. "Aortic Desecration" Released: June 21, 2023

Professional ratings
Review scores
Source	Rating
Blabbermouth.net	8/10
Ghost Cult	9/10
Lambgoat	7/10
Revolver	Positive

Dethalbum IV is the fifth full-length album by virtual death metal band Dethklok, from the Adult Swim animated series Metalocalypse. The album was released on August 22, 2023, along with the film Metalocalypse: Army of the Doomstar on blu-ray and digital, with its soundtrack album released on August 25, three days after Dethalbum IV.

== Track listing ==
All tracks are written by Brendon Small. Virtual writing credits attributed to Dethklok, except where noted, virtual lyrics written by Nathan Explosion.

No.	Title	Length
1.	"Gardener of Vengeance"	3:01
2.	"Aortic Desecration"	4:11
3.	"Poisoned by Food"	3:01
4.	"Mutilation on a Saturday Night"	3:06
5.	"Bloodbath"	3:54
6.	"I Am the Beast"	4:15
7.	"Horse of Fire"	3:59
8.	"DEADFACE"	4:23
9.	"Satellite Bleeding"	3:32
10.	"SOS"	4:38
11.	"Murmaider III"	4:44
Total length:		42:44

== Personnel ==
=== Virtual personnel from Metalocalypse ===
- Nathan Explosion – vocals
- Pickles – drums
- Skwisgaar Skwigelf – lead guitar
- Toki Wartooth – rhythm guitar
- William Murderface – bass

==== Production ====
- Dethklok – production
- Dick "Magic Ears" Knubbler – production, engineering
- Charles Offdensen – legal

=== Actual personnel ===
- Brendon Small – vocals, bass, guitars, keyboards
- Gene Hoglan – drums

==== Production ====
- Ulrich Wild – production, mixing, engineering
- Brendon Small – production
- Dave Collins – mastering
- Arthur Tang – cover art
