= The Doomstar Requiem =

- A Klok Opera Soundtrack

Soundtrack album by Dethklok / Metalocalypse
- Released: October 27, 2013
- Genre: Melodic death metal, symphonic metal, rock opera
- Length: 74:52
- Label: BS
- Producer: Brendon Small, Ulrich Wild

Dethklok chronology
Dethalbum III (2012)	The Doomstar Requiem (2013)	Dethalbum IV (2023)

Singles from The Doomstar Requiem
- 1. "Blazing Star" Released: October 17, 2013

The Doomstar Requiem – A Klok Opera Soundtrack is the fourth full-length album by death metal band Dethklok, from the Adult Swim animated series Metalocalypse. It was released digitally on October 27, 2013. It was released on LP and CD in mid March 2014. It is the soundtrack album to the Metalocalypse special of the same name.

== Production ==
The album features a 50 piece orchestra under the direction of Bear McCreary. There is also a "making of" feature included with the album. For the first time, Dethklok's live guitarist Mike Keneally was featured on a studio album.

== Release ==
The first single off the album, "Blazing Star", was released on Loudwire on October 17, 2013. "Blazing Star" is the only official Dethklok song on the album, whereas the rest of the tracks are considered Metalocalypse songs.

The album was initially released as a digital download, with a physical CD and limited edition LP version released in mid March 2014. The digital download version of the album was released two days earlier than the standard release date and the CD version was released three months earlier than the standard release date exclusively on Brendon Small's website. The digital version of the album comes with a downloadable 34-page libretto of the special.

There was no tour to support the album upon release, but select songs from the album were performed live by Brendon Small and the students of the Paul Green Rock Academy in 2014 and 2015.

== Reception ==
Professional ratings
Review scores
Source	Rating
Allmusic	3.5/5 stars

Times Leader gave the album (as well as the special itself) a favorable review, stating, "This 'rock opera' should essentially be approached with a keen sense of humor, although the tunes are most enjoyable as a serious, full-blown metal/Broadway juggernaut".

== Track listing ==
All tracks are written by Brendon Small.

No.	Title	Length
1.	"The Birth / Fata Sidus Oritur / One of Us Must Die"	3:21
2.	"Magnus and the Assassin"	2:22
3.	"Partying Around the World"	2:27
4.	"Tracking / Ishnifus and the Challenge"	3:39
5.	"How Can I Be a Hero?"	2:29
6.	"The Fans Are Chatting"	2:24
7.	"Abigail's Lullaby"	1:42
8.	"Some Time Ago..."	3:41
9.	"The Duel"	2:35
10.	"I Believe"	2:26
11.	"A Traitor Amongst Them"	0:40
12.	"Training / Do It All for My Brother"	3:34
13.	"Before You Go"	1:26
14.	"The Answer Is in Your Past"	1:17
15.	"The Depths of Humanity"	2:42
16.	"Givin' Back to You"	2:45
17.	"En Antris et Stella Fatum Cruenti"	2:47
18.	"The Crossroads"	0:50
19.	"Morte Lumina"	4:08
20.	"Blazing Star" (Virtual writing credits: Dethklok)	4:30
21.	"Doomstar Orchestra"	23:23
Total length:		74:52

Bonus DVD
No.	Title	Length
1.	"The Making of Metalocalypse: The Doomstar Requiem"	6:58

== Personnel ==
=== Virtual personnel from Metalocalypse ===
==== Dethklok ====
- Nathan Explosion – vocals, piano
- Pickles the Drummer – drums, vocals
- Skwisgaar Skwigelf – lead guitar, vocals
- Toki Wartooth – rhythm guitar, vocals
- William Murderface – bass guitar, vocals

==== Additional personnel ====
- Charles Offdensen – vocals
- Metal Masked Assassin – vocals
- Magnus Hammersmith – vocals
- Ishnifus Meaddle – vocals
- Abigail Remeltindrinc – vocals

==== Production ====
- Dethklok – production
- Dick "Magic Ears" Knubbler – production, engineering
- Charles Offdensen – legal

=== Actual personnel ===
==== Dethklok ====
- Brendon Small – vocals, guitars, bass, keyboards, production
- Gene Hoglan – drums
- Mike Keneally – vocals
- Bryan Beller – bass on "Blazing Star"

==== Additional personnel ====
- Bear McCreary – orchestra
- Thundercat – bass on "How Can I Be a Hero"
- George "Corpsegrinder" Fisher – vocals
- Raya Yarbrough – vocals
- Jack Black – vocals
- Mark Hamill – vocals
- Victor Brandt – vocals
- Malcolm McDowell – vocals

==== Production ====
- Ulrich Wild – production, mixing, engineering, vocals
- Mastered by Dave Collins
- Antonio Cannobio – cover art
- Michael Mesker – package design
