= The Dethalbum =

Studio album by Dethklok
- Released: September 25, 2007
- Recorded: 2006–2007
- Genre: Melodic death metal
- Length: 52:23
- Label: Williams Street
- Producer: Ulrich Wild, Brendon Small

Dethklok chronology
The Dethalbum (2007)	Adult Swim Presents: ...And You Will Know Us by the Trail of Dead on Tour with Dethklok (2007)

Alternative cover
- The deluxe edition cover of The Dethalbum.

Singles from The Dethalbum
- 1. "Bloodrocuted" Released: September 25, 2007

The Dethalbum is the debut album by virtual Death metal band Dethklok, from American animated sitcom Metalocalypse. It was released on September 25, 2007. The album features full length songs from the TV series, as well as previously unreleased tracks. Antonio Canobbio contributed the artwork for the record.

The deluxe edition of the album includes an additional disc that features seven bonus tracks, the video for "Bloodrocuted" and the first Metalocalypse episode of the second season. A vinyl LP was released with a bonus track in July 2008.

A tour band, using session metal musicians and headed by Brendon Small, was created to promote the album. Small also provided music videos that are remade specifically for concert performances, which were later released on a DVD included with the special edition of Dethalbum II.

== Release and reception ==
Professional ratings
Review scores
Source	Rating
AbsolutePunk.net	84%
Allmusic	4/5 stars
Cosmos Gaming	favorable
Crypt Magazine	favorable

The Dethalbum was released on September 25, 2007. The album was released both as a single CD and a two-disc deluxe edition. The deluxe edition of the album includes an additional disc that features seven bonus tracks, the video for "Bloodrocuted" and the first Metalocalypse episode of the second season. In July 2008, Williams Street began selling a limited edition vinyl version of The Dethalbum on their online store. This version contains every song from the standard album, along with the "Gulf of Danzig" remix of "Go into the Water."

The album debuted at number 21 on the Billboard 200 chart, with 33,740 copies sold in its first week. The Dethalbum was also streamed 45,000 times when it went live on AOL Music during the week of its release. The album was the highest charting death metal album in the history of the Billboard 200, before Dethalbum II overtook it.

A guitar transcription book of this album was released under Alfred Music Publishing, which included a DVD of Skwisgaar teaching the solo to "Duncan Hills Coffee Jingle" and Brendon Small teaching the "Deththeme". Nine tracks from this album are included in the Dethklok bass tab anthology.

On May 8, 2026, the band released a remixed and remastered version of the album, dubbed "The Dethalbum DKXX: Dethmastered (Remixed & Remastered)."

== Other appearances ==
"Hatredcopter" was released prior to the album's release on the European edition of the Saw III Soundtrack. An earlier, shorter version of the song "Thunderhorse" is featured on Guitar Hero II. The song "Murmaider" was used in the soundtrack for the video game Brütal Legend.

== Track listing ==
All tracks are written by Brendon Small, except where noted. Virtual writing credits attributed to Dethklok, except where noted.

No.	Title	Lyrics	Length
1.	"Murmaider" (from "Dethwater")		3:24
2.	"Go into the Water" (from "The Metalocalypse Has Begun")		4:20
3.	"Awaken" (from "Dethtroll")		3:37
4.	"Bloodrocuted" (mentioned in "Dethfam")		2:18
5.	"Go Forth and Die" (from "Go Forth and Die")		4:22
6.	"Fansong" (from "Mordland")		2:53
7.	"Better Metal Snake"		3:27
8.	"The Lost Vikings"		4:26
9.	"Thunderhorse" (from "Dethwater")		2:46
10.	"Briefcase Full of Guts" (from "Murdering Outside the Box")		2:44
11.	"Birthday Dethday" (from "Birthdayface")	Small, Tommy Blacha	2:48
12.	"Hatredcopter" (Does not appear in Seasons 1 or 2, later appears in "RenovationKlok")		2:56
13.	"Castratikron" (from "Girlfriendklok")		2:57
14.	"Face Fisted" (Does not appear in Seasons 1 or 2, later appears in "TributeKlok")		4:17
15.	"Dethharmonic" (from "Fatklok")		4:31
16.	"Deththeme" (from every episode; hidden track)	Small, Blacha	0:34
Total length:			51:40

Limited edition vinyl bonus track
No.	Title	Length
17.	"Go into the Water" (Gulf of Danzig Remix)	4:20

Deluxe Edition bonus disc
No.	Title	Lyrics	Length
1.	"Duncan Hills Coffee Jingle" (from "The Curse of Dethklok")	Small, Blacha	1:15
2.	"Blood Ocean" (from "Dethstars")		2:50
3.	"Murdertrain a Comin'" (from "Bluesklok")		3:33
4.	"Pickles Intro"		0:34
5.	"Kill You" (Snakes n' Barrels cover; virtual writing credits: Pickles, Snizzy Snazz Bullets, Tony Thunderbottom, Sammy Twinskins)		3:39
6.	"Hatredy" (from "Dethkomedy")		4:17
7.	"Dethklok Gets in Tune"		3:27

- The iTunes deluxe version includes all songs from The Dethalbum and the "Bloodrocuted" video, but only three of the seven bonus tracks: "Blood Ocean", "Murdertrain a Comin'", and "Hatredy".

== Personnel ==
=== Virtual personnel from Metalocalypse ===
==== Dethklok ====
- Nathan Explosion – lead vocals, lyricist
- Skwisgaar Skwigelf – lead guitar, backing vocals
- Toki Wartooth – rhythm guitar, backing vocals
- Pickles – drums, vocals on "Hatredcopter" and "Kill You"
- William Murderface – bass

==== Production ====
- Dick "Magic Ears" Knubbler – production, engineering, mixing
- Charles Foster Offdensen – Legal council, management, CFO

=== Actual personnel ===
- Brendon Small – vocals, all other instruments, production
- Gene Hoglan – drums
- Emilie Autumn – violins on "Dethharmonic"
- Tommy Blacha – voice-over

==== Production ====
- Ulrich Wild – production, engineering (at Bombshelter Studios in Los Angeles), mixing (at Noize in the Attic)
- Raider – assistant mixing
- Ryan Page – line production
- Mike Gerlach – assistant engineering
- Tom Baker – mastering (at Precision Mastering in Los Angeles)
- Antonio Canobbio – album artwork
