= Is This Room Getting Smaller =

Studio album by Onesidezero
- Released: November 20, 2001
- Recorded: 4th Street Studios
- Genre: Nu metal; hard rock
- Length: 50:47
- Label: Maverick
- Producer: Jim Wirt

Onesidezero chronology
| Is This Room Getting Smaller (2001) | Onesidezero (2007) |

Singles from Is This Room Getting Smaller
- 1. "New World Order" Released: 2001; 2. "Instead Laugh" Released: 2001; 3. "Shed the Skin" Released: 2001

Is This Room Getting Smaller is the debut studio album by the California rock music group Onesidezero. The album was released on November 20, 2001 via Maverick Records.

== Reception and legacy ==
Professional ratings
Review scores
| Source | Rating |
|---|---|
| Allmusic | 3/5 stars |

VH1 listed Is This Room Getting Smaller as one of 12 "underrated nu metal albums". In 2006, Swedish singer Lisa Miskovsky recorded a cover of the song "Instead Laugh".

== Track listing ==
All tracks are written by Onesidezero, except "Never Ending" written by Jim Wirt and Onesidezero.

| No. | Title | Length |
|---|---|---|
| 1. | "Instead Laugh" | 3:55 |
| 2. | "Holding Cell" | 3:37 |
| 3. | "New World Order" | 3:31 |
| 4. | "A Point in Time" | 3:58 |
| 5. | "Tapwater" | 4:04 |
| 6. | "Shed the Skin" | 4:12 |
| 7. | "Awake" | 3:38 |
| 8. | "The Day We Lied" | 3:34 |
| 9. | "Soak" | 2:54 |
| 10. | "Eight" | 4:41 |
| 11. | "Never Ending" | 5:06 |
| 12. | "Underground" | 7:21 |

== Personnel ==
- Jasan Radford — vocals, guitar
- Levon Sultanian — lead guitar, backing vocals
- Brett Kane — rhythm guitar, backing vocals
- Cristian Hernandez — bass, backing vocals
- Rob Basile — drums
