= Onesidezero (album) =

Studio album by Onesidezero
- Released: June 5, 2007
- Recorded: 2006
- Studio: Los Angeles
- Genres: Alternative metal; rock
- Length: 48:43
- Label: Corporate Punishment
- Producers: Ulrich Wild, Roy Mayorga, Onesidezero

Onesidezero chronology
Is This Room Getting Smaller (2001)	Onesidezero (2007)

Singles from Onesidezero
- 1. "My Confession" Released: 2007; 2. "Sleep" Released: 2007

Onesidezero is the second studio album by Onesidezero. The album was released on June 5, 2007, almost six years after their major label debut Is This Room Getting Smaller. The album was promoted through a minor tour across the western United States alongside Re:Ignition and Adema.

A remastered version of the album was released in 2019 with a recoloured cover.

== Track listing ==
No.	Title	Length
1.	"Carry Your Gun"	4:32
2.	"Breath (A Kiss Goodnight)"	3:10
3.	"Whatever Happened To..."	3:06
4.	"Levitation"	3:43
5.	"My Confession"	3:53
6.	"Sleep"	4:10
7.	"Stay"	3:48
8.	"Blondevil"	3:06
9.	"Who Will Stop the Rain"	4:41
10.	"Safely Forgotten"	4:26
11.	"Cardboard Cutouts"	3:19
12.	"Carry Us Away"	3:40
13.	"Trickassho"	3:10

== Personnel ==
Onesidezero

- Jasan Radford — vocals
- Levon Sultanian — guitars, backing vocals
- Cristian Hernandez — bass, backing vocals
- Rob Basile — drums
