= Brendon Small's Galaktikon II: Become the Storm =

Studio album by Brendon Small
- Released: August 25, 2017
- Recorded: 2016
- Genre: Melodic death metal
- Length: 51:02
- Language: English
- Label: Megaforce, BS Records
- Producer: Brendon Small, Ulrich Wild

Brendon Small chronology
Brendon Small's Galaktikon (2012)	Brendon Small's Galaktikon II: Become the Storm (2017)

Brendon Small's Galaktikon II: Become the Storm is the second solo album by Brendon Small, known for his work on the animated television shows Metalocalypse and Home Movies, and as creator of virtual death metal band Dethklok. The album was released on August 25, 2017, through Megaforce Records. The album features Dethklok members Gene Hoglan and Bryan Beller, on drums and bass, respectively. Since Brendon Small no longer holds the rights to the Dethklok name, Gene Hoglan has suggested that this album would serve as a "new Dethklok album".

== Production ==
In May 2016 it was revealed that the follow-up to Brendon Small's 2012 solo album was in production. As of December 2016, the album had been recorded and was being mixed.

=== Concept ===
When describing his influences for the album, Small stated he wanted to draw upon themes by prominent science fiction authors.

This is more of a Frank Herbert intergalactic war story with a splash of Flash Gordon high-stakes drama... A planet divided, coming together to defeat something bigger. Can music bring an embattled planet together? Or are people really attracted to the calm lure of evil?

Small also added:

But in retrospect this could also fit the Lovecraft world. There is dread, there is manipulation of senses etc…

== Release and background ==
The album was released on August 25, 2017, through Megaforce Records.

The musicians on this album are the same as the members of Dethklok. Brendon Small had stated that Adult Swim has restricted his ability to use the Dethklok name in his music endeavors. Gene Hoglan said in an interview that, "It’s a Dethklok album, it just can’t be called Dethklok 'cause of rights. I will say this if you love Dethklok, you will love this record. The lyrics, the music and everything is Dethklok styled".

== Track listing ==
All tracks are written by Brendon Small.

CD and digital release
No.	Title	Length
1.	"Some Days Are for Dying"	4:14
2.	"Icarus Six Sixty Six"	3:34
3.	"The Agenda"	3:40
4.	"The Ocean Galaktik"	7:42
5.	"My Name Is Murder"	3:18
6.	"Become the Storm"	4:51
7.	"Nightmare"	4:06
8.	"Could This Be the End"	5:30
9.	"To Kill a God"	4:18
10.	"Exitus"	4:14
11.	"Rebuilding a Planet"	5:35
Total length:		51:02

Vinyl release

The vinyl version features the same tracks in a different order. Brendon Small said:

If you want to listen to it just as a group of songs, listen to the CD order; if you want to decipher the story listen to the Vinyl song order.

Side 1
No.	Title	Length
1.	"Some Days Are for Dying"
2.	"Nightmare"
3.	"The Ocean Galaktik"

Side 2
No.	Title	Length
4.	"The Agenda"
5.	"My Name is Murder"
6.	"Exitus"
7.	"Icarus Six Sixty Six"

Side 3
No.	Title	Length
8.	"Become the Storm"
9.	"To Kill a God"
10.	"Could This Be the End"
11.	"Rebuilding a Planet"

== Personnel ==
- Brendon Small – vocals, guitar, keyboards, producer
- Bryan Beller – bass
- Gene Hoglan – drums

=== Production ===
- Ulrich Wild – production, engineering, mixing
- Dave Collins – mastering
- Antonio Canobbio – album cover art
- Michael Mesker – package design
- Jeff Small – Triton helmet
- Eric Powell – additional artwork
- Steve Mannion – additional artwork
- Steve Agee – helmet photography
