= Onesidezero =

American rock band

- Origin: Los Angeles, California, U.S.
- Genres: Nu metal; alternative rock; hard rock
- Years active: 1997–2003, 2004–present
- Labels: Corporate Punishment; Maverick Records
- Members: Jasan Radford; Levon Sultanian; Cristian Hernandez; Rob Basile; Brett Kane
- Past members: Colin Crow; Travis Prentice; Peter Pres; Michael Tarabotto; Marello Dias

Onesidezero (also depicted as OneSideZero) is an American rock band. Their style is often described as heavy melodic rock.

== History ==
Formed in 1997, the band recorded several demos before being signed by Maverick Records. Their first full-length album, Is This Room Getting Smaller, was released on November 20, 2001. The band toured for three years, alongside bands like Incubus, 311, Sevendust, Static-X, Soulfly, and SOiL. They also appeared on HBO's Reverb with Linkin Park. The singles "Instead Laugh" and "New World Order" failed to push the album, and the band asked to be released from their contract. In 2003, Onesidezero disbanded and retreated to various side projects.

The most notable side project, Abloom (previously called Mothra), featured vocalist Jasan Radford and lead guitarist Levon Sultanian. Also part of the band was Mike Doling (ex-Snot, ex-Soulfly), Roy Mayorga (ex-Soulfly) and John Fahnestock (ex-Snot). Fahnestock left and was replaced by Marcelo Dias aka Marcello D. Rapp (ex-Soulfly). Shavo Odadjian of System of a Down took the role of executive producer.

Abloom song titles included "Cover Up", "After That Quiet", "January 2nd", "What You Came For", "Shadows", and "Mama Don't Cry". Some of these are featured on their MySpace page while others appear elsewhere on the internet. Abloom has a more classic rock feel while at times showcasing Levon Sultanian's guitar playing who is of Armenian descent.

In late 2004, Onesidezero reunited and worked on new material. The band toured throughout 2005 and 2006 while writing and recording their album with Ulrich Wild (Taproot, Static-X) at the helm. Before writing what would become their self-titled 2007 release, the band wrote, and scrapped, almost an album and a half worth of material that comprised most of their setlist from 2002 through 2006. Song titles included "Empty", "Summertime", "Quicksand", "Chasing the Sun", "Say", "Separate", "Up From Down", "U4IA", "Oneside of the Zero", and more. On November 8, 2006, Onesidezero announced they had signed with Corporate Punishment Records. Their self-titled album Onesidezero was released on June 5, 2007. It was originally slated for a February 20 release.

According to their Facebook page, the band were in the process of writing new music for their next album for a 2012 release, however this did not appear to come to fruition.

== Music ==
Writing about the band's music for LA Weekly, Paul Rogers wrote, "Onesidezero sounded like Tool without the polyrhythmic prog-iness and deliberate mystique, and offered all the angst of nu-metal sans the knuckle-dragging mob mentality. This was thoughtful, intelligent hard rock".

== Band members ==
Current

- Jasan Radford — vocals, guitar (1997–2003, 2004–2009, 2010–present)
- Levon Sultanian — Lead guitar, backing vocals (1997–2003, 2004–2009, 2010–present)
- Brett Kane — guitar, backing vocals (1998–2003, 2004-2007, 2009-2018, 2019-present)
- Cristian Hernandez — bass, backing vocals (1999–2003, 2004–2009, 2010–2018, 2019-present)
- Rob Basile — drums (1999–2003, 2004–2009, 2010–2018, 2019-present)

Former members

- Travis Prentice — drums, backing vocals (1997–1999)
- Peter Pres — bass guitar, backing vocals (1997–1999)
- Colin Crow — guitar (2007–2009)
- Michael Tarabotto - drums (2018-2019)
- Marello Dias - bass guitar (2018-2019)

== Discography ==
=== Studio albums ===
- Is This Room Getting Smaller (2001)
- Onesidezero (2007)

=== Demos ===
- 1998 –
1. Paste
2. Brocwurst
3. Sleep Through This
4. Into A Million Pieces
- 2000 –
1. Instead Laugh
2. Holding Cell
3. New World Order
4. Shed the Skin
5. Eight
6. Sleep Through This
- 2003 – Summer Demo
1. Empty
2. Separate
3. Summertime
- 2003 – 2/5's Demo (contains some alternate versions)
1. Empty
2. Summertime
3. Quicksand
4. Chasing the Sun

=== Singles ===
Year	Title	Album
2001	"New World Order"	Is This Room Getting Smaller
2001	"Instead Laugh"	Is This Room Getting Smaller
2001	"Shed the Skin"	Is This Room Getting Smaller
2007	"My Confession"	Onesidezero
2007	"Sleep"	Onesidezero

Drummer Rob Basile contributed drums for singer-songwriter Colleen Grace on albums Colleen Grace (2003) and Rosetta Hotel (2006), and for the track entitled "Where He Can Hide" by Tom Wolfe on the soundtrack of the film Me, Myself & Irene starring Jim Carrey (2000).

Vocalist Jasan Radford contributed vocals to the tracks "Run Around," "Going Digital," and "Strange" on the soundtrack of Digimon: The Movie, as well as the theme song for Power Rangers Time Force.

The song "Tapwater" from Is This Room Getting Smaller was featured in the film A Walk to Remember.

=== Music videos ===
Song	Album	Director(s)
"Eight"	Is This Room Getting Smaller (2001)	Jasan Radford
