= Gene Hoglan =

American drummer (born 1967)

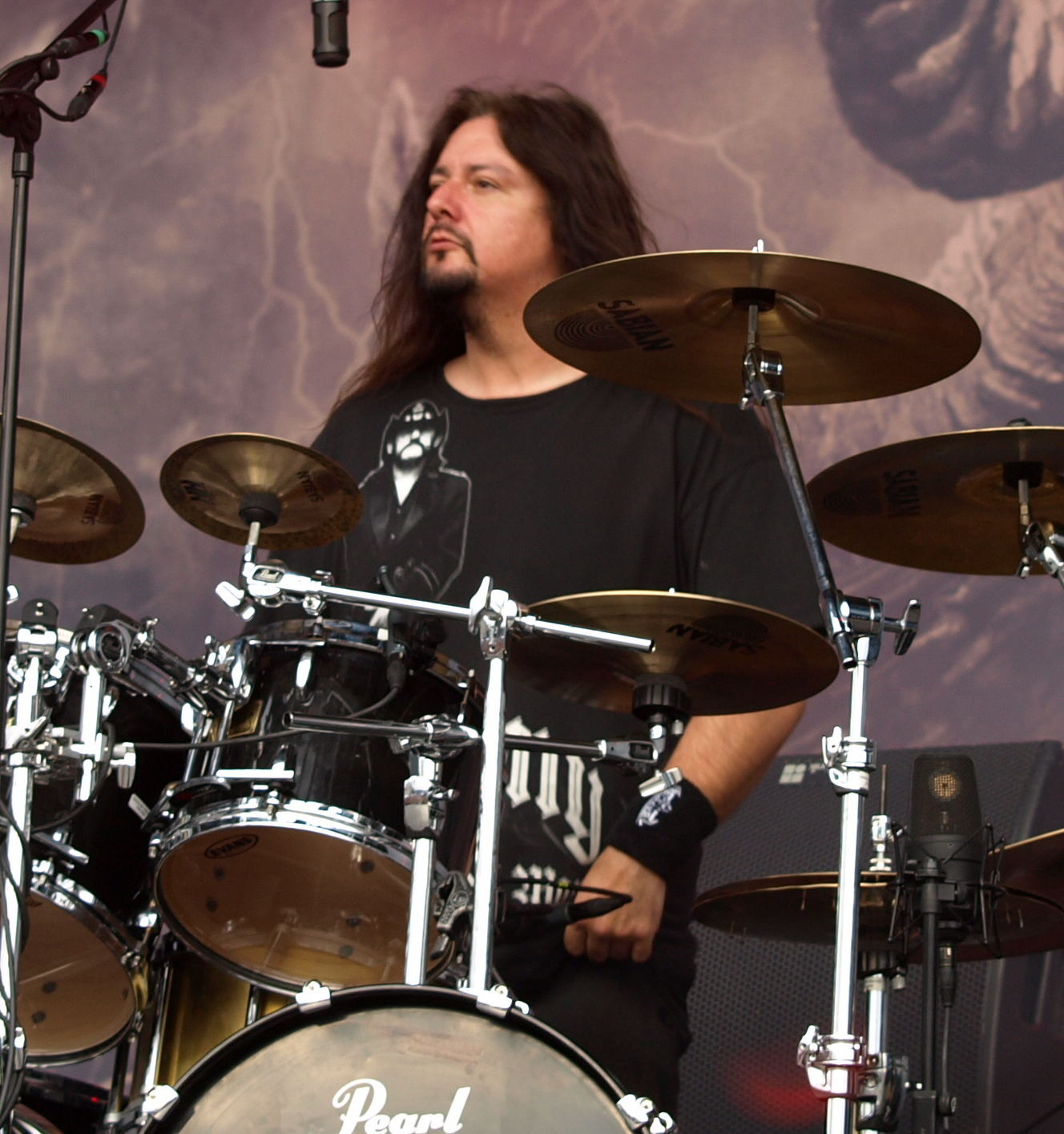
- Hoglan with Testament in 2013

Background information
- Also known as: The Atomic Clock, The Human Drum Machine
- Born: Eugene Victor Hoglan II; August 31, 1967 (age 59); Dallas, Texas, U.S.
- Genres: Heavy metal, death metal, thrash metal, industrial metal
- Occupation: Drummer
- Years active: 1982–present
- Member of: Dark Angel, Dethklok, Pitch Black Forecast, Tenet
- Formerly of: Old Man's Child, Testament, Death, Devin Townsend, Strapping Young Lad, Fear Factory, Meldrum, Forbidden, Viking, Zimmers Hole
- Website: hoglanindustries.com

Eugene Victor Hoglan II (born August 31, 1967) is an American drummer, known for his work with thrash metal bands Dark Angel and Testament. He is acclaimed for his creativity in drum arrangements, including use of abstract devices for percussion effects and his trademark lengthy double-kick drum rhythms. Though his playing style is very technically demanding, he retains high accuracy at extreme tempos, earning him the nicknames "The Atomic Clock" and "Human Drum Machine".

Hoglan has played for numerous metal bands across his career. He first established himself as the drummer of Dark Angel in the 1980s, and began to expand his repertoire in the early 1990s after that band split up. Since then, he has played for Death, Strapping Young Lad and the solo projects of its frontman Devin Townsend, Fear Factory, Dethklok and Testament, amid two Dark Angel reunions and participation in several other side projects. He released his own album, the Gene Hoglan: The Atomic Clock DVD, and served as Testament's longest-serving drummer.

Hoglan was featured on the cover of Modern Drummer magazine in November 2010. He also won Terrorizer magazine's Reader's Poll for Best Drummer 2010, and Modern Drummer magazine nominated Hoglan for Best Metal Drummer, and Best Recorded Performance (for Dethklok's Dethalbum II) on their 2011 ballot. He was nominated for Best Drummer in Revolver magazine's 2010 Reader's Poll.

== Early life and influences ==
Hoglan got his first drum kit when he was 13 and is completely self-taught. He started jamming along to his Kiss and Rush records, with Peter Criss and Neil Peart being his early influences. Hoglan's later influences include Cozy Powell, Tommy Aldridge, Robb Reiner, Rob "Wacko" Hunter, Phil "Philthy Animal" Taylor, Deen Castronovo, Terry Bozzio, Steve Gadd and Mark Craney.

== Career ==
In 1983, Hoglan began his music career as a roadie (lighting engineer) for the thrash metal band Slayer, where he also played the drums during concert soundchecks. He also provided backing vocals on the song "Evil Has No Boundaries", from the first Slayer album Show No Mercy. He contributed in the recording of Haunting the Chapel by holding Dave Lombardo's drum kit together during the recording of "Chemical Warfare" because there was no carpet in the studio. Lombardo had just had the double bass added to his kit and it was the first double bass Hoglan ever played. Lombardo was impressed with Hoglan's playing, and Hoglan gave Lombardo tips regarding the use of the double kick drum.

In 1984, Hoglan was part of the band War God with Michelle Meldrum. At the end of the same year he was asked to join the thrash metal band Dark Angel as the drummer. He penned most of the lyrics for Dark Angel's next three albums. He achieved greater fame during the mid-1990s playing with Death, at the same time that bandleader Chuck Schuldiner was taking that group into a more progressive style. Schuldiner stated that there had previously been animosity between himself and Hoglan, but the two eventually were able to reconcile their differences. He said: "It was just screwed-up, stupid shit that happened when Death and Dark Angel toured together, and I'm glad we were able to get past it. I wanted Gene to play on the record because he has a lot of experience, and he has his own unique style of playing."

Subsequently, he recorded one album with the thrash metal band Testament, and made the acquaintance of Canadian multi-instrumentalist Devin Townsend, forging a lasting friendship. Around this time, coming off of the final tour he performed with Death, Hoglan was approached by Slayer to replace a departing Paul Bostaph. Jon Dette, however, took the position, much to Hoglan's approval. He would go on to record several albums with Townsend, both as part of the speed/industrial/death metal band Strapping Young Lad and under Devin Townsend's name.

Hoglan was also part of thrash metal band Tenet, a side project of Strapping Young Lad guitarist Jed Simon, from 2003 to 2007. Hoglan left the band on amicable terms in January 2007. He was replaced by Adrian Erlandsson only to return to the group in June of the same year. Hoglan recorded his drum parts for the entirety of the following album in a mere two days.

On the Vancouver stop of Opeth's 2004 Lamentations tour, Hoglan stood in for drummer Martin Lopez, who was said to be having panic attacks. Opeth's drum tech had filled in for the two previous dates on the tour and Lopez rejoined the band for the Seattle, Washington, show.

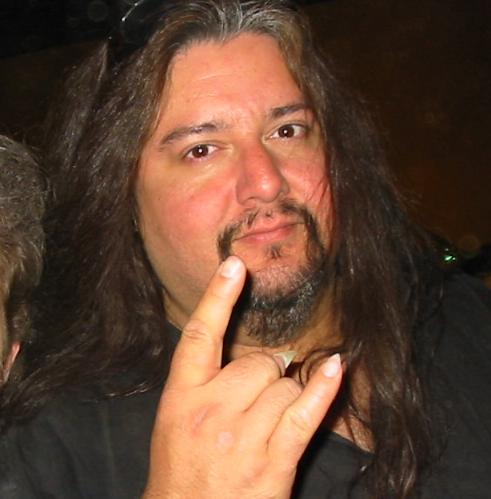
Hoglan at the Gods of Metal festival in 2005

In 2005, Hoglan stood in for Lopez for the majority of the Sounds of the Underground tour when Lopez began having more panic attacks. Hoglan played double duty by playing a set with Strapping Young Lad then performing with Opeth later in the evening. It was later announced Lopez had a rare blood disorder and was seeking treatment. Hoglan also appeared in Opeth's music video "The Grand Conjuration" as they filmed it on the tour while in Los Angeles, California.

Other bands have also recruited Hoglan as a session drummer. He has recorded albums with the Norwegian black metal band Old Man's Child and the Danish death metal band Daemon. Additionally he has done production and engineering work for other albums and demos. Hoglan also was recruited by Vancouver thrash metal band The Almighty Punchdrunk, and appeared as a band member for their only album to date, Music for Them Asses, released in 2001.

Hoglan is working with Dethklok, the band from the animated TV show Metalocalypse. The show was co-created by stand-up comedian/actor/musician Brendon Small, who also composes or performs all of the music. Hoglan features in Dethklok's debut album, The Dethalbum, which was released on September 25, 2007. He toured with Brendon Small and the live band during the summer of 2008. Besides working with Dethklok, Hoglan is also a guest star by voicing a health inspector in one episode of the series. He later performed on Dethalbum II, the sequel album released on September 29, 2009, and again toured with Dethklok. The two later collaborated to make Brendon Small's Galaktikon using extra studio time from the Dethklok studio sessions.

Hoglan filled in as the drummer for Unearth when their then drummer, Mike Justian, quit while on tour. He has also joined the metal band Pitch Black Forecast, with former Mushroomhead singer Jason Popson, as the band's permanent drummer. Even more recently, Hoglan was announced as the drummer for the reunited Bay Area Thrash metal band Forbidden's reunion tour, replacing original drummer Paul Bostaph.

Hoglan played drums on Zimmers Hole's third studio album When You Were Shouting at the Devil...We Were in League With Satan in 2008.

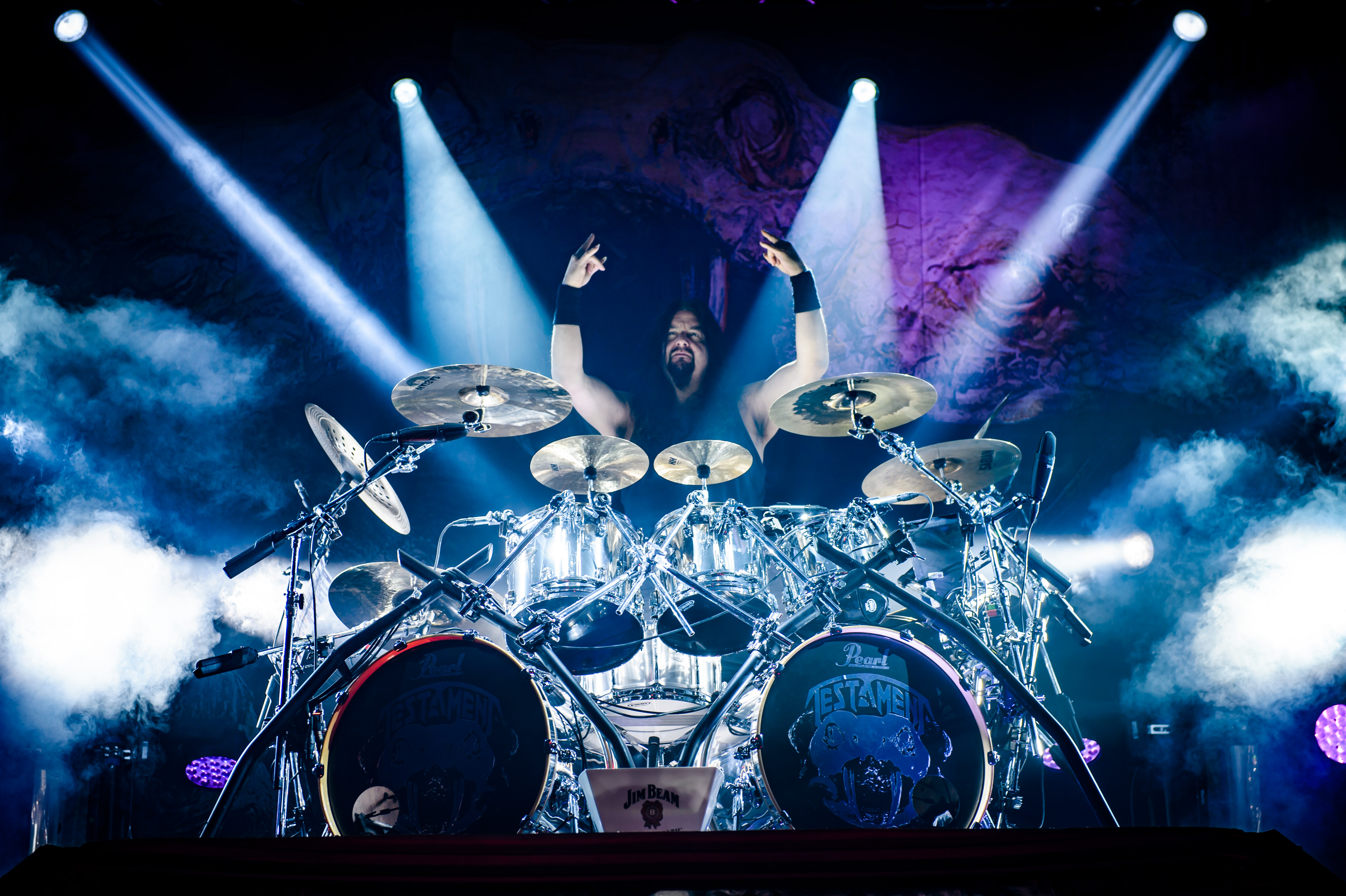
Gene Hoglan with Testament at Ruhrpott Metal Meeting 2017

In June 2011, he reunited with Testament, to record their eleventh studio album Dark Roots of Earth. On that album, he filled in for Paul Bostaph, who was unable to participate in the recording sessions because of a "serious injury". In 2012, he began touring with Testament, and on January 27 filled in for Charlie Benante of Anthrax. Although Hoglan was initially brought back to the band as a temporary drummer (in a fashion similar to his initial tenure when he recorded the Demonic album), he had since rejoined as a permanent member of Testament, recording two more albums with the band – Brotherhood of the Snake (2016) and Titans of Creation (2020) – and surpassing original drummer Louie Clemente as their longest-serving drummer. In 2018, Hoglan played with both Anthrax and Testament on the same nights during the Slayer farewell tour while Charlie Benante was recovering from carpal tunnel syndrome. Hoglan announced his second departure from Testament on January 21, 2022.

Gene was the drummer for Fear Factory from 2009 to 2012 and played on their release Mechanize; his association with the band ended when he was "no longer needed", and he expressed both a reluctance to join and a disappointment in the ultimate resolution of his tenure. He also participated in the recording sessions of Viking's reunion album, No Child Left Behind (2015).

Hoglan participated in the 2013 reunion of Dark Angel, who still play live occasionally to this day. The band announced in late March 2023 that it would continue on after the death of band member Jim Durkin and was planning to release a new album sometime in 2023 or 2024; the resulting album was 2025's Extinction Level Event. Hoglan has stated that Dark Angel has a "shit tons of songs" for a possible sixth album.

== Other ventures ==
In 2017, Hoglan released an art collection consisting of long-exposure photography of him playing with colorful glowing drumsticks, resulting in psychedelic imagery.

Hoglan made a guest appearance in the season 2 finale of The Eric Andre Show on Adult Swim.

== Personal life ==
Hoglan is married to Dark Angel guitarist Laura Christine. He was diagnosed with diabetes, and in 2025, lost around 200 pounds (91 kg).

== Equipment ==
Gene endorses and uses Pearl Drums, Sabian cymbals, Pro-Mark sticks and Evans heads.

=== Drum setup ===
- Drums – Pearl Reference Carbon Mist Finish, Black Hardware
  - 24x16 Bass Drum (x2)
  - 12x10 Tom
  - 14x12 Tom
  - 18x16 Floor Tom
  - 14x8 Brass Free Floating Snare Drum
- Cymbals – Sabian
  - 15" AAX X-Celerator Hi-Hats (or 15" AA Metal-X Hi Hats)
  - 19" Paragon Chinese
  - 22" HH Power Bell Ride
  - 18" AAX X-Plosion Fast Crash
  - 18" AAX Metal Crash
  - 8" Paragon Splash (originally owned by Neil Peart)
  - 10" Paragon Splash (originally owned by Neil Peart)
  - 19" AAX Metal Crash
  - 22" HH Power Bell Ride (x2)
  - 19" Paragon Chinese (or 20" AAX Chinese Brilliant) (x2)
- Drumheads – Evans
  - G2 Clear
  - SD Dry
- Pedals:
  - Tama Camco (until 2015–2016) (×2)
  - Pearl Eliminator Redline (nowadays) (×2)
- Hardware – Pearl
  - B1000 Boom Stand (x7)
  - H2000 Hi-Hat Stand
  - S2000 Snare Stand
  - T2000 Double Tom Stand
  - D2000 Throne
- Other
  - Pro-Mark 2B Nylon Tip Drumsticks

== Bands ==
Current

- Dark Angel (1984-1992, 2002-2005, 2013-present)
- DTA: Death to All (2012-present)
- Pitch Black Forecast (2005-present)
- Tenet (1996-present)
- Dethklok (2007-2016, 2019-present)

Former

- Death (1993-1995)
- Fear Factory (2009-2012)
- Forbidden (2011)
- Meldrum (2008-2009)
- Phantasm (1987)
- Strapping Young Lad (1995-2007)
- Viking (2011-2013)
- Zimmers Hole (2007-2018)
- Testament (1997-1998, 2011-2022)

Live

- Anthrax (2012, 2018)
- Forbidden (2011)
- Opeth (2004)
- Unearth (2007)

Session

- Old Man's Child (1998)
- The Almighty Punchdrunk (1999)
- Daemon (2002)
- Devin Townsend (1998-2001)
- Frygirl (2001)
- Just Cause (2001)
- Naphobia (1995)
- Wargod (1985)

Timeline

== Discography ==
Hoglan played drums on the following albums, unless otherwise noted.

- 1983: Slayer – Show No Mercy (backing vocals on "Evil Has No Boundaries")
- 1985: Wargod – Wargod (demo)
- 1986: Dark Angel – Darkness Descends
- 1987: Phantasm – Wreckage (demo)
- 1989: Dark Angel – Leave Scars
- 1990: Dark Angel – Live Scars (EP)
- 1991: Dark Angel – Time Does Not Heal
- 1992: Dark Angel – Decade of Chaos
- 1992: Silent Scream – From the Darkest Depths of the Imagination (mixing and production)
- 1993: Death – Individual Thought Patterns
- 1995: Death – Symbolic
- 1995: Naphobia – Of Hell (guest drummer)
- 1997: Strapping Young Lad – City
- 1997: Testament – Demonic
- 1998: Old Man's Child – Ill–Natured Spiritual Invasion
- 1998: Strapping Young Lad – No Sleep Till Bedtime
- 1998: Devin Townsend – Infinity
- 1998: Devin Townsend – Christeen Plus 4 Demos (EP)
- 1999: The Almighty Punchdrunk – Music for Them Asses
- 2000: Devin Townsend – Physicist
- 2001: Devin Townsend – Terria
- 2001: Just Cause – Finger It Out
- 2001: Frygirl – Someone Please Kill Me (Congas)
- 2002: Daemon – Eye for an Eye
- 2003: Strapping Young Lad – Strapping Young Lad
- 2003: Tenet – Sovereign (demo)
- 2005: Strapping Young Lad – Alien
- 2005: Opeth – played drums in the video for "The Grand Conjuration" from their Ghost Reveries album
- 2005: Ani Kyd – Evil Needs Candy Too
- 2006: Strapping Young Lad – The New Black
- 2007: Meldrum – Blowin' Up the Machine (guest drummer)
- 2007: Dethklok – The Dethalbum
- 2007: Dethklok – ...And You Will Know Us by the Trail of Dead/Dethklok
- 2007: Mr. Plow – Apocalypse Plow
- 2008: Zimmers Hole – When You Were Shouting at the Devil...We Were in League With Satan
- 2008: Pitch Black Forecast – Absentee
- 2008: Mechanism – Inspired Horrific
- 2009: Fattooth – Fattooth
- 2009: Dethklok – Dethalbum II
- 2009: Tenet – Sovereign
- 2010: Fear Factory – Mechanize
- 2012: Brendon Small – Brendon Small's Galaktikon
- 2012: Testament – Dark Roots of Earth
- 2012: Pitch Black Forecast – Burning in Water... Drowning in Flame
- 2012: Meldrum – Lifer
- 2012: Dethklok – Dethalbum III
- 2012: Sylencer – A Lethal Dose of Truth (guest drummer on "Get It Up")
- 2012: Memorain – Evolution
- 2013: Dethklok – The Doomstar Requiem
- 2014: Pitch Black Forecast – As the World Burns
- 2015: Viking – No Child Left Behind
- 2016: Testament – Brotherhood of the Snake
- 2017: Brendon Small – Brendon Small's Galaktikon II
- 2019: Bear McCreary – Godzilla: King of the Monsters (soundtrack)
- 2019: Bryan Beller – Scenes from the Flood
- 2020: Testament – Titans of Creation
- 2023: Dethklok – Dethalbum IV
- 2024: Bear McCreary – The Singularity
- 2025: Dark Angel – Extinction Level Event

== Videography ==
- Dark Angel - Ultimate Revenge 2 (VHS, 1989)
- Strapping Young Lad - For Those Aboot to Rock: Live at the Commodore (DVD, 2004, Century Media Records)
- Gene Hoglan - The Atomic Clock (DVD, 2010, Hoglan Industries)
- Behind the Player: Dimmu Borgir (DVD, 2010, Alfred Music Publishing)
- Bryan Beller - "Mastering Tone and Versatility (DVD, 2012, Alfred Music Publishing)
- Gene Hoglan - The Clock Strikes Two (DVD, 2016, Hoglan Industries)
