= Dethalbum II =

Studio album by Dethklok
- Released: September 29, 2009
- Recorded: 2008–2009
- Studio: Bombshelter Studios and "The Danger Zone", Los Angeles
- Genre: Melodic death metal
- Length: 52:00
- Label: Williams Street
- Producer: Brendon Small, Ulrich Wild

Dethklok chronology
Adult Swim Presents: ...And You Will Know Us by the Trail of Dead on Tour with Dethklok (2007)	Dethalbum II (2009)	Dethalbum III (2012)

Alternative cover
- Deluxe edition artwork

Singles from Dethalbum II
- 1. "Bloodlines" Released: September 6, 2009

Dethalbum II is the second full-length album by virtual band Dethklok, from the animated series Metalocalypse. The CD and deluxe CD/DVD were released on September 29, 2009. The album was later released on LP to the United States and Canada.

== Background ==
The album was recorded at Bombshelter Studios and "The Danger Zone" in Los Angeles. The deluxe edition includes a bonus DVD with 52 minutes of never-before-released music videos featured in the 2008 Dethklok tour. Two bonus tracks were originally promised for the deluxe edition of the album; however, Brendon Small had never recorded or planned to include bonus tracks. The announcement was a marketing error. A guitar transcription book of this album was released through Alfred Music Publishing. Six tracks from this album are included in the Dethklok bass tab anthology.

== Other media appearances ==
"Laser Cannon Deth Sentence" is featured as a downloadable track for Guitar Hero 5. "Bloodlines" is featured as a playable track in Guitar Hero: Warriors of Rock. The song "The Cyborg Slayers" was featured in the soundtrack for the game Saints Row: The Third.

== Reception ==
Professional ratings
Review scores
Source	Rating
Allmusic	3.5/5 stars
Alternative Press	4/5 stars
The Boston Globe	favorable
CHARTattack	5/5 stars
Exclaim!	favorable

The album peaked at number 15 on the Billboard 200 chart and sold 45,000 copies in its first week of release.

== Track listing ==
All tracks are written by Brendon Small. Virtual writing credits attributed to Dethklok.

No.	Title	Length
1.	"Bloodlines" (from "Dethcarraldo")	3:30
2.	"The Gears" (from "Dethsources")	4:21
3.	"Burn the Earth" (from "Dethvengeance")	3:59
4.	"Laser Cannon Deth Sentence" (from "Dethecution")	4:35
5.	"Black Fire Upon Us" (from "Dethrelease")	5:40
6.	"Dethsupport" (from "The Revengencers")	2:42
7.	"The Cyborg Slayers" (later used in "Dethmas")	4:16
8.	"I Tamper with the Evidence at the Murder Site of Odin" (from "Dethlessons")	4:30
9.	"Murmaider II: The Water God"	5:43
10.	"Comet Song" (from "P.R. Klok")	3:48
11.	"Symmetry" (from "Dethfashion")	4:31
12.	"Volcano" (from "Dethdoubles")	4:18
Total length:		52:00

Deluxe DVD
No.	Title	Length
1.	"Deththeme" (Extended Version)
2.	"Briefcase Full of Guts"
3.	"Birthday Dethday"
4.	"Awaken"
5.	"Bloodrocuted"
6.	"Duncan Hills Coffee Jingle"
7.	"Dethharmonic"
8.	"Castratikron"
9.	"Go Forth and Die"
10.	"Hatredcopter"
11.	"Murmaider"
12.	"Thunderhorse"
13.	"Go into the Water"
14.	"Fansong" (hidden track)

== Personnel ==
=== Virtual personnel from Metalocalypse ===
- Nathan Explosion – vocals, lyricist
- Pickles the Drummer – drums
- Skwisgaar Skwigelf – lead guitar
- Toki Wartooth – rhythm guitar
- William Murderface – bass

==== Production ====
- Dethklok – production
- Dick "Magic Ears" Knubbler – production
- Charles Offdensen – legal

=== Actual personnel ===
- Brendon Small – guitars, keyboards, vocals, bass, production
- Gene Hoglan – drums
- Bryan Beller – bass ("The Gears")

==== Production ====
- Ulrich Wild – production, engineering, mixing (at "Noize in the Attic")
- Assistant engineered by Mike Gerlach – assistant engineering
- Raidar – assistant mixing
- Dave Collins Mastering (Los Angeles, CA) – mastering
- Antonio Canobbio – cover artwork
