= Full Metal Jackie =

American radio show

Jackie Kajzer
- Born: January 18, 1982 (age 44)
- Occupations: Radio personality, DJ, artist manager
- Years active: 1999–present
- Known for: Radio shows; Loudwire
- Awards: FMQB's "Metal Host of the Year"
- Website: fullmetaljackieradio.com

Full Metal Jackie is a nationally accredited and syndicated radio metal show created and hosted by Jackie Kajzer. Kajzer is known for her unique playlists and detailed interviews with rock artists, including Ozzy Osbourne, Slayer, Zakk Wylde and Children of Bodom. She has won FMQB's "Metal Host of the Year" for four years in a row. She is also known for being the Black carpet correspondent at Revolver's Golden Gods awards and hosted MTV2's Headbangers Ball.

Kajzer has also written a book about the top 50 most influential songs in heavy metal and their true meanings. In 2011, she also released a merchandise and clothing line.

== Career ==
Kajzer began her career hosting a radio show at Seton Hall's Pirate Radio, WSOU. Shortly after graduation, she took her career to WHTG (Neptune, New Jersey) and WDHA-FM (Dover, New Jersey) as a radio personality. In 2001, she moved to Los Angeles and joined the staff of The Firm, an artist and talent management company. At The Firm, she advanced to Radio Promotions Director, where she worked with numerous metal bands such as Korn, Otep, Limp Bizkit, Linkin Park, Staind, Audioslave and Static-X. Also during this time, Kajzer discovered the band Five Finger Death Punch and helped to launch their careers.

Soon after a brief stay in KBZT and at KNAC, she began to host and produce her own heavy metal radio show, CHAOS, on Indie 103.1. Full Metal Jackie is now syndicated on over 75 stations nationwide.

In June 2013, Kajzer launched Full Metal Jackie Radio, a hard rock and heavy metal radio station on iHeartRadio.

== See also ==
- iHeartRadio
- Loudwire
