= Dethklok =

Animated American metal band

- The members of Dethklok. From left to right: William Murderface, Skwisgaar Skwigelf, Nathan Explosion, Pickles, and Toki Wartooth.

Background information
- Also known as: Metalocalypse: Dethklok
- Origin: United States, Norway, Sweden
- Genres: Melodic death metal
- Years active: 2006–2016; 2019–present
- Label: Crystal Mountain
- Members: See members

Dethklok is a melodic death metal virtual band featured in the Adult Swim animated television series Metalocalypse, known for its satirical or parodic lyrical themes.

The first official Dethklok album was released on September 25, 2007, entitled The Dethalbum. The album debuted at number 21 on Billboard magazine's Top 200 list. The band released Dethalbum II on September 29, 2009, and toured with Mastodon, High on Fire, and Converge. The band's third album, Dethalbum III, was released on October 16, 2012. The soundtrack to the special episode Metalocalypse: The Doomstar Requiem was released on October 29, 2013.

A real band was set up in order to perform the band's music in live shows. Both bands were created by Brendon Small and Tommy Blacha. The music heard on Metalocalypse is performed by Brendon Small, with others needed for live concerts and albums. On August 25, 2017, Brendon Small released his second solo album, Brendon Small's Galaktikon II, which has been unofficially referred to as "a new Dethklok album", although it was released under Small's name due to Adult Swim holding the rights to the band name. However, after a five-year absence, the band returned to perform at Adult Swim Festival 2019. Their fourth album, and first in over a decade, Dethalbum IV, was released in August 2023, along with a soundtrack album to the film Metalocalypse: Army of the Doomstar. The band embarked on a USA tour from August to October 2023, with co-headliners Babymetal and supported by Jason Richardson.

== Fictional background ==
In the Metalocalypse series, Dethklok is depicted as the world's most popular death metal band. The members of Dethklok reside in a castle elevated high above ground called Mordhaus, which serves as their recording studio. Beyond their extreme financial status, they also oversee a personal organization of devoted workers known as Klokateers, who act as their personal servants, as well as their roadies, security personnel, and private military squadron. The band's fan base includes billions of metal fanatics, who frequently endanger themselves watching the band perform live, as their costly shows are commonly held in dangerous locations and include numerous hazards such as excessive pyrotechnics, aircraft, lasers, and giant bladed pendulums, with many shows concluding in multiple attendee deaths. With their widespread commercial success and lucrative sponsorship contracts, Dethklok is ranked as the world's seventh largest economy by the end of the second season.

Despite their otherworldly success, the members of Dethklok are often portrayed as incompetent at almost everything unrelated to their profession. The band struggles to perform everyday tasks, including grocery shopping, preparing food, and maintaining proper social relationships. Throughout the series, they are often assisted by their manager and lawyer, Charles Foster Offdensen, who frequently attempts to prevent the band from making poor decisions. The band's actions and uncanny misfortune have caught the attention of an Illuminati-style council known as The Tribunal. The Tribunal is portrayed as Dethklok's antagonist throughout the series and secretly monitors their actions in almost every episode. They describe Dethklok as the "world's greatest cultural force." The leader of The Tribunal (Mr. Salacia), however, frequently instructs the other members to allow Dethklok to do as they will.

== Band members ==
=== Fictional band members ===
==== Nathan Explosion ====
- Voiced by: Brendon Small

Nathan Explosion is the frontman, lead vocalist and "lyrical visionary" of Dethklok. Portrayed as a tall and stocky guy with long black hair, black nails, and green eyes, Nathan speaks with a death growl even when not singing; he admits in one episode that he knows his lyrics are largely incomprehensible. He did not speak a word until he was five years old and in high school excelled only in frog dissection and football. According to his dating profile, Nathan describes his ethnicity as "White/Native American". He was raised in New Port Richey, Florida. He is the lead songwriting force in Dethklok, and uses violent imagery or plot elements when writing and composing song material. Nathan is slightly more sensible than the rest of the band, and a great deal more emotionally stable, though he is still incompetent at most things in life such as the use of a grocery store or reading a cooking recipe. Despite this, he does seem to have some knowledge in specific areas, such as negotiating a contract, extensive knowledge of rock culture, and a proficiency in French. He attempts to get his GED in "Go Forth And Die", and only fails in part due to the band's influence, and in "Fatherklok" tells Murderface not to interfere with Skwisgaar's father issues. Nathan sometimes acts in a parental manner towards Toki, and in the first episode insisted that the band never drink before a show (notwithstanding the fact they had all been drinking all day).

In the episode "Fatherklok", it was revealed that Nathan enjoys an excellent relationship with his father. He does, however, find his parents embarrassing as they are normal parents and not "brutal" as seen in "Dethfam". A brief montage shows Nathan and his father fishing, racing go-karts, and playing Scrabble. He is the only member of the band who spends time with or likes his father, stating in the episode "Dethdad" he often drinks beer and goes hunting with his father regularly and would be very sad if his father died.

Small described Nathan as a "quarterback", in part to his contribution to his high school football team, and based his character's appearance and performance style on current Cannibal Corpse vocalist George "Corpsegrinder" Fisher.

==== Skwisgaar Skwigelf ====
- Voiced by: Brendon Small

Skwisgaar Skwigelf is Dethklok's lead guitarist. He is described as "a handsome guy who thinks and knows he's the greatest thing in the world". Show creator Brendon Small compares Skwisgaar's attitude and technical playing style to Yngwie Malmsteen. He is tall and thin with long blond hair, a studded belt with a skull buckle, and blue eyes. He played a Gibson Explorer for the first three seasons, but switched to the Gibson "Thunderhorse" Explorer for the fourth. He often carries around his guitars even when not playing. He is often referred to as the fastest guitar player in the world. He is depicted as having extreme sexual prowess and a preference for plump or elderly women. Hailing from Sweden, Skwisgaar has a marked Swedish accent and often makes mistakes when conjugating verbs. He is responsible for the majority of the arrangement of Dethklok's songs, writing the guitar lines as well as Murderface's bass lines. Skwisgaar also typically discards and re-records the rhythm guitar (and the bass guitar parts) recorded by Toki Wartooth for Dethklok's albums and frequently belittles as well competes with him over his guitar playing skills. Nonetheless, when Toki originally auditioned for the band, it was Skwisgaar who requested that Toki be chosen, feeling that no other guitarist made Skwisgaar play as well as he did. In the episode "Skwisklok", it is revealed that Skwisgaar is allergic to cilantro.

==== Toki Wartooth ====
- Voiced by: Tommy Blacha, Mike Keneally (singing voice in Metalocalypse: The Doomstar Requiem)

Toki Wartooth is Dethklok's rhythm guitarist. He typically played a Gibson Flying V, but has switched to the Brendon Small "Snow Falcon" V for the fourth season. A native of "an abandoned town near Lillehammer", Norway, he was forced to constantly perform manual labor by his abusive cultist parents. He has a distinct accent and often inappropriately pluralizes words, but refers to Pickles as "Pickle". Like Skwisgaar, his fellow Scandinavian, he often says "am" instead of "is" (usually with an "s" on the end, such as "he ams incapable.") Visually, he has a distinct Fu Manchu moustache, long brown hair, and very pale blue eyes. He is also shown to be extremely physically fit, in stark contrast to the rest of his bandmates.

Toki is the only Dethklok member with no prior band experience, as well as the only one not with the band in its initial form, having been chosen to replace the violent and egomaniacal Magnus Hammersmith. Small explains Toki's relationship with Skwisgaar as "...Norwegian to Skwisgaar's Swedish, pompous attitude. And, again, a second-class citizen in the same band", and compared his guitar playing style to that of Iron Maiden.

In contrast to the deep cynicism, grim outlook, promiscuity, and alcohol abuse of the other band members, Toki's character is generally childlike, innocent, and good-natured, yet traumatized and can be quite violent when pushed too far. He has a boyish bedroom complete with action figures, stuffed animals, and wall posters, and a prominent hobby of his is building model planes. He is a type 2 diabetic and requires insulin shots. One of his more bizarre traits is a hysterical phobia of antique coins.

A recurring plot point is the death of people Toki grows fond of, including a guitar teacher and his father; the Tribunal has described him as an "angel of death". Any living being that gets close to Toki (with the exception of Dr. Rockso, Charles and his bandmates) tends to die after a brief period of time.

==== Pickles ====
- Voiced by: Brendon Small

Pickles is Dethklok's drummer. He was raised in Tomahawk, Wisconsin and speaks with an Upper Midwestern accent. He refers to himself as "very Irish American" and has long red hair, styled into dreadlocks and a comb-over skullet, and green eyes. He is depicted as having an average build with a strong propensity for drugs and alcohol abuse stemming from feelings of resentment towards his family. He comes off as the most socially-capable member of the band, able to grasp most concepts outside the scope of death metal that the other four cannot. In later seasons, this capacity often puts him at odds with Nathan, though ironically they are the only two the others can talk to on certain levels. Charles Offdensen refers to Nathan and Pickles as the "most responsible" members in the group, much to their disdain. Pickles is a multi-talented performer, whom IGN described as "the band's deepest thinker". Pickles is the former front-man of a group called Snakes 'n' Barrels, providing the vocals and performing as the lead guitarist.

Brendon Small used the voice of Pickles on The Dethalbum to sing the chorus of the song "Hatredcopter", as well as the entirety of "Kill You", a song by Snakes N' Barrels "covered" by Dethklok, which serves as a bonus track. Describing the character, Small said, "I thought the drummer should be able to do a bunch of stuff, like Roger Taylor in Queen. Even though it's not based on his personality, it's what he can do in the band and what parts of the songs he does contribute to."

The original design of the character was changed to avoid his looking too much like Devin Townsend.

==== William Murderface ====
- Voiced by: Tommy Blacha

William Murderface is Dethklok's bassist, who plays a Gibson Thunderbird Studio 5-string. He has brown hair, green eyes, a heavy lateral lisp and a gap in his front teeth. He has tattoos on the top and bottom parts of his abdomen, the top reading "Pobody's Nerfect", and the bottom saying "This Mess Is A Place". When he was a baby, Murderface's deranged and mentally unstable father killed his wife — Murderface's mother — with a chainsaw before turning it upon himself in front of Murderface in a grisly murder-suicide (Murderface believes this happened because he was ugly). This left Murderface to be raised by his grandparents.

Murderface is "a self-hating bass player who's always trying to act like he's more important than he is", in part because his bass playing is usually mixed out completely. Although Murderface's musical contribution is apparently totally unnecessary to the group's sound, Dethklok realizes when they expel him from the band in "Dethsiduals" that he imposes a mentality of negativity and hatred upon the band that is crucial to their songwriting.

Brendon Small describes Murderface as "thin-skinned and incredibly sensitive and just wants to be accepted constantly but can't get that because he's such a dick and pushes people away". He is sensitive about his weight and appearance, which his bandmates often obliviously exacerbate. Additionally, he is generally disliked by the opposite sex to the point that even female Klokateers, who are absolutely devoted to Dethklok, reject his advances. Murderface's voice was originally achieved by Tommy Blacha putting paper towels inside his mouth when voicing the character, but he later refined his technique to forgo the paper towels.

==== Magnus Hammersmith ====
- Voiced by: Marc Maron (speaking) and Brendon Small (singing)

Magnus Hammersmith was the first rhythm guitarist of Dethklok, but was kicked out of the band very early for his violent behavior. He returns to antagonize and threaten the band several times.

=== Real-life band members ===
Studio members:

- Brendon Small – guitars, lead vocals, bass, keyboards (2006–present)
- Gene Hoglan – drums (2007–present)

Live members:

- Brendon Small – guitars, lead vocals (2007–present)
- Gene Hoglan – drums (2007–present)
- Bryan Beller – bass, backing vocals (2007–present; studio member since 2012)
- Pete Griffin – bass, backing vocals (2012, 2019–present)
- Nili Brosh – guitars (2019–present)

Former members:

- Mike Keneally – guitars, backing vocals (2007–2016)

== Touring history ==
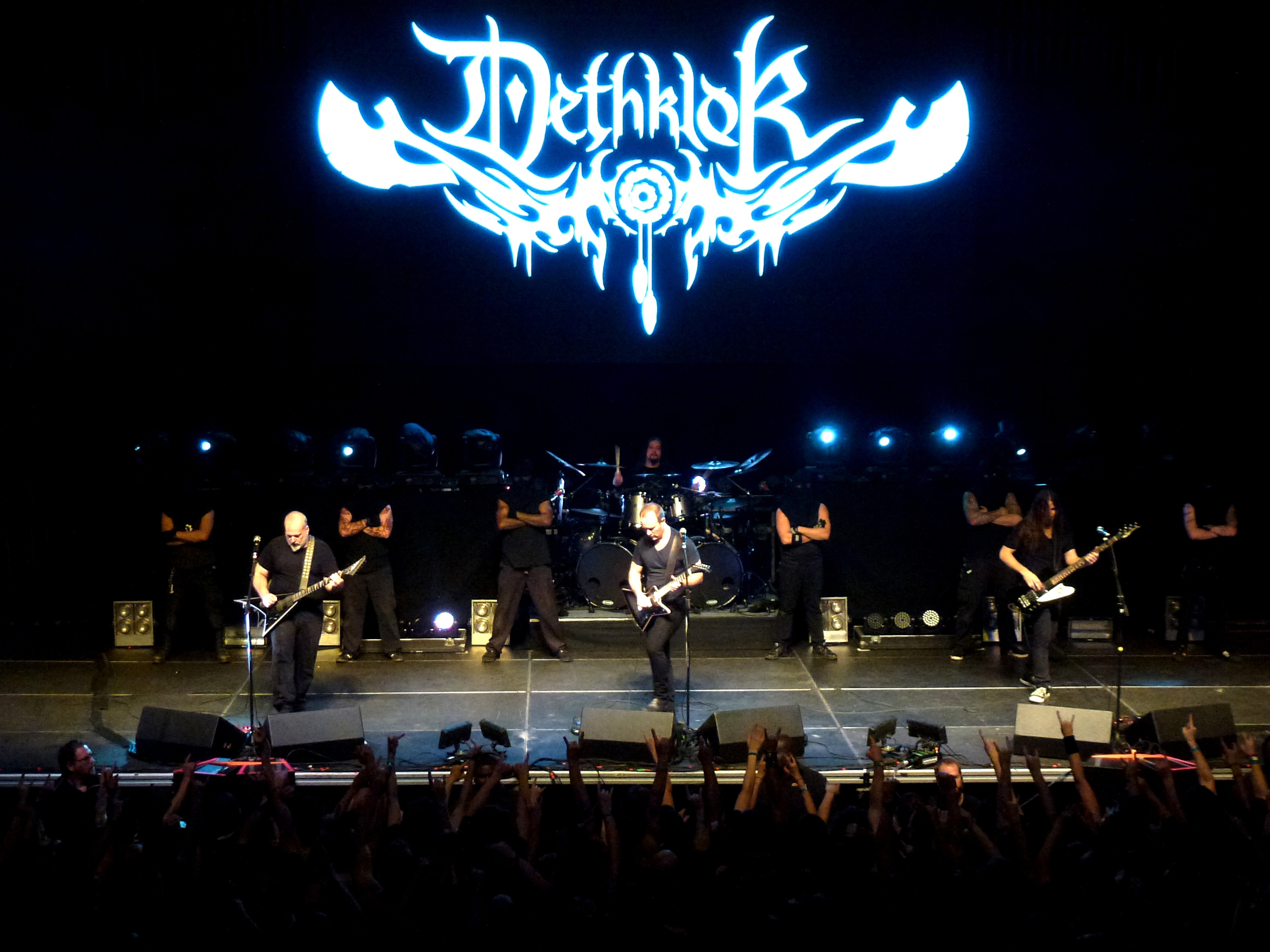
Mike Keneally, Brendon Small, Gene Hoglan and Bryan Beller performing live at the Tabernacle in Atlanta on December 8, 2012.

In late 2007, Adult Swim organized a promotional tour featuring Dethklok and ...And You Will Know Us by the Trail of Dead. The tour comprised performances at twelve college campuses, with tickets available to students only (except for 50 tickets set aside for the UCLA show in the Los Angeles area). The band featured Brendon Small, guitarist Mike Keneally, bassist Bryan Beller and drummer Gene Hoglan. Tour information was made available on Adult Swim's promotional site. In an interview with Ultimate Guitar, Brendon Small described the tour as being "like Gorillaz, with the animated characters" with Small's ensemble of musicians performing visibly.

In a February 2008 interview on California radio station Indie 103.1 with Full Metal Jackie, plans for a summer 2008 tour were announced. Brendon Small described the tour as being like "a Disney ride but with murder". Dethklok toured the US in June and early July with Chimaira and Soilent Green. In April 2008, 27 dates were announced.

Dethklok performed at Heavy MTL on June 21, 2008. They then toured with Chimaira and Soilent Green during June and July 2008. During the June 5, 2008, show at The Fillmore in San Francisco, an electrical fire broke out during Soilent Green's set. Attendees were hesitant to leave the building thinking that it was part of the show (in their fictional universe, Dethklok is infamous for causing disasters that result in deaths), which created a dangerous situation, but they soon realized that the fire was real and evacuated and the concert was rescheduled.

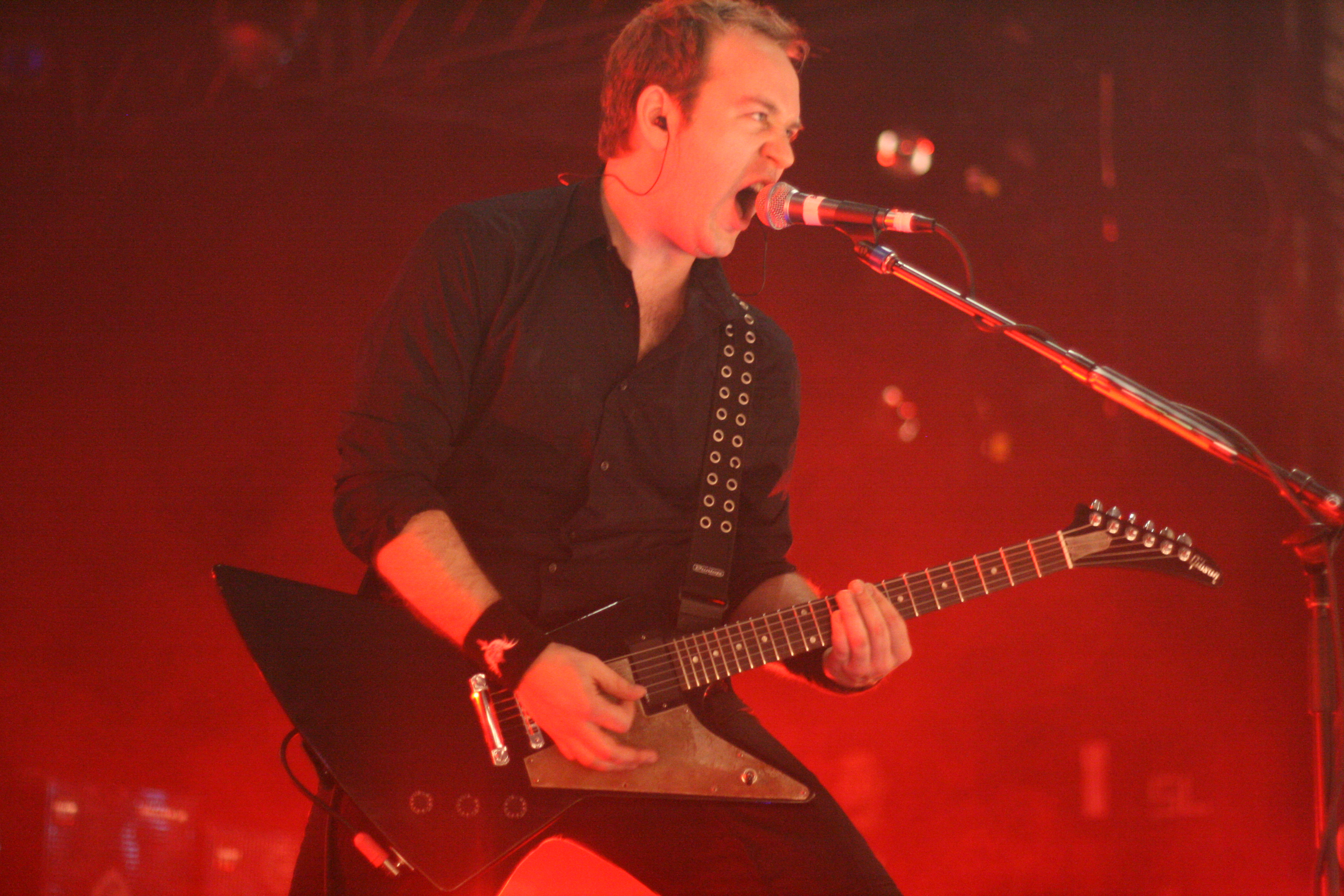
Small on stage in 2008

Dethklok toured with co-headliner Mastodon, High on Fire, and Converge during October and November 2009. The band performed in San Bernardino on July 9, 2011, at the Mayhem Festival in place of Megadeth. Dethklok played a free show at San Diego Comic-Con on July 13, 2012, on the USS Midway. Dethklok was scheduled to play in Toronto, Ontario at the Heavy T.O. festival on August 11, 2012, and also in Montreal, QC at Heavy MTL Festival on August 12, 2012; however, Dethklok's appearances at both festivals were cancelled. Dethklok was also scheduled to play the main stage for both days of Knotfest on August 17 and 18, 2012; however, Dethklok's appearance was cancelled. The band was scheduled to co-headline a tour in North America with Lamb of God (with special guest Gojira) in August 2012; this tour was cancelled due to bail hearings at the time for Randy Blythe in the Czech Republic.

Dethklok toured North America, in support of Dethalbum III, with Machine Head, All That Remains and the Black Dahlia Murder during November and December 2012. Bassist Pete Griffin filled in for several shows while Bryan Beller was touring with his band, the Aristocrats.

Dethklok performed at Festival Supreme on October 25, 2014, in Los Angeles, California. Dethklok then performed at Adult Swim Festival 2019. Dethklok, afterwards, went on to play the Adult Swim Festival 2022. The band then went on to tour in North America, in support of Dethalbum IV, with Babymetal and Jason Richardson from August to October 2023.

In the spring of 2024, Dethklok headlined the "Mutilation on a Spring Night" tour, running from early April to early May in the United States. Support on the tour was provided by DragonForce and Nekrogoblikon.

Dethklok are scheduled to tour in 2026. The band are confirmed to be appearing at Welcome to Rockville taking place in Daytona Beach, Florida in May 2026. In February 2026, the band was also announced as part of the lineup for the Louder Than Life music festival in Louisville, scheduled to take place in September. Dethklok co-headlined the Amonklok tour along with Swedish melodic death metal band Amon Amarth in April and May of 2026.

== Awards ==
Dethklok received the award for best international band during the 2009 Revolver Golden God Awards. A clip of the band's acceptance speech was played after they were announced as the recipients. They were presented the award by Chuck Billy, best known for his work as the vocalist for the thrash metal band Testament. In 2013, Dethalbum III won an Independent Music Award for Best Metal/Hardcore Album.

== Discography ==
=== Studio albums ===
Year	Album	Peak chart positions		
Year	Album	US	US Rock	US Hard Rock
2007	The Dethalbum	21	5	3
2009	Dethalbum II	15	6	5
2012	Dethalbum III	10	1	1
2023	Dethalbum IV	—	—	—
"—" denotes album that failed to chart

=== Soundtrack albums ===
Year	Album	Peak chart positions		
Year	Album	US	US Rock	US Hard Rock
2013	The Doomstar Requiem	—	—	24
2023	Army of the Doomstar	—	—	—
"—" denotes album that failed to chart

=== EPs ===
- Adult Swim Presents: ...And You Will Know Us by the Trail of Dead on Tour with Dethklok (split CD) (2007)

=== Singles ===
- "Bloodrocuted" (2007)
- "Thunderhorse" (2007)
- "Bloodlines" (2009)
- "I Ejaculate Fire" (2012)
- "Blazing Star" (2013)
- "Aortic Desecration" (2023)

=== Guest appearances ===
- Zimmers Hole – When You Were Shouting at the Devil... We Were in League with Satan (guest vocals on "The Vowel Song" by Nathan Explosion) (2008)

=== Music videos ===
==== As lead band ====
Year	Title	Director(s)	Album	Release for music video
2007	"Bloodrocuted"	Jon Schnepp & Brendon Small	The Dethalbum	The Dethalbum deluxe edition bonus DVD, Metalocalypse season 2 DVD, Dethalbum II deluxe edition bonus DVD
2008	"Murmaider"	Jon Schnepp	The Dethalbum	Metalocalypse season 2 DVD, Dethalbum II deluxe edition bonus DVD
2008	"Briefcase Full of Guts"	Jon Schnepp	The Dethalbum	Dethalbum II deluxe edition bonus DVD
2008	"Birthday Dethday"	Jon Schnepp	The Dethalbum	Dethalbum II deluxe edition bonus DVD
2008	"Awaken"	Chris Prynoski	The Dethalbum	Dethalbum II deluxe edition bonus DVD
2008	"Duncan Hills Coffee Jingle"	Jon Schnepp	The Dethalbum	Dethalbum II deluxe edition bonus DVD
2008	"Dethharmonic"	Mark Brooks	The Dethalbum	Dethalbum II deluxe edition bonus DVD
2008	"Castratikron"	Mark Brooks	The Dethalbum	Dethalbum II deluxe edition bonus DVD
2008	"Go Forth and Die"	Chris Prynoski	The Dethalbum	Dethalbum II deluxe edition bonus DVD
2008	"Hatredcopter"	Jon Schnepp	The Dethalbum	Dethalbum II deluxe edition bonus DVD
2008	"Thunderhorse"	Jon Schnepp	The Dethalbum	Dethalbum II deluxe edition bonus DVD
2008	"Go into the Water"	Jon Schnepp	The Dethalbum	Dethalbum II deluxe edition bonus DVD
2009	"Bloodlines"	Jon Schnepp	Dethalbum II	Metalocalypse Season 3 Blu-ray extras
2009	"Dethsupport"	Jon Schnepp	Dethalbum II	Metalocalypse Season 3 Blu-ray extras
2009	"The Gears"	Jon Schnepp	Dethalbum II	Metalocalypse Season 3 Blu-ray extras
2009	"Burn the Earth"	Jon Schnepp	Dethalbum II	Metalocalypse Season 3 Blu-ray extras
2009	"Black Fire Upon Us"	Jon Schnepp	Dethalbum II	Metalocalypse Season 3 Blu-ray extras
2012	"I Ejaculate Fire"	Mark Brooks	Dethalbum III	Dethalbum III deluxe edition bonus DVD
2012	"The Galaxy"	Felipe Salazar	Dethalbum III	Dethalbum III deluxe edition bonus DVD

==== As featured band ====
Year	Title	Director(s)
2010	"Black Rain" (by Soundgarden)	Brendon Small
2013	'tallica Parking Lot (short film) (by Robert Trujillo)	Juno Lee
