= Brendon Small =

American actor, comedian, writer, and musician (born 1975)

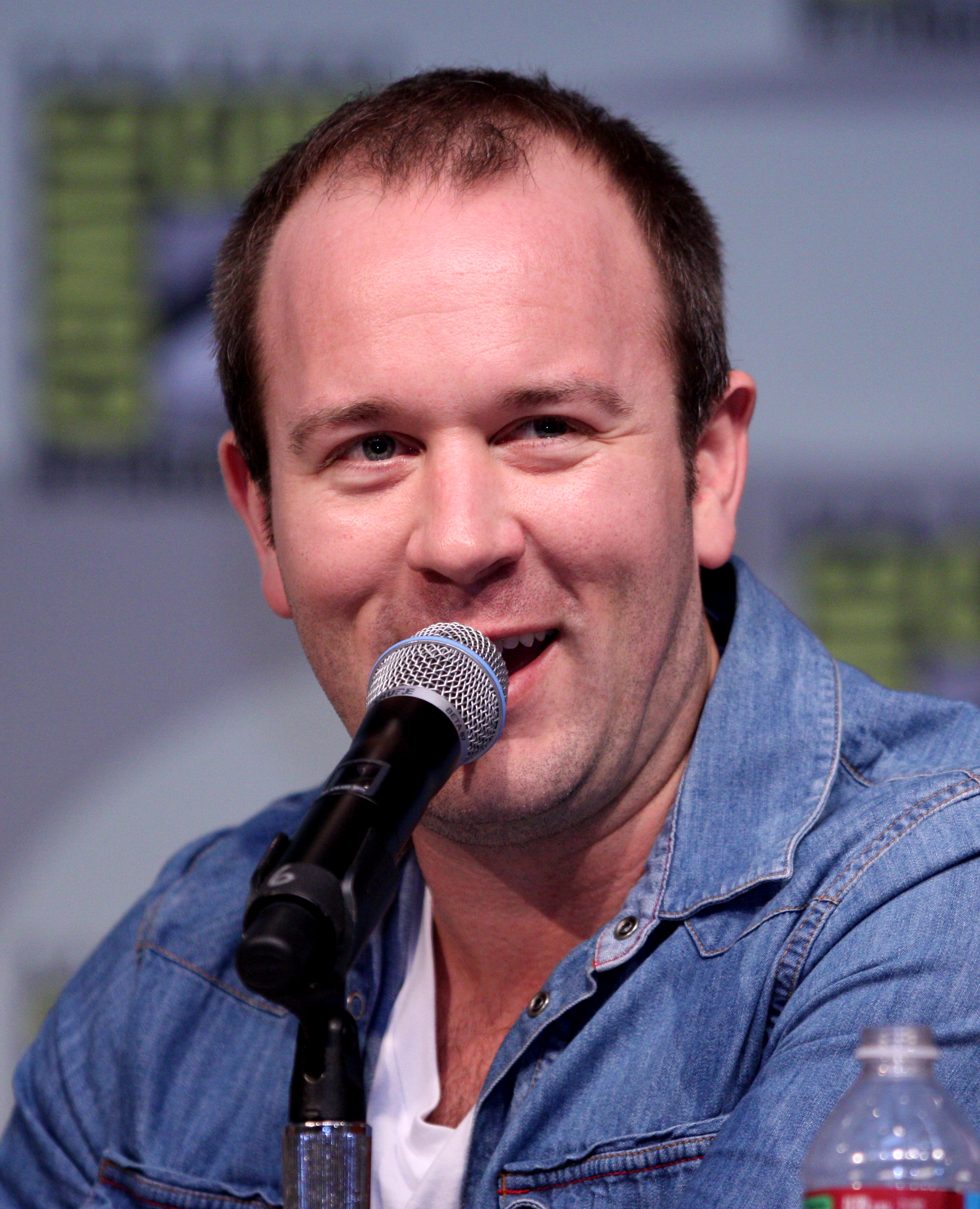
- Brendon Small in July 2010
- Born: February 15, 1975 (age 51); Springfield, Illinois, U.S.
- Other names: Donald Cock (occasional stage name); Captain Mustache (stage character)
- Occupations: Actor; stand-up comedian; musician; writer; producer
- Years active: 1997–present
- Notable work: Home Movies; Metalocalypse; Dethklok; Galaktikon 1 & 2

Comedy career
- Medium: Improvisational comedy; observational comedy; character comedy; satire; slapstick
- Subjects: Everyday life; manners; social norms; mass media; popular culture
- Musical career
- Genres: Melodic death metal; comedy rock; heavy metal; hard rock; rock
- Instruments: Vocals; guitar; bass; keyboards; drum programming
- Website: brendonsmall.com

Brendon Small (born February 15, 1975) is an American actor, stand-up comedian, writer, director, producer, and musician who is known for co-creating the animated series Home Movies (1999–2004, with Loren Bouchard) and Metalocalypse (2006–2013, with Tommy Blacha). He also writes the music, and is the main performer for the fictional melodic death metal band Dethklok, which began as the subject of Metalocalypse but has taken on a life of its own, with four albums and an occasional live touring band, headed by Small. Small has also released two albums under his own name, in a similar musical style to Dethklok.

== Early life and education ==
Small was born in Illinois in 1975. He moved to California as a child. Small started learning guitar at the age of 14 after a kid in his neighborhood began teaching him about guitar and music. At his first public performance, his hands shook so wildly that he had trouble controlling the guitar. It would be another ten years before he was comfortable performing in public. He graduated from Palma High School in Salinas, California. He graduated from Berklee College of Music in 1997. During his music studies, he took several writing and comedy classes at Emerson College. After graduating, he felt that the rock music genre was fading in popularity, so decided to try his hand at stand-up comedy.

== Career ==
=== Media ===
Small was performing stand up at The Comedy Studio in Harvard Square when he was spotted by Loren Bouchard, who at the time was casting for the central character for a UPN pilot produced by Tom Snyder Productions, which eventually evolved into Home Movies. Small and Bouchard co-created Home Movies, an animated series that initially aired on the UPN television network which moved to Cartoon Network's Adult Swim block. The series ran for four seasons from 1999 to 2004. Small was one of the show's writers, while Bouchard served as the director. In the series, he voiced the show's protagonist, eight-year-old aspiring filmmaker Brendon Small, as well as a number of other characters. Small composed the show's theme music, as well as writing and performing numerous other songs for the show's soundtrack.

Small lent his voice to a number of other animated shows. He co-starred as Chad in the BET animated sitcom, Hey Monie!, and has voiced many supporting characters in The Venture Bros., including that show's shell shocked and drug-addicted version of Jonny Quest. Small has had cameo roles in Aqua Teen Hunger Force, Squidbillies, Reno 911! and Frisky Dingo. Small, along with Scott Adsit, appeared as lead characters of the Adult Swim pilot Let's Fish; the show's pilot premiered on May 13, 2007, but the series was not picked up.

In April 2005, the Sci Fi Channel announced an upcoming debut of a half-hour animated ensemble comedy show created by Small titled Barbarian Chronicles. The show, which has not aired, was said to be produced by Small and Worldwide Pants Incorporated. Small has said that there are no plans to air the show but that anything can happen in the future.

Small posed for a pictorial that appeared in the April 2006 issue of Playgirl magazine, as part of a humor-themed issue. Small posed naked holding a medieval flail and a strategically placed metal shield that hid his genitals.

Small served as co-producer, co-writer and composer for the Adult Swim animated series Metalocalypse, which ran for four seasons from 2006 to 2012, along with a 2013 special, Metalocalypse: The Doomstar Requiem. The series focused on a fictional melodic death metal band named Dethklok, and each episode features a song performed by the band. In addition to writing, directing and executive producing the series, he also provided voice talent for the characters Skwisgaar Skwigelf, Pickles, and Nathan Explosion, three of the five members of Dethklok. Small has stated that while animation is his dream job, he does not really like watching animation that much.

In 2007 and 2009, Small hosted the annual Guitar Superstar competition; in 2008, he was one of the judges.

In 2010, Small directed Soundgarden's music video for "Black Rain", and The Damned Things' music video for "We've Got a Situation Here".

Small's virtual band Dethklok appeared, via video, at the 2009 Golden Gods Awards. The band received the award for Best International Band. At the 2010 Golden Gods Awards, Small attended and performed with Brian Posehn's band and introduced Fear Factory's set. At the 2011 Golden Gods Awards, Small attended and introduced DevilDriver's set. Small attended the 2012 Golden Gods Awards and introduced Trivium's set. He was nominated for best guitarist at the 2013 Golden Gods Awards but did not win.

In May 2014, Small wrote a column for Premier Guitar regarding his guitar techniques.

Small appeared on Ken Reid's TV Guidance Counselor Podcast on May 15, 2015, as part of the Bridgetown Comedy Festival in Portland, Oregon.

=== Comedy ===
Small has frequently performed stand-up comedy, first in Boston, before moving to the Los Angeles area, where he performs now. Small was one of the hosts (along with Ron Lynch and Craig Anton) of The Tomorrow Show, a live weekly musical and comedic variety show; in his off-time, Small still occasionally appears as a guest. One of his prominent forms of stand-up is character comedy, where he acts out a character he created. Some of the characters he has played are Captain Moustache, Victor Diamond, Tiny and Bernie Fretts, all of which he has performed as in the comedy podcast Comedy Bang! Bang!. In recent years, Small's time has become booked from his music and television career, but he still occasionally performs stand-up at venues such as The Steve Allen Theater, The Ice House and The Baked Potato. Small credits Monty Python, Albert Brooks, Woody Allen and the Marx Brothers as his biggest comedy influences.

=== Music career ===
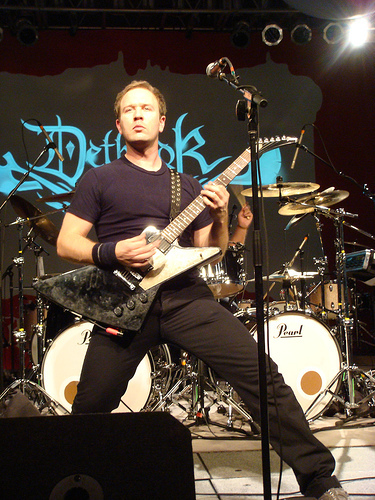
Small performing live with Dethklok

Small wrote all the music for the show Home Movies, and released all the songs he had written for the show on the Home Movies: Bonus CD. The CD was included with purchase of the Season 4 DVD box set.

He wrote all the music for Metalocalypse. In September 2007, he completed work on the first Dethklok album, The Dethalbum, on which he collaborated with Gene Hoglan to deliver an authentic melodic death metal sound while simultaneously retaining the light-hearted nature with which Small portrays the heavy metal genre. The album debuted at No. 21 on the Billboard 200, making it the highest-ranked death metal album on the Billboard at the time.

In November 2007, Small, Hoglan, Mike Keneally and Bryan Beller performed live as Dethklok at twelve US college campuses in support of The Dethalbum. The Adult Swim-sponsored "Dethtour" featured Dethklok supporting indie rock band ...And You Will Know Us by the Trail of Dead. The quartet reunited in 2008 to headline a longer "Dethtour", where they toured the US in June and early July with fellow metal bands Chimaira and Soilent Green. During the tour they released the ...And You Will Know Us by the Trail of Dead/Dethklok split EP for free at the concerts.

The second Dethklok album, Dethalbum II, was released on September 29, 2009. Dethalbum II reached No. 15 on the Billboard 200, making it the highest charting death metal album in history, beating the first Dethalbum. A tour in support of the new album began in late 2009, where Dethklok co-headlined with the band Mastodon.

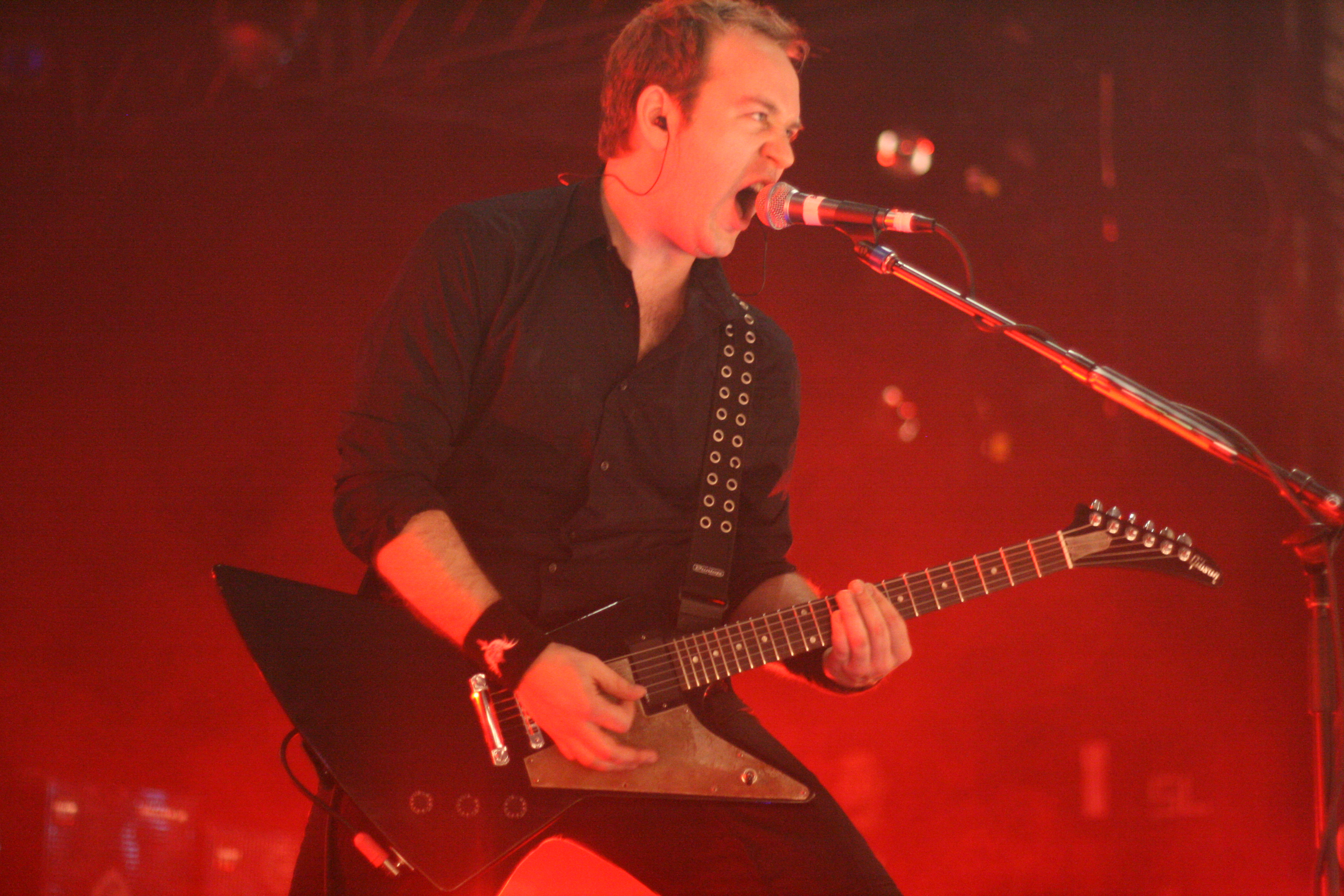
Small in concert in 2008

Small performed guest vocals as Nathan Explosion on the Zimmers Hole song "The Vowel Song". Small contributed guitar work to the songs "Devils Teeth" from Exodus's album Exhibit B: The Human Condition, as well as "More Metal Than You" from comedian Brian Posehn's album Fart and Wiener Jokes. Small created the "Murder Mix" of the song "Liar" by Emilie Autumn from the Liar/Dead Is the New Alive EP. Small performed the solo for the song "Get It Up" (Van Halen cover) on Sylencers' debut album A Lethal Dose of Truth. Small performs a guitar solo on the song "Let's Make Out" on the Sex Slaves album Call of the Wild.

In early 2011, Small introduced the Dethklok "Thunderhorse" Explorer from Gibson, a guitar made to his own specifications, and modeled after Skwisgaar's Gibson Explorer. A limited edition Epiphone "Thunderhorse" Explorer, based on the Gibson "Thunderhorse" Explorer, was introduced in early 2013. In May 2012, Small introduced the prototype for the Gibson Flying V "Snow Falcon", built to his own specifications, and modeled after Toki Wartooth's Gibson Flying V. The final version of the guitar was released on December 13, 2013.

In April 2012, Small released his debut solo album, Brendon Small's Galaktikon. The album featured Dethklok members Beller on bass and Hoglan on drums. Small described the album as a "high-stakes, intergalactic, extreme rock album" and described it as being similar to Dethklok but with more melodic vocals and rock elements. Small performed songs from Brendon Small's Galaktikon for the first time at "WesFest 8" on March 3, 2013, in West Hollywood, California.

On April 29, 2012, Small started a weekly guitar lesson video series on the Adult Swim YouTube channel, entitled "Shreducation", which consisted of 12 installments.

Small, Beller and Hoglan got together to work on the third Dethklok album, Dethalbum III, which was released on October 16, 2012. Small released a fourth Dethklok album, entitled The Doomstar Requiem, on October 29, 2013, which is a soundtrack album to the Metalocalypse special of the same name. The album featured Hoglan on drums, Beller performing guest bass on a track, and Mike Keneally performing guest vocals.

Small released his second album, Brendon Small's Galaktikon II, in 2017.

In 2021, Small released a new instrumental song, "Ghosthorse," to promote his new Epiphone signature model guitar, the GhostHorse Explorer.

== BS Records ==
In 2012, Small self-released his solo album, Brendon Small's Galaktikon, independently on his personal record label BS Records. He funded the album himself, and used all of the profits he received from the album to fund future projects. In 2013, as there was no demand from Cartoon Network's Williams Street Records for another Dethklok album, Small released the fourth Dethklok album, The Doomstar Requiem (the soundtrack to the TV special of the same name), on BS Records instead. He stated at the time that he wanted to keep Dethklok's music going regardless of whether it would be financially beneficial to him.

== Personal life ==
Small is of Lithuanian descent. He married interior designer Courtney Bates in 2014.

As of 2009, Small resides in Los Angeles. He had a dog named Ernie (a Weimaraner) that died in January 2014. He has since gotten a new dog named Gilda, also a Weimaraner.

== Filmography ==
=== Film and television ===
Year	Title	Role	Notes
1999–2004	Home Movies	Brendon Small; Duane; Perry; Junior Adelberg; Ken Adelberg; Various characters	•Creator •Writer •Producer •Voice actor •Composer •Animated series
2000	New Apartment	New Tenant	•Actor •Short film
2003	Hey Monie!	Chad	•Voice actor •Animated series
2004	Reno 911!	Priest	•Actor •Episodes: "Raineesha X", "Not Without My Mustache" •Composer •TV series
2004	Last Laugh '04	Red Sox fan	•Actor •TV movie
2004–2007	Perfect Hair Forever	—N/a	•Composed theme music
2005	Lucy, The Daughter of the Devil	Classmate	•Voice actor •Episode: "He's Not the Messiah, He's a DJ" •Composed the song "Maneater" •Animated series •Uncredited
2005–2012	Squidbillies	Dr. Jerry; Devil	•Voice actor (2 episodes) •Episodes: "Family Trouble" (voice actor), "Mephistopheles Traveled Below to a Southern State Whose Motto Is 'Wisdom, Justice, and Moderation'" (composer and voice actor) •Animated series •Composer (1 episode) •Credited as Donald Cock
2006–2018	The Venture Bros.	Action Johnny; Plastic Surgeon; Hector; Swifty; Agent Hauser; Sgt. Hatred; Various Characters	•Voice actor (12 episodes) •Animated series
2006–2013	Metalocalypse	Nathan Explosion; Pickles; Skwisgaar Skwigelf; Charles Foster Offdensen; Various characters	•Creator •Executive producer •Writer •Director •Voice actor •Composer •Animated series
2006	Frisky Dingo	Brent & Trent	•Voice actor •Episode: "Meet Killface" •Animated series •Credited as Donald Cock
2006–2010	Aqua Teen Hunger Force	Dr. Wongburger	•Voice actor •3 Episodes •Animated series •Credited as Donald Cock and The-Creature-from-Plaque-Lagoon
2007	Let's Fish	Kevin	•Actor •Executive producer •TV pilot
2010	Last Call with Carson Daly	Himself	•Air date: October 5, 2010
2011–2014	Bob's Burgers	Animal Control Guy	•Voice actor (2 episodes) •Episodes: "Sacred Cow", "Dawn of the Peck" •Animated series
2011	Jon Benjamin Has a Van	Musician	•Episode: "Smoking" •Composed the song "Christ Pipe" •Composed the theme music •TV series
2012–2013	Motorcity	—N/a	•Composer
2013	Law of the Land	Guy Fellow	•TV series •Actor (5 episodes)
2013	All Growz Up with Melinda Hill	Himself	•Web series
2013	Morgan Ågren's Conundrum: A Percussive Misadventure	Himself	•Documentary
2013	Metalocalypse: The Doomstar Requiem	Nathan Explosion; Pickles; Skwisgaar Skwigelf; Charles Foster Offdensen; Various characters	•Creator •Producer •Writer •Voice actor •Composer
2013	'tallica Parking Lot	Nathan Explosion	•Voice only •Animated short •Premiered at Fantastic Fest
2014	WordGirl	Chazz	•Voice actor •Episode: "A Questionable Pair/All That Chazz" •Animated series
2014–2017	Black Sails	Pirate	•Voice only •Featured in the opening theme •TV series
2014	Getting Doug with High	Himself	•Web series
2014	Turbo FAST	Clip/Clap	•Voice actor (2 episodes) •Animated series
2015	Love in Moreno Valley	Pastor Mitchell	•Actor
2015	Comedy Bang! Bang!	Victor Diamond	•Actor (1 episode)
2015	The Playboy Morning Show	Himself	•Talk show
2015	Breadwinners	—N/a	•Composed the song "Wolf Head Bread"
2016	Hidden America with Jonah Ray	Captain Mustache	•Episode: "Boston: Where Past is Present"
2016	Little Big Awesome	Pointy Thing	•Animated TV movie
2016	The Meltdown with Jonah and Kumail	Himself	•Episode: "The One With The Box of Pain"
2016	Nerdland	Mr. Kelly	•Voice actor •Animated film
2018	Clarence	Video Store Clerk	•Voice actor, character based on Brendon in Home Movies •Episode: "Video Store"
2023	Metalocalypse: Army of the Doomstar	Nathan Explosion; Skwisgaar Skwigelf; Pickles; Charles Offdensen; Edgar Jomfru; Dick Knubbler	•Director •Producer •Writer •Voice actor •Composer
2026	Robot Chicken Adult Swim Special	Nathan Explosion; Pickles; Skwisgaar Skwigelf	•Voice actor, Television special

=== Music videos ===
Year	Artist	Song	Notes
2007	Dethklok	"Bloodrocuted"	Co-director (with Jon Schnepp)
2010	Soundgarden	"Black Rain"	Director
2010	The Damned Things	"We've Got a Situation Here"	Director
2016	Anthrax	"Blood Eagle Wings"	Actor
2018	Nekrogoblikon	"Dressed As Goblins"	Director

=== Pinball machines ===
Year	Game	Role	Notes
2013	Metallica	"Sparky" and "The Snake"	
2017	Aerosmith	Jacky in the Box	
2019	Black Knight: Sword of Rage	Composer & performer	
2023	Foo Fighters	Overlord	
2025	Dungeons & Dragons: The Tyrant's Eye		

=== Podcasts ===
Year	Podcast	Role	Notes
2009–2019	Comedy Bang! Bang!	Himself; Captain Moustache; Bernie Fretts; Victor Diamond; Tiny; Willard "Willy" Mapleton	•Comedy podcast •Episodes: #32, #256, #260, #294, #301, #320, #326, #343, #357, #373, #418, #434, #451, #463, #498, #517, #599.5
2013	Rafflecast	Himself	•Episode: #26
2014	Sklarboro Country	Himself	•Episodes: #227
2014	Truth & Iliza	Himself	•Episode: #16
2015	TV Guidance Counselor Podcast	Himself	
2015	With Special Guest Lauren Lapkus	Adalwolf Ditmar	•Episodes: #30
2015	Nerd Poker	Himself	•Episodes: #145, #147, #148
2015	Pointless	Himself	•Episodes: #97, #132
2015	The Bone Zone	Himself	•Episodes: #194
2017	Fitzdog Radio	Himself	•Episodes: #614

== Discography ==
=== Solo ===
- 2012: Brendon Small's Galaktikon
- 2017: Brendon Small's Galaktikon II: Become the Storm
- 2021: "Ghosthorse" (Single)

=== Dethklok ===
- 2007: The Dethalbum
- 2007: Adult Swim Presents: ...And You Will Know Us by the Trail of Dead on Tour with Dethklok (split album with ...And You Will Know Us by the Trail of Dead)
- 2009: Dethalbum II
- 2012: Dethalbum III
- 2013: The Doomstar Requiem
- 2023: Dethalbum IV

=== Soundtrack ===
- 2004: Songs Brendon's Not Allowed to Name (also known as "web") – Free online download previously available on Small's website, comprising 15 songs from Home Movies and an early version of the Metalocalypse theme song
- 2006: Home Movies: Bonus CD (released with the Home Movies Season 4 Boxset)
- 2006: Saw III soundtrack (European version) (featured Dethklok song "Hatredcopter"; credited as Brendon Small)
- 2014: Bear McCreary – Knights of Badassdom – Original Motion Picture Soundtrack (guitar work on "Your Heart Sucks My Soul")

=== Video games ===
- 2006: Guitar Hero II (Dethklok – "Thunderhorse")
- 2009: Brütal Legend (Dethklok – "Murmaider")
- 2010: Guitar Hero 5 "Metal Track Pack" DLC (Dethklok – "Laser Cannon Deth Sentence")
- 2010: Guitar Hero: Warriors of Rock (Dethklok – "Bloodlines")
- 2011: Saints Row: The Third ("Adult Swim" radio station; Dethklok – "The Cyborg Slayers")
- 2015: Rocksmith 2014 "Dethklok 3-Song Pack" DLC (Dethklok – "Thunderhorse", "Awaken", "Go Into the Water")

=== Guest work ===
- 2007: Emilie Autumn – Liar/Dead Is the New Alive ("Murder Mix" of the song "Liar")
- 2008: Zimmers Hole – When You Were Shouting at the Devil... We Were in League with Satan (guest vocals on "The Vowel Song" as Nathan Explosion) (Dethklok)
- 2010: Brian Posehn – Fart and Wiener Jokes (guitar work on "More Metal Than You")
- 2010: Exodus – Exhibit B: The Human Condition (guitar solo on "Devils Teeth")
- 2012: Sex Slaves – Call of the Wild (guitar solo on "Let's Make Out")
- 2012: Sylencer – A Lethal Dose of Truth (guitar solo on "Get It Up") (Van Halen cover)
- 2014: Flying Lotus – You're Dead! (guitar work on "Turkey Dog Coma" and "Siren Song")
- 2014: Romantic Rebel – Romantic Rebel (guitar work on "Lie")
- 2014: The Levinson Bros & Rob Kutner – "The Season of ForGiftNess" (guest vocals and guitar solo)
- 2015: The Aristocrats – Tres Caballeros (guest vocals on "Smuggler's Corridor")
- 2020: Posehn – Grandpa Metal (guitar solo on "Goblin Love")

=== Collaborations and other appearances ===
- 2005: They Might Be Giants – Venue Songs DVD/CD (co-writer of "Taste the Fame")
- 2014: Nashville Pussy – Up The Dosage (writer of "Takin' it Easy")
