= ABCs of Death (film series) =

American comedy horror anthology film series

- Official film series logo
- Based on: Original story by Ant Timpson
- Distributed by: Magnet Releasing (1–3); Vimeo (3); FilmBuff Distribution Co. (3)
- Country: United States
- Language: English
- Budget: $260,000 (Total of 2 films)
- Box office: $42,307 (Total of 2 films)

ABCs of Death is a series of American-produced multilingual comedy horror anthology films created in independent filmmaking collaboration with various countries; including two limited theatrical releases, and one straight-to-consumer video on demand spin-off film.

Created from an original story concept by producer Ant Timpson, the plot centers around a variety of anthological explorations of horror and death. Through the series, writers and directors create a segment centered around one of the letters of the alphabet, with the studios allowing creative freedom to each of the filmmakers once they were assigned their segment (including which word they chose to explore with their given letter). The resulting film series includes a diversity in cultures, languages, content, and subgenres within the horror genre.

The film series as a whole has been met with a variety of classifications from film critics; the original film was met with mixed critical reception, while the second installment was more well received overall. The third released movie was similarly met with mixed reception from critics, though it was acknowledged as fitting the praiseworthy aspects of the previous two films. Though the box office numbers for the series were not considered as well as expected, Timpson later stated that the series had made enough monetary income through video on demand to justify continuing to develop additional installments.

== Films ==
=== The ABCs of Death (2012) ===
Released as an anthology film, featuring segments depicting various subgenres of horror that were directed by twenty-six of what the studio described as "the world's leading talents" in contemporary indie-filmmaking. With a premise inspired by ABC educational children's books, the movie is made up of twenty-six individual segments directed by a different director, who was assigned a specific letter of the alphabet; and given the task do develop a story and film a short that explores a death associated with that letter of the alphabet. The studio allowed each director creative freedom in choosing the word, and developing the segment around their choice. The result includes provocative, shocking, and comedic exploration of the reality of death. The film depicts the range of diversity within the modern horror movie genre.

Fangoria described the product as: "a stunning roll call of some of the most exciting names in horror across the world." Producer Ant Timpson later stated that the movie made a significant amount of income from video on demand (VOD) means, though he nor the studios would reveal those financial figures.

Concept by Ant Timpson. U.S. release date March 8, 2013

Segment	Director(s)	Screenwriter(s)	Story by	Producers
Title Sequence(s)	Aaron Becker	Ant Timpson		Ant Timpson and Tim League
A is for Apocalypse	Nacho Vigalondo	Gorka Cornejo	Nacho Vigalondo	Ant Timpson, Tim League, Nahikari Ipiña and Nacho Vigalando
B is for Bigfoot	Adrián García Bogliano			Ant Timpson, Tim League and Andrea Quiroz Hernández
C is for Cycle	Ernesto Díaz Espinoza	Haroldo Muñoz and Ernesto Díaz Espinoza	Ernesto Díaz Espinoza	Ant Timpson, Tim League and Marlene Vargas Brebes
D is for Dogfight	Marcel Sarmiento			Ant Timpson, Tim League and Douglas Nabors
E is for Exterminate	Angela Bettis		Brent Hanley	Ant Timpson, Tim League, Angela Bettis and Jammes Luckett
F is for Fart	Noboru Iguchi			Ant Timpson, Tim League, Marc Walkow and Yoshihiro Nishimura
G is for Gravity	Andrew Traucki			Ant Timpson, Tim League and Andrew Traucki
H is for Hydro-Electric Diffusion	Thomas Cappelen Malling	Kenneth Olaf Hjellum and Thomas Cappelen Malling	Thomas Cappelen Malling	Ant Timpson, Tim League and Hugo Hagemann Fosker
I is for Ingrown	Jorge Michel Grau		Martha Poly R. Mendivil & Jorge Michel Grau	Ant Timpson, Tim League and Mayra Espinosa Castro
J is for Jidai-geki (Samurai Movie)	Yūdai Yamaguchi			Ant Timpson, Tim League, Marc Walkow and Yoshihiro Nishimura
K is for Klutz	Anders Morgenthaler	Anders Morgenthaler		Ant Timpson, Tim League, Sine Birkegaard Pedersen
K is for Klutz	Director of Animation: Stine Marie Buhl	Anders Morgenthaler		Ant Timpson, Tim League, Sine Birkegaard Pedersen
L is for Libido	Timo Tjahjanto			Ant Timpson, Tim League, Novialita Fa and Dicky Fa
M is for Miscarriage	Ti West			Ant Timpson, Tim League, Peter Phok and Ti West
N is for Nuptials	Banjong Pisanthanakun	Banjong Pisanthanakun & Nontra Khumvong		Ant Timpson and Tim League
O is for Orgasm	Hélène Cattet & Bruno Forzani			Ant Timpson and Tim League
P is for Pressure	Simon Rumley			Ant Timpson, Tim League, Simon Rumley and Milton Kam
Q is for Quack	Adam Wingard	Simon Barrett	Keith Calder	Ant Timpson, Tim League and Lino Stavole
R is for Removed	Srđan Spasojević	Dimitrije Vojnov & Srđan Spasojević and Marija Stanosević		Ant Timpson, Tim League, Srđan Spasojević and Dragana Jovanović
S is for Speed	Jake West			Ant Timpson, Tim League, Francis O'Toole, Simon Boswell and Jake West
T is for Toilet	Lee Hardcastle			Ant Timpson, Tim League and Lee Hardcastle
U is for Unearthed	Ben Wheatley	Ben Wheatley & Andy Starke		Ant Timpson, Tim League, Claire Jones and Andy Starke
V is for Vagitus (The Cry of a Newborn Baby)	Kaare Andrews			Ant Timpson, Tim League and Chris Ferguson
W is for WTF!	Jon Schnepp			Ant Timpson, Tim League and Jon Schnepp
X is for XXL	Xavier Gens			Ant Timpson, Tim League, Michel Teicher, Camila Mendez and Esmeralda Leo
Y is for Youngbuck	Jason Eisener			Ant Timpson, Tim League and Robert Cotterill
Z is for Zetsumetsu (Extinction)	Yoshihiro Nishimura			Ant Timpson, Tim League, Marc Walkow and Yoshihiro Nishimura

=== ABCs of Death 2 (2014) ===
Following the financial success of the first installment, the producers created another feature-length anthology film which includes twenty-six more segments depicting various horrific deaths. Inspired alongside the rest of the film series by the "ABC's" in children's literature, each filmmaker was assigned a letter of the alphabet and given creative control over the story and creation of the associated short. The studio once again touted "over two dozen of the world's leading talents in contemporary genre film", with the announcement of the project. Each segment explores a different aspect of death, through a variety of subgenres of horror through the styles of independent filmmaking.

Though the movie was met with much more critical praise than the first installment, the film suffered greatly financially due to the illegal pirating. Producer Ant Timpson would state in later years that the movie made enough income through VOD figures, to continue the film series.

Concept by Ant Timpson. U.S. release date January 1, 2017

Segment	Director(s)	Screenwriter(s)	Story by	Producers
Title Sequence	Wolfgang Matzl	Ant Timpson		Ant Timpson and Tim League
A is for Amateur	E. L. Katz	David Chirchirillo and Rachel Lamb	David Chirchirillo	Ant Timpson, Tim League, Peter Katz, Don Le and Bobbi Sue Luther
B is for Badger	Julian Barratt			Ant Timpson, Tim League and Andy Starke
C is for Capital Punishment	Julian Gilbey			Ant Timpson, Tim League, Matthew Hobbs and Julian Gilbey
D is for Deloused	Robert Morgan			Ant Timpson and Tim League
E is for Equilibrium	Alejandro Brugués		Marc Walkow & Alejandro Brugués	Ant Timpson, Tim League and Asori Soto
F is for Falling	Aharon Keshales & Navot Papushado	Limor Shmila		Ant Timpson, Tim League and Nadav Shlomo Giladi
G is for Grandad	Jim Hosking	Jim Hosking & Toby Harvard		Ant Timpson, Tim League and Andy Starke
H is for Head Games	Bill Plympton			Ant Timpson, Tim League and Bill Plympton
I is for Invincible	Erik Matti			Ant Timpson, Tim League and Relyn Tan
J is for Jesus	Dennison Ramalho		Jeff Bühler	Ant Timpson, Tim League, Rodrigo Castellar and Pablo Torrecillas
K is for Knell	Kristina Buožytė & Bruno Samper	Kristina Buožytė & Bruno Samper and Darius Silenas	Kristina Buožytė & Bruno Samper	Ant Timpson, Tim League, Vitalijus Žukas, Jurga Jutaitė, Gabija Siurbytė, Kristina Buožytė and Burno Samper
L is for Legacy	Lancelot Oduwa Imasuen	Ossa Earlice and B.B.C. Nwanchineke	Lancelot Oduwa Imasuen	Ant Timpson, Tim League and Lancelot Oduwa Imasuen
M is for Masticate	Robert Boocheck			Ant Timpson, Tim League, Wade Harpptlian, Robert Boocheck and Andrew Gilson
N is for Nexus	Larry Fessenden			Ant Timpson, Tim League and Jenn Wexler
O is for Ochlocracy (Mob Rule)	Hajime Ohata			Ant Timpson, Tim League and Mai Nakanishi
P is for P-P-P-P SCARY!	Todd Rohal			Ant Timpson, Tim League, Clay Liford and Zack Carlson
Q is for Questionnaire	Rodney Ascher			Ant Timpson, Tim League and Tim Kirk
R is for Roulette	Marvin Kren	Benjamin Hessler		Ant Timpson, Tim League and Pia Sophie Abazovic
S is for Split	Juan Martínez Moreno			Ant Timpson, Tim League and Ben Jacques
T is for Torture Porn	Jen Soska & Sylvia Soska			Ant Timpson, Tim League, Jen Soska and Sylvia Soska
U is for Utopia	Vincenzo Natali	Vincenzo Natali and Candice Gregoris	Vincenzo Natali	Ant Timpson, Tim League and Peter Mabrucco
V is for Vacation	Jerome Sable	Jerome Sable & Nicholas Musurca		Ant Timpson, Tim League, Jerome Sable and Nicholas Musurca
W is for Wish	Steven Kostanski	Jeremy Gillespie		Ant Timpson, Tim League and Steven Kostanski
X is for Xylophone	Julien Maury & Alexandre Bustillo			Ant Timpson and Tim League
Y is for Youth	Soichi Umezawa			Ant Timpson, Tim League, Mai Nakanishi and Soichi Umezawa
Z is for Zygote	Chris Nash			Ant Timpson, Tim League, Peter Kuplowsky and Shannon Rae Hanmer

=== ABC's of Death 2½ (2016) ===
In July 2016, it was announced that another installment in the film series would be released. Described as a spin-off from the previous two entries, the project would explore the 26 best submissions out of 541 that the studio had received from independent filmmakers for ABCs of Death 2. For the first two movies, the associated studios held competitions for fans to submit their own creations, to be featured in the film series. In 2012, the featured selection was "T is for Toilet", while "M is for Masticate" was released in 2014. For the new spin-off movie, the producers decided to compile their selection of the top twenty-six submitted shorts for the featured letter "M" segment, of the second movie. Executive producer, Ant Timpson stated: "These are who we think are the next filmmakers to break out...That [was] the goal of the competition."

ABC's of Death 2½ was described as separate from a planned third installment, and critics described the result as a mixed bag of product created by runners-up of the prior competition. The variety of segments once again explore various genres and styles of horror, all centered around a designated letter of the alphabet. Independent filmmakers created the stories and shorts with creative freedom, choosing the word that starts with the letter "M" associated with death, that they wanted the segment to center around. Ant Timpson and Tim League who served as producers on the first two feature films, served as executive producers for this straight-to-consumer release. Though the series continued to fare better critically by its second installment, it suffered a monetary loss due to the large amount of pirated viewings it received. As a response to this, Drafthouse Films chose to release 2½ through Vimeo where it could be rented for $2.99 or purchased at $5.99 total. Timpson would also clarify that the first two movies were financially successful through VOD means, and was a factor in their decision to release the spin-off in a similar fashion; albeit the revenue earned through the release, would see Drafthouse split the income with Vimeo.

Concept by Ant Timpson. U.S. release date October 31, 2017

Segment	Director(s)	Screenwriter(s)	Story by	Producers
M is for Magnetic Tape	Tim Rutherford & Cody Kennedy	Tim Rutherford, Kevin Martin & Cody Kennedy		Ted Geoghegan, Tim Rutherford and Cody Kennedy
M is for Maieusiophobia (The Fear of Giving Birth)	Christopher Younes			Ted Geoghegan and Christopher Younes
M is for Mailbox	Dante Vescio & Rodrigo Gasparini	Dante Vescio, Rafael Baliú & Rodrigo Gasparini		Ted Geoghegan, Dante Vescio and Rodrigo Gasparini
M is for Make Believe	Summer Johnson			Ted Geoghegan and Summer Johnson
M is for Malnutrition	Peter Czikrai			Ted Geoghegan, Peter Czikrai and Andrej Doleźal
M is for Manure	Michael Schwartz	Jay Clarke & Michael Schwartz		Ted Geoghegan, Jason Baskey and Michael Schwartz
M is for Marauder	Steve Daniels			Ted Geoghegan and Steve Daniels
M is for Mariachi	Eric Pennycoff			Ted Geoghegan and Ricardo Lorenzo
M is for Marriage	Todd E. Freeman			Ted Geoghegan, Christian Burgess, Devon Lyon, Kevin Curry, Todd E. Freeman and Lara Cuddy
M is for Martyr	Jeff Stewart			Ted Geoghegan and C.B. Kaczor
M is for Matador	Gigi Saul Guerrero	Shane McKenzie	Gigi Saul Guerrero & Luke Bramley	Ted Geoghegan and Raynor Shima
M is for Meat	Wolfgang Matzl			Ted Geoghegan and Wolfgang Matzl
M is for Mermaid	Ama Lea	Robert G. Phelps		Ted Geoghegan, Emma Jacobs and Ama Lea
M is for Merry Christmas	Joe Stas & Lloyd Stas	Joe Stas & Lloyd Stas and Tom Stas		Ted Geoghegan, Joe Stas and Lloyd Stas
M is for Mess	Carlos Faria			Ted Geoghegan and Carlos Faria
M is for Messiah	Nicholas Humphries	Bob Woolsey		Ted Geoghegan, Lindsey Mann and Darren Borrowman
M is for Mind Meld	BC Glassberg	BC Glassberg and Bridget Green	BC Glassberg	Ted Geoghegan and Jimmie Parker
M is for Miracle	Álvaro Núñez			Ted Geoghegan and Sonia Álvarez
M is for Mobile	Barış Erdoğan			Ted Geoghegan and Ozan Özkırmızı
M is for Mom	Carles Torrens			Ted Geoghegan and Rich Salamone
M is for Moonstruck	Travis Betz			Ted Geoghegan and Travis Betz
M is for Mormon Missionaries	Peter Podgursky			Ted Geoghegan and Jacob Brumfield
M is for Mother	Ryan Bosworth	Ryan Bosworth & Jennifer Bosworth		Ted Geoghegan, Ryan Bosworth and Jennifer Bosworth
M is for Muff	Mia’Kate Russel			Ted Geoghegan and Justin Dix
M is for Munging	Jason Koch & Clint Kelly			Ted Geoghegan, Jason Kock and Clint Kelly
M is for Mutant	Stuart Simpson			Ted Geoghegan and Fabian Pisani

=== Potential sequel ===
During the final clip of the end credits to ABCs of Death 2, a teaser statement for a third installment read as: "ABCs of Death 3: Teach Harder, coming 2016". Despite the successes of the previous two movies, producer Ant Timpson stated in March 2015 that the box office performance of the second film was affected dramatically by pirated viewings. At that time, the producer stated that he and Tim League were looking at the financial figures, and will approach Magnolia Pictures to continue working on the project. In August of the same year, producers Ant Timpson and Time League posted on the official social media page of the franchise, requesting suggestions for directors that fans would like to see create segments of the upcoming project; while confirming that they would once again include a segment created by an amateur filmmaker, submitted through a contest.

When ABC's of Death 2½ was released in 2016 it was described as a spin-off, while the introductory statement of the film clarifies that it "is not the ABCs of Death 3", indicating that the third movie was still in development at that time.

== Additional crew and production details ==
Film	Segment	Crew/Detail					
Film	Segment	Composer(s)	Cinematographer(s)	Editor(s)	Production companies	Distributing companies	Running time
The ABCs of Death	Title Sequence(s)	Aaron Becker	Aaron Becker	Aaron Becker	Drafthouse Films, Timpson Films, Magnolia Pictures	Magnet Releasing	2 hrs 4 mins
The ABCs of Death	A is for Apocalypse	Roberto Fernandez	Jon D. Dominguez	Jon D. Dominguez	Drafthouse Films, Timpson Films, Magnolia Pictures	Magnet Releasing	2 hrs 4 mins
The ABCs of Death	B is for Bigfoot	Julio Pillado	Ernesto Herrera	Adrián García Bogliano	Drafthouse Films, Timpson Films, Magnolia Pictures, Salto De Fe Films, Morbido Films	Magnet Releasing	2 hrs 4 mins
The ABCs of Death	C is for Cycle	Rocco	Nicolás Ibieta	Ernesto Díaz Espinoza	Drafthouse Films, Timpson Films, Magnolia Pictures, CBRA Films	Magnet Releasing	2 hrs 4 mins
The ABCs of Death	D is for Dogfight	Phillip Blackford	Harris Charalambous	Phillip Blackford	Drafthouse Films, Timpson Films, Magnolia Pictures, Radiant Images Studio, Ironlight Studios, Killer Grip Studios	Magnet Releasing	2 hrs 4 mins
The ABCs of Death	E is for Exterminate	Jammes Luckett	Kevin Ford	Chepo Peña	Drafthouse Films, Magnolia Pictures, Timpson Films	Magnet Releasing	2 hrs 4 mins
The ABCs of Death	F is for Fart: Young Ladies and Poison Gas	Yasuhiko Fukuda	Yasutaka Nagano	Takanori Tsujimoto	Drafthouse Films, Magnolia Pictures, Timpson Films	Magnet Releasing	2 hrs 4 mins
The ABCs of Death	G is for Gravity	Andrew Traucki & Greg Ferris	Andrew Traucki & Larry Gray	Greg Ferris	Drafthouse Films, Magnolia Pictures, Timpson Films	Magnet Releasing	2 hrs 4 mins
The ABCs of Death	H is for Hydro-Electric Diffusion	Johannes Ringen	Magnus Flaato	Ove Kenneth Hilsen	Drafthouse Films, Timpson Films, Magnolia Pictures, Fantefilm, Hocus Focus, Arctic Action, Whitelight Studios	Magnet Releasing	2 hrs 4 mins
The ABCs of Death	I is for Ingrown	Hugo Quezada Monroy	Alberto Anaya Adalid	Rodrigo Rios Legaspi	Drafthouse Films, Timpson Films, Magnolia Pictures, Velarium Arts	Magnet Releasing	2 hrs 4 mins
The ABCs of Death	J is for Jidai-Geki (Samurai Movie)	Nobuhiko Morino	Shu G. Momose	Yudai Yamaguchi	Drafthouse Films, Timpson Films, Magnolia Pictures	Magnet Releasing	2 hrs 4 mins
The ABCs of Death	K is for Klutz	Morten Dalsgaard	Storyboarding/Animation by: Stine Marie Buhl, Mads Juul & Kristjan Møller	Martin Wichmann Andersen	Drafthouse Films, Timpson Films, Magnolia Pictures, Copenhagen Bombay Productions	Magnet Releasing	2 hrs 4 mins
The ABCs of Death	L is for Labido	Fajar Yuskemal & Aria Prayogi	Aga Wahyudi	Bobby Prabowo & Albert Prabowo	Drafthouse Films, Timpson Films, Magnolia Pictures	Magnet Releasing	2 hrs 4 mins
The ABCs of Death	M is for Miscarriage	Graham Reznick	Ti West	Ti West	Drafthouse Films, Timpson Films, Magnolia Pictures	Magnet Releasing	2 hrs 4 mins
The ABCs of Death	N is for Nuptials	Pakawat Wiwitaya	Naruphol Chokanapitak	Thammarat Sumethsupachok	Drafthouse Films, Timpson Films, Magnolia Pictures	Magnet Releasing	2 hrs 4 mins
The ABCs of Death	O is for Orgasm	Marie-Agnés Beaupain	Colin Lévèque	Bernard Beets	Drafthouse Films, Timpson Films, Magnolia Pictures, Setpigo Films, Anonymes Filmse	Magnet Releasing	2 hrs 4 mins
The ABCs of Death	P is for Pressure	Nancy De Randamie	Milton Kam	Rob Hall	Drafthouse Films, Timpson Films, Magnolia Pictures, Suriname Productions	Magnet Releasing	2 hrs 4 mins
The ABCs of Death	Q is for Quack	Mikhail Glinka	Juan Carlos Bagnell	Adam Wingard	Drafthouse Films, Timpson Films, Magnolia Pictures, Snoot Entertainment	Magnet Releasing	2 hrs 4 mins
The ABCs of Death	R is for Removed	Nenad Marković	Nemanja Jovanov	Natasa Damnjanović	Drafthouse Films, Timpson Films, Magnolia Pictures	Magnet Releasing	2 hrs 4 mins
The ABCs of Death	S is for Speed	Simon Boswell	Jake West	Jake West	Drafthouse Films, Timpson Films, Magnolia Pictures, Nucleus Films Ltd.	Magnet Releasing	2 hrs 4 mins
The ABCs of Death	T is for Toilet	Tim Atkins	Animation by: Lee Hardcastle	Lee Hardcastle	Drafthouse Films, Timpson Films, Magnolia Pictures	Magnet Releasing	2 hrs 4 mins
The ABCs of Death	U is for Unearthed	Martin Pavey	Laurie Rose	Ben Wheatley	Drafthouse Films, Timpson Films, Magnolia Pictures, Rook Films	Magnet Releasing	2 hrs 4 mins
The ABCs of Death	V is for Vagitus (The Cry of a Newborn Baby)	Kevin Riepl	Chayse Irvin	Greg Ng	Drafthouse Films, Timpson Films, Magnolia Pictures, Arctic Productions, Q Films, The Union of BC Film Performers	Magnet Releasing	2 hrs 4 mins
The ABCs of Death	W is for WTF!	Travis Simon & Jon Schnepp	Jon Schnepp	Tim Kolenut & Jon Schnepp	Drafthouse Films, Timpson Films, Magnolia Pictures	Magnet Releasing	2 hrs 4 mins
The ABCs of Death	W is for WTF!	Travis Simon & Jon Schnepp	Animation by: Travis Simon, Jon Schnepp, Dee Chavez, Nathan Rico & Darren Shaw	Tim Kolenut & Jon Schnepp	Drafthouse Films, Timpson Films, Magnolia Pictures	Magnet Releasing	2 hrs 4 mins
The ABCs of Death	X is for XXL	Yasmine Meddour	Antoine Marteau	Zohar Michel	Drafthouse Films, Timpson Films, Magnolia Pictures, Rita & the Ink Connection	Magnet Releasing	2 hrs 4 mins
The ABCs of Death	Y is for Youngbuck	Powerglove	Karim Hussain	Jason Eisener	Drafthouse Films, Timpson Films, Magnolia Pictures, Yer Dead Productions	Magnet Releasing	2 hrs 4 mins
The ABCs of Death	Z is for Zetsumetsu (Extinction)	Ko Nakagawa	Shu G. Momose	Yoshihiro Nishimura	Drafthouse Films, Timpson Films, Magnolia Pictures, Cinemaport Studios	Magnet Releasing	2 hrs 4 mins
ABCs of Death 2	Title Sequence	André Roessler & Isabel Greiwe	Animation by: Wolfgang Matzl & Moana Rom	Wolfgang Matzl	Drafthouse Films, Timpson Films, Magnolia Pictures	Magnet Releasing	2 hrs 4 mins
ABCs of Death 2	A is for Amateur	Mads Heldtberg	Andrew Wheeler & Benjamin Kitchens	John Welsey Whitton	Drafthouse Films, Timpson Films, Magnolia Pictures, Shadowcat Pictures	Magnet Releasing	2 hrs 4 mins
ABCs of Death 2	B is for Badger	Rob Entwistle	Nick Gillespie	Julian Barratt	Drafthouse Films, Timpson Films, Magnolia Pictures, Rook Films	Magnet Releasing	2 hrs 4 mins
ABCs of Death 2	C is for Capital Punishment	Chad Hobson	Adam Hall	Julian Gilbey & William Gilbey	Drafthouse Films, Timpson Films, Magnolia Pictures, Creativity Media	Magnet Releasing	2 hrs 4 mins
ABCs of Death 2	D is for Deloused	ZnO	Robert Morgan	Robert Morgan	Drafthouse Films, Timpson Films, Magnolia Pictures, Swartz Can Talk Studios	Magnet Releasing	2 hrs 4 mins
ABCs of Death 2	D is for Deloused	ZnO	Animation by: Robert Morgan	Robert Morgan	Drafthouse Films, Timpson Films, Magnolia Pictures, Swartz Can Talk Studios	Magnet Releasing	2 hrs 4 mins
ABCs of Death 2	E is for Equilibrium	Kyle Newmaster	Pedro Luque	Carlos Rafael Betancourt	Drafthouse Films, Timpson Films, Magnolia Pictures, The Cortez Brothers Productions, Producciones de le 5th Avenida	Magnet Releasing	2 hrs 4 mins
ABCs of Death 2	F is for Falling	Frank Ilfman	Nir Bar	Omer Ben David	Drafthouse Films, Timpson Films, Magnolia Pictures, Dream Catcher Productions	Magnet Releasing	2 hrs 4 mins
ABCs of Death 2	G is for Grandad	Rob Entwistle	Laurie Rose	Mark Brunett-Tenthree	Drafthouse Films, Timpson Films, Magnolia Pictures, Rook Films	Magnet Releasing	2 hrs 4 mins
ABCs of Death 2	H is for Head Games	Michael Nanna	Animation by: Bill Plympton	Sandrine Plympton & Wendy Cong Zhao	Drafthouse Films, Timpson Films, Magnolia Pictures, Plymptoons Studios	Magnet Releasing	2 hrs 4 mins
ABCs of Death 2	I is for Invincible	Erwin Romulo	J.A. Tadeña	Jay Halili	Drafthouse Films, Timpson Films, Magnolia Pictures, Reality Entertainment	Magnet Releasing	2 hrs 4 mins
ABCs of Death 2	J is for Jesus	Paulo Beto	José Roberto Eliezer	Paulo Sacramento	Drafthouse Films, Timpson Films, Magnolia Pictures, TC Filmes	Magnet Releasing	2 hrs 4 mins
ABCs of Death 2	K is for Knell	Vytis Puronas Maris Abolins & Andris Pakalns Janis Saldanais & Nadia Romanova	Rolandas Leonavicius	Tomas Rugys	Drafthouse Films, Timpson Films, Magnolia Pictures, Clan Su Productions, Okta Studios	Magnet Releasing	2 hrs 4 mins
ABCs of Death 2	L is for Legacy	Taiya Oviahon	Fortune Ejim Kazi	Amen Imasuen	Drafthouse Films, Timpson Films, Magnolia Pictures, IceSlides Films	Magnet Releasing	2 hrs 4 mins
ABCs of Death 2	M is for Masticate	Simon Thirlway	White Fence	Russell Lichter	Drafthouse Films, Timpson Films, Magnolia Pictures	Magnet Releasing	2 hrs 4 mins
ABCs of Death 2	N is for Nexus	Jeff Grace & Graham Reznick	Larry Fessenden & Chris Skotchdopole	Larry Fessenden	Drafthouse Films, Timpson Films, Magnolia Pictures, Glass Eye Pix Productions	Magnet Releasing	2 hrs 4 mins
ABCs of Death 2	O is for Ochlocracy (Mob Rule)	Hiroyuki Nagashima	Kenji Noguchi	Hajime Ohata	Drafthouse Films, Timpson Films, Magnolia Pictures, Shaiker Co. Ltd.	Magnet Releasing	2 hrs 4 mins
ABCs of Death 2	P is for P-P-P-P SCARY!	Nikolay Doktorov	Clay Liford	Scott Colquitt	Drafthouse Films, Timpson Films, Magnolia Pictures, Arts+Labor Studios	Magnet Releasing	2 hrs 4 mins
ABCs of Death 2	Q is for Questionnaire	Jonathan Snipes	Bridger Nielson	Rodney Ascher	Drafthouse Films, Timpson Films, Magnolia Pictures, Highland Park Classics Productions	Magnet Releasing	2 hrs 4 mins
ABCs of Death 2	R is for Roulette	Stefan Will & Marco Dreckkötter	Moritz Schultheiss	Jan Hille	Drafthouse Films, Timpson Films, Magnolia Pictures, MBF Filmtechnick Hamberg	Magnet Releasing	2 hrs 4 mins
ABCs of Death 2	S is for Split	Sergio Moure	Jon Britt	Richard Blackburn	Drafthouse Films, Timpson Films, Magnolia Pictures, The Tea Shop & Film Company, Maniac Fiction Films, Filmscape Media	Magnet Releasing	2 hrs 4 mins
ABCs of Death 2	T is for Torture Porn	Kevvy Mental	Mahlon Todd Williams	Bruce MacKinnon	Drafthouse Films, Timpson Films, Magnolia Pictures, Twisted Twins Productions	Magnet Releasing	2 hrs 4 mins
ABCs of Death 2	U is for Utopia	Alex Khaskin	Alex Gomez	Lindsay Allikas	Drafthouse Films, Timpson Films, Magnolia Pictures, Lifeguard Productions, Copperheart Entertainment,	Magnet Releasing	2 hrs 4 mins
ABCs of Death 2	V is for Vacation	Paul Losada	John Rutland	Nick Wenger	Drafthouse Films, Timpson Films, Magnolia Pictures, Jerome Sable & Nicholas Musurca Productions	Magnet Releasing	2 hrs 4 mins
ABCs of Death 2	W is for Wish	Jeremy Gillespie	Pierce Derks	Mike Hamilton	Drafthouse Films, Timpson Films, Magnolia Pictures	Magnet Releasing	2 hrs 4 mins
ABCs of Death 2	X is for Xylophone	Raphaël Gesqua	Antoine Sanier	Sébastien de Sainte-Croix	Drafthouse Films, Timpson Films, Magnolia Pictures	Magnet Releasing	2 hrs 4 mins
ABCs of Death 2	Y is for Youth	Jun Koyama	Shintaro Kuriyama	Kazuki Tobita	Drafthouse Films, Timpson Films, Magnolia Pictures, Soychiume Productions	Magnet Releasing	2 hrs 4 mins
ABCs of Death 2	Z is for Zygote	William M. Nash & Chris Nash	Ioana Vasile	Michael Lane & Chris Nash	Drafthouse Films, Timpson Films, Magnolia Pictures, Gasfire Films	Magnet Releasing	2 hrs 4 mins
ABC's of Death 2½	M is for Magnetic Tape	Ryan Rathjen & Johnny Love	Cody Kennedy	Angela Seehagen	Drafthouse Films, Timpson Films, Magnolia Pictures, Magnet Releasing Productions, Vimeo Entertainment	Magnet Releasing, Vimeo Inc., FilmBuff Distribution Co.	1 hr 25 mins
ABC's of Death 2½	M is for Maieusiophobia (The Fear of Giving Birth)	Rami Abdou	Christopher Younes & Jeff Sebastian	Christopher Younes	Drafthouse Films, Timpson Films, Magnolia Pictures, Magnet Releasing Productions, Vimeo Entertainment	Magnet Releasing, Vimeo Inc., FilmBuff Distribution Co.	1 hr 25 mins
ABC's of Death 2½	M is for Maieusiophobia (The Fear of Giving Birth)	Rami Abdou	Animation by: Christopher Younes	Christopher Younes	Drafthouse Films, Timpson Films, Magnolia Pictures, Magnet Releasing Productions, Vimeo Entertainment	Magnet Releasing, Vimeo Inc., FilmBuff Distribution Co.	1 hr 25 mins
ABC's of Death 2½	M is for Mailbox	Mauricio Zani	Aline Biz	Daniel Weber	Drafthouse Films, Timpson Films, Magnolia Pictures, Magnet Releasing Productions, Vimeo Entertainment, Urubu Filmes	Magnet Releasing, Vimeo Inc., FilmBuff Distribution Co.	1 hr 25 mins
ABC's of Death 2½	M is for Make Believe	Eric Dwight	Jason Westphal	Jason Westphal	Drafthouse Films, Timpson Films, Magnolia Pictures, Magnet Releasing Productions, Vimeo Entertainment	Magnet Releasing, Vimeo Inc., FilmBuff Distribution Co.	1 hr 25 mins
ABC's of Death 2½	M is for Malnutrition	Jozef Vlk	Ivan Finta	Miroslav Roháček	Drafthouse Films, Timpson Films, Magnolia Pictures, Magnet Releasing Productions, Vimeo Entertainment	Magnet Releasing, Vimeo Inc., FilmBuff Distribution Co.	1 hr 25 mins
ABC's of Death 2½	M is for Manure	Anwar Deeb	Jason Baskey	Jason Baskey	Drafthouse Films, Timpson Films, Magnolia Pictures, Magnet Releasing Productions, Vimeo Entertainment	Magnet Releasing, Vimeo Inc., FilmBuff Distribution Co.	1 hr 25 mins
ABC's of Death 2½	M is for Marauder	Zachary Cotton	Steve Daniels	Steve Daniels	Drafthouse Films, Timpson Films, Magnolia Pictures, Magnet Releasing Productions, Vimeo Entertainment	Magnet Releasing, Vimeo Inc., FilmBuff Distribution Co.	1 hr 25 mins
ABC's of Death 2½	M is for Mariachi	Eric Romary	Rommel Genciana	Eric Pennycoff	Drafthouse Films, Timpson Films, Magnolia Pictures, Magnet Releasing Productions, Vimeo Entertainment	Magnet Releasing, Vimeo Inc., FilmBuff Distribution Co.	1 hr 25 mins
ABC's of Death 2½	M is for Marriage	Auditory Sculpture & Keith Schreiner	Philip A. Anderson	Todd E. Freeman	Drafthouse Films, Timpson Films, Magnolia Pictures, Magnet Releasing Productions, Vimeo Entertainment	Magnet Releasing, Vimeo Inc., FilmBuff Distribution Co.	1 hr 25 mins
ABC's of Death 2½	M is for Martyr	Jacob Foy	J. Otis Dynamite	Peter Kuhn	Drafthouse Films, Timpson Films, Magnolia Pictures, Magnet Releasing Productions, Vimeo Entertainment	Magnet Releasing, Vimeo Inc., FilmBuff Distribution Co.	1 hr 25 mins
ABC's of Death 2½	M is for Matador	Chase Horseman	Luke Bramley	Gigi Saul Guerrero & Luke Bramley	Drafthouse Films, Timpson Films, Magnolia Pictures, Magnet Releasing Productions, Vimeo Entertainment	Magnet Releasing, Vimeo Inc., FilmBuff Distribution Co.	1 hr 25 mins
ABC's of Death 2½	M is for Meat	Ilya Kaplan	Wolfgang Matzl & Moana Rom	Wolfgang Matzl	Drafthouse Films, Timpson Films, Magnolia Pictures, Magnet Releasing Productions, Vimeo Entertainment	Magnet Releasing, Vimeo Inc., FilmBuff Distribution Co.	1 hr 25 mins
ABC's of Death 2½	M is for Meat	Ilya Kaplan	Animation by: Wolfgang Matzl	Wolfgang Matzl	Drafthouse Films, Timpson Films, Magnolia Pictures, Magnet Releasing Productions, Vimeo Entertainment	Magnet Releasing, Vimeo Inc., FilmBuff Distribution Co.	1 hr 25 mins
ABC's of Death 2½	M is for Mermaid	Michael Connelley	Diego Madrigal	Michael Gilmore	Drafthouse Films, Timpson Films, Magnolia Pictures, Magnet Releasing Productions, Vimeo Entertainment	Magnet Releasing, Vimeo Inc., FilmBuff Distribution Co.	1 hr 25 mins
ABC's of Death 2½	M is for Merry Christmas	Thomas Crabb	Rowan Stas, Ben Galler & Simon Curd	Joe Stas & Lloyd Stas	Drafthouse Films, Timpson Films, Magnolia Pictures, Magnet Releasing Productions, Vimeo Entertainment	Magnet Releasing, Vimeo Inc., FilmBuff Distribution Co.	1 hr 25 mins
ABC's of Death 2½	M is for Mess	Arthur Presta	Carlos Faria	Carlos Faria	Drafthouse Films, Timpson Films, Magnolia Pictures, Magnet Releasing Productions, Vimeo Entertainment	Magnet Releasing, Vimeo Inc., FilmBuff Distribution Co.	1 hr 25 mins
ABC's of Death 2½	M is for Messiah	Red Heartbreaker	Darren Borrowman	Darren Borrowman	Drafthouse Films, Timpson Films, Magnolia Pictures, Magnet Releasing Productions, Vimeo Entertainment, Borrowtime Films	Magnet Releasing, Vimeo Inc., FilmBuff Distribution Co.	1 hr 25 mins
ABC's of Death 2½	M is for Mind Meld	Joe Stacey	Jimmie Parker	Jara Wallace	Drafthouse Films, Timpson Films, Magnolia Pictures, Magnet Releasing Productions, Vimeo Entertainment	Magnet Releasing, Vimeo Inc., FilmBuff Distribution Co.	1 hr 25 mins
ABC's of Death 2½	M is for Miracle	Jorge Granda & Jorge Lacasta	Carlos Ferragut	Álvaro Núñez	Drafthouse Films, Timpson Films, Magnolia Pictures, Magnet Releasing Productions, Vimeo Entertainment	Magnet Releasing, Vimeo Inc., FilmBuff Distribution Co.	1 hr 25 mins
ABC's of Death 2½	M is for Mobile	Burak Topalakcı	Taner Tamer	Murat Secan Subası	Drafthouse Films, Timpson Films, Magnolia Pictures, Magnet Releasing Productions, Vimeo Entertainment	Magnet Releasing, Vimeo Inc., FilmBuff Distribution Co.	1 hr 25 mins
ABC's of Death 2½	M is for Mom	Zacarías M. de la Riva	Kyle Klütz	Alberto Bernad	Drafthouse Films, Timpson Films, Magnolia Pictures, Magnet Releasing Productions, Vimeo Entertainment, 3Roundburst Productions	Magnet Releasing, Vimeo Inc., FilmBuff Distribution Co.	1 hr 25 mins
ABC's of Death 2½	M is for Moonstruck	Scott Glasgow	Shannon Betz	Travis Betz	Drafthouse Films, Timpson Films, Magnolia Pictures, Magnet Releasing Productions, Vimeo Entertainment	Magnet Releasing, Vimeo Inc., FilmBuff Distribution Co.	1 hr 25 mins
ABC's of Death 2½	M is for Moonstruck	Scott Glasgow	Animation by: Travis Betz	Travis Betz	Drafthouse Films, Timpson Films, Magnolia Pictures, Magnet Releasing Productions, Vimeo Entertainment	Magnet Releasing, Vimeo Inc., FilmBuff Distribution Co.	1 hr 25 mins
ABC's of Death 2½	M is for Mormon Missionaries	Tommy Peskorz	Charles DeRosa	Peter Podgursky	Drafthouse Films, Timpson Films, Magnolia Pictures, Magnet Releasing Productions, Vimeo Entertainment	Magnet Releasing, Vimeo Inc., FilmBuff Distribution Co.	1 hr 25 mins
ABC's of Death 2½	M is for Mother	Russ Howard III	Tristan Whitman	Ryan Bosworth	Drafthouse Films, Timpson Films, Magnolia Pictures, Magnet Releasing Productions, Vimeo Entertainment	Magnet Releasing, Vimeo Inc., FilmBuff Distribution Co.	1 hr 25 mins
ABC's of Death 2½	M is for Muff	Jamie Murgatroyd	Tim Egan	Dave Redman	Drafthouse Films, Timpson Films, Magnolia Pictures, Magnet Releasing Productions, Vimeo Entertainment	Magnet Releasing, Vimeo Inc., FilmBuff Distribution Co.	1 hr 25 mins
ABC's of Death 2½	M is for Munging	Paul Joyce	Nate Spivey	Jason Koch & Clint Kelly	Drafthouse Films, Timpson Films, Magnolia Pictures, Magnet Releasing Productions, Vimeo Entertainment	Magnet Releasing, Vimeo Inc., FilmBuff Distribution Co.	1 hr 25 mins
ABC's of Death 2½	M is for Mutant	Heath Brown	Stuart Simpson	Stuart Simpson	Drafthouse Films, Timpson Films, Magnolia Pictures, Magnet Releasing Productions, Vimeo Entertainment, Lost Art Films 2013	Magnet Releasing, Vimeo Inc., FilmBuff Distribution Co.	1 hr 25 mins
ABC's of Death 2½	M is for Mutant	Heath Brown	Animation by: Stuart Simpson	Stuart Simpson	Drafthouse Films, Timpson Films, Magnolia Pictures, Magnet Releasing Productions, Vimeo Entertainment, Lost Art Films 2013	Magnet Releasing, Vimeo Inc., FilmBuff Distribution Co.	1 hr 25 mins

== Reception ==
=== Box office performance ===
Film	Box office gross			Box office ranking		Video sales gross	Worldwide total gross income	Budget	Worldwide total net income/loss	Ref.
Film	North America	Other territories	Worldwide	All time North America	All time worldwide	Video sales gross	Worldwide total gross income	Budget	Worldwide total net income/loss	Ref.
The ABCs of Death	$21,832	$13,304	$35,136	#14,928	#21,322	Information not publicly available	>$35,136	$130,000	≥-$94,864	
ABCs of Death 2	$7,171	—N/a	$7,171	#16,476	#31,475	$108,360	$115,531	$130,000	-$14,469	
ABC's of Death 2½	—N/a	—N/a	—N/a	—N/a	—N/a	Information not publicly available	Information not publicly available	Information not publicly available (Note: As each segment of this installment was independently produced by amateur filmmakers and submitted to the studio for a chance to feature in ABCs of Death 2, the individual small budgets of these segments are unknown; though they were not produced by the studio's funding.)	>$0	
Totals	$29,003	$13,304	$42,307	x̄ #10,468	x̄ #17,599	>$108,360	>$150,667	>$260,000	≥-$109,333	

=== Critical and public response ===
Film	Rotten Tomatoes	Metacritic
The ABCs of Death	37% (67 reviews)	43/100 (16 reviews)
ABCs of Death 2	73% (33 reviews)	53/100 (10 reviews)
ABC's of Death 2½		—N/a
