= ABCs of Death 2 =

- Theatrical release poster
- Directed by: Various directors
- Written by: Various screenwriters
- Produced by: Ant Timpson; Tim League
- Starring: Various actors
- Cinematography: Various cinematographers
- Edited by: Various editors
- Music by: Various composers
- Production companies: Drafthouse Films; Timpson Films; Magnolia Pictures
- Distributed by: Magnet Releasing
- Release dates: September 18, 2014 (Fantastic Fest); January 1, 2017 (Limited release)
- Running time: 124 minutes
- Country: United States
- Language: Various languages
- Box office: $7,171

ABCs of Death 2 is a 2014 American comedy horror anthology film produced by Ant Timpson and Tim League. It contains 26 different shorts, each by different directors spanning various countries. It is a sequel to The ABCs of Death (2012), and second installment in the ABCs of Death film series. Directors featured include Jim Hosking, Lancelot Oduwa Imasuen, the Soska sisters, Julian Barratt, Rodney Ascher, Kristina Buožytė, Larry Fessenden, Navot Papushado, Aharon Keshales, Bill Plympton, and Vincenzo Natali.

The film received a much more positive response than its predecessor. A second sequel titled ABCs of Death 3: Teach Harder was announced to be in development during the post-credits title card. However, due to illegal pirating of the second film, the status of the project has been left in development hell. Despite this, producers released what they categorized as a spin-off, titled ABC's of Death 2½ in 2016.

== Background ==
Like the first film, the sequel is divided into 26 individual chapters, each helmed by a different director assigned a letter of the alphabet. The directors were then given free rein in choosing a word to create a story involving death. The varieties of death range from accidents to murders.

A contest was held for the role of the 26th director. The winner was music video director Robert Boocheck, who submitted his short for M.

== Plot ==
The movie begins with a creepy stop-motion storybook that opens showing children doing a variety of fun activities that end up being very deadly (i.e. a jump rope slices a girl in half, children playing ball with a boy's head and a girl on a swing made from a boy's intestines). Throughout the film, a teacher with a skeleton face presents the titles to all the segments, with each of the segments ending and beginning with a focus on, or a fade into, the color black.

Title	Written and directed by	Description
A is for Amateur	E. L. Katz	From the United States. An assassin is hired to kill a notorious drug dealer. The assassin makes it to the building, crawls through the air vents and kills his target. This, however, turns out to be a fantasy, as when he gets to the air vents, they are realistically small, dirty and covered with sharp objects. The assassin gets stuck and bleeds to death. Three weeks later, the smell of rotting flesh leads those in the drug dealer's apartment to the assassin's corpse, which then falls from the air vents, causing his gun to go off and kill his target. Cast: Eric Jacobus as Assassin, Andy Nyman as Coke Dealer, Simon Barrett as Assassin's Employer, Teela Cull, Kelsey Hudson, and Stephanie Wood as Escorts, Xin Sarith Wuku as Maintenance Worker, Ben Maccabee as Big Guy, Jason Cabell as Arnold, Josh Ethier as Jack, David Gutierrez as Dominator, Giovannie Dixon as Security Guard, Eliver Ling as Assassin Stand In
B is for Badger	Julian Barratt	From the United Kingdom. In the first found footage short, Peter Toland, a rude, narcissistic wildlife documentary director berates his crew as he tries to report on the local badgers that have presumably been killed off by waste from a nearby power plant. While Toland is busy, the crew hear unusual sounds, and when they insert a boom mic into a badger sett to inspect the source of the noise, the mic cover is chewed up and spat out again by an unseen creature. Toland returns to further berate them, but is then attacked and bisected by the same creature. Toland's upper half is then spat out, his last words being "cut". Cast: Julian Barratt as Peter, Will Adamsdale as Director, Matthew Steer as Sound Man, Candy Alderson as Make-Up Artist, Stanley White as Badger
C is for Capital Punishment	Julian Gilbey	From the United Kingdom. Fletcher is accused by the population of a small town of killing local teenager Lucy Wilson, and is sentenced to be executed in the woods. The locals, however, then discover from a breaking news report that Lucy ran away with her boyfriend and has been found alive. Two of the townspeople race to stop the execution, but get into a car accident and die. After a number of inept execution attempts leave Fletcher horribly wounded and in agony, he is finally beheaded. Cast: Ian Virgo as Fletcher, Ryan Winsley as Tobias, Tom Bonington as Father Chester, Dominic Mowbray as Barclay, Felix Hartley-Russell as Jasper, Matthew Woodruffe as Village Authority, William Gilbey as Gilroy, Michael Gilbey as Dudley, Lauren Dallison as Lucy, Oliver Nice as Lucy's Boyfriend, Jill Reynolds and Mark Holownia as Police Officers, Sophia Ellis as News Reporter (voice), Georgina Oliver as Mother, Freddie and Wolfie Mowbray as The Two Kids, Sophie Mowbray, Sarah Henry, Pip Turner, Stephanie Jones, Malcolm Jones, Allison Dallison, Adrian Dallison, Steve Blair, Drew Cullingham, Christopher Jeff, Bev Bagnall, Elle Darby, Andy Whyborn, and Debs Wheeler as The Kangaroo Court
D is for Deloused	Robert Morgan	From the United Kingdom. In this stop-motion animated short, a man is being held prisoner in a dingy chamber, strapped to a table. A trio of louse-covered, fleshy ghouls enter the room and kill the man, using a needle-tipped, vacuum-like tube. As they leave, one of the ghouls swats and crushes a louse, and from its remains a giant louse soon emerges. This louse consumes the dead man's hand, creating a living copy of him who then beheads his killers. He takes their heads and shoves them into the insect's abdomen, only for his head to get stuck in the hole. He pulls it out, but his neck gets distended. The headless ghouls take his original head and shove it into the abdomen as they all die. The giant insect becomes small and crawls into what was once the man's head. Cast: Robert Morgan as Demon (voice; uncredited)
E is for Equilibrium	Alejandro Brugués	From Cuba. Two castaways lead a dull life, when one day a young woman washes up on the beach. The two take care of her and she brings them back to a civilized state, with her falling in love with the younger castaway. The older castaway soon grows jealous and sabotages their growing love. The two men fight, but in a moment of reflection the younger man kills the woman instead. The two men are seen standing on the beach with a sign that once said "SEND HELP" now reading "SEND BEER". Cast: Miguel Muñoz and Fernando Costa as The Castaways, Martina Garcia as Woman
F is for Falling	Aharon Keshales and Navot Papushado	From Israel. An Israeli female paratrooper wakes up stuck in a tree and is found by an Arab boy. The boy threatens to shoot her due to them being enemies, but the woman reasons to the boy to instead cut her down and take her to his commanders. After some hesitation, the boy cuts her down, but the woman breaks her leg. The boy fumbles his gun and accidentally shoots himself. Overcome with sympathy, the woman cradles the boy's body as his reinforcements arrive. Cast: Dana Meinrath as Soldier, Tawfeek Barhom as Arab Boy, Basaam Bader, Ibraheem Ganem, and Adam Jabber as Reinforcements
G is for Grandad	Jim Hosking	From the United Kingdom. A rude young man who has been living with his grandfather for a year is exasperated by his grandfather's retro taste and lifestyle. They prepare for bed as the young man mocks his grandfather. However, the young man is horrified to learn that his grandfather lives under his bed and dresses just like him. He stabs his grandson in the neck before revealing that he is a eunuch. Cast: Nicholas Amer as Grandad, Richard Hardisty as Grandson
H is for Head Games	Bill Plympton	From the United States. In an animated short, a man and woman kiss until their tongues, eyeballs and other features become weapons blasting at each other. The short ends with both of their heads now containing big holes as the two collapse. Cast: Michael Nanna as Man (voice), Ingrida Pleiryte as Woman (voice)
I is for Invincible	Erik Matti	From the Philippines. A family has the matriarch tied up to a chair as they stab, shoot and poison her in an attempt to gain their inheritance. She offers a stone that she keeps in her mouth that curses her with invincibility, but the family refuses. Eventually, Caloy, one of the inheritors, sets her on fire. As the family figure how to split the inheritance, the matriarch rises, mocking them. Carmela, the youngest, beheads her, but the matriarch spits the stone into her mouth, causing Carmela to swallow the stone and allowing the matriarch to die. Cast: Sherry Lara as Mama, Jun Urbano as Caloy, Tommy Abuel as Quinito, Arlene Muhlach as Conchita, Yayo Aguila as Carmela
J is for Jesus	Dennison Ramalho	From Brazil. A young man is kidnapped by an evangelist and a reverend for being gay after being hired by the man's father. They imply to the man that his lover was killed by them. As they torture him to "convert", the young man sees them as horrific monsters. The young man's lover appears as a pale-skinned being and kills the torturers before branding a tattoo on the man reading "Love is the Law". Cast: Francisco Barreiro, Roberto Alencar, Valter Santos, Jiddu Pinheiro, Carlos Meceni
K is for Knell	Kristina Buožytė and Bruno Samper	From Lithuania. A girl is painting her toes in her apartment, when she notices that a black liquid sphere floats in the sky, near the adjacent building. Suddenly the people living in it go berserk, brutally fighting each other. The survivors then stare at her through their windows. She realizes that a strange black liquid is slowly taking over her building and that she cannot escape. Eventually, she begins to bleed as a trail of her blood touches a trail of the black liquid. Cast: Julija Steponaityte as The Girl
L is for Legacy	Lancelot Oduwa Imasuen	From Nigeria. Ogiso Owodo is tasked by his queen, Esaogho, to sacrifice the prince so that the women of their village can have more male children. He refuses and instead kills a rat and bathes his sword in its blood. In retaliation, the demon, Ubini, appears in the village and slaughters many of the people. Ogiso is later shown being shamed for not fulfilling his duty. Cast: Michael Isokpan as Prince, Ehigiator Nosa as Esaogho, Godwin Uwaifo as Ogiso, Philip O Philip as Ubini, Orhokhan John, Osariemen Omorogie, Osahenaga Omorogie, Lucky Omogiede, Omosigho Edward, Favour Idahosa, Chiturume Okoromkwo, Ikponmwenosa Esosa, Ehator Gift, Imade Julia Gift, Therease Idehen, Justina Esedabe, and Iden Davina Diamond as Village People, Rita Ihimekpen as Pregnant Woman, Joseph Uhunmwiagho as Chief Priest
M is for Masticate	Robert Boocheck	From the United States. A man, credited as himself, is seen running down the street in his underwear in slow-motion. He shoves many civilians out of the way before attacking and biting the ear off of a bystander. A cop arrives and shoots Pat dead. 34 minutes earlier, it is revealed that Pat had taken bath salts after being offered them by a friend. Cast: Patrick Daniel as Himself, Joe O'Dell as Jogger, Kestrin Pantera-Grubb as Terrorized Woman, Rob Lamorgese as Victim, Brittany Noel as Screaming Woman, Rob D'Alosio as Scared Man, Anthony Nuccio as Cop, Robert Boocheck as The Pusher
N is for Nexus	Larry Fessenden	From the United States. A man, dressed as the Frankenstein Monster, hurries to meet his girlfriend, dressed as the Bride, on Halloween. Meanwhile, an impatient business woman and her distracted cab driver race through the streets. The Bride briefly interacts with a skeleton boy and his pirate father as the Monster races on his bike. The driver, distracted by his crossword puzzle, hits the Monster, whose bike hits the skeleton, killing them both. The Bride screams in terror. Cast: Lauren Molina as Bride, Michael Vincent as Monster, Hanna Cheek as Passenger, Aaron Beall as Driver, Lexington Sloane Kennedy as Skeleton, Aurelio Voltaire as Pirate, Chris Skotchdopole as Luche, Sarah Langan as Witch, J.T. Petty as Norman, Clementine Jane Petty as Firestar, Frances Petty as Batman, Reuben Foster as Devil, Jude Foster as Werewolf, Mannix MacCumhail as Blue Monster, Jack Fessenden, Dalton Salisbury, and Gus Moody as Home Invaders
O is for Ochlocracy (Mob Rule)	Hajime Ohata	From Japan. Kana Miyazaki is put on trial by zombies for her "murderous rampage" against them, despite there already being a cure called Z-cu. She even shot her own daughter, Mai, when she was bitten. Much of the evidence points to her guilt, even though it was self-defense, and even Mai, now a zombie, pleads against her, saying that "she enjoyed it". Kana is placed in the electric chair, where previous living people lie dead in front of her. After swearing that she will kill them all, the officer pulls the switch, but Kana and the previous dead prisoners come back as zombies. Cast: Aki Morita as Kana, Takahiro Ono as Public Prosecutor, Kazuhiro Nakahara, Kenta Kiguchi, and Marika Yamakawa as Judges, Takashi Nishina as Attorney, Yui Sato as Mai, Kensuke Ashihara as Zombie Head, Tatsuya Matsubara as Zombie, Ryûki Kitaoka and Kunihiko Watanabe as Police Officers, Sawa Masaki as Court Clerk, Kiichi Sonobe as Defendant, Hiroaki Suda as Spectator
P is for P-P-P-P SCARY!	Todd Rohal	From the United States. An homage to black and white comedy, Kirby, Puppy and Bart, dressed as prisoners, find themselves in a dark void with only a candle for light. They find a man with a baby, who begins dancing to an Irish jig. The man, whose face begins distorting, blows out their candle numerous times, until Kirby realizes that Puppy and Bart have transformed into grotesque puddles. The man reveals the baby's face, an adult man's face, and blows out the candle one last time. Cast: Ivan Dimitrov as Himself, Bryan Connolly, David Strong, and Vincent Prendergast as Kirby, Puppy, and Bart
Q is for Questionnaire	Rodney Ascher	From the United States. A man takes an intelligence test on the street with a nice woman, who notes that he is doing well. Juxtaposed with this scene is footage of the man's brain being removed from his head, then transplanted into a gorilla after he aced the test. Cast: Jordan D. Morris as Testee, Jess Lane as Tester, Jim Earl as Surgeon, John Terrey as Bananas Gorilla, Tim Kirk as Orderly
R is for Roulette	Marvin Kren	From Austria. Michael, Nina and Klaus are in a basement playing Russian roulette. They take turns pulling the trigger, but none of them get the bullet. On the sixth try, Michael is next. He and Nina tell each other that they love each other, but Michael turns the gun on Nina, killing her. Klaus checks on a noise from upstairs. Michael thinks that it will not be that bad, with Klaus following up with "We're about to find out". Cast: André Hennicke as Klaus, Alma Leiberg as Nina, Andreas Döhler as Michael
S is for Split	Juan Martinez Moreno	From Spain. Robert is on a business trip in France and calls his wife Miriam, who is in Great Britain. An intruder breaks into Miriam's house and chases her with a ball-peen hammer. Robert calls the police, but the intruder chases down Miriam and kills her before going to check on their baby. Robert pleads with the intruder, who turns out to be a woman who asks Robert if she could speak to her husband. It is revealed that Robert has been having an affair with a man who is implied to be said husband, as police sirens are heard. Cast: Victoria Broom as Miriam, Alan McKenna as Robert, Mathew Kaye as Intruder Masked, Kiera Gould as Intruder Unmasked, Gary Reimer as Husband, Joanna Shayer as Receptionist, Esme Fantauzzo as Baby
T is for Torture Porn	Jen and Sylvia Soska	From Canada. Yumi is being filmed by a group of misogynistic and abusive filmmakers. The men strip her down and prepare to film her, when one of them spots what they think is a penis. Yumi then reveals that she has tentacles where her clitoris should be and proceeds to use them to kill the filmmakers. Cast: Tristan Risk as Yumi, Conor Sweeney as Gonzo, C. Ernst Harth and Sean Hewlett as Porn Guys, Paul Biason as Sole Survivor, Lee Majdoub as Office Temp, Laurence Harvey as Wanker
U is for Utopia	Vincenzo Natali	From Canada. In a Utopian society where everyone is attractive and beautiful, a rather plump, poorly dressed man appears, looking nervous as the Utopians watch him. He knocks down a sign causing everyone to scan him, revealing him to be a sub-norm. A robot appears, drags him inside of it and incinerates the sub-norm. Everyone applauds and returns to their usual day. Cast: James McDougall as The Man
V is for Vacation	Jerome Sable	From Canada. In the second found footage short, Curt video chats with his girlfriend Amber over the phone. Dylan, Curt's friend, takes the phone and reveals that he and Curt have been taking drugs and drinking heavily. Dylan also reveals that they both hooked up with two local women, Kim and Rose. Curt hits Kim and takes the phone away, but Amber is upset. Suddenly Rose grabs a screwdriver and kills Dylan. She then shoves Curt off the balcony of the hotel to his death. Kim and Amber scream in horror as Rose covers the phone. Cast: Mark Grossman as Curt, Jeord Meagher as Dylan, Petra Lo as Rose, Ranelle Estrellado as Kim, Melody Sample as Amber
W is for Wish	Steven Kostanski	From Canada. The short starts as an 80's-esque commercial for "Champions of Zorb", a line of action figures. Two boys playing with figures from the set wish to be transported to the fantasy world of Harmonia, where Prince Casio and Fantasy Man battle the evil Zorb. They arrive there only to discover that Prince Casio, the supposed hero, is cowering in fear over the immense violence and death wrought by Zorb's minions upon the Harmonians. The boys are captured and taken to the citadel of Zorb. One of the boys, seen still holding his Zorb action figure, is brought to Zorb and incinerated. The other boy ends up imprisoned, but is rescued by Fantasy Man, who is a paunchy old man. Urging the boy, whom Fantasy Man calls "princess", to get into a sack, Fantasy Man carries him from Zorb's citadel. They ride away on a bug as the boy begs to be let go. Cast: Willem Halfyard and Rafferty Blumberg as Kids, Jano Badovinac as Casio, Jason Edmiston as Andromecles, Dave Wheeler as Commercial Narrator, Jason Detheridge as Fungor, Peter Hodgins as Fantasy Man, Andrew Cook as Zorb, Jen and Sylvia Soska as Witch Queens
X is for Xylophone	Julien Maury and Alexandre Bustillo	From France. A grandmother is watching over her grandchild playing with a toy xylophone while listening to a gramophone. The grandmother is eventually disturbed by the grandchild's rough music on her xylophone. As the parents return home, they find the grandmother playing with her grandchild's corpse, using the bones like a xylophone. Cast: Béatrice Dalle as Grandmother, Tess Maury as The Girl, Chloé Coulloud as Mother, Iván González as Father
Y is for Youth	Soichi Umezawa	From Japan. Miyuki writes a letter on her phone to her parents who have disappointed her. As she expresses their problems (her father failed to care for a dog and became a teacher instead of a guitarist, while her mother is too lazy to do anything) she imagines the problems personified attacking her parents in grotesque and supernatural ways. Each problem leaves a cut on Miyuki's arm. Realizing that cutting herself is not the answer, Miyuki angrily charges at her parents as the word "LIVE" is flashed onscreen. Cast: Sakurako Mizuki as Miyuki, Suzuka Hirano as Young Miyuki, Shigeru Oxe as Father, Asuka Kurosawa as Mother, Jersey Maki Itosu as Taro
Z is for Zygote	Chris Nash	From Canada. A pregnant woman is left by herself by her husband, who leaves her "Portlock root" to prevent the baby from being born. 13 years later, the woman is still pregnant, but the child has grown inside of her and can speak. The woman does not want her child to leave, even though it is slowing her down and is shocked when the root runs out. The child then kills its mother and disembowels her, wearing her skin. Ti, the husband, returns. However the woman tells him (while showing a large scar on her abdomen) that she couldn't wait any longer and had to cut the fetus out. Ti offers to start fresh as the woman/child takes her clothes off. Cast: Delphine Roussel as Woman, Timothy Paul McCarthy as Ti, Lea Lawrynowicz as Child, Charlie the Cat as Himself In a post-credits scene a man (Laurence R. Harvey) is seen masturbating to T is for Torture Porn, but stops after being put off by the content

== Reception ==
The review aggregator website Rotten Tomatoes reported a 77% approval rating based on 31 reviews, with an average rating of 6.2/10. The website's critical consensus reads, "ABCs of Death 2 delivers some inventively gory thrills, offering a surprising (albeit still somewhat uneven) upgrade over its predecessor". Metacritic, which uses a weighted average, assigned a score of 53 out of 100 based on ten critics, indicating "mixed or average" reviews.
