= Drafthouse Films =

Film distribution company based in Austin, Texas

- Type: Private
- Industry: Film distribution
- Founded: 2010; 16 years ago
- Founder: Tim League
- Headquarters: Austin, Texas, United States
- Key people: Tim League, Nick Savva
- Owner: Nick Savva (CEO)
- Parent: Alamo Drafthouse Cinema (2010–2022); Giant Pictures (2022–present)
- Website: Drafthouse Films

Drafthouse Films is an independent film distribution company based in Austin, Texas. It was founded in 2010 by Tim League, who had previously founded the Alamo Drafthouse Cinema chain. In its own words, Drafthouse produces "provocative, visionary and artfully unusual films", several of which have become cult classics.

== History ==
Drafthouse films was founded in 2010 by Tim League as the in-house distribution arm of Alamo Drafthouse Cinema. The first film to be distributed by Drafthouse was Four Lions in 2010. Like the Alamo Drafthouse Cinema's brand, Drafthouse Films became associated with stylistically unique and sometimes bizarre films, some of which have become cult classics.

In March 2022, it was announced that digital distributor Giant Pictures had acquired the Drafthouse Films label. Nick Savva became the new Drafthouse Films CEO, with Tim League as chairman of the acquired company.

== Releases ==
- Four Lions (2010)
- Comin' at Ya! (1981, re-released in 2012)
- The FP (2012)
- Bullhead (2012)
- Klown (2012)
- Trailer War (2012)
- The Ambassador (2012)
- Miami Connection (1987, re-released in 2012)
- Wake in Fright (1971, re-released in 2012)
- The ABCs of Death (2013)
- Wrong (2013)
- Graceland (2013)
- Pietà (2013)
- A Band Called Death (2013)
- I Declare War (2013)
- The Act of Killing (2013)
- The Visitor (1979, re-released in 2013)
- Ms. 45 (1981, re-released in 2013)
- A Field in England (2014)
- Cheap Thrills (2014)
- The Final Member (2014)
- Borgman (2014)
- Nothing Bad Can Happen (2014)
- Mood Indigo (2014)
- The Dog (2014)
- The Congress (2014)
- 20,000 Days on Earth (2014)
- Fishing Without Nets (2014)
- The Overnighters (2014)
- Why Don't You Play in Hell? (2014)
- R100 (2014)
- Amira & Sam (2015)
- ABCs of Death 2 (2015)
- Spring (2015)
- The Connection (2015)
- The Keeping Room (2015)
- Dangerous Men (2005, re-released in 2015)
- The World of Kanako (2015)
- The Look of Silence (2015)
- The Tribe (2015)
- The Invitation (2015)
- Roar (1981, re-released in 2015)
- Klown Forever (2015)
- Raiders!: The Story of the Greatest Fan Film Ever Made (2016)
- Men & Chicken (2015)
- The Greasy Strangler (2016)
- We Are X (2016)
- ABCs of Death 2.5 (2016)
- Jallikattu (2021)
- Nr. 10 (2021)
- Masking Threshold (2021)
- Chop & Steele (2023)
- A Life on the Farm (2023)
- The YouTube Effect (2023)
- Once Upon a Time in Uganda (2023)
- Mister Organ (2023)
- Everyone Will Burn (2023)
- Kim's Video (2023)
- Humanist Vampire Seeking Consenting Suicidal Person (2024)
- Caligula: The Ultimate Cut (1979, re-released in 2024)
- The Birthday (2024)
- Ebony & Ivory (2025)
- Thank You Very Much (2025)
- Freaked (1993, re-released in 2025)
- A Safe Distance (2026)

== Accolades ==
Its third release, Bullhead, was nominated for an Academy Award for Best Foreign Language Film. Its fourteenth release, The Act of Killing, was nominated for an Academy Award for Best Documentary Feature, as was its sequel The Look of Silence.

== See also ==
- Neon
- List of companies based in Austin, Texas
