= ABC's of Death 2½ =

- Promotional poster
- Directed by: Various directors
- Written by: Various screenwriters
- Produced by: Ant Timpson; Ted Geoghegan; Tim League
- Starring: Various actors
- Cinematography: Various cinematographers
- Edited by: Various editors
- Music by: Various composers
- Production companies: Drafthouse Films; Timpson Films
- Distributed by: FilmBuff
- Release dates: October 20, 2016 (Columbus Nightmares Film Festival); October 31, 2017 (Limited release)
- Running time: 85 minutes
- Country: United States

ABC's of Death 2½ (also known on-screen as ABCs of Death 2.5, or also referred to as ABC's of Death 2½: World Competition Edition) is a 2016 American comedy horror anthology film produced by Ant Timpson, Ted Geoghegan, and Tim League. It contains shorts, each by different directors. It is the third and final installment overall in the titular film series, a follow-up film and spin-off to the first and second films.

== Plot ==
Unlike the first two films, ABC's of Death 2½ is composed of 26 "audition films" for the letter M. These films competed for the spot in ABCs of Death 2, with M is for Masticate being the winner. The 26 were chosen out of more than 500 entries, in alphabetical order.

== List of segments and directors ==
- M is for Magnetic Tape (directed by Tim Rutherford and Cody Kennedy): From Canada. A video store owner is accosted by ninjas and a crime lord and must call upon the powers of the VHS tapes to defeat them.

Cast: Mark Meer as Narrator/VHS God, Josh Lenner as Ninja Sensei, Kevin Martin as Videostore Guy, Charles Ghal as Big Boss, Tim Rutherford as VHS Warrior, Jeremy Kwan, Damian McDonald, Darryl Merpaw, Jesse Nash, Curt Engel, and Nolan Smits as Punk Ninjas

- M is for Maieusiophobia (The Fear of Giving Birth) (directed by Christopher Younes, sound design and music by Rami Abdou): From the United Kingdom. In this stop-motion short, a pregnant woman suffering from paranoia goes into labor and dies shortly after cutting the fetus out, with the baby's fate being left unknown.
- M is for Mailbox (directed by Dante Vescio and Rodrigo Gasparini): From Brazil. A young vampire attacks a house on Halloween by killing the mother and daughter upon them answering. Unfortunately for him, he finds out that the father is actually famed hunter Van Helsing.

Cast: Ênio Gonçalves as The Father, Fernanda Gonçalves as The Daughter, Inah de Carvalho as The Mother, Wallace Stuani as The Vampire

- M is for Make Believe (directed by Summer Johnson): From the United States. Two girls stumble upon a dead body and cover it in "fairy dust". Two men later arrive to the corpse at night to dig a grave and bury the body, and when the girls return in the morning, they find the body missing and believe it to have healed and disappeared.

Cast: Gillian Mathre as Purple Fairy, Natalie Mathre as Pink Fairy, Brett Stephens as Dead Man, Mark Popejoy and Mikey Taylor as The Two Men

- M is for Malnutrition (directed by Peter Czikrai): From Slovakia. A woman searches for food in a zombie-infested building.

Cast: Judit Bárdos, Michal Rovnák, Michal Kubovčík, Stanislava Vlčeková, Gabriela Marcinková, Peter Paulík, Róbert Poór, Jozef Koháry, Július Simlovič

- M is for Manure (directed by Michael Schwartz): From Canada. An abusive farmer threatens his son and is attacked by the reanimated corpse of his dead wife.

Cast: Myles Dobson as Boy, John Cianciolo as Father, Dani Barker as Victim, Brittnee Madden as Manure Monster

- M is for Marauder (directed by Steve Daniels): From the United States. A black and white parody of Mad Max on tricycles.

Cast: Emily Olyarchuk as Maxine, Wesley Braxton as Marauder Leader, Cole Krietemeyer as Meat Cleaver, John Wampler as Sling Shot, Reno Gooch as Ghetto Blaster, Grace Fennell as Red, Casey White as Scab, Kevin Byrd, Michael Fields, Lee Smith, and Molly McNutt as Extra Marauders

- M is for Mariachi (directed by Eric Pennycoff): From the United States. Two men go to a death metal concert located underneath a Mexican restaurant, but for the concertgoers, they get a surprise from the restaurant owners, who turn out to also be a mariachi band who go on a wild killing spree upon the concert.

Cast: Jeffrey Welk as Clay, James Nathn as Jay, Katie Hidalgo as Metal Punk, Ken Campbell as Lord Cock, Asphyxiating as Cock Strangler, Juan Bravo Jr., Enrique Garcia, and Alvaro Paulino Jr. as Mariachi Band

- M is for Marriage (directed by Todd E. Freeman): From the United States. A marriage councilor with supernatural powers helps a woman overcome her relationship with her husband before blowing her head up.

Cast: Jeffree Newman, Natalie Victoria, Michael Draper

- M is for Martyr (directed by Jeff Stewart): From the United States. A man is sacrificed by a group of townspeople using a variety of pain and torture methods.

Cast: Todd Jones as Martyr, Christopher Michael Jones as Preacher, Jensen Bucher as Wife, Kirk Ponton as Gentleman, Kevin Ridgeway as Lumberjack, Josh Christensen as Awkward Man, Connor Frame as Daughter, Shelby Friday as Firefly, Lawrence Greenberg as Cook, Nick Twist as Ladies Man, Holly Feehan, Meaghan Singletary, and John Beck as Townspeople

- M is for Matador (directed by Gigi Saul Guerrero): From Canada. A serial killer with a matador theme kidnaps and tortures women by having them wear a bull mask before his main victim kills him with the horns of a bull head.

Cast: Mathias Retamal as Matador, Olena Venidiktova as Girl, Karly Palmer and Emi Kamito as Victims

- M is for Meat (directed by Wolfgang Matzl): From Austria. In this stop-motion short set in a world populated with living meat people, a raw piece of meat devours a meat person at a fancy restaurant.

Cast: Arril Johnson (voice)

- M is for Mermaid (directed by Ama Lea): From the United States. Two fisherman catch a mermaid. One of them appears to fall for her and takes her home, only to kill and make a meal out of her for him and his friend.

Cast: Emma Julia Jacobs as Mermaid, Adrian Gaeta as Kyle, Dave Foy as Garrett, Berlyn Reisenauer, Gabby Grave, and Heather-Grace MacHale as Other Mermaids

- M is for Merry Christmas (directed by Joe and Lloyd Stas): From the United Kingdom. The Krampus decides to turn his life around and start killing people.

Cast: Lloyd Stas as Krampus, Paul Warren as Griffin, Beat Billson as Bret

- M is for Mess (directed by Carlos Faria): From Brazil. A man who defecates through his navel looks for a way to end it all. He gets that chance when he meets a cross-dressing man with coprophilia and, while he's asleep, cuts his stomach and lays it on the man.

Cast: Antonio Nogueira as Fat Man, Thor Medrado as Cross-dresser, Laise Leal as Girl

- M is for Messiah (directed by Nicholas Humphries): From the United States. A woman who is kidnapped by a cult kills their leader, which causes the other members to kill themselves.

Cast: Michelle Ferguson as The Sacrifice, Jason Vaisvila as The Messiah, Brandi-Lee Last, Julie Parrell, Shannon Gorst, Mark Gorst, Doug Stephen, Jenna Lillies, Joshua Collins, Natasha Collins, Joee Brassard Dejardins, Dakota Hare, Gillian Everard, and Nicholas Humphries as Cult Members

- M is for Mind Meld (directed by BC Glassberg): From the United States. A man who feels no pain subjects himself to torture, while a man in another room feels it all.

Cast: Clay Shirley as Subject 1, BC Glassberg as Subject 2, Andre Evrenos as Hands 1, Rory Harman as Hands 2

- M is for Miracle (directed by Álvaro Núñez): From Spain. A man discovers a box that turns dreary and terrible things into miracles, only to discover that his wife and daughter are being murdered by a man in a rabbit suit in real life.

Cast: David Blanka as Darío, Luz San Prudencio as Mireia, Patricia Saénz as Susana, Pako Henares as Rabbit Man

- M is for Mobile (directed by Barış Erdoğan): From Turkey. A man tortures his victim by receiving instructions via text message.

Cast: Ozan Ozkirmizi as Taner Tamer, Ali Arslan as İlker Arslan

- M is for Mom (directed by Carles Torrens): From the United States. A zombie child attempts to befriend a girl, only for the girl's mother to shoot him dead.

Cast: Mace Coronel, Brooke J. Ferrell, Kate Stewart

- M is for Moonstruck (directed by Travis Betz): From the United States. In a short that uses paper puppets, the relationship between a man and a woman is complicated by a scorned lover who tries to kill the man, only to end up captured by the creatures of the night.
- M is for Mormon Missionaries (directed by Peter Podgursky): From the United States. A woman is visited by two Mormon missionaries who seem all too eager to help. She is driven so mad by the two that she ends up killing them.

Cast: Cameron Dean as Edler Dean, Robert Guthrie as Edler Archibald, Carolyn Purdy-Gordon as Bonnie, Bud Watson as Bonnie's Husband

- M is for Mother (directed by Ryan Bosworth): From the United States. Two women are attacked by a giant spider.

Cast: Anastasia Baranova as Best Friend, Claire Scott as Emily

- M is for Muff (directed by Mia’Kate Russell): From Australia. An old man is suffocated to death by the dead body of an obese prostitute.

Cast: Don Bridges, Lulu McClatchy

- M is for Munging (directed by Jason Koch and Clint Kelly): From the United States. Two men dig up a corpse, then one of them performs cunnilingus on it, while the other jumps on the stomach and forces bodily fluids onto the first man's face.

Cast: Mark Sanders as The Jumper, Marc Field as Mungface, Nicolette Le Faye as Beautiful Corpse

- M is for Mutant (directed by Stuart Simpson): From Australia. A global outbreak causes bat-like creatures to erupt from people's mouths.

Cast: Glenn Maynard, Stephanie Elkington, Aston Elliot, Ben Mitchell, Sajithra Nithi, Matt Parkinson, Russell Robertson, Lucinda Cowden

== Filming and release ==
It is composed of the best selections from the 540 shorts submitted for the previous film, described as a "highlight reel of the next generation of horror filmmakers". It premiered at the inaugural Nightmares Film Festival on October 20, 2016 in Columbus, Ohio.
