= Giant Pictures =

American film distribution company

Giant Pictures LLC
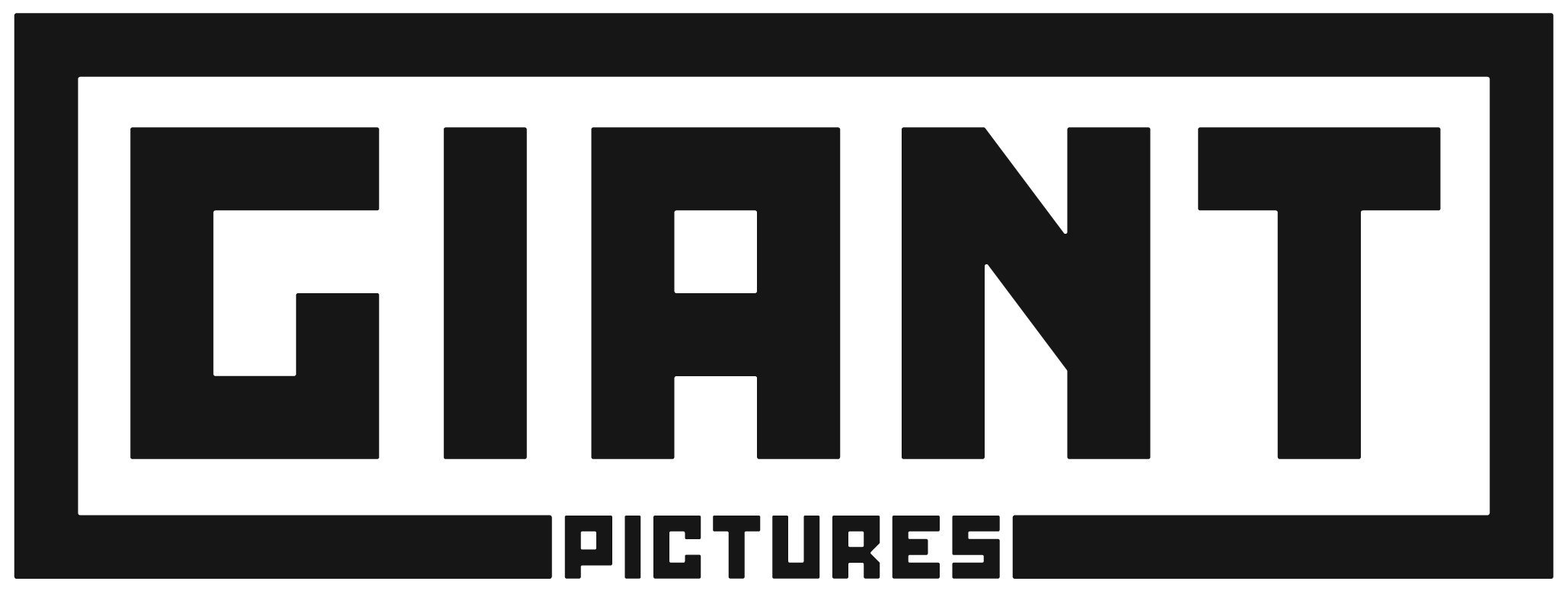
- Type: Private
- Industry: Motion pictures
- Founded: 2017
- Headquarters: New York, New York, United States; Burbank, California, United States
- Key people: Nick Savva (GM), Jeff Stabenau (co-founder)
- Services: Digital Distribution
- Subsidiaries: Drafthouse Films; Tribeca Films
- Website: Giant Pictures

Giant Pictures is an American independent film distribution company founded by Nick Savva and Jeff Stabenau with offices in New York City and Los Angeles. The company releases feature films, documentaries and series on streaming platforms, with an emphasis on flexibility and customization for filmmakers. Giant Pictures owns and operates specialty theatrical label, Drafthouse Films. Giant is the distribution and technology partner of the Tribeca Festival.

== History ==
Founded in New York City in 2017 by Nick Savva, who had previously worked in digital distribution for the Tribeca Festival, the company was initially launched under the name Streaming Plus. Its first film release was Newness directed by Drake Doremus, which the company had acquired following its world premiere at the 2017 Sundance Film Festival.

Initially a subsidiary of Giant Interactive, a technology services company owned by post production entrepreneur, Jeff Stabenau, Giant Pictures focused on distribution to streaming platforms including Apple TV, Fandango, Prime Video, Netflix, Tubi, The Roku Channel, Pluto TV and Peacock.

In 2020, in order to expand its global digital distribution efforts, Giant Pictures split from Giant Interactive, although the companies maintained a close relationship as technology partners. Subsequently, the company built various apps and channels on platforms such as The Roku Channel, XUMO, LG, Vizio and Plex. By 2022, Giant Pictures was releasing upwards of 40 new feature films annually and had more than 1,000 titles under management via content partnerships with numerous independent studios.

In February 2023, it was reported by Deadline.com that Giant Pictures had acquired American theatrical and VOD rights to A House Made Of Splinters, one of the 2023 Oscar nominees for Best Documentary Feature. Subsequently, Giant released the film on digital platforms including Apple TV and Prime Video. A theatrical release was announced at select Alamo Drafthouse theaters beginning in March 2023.

July 2026 saw the release of Mockbuster, which Giant co-released along with its studio partner, The Asylum. The film is a comedic, behind-the-scenes documentary exploring the balance between low-budget filmmaking and creative ambition.

== Drafthouse Films ==
Following a collaboration on the re-release of the cult 1980s genre movie Action USA, in early 2021 Giant Pictures signed a sales representation deal with Austin, Texas–based distribution label, Drafthouse Films, for the acclaimed films in its catalog. Subsequently, the Drafthouse titles were made available on multiple streaming platforms including Tubi, Kanopy, Shudder and Hulu. In March 2022, Giant Pictures acquired Drafthouse Films with Nick Savva serving as Drafthouse Films' new CEO and Alamo Drafthouse founder Tim League becoming chairman.

The first two films to be released by the newly acquired company were Nr. 10, directed by Alex Van Warmerdam and Masking Threshold, directed by Johannes Grenzfurthner. Both films had a close association with Alamo Drafthouse Cinemas and its related media companies, having premiered at Fantastic Fest then playing at Alamo Drafthouse locations, followed by streaming releases on the Alamo On Demand platform and through Giant Pictures.

== Partnership with Tribeca ==
In August 2021, Giant Pictures partnered with the Tribeca Festival to create The Tribeca Channel, a free, ad-supported movie streaming channel in the United States and Canada.

Ahead of the 30th anniversary of the movie A Bronx Tale in September 2023, Giant Pictures produced a 4K digital restoration of the film on behalf of Tribeca Enterprises. The digital coloring process was handled at Goldcrest Post in New York and was overseen personally by director, Robert De Niro. The restoration took 9 months to complete. To accompany the re-release of the film on UHD Blu-ray, Giant created bonus features including new interviews with De Niro, as well as writer and star, Chazz Palminteri. In June 2023, the Tribeca Festival, which De Niro founded along with the film's producer, Jane Rosenthal, premiered the 4K restored version with a special 30th anniversary screening at New York City's Beacon Theater.

In January 2024, Tribeca Enterprises and Giant Pictures partnered on an American distribution label called Tribeca Films, to manage the distribution of high-quality independent films from the film festival circuit on streaming platforms. The label aimed to focus on U.S. transactional video-on-demand (TVOD) and advertising-based video-on-demand (AVOD) with the opportunity for distribution across Giant Pictures’ streaming infrastructure, as well as on the Tribeca Channel. Tribeca Films set a goal of acquiring 25 titles per year from festivals like Sundance, Berlin, SXSW, Cannes, Toronto International Film Festival, as well as the Tribeca Festival. In March 2026, Tribeca Films announced a new round of acquisitions including Independent Spirit Award winner, Esta Isla.

== Content ==
=== Select filmography ===
Title	Year
Newness	2017
Time Trap	2018
White Boy	2018
Iron Fists and Kung Fu Kicks	2019
Stephen King's A Good Marriage	2019
Cabaret Maxime	2020
Dinner in America	2020
My Darling Vivian	2020
Volition	2020
Action USA	2021
A House Made of Splinters	2022
Nuclear Now	2022
Salt in My Soul	2022
A Bronx Tale (30th Anniversary Edition)	2023
A Disturbance in the Force	2023
Luther: Never Too Much	2024
Absolute Dominion	2025
Room on the Broom (Disc)	2025
The Gruffalo (Disc)	2025
Mockbuster	2026

=== Studio partners ===
- Concord Music Group
- Dogwoof
- Duplass Brothers Productions
- Baby Einstein
- Good Deed Entertainment
- Indican Pictures
- Live Nation Studios
- Magic Light Pictures
- Sony Music Vision
- The American Genre Film Archive
- The Asylum
- Vertigo Releasing
- Voltage Pictures
- ZDF Studios
