= Mockbuster (film) =

2025 Australian documentary film

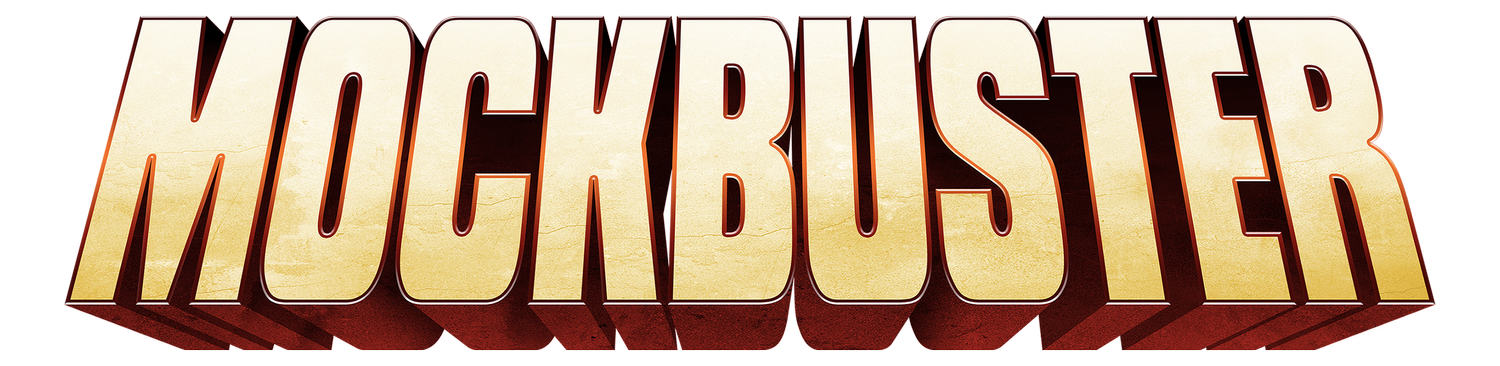
- logo
- Directed by: Anthony Frith
- Written by: Anthony Frith; Sandy Cameron
- Produced by: David Elliot-Jones; Sandy Cameron; Naomi Ball
- Cinematography: Maxx Corkindale
- Edited by: David Scarborough
- Music by: Bryony Marks
- Production companies: Screen Australia; South Australian Film Corporation; Adelaide Film Festival Investment Fund; Giant Pictures; VicScreen; Mostly True Media; Walking Fish
- Distributed by: Giant Pictures (worldwide); Umbrella Entertainment (Australia and New Zealand)
- Release date: October 24, 2025 (Adelaide Film Festival)
- Running time: 90 minutes
- Country: Australia
- Language: English

Mockbuster is a 2025 Australian documentary film directed by Anthony Frith. It is a behind-the-scenes look at Frith's experience of making a mockbuster film called The Land That Time Forgot for American studio The Asylum.

== Synopsis ==
Australian filmmaker Anthony Frith is contracted to American mockbuster film production studio and distributor The Asylum, known for their 2013 film Sharknado. He has to direct a film called The Land That Time Forgot, a "lost-world dinosaur epic" set in his hometown of Adelaide, South Australia, on a shoestring budget, and to be completed in six days. Mockbuster is a behind-the-scenes documentary showing Frith's progress through the making of the film.

== Cast ==
- Anthony Frith
- Brendan Petrizzo (producer at The Asylum)
- David Rimawi (co-founder and CEO of The Asylum)
- David Latt (co-founder and president of The Asylum)
- Paul Bales (filmmaker, co-founder and COO of The Asylum)
- Michael Pare (actor)
- Michelle Bauer (actress)
- Lauren Koopowitz
- Eric Roberts (actor)
- Eliza Roberts (actress)
- David Margetts

== Production ==
The film was presented at Marché du Film at Cannes Film Festival in April 2024, as part of "Adelaide goes to Cannes". The film is a "double-feature" directorial debut for Anthony Frith (who also works as a tutor with the University of South Australia), with the creation of The Land That Time Forgot along with Mockbuster. He said afterwards "I went into this project thinking that directing a dinosaur movie for The Asylum would be fun, and that it would make for a hilarious behind-the-scenes doc... started to see their true genius: controlled chaos".

Funding for Mockbuster was provided by Screen Australia, with the South Australian Film Corporation and the Adelaide Film Festival Investment Fund, in association with VicScreen. Additional funding was provided by KOJO Studios, Green Marble Productions, and Time Horse Productions. The film was co-written by Frith and Sandy Cameron (a UniSA lecturer in film and television), and produced by Cameron, David Elliot-Jones, and Naomi Ball, through Mostly True Media and Walking Fish Productions. Maxx Corkindale was responsible for the cinematography, Bryony Marks composed the score, and David Scarborough edited the film. Executive producers included New Zealand filmmaker David Farrier, Nick Savva (general manager of Giant Pictures), Madeleine Schumacher, Alex West, Ty Morse, Phil Laboon, Ari Harrison, and Cam Rogers.

== Release ==
Mockbuster had its world premiere at the 2025 Adelaide Film Festival on 24 October 2025 at the Piccadilly Cinema in North Adelaide. The Land That Time Forgot also got its premiere at the festival, screening at The Mercury on 26 October.

The film was acquired by American distribution company Giant Pictures for worldwide distribution, while Umbrella Entertainment has distribution rights for Australia and New Zealand. The film was be screened at various North American film festivals, before theatrical release in the US in late spring 2026.

== Reception ==
Mockbuster won the Feature Documentary Audience Award at the Adelaide Film Festival. Phil Hoad of The Guardian gave the documentary four stars out of five.
