= The Death of "Superman Lives": What Happened? =

2015 American documentary film

- Official release poster
- Directed by: Jon Schnepp
- Written by: Jon Schnepp
- Produced by: Holly Payne
- Starring: Nicolas Cage; Tim Burton; Kevin Smith
- Cinematography: Carl Millard King
- Edited by: Marie Jamora; Jon Schnepp
- Music by: Frederick William Scott
- Release dates: May 1, 2015 (premiere); July 9, 2015 (VOD)
- Running time: 104 minutes
- Country: United States
- Language: English

The Death of "Superman Lives": What Happened? is a 2015 American documentary film written and directed by Jon Schnepp and produced by Holly Payne. It chronicles the behind-the-scenes events surrounding the cancelled Tim Burton film Superman Lives. Funding for the documentary was partially raised through a successful Kickstarter campaign. It premiered on May 1, 2015 and was released through video on demand on July 9 the same year. While still available for purchase digitally, physical media releases are out of print following Schnepp’s passing in 2018.

== Synopsis ==
The documentary is a behind-the-scenes look at the 1996–98 pre-production of Superman Lives, an intended reboot of the Superman film series based on the 1992 DC comic The Death of Superman, that was cancelled only three weeks before filming was set to begin in April 1998. In the film, Schnepp interviews several people involved with the development of the project and features numerous conceptual artwork and designs intended for the visual look of Superman Lives.

=== Pre-production ===
Tim Burton was planned to direct the film and Jon Peters would produce it. Nicolas Cage was to star as Superman while Christopher Walken was rumoured to play Brainiac. Casting choices considered for Lois Lane were Courteney Cox and Sandra Bullock, although Peters stated that he wanted Bullock to play the character. Characters such as Lex Luthor and Doomsday were also planned to be included in the film.

=== Jon Peters' vision ===
According to writer Kevin Smith, Jon Peters did not want Superman to fly or wear his red and blue costume, and he wanted Superman to fight a giant spider for the finale. When Peters was questioned in an interview about it, he initially denied the claims, saying they were false, but later said that the giant spider finale was true and would have been an amazing sequence. Peters also stated that he wanted to make a Superman movie that had not been done before, and had chosen Nicolas Cage as Superman because he did not want someone "pink" and someone "for the street".

Peters would go on to produce Wild Wild West, which featured a giant mechanical spider in its finale.

== Interviews ==
Director Jon Schnepp interviews the following subjects in the film:

- Tim Burton, director
- Kevin Smith, writer
- Dan Gilroy, writer
- Jon Peters, producer
- Colleen Atwood, costume designer
- Lorenzo di Bonaventura, producer
- Wesley Strick, writer
- Nicolas Cage, actor (archive footage only)
- Charlie Oliver, interviewee

== Reception ==
Critical reception for The Death of "Superman Lives": What Happened? has been generally positive. The film holds a 79% rating on Rotten Tomatoes, based on 14 reviews, with an average of 7/10. Forbes and The Hollywood Reporter both wrote positive reviews, and The Hollywood Reporter commented that "fanboys will relish this overstuffed doc about the Superman movie that never hit the screen". IGN awarded it a score of 8 out of 10 saying: "But even if you come out of the documentary thankful the plug was pulled, the personalities involved and the story's [sic] they tell are worthwhile and offer some great insight into just what a struggle it can be when so many people try to work together to pull off a film of this scope".

== See also ==
- Look, Up in the Sky: The Amazing Story of Superman, a 2006 documentary about the history of Superman in comics, film, and television leading up to the release of Superman Returns.
- Jodorowsky's Dune, a 2013 documentary about Alejandro Jodorowsky's unproduced adaptation of Dune.
