= Come to Daddy (film) =

2019 film

- Theatrical release poster
- Directed by: Ant Timpson
- Written by: Toby Harvard
- Produced by: Mette-Marie Kongsved; Laura Tunstall; Toby Harvard; Daniel Bekerman; Emma Slade; Katie Holly
- Starring: Elijah Wood; Stephen McHattie; Michael Smiley; Madeleine Sami; Martin Donovan
- Cinematography: Daniel Katz
- Edited by: Dan Kircher
- Music by: Karl Steven
- Production companies: Tango Entertainment; New Zealand Film Commission; Nowhere; Blinder Films; Firefly Films; Scythia Films
- Distributed by: Saban Films
- Release dates: April 25, 2019 (Tribeca); February 7, 2020 (United States); February 20, 2020 (New Zealand); February 21, 2020 (Canada)
- Running time: 93 minutes
- Countries: Canada; Ireland; New Zealand; United States
- Language: English
- Box office: $117,974

Come to Daddy is a 2019 black comedy film directed by Ant Timpson and written by Toby Harvard.

== Plot ==
Norval Greenwood, a privileged musician who lives with his mother in a Beverly Hills mansion, receives a letter from his estranged father asking him to come and visit him. Norval, who has not seen his father since he was five years old, makes the trek to a secluded cabin overlooking the coast in Oregon. His father, Brian, is initially welcoming to him, but Norval's admission of a suicide attempt seems to anger Brian, who soon begins to display aggressive tendencies, taunting and insulting Norval, and even threatening him with physical violence. All this comes to a head one afternoon when Brian attacks Norval with a meat cleaver, but in the ensuing struggle, Brian has a heart attack and immediately dies.

Due to a lack of space at the local morgue, Norval is forced to keep his father's body in the cabin with him after having it embalmed. He attempts to stay in the house long enough for his mother to come and get him, but is repeatedly awakened by loud sounds from somewhere within the house. Finding a hidden family photo album, Norval sees a photo of his father and realizes that the dead man is not his father at all. He then finds a hidden hatch in the house leading to a bunker beneath, where he finds his real father bloodied and chained up. On his father's orders, he attempts to kill a man, Jethro, who arrives to torture his father, but Jethro escapes, promising revenge.

After finally freeing Brian, Norval is forced to carry him upstairs into the house. Brian reveals to Norval that after he left him and his mother, he fled to Bangkok where he and a group of three other men — Jethro, a large man named Dandy, and Gordon (the man who was pretending to be Norval's father) — kidnapped the daughter of the richest man in Thailand and successfully held her for a large ransom. Brian fled the group with their shares of the money and has been on the run ever since, funding Norval and his mother's expensive way of life with the money. Dandy arrives at the house and attempts to kill Norval, but Norval stabs him in the genitals multiple times with a barbecue fork, then suffocates him with plastic wrap before beating him to death with the rest of the roll.

Norval helps Brian leave the house, but Jethro returns, armed with a flaming crossbow. Upon finding Norval's luggage tag with his home address, Jethro loudly states his intention to drive to Los Angeles to kill Norval's mother as revenge. Brian advises Norval to hide in Jethro's trunk and kill him when he least expects it; Norval obliges, riding along to a motel where Jethro has arranged a meeting with a prostitute. While Jethro and the prostitute are engaged in a BDSM session, Norval steals the motel keys and a check spindle, slashes Jethro's tires, then attempts to sneak into Jethro's room through an adjoining room. Upon spotting him, the prostitute holds Norval in a headlock while Jethro stabs him several times with the spindle, then leaves. The prostitute is horrified that she's an accessory to Norval's death, but Norval stirs and exits the motel, finding Jethro has crashed his car into a sign that's partially decapitated him.

A dazed Jethro reveals to Norval that his mother was a prostitute who both Brian and Jethro slept with. Norval stabs Jethro in the exposed part of his brain with the check spindle; Jethro exhales "Arthur!" before collapsing dead. Norval, wounded but alive, walks on foot back to the house where he left his father and lies down next to him on the lakeside. Norval apologizes to his father for never letting his mother get over him and Brian weakly touches his son's hand.

== Cast ==
- Elijah Wood as Norval, the main character
- Martin Donovan as Brian
- Stephen McHattie as Gordon
- Michael Smiley as Jethro, Brian's former friend
- Simon Chin as Dandy, a hunchback
- Garfield Wilson as Ronald Plum, the sheriff
- Madeleine Sami as Gladys, the coroner
- Ona Grauer as Precious, a prostitute

== Release ==
The film had its world premiere at the Tribeca Film Festival on April 25, 2019. It was domestically released in theaters on February 7, 2020, worldwide on February 21, 2020 and on VOD by Lionsgate Home Entertainment on March 24, 2020.

== Reception ==
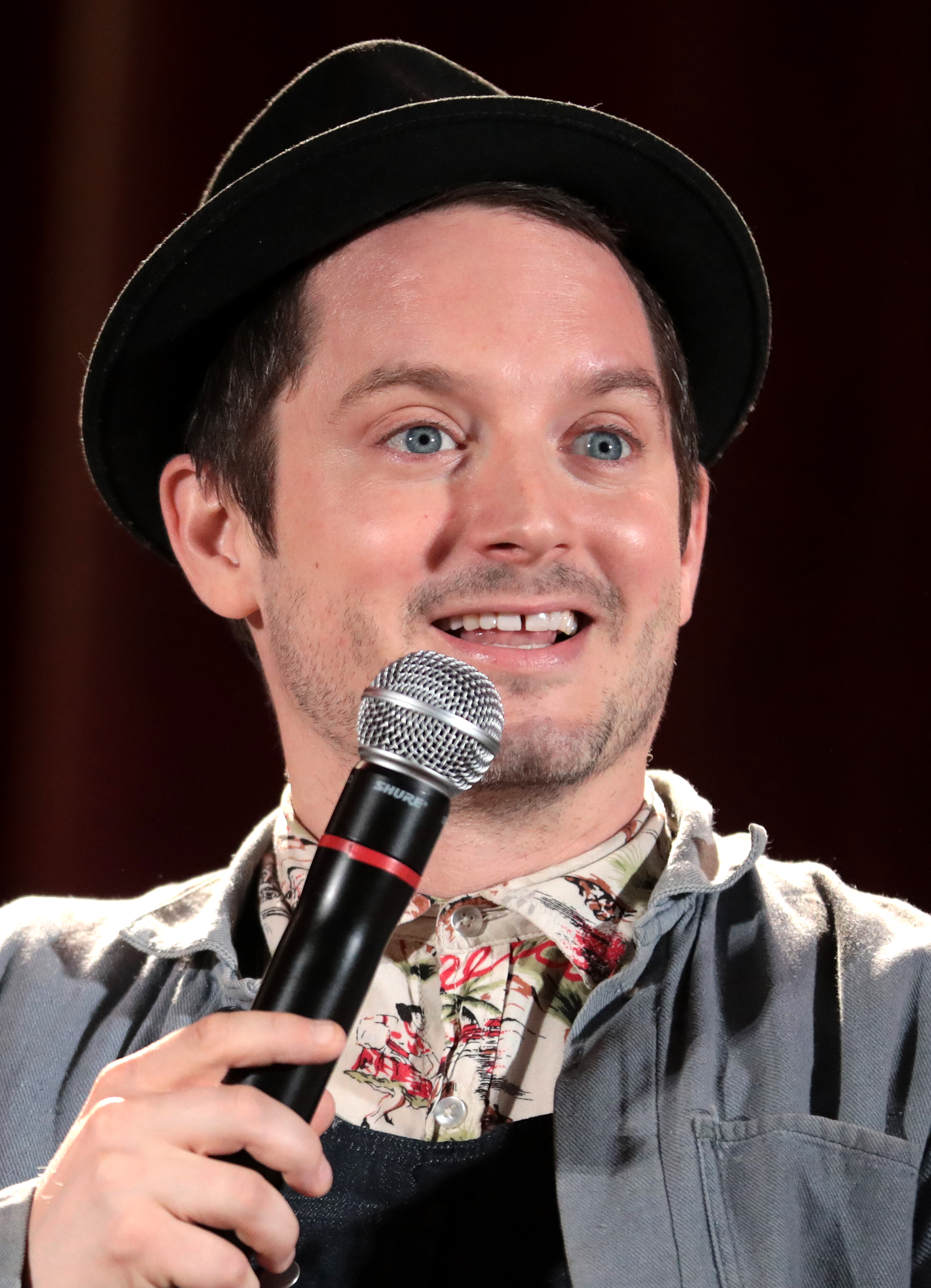
Elijah Wood (pictured) received praise for his performance.

=== Box office ===
Come to Daddy grossed $96,713 in North America, and earned an additional $21,262 from overseas territories for a total worldwide gross of $117,974, plus $1,290 with home video sales.

=== Critical response ===
On review aggregator Rotten Tomatoes, the film has an approval rating of 86%, based on 106 reviews, with an average rating of 7/10. The website's critics consensus reads, "Bloody horror with barbed wit, Come to Daddy anchors its brutal violence in a surprisingly mature approach to provocative themes." On Metacritic, the film has a weighted average score of 64 out of 100, based on 20 critics, indicating "generally favorable" reviews.
