= Lee Hardcastle =

British animator

- Occupations: YouTuber; Animator

YouTube information
- Years active: 2006–present
- Genres: comedy; Animation

Lee Hardcastle is a British clay animator known for adult animations and parodies produced since 2006 and published on YouTube. Other works include films produced for networks such as Adult Swim and Fox.

== Life and career ==
Hardcastle studied at the Northern Film School of Leeds Beckett University and started to release clay animations on YouTube in the mid-2000s. Hardcastle was selected as the 26th director of the 2011 film The ABCs of Death, to which he contributed the animated short T is for Toilet. He directed and animated the music video for the Kill the Noise song "Blvck Mvgic (Kill the Noise Pt. 2)". In 2012, Hardcastle released the animated short Pingu's The Thing to YouTube, a mashup of the clay-animated television series Pingu and the 1982 science fiction horror movie The Thing that quickly became viral on the platform and for which he was praised by The Thing director John Carpenter. The video was subsequently removed from Hardcastle's YouTube channel at the request of Pingu owners HIT Entertainment, to which Hardcastle reacted by uploading a shot-by-shot recreation of the video entitled Claycat's The Thing, featuring cats instead of penguins. Hardcastle lists the works of filmmakers Quentin Tarantino, Robert Rodriguez, Nick Park, Sam Raimi, the Brothers Quay, and David Lynch, as well as the animated series The Simpsons and Family Guy as major influences.

Hardcastle created a claymation scene of a horror film seen briefly on a television in the Smiling Friends episode "Curse of the Green Halloween Witch"; on 1 April 2026, Adult Swim premiered an extended version of the scene as an animated short—Ghosts 'n Chainsaws—as part of its annual April Fool's Day stunt.
