= The ABCs of Death =

2012 American film

- Theatrical release poster
- Directed by: Various directors
- Written by: Various writers
- Story by: Ant Timpson
- Produced by: Ant Timpson; Tim League
- Starring: Various actors
- Cinematography: Various cinematographers
- Edited by: Various editors
- Music by: Various composers
- Production companies: Drafthouse Films; Timpson Films
- Distributed by: Magnet Releasing
- Release dates: September 14, 2012 (TIFF); January 31, 2013 (VOD); March 8, 2013 (North America); July 20, 2013 (Japan)
- Running time: 124 minutes
- Country: United States
- Language: Various languages
- Box office: $21,832

The ABCs of Death is a 2012 American comedy horror anthology film produced by international producers and directed by filmmakers from around the world. The film contains 26 shorts, each by different directors spanning fifteen countries, including Nacho Vigalondo, Kaare Andrews, Adam Wingard, Simon Barrett, Banjong Pisanthanakun, Ben Wheatley, Lee Hardcastle, Noboru Iguchi, Ti West, and Angela Bettis.

It premiered at the Toronto International Film Festival in 2012. In 2013, it was released on VOD January 31 and in theaters March 8. The end credits of the film feature Australian band Skyhooks' 1974 song "Horror Movie". The film's financial success launched the titular film series, including a second film in 2014, and a spin-off film in 2016.

== Background ==
The film is divided into 26 individual chapters, each helmed by a different director assigned a letter of the alphabet. The directors were then given free rein in choosing a word to create a story involving death. The varieties of death range from accidents to murders.

A contest was held for the role of the 26th director. The winner was UK-based director Lee Hardcastle, who submitted the claymation short for T.

== Plot ==
The film begins showing a close up of a funnel with blood pouring ominously from it. The blood proceeds to fill up various rooms inside of a house before filling up the interior of a small room containing letter blocks. The room floods as the blocks float to the top spelling out the title. Throughout the film, the blocks spell out the titles to all the segments with each of the segments ending and beginning with a focus on, or a fade into, the color red.

| Title | written and directed by | Description |
|---|---|---|
| A is for Apocalypse | Nacho Vigalondo | From Spain. A woman bursts into the bedroom of a man, presumably her husband, and proceeds to stab, burn and beat him. Nearly dead, he asks why she did this; she then reveals she has been slowly poisoning him for some time as part of a murder plot, but has had to speed up the process because she has been "watching the news" and there "wasn't enough time". Destruction is heard outside as the woman sits with her husband and waits for the end of the world. Cast: Eva Llorach as Woman, Miguel Insua as Man |
| B is for Bigfoot | Adrian Garcia Bogliano | From Spain, shot in Mexico. Xochitl cannot go to sleep. Her babysitters, Dulce and Erik, fabricate a story about the Abominable Snowman coming out every night to take away kids, but only those who stay up at night. A mysterious homeless man breaks into the house and kills Dulce and Erik. The man enters Xochitl's room, but leaves as Xochitl hides under the covers, counting sheep. Cast: Alejandra Urdiaín as Dulce, Harold Torres as Erik, Greta Martínez as Xochitl, Pablo Guisa Koestinger as Yeti |
| C is for Cycle | Ernesto Diaz Espinoza | From Chile. Bruno sees a puddle of blood in his backyard, but ignores it. At night he hears a noise and checks on it, but finds nothing. In the morning, his wife Alicia disappears and he finds a hole in the bushes. He is sucked in and finds out he has been sent back in time to the night that he heard the sound; he was the one who made it. In the morning, he sees himself getting sucked into the bushes and is killed by another Bruno, making the puddle of blood seen at the beginning, initiating the chain of events that ended in him being killed as a causal loop. Cast: Matías Oviedo as Bruno, Juanita Ringeling as Alicia |
| D is for Dogfight | Marcel Sarmiento | From the United States. A man, adorned with a dog tag reading "Buddy", enters an underground fighting ring against a dog. The two have a vicious fight as various onlookers cheer them on. As the dog bites the man's neck, he shouts "Buddy!", causing the dog to stop. The dog suddenly turns on his handler, and lost dog posters are shown revealing that the dog previously belonged to the man. The dog and the man team up on the handler and presumably kill him. Cast: Steve Berens as The Fighter, Riley the Dog as The Dog, Chris Hampton as The Fighter's Trainer, George Marquez as The Dog's Trainer, Erik Audé as Beat Down Dude, Lisa Lynch as Card Girl, Imogen Mcaulay as The Baby, Eddie Griffith as The Goomba, Matt Bowler as Loopyloop, Joshua Diolosa as College Kid, JLouis Mills as The Hooligan, Luther Whang as The King of Dry Cleaning, Kelly Green as Roughstuff, Dee Ledbetter as Grandmema Bookie, Alex McAulay as Hippie, Elizabeth Mcaulay as Strungout, Dallas Malloy as Female Boxer, Terry Smith as Junior, Tere Beckman as Beauty, Mark Devine as The Walk In, Mark Miller-Summer as Another Bum, Rashidi Beck as Ganger Note: The credits note that the baby was filmed separately to avoid exposure to violence. |
| E is for Exterminate | Angela Bettis | From the United States. A man attempts to kill a spider, but keeps missing, getting bitten several times in the process. After a whole week of being stalked by the spider, and complaining about ear aches, the man finally kills the spider, but tiny baby spiders then hatch out of his ear. Cast: Brenden J. McVeigh as The Man, Faith Hanley as The Voice on the Phone |
| F is for Fart | Noboru Iguchi | From Japan. School girl Yoshie is obsessed with her teacher Miss Yumi. One day while outside, a deadly gas breaks forth from the ground and kills anyone who inhales it. Yoshie and Yumi escape into a building where the former wishes to smell the latter's farts instead of the gas. Yumi farts in Yoshie's face and she is transported to a gas-filled dimension where she and Yumi make out. Cast: Arisa Nakamura as Yoshie, Yui Murata as Miss Yumi, Hokaze Yamada as High School Girl A, Honoka Murakami as High School Girl B, Tomomi Sugai as High School Girl C |
| G is for Gravity | Andrew Traucki | From Australia. In the first short shot mostly from a POV perspective, a man drives up to the beach where he pulls out a surfboard and a bag full of bricks. Strapping the bag to himself, he rides the board out into the ocean, where he proceeds to drown. The camera changes perspective and the viewer sees the surfboard bobbing vertically in the water. Cast: Andrew Traucki as Surfer |
| H is for Hydro-Electric Diffusion | Thomas Malling | From Norway. In a WWII setting populated by humanoid animals, Bertie the Bulldog enters a strip club and is enamored by a fox woman. The fox turns out to be Bertie's Nazi nemesis Frau Scheisse, who traps him over an electrified pool of water. Encouraged by the voice of Winston Churchill, Bertie overcomes the odds and knocks Scheisse into the pool of water, where she melts and then explodes. He then winks and grins to the camera, in a parody of patriotic propaganda films. Cast: Martine Årnes Sørensen as Frau Scheisse (body), Ingrid Bolsø Berdal as Frau Scheisse (voice), Johannes Eilertsen as Bertie the Bulldog (body), Jon Øigarden as Bertie the Bulldog (voice), Mark Steiner as Announcer, Torgny Gerhard Aanderaa as Sir Winston Churchill |
| I is for Ingrown | Jorge Michel Grau | From Mexico. A man has his wife bound and gagged in his bathtub. As she struggles to break free, the man injects her with motor oil, which causes her to scratch herself violently. She bleeds and then vomits before lying lifelessly in the tub. As the scene goes on, a female voice: the woman in the tub, narrates in Spanish a monologue about how her husband's abuse just makes him a "primal" animal and not any more of a man, the monologue is directed at him. Cast: Adriana Paz as Woman, Octavio Michel as Man Note: In the credits, it is estimated that 2,015 women are abused in Mexico in the last 10 years, which is over 200 women a month. |
| J is for Jidai-geki (Samurai Movie) | Yûdai Yamaguchi | From Japan. An executioner prepares to decapitate a samurai; however, the samurai begins performing a series of bizarre and physically impossible facial expressions, causing the executioner to panic. A man off-screen tells the executioner to finish the job, as he notices that the samurai is performing seppuku. The executioner, who turns out to be a kaishakunin, beheads the samurai, but then laughs at the ridiculous expression that the head made after it landed on the floor. Cast: Daisuke Sasaki as Samurai, Takashi Nishina as Executioner |
| K is for Klutz | Anders Morgenthaler | From Denmark. In this cartoon short, a woman uses the toilet at a party, only to discover that her stool refuses to be flushed. The stool starts making squeaking noises as it moves on its own towards its "creator". After the woman seemingly manages to flush it, she continues to hear the squeak. As she inspects the toilet, the stool is revealed to be clinging to the ceiling above her; it drops down, re-entering her anus at high speed. She bolts upright, stunned, and then falls down dead, as the stool slides out her mouth on a stream of blood. Other party guests enter and find her body. Cast: Illunus Quezubec as Woman |
| L is for Libido | Timo Tjahjanto | From Indonesia. A man awakens naked and strapped to a chair, with another man in the same position. Both are forced to masturbate to a series of increasingly disturbing acts, with the last one to climax getting impaled. At one point, the woman overseeing the acts is accidentally impaled, along with the loser. The man who made it through all of the acts suddenly falls unconscious when he refuses to continue. He awakens in bed with a naked woman over him, only to discover he is part of the next act, as the woman kills him with a chainsaw. Cast: Paul Foster as Man, Kelly Tandiono as Eyes, Teguh Leo as Stage 1 Man, Gary M. Iskak as Stage 12 Man, Epy Kusnandar as Stage 13 Man, Gerrard Kamaru as Boy, Tjong Siat Lim as Rapist, Putri Sukardi as Epilogue Woman, Ozzy Dian as Epilogue Man, Cansirano as Epilogue Man, Patty Sandya as Handicapped Girl |
| M is for Miscarriage | Ti West | From the United States. A woman tries to unclog her toilet. She goes down to the basement, finds a plunger and returns, revealing that a dead fetus is inside. Cast: Tipper Newton as Baby Mama |
| N is for Nuptials | Banjong Pisanthanakun | From Thailand. Shane is flirting with his girlfriend Ann using a new parrot he bought. He then proposes to her and she accepts. Suddenly, Shane's parrot blurts out "Don't be scared Joy, my girlfriend won't know." Shane tries to brush it off, but the parrot's exclamations become more lewd and damning. Ann shouts "Damn you, Shane!", grabs a knife, and stabs him to death. Cast: Wiwat Kongrasri as Shane, Orn-Arnin Peerachakajornpatt as Ann |
| O is for Orgasm | Hélène Cattet and Bruno Forzani | From Belgium. A man and a woman, credited as "L'homme" and "La femme", respectively, have sex, which is presented in a series of abstract, dimly-lit, close-up shots, such as bubbles, cigarettes, leather, moaning and breathing. The short ends with the man pulling out a leather belt and strangling the woman as she lets out one final orgasm. Cast: Manon Beuchot as La femme, Xavier Magot as L'homme |
| P is for Pressure | Simon Rumley | From the United Kingdom, shot in Suriname. A prostitute must take care of her three children as her boyfriend, a reckless man himself, steals all of her saved-up money. Desperate, she takes up a gig at what appears to be a photo shoot. However, the man pulls out a small baby kitten that he gives to the prostitute, who promptly puts the kitten down and crushes it underneath her shoe. Afterwards, the prostitute is seen happily spending the day with her children. Cast: Yvanna Hilton as Mother, Chaira Sedney as Youngest Daughter, Shelissa Sedney as Middle Daughter, Chennevieve Huisden as Eldest Daughter, Valentino Sabajo as Boyfriend / Father, Imran Mohamedajoeb as The Crusher, Robby Nielo as Rentman; Note: The cat being stomped happened offscreen |
| Q is for Quack | Adam Wingard and Simon Barrett | From the United States. The actual filmmakers, playing themselves, are upset over having gotten the letter Q for their segment and, whilst struggling for ideas, decide to make theirs the only segment of the film to feature an actual on-screen death. Adam and Simon, along with their cameraman Juan Carlos, go out to shoot an actual living duck on film (since "nobody gives a shit about animals"). Adam and Simon's guns suddenly jam and then unexpectedly go off, killing the pair. Juan Carlos runs away, leaving the still-living duck in the cage to watch the strange scene. Cast: Adam Wingard as Himself, Simon Barrett as Himself, Liz Harvey as Melissa, Juan Carlos Bagnell as Himself, Quackers the Duck as Himself; Note: In the credits, there is a statement about Mr. Quackers, dedicating the film to him and other animals killed in snuff films. |
| R is for Removed | Srđan Spasojević (Note: Best known as the director of A Serbian Film.) | From Serbia. A man is continually subjected to constant surgeries, as his skin can produce full rolls of 35mm film. He is covered in bandages, but seemingly adored by the public who want to touch his skin. Eventually, his skin begins to produce less and less film and he escapes, killing several men in the process. He makes it to a train yard and crushes himself underneath one of the cars; shortly afterwards, it begins to rain blood. Cast: Slobodan Bestic as The Man, Ljubimir Todorovic as The Doctor, Marina Savic as The Nurse, Greg De Cuir as The Paramedic, Bojan Djordjevic as Black Suit 1, Vanja Lazin Barquero as Black Suit 2, Ivana Kovacevic as The Girl in the Cage |
| S is for Speed | Jake West | From the United Kingdom. Roxanne kidnaps Lulu from an abandoned outpost in the desert, while being chased by an invincible hooded figure. After putting Lulu in the trunk of her car, Roxanne speeds off, but runs out of gas. Roxanne attempts to bargain with the hooded man, but he refuses, admitting that she "gave [him] a run for [his] money". She takes his hand and is shown to have died in a drug den. Lulu wakes up, takes Roxanne's drugs and hallucinates the desert. Cast: Darenzia Elizabeth as Roxanne, Lucy Clements as Lulu, Peter Pedrero as Hooded Man |
| T is for Toilet | Lee Hardcastle | From the United Kingdom. In this claymation short, a child is being taught how to use the toilet by his parents. The toilet suddenly grows teeth and eyeballs and telepathically locks the door. It brutally kills and devours the child's parents before lunging at the child, revealing it all to be a nightmare. The child decides to use the toilet for real, but a loose screw frightens him, leading to him getting his head stuck in the toilet seat. His father laughs upon seeing him, but the toilet tank then comes loose and falls, crushing the child's head and causing the father to scream in horror. Cast: Kim Richardson as Mum (voice), Lee Hardcastle as Dad (voice); NOTE: This short spawned a sequel called Ghost Burger, where it is revealed that the child survived his injuries. |
| U is for Unearthed | Ben Wheatley | From the United Kingdom. In the second short shot entirely from a POV perspective, a vampire rises out of its coffin as a small mob attempts to sedate and kill it. The vampire flees from the mob, stopping to feed upon a passing woman, before being taken down by a flaming arrow and knocked unconscious. The vampire awakens as a prisoner of the mob, who have its teeth pulled, the vampire itself staked, and finally its head cut off as it stares at its killers. Cast: Neil Maskell as Lord Scanlon, Michael Smiley as Father Tom, Robin Hill as Geoff, Simon Smith as The Archer, Tilly Gaunt as Sue, Laurie Rose as The Creature |
| V is for Vagitus (The Cry of a Newborn Baby) | Kaare Andrews | From Canada. In New Vancouver, A.D. 2035, women must petition the government for permission to bear children. Lainey, an officer, successfully petitions for one, but discovers she is infertile. She and her robot partner, Nezbit, break into a facility to hunt for "mentals". They discover a family which Nezbit subsequently kills; he then beheads the family's baby. Lainey's boss, Stoker, enters and criticizes her, due to her sympathizing with the family. The baby's head turns out to be alive and possessing some psychic power, as it proceeds to blow up Stoker's head, while the dying father tells Lainey that she is its mother now. Cast: Kyra Zagorsky as Lainey, Fraser Corbett as Nezbit, Michael Rogers as Stoker, Daniel Bacon as Dr. White, Elisabeth Rosen as Mrs. Van Arrant, Patrick Currie as Mr. Van Arrant, Casey Andrews and Leo Dowd as Baby Casey, Seth Ranaweera as Tech Tonic, Johnson Phan as Tech Tronic, Jeremy Raymond as Tech Sonic; Note: This short started as an idea for a feature film. |
| W is for WTF! | Jon Schnepp | From the United States. Jon Schnepp is working on an animated short relating to the letter W when his friends and crew members tell him to come to the conference room to watch the news. The short begins to devolve into scenes involving zombie clowns, a puppet in Hell, chem trails, a warrior woman battling a giant walrus, and a flying baby monster, all while a newscaster chaotically spouts end-of-the-world babble. Jon's head is cut off and stabbed by a cartoon warlock as he shouts "What the fuck!?". Cast: Jon Schnepp as Himself, Tommy Blacha as Himself, Dink O'Neal as Reporter, Shannon Prynoski, Holly Payne, Darren Shaw, David C. Smith, Jody Schaeffer, Mac Kerman, and Chase Conley as Bystander Victims, Rannie Rodil as Nurse, B. Richard Jeffery as Old Man, Laya Bella as Warrior, Chris Prynoski as Face Dog, Cig Neutron, Alexis Diana, Tiffany Braun, Noel Belknap, Daniel Bigelow, Alyx Jolivet, Shiloe Swisher, Jareth Hill, Justin Ridge, and Josh Capp as Zombie Clowns |
| X is for XXL | Xavier Gens | From France. Gertrude, an overweight woman, wanders the streets of France as people everywhere taunt her size; she is haunted by images of thin, attractive women. She sadly gorges herself on food before deciding to finally do something about her weight. Using a variety of sharp objects, Gertrude proceeds to cut the fat off of her body. She walks out of the bathtub in a skeletal state and missing all her skin; she poses briefly and then bleeds to death. Cast: Sissi Duparc as Gertrude, Sarah Bonrepaux and Isabelle Jeannin as The Two Girls, Chems Dahmani and Rurik Sallé as The Bad Guys, Iván González as Bobo, Patrick Ligardes as The Man in the Underground, Yasmine Meddour as The Commercial Girl and Gertrude Without Skin |
| Y is for Youngbuck | Jason Eisener | From Canada. A pedophilic janitor teaches a young boy he has been watching from afar to hunt deer, and is then implied to sexually assault the boy. The janitor continues to watch all the boys play basketball and then licks up their sweat afterwards. The boy, haunted by his time with the janitor, appears in the gymnasium and kills him with the severed head of a deer. Cast: Tim Dunn as Janitor, Rylan Logan as Kid, Angus Earl, Cassius Morris, Caeley Haslam, Liam Delehaney, Maggie Turner, Shaelyn Delahunt, Jason Schwartz, Kelsey Haslam, Quinlan Haslam, Neve Matthews, Finn Sullivan-Ash, Kate Delehanty, Andrew Mercer, Jordan Paavoca, Griffin Whynacht, Emma Marehand, Jordan Mercer, Isaiah Logan, and Scott Cowan as The Other Kids; Note: Features the song "Vengeance" by the Australian Synthwave duo Power Glove. |
| Z is for Zetsumetsu (Extinction) | Yoshihiro Nishimura | From Japan. A mysterious man named Dr. Strangeluv is shown the "positive" aspects of American culture and how it relates to Japan. All throughout, imagery of rice and sushi, a topless woman with a Nazi hat and giant penis, and naked people with hats resembling bombs reading "Little Boy" are unapologetically shown throughout. Strangeluv stands up and shouts "My Emperor, it is standing!" as his penis rises exposed and fires rice. Cast: Seminosuke Murasugi as Dr. Strangeluv, Arata Yamanaka as Government Spokesperson, Hiroaki Murakami as Salaryman 1, Tsuyoshi Kazuno as Salaryman 2, Katsuyuki Miyake as Salaryman 3, Demo Tanaka as Salaryman 4, Kurumi Ochiai as Sazae-San, Je$$ica as Rice Woman, Hiroko Yashiki as Female Detective, Naoko Takahashi as Office Lady, Yoshio Komatsu as Man Shot in Head 1, Sadashi Matsubayashi as Man Shot in Head 2, Atsushi Hiroki as Man Shot in Head 3 |

== Reception ==
Rotten Tomatoes reports that 40% of critics gave the film a positive review and an average score of 4.9/10 based on 65 reviews. The consensus reads: "As often the case with anthology films, The ABCs of Death is wildly uneven, with several legitimately scary entries and a bunch more that miss the mark".

Nerdist calls it "a midnight movie for folks with a sick sense of humour". The Austin Chronicle says it "soars to such artistic heights, and such tasteless depths, on a global scale, no less, bodes well for the future of cinema fantastique and otherwise", while Inside Pulse says the movie has a "brilliant concept but not great execution". Many reviewers criticized the film shorts' unevenness. Dread Central gave a mixed review for the film, saying the film is "full of installments that are more bad than good" but that it was an "easy watch" overall. Film School Rejects gave The ABCs of Death a B rating, praising D is for Dogfight while saying that "M is for Miscarriage is almost insulting in its laziness". Screen Crush gave an overall positive review, saying that it was "a good time at the movies". Dave Canfield writing for film magazine Magill's Cinema Annual said of the film: "The ABCs of Death is for anyone who loves horror since it is easy to skip through segments that are not to taste. Any viewer should be prepared to laugh pretty hard; feel tense; get grossed out like they would at any halfway decent horror film. But that same viewer now has a chance to find out about some of the best directors working in horror today".

== Sheila Kearns case ==
After showing the film to a group of high school Spanish students, former Ohio substitute teacher Sheila Kearns was found guilty of four counts of disseminating matter harmful to juveniles. Kearns was convicted, and on March 5, 2015, she was sentenced to 90 days in jail and probation for three years.
