= Jon Schnepp =

American filmmaker

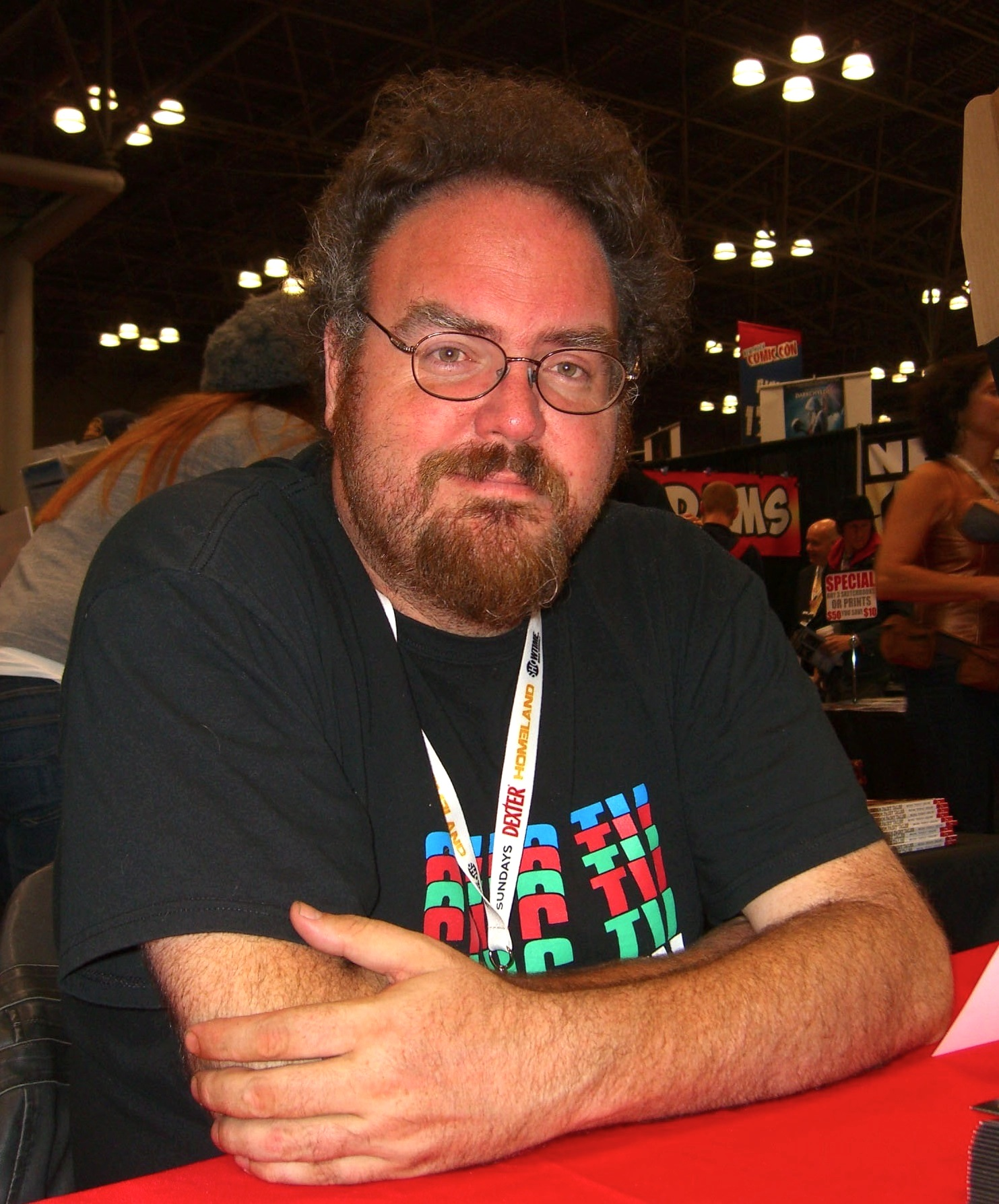
- Schnepp at the 2012 New York Comic Con
- Born: Jonathan David Schnepp; May 16, 1967; West Haven, Connecticut, United States
- Died: July 19, 2018 (aged 51); Los Angeles, California, U.S.
- Education: School of the Art Institute of Chicago (BFA)
- Occupations: animator, producer, director, editor, writer, voice actor, media host
- Years active: 1986–2018
- Partner: Holly Payne

Jonathan David Schnepp (May 16, 1967 – July 19, 2018) was an American animator, producer, director, writer, editor, voice actor, and media host.

Schnepp was known for the documentary film The Death of "Superman Lives": What Happened?, which he directed and wrote. He also directed episodes of Metalocalypse, The Venture Bros. and a segment of The ABCs of Death. He was also known for his work with Collider, appearing regularly as a panelist on the site's Collider Movie Talk, Collider Nightmares, and Collider Heroes series, the latter of which he hosted. His company, Schneppzone, works on short films and television series.

Schnepp died on July 19, 2018, due to complications following a stroke.

== Career ==
Schnepp served as animation director for Nickelodeon's What's Inside Heidi's Head?, and as editor on numerous episodes of Cartoon Network's Space Ghost Coast to Coast. He co-directed the pilot for Upright Citizens Brigade for Comedy Central, and directed segments and the title sequence for the series run. He also released The Removers and Brainwarp, two pilots he produced and directed, on DVD by Film Threat. He then went to Brazil, working with Debbie Allen, editing and creating the title sequences for two sitcoms airing in São Paulo and Rio de Janeiro. Schnepp co-created, co-wrote, and directed Nerd Hunter 3004 for the Channel 101 pilot. He also guest stars as a voice actor on three episodes of Aqua Teen Hunger Force. In two episodes he voices the Wisdom Cube and in the other he plays The Creature from Plaque Lagoon.

From 2006 to 2012, Schnepp served as director on Metalocalypse, an animated series on Cartoon Network about Dethklok, a chiefly-fictional heavy metal band. As well as directing several episodes per season (the most recent of which aired in 2012), he designed and created the look of the five band members, and works closely with the show's co-creators/writers Brendon Small and Tommy Blacha. He directed the 2009 Dethklok Tour with Mastodon, providing an animated accompaniment. Schnepp helped write all four Dethklok comic books, and designed variant cover arts.

Schnepp co-directed Season 4.1 of The Venture Bros. Schnepp was featured in The Damned Things' music video for "We've Got a Situation Here".

In 2011, Schnepp directed music videos for the bands I Set My Friends on Fire and Forbidden. In a 2012 Dread Central interview, he spoke of directing an upcoming animated horror film Grimm Fairy Tales.

From 2012 to 2015, Schnepp was a regular contributor to AMC Movie Talk on YouTube, an online show dedicated to film news and commentaries. After the series' cancellation by AMC Theatres and subsequent pickup by Collider, Schnepp remained as a regular contributor.

In 2015, Schnepp directed the documentary film The Death of "Superman Lives": What Happened?, which documents behind-the-scenes events surrounding the cancelled Tim Burton film Superman Lives. Partially raised through a successful Kickstarter campaign, it premiered on May 1, 2015, and was released through VOD on July 9, 2015, to positive reviews.

== Death ==
On July 12, 2018, Schnepp suffered a stroke that left him unconscious and on life support. He died of complications a week later on July 19, aged 51.

== Selected filmography ==
=== Film, television, and web ===
Year	Film	Director	Producer	Writer	Actor	Other credits and notes
1986	Ferris Bueller's Day Off				Yes	Extra
1995–99	Space Ghost Coast to Coast				Yes	Animator, voice role (C. Ling Tile), editor
1995	HorrorGirl				Yes	The Demon
1995	Club Dead				Yes	Video game; voice role
1998	Upright Citizens Brigade	Yes				Two episodes
1999	Cast in Stone	Yes				
2000	HBO First Look					Editor
2001	The Removers	Yes	Yes	Yes		Short film
2003	The Orlando Jones Show					Editor
2003	Brainwarp	Yes	Yes		Yes	Role: The Indescribable Disaster (voice)
2003–09	Aqua Teen Hunger Force			Yes	Yes	Role: The Wisdom Cube / Gary the Dairy Fairy (voices)
2004	Nerd Hunter 3004	Yes	Yes	Yes	Yes	Short film; role: Videogame Nerd
2005	My Big Fat Independent Movie				Yes	Role: Mexican Standoff Extra
2005–06	Mind of Mencia					Visual effects
2006–12	Metalocalypse	Yes	Yes		Yes	Character designer; role: Dr. Gibbits (voice); Animated series
2007	Aqua Teen Hunger Force Zombie Ninja Pro-Am				Yes	Video game; role: Dumbassahedratron (voice)
2009	A Day in the Life				Yes	Editor; role: Officer Miller
2009–10	The Venture Bros.	Yes				Animated series Co-directed with Christopher McCulloch
2010	Caller ID				Yes	Role: Jeb
2010	Black Panther	Yes				Co-created with Mark Brooks
2011	Comic-Con Episode IV: A Fan's Hope					Guest appearance only
2011	Underworld: Endless War			Yes		
2012	The ABCs of Death	Yes		Yes		Segment "W is for WTF?"
2012–15	AMC Movie Talk					Himself (panelist)
2014	Turbo Fast				Yes	Role: Donald (voice); Episode: "Tur-Bros/The Snailman"
2015	The Death of "Superman Lives": What Happened?	Yes	Yes	Yes		Editor; Himself; Documentary
2015	Wrestling Isn't Wrestling				Yes	Short film; role: Rabbi
2015	AMC Heroes					Himself (host)
2015–18	Collider Movie Talk					Himself (panelist)
2015–18	Collider Heroes					Himself (host)
2016	Nerdland					Sequence animator
2018	Temple of Art		Yes			Documentary

=== Music videos ===
Year	Artist	Song	Notes
1991	Infectious Grooves	"Therapy"	Extra
1992	Iron Maiden	"Be Quick or Be Dead"	Extra
1994	Melvins	"Revolve"	Extra
1997	Metallica	"The Memory Remains"	Extra
2007	Dethklok	"Bloodrocuted"	Co-director (with Brendon Small)
2007	Exodus	"Riot Act"	Director
2008	Dethklok	"Murmaider"	Director
2008	Dethklok	"Briefcase Full of Guts"	Director
2008	Dethklok	"Birthday Dethday"	Director
2008	Dethklok	"Duncan Hills Coffee Jingle"	Director
2008	Dethklok	"Hatredcopter"	Director
2008	Dethklok	"Thunderhorse"	Director
2008	Dethklok	"Go Into the Water"	Director
2009	Dethklok	"Bloodlines"	Director
2009	Dethklok	"Dethsupport"	Director
2009	Dethklok	"The Gears"	Director
2009	Dethklok	"Burn The Earth"	Director
2009	Dethklok	"Black Fire Upon Us"	Director
2010	Exodus	"Downfall"	Director
2010	The Damned Things	"We've Got a Situation Here"	Guest appearance only
2011	I Set My Friends on Fire	"Astral Rejection"	Director
2011	Forbidden	"Omega Wave"	Director
