= Ant Timpson =

New Zealand film producer

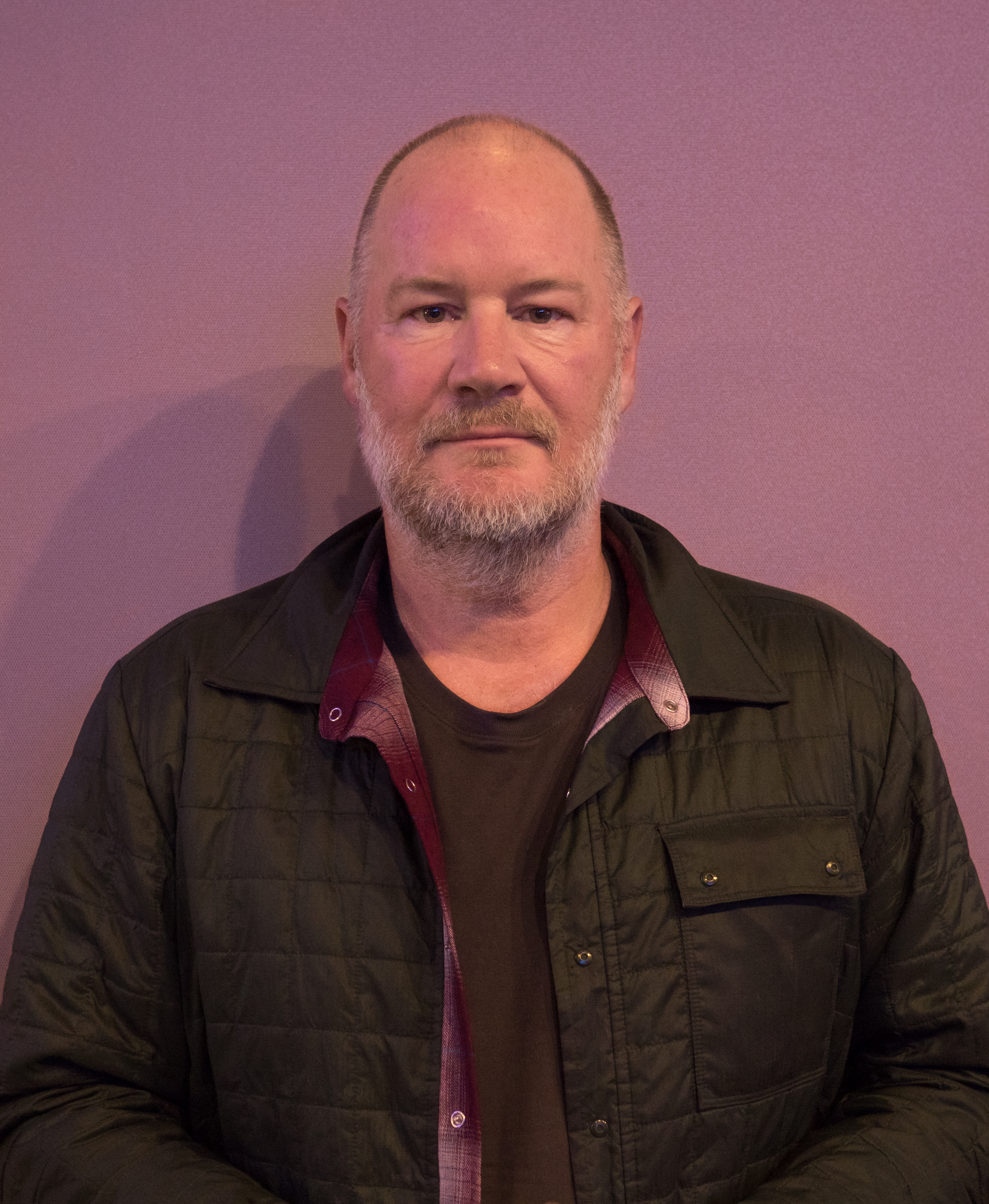
- Timpson at the Tribeca Film Festival premiere of Come to Daddy in 2019
- Born: 21 April 1966 (age 60); New Zealand
- Occupation: Producer
- Years active: 1994–present

Ant Timpson (born 21 April 1966) is a New Zealand film producer and director, best known for producing The ABCs of Death series, Turbo Kid, Deathgasm and The Greasy Strangler. He founded and hosts the 48Hours film contest.

== Career ==
In 2003, Timpson founded the annual 48Hours film challenge, a New Zealand-based competition where teams of filmmakers create a short film in 48 hours. Taika Waititi and Te Radar won in the festival's first year.

The film Turbo Kid originated as a submission for the "T" segment in ABCs of Death. Though not selected, Timpson was impressed and approached the filmmakers to expand it into a feature. Timpson got Elijah Wood and his production company, SpectreVision, involved in producing The Greasy Strangler.

In 2016, he won the British Independent Film Awards Discovery Award. Also in 2016, he won a Saturn Award for Best International Film.

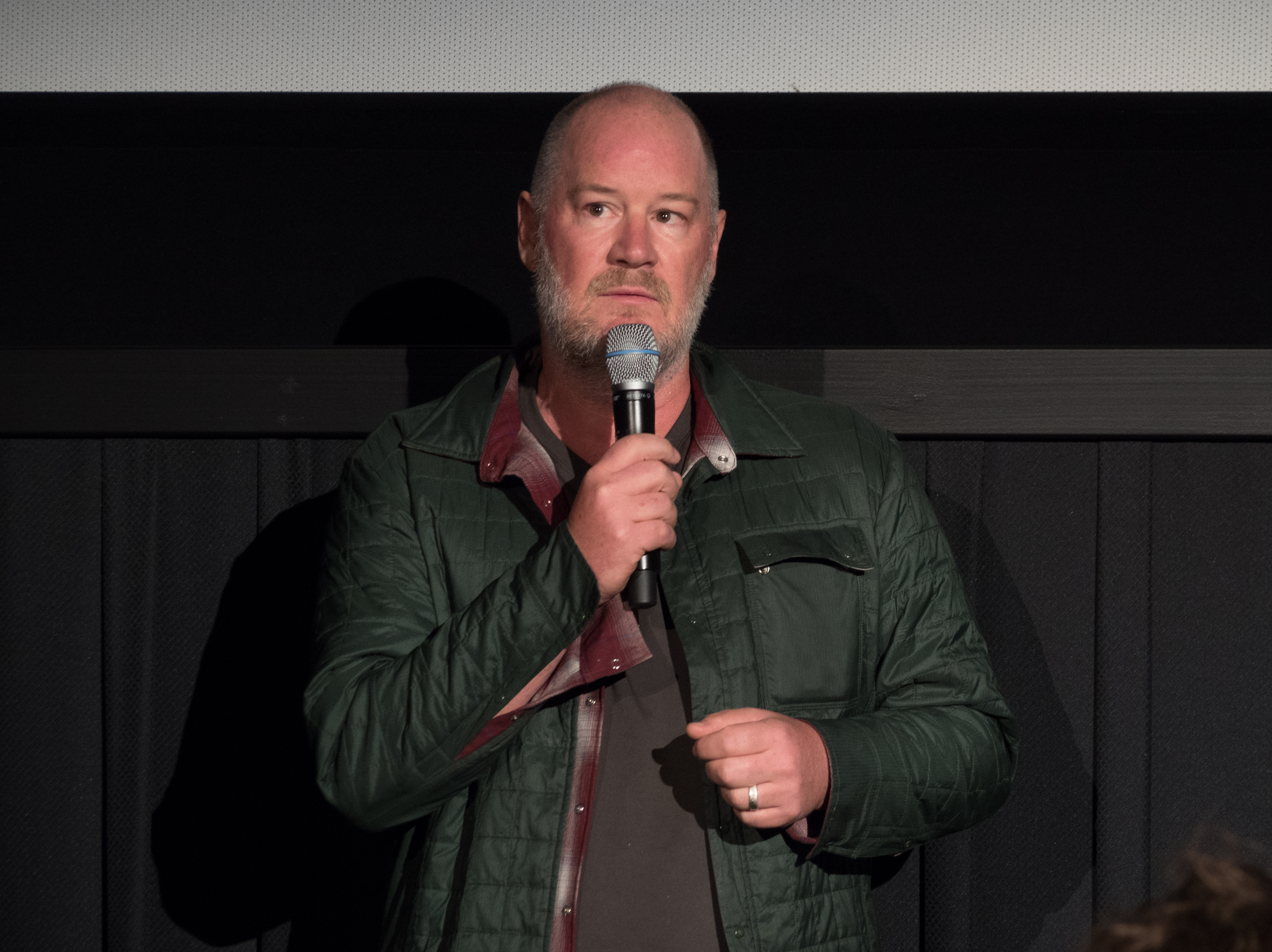
Timpson before the premiere of Come to Daddy at the Tribeca Film festival in 2019

In January 2017, it was announced Timpson would produce a new horror anthology, The Field Guide to Evil, consisting of eight directors, each from a different nation. The crowdfunded project is unique in that it will allow backers the opportunity to have equity investment.

In 2019, his debut feature film Come to Daddy premiered at the Tribeca Film Festival. The film has a score of 86% on Rotten Tomatoes.

His 2024 film Bookworm premiered as the opening film of the 28th Fantasia International Film Festival, where it subsequently won the Audience Award: Gold for Best International Feature.

== Personal life ==
Timpson grew up in Auckland and briefly studied at University of Otago with the intention of becoming a lawyer before dropping out.

Timpson believes censorship systems are archaic and started a fundraiser for a teacher who was fired for showing The ABCs of Death in her class.

He owns the biggest private collection of 35mm films in the Southern Hemisphere.
