= Tim League =

American film producer

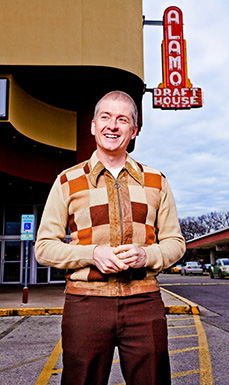
- League in 2012
- Born: 1969 or 1970 (age 55–56); United States
- Alma mater: Rice University
- Occupations: Theatre owner, film producer
- Employers: Alamo Drafthouse Cinema; Drafthouse Films

Timothy Allen League is an American entrepreneur and film producer based in Austin, Texas. He is the founder of the Alamo Drafthouse Cinema chain and the founder of Drafthouse Films, a film distribution company, where he produced The ABCs of Death and other films He is co-founder of Fantastic Fest, a film festival, Mondo, an entertainment merchandise company, and Neon, a film production and distribution company.

== Early life and education ==
League graduated from Rice University in 1992 with degrees in mechanical engineering and art history. While at Rice, he was detained by campus police for interrupting a campus event while dressed as a banana.

== Career ==
After a two-year stint at Shell Oil Company in Bakersfield, California, he left the engineering profession and opened up his first movie theater. An unmitigated financial disaster, the Tejon theater closed in 1995, and he loaded a truck with 200 seats, a projector, screen, and speakers, and relocated to Austin, Texas, where he launched Alamo Drafthouse Cinema, where he remained as CEO until 2020 when he was replaced by Shelli Taylor. He took up the new position as executive chairman of the board.

Asked about his motivation to open a movie theater in 2012, League said, "What we set out to do in the very beginning was to make a movie theater by fans for fans. And we got into the business because we love movies and we got a little frustrated with our options as to what the movie theater experience was all about".

League founded the Rolling Roadshow, which takes classic films around the country to project them at the sites they were set in.

In 2004, League co-founded entertainment merchandiser Mondo to produce and distribute limited-edition poster art, t-shirts, toys, and vinyl record soundtracks.

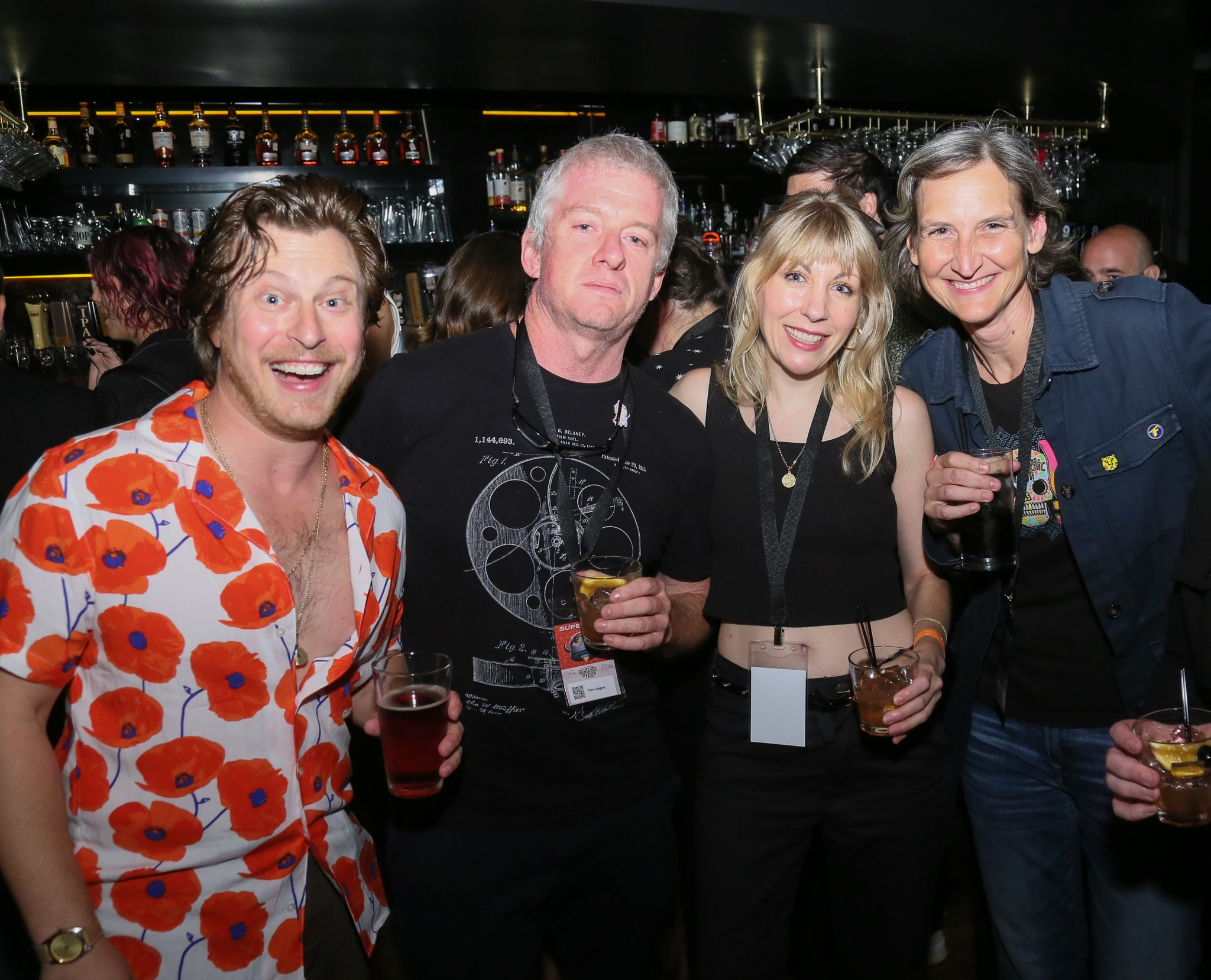
League with Noah Segan, Annick Mahnert and Lisa Dreyer at Fantastic Fest in 2022

In 2005, League, Harry Knowles, Paul Alvarado-Dykstra, and Tim McCanlies co-founded Fantastic Fest, the largest genre film festival in the United States. Held annually at the Alamo Drafthouse South Lamar in Austin, Texas, the festival focuses on such genres as horror, science fiction, fantasy, action, Asian, and cult. In 2007, Variety publisher Charles Koones included Fantastic Fest as one of "ten festivals we love". In 2008, MovieMaker magazine named Fantastic Fest "one of the 25 film festivals worth the entry fee".

The 2017 festival attracted attention when it was disclosed that League had rehired Devin Faraci as a writer even though Faraci had resigned from Birth.Movies.Death in 2016 after being accused of sexual assault. Faraci's rehiring prompted the resignation of Todd Brown, Fantastic Fest's director of international programming. Fantastic Fest subsequently severed ties with Harry Knowles after sexual harassment and assault allegations were levied against him. Alamo Drafthouse nevertheless proceeded with plans to show a previously unreleased pornographic film by Ed Wood.

== Drafthouse Films ==
In 2010, League founded the film distribution and production company known as Drafthouse Films.

== Neon ==
In 2017, League co-founded distribution and production company Neon (stylized as "NEON") with entertainment executive Tom Quinn. Neon's films, including Parasite and I, Tonya, have won several Academy Awards.

== Controversies ==
=== Sexual harassment foreknowledge ===
In 2017, concurrent with the revelations regarding Devin Faraci and Harry Knowles's harassment of women, former Alamo Drafthouse employees alleged that they had complained to League and his wife Karrie about Knowles in previous years. They were told simply to "avoid" Knowles. These purported incidents go as far back as 2000.

In late September 2017, League issued a statement apologizing on his and Karrie's behalf "To the women we have let down...".

=== Baker Center ownership ===
The League couple purchased the Baker Center in 2017, after it was put up for auction by Austin ISD. The Leagues and Alamo Drafthouse faced backlash from the local community over their purchase of the building, in spite of other bidders bidding much more at auction, and for their unfulfilled promise to build affordable housing on the property.

In 2020, The Leagues would seek NRHP status for the Baker Center. The local neighborhood association Friends of Hyde Park opposed the NHRP designation as the associated rezoning of the Baker Center would drastically reduce the amount of property taxes the Leagues would pay.

The Historical Landmark Commission voted in favour of rezoning the Baker Center in 2020, and the Baker Center was added to the NRHP on October 27, 2023.
