= List of Metalocalypse episodes =

This is a list of episodes for the American animated television series Metalocalypse, which was formerly aired on Adult Swim. The series is produced by Williams Street Studios and animated by Titmouse, Inc.

Metalocalypse made its Adult Swim Video debut on August 4, 2006, with its television debut two days later. The release date for the Season One DVD in the United States was October 2, 2007, one week after the release of The Dethalbum. The Metalocalypse Season One DVD was also released in DVD Region 4, on December 5, 2007. Season Two began September 23, two days prior to the release of The Dethalbum (the deluxe edition of which features the first episode of Season Two). On December 2, 2008, Season Two was released on DVD. On November 9, 2010, Season Three was released on DVD and Blu-ray. The Season Four DVD/Blu-ray was released on October 30, 2012. On October 27, 2013, a one-hour rock-opera special premiered on Adult Swim, entitled Metalocalypse: The Doomstar Requiem.

A total of 62 episodes of Metalocalypse aired, concluding the series.

== Series overview ==
Season	Episodes	Originally released	
Season	Episodes	First released	Last released
1	20	August 6, 2006	December 17, 2006
2	19	September 23, 2007	September 7, 2008
3	10	November 8, 2009	October 24, 2010
4	12	April 29, 2012	July 15, 2012
Special		October 27, 2013	

== Episodes ==
=== Season 1 (2006) ===
No. overall	No. in season	Title	Directed by	Written by	Original release date	Prod. code
1	1	"The Curse of Dethklok"	Jon Schnepp	Tommy Blacha & Brendon Small	August 6, 2006	101
2	2	"Dethwater"	Jon Schnepp	Tommy Blacha & Brendon Small	August 13, 2006	102
3	3	"Birthdayface"	Jon Schnepp	Tommy Blacha & Brendon Small	August 20, 2006	103
4	4	"Dethtroll"	Chris Prynoski	Tommy Blacha & Brendon Small	August 27, 2006	104
5	5	"Dethkomedy"	Jon Schnepp	Tommy Blacha & Brendon Small	September 3, 2006	105
6	6	"Dethfam"	Jon Schnepp	Tommy Blacha & Brendon Small	September 10, 2006	106
7	7	"PerformanceKlok"	Chris Prynoski	Tommy Blacha & Brendon Small	September 17, 2006	107
8	8	"Snakes n' Barrels"	Jon Schnepp	Tommy Blacha & Brendon Small	September 24, 2006	108
9	9	"Mordland"	Jon Schnepp	Tommy Blacha & Brendon Small	October 1, 2006	109
10	10	"Fat Kid at the Detharmonic"	Chris Prynoski	Tommy Blacha & Brendon Small	October 8, 2006	110
11	11	"Skwisklok"	Jon Schnepp	Tommy Blacha & Brendon Small	October 15, 2006	111
12	12	"Murdering Outside the Box"	Jon Schnepp	Tommy Blacha & Brendon Small	October 22, 2006	112
13	13	"Go Forth and Die"	Chris Prynoski	Tommy Blacha & Brendon Small	October 29, 2006	113
14	14	"Bluesklok"	Jon Schnepp	Tommy Blacha & Brendon Small	November 5, 2006	114
15	15	"Religionklok"	Chris Prynoski	Tommy Blacha & Brendon Small	November 12, 2006	115
16	16	"Dethkids"	John Schnepp	Tommy Blacha & Brendon Small	November 19, 2006	116
17	17	"Dethclown"	Chris Prynoski	Tommy Blacha & Brendon Small	November 26, 2006	117
18	18	"Girlfriendklok"	Brendon Small	Tommy Blacha & Brendon Small	December 3, 2006	118
19	19	"Dethstars"	Tommy Blacha	Tommy Blacha & Brendon Small	December 10, 2006	119
20	20	"The Metalocalypse Has Begun"	Jon Schnepp & Chris Prynoski	Tommy Blacha & Brendon Small	December 17, 2006	120

=== Season 2 (2007–2008) ===
No. overall	No. in season	Title	Directed by	Written by	Original release date	Prod. code
21	1	"Dethecution"	Jon Schnepp & Chris Prynoski	Tommy Blacha & Brendon Small	September 23, 2007	201
22	2	"Dethlessons"	Jon Schnepp	Tommy Blacha & Brendon Small	September 30, 2007	202
23	3	"Dethvengeance"	Jon Schnepp	Tommy Blacha & Brendon Small	October 7, 2007	203
24	4	"Dethdoubles"	Chris Prynoski	Tommy Blacha & Brendon Small	November 4, 2007	204
25	5	"Fashionklok"	Jon Schnepp	Tommy Blacha & Brendon Small	November 11, 2007	205
26	6	"Cleanzo"	Jon Schnepp	Tommy Blacha & Brendon Small	November 18, 2007	206
27	7	"Dethwedding"	Chris Prynoski	Tommy Blacha & Brendon Small	April 1, 2008	208
28	8	"P.R. Pickles"	Jon Schnepp	Tommy Blacha, Brendon Small & Bill Braudis	May 25, 2008	207
29	9	"Dethcarraldo"	Jon Schnepp	Tommy Blacha & Brendon Small	June 1, 2008	209
30	10	"Dethgov"	Tommy Blacha & Chris Prynoski	Tommy Blacha & Brendon Small	June 8, 2008	210
31	11	"Dethrace"	Jon Schnepp	Tommy Blacha & Brendon Small	June 15, 2008	211
32	12	"The Revengencers"	Jon Schnepp	Tommy Blacha & Brendon Small	June 22, 2008	212
33	13	"Klokblocked"	Mark Brooks	Tommy Blacha & Brendon Small	June 29, 2008	213
34	14	"Dethsources"	Jon Schnepp	Tommy Blacha & Brendon Small	July 6, 2008	214
35	15	"Dethdad"	Mark Brooks	Tommy Blacha & Brendon Small	July 13, 2008	215
36 37	16 17	"Snakes n' Barrels II"	Jon Schnepp	Tommy Blacha & Brendon Small	August 24, 2008	216; 217
38	18	"Dethrecord"	Mark Brooks & Jon Schnepp	Tommy Blacha & Brendon Small	August 31, 2008	218
39	19	"Dethrelease"	Jon Schnepp & Chris Prynoski	Tommy Blacha & Brendon Small	September 7, 2008	219

=== Season 3 (2009–2010) ===
No. overall	No. in season	Title	Directed by	Written by	Original release date	Prod. code
40	1	"Renovationklok"	Jon Schnepp	Brendon Small	November 8, 2009	301
41	2	"Tributeklok"	Jon Schnepp & Mark Brooks	Brendon Small & Mark Rivers	November 15, 2009	302
42	3	"Dethhealth"	Jon Schnepp	Brendon Small & Kristofor Brown	November 22, 2009	303
43	4	"Dethmas"	Mark Brooks	Brendon Small & Janine DiTullio	December 6, 2009	304
44	5	"Fatherklok"	Jon Schnepp	Story by : Brendon Small & Brian Posehn; Teleplay by : Brendon Small	December 13, 2009	305
45	6	"Fertilityklok"	Mark Brooks	Brendon Small	September 26, 2010	306
46	7	"Dethsiduals"	Mark Brooks	Brendon Small & Kristofor Brown	October 3, 2010	307
47	8	"Rehabklok"	Mike Roush	Brendon Small	October 10, 2010	308
48	9	"Dethzazz"	Mark Brooks	Brendon Small & Janine DiTullio	October 17, 2010	309
49	10	"Doublebookedklok"	Jon Schnepp	Brendon Small	October 24, 2010	310

=== Season 4 (2012) ===
No. overall	No. in season	Title	Directed by	Written by	Original release date	Prod. code	US viewers (millions)
50	1	"Fanklok"	Jon Schnepp	Brendon Small	April 29, 2012	401	0.76
51	2	"Diversityklok"	Mark Brooks	Mathew Libman & Daniel Libman	May 6, 2012	402	1.04
52	3	"Prankklok"	Brendon Small	Janine DiTullio	May 13, 2012	403	0.89
53	4	"Motherklok"	Jon Schnepp	Dani Vetere	May 20, 2012	404	N/A
54	5	"Bookklok"	Mark Brooks	Brian Posehn	May 27, 2012	405	0.80
55	6	"Writersklok"	Brendon Small	Mark Brooks	June 3, 2012	406	1.01
56	7	"Dethcamp"	Jon Schnepp	Mark Brooks	June 10, 2012	407	0.96
57	8	"Dethvanity"	Felipe Salazar	Janine DiTullio	June 17, 2012	408	0.99
58	9	"Going Downklok"	Mark Brooks	Brendon Small & Dani Vetere	June 24, 2012	409	1.05
59	10	"Dethdinner"	Brendon Small	Brendon Small	July 1, 2012	410	0.96
60	11	"Breakup Klok"	Mark Brooks	Brendon Small	July 8, 2012	411	0.86
61	12	"Church of the Black Klok"	Brendon Small	Brendon Small	July 15, 2012	412	1.14

=== Special (2013) ===
Title	Directed by	Written by	Original release date	Prod. code
Metalocalypse: The Doomstar Requiem	Mark Brooks	Brendon Small	October 27, 2013	S01
This one-hour rock opera special picks up directly after the season 4 finale. Note: Sometimes listed as the 13th episode of Season 4.

=== Future ===
In April 2014, in an interview on Steve Agee: Uhhh podcast, Brendon Small confirmed that a fifth and final season was in pre-production. Small was originally waiting on Adult Swim for an appropriate budget in order to end the show the way he wants rather than rushing it. But after pitching the idea for the finale to the network, they turned it down, stating that they did not have the budget for it.

In October 2015, Brendon Small announced a month-long social media campaign entitled "Metalocalypse Now" as an attempt to gather fan support to have Hulu and Adult Swim co-finance the final season of Metalocalypse. At the time it was thought to be successful, the finale to be titled: Metalocalypse: The Army of the Doomstar – The Final Chapter, and would be a miniseries on Hulu Plus.

In May 2016, Brendon Small said in an interview that he is "all but finished making Dethklok records" due to Adult Swim declining to continue with the final season despite popular support of the continuation. Small stated that as a result of the "Metalocalypse Now" campaign, financial backers had come forward to fund the Metalocalypse finale, but Adult Swim ultimately did not want to go forward and make a finale. Small stated that he does have plans to eventually finish the Metalocalypse story, but he cannot say how.

On May 12, 2021, Adult Swim announced a direct-to-video film is in development and will be released on home video and digital followed by streaming on HBO Max 90 days after along with a broadcast premiere on the channel. Metalocalypse: Army of the Doomstar is a direct sequel to the 2013 special, Metalocalypse: The Doomstar Requiem. The film was released on August 22, 2023, alongside Dethklok's fourth studio album, Dethalbum IV. This concluded the Metalocalypse story.

== Notes ==
- The airing of season 2 was suspended for six months between November 18, 2007, and May 18, 2008. The bumper for the episode "Cleanso" stated: "Next is the last new Metalocalypse of the year. It's taking a break 'til 2008. After all, the holidays are brutal enough, so you metal fiends will have to make do with the old eps or the CD, or go back to college and catch the tour before it runs out." Season 2 was relaunched on April 6, 2008, starting with "Dethwedding".
- Each episode of season 3 is 21 minutes long, season 4 returned to the 11 minute runtime.
