= Metalocalypse: Army of the Doomstar =

2023 animated film

- Poster
- Directed by: Brendon Small
- Screenplay by: Brendon Small
- Story by: Mark Brooks; Janine Ditullio; Brian Posehn; Brendon Small; Andrew Kevin Walker
- Based on: Metalocalypse by Brendon Small; Tommy Blacha
- Produced by: Laura Allen
- Starring: Brendon Small; Tommy Blacha; Victor Brandt; Stephen "Thundercat" Bruner; King Diamond; Mark Hamill; Kirk Hammett; Jon Hamm; Scott Ian; Amy Lee; Malcolm McDowell; Juliet Mills; Laraine Newman; Raya Yarbrough; Livia Zita
- Edited by: Thomas Berkley
- Music by: Brendon Small
- Production companies: Titmouse, Inc.; Williams Street
- Distributed by: Warner Bros. Home Entertainment
- Release date: August 22, 2023
- Running time: 83 minutes
- Country: United States
- Language: English

Metalocalypse: Army of the Doomstar is a 2023 American direct-to-video adult animated musical fantasy film based on the Adult Swim animated series Metalocalypse. The film is written and directed by series co-creator Brendon Small and is a direct sequel to the 2013 special, Metalocalypse: The Doomstar Requiem. The film was released on August 22, 2023, alongside Dethklok's fifth studio album, Dethalbum IV. The film was dedicated to longtime series director, Jon Schnepp, who died in 2018 before production began.

The film is the third and final of Adult Swim's line of straight-to-video movies after Aqua Teen Forever: Plantasm and The Venture Bros.: Radiant Is the Blood of the Baboon Heart, and was released by Warner Bros. Home Entertainment.

The film picks up after the events of the Metalocalypse: The Doomstar Requiem special, with Dethklok tasked to write the "song of salvation" in order to save the planet from impending doom, and serves as the series finale to the Metalocalypse.

== Plot ==
Dethklok hold a press conference to announce a new tour and album. While the rest of the band have no recollection of rescuing Toki from the Revengencers, Nathan suffers from post-traumatic stress which results in his passing out during a performance. All plans are postponed while he recovers at Mordhaus. During a memorial service for Ishnifus Meaddle, Charles Offdensen (now leader of the Church of the Black Klok) tasks Nathan with writing the "Song of Salvation" to prevent the Doomstar from destroying the Earth and allowing Mr Salacia to become whole again, but Nathan declines, deciding to settle down with Abigail. However, Abigail declines his marriage proposal. After a confrontation with fans who witnessed it, Nathan ultimately decides to focus on his music, and the band go to a secret studio retreat where they are guided by Dick Knubbler.

Meanwhile, General Crozier has been temporarily freed from control by Mr. Salacia who attempts to possess another person. Crozier attempts to send a message but is stopped by Vater Orlaag before Salacia regains control. Salacia attempts to possess William Murderface, who experiences disturbing and painful hallucinations as Salacia influences him to damage Nathan's confidence and prevent the Song of Salvation from being written, as well as revealing the location of the Army of the Doomstar.

At the end of their training and a drug-induced meeting between Nathan and the Whale Prophet, the band begin performing the song they have composed. However, as they begin, Nathan realizes that it is the wrong song. During their performance of "Aortic Desecration", the Doomstar approaches Earth and begins the Metalocalypse, destroying monuments across the planet and killing millions. The US Army and the Tribunal's own militia then attack the band's location, wiping out the Army of the Doomstar and killing Knubbler. During the attack, Crozier is able to free himself of Salacia's control while Murderface flees, still possessed and blaming himself for sabotaging the band. Crozier offers his help to the band as Skwisgaar is able to reveal Murderface's possession to the others. Crozier tells the band how to free Murderface from Salacia and the band forgive Murderface for what happened, given that he was not in control of his actions, explaining that he belongs in the band as his negativity brings balance to the group.

Realising what they now need to do, Dethklok and Crozier reconvene with Edgar Jomfru to perform the correct Song of Salvation, "SOS", but during their performance, Vater Orlaag orders an attack on the group. Dethklok are captured by Salacia and, after Nathan refuses Salacia's offer to join him, the five are attached to the superconductor Salacia built to draw in the Doomstar. This allows Salacia to draw on the power of the Doomstar and commence the "Great Reuniting", becoming whole once more, but Nathan is able to break free of his restraints and interrupt the machine for the rest of the band to break free. Jomfru and Crozier infiltrate the facility, with Jomfru killed after activating a bomb that destroys the control system. The band are joined by Offdensen, the Church of the Black Klok, and their legions of fans, and fight the Tribunal's forces and the US Army while Vater Orlaag fights Offdensen. Just as Orlaag is about to kill Offdensen, he is distracted by Murderface, allowing Offdensen to recover and kill Orlaag. Crozier manages to regain control of the US military and orders them to stand down and assist the fans, apprehending the Tribunal's forces.

However, Salacia emerges from his cocoon in his true form, killing many of the people on the battlefield. As he attempts to kill Dethklok, Nathan draws on the power of the Doomstar to counter Salacia's attacks. The band's power spreads to the legions of fans, amplifying their power and forcing Salacia to "Go into the Water", where he is killed by the Whale Prophet. Addressing their fans in the aftermath, Nathan realizes that the fans are the true Army of the Doomstar, and that their new relationship with their fans is the true "Great Reuniting". The group and fans celebrate as the movie ends.

== Voice cast ==
- Brendon Small as Nathan Explosion, Skwisgaar Skwigelf, Pickles, Charles Offdensen, Edgar Jomfru, Dick Knubbler
- Tommy Blacha as Toki Wartooth, William Murderface, Dr. Rockzo
- Malcolm McDowell as Vater Orlaag
- Raya Yarbrough as Abigail Remeltindrinc
- Mark Hamill as Mr. Salacia, Senator Stampingston, Oscar Explosion, Fan
- Victor Brandt as General Crozier
- Thundercat as Fan
- King Diamond as Priest
- Jon Hamm as Emcee, Fan
- Scott Ian as Elite Tribunal Soldier, Fan
- Amy Lee as Fan
- Juliet Mills as Whale
- Livia Zita as Tribunal Member
- Laraine Newman as Rose Explosion, Newscaster

== Soundtrack ==
The original motion picture soundtrack for the film was released on August 25, 2023, through WaterTower Music.

== Reception ==
A review on The Daily Beast says of the film: "It may be the weirdest and wildest music series of all-time, yet at its fire-and-brimstone core, Small and Blacha's Metalocalypse saga is a sincere ode to the thrilling extremism of metal and a celebration of the idea that music is life—and, when loud and ferocious enough, capable of saving the world."

A review at Blu-Ray.com states "So yes, it's a page ripped directly out of the Bill and Ted's Excellent Adventure playbook – or, to a much lesser extent, Bill and Ted Face the Music – albeit with a much more darkly funny and violent edge. That's about as big a complaint as I can muster for what's otherwise a well-crafted and even emotionally effective love letter to die-hard fans who've patiently waited a full decade for the band to get back together." The film was additionally reviewed in Polygon and IGN.
