= Revengeance =

Revengeance may refer to:

- Metal Gear Rising: Revengeance, a video game spinoff in the Metal Gear series by Konami, formerly known as Metal Gear Solid: Rising
- "Revengeance", a song by American metal band Soulfly on their album Enslaved
- The Revengencers, a fictional terrorist organization in the animated television series Metalocalypse
  - "The Revengencers", a season 2 episode of Metalocalypse
- Revengeance (film), American film
