= Metalocalypse season 4 =

Metalocalypse
- Season 4
- DVD cover
- No. of episodes: 12

Release
- Original network: Adult Swim
- Original release: April 29 – July 15, 2012

Season chronology
- ← Previous; Season 3 Next → The Doomstar Requiem

The fourth and final season of the animated show Metalocalypse originally aired on Adult Swim from April 29 to July 15, 2012 with 12 episodes. The show follows virtual death metal band Dethklok. This season returned to the original 11-minute-long episode format (15 minutes with commercials). Several songs from this season were included in the album Dethalbum III, which was also released in 2012. The season four DVD/Blu-ray was released on October 30, 2012 through Adult Swim/Warner Home Video.

In May 2015, this season became available on Hulu Plus.

== Guests ==
This season featured several new guest stars, including Drew Pinsky, Amber Tamblyn, Werner Herzog, Byron Minns, Christopher McCulloch, Samantha Eggar, Pat Healy, Ben Shepherd and Kim Thayil of Soundgarden, Cam Pipes of 3 Inches of Blood, Jon Hamm, Janeane Garofalo, Patton Oswalt, Marc Maron, Dweezil Zappa, Asesino, James Urbaniak, Chris Elliott, and Billy Gibbons of ZZ Top, as well as returning guest stars, like Laraine Newman, George "Corpsegrinder" Fisher of Cannibal Corpse, Frankie Ingrassia, and Andy Richter.

== Special features ==
=== Disc one ===
- Nathan reads Shakespeare #4: A Comedy of Errors

=== Disc two/Blu-ray disc ===
- Pickles Flyby
- StaresDowns #1-3
- MurderThoughts
- The Prophecy
- Dr. Rockzo's greatest hits
- CFO Raps
- Dethklok Fan Art
- The DethGame

== Episodes ==
No. overall	No. in season	Title	Directed by	Written by	Original release date	Prod. code	US viewers (millions)
50	1	"Fanklok"	Jon Schnepp	Brendon Small	April 29, 2012	401	0.76
As the episode begins, a narration begins saying: "as the prophecy foretold, they licked their wounds and returned from the air to the earth." Mordhaus finishes its renovations and rejoins the earth. Nathan reveals in an interview that he is, for the first time ever, dating a fan. Simultaneously Murderface reveals that he has taken up smoking, which encourages the others to start as well. Meanwhile the Tribunal have another meeting, revealing that the last of the FalconBack Project investments will be made up of the profits that Dethklok's new album will receive. The rest of the band become concerned on how Nathan's girlfriend, Trindle (voiced by Amber Tamblyn), knows everything about Dethklok but they do not know anything about her; they find her computer and discover that she has been cheating on Nathan with hundreds of other people who look like Nathan, is responsible for the abduction of lead singers from Dethklok tribute bands, and is wanted by authorities. Upon breaking the news to Nathan, he takes them to a Dethklok fan convention called the Klokikon, where Trindle has an expo, to prove them wrong. They enter the expo where multiple Nathan look-a-likes are lining up to get a blowjob from Trindle. Nathan runs to the rooftop with Trindle chasing him, she reveals that she loves him so much that she "wants all of you [Nathan]" and reveals a time-bomb strapped beneath her shirt, believing that it will be the perfect explosion. Offdenson arrives in a helicopter and rescues the band. In the end, Trindle's fleshy face ends up in Nathan's. Guest Voices: Drew Pinsky, Amber Tamblyn & Werner Herzog Songs included: "Rejoin"
51	2	"Diversityklok"	Mark Brooks	Mathew Libman & Daniel Libman	May 6, 2012	402	1.04
At a press conference discussing their new album, the band do nothing but fool around, and Nathan constantly quips his new catchphrase, "That's doable." Unexpectedly, the band is accused of racism by a reporter; soon, the media is in a frenzy, and Offdensen scrambles to salvage the situation. Meanwhile, Toki has become resentful of the band due to his constant exclusion, and resolves to start his own club, which Murderface is not invited to join because of his mustache, which he has grown out of control. The band, excluding Murderface, enjoy the activities of Toki's club, and Murderface becomes desperate to join; he slicks his hair flat in an attempt to change his appearance, but Toki makes it clear that his mustache is the problem. The band prepares to open their new urban youth center to alleviate the accusations of racism, and Toki gives them secret uniforms for his club, along with special hats. Donning the outfits in the darkness of the stage, Dethklok is finally revealed onstage in white robes and pointed caps, in front of a gigantic white lowercase "t" (Toki's club logo). Murderface rushes onstage shortly after, having shaved his mustache into a toothbrush mustache and now resembling Adolf Hitler. He accidentally trips over a wire and sets the "t" logo on fire, creating a burning cross. Enraged, the crowd attacks as the burning logo collapses. The youth center opening is a catastrophe and Dethklok flees, causing Nathan to quip upon fleeing "This is SO not doable". And through it all, Toki gets left behind again. Guest Voices: Byron Minns
52	3	"Prankklok"	Brendon Small	Janine DiTullio	May 13, 2012	403	0.89
Dethklok's new album begins shipping to countries all around the world and is believed to increase employment and the global economy. Pickles and Nathan begin their "Friender Bender" where they drink all around the world. Murderface intends to spend his vacation prank-calling people and Skwisgaar and Toki become his first victims. They attempt to get revenge by using his credit card to purchase plastic explosives, believing it will get him in trouble, instead they are beaten and apprehended by authorities (along with Murderface). At the same time, a freak storm sinks every ship carrying the album. The only copy left is the master copy located beneath Mordhaus, where a drunken Nathan has a vision of the whale from "Fanklok" (voiced by Samantha Eggar) telling him to destroy the album. Pickles rushes down just in time to see Nathan pick up an axe, believing that the storm is a sign and the album must be destroyed. Pickles attempts to stop him, but to no avail; Nathan destroys the master copy, leaving no copies left. Guest Voices: Christopher McCulloch, Samantha Eggar & Werner Herzog
53	4	"Motherklok"	Jon Schnepp	Dani Vetere	May 20, 2012	404	N/A
Six months after the destruction of Dethklok's new album, the economy plummets and is in the middle of what people are calling "The Dethcession." Dethklok decides to do a series of "Dethfairs," which are essentially carnivals that have Death Metal themed rides and where Dethklok performs for free to rebuild the economy. The first Dethfair takes place in Pickles' hometown: Tomahawk, Wisconsin. At the first press conference for the Dethfair, Nathan talks about the rides, but is booed away from the podium. It is then revealed Pickles is talking to his mother, telling her that he wants to get closer to her. She immediately shuts him down, telling him that his job is not a real job and that he is an embarrassment to her. Pickles sets out to get a "real" job as a real estate agent. After numerous attempts to sell houses, Pickles realizes that houses cost money, he has money, and he's a real estate agent, hinting that he will just buy the houses from himself, and he eventually becomes the top realtor in Wisconsin. During the Dethfair, Dethklok performs at the Dethfair, hoping to rebuild the economy they plummeted. But as they do so, the Dethfair ends up in a violently disastrous massacre. After the credits, Pickles is gloating to his mother about his "blue-collar" success, but she proceeds to instantly belittle his accomplishments, saying that it is more important to play in Dethklok and rebuild the economy. Infuriated, Pickles tells her to "go fuck" herself, at the request of his other band members. Guest Voices: Pat Healy, Ben Shepherd of Soundgarden, Laraine Newman & Werner Herzog Songs included: "Ghostqueen" NOTE: The episode is dedicated to Archibald Clark West who died on September 20, 2011.
54	5	"Bookklok"	Mark Brooks	Brian Posehn	May 27, 2012	405	0.80
While playing a concert in Brazil, Toki begs Skwisgaar to let him play a guitar solo, but Skwisgaar refuses, referencing Toki's lack of practice as the reason. As he plays the solo, Toki curses him backstage and swears revenge. Some time later, Toki writes a tell-all book called "Skwisgaar Is Ams Dick" and is touring various talk shows condemning Skwisgaar and promoting the book. The Tribunal meets and talks about Toki's book and reveal that the Revengencers are still active and that their leader, The Metal Masked Assassin, is still alive. The Dethklok Minute shows that Skwisgaar's popularity is plummeting and that all his endorsements have gone to Toki. After that, he loses a solo spot to Toki. Skwisgaar tries to reason with Toki, but he refuses. Skwisgaar warns that "the audience ams a fickles mistress." As Toki begins to play the solo, all is going well until he keeps stepping on his cord, unplugging his guitar, and audience turns on Toki and he falls over, having a panic attack. Nathan, Pickles, and Murderface talk about how useful a defibrillator would be at the moment (even though Murderface is holding it in his hands.) Skwisgaar rushes over to Toki and shocks him multiple times, yelling "Comes backs to me's dammit!" Toki tries to explain that he's having a panic attack and not a heart attack, but he knocks Nathan's defibrillator off and into the ice, sending everyone into a panic. The ice from the Ice Fest breaks apart, killing everyone. Guest Voices: George "Corpsegrinder" Fisher of Cannibal Corpse, Laraine Newman & Cam Pipes of 3 Inches of Blood
55	6	"Writersklok"	Brendon Small	Mark Brooks	June 3, 2012	406	1.01
Nathan is having writer's block and cannot seem to write new songs. After the record company hears the new demos and does not like them, their producer Dick Knubbler is fired, and a new female producer, Abigail Remeltindrinc (voiced by Janeane Garofalo), is brought in. Abigail, while being demeaned by the band, completely takes them over and books them for a mandatory vacation. Nathan tries to get Dick Knubbler back, and he agrees to talk to the new producer. The band ends up in a Middle Eastern country where they are repeatedly thought to be women. After a week, due to them not bringing any food, money, or identification they are taken to a palace where a sultan tells them that they are to become new members of his harem and must immediately perform fellatio on him. To prevent this, the band tries to convince them they are Dethklok. Sultan Jamawa (voiced by Jon Hamm) tells them they either perform fellatio or perform a new song that nobody has ever heard. They perform a song as an inspiration for the women to rebel against the soldiers. As Jamawa, his financial advisor, and his army are killed, they are saved by a group of female mercenaries disguised as wives in the sultan's harem. During the credits, Abigail hires Dick Knubbler as an engineer, and at the very end, she knees him in the crotch. Guest Voices: Jon Hamm, Janeane Garofalo, Frankie Ingrassia & Werner Herzog Songs included: "Andromeda"
56	7	"Dethcamp"	Jon Schnepp	Mark Brooks	June 10, 2012	407	0.96
Offdensen goes out of town and leaves Nathan and Pickles in charge as Toki goes to Rock-A-Rooni Fantasy Camp where he tries to make friends with other campers. Before leaving, Nathan gives Toki a Mordhaus snow-globe as he leaves; and upon arriving at the camp, Toki is subject to bullying because he is a diabetic. Meanwhile, Skwisgaar and Murderface use Toki's absence as an opportunity to do things they can't do when Toki is around, including watching horror movies and eating candy. Meanwhile, at the camp, Toki discovers that Ludwig (voiced by Soundgarden's Kim Thayil) is being a bully, so he is chased by him, but bumps into Dethklok's former bandmate Magnus Hammersmith (voiced by Marc Maron). Nathan discovers that Magnus Hammersmith (Toki's predecessor who swore revenge on them years ago) is at the camp, and drives there to save Toki along with the rest of the band. Meanwhile, after Toki performs at the camp, Ludwig and his bully friends trip him over and force cake into his mouth, nearly killing him, but Magnus inserts an insulin shot into Toki and saves him. Ludwig then proceeds to smash Toki's snow-globe on the ground just as Nathan and the band arrive. Nathan picks up the smashed snow-globe and chases Ludwig into the forest, cutting off one of his hands as the moon turns red. Guest Voices: Patton Oswalt, Werner Herzog, Marc Maron, Dweezil Zappa, and Kim Thayil of Soundgarden Songs included: "The Hammer"
57	8	"Dethvanity"	Felipe Salazar	Janine DiTullio	June 17, 2012	408	0.99
Murderface receives an award for being the "brutalest looking" musician in the world. Angered, he attempts to better his appearance through cosmetic surgery, but finds he lacks the funds to pay for the procedure when Offdensen reminds him that he had recently lost most of his money in a lawsuit. After borrowing money from Nathan, Murderface goes to a shady cosmetic surgeon (voiced by Asesino's Dino Cazares) in Mexico. In the meantime, the rest of the band are shocked when they are named the "#1 Aging Rockers." At the awards ceremony, the rest of the band show up with a plethora of quick, albeit sloppy and ineffective, cosmetic treatments while Murderface returns wearing a full-face helmet. Murderface then removes the helmet to show off his new look, but is horrified to find that his face, instead of looking handsome, has been horribly disfigured. The band splash coffee and squirt lemon juice in Murderface's eyes and the audience flees in horror as the credits roll. Guest Voices: Andy Richter, Frankie Ingrassia, Asesino (Dino Cazares (Tony Campos), Emilio Márquez) & Patton Oswalt
58	9	"Going Downklok"	Mark Brooks	Brendon Small & Dani Vetere	June 24, 2012	409	1.05
The band prepare to go back into the water via DethSub to record the new album and are informed by Offdensen that women are not allowed on board (security risk) with the exception of Abigail. Within a month the band masturbate so much they get advanced carpel tunnel syndrome and are forbidden to "jack off" for three months. The band use the sub's gym as an alternative but begin to go crazy with the lack of sex. Pickles and Nathan begin to compete for Abigail while Murderface begins to have sexual thoughts towards Toki. Pickles attempts to kiss Abigail but is turned down, he calls out her sexual frustration and she reveals that she uses a vibrator as a substitute for having sex with co-workers. Shortly after, her vibrator runs out of power, and Murderface attempts to rape Toki. Pickles warns Nathan that he will never be able to have sex with her and if he tries "there will be consequences". Unhappy with the recordings the band have made Offdensen decides to re-record the tracks in isolated areas including inside an active mine field (Skwisgaar and Toki), in the Devil's cave (Pickles) and in the sub's corridors (Murderface) while Nathan and Abigail are in the recording studio. Nathan goes down on her, and the volume for Nathan's mic is accidentally turned up for the rest of the band. Klokateers begin to steer into mines and Abigail, realizing that she broke her own rule, gets up and leaves Nathan to scream in despair. Guest Voices: Werner Herzog, James Urbaniak & Janeane Garofalo
59	10	"Dethdinner"	Brendon Small	Brendon Small	July 1, 2012	410	0.96
Dethklok attends a fancy record label dinner to work on promoting their new album, and Offdensen tries to keep the band in line. Toki spends all his time on FaceFriends and reunites with Dr. Rockzo, while Murderface uses Toki's absence to try to gain more production credits. When Nathan refuses, Murderface goes on a hunger strike. Nathan tries to get in contact with Abigail, believing that their liaison was something more, and Pickles overhears Nathan's confession of love to Skwisgaar. At the dinner, Nathan tries to talk to Abigail, despite being placed several yards away from each other, while Murderface gets drunk on an empty stomach, Pickles gets increasingly angrier at Nathan, Toki arrives hammered and urine-stained with Dr. Rockso, Skwisgaar watches the train wreck, and Offdensen tries in vain to slow the inevitable spiral of disaster that they're bringing it to. After Nathan proclaims his love for Abigail and announces that they are "an item", much to her horror, Pickles snaps and expresses his outrage at Nathan taking everything without regard to others all of the time, and being the cause of the problems since the season began (none-the-least with the demise of the Master Record and Dethcession). When a drunk Murderface gets in his face, Pickles punches him and announces he is quitting Dethklok. Guest voices: Werner Herzog, Chris Elliott & Janeane Garofalo
60	11	"Breakup Klok"	Mark Brooks	Brendon Small	July 8, 2012	411	0.86
Continuing from the conclusion of "Dethdinner," Dethklok dissolves and announces the plans for their final performance. To move on, Nathan and Skwisgaar team up with Dick Knubbler to search for a new sound, Murderface decides to run for Congress from New Jersey with Toki as his intern, and Pickles retires from music to open a winery for the world's most alcoholic wine. Each of these ventures fail (Nathan and Skwisgaar cannot find a better sound than Dethklok, Toki accidentally releases pictures of Murderface masturbating, and Pickles's wine causes illness due to steroids in the grapes), and the group sullenly heads for Iceland to play their last show. Toki has begun turning to Magnus Hammersmith as a friend after the events of "Dethcamp," but it is revealed that he is now a member of the Revengencers. At the concert, while Nathan and Pickles struggle with both performing and considering apologizing to each other, Mr. Salacia attacks, slaughtering the fans with his powers before killing Roy Cornickelson. Realizing that the long-feared prophecy is finally coming true, Offdensen evacuates the band underwater, where he finally reveals Salacia's identity to them, addressing him as "The Half-Man" and beginning to tell them the truth of the Metalocalypse. Guest Voices: Marc Maron, Billy Gibbons of ZZ Top, Werner Herzog, Janeane Garofalo & Laraine Newman
61	12	"Church of the Black Klok"	Brendon Small	Brendon Small	July 15, 2012	412	1.14
Offdensen takes Dethklok to a secret underwater cave, where a religious sect known as the Church of the Black Klok is sheltered. He and Ishnifus Meaddle, the High Holy Priest to the church (voiced by filmmaker Werner Herzog), explain that when Offdensen witnessed Salacia brainwashing General Crozier in "Black Fire Upon Us," Salacia laid a curse on him that separated his soul and body, but the Church of the Black Klok saved him. Because his soul had been separated from his body, Offdensen became "The Dead Man" and could no longer be seen by Salacia. He followed Crozier for nine months gathering intelligence on the Falconback Project before returning to Dethklok in "Renovationklok." Ishnifus explains that the Metalocalypse began with Salacia's killing of Cardinal Ravenwood in "The Metalocalypse Has Begun," and that Dethklok's albums are actually messages to the world that save the people from the end of the world. The whale seen in several season four episodes is revealed to be a prophet that speaks to Nathan in his dreams, and it drove him to destroy the album in "Prankklok" because it was the wrong message. Later, at Roy Cornickelson's funeral, Nathan gives the eulogy in front of a huge crowd - including Abigail and Magnus Hammersmith, who Toki brought despite warnings from Dr. Rockzo - and ultimately becomes overwhelmed by the emotions surrounding the collapse of Dethklok. Nathan apologizes to Pickles for everything and they embrace, but a hidden bomb is suddenly detonated, opening up fissures in the ground from which the Metal Masked Assassin and the Revengencers emerge. While the Revengencers randomly slaughter people, Offdensen warns the band back and once again does battle with the Metal Masked Assassin. However, when he is knocked down by one of Offdensen's punches, the Metal Masked Assassin yells an order to Magnus, who stabs Toki after proclaiming the arrival of his revenge, incapacitating him. Abigail also is shown getting stabbed shortly thereafter in a similar fashion. Evacuating to the submarine once more, Offdensen tells the remaining members of Dethklok that they must complete the album's final song and release it to have any hope of stopping the Metalocalypse, but in order to do that, they must find and save Toki and Abigail, whom he and Ishnifus believe are still alive somewhere. Nathan exclaims that once they rescue their friends, he's going to take care of everyone who is a threat to Dethklok, once and for all. Guest Voices: George "Corpsegrinder" Fisher of Cannibal Corpse, Marc Maron, Werner Herzog, Samantha Eggar, Janeane Garofalo & Chris Elliott

== See also ==
- List of Adult Swim home videos
