= Metalocalypse season 2 =

Metalocalypse
- Season 2
- DVD cover
- No. of episodes: 19

Release
- Original network: Adult Swim
- Original release: September 23, 2007 – September 7, 2008

Season chronology
- ← Previous; Season 1 Next → Season 3

The second season of the animated show Metalocalypse originally aired on Adult Swim from September 23, 2007 to September 7, 2008 with 19 episodes. The show follows virtual death metal band Dethklok. The majority of the music featured this season was released on the 2009 album Dethalbum II, while the song "Impeach God" from the episode "Dethgov" was released as part of Dethalbum III in 2012. The first episode of this season, "Dethecution" was released as part of the deluxe edition of The Dethalbum. This season featured the new re-recorded version of the "Deththeme", released as a hidden track on The Dethalbum.

In May 2015, this season became available on Hulu Plus with all episodes in HD. Some episodes on Hulu Plus, such as "Snakes & Barrels II" contain uncensored nudity and additional graphic violence, however all episodes still contain their original broadcast audio with words such as "fuck" and "shit" bleeped out.

== Guests ==
This season featured several musicians as voice actors, such as Silenoz and ICS Vortex of Dimmu Borgir, Angela Gossow and Michael Amott of Arch Enemy; Samoth, Ihsahn and Trym Torson of Emperor; Exodus, Devin Townsend, Mike Keneally, Richard Christy, Gene Hoglan, Marty Friedman, George "Corpsegrinder" Fisher of Cannibal Corpse, Marco Minnemann, Mike Patton of Faith No More, and Warrel Dane and Steve Smyth of Nevermore. Comedians Laraine Newman and Brian Posehn and actress Frankie Ingrassia also appeared as voice actors.

== Special features ==
Disc One

- Dethklok playing band naming game
- News report on Klokateers
- Toki playing arcade game ("P.R Pickles" deleted scene)
- Murderface goes to the opera
- Offdensen making phone calls
- Mordhaus things
- Klokateers clearing Dethboat for landing ("Dethcarraldo" extended scene)
- Dethboat being pulled over mountain ("Dethcarraldo" extended scene)
- Murmaider music video

Disc Two

- Nathan Explosion reading William Shakespeare's Titus Andronicus
- Dr. Gibbons editing Murderface visual
- Edgar Jomfru swim training
- The band watching NASCAR ("Dethrace" deleted scene)
- Fans on fans ("Black Fire Upon Us" deleted scene)
- Offdensen parties with the band ("Dethsources" deleted scene)
- Klokateers: In Memoriam
- Knubbler interviews Murderface and Toki about the song "Takin' It Easy"
- Bloodrocuted music video

== Episodes ==
No. overall	No. in season	Title	Directed by	Written by	Original release date	Prod. code
21	1	"Dethecution"	Jon Schnepp & Chris Prynoski	Tommy Blacha & Brendon Small	September 23, 2007	201
Following the attempt on their lives in the season one finale, Dethklok has withdrawn from the public eye. The band manager convinces them to hold a concert by promising them the opportunity to decide how a number of deathrow inmates will be executed. Dethklok performs at the prison-on-board in a giant four-legged mech, the inmates are strapped to rockets and detonated in midair as part of the performance. During the show, Skwisgaar accidentally sprays mace in the eyes of one of the mech's drivers, and it smashes into the nearby prison releasing hundreds of prisoners. Pickles calls the incident a "happy accident." During the credits, one of the prisoners, whose name is Alfred Belmer, attempts to feast on a human baby. Guest voices: Silenoz of Dimmu Borgir, Mike Keneally and Laraine Newman Songs included: "Laser Cannon Deth Sentence" Note: This is the first episode produced in 16:9 High Definition.
22	2	"Dethlessons"	Jon Schnepp	Tommy Blacha & Brendon Small	September 30, 2007	202
Toki, fed up of being in Skwisgaar's shadow, takes guitar lessons from a crusty old guitar master. Meanwhile, Nathan and Pickles take lessons from Murderface on how to be a dick. When Toki's mentor dies of natural causes, Toki attempts to publicly demonstrate what he learned: the names of the guitar strings, but he is unable to do even that. Songs included: "I Tamper With the Evidence at the Murder Site of Odin"
23	3	"Dethvengeance"	Jon Schnepp	Tommy Blacha & Brendon Small	October 7, 2007	203
The assassin from the episode "The Metalocalypse Has Begun", is seen torturing a Klokateer, trying to find out how to get into Mordhaus. Also a UN resolution allows Dethklok to act as a police force is passed, as a result, Klokateers begin kidnapping and torturing people who illegally download Dethklok songs from the internet. At the same time, Dethklok starts experiments with recording on water — the purest of analog formats. Every "record" is produced as a canister of water, requiring huge amounts of power and pollution. Meanwhile, one particular fan is kidnapped by roadies and tortured at Mordhaus for infringing the group's songs, only to meet Edgar Jomfru from episode "Mordland". Edgar places a mask made of the remains of his brother's face on the fan. Meanwhile, on Mordhaus, the band are drinking polluted recording water without Dick's warning. He and the fan escape before, after the credits, being found by the assassin, who carries them to safety. Guest voices: George "Corpsegrinder" Fisher of Cannibal Corpse and Mike Keneally. Songs included: "Burn the Earth"
24	4	"Dethdoubles"	Chris Prynoski	Tommy Blacha & Brendon Small	November 4, 2007	204
After another public bloodbath, Offdensen hires Dethklok decoys (one of them voiced by Dimmu Borgir's ICS Vortex) to make public appearances the band. Unfortunately, the band becomes attached to their look-a-like clone doubles, not knowing that they are in reality, spies for the Tribunal. The band performs in a volcano being used as a giant cup of coffee, but accidentally reawakens it. The band's look-a-like clone doubles, who use the concert as an opportunity to capture intelligence on Dethklok are caught in the resulting eruption, and scalded beyond recognition. On Burzums, the band are seen talking to their incinerated clone doubles, until Murderface accidentally shoots them. Guest voice: ICS Vortex of Dimmu Borgir, Arcturus, and Code Songs included: "Volcano"
25	5	"Fashionklok"	Jon Schnepp	Tommy Blacha & Brendon Small	November 11, 2007	205
Dethklok begin to design clothes, with help from an infamous fashion designer (voiced by Emperor's Ihsahn) who was convicted of starving his models to death. However, when the group's prototype clothing doesn't fit they are forced to diet. The designer starts using "special leather", which Dethklok later finds out is actually the skin of starved and murdered models. Dethklok fires their new designer while in a petrified state of fear. Guest voices: by Samoth, Ihsahn, and Trym Torson of Emperor. Songs included: "Symmetry"
26	6	"Cleanzo"	Jon Schnepp	Tommy Blacha & Brendon Small	November 18, 2007	206
Toki receives a phone call from Dr. Rockzo asking for his help. With the help of Doctor Jonathon Twinkletits, apparently surviving the events of "PerformanceKlok", the band convinces Dr. Rockzo to kick his addiction. Meanwhile, Murderface attempts to prove he can write music to the rest of the band, but is constantly interrupted by the Dr. Rockzo's situation. Guest voice: Devin Townsend.
27	7	"Dethwedding"	Chris Prynoski	Tommy Blacha & Brendon Small	April 1, 2008	208
As the Revengencers announce their existence to the public, Pickles is invited to his brother Seth's wedding. Dethklok are instructed to bring a gift and to perform at the wedding. Seth opens gift, a blender, and accuses Pickles for ruining his wedding. Pickles initial reaction is to start beating his brother senseless, then run away as the police begin to arrive. Feeling bad for his brother, Pickles accepts Ofdenson's offer of making Seth head of Dethklok Australia (a position where the previous holders were brutally murdered). Guest voices: by Devin Townsend, ICS Vortex (Dimmu Borgir, Arcturus, Borknagar, Code) and Silenoz (Dimmu Borgir).
28	8	"P.R. Pickles"	Jon Schnepp	Tommy Blacha, Brendon Small & Bill Braudis	May 25, 2008	207
Pickles gets a new PR lady (head of the "Exodus PR firm") who inflates his fame as part of a conspiracy to lure new members into her cult, who she plans to kill after robbing them blind. She succeeds in murdering the cult but is killed by a meteorite that ricocheted off an orbital Dethklok advertisement. After the credits, three more meteors land on Juice Point, the Arctic, and the Dethklok Minute Studio, respectively killing one of the fans (voiced by Devin Townsend), backing off one of the walls, and injuring the Dethklok Minute host (though he is not killed). Guest voices: by Laraine Newman and Devin Townsend. Songs included: "Comet Song"
29	9	"Dethcarraldo"	Jon Schnepp	Tommy Blacha & Brendon Small	June 1, 2008	209
Dethklok watches a documentary about the Amazon River on Cannibal Culture and become obsessed with going there. Crozier is instructed by the Tribunal to follow Dethklok to the Amazon to keep an eye on things. The band is captured by the natives and become exposed to the drug Yopo. As the band transform into their animal forms, Crozier is also exposed to Yopo and begins to have hallucinations of Cardinal Ravenwood as the rest of his team are killed by natives. The episode contains references to the film Fitzcarraldo, most notably the moving of a large boat over a mountain. Guest voices: Laraine Newman, and ICS Vortex (Arcturus, Borknagar, Code) and Silenoz of Dimmu Borgir. Songs included: "Duncan Hills Coffee Jingle" and "Bloodlines"
30	10	"Dethgov"	Tommy Blacha & Chris Prynoski	Tommy Blacha & Brendon Small	June 8, 2008	210
The governor of Florida promises to veto a bill to give Nathan Explosion a state holiday, and enraged fans abduct and murder him brutally, opening his position. Nathan is elected as governor in an emergency election as a write-in candidate and sends Florida into a downward spiral culminating in a hurricane which devastates the state. He ends his governorship asserting, "I leave Florida better than I found it." During the credits, one of the two survivors claims Nathan to be the "best fuckin' governor Florida ever had", before being shot in the head by another survivor. Guest voice: Richard Christy Songs included: "Impeach God"
31	11	"Dethrace"	Jon Schnepp	Tommy Blacha & Brendon Small	June 15, 2008	211
Murderface plays the national anthem at a NASCAR race by playing his bass guitar with his penis. This event however is overshadowed by Skwisgaar and Toki's drunken high speed chase. They are arrested, but not be found guilty if they get their licenses and do some charity work. Offdensen proposes that Murderface produce the charity event as Skwisgaar and Toki take driving classes. Murderface plans to create a "NASCAR-type Theatrical Hybrid Event", though he never elaborates on exactly what this will entail, he eventually has to speak at a press conference to explain, but gets nervous and Pickles gives him a "special pill" that "slows down your heart" but has Speed, Angel dust, a hint of coke, and a splash of acid to counteract the low. Murderface not surprisingly has an enormously powerful reaction to the pill as he does not possess Pickles' near immunity to drugs, and he twitches and drools through his press conference. Meanwhile, Skwisgaar and Toki fail their driving lessons after refusing to drive out of fear. At the NASCAR event, Murderface, who is still delusional, rubs his butt on the racetrack as the cars race by, causing an accident. The style of the race and drivers vaguely resembles the videogame Rock n' Roll Racing by Blizzard Entertainment. Guest voice: Marty Friedman
32	12	"The Revengencers"	Jon Schnepp	Tommy Blacha & Brendon Small	June 22, 2008	212
The episode opens in a Duncan Hills coffee house as Dethklok fans trade stories of mutilation and brutality as results from their devotion to Dethklok. The nameless fan from episode "Dethvengeance" plants a bomb under a chair in the store, and runs out before the store is destroyed. The Tribunal then reviews the incident, revealing that it is being repeated around the country; the culprits are the Revengencers: the Metal Masked Assassin, Edgar Jomfru, and the teenager. Dethklok reluctantly plans a charity concert for the fans maimed in the attacks, despite each member of the band simultaneously suffering from a summer cold. As they perform at the charity concert, Edgar attempts to assassinate them with a rifle, but he is discovered by the Dethklok fans who attack him. In the chaos, the Metal Masked Assassin ambushes Offdensen after disguising himself as a Klokateer, and throws him through a window on the (at least) the third floor of the hospital, but lands on his feet without injury. The masked assassin then rescues Edgar and the teenager from being shot down by the Klokateers and escapes. Guest voices: George "Corpsegrinder" Fisher of Cannibal Corpse and Exodus (Tom Hunting, Gary Holt, Rob Dukes, Jack Gibson, Lee Altus) Songs included: "Duncan Hills Coffee Jingle" and "Dethsupport" Notes: Episode also known as "Sicklok"
33	13	"Klokblocked"	Mark Brooks	Tommy Blacha & Brendon Small	June 29, 2008	213
Nathan breaks up with his comatose girlfriend, Rebecca Nightrod, from episode "Girlfriendklok, after he finds out she is "canoodling" with billionaire hotel heir Walt Perkins. He then begins dating again, but the band interferes in various ways, such as refusing to give him and his date privacy or maintaining relationships with previous dates. Meanwhile, a group named Succuboso Explosion, led by Lavona Succuboso (voiced by Arch Enemy's Angela Gossow), forms with the intention of capturing Nathan and breeding him with its members. Lavona attempts to use "The Loin Extractor" on Nathan at the next Dethklok concert, but Murderface sees the incoming device and leaps in front of it. The Extractor hits Murderface's bass guitar, short circuits, and sends Lavona flying away. Guest voices: Frankie Ingrassia, Angela Gossow of Arch Enemy and Laraine Newman
34	14	"Dethsources"	Jon Schnepp	Tommy Blacha & Brendon Small	July 6, 2008	214
The band wants to know more about their finances and hire a second business manager (voiced by Brian Posehn) to help teach them about it. But he immediately sets his sights on taking Ofdensen's job as sole business manager of the band, leading to a fencing duel to the death between the two men. Guest voice: Brian Posehn and Gene Hoglan Songs included: "The Gears"
35	15	"Dethdad"	Mark Brooks	Tommy Blacha & Brendon Small	July 13, 2008	215
Toki receives a phone call informing him that his Dad has cancer. The rest of Dethklok are given the choice to accompany Toki's journey to Norway or start recording the new album; they choose the former in order to avoid work. Toki delays seeing his father for as long as possible and the band finally convinces him to do it. After seeing his father, Toki tells the rest of the band that his father's last wish is to see the house he was raised in. As Toki climbs up the icy stairs to the house, he slips on the last step and drops his father into the ice.
36 37	16 17	"Snakes n' Barrels II"	Jon Schnepp	Tommy Blacha & Brendon Small	August 24, 2008	216; 217
While watching an episode of "Where Are They Now Now?", Pickles discovers that his former band, Snakes 'n Barrels, has reformed with a new lead singer, Rikki Kixx (voiced by Faith No More's Mike Patton), and are preparing for the SOBERTOWN USA No Drugs Allowed Sober Rock and Roll Show. Kixx owns a Rehab center for celebrities, including Leonard Rockstein (formerly Dr. Rockso), who is hosting show. The Tribunal reveals that Kixx' takeover of Snakes 'n' Barrels is a result of the intentional malleability of the band resulting from the consumption of the mind-control agent "Totally Awesome Sweet Alabama Liquid Snake." The drug also has another side effect: causing blue phosphorus snakes to shoot from every orifice of the user's body, them to go mad with rage; when they are exposed to bright lights, loud sounds, and pyrotechnics. It is then revealed that Rikki Kixx is not really passionate about sobriety. It was forced upon him due to liver failure, and his only motivation for promoting it is to deny the world the pleasures he can no longer enjoy. Dethklok travels to Los Angeles so that Pickles can confront his former band. Pickles bribes his way to Snakes 'n' Barrels but is unable to convince them not to perform with Kixx. As the concert ignites the phosphorus snakes in the band, Toki starts beating the annoying fan (voiced by Marco Minnemann). The audience is haunted by three of Snakes n' Barrels incarnated as monsters and Murderface seeks revenge on Toki for hacking into his website and turning it into a bestiality site. Nathan, Skwisgaar, and Murderface stare in shock as one of the audience members is brutally killed. The concert then explodes, killing Pickles' former band, along with Kixx. Rockso relapses as the crowd destroyed the purpose of sobriety by drinking furiously in response. Note: This is the first half-hour episode of the series. An alternate version of this episode premiered on Hulu Plus with uncensored video, however the audio is still censored. Guest voices: Mike Patton of Faith No More, Warrel Dane and Steve Smyth of Nevermore, Michael Amott of Arch Enemy, Marco Minnemann Notes: Often listed as one whole episode (Episode 16)
38	18	"Dethrecord"	Mark Brooks & Jon Schnepp	Tommy Blacha & Brendon Small	August 31, 2008	218
A group of terrorists steal nuclear weapons and threaten to detonate it unless there is word of a new album soon. Dethklok, under great pressure, rushes to complete the album. They run into difficulties, such as buzzing whenever Skwisgaar touches his guitar while on the ground. Nathan attempts to enhance the metalness of his vocals by wearing a medieval suit of armor. Toki and Murderface record a song "Takin' It Easy" and attempt to pitch it to the band, but it is deemed unmetal, and soundly rejected. It is announced to the world through smoke emitting from Mordhaus' chimney, a reference to the Papal election process, that they had finished their album.
39	19	"Dethrelease"	Jon Schnepp & Chris Prynoski	Tommy Blacha & Brendon Small	September 7, 2008	219
Toki and Skwisgaar are looking at a video, that Nathan recommended, of a man sucking his own penis, they all conclude that everything they do is really an attempt to get someone else to do that for them, and if they could do it themselves, they could retire from music. Murderface interrupts this discussion with a fire drill, explaining he was recently elected as Fire Chief of the band in a unopposed election. Meanwhile Mr. Selatcia and Vater Orlaag are discussing General Crozier's recent promotion to chief of all US military operations. Orlaag refers to Selatcia as "master" before asking what they will do about Crozier, to which Selatcia responds, "I will enlighten him." In a meeting of world leaders, it is revealed Dethklok is now the world's 7th largest economy and the underdeveloped countries are dependent on the band succeeding. This is threatened the terrorist group The Revengencers, who General Crozier promises on his life to stop. After the concert, the band holds a party at Mordhaus, which is ended by the Revengencers' attack using an energy weapon against the Mordhaus. Offedensen launches his squad of Klokateers while Murderface as Fire Chief leads people inside Mordhaus to safety. Pickles and Skwisgaar rush to save the master copy of the record they just recorded as Nathan is dragging a drunk Toki out to safety. The Revengencers begin attacking Mordhaus by land as General Crozier watches the chaos from a helicopter. Skwisgaar and Pickles successfully fend off the minions using their instruments as weapons. Offedensen's charge on the energy weapon takes heavy casualties but successfully destroys the weapon; he then attempts to escape on a hover-cycle with the Metal Masked Assassin in hot pursuit, but is shot by the nameless teenager. Crozier then knocks out the teenager with the butt of a shotgun, before being confronted by Orlaag and Selatcia. Selatcia then says, "I'm going to show you something because you need to know" before placing his hand on Crozier's forehead. We then see through Crozier's eyes flashes of five planets and stone tablets representing the five members of Dethklok, as well as a figure reminiscent of Selatcia wearing elaborate bone armor, while a voice ominously says, "You are mine now." Selatcia and Orlaag disappear, leaving Crozier whose eyes are now glowing red. Edgar Jomfru corners Skwisgaar and Pickles with a shotgun, prompting Pickles to admit that he managed to suck his own penis and because of this he is prepared to die. Edgar remembers his life before his brother's death, when he lived for Dethklok and is unable to pull the trigger before being set upon and mercilessly beaten by Klokateers. Meanwhile, Offdensen is being furiously beaten by the assassin, who does not kill him immediately, explaining, "I want you to stay alive as I torture you, I want you to feel the pain." Nathan incapacitates him with a flaming log, saying, "That's my bread and butter you're fucking with." The band has survived, but Offdensen's injuries may be too severe for him to survive, and Mordhaus is burnt to the ground. Guest voice: George "Corpsegrinder" Fisher of Cannibal Corpse, Angela Gossow of Arch Enemy and Laraine Newman Songs included: "Black Fire Upon Us" Notes: Episode also known as "Black Fire Upon Us"; Episode sometimes divided into two parts (listed as episode 19 and 20)

== See also ==
- List of Adult Swim home videos
