= Lil' Pimp =

- Directed by: Mark Brooks; Peter Gilstrap
- Written by: Mark Brooks; Peter Gilstrap
- Produced by: Amy Pell
- Starring: Mark Brooks; Lil' Kim
- Music by: Frank Fitzpatrick
- Distributed by: Lions Gate Home Entertainment
- Release date: January 11, 2005
- Running time: 80 minutes
- Country: United States
- Language: English
- Budget: $2 million

Lil' Pimp is a 2005 American adult animated dark comedy film directed and written by Mark Brooks and Peter Gilstrap, but based upon an episodic web animation by the same name. Originally planned as a theatrical release through Columbia Pictures, the film was released straight-to-DVD on January 11, 2005, by Lions Gate Home Entertainment, and starred hip-hop rapper Lil' Kim and Bernie Mac as voiceover artists.

== Plot ==
A redheaded, freckled, little nine-year-old white boy (whose name is not mentioned during the movie, but is revealed in the very end of the movie, as well as in the credits, to be "Lil' Pimp") is unable to convert to suburban life, as his only pet sidekick is a foul-mouthed gerbil, and faces constant rejection by his peers. He accidentally meets a prostitute under the name of Sweet Chiffon, who takes him to her working company, an evening bar called "The Playground", where he befriends the pimp "Fruit Juice", who gives him a small amount of "pimp glitter". He decides he wants to become a pimp.

The following day at school, during show-and-tell he is scorned by his classmates for not having a living male relative and decides to use the pimp glitter to summon Fruit Juice, who consequently impresses the entire class. When he visits the Playground again, Fruit Juice alters the boy's aesthetic and dresses him as a pimp, too. Meanwhile, mayor Tony Gold threatens to close Fruit Juice's bar, unless he is given 90 percent of the profits. After this incident the boy's mother goes in search of him, first directed to a gay-aimed evening bar and informed by Sweet Chiffon of a "nasty midget" closely resembling her son and then to The Playground. The boy did not return home to his mother, of which Mayor Tony is informed directly and takes advantage, accusing Fruit Juice of keeping the boy against his will. He is promptly arrested and his bar is closed down. Afterwards, mayor Tony Gold kidnaps Fruit Juice's prostitutes, in order to exploit them, while assigning two policemen to place a bomb in the closed Playground.

Meanwhile, Fruit Juice believes that the boy betrayed him, but upon being visited and helped to escape by the boy, he changes his demeanor towards him. After the narrow escape, the boy's friends meet privately in his room in order to concoct a plan to foil the mayor's scheme. His mother discovers them and agrees to disguise herself as a prostitute in order to seduce the two policemen into giving her the keys to the Town Hall. The boy and his friends enter the Town Hall secretly and unveil Mayor Tony's wide range of crimes, while the boy sets the prostitutes free. Then, after the gang moves explosives, along Mayor Tony, unaware of the situation, presses the key on the remote-controlling "da bomb", demolishing the Town Hall.

Finally, Fruit Juice turns his bar into an amusement park, also called "The Playground", but less erotically unrestricted. Mayor Tony and the two policemen are then shown to be working at the amusement park as costumed mascots.

== Cast ==
- Mark Brooks as Lil' Pimp
- Bernie Mac as Fruit Juice
- Lil' Kim as Sweet Chiffon
- Ludacris as Weathers
- William Shatner as Mayor Tony Gold
- Danny Bonaduce as Nasty Midget
- Kevin Michael Richardson as Smokey
- Jill Talley as Mom/Old Lady/Mary
- David Spade as Principal Nixon
- Peter Gilstrap as Skinny Peeps/Kevin/Bonny
- Big Boy as Nag Champa
- John C. McGinley as Man Cub Master
- Mystikal as Geoffrey
- Jack Shih as Cabbie
- Jennifer Tilly as Miss De La Croix
- Carmen Electra as Honeysack
- Tom Kenny as Hans Dribbler Announcer/Billy/Clancey/Adam 12 Cop

== Production ==
In August 2000, it was reported that Revolution Studios had signed a deal with Mark Brooks and Peter Gilstrap to turn their Flash animated webseries for Mediatrip.com, Lil’ Pimp, into a 80-minute, full-length feature film with Brooks and Gilstrap set to direct the film using their team of four animators. The deal marked the fourth major pick-up by a major studio of an online property following Starship Regulars for Showtime, Stan Lee's The 7th Portal by Mark Canton, and Undercover Brother by Universal Pictures. In July 2001, it was reported that Bernie Mac, Jennifer Tilly, William Shatner, and Carmen Electra had signed on for voice roles in the film. Eddie Griffin had been slated to voice Lil' Pimp, but dropped out because of My Baby's Daddy. While the film was initially planned as a theatrical release via Sony Pictures, after Revolution saw the final-cut film it was decided to trim their losses and scrap the theatrical release. After a direct-to-video was briefly considered, the film was shelved with no plans for release until Lions Gate Films purchased distribution rights.

== Release ==
Lil' Pimp was given straight-to-video release in the United States on January 11, 2005.

== Reception ==
In their negative review for the DVD, DVD Verdict commented that several people had walked out of the 2003 test screenings held by Sony Pictures (who had initially held the rights to the film) and that they (the reviewer) recommended that people stay away from the 2005 DVD release. In contrast, the Metro Times gave a positive review for the DVD, stating "In a perfect world, this would've came out with an accompanying soundtrack and DVD extras like the 48 'Webisodic' episodes, but as a stand-alone item, Lil' Pimp works its odd little corner of the world nicely."
