= Metalocalypse season 1 =

Metalocalypse
- Season 1
- DVD cover
- No. of episodes: 20

Release
- Original network: Adult Swim
- Original release: August 6 – December 17, 2006

Season chronology
- Next → Season 2

The first season of the animated show Metalocalypse originally aired on Adult Swim from August 6 to December 17, 2006, with 20 episodes. The show follows virtual death metal band Dethklok. The majority of the music featured this season was released on the 2007 album, The Dethalbum.

In late March 2013, this season became available on Netflix. In May 2015, this season became available on Hulu Plus.

== Guests ==
This season featured several musicians as voice actors, such as Kirk Hammett and James Hetfield of Metallica, Michael Amott of Arch Enemy; Steve Smyth, Warrel Dane and Jeff Loomis of Nevermore; George "Corpsegrinder" Fisher of Cannibal Corpse and King Diamond of the eponymous band. Comedians Laraine Newman, Andy Richter, and Laura Silverman also appeared as voice actors.

== DVD special features ==
Disc One

- Murderface's bass solo ("Birthdayface" extended scene)
- The Skwisgaar Skwigelf Advanced Fast Hand Finger Wizard Master Class Instructional Video
- Ravenwood learning from Skwisgaar Skwigelf Advanced Fast Hand Finger Wizard Master Class
- Thunderhorse – Skwisgaar's music video outtakes
- Nathan Explosion reading William Shakespeare's Hamlet (extended scene)
- Murderface plays "Wheelchair Bound" (extended scene)

Disc Two

Main menu

- 9 band interviews
- Mordhaus tour
- Murder Reel

Episodes menu

- Toki's codpiece ("Murdering Outside the Box" uncensored scene)
- Salacia teaser
- Burzum's food menu
- Nathan's Groupies ("Girlfriendklok" uncensored scene)
- Pickles' "Scourge of Drugs"

== Episodes ==
No. overall	No. in season	Title	Directed by	Written by	Original release date	Prod. code
1	1	"The Curse of Dethklok"	Jon Schnepp	Tommy Blacha & Brendon Small	August 6, 2006	101
Thousands of hardcore Dethklok fans travel to Norway to see Dethklok perform one song, which is revealed to be a coffee jingle endorsing Duncan Hills Coffee. A firework display during the show goes wrong when a rocket sends the band's chef into the rotor of their helicopter, slicing him into pieces, but miraculously not killing him. With the chef still segmented at the hospital and unable to cook, the band struggles to come up with a solution to eating. After a failed shopping attempt, they solve the problem by sewing the chef back together, with limited success. Guest voices: James Hetfield and Kirk Hammett of Metallica, Laraine Newman Songs included: "Duncan Hills Coffee Jingle" and "Hatredy"
2	2	"Dethwater"	Jon Schnepp	Tommy Blacha & Brendon Small	August 13, 2006	102
The band records an album in the Mariana Trench in a nuclear submarine. The Tribunal blackmails the label-sent producer Dick Knubbler into spying on them, but after hearing the band he turns on the Tribunal to become the band's permanent producer. When Knubbler tries to leave the submarine in a submersible he is attacked by a giant seahorse that was mutated by the nuclear submarine's radiation, forcing him to rush to the surface without depressurizing causing his eyes to explode. Songs included: "Thunderhorse" and "Murmaider"
3	3	"Birthdayface"	Jon Schnepp	Tommy Blacha & Brendon Small	August 20, 2006	103
Murderface's birthday party is approaching and the rest of the band cannot decide what to get him. They initially present him with the darkest, most brutal gift of all: nothing. They go to a castle to meet Margrethe II of Denmark (voiced by Metallica's Kirk Hammett). She is later killed after sampling the mercury frosting of Murderface's cake. After he storms out, the band gets him the car that John F. Kennedy was assassinated in, outfitted with other various brutal historic items (most notably, the theater chair that Abraham Lincoln was sitting in when he was assassinated, installed in place of the driver's seat) and enrolls him in a "Dethderby" to demolish other cars so he can literally "destroy United States history." Dr. Rockso makes his debut appearance. Guest voices: James Hetfield and Kirk Hammett of Metallica Songs included: "Birthday Dethday"
4	4	"Dethtroll"	Chris Prynoski	Tommy Blacha & Brendon Small	August 27, 2006	104
In Finland, the band accidentally awakens the lake troll Mustakrakish (voiced by Metallica's James Hetfield). The giant troll goes on a rampage, killing thousands, destroying entire cities, and disabling all electronics in Finland. The band decides to put the troll back to sleep solely so they can once again use e-mail and their DSL-equipped Dethphones, albeit by playing antique acoustic instruments shown to them by an old Finn at a bar. Their soporific lullaby works until Murderface's newly reactivated Dethphone rings. Murderface promptly loses reception and throws his barbed and bladed Dethphone down the Mustakrakish's throat, whereupon the troll gruesomely eviscerates itself in a desperate and frantic attempt to get it out. The episode ends with the band feasting on its corpse. Guest voices: James Hetfield and Kirk Hammett of Metallica Songs included: "Awaken"
5	5	"Dethkomedy"	Jon Schnepp	Tommy Blacha & Brendon Small	September 3, 2006	105
Dethklok experiments with stand-up comedy. Pickles endures severe heckling by the audience. Although they achieve success after some tutelage and learning to "embrace the hate" taught by a crusty old sailor (voiced by Metallica's James Hetfield), Pickles remains severely traumatized the memory of a heckler. Pickles eventually embraces his hate and once again performs standup. He successfully wins the audience's approval by throwing sand and blood on the front row and by firing a rifle wildly. Guest voice: James Hetfield of Metallica Songs included: "Murmaider" and "Hatredy"
6	6	"Dethfam"	Jon Schnepp	Tommy Blacha & Brendon Small	September 10, 2006	106
A journalist reunites the members of Dethklok with their families, driving the band insane as they must deal with their greedy, annoying, and aggressive relatives. Finally, the parents and siblings decide to make a Dethklok family album, asserting that "there is nothing in this world more brutal and grotesque than raising children." Guest voice: Laraine Newman
7	7	"PerformanceKlok"	Chris Prynoski	Tommy Blacha & Brendon Small	September 17, 2006	107
After attacking each other on stage during a show, Dethklok seeks out a therapist to help them get along with each other. The therapist, an ex-musician named John Twinkletits who ultimately killed his bandmates, encourages Dethklok to open up by rewarding them with shiny banana stickers. But when Twinkletits tries to infiltrate and take control of the band, they fire him. He tries to murder them with a pen, but falls through a window into a pit of wolves. Guest voice: Jeff Loomis of Nevermore
8	8	"Snakes n' Barrels"	Jon Schnepp	Tommy Blacha & Brendon Small	September 24, 2006	108
A documentary on Pickles' pre-Dethklok band Snakes N' Barrels airs, causing renewed interest and prompting the band to reunite. Pickles' commitment to Snakes N' Barrels causes Dethklok to go on a temporary hiatus. The Tribunal plots to permanently erase Pickles' mind with a new superdrug they have created: Totally Awesome Sweet Alabama Liquid Snake. The drug works on the other members of Snakes N' Barrels, but Pickles' many years of intense drug-taking has rendered him immune. Guest voices: Michael Amott of Arch Enemy, Steve Smyth and Warrel Dane of Nevermore
9	9	"Mordland"	Jon Schnepp	Tommy Blacha & Brendon Small	October 1, 2006	109
Mordhaus is opened to the public for the annual "fan day" and the band members quickly grow annoyed. For this special occasion, Dethklok plays "Fansong" which describes their hatred of their fans. Two brothers who operate Dethklok's biggest fan website attempt to pirate the song and extort the band. Ultimately, one brother is killed and the other imprisoned for their transgression. Songs included: "Fansong"
10	10	"Fat Kid at the Detharmonic"	Chris Prynoski	Tommy Blacha & Brendon Small	October 8, 2006	110
Dethklok begins doing as much charity work as possible to help their tax situation, even going as far as adopting a son. The band's poor "parenting" consists of tying him outside, feeding him nothing but sugar, neutering him, and not providing him with a bathroom, among other things. They eventually "release him back into the wild" on an island populated by feral cats. As the Dethchopper flies into the sunset, the cats descend on him in an orgy of bloodshed. Songs included: "Dethharmonic" Note: Episode also known as "Fatklok"
11	11	"Skwisklok"	Jon Schnepp	Tommy Blacha & Brendon Small	October 15, 2006	111
Skwisgaar hosts the "Skwisgaar Skwigelf Advanced Hand Finger Wizard Master Class" Pay Per View guitar workshop, inspiring the rest of Dethklok sign endorsement deals out of jealousy. Skwisgarr's hands are encased in solid crystal oxygenating hand-aquariums as a precaution prior to the show, but they become locked. In an attempt to remove them, he lubricates his hands with barbecue sauce before licking them; he then realizes that the sauce contains cilantro which he is allergic to. His hands and tongue swell up immediately before the live show. Throughout the workshop he is unintelligible and completely unable to play his guitar. However, due to his overwhelming popularity, he is determined to "reinvent the instrument" and fans mimic his moves by stroking the guitar with stiff fingers. Guest voice: King Diamond of the eponymous band
12	12	"Murdering Outside the Box"	Jon Schnepp	Tommy Blacha & Brendon Small	October 22, 2006	112
Dethklok's annual "Employee Conference and Raffle" coincides with the revelation that funds are being embezzled from the band. General Crozier takes advantage of the situation and sends an assassin to infiltrate the ranks of Dethklok's hooded roadies. The assassin fights his way onto the stage during a lottery draw, but trips and falls onto Murderface's diamond encrusted codpiece just before he tries to shoot Dethklok. The "embezzler" ultimately turns out to be the band itself, but they blame it on the assassin, who gets a Viking funeral. Guest voice: King Diamond of the eponymous band Songs included: "Briefcase Full of Guts"
13	13	"Go Forth and Die"	Chris Prynoski	Tommy Blacha & Brendon Small	October 29, 2006	113
The band's lead vocalist Nathan Explosion attempts to earn his GED after a nightmare in which the rest of the band is killed by random things at a show, and Murderface is invited to appear on a celebrity spelling bee game-show. Nathan studies math and reading while Murderface attempts to convince the rest of the band that he's a great speller despite being illiterate. Nathan becomes nervous before his test and starts to drink, scoring a perfect 0 as a result, answering no questions on the test. Murderface, unsurprisingly, misspells the first word given to him as he started spelling before it was even read. Guest voices: George "Corpsegrinder" Fisher of Cannibal Corpse and King Diamond of the eponymous band Songs included: "Go Forth and Die"
14	14	"Bluesklok"	Jon Schnepp	Tommy Blacha & Brendon Small	November 5, 2006	114
After falling into a deep depression, Dethklok travels to Mississippi to learn about the blues. They negotiate with the Blues Devil (voiced by King Diamond's Kim Petersen) for "blues fame" (distinct from their metal fame), showing great skill in reading music business legal contracts, in contrast to their overall business incompetence. They test their blues skills on an assembly of hippies. Their song then summons a tornado, killing many. Guest voices: George "Corpsegrinder" Fisher of Cannibal Corpse and King Diamond of the eponymous band Songs included: "Murdertrain A Comin'"
15	15	"Religionklok"	Chris Prynoski	Tommy Blacha & Brendon Small	November 12, 2006	115
Murderface searches for a religion after a near-death experience. Dethklok's involvement in religion greatly disturbs the Tribunal due to the potentially catastrophic effects it could have; General Crozier recommends immediate action to demobilize Dethklok, but is silenced by Mr. Selatcia. Afterwards, Crozier and Cardinal Ravenwood meet to discuss Selatcia. They form a secret alliance for the upcoming "operation." Murderface tries several different religions, including visiting a Christian rock concert, a mass at the "Church of the Atheists". Finally he attends a Satanic mass where the preacher attempts to summon the four demons of the apocalypse, where Murderface concludes that "all religions are a bunch of boring crap", and returns to his regular life. After Dethklok leaves the Satanic mass, demonic hands smash through the ground of the Satanic church, and Cardinal Ravenwood is seen praying desperately before a cross.
16	16	"Dethkids"	John Schnepp	Tommy Blacha & Brendon Small	November 19, 2006	116
Toki tries to compensate for his adorable charm by becoming overly brutal. A young dying girl wins the opportunity to meet him as a last wish, but he refuses to see her. The band's lawyer encourages him to watch a DVD the girl made where she sings of her desire to meet Toki. He finally decides to meet her, but when he reaches her, she has already died. Horrified, he has vicious hallucinations of her face infected by maggots and flies and of her accusing him of her death in a distorted, screaming voice. After the credits, Murderface and Dick discuss the Planet Piss project so far. Dick asked Murderface if they could restart the urine perfume project, but Murderface refuses to do it again. Guest voice: George "Corpsegrinder" Fisher of Cannibal Corpse
17	17	"Dethclown"	Chris Prynoski	Tommy Blacha & Brendon Small	November 26, 2006	117
Toki befriends Dr. Rockso, to the dismay of the rest of the band, unaware that the Tribunal has commissioned him to gather information. The clown manages to capture some important documents, but rather than chase him as he escapes, Offdensen orders the Klokateers to follow him so they can see where he goes. Rockso returns the documents to General Crozier and Cardinal Ravenwood.
18	18	"Girlfriendklok"	Brendon Small	Tommy Blacha & Brendon Small	December 3, 2006	118
Dethklok is asked to host the United States Pornography Awards, but Nathan's new controlling girlfriend puts a damper on the situation for the entire band: if he can't go, they can't go. The band abducts, ties up, and tortures Nathan in an attempt to convince him to dump his girlfriend. He concedes, but before he has the opportunity, she falls down several flights of stairs and is knocked into a coma. As she lay comatose, Nathan asks her, "please give me a sign if you don't want me to go to the pornography awards." Not surprisingly, she gives no sign and Dethklok attends. Guest voice: Laura Silverman Songs included: "Castratikron"
19	19	"Dethstars"	Tommy Blacha	Tommy Blacha & Brendon Small	December 10, 2006	119
Dethklok enters the movie industry by starring in a metal film, "Blood Ocean." Unfortunately, the band cannot act, and the film is an abomination. After walking out of their own premiere, Dethklok tries to convince the producer to shut down the movie, but he replies that because he wants a return on his investment, that he will push forward with the "500-million-dollar shit sandwich, and you are all going to take a bite." As Dethklok leaves in their helicopter, it accidentally damages the oil platform the premiere was on, starting a fire which incinerates the audience, producer and all copies of the film. Since the producer had previously written all the reviews for the film before it was even finished, Business News Weekly's front page reads, "World's Greatest Movie Destroyed!" Guest voices: Andy Richter and Laura Silverman Songs included: "Blood Ocean"
20	20	"The Metalocalypse Has Begun"	Jon Schnepp & Chris Prynoski	Tommy Blacha & Brendon Small	December 17, 2006	120
As Dethklok prepares to play their new album for the very first time live, General Crozier and Cardinal Ravenwood break rank with the rest of the Tribunal and lead a full-scale assault on the band, and they hire an assassin (voiced by Cannibal Corpse's Corpsegrinder), whose brother was killed by Dethklok in episode "Murdering Outside the Box." The assassin corners Toki and Skwisgaar, but is confronted by Ofdensen stating, "That's my bread and butter you're fucking with." The two duel and Ofdensen wins, knocking the assassin into the sea, but not killing him. General Crozier and the Cardinal corner the other band members, and after a bloody battle with the Klokateers, prepare to kill them. However, Mr. Selatcia appears and uses magic to destroy the Cardinal's eyes and force his intestines out of his mouth. He then turns to Crozier saying, "You I need alive" and makes him fall asleep. The band approaches the dying Cardinal who utters the final words, "The Metalocalypse has begun..." Guest voice: George "Corpsegrinder" Fisher of Cannibal Corpse Songs included: "Go Into the Water" Note: This is the last episode produced in 4:3 Standard Definition.

== See also ==
- List of Adult Swim home videos
