= Metalocalypse: The Doomstar Requiem =

- A Klok Opera
- Genre: Dark comedy; Drama; Musical
- Created by: Tommy Blacha; Brendon Small
- Written by: Brendon Small; Brian Posehn (additional writer)
- Story by: Brendon Small; Janine DiTullio; Mark Brooks
- Directed by: Mark Brooks
- Voices of: Jack Black; Victor Brandt; George Fisher; Mark Hamill; Mike Keneally; Malcolm McDowell; Brendon Small; Raya Yarbrough
- Composer: Brendon Small
- Country of origin: United States
- Original language: English

Production
- Executive producer: Brendon Small
- Producer: Shannon Prynoski
- Editors: Mark Brooks; Felipe Salazar (additional editor)
- Running time: 47 minutes
- Production companies: Titmouse, Inc. Williams Street

Original release
- Network: Adult Swim
- Release: October 27, 2013

Related
- Metalocalypse

Metalocalypse: The Doomstar Requiem – A Klok Opera is an American rock opera special for the Adult Swim animated series Metalocalypse. It was announced on May 10, 2013, by Adult Swim and was released on October 27, 2013. The special picks up directly after Metalocalypse season 4. It featured all-new music from Dethklok, which was released on a soundtrack album on October 29, 2013.

== Plot ==
The special begins with Ishnifus Meaddle chanting and singing with the monks of the Church of the Black Klok about the Doomstar being born, and that before the "prophet's night" is over, one of them must die, as Charles Offdensen looks on and expresses concern for "the looming Metalocalypse" ("The Birth/Fata Sidus Oritur/One of Us Must Die"). It then cuts to Magnus Hammersmith and the Metal Masked Assassin holding Toki Wartooth and Abigail Remeltindrinc prisoner, keeping them both just barely alive in order to lure the remaining members of Dethklok into their trap ("Magnus and the Assassin"). Meanwhile, Dethklok is "partying around the world" in an attempt to forget that Toki is missing ("Partying Around the World"), while Offdensen is in the control room attempting to locate Toki. The Klokateers' best operative has returned dead, with a USB flash drive found in his remains. It contains a video of Magnus holding Toki and Abigail hostage, saying that his location is at the "depths of humanity."

Ishnifus tries to motivate Dethklok to search for Toki, calling them "brothers", but Dethklok denies that they care about Toki ("Tracking/Ishnifus and the Challenge"). Dethklok then collectively laments about the weight that is being put on their shoulders, and question their ability to rescue Toki if it comes down to that. Ultimately, they refuse Ishnifus's plea ("How Can I Be A Hero?"). At a live show, the band uses a hologram to represent Toki, but it malfunctions, and the fans begin booing Dethklok. Realizing that they have no other choice, Dethklok finally makes the decision to find and rescue Toki ("The Fans Are Chatting").

Abigail comforts Toki in an attempt to ease his fears, urging him to go to his "happy place" ("Abigail's Lullaby"). This is shown to be the day when Toki first auditioned to be in Dethklok. The band needed a new guitarist after they kicked out Magnus, so Skwisgaar Skwigelf engages in a guitar battle with the hopeful tryouts, defeating them all. Toki arrives late, but Skwisgaar gives him a chance anyway ("Some Time Ago..."). They begin a guitar duel, in which Toki is able to perform nearly on-par with Skwisgaar. Eventually Toki makes a mistake at the end of the duel, and while the band says he can't join, Skwisgaar says, "Nobodys ever made me plays this wells", and invites Toki to join Dethklok ("The Duel"). Toki then thinks of his happiness at the band's subsequent fame and fortune, and at his acceptance in the band ("I Believe").

A meeting of the Tribunal is shown, with Mr. Salacia, Senator Stampingston, General Crozier and Vater Orlaag present. They mention Dethklok's decision to rescue Toki, and discuss that they have a traitor within Dethklok's ranks ("A Traitor Amongst Them"). Meanwhile, Edgar Jomfru helps the band prepare for their rescue mission, and both he and Ishnifus have some inspiring words for them ("Training/Do It All for My Brother"). Before they leave, Offdensen resigns as their manager, saying he can no longer protect them ("Before You Go").

Dethklok realizes that "Depths of Humanity" is the name of the club where Toki played his first gig with Dethklok ("The Answer Is In Your Past"), and goes there to find him. Instead they encounter their old band manager, Skwisgaar's old guitar teacher, and old groupies. They harass Dethklok about how the band abandoned them. One member pulls Murderface aside to greet him, and "accidentally" cuts his wrist. The rest of the band grab Murderface and flee the club. Skwisgaar shows the band an old flyer for the rehearsal space where they auditioned Toki, and they head there to find him ("The Depths of Humanity").

On their way they encounter a mob of zombie-like musicians and drug addicts. Realizing they cannot fight the army, they instead give them no reason to hate Dethklok - Nathan writes checks to the musicians, while Skwisgaar, Murderface, and Pickles donate their equipment to help them get started in the music industry. The junkies can't be bought off, though, and Pickles has no drugs to sate their addictions. All seems lost, until Dr. Rockso suddenly appears with a giant bag of cocaine so that the band can escape ("Givin' Back To You"). Inside the practice space, they are ambushed by the Metal Masked Assassin. However, Ishnifus appears, and sacrifices himself as a distraction, so that Dethklok can proceed to find Toki and Abigail ("En Antris Et Stella Fatum Cruenti").

The band considers giving up and making a run for it, with Murderface pointing out that if it was he and not Toki, nobody would come after him. Nathan realizes he would risk his life for any member of Dethklok, and the four resolve to complete their mission ("The Crossroads"). They succeed in locating Toki and Abigail and free them. They are confronted once more by the Assassin, but they stand by Toki, and their brotherhood activates the power of the Doomstar, ascending them to inhuman heights and finally killing the Metal Masked Assassin. Magnus sees the error of his ways and realises he is the villain. He stabs himself in the heart, taking his own life as recompense for his sins against his former bandmates ("Morte Lumina").

In the conclusion, Dethklok celebrates their success with a massive concert, Nathan and Abigail share a kiss, and Offdensen becomes the new high priest of the Church of the Black Klok ("Blazing Star"). At the very end, a sleeping Murderface is shown being slowly overtaken by some sort of dark energy, emanating from the wound on his wrist.

== Voice cast ==
- Brendon Small as Nathan Explosion, Skwisgaar Skwigelf, Pickles, William Murderface, Young Toki Wartooth, Charles Offdensen, Ishnifus Meaddle, Edgar and Eric Jomfru, Magnus Hammersmith, Dr. Rockso, Dethklok Minute Host, all Klokateers, Church of the Black Klok monks, old guitar teacher, strange man from Depths of Humanity, fans
- Mike Keneally as Toki Wartooth
- Malcolm McDowell as Vater Orlaag
- George "Corpsegrinder" Fisher as Metal Masked Assassin
- Raya Yarbrough as Abigail Remeltindrinc, Dethklok's producer
- Mark Hamill as Mr. Salacia, Senator Stampingston
- Victor Brandt as General Crozier
- Jack Black as Dethklok's original manager, Fat Fan
- Ulrich Wild (uncredited) as Bald Fan

== Production ==
The score was composed by Brendon Small. A 50-piece orchestra was composed by Bear McCreary. The special contained several guest voice actors such as George "Corpsegrinder" Fisher and Jack Black.

The primary writers for the special were Brendon Small, Janine Ditullio, and Mark Brooks, with additional writing by Brian Posehn. Tommy Blacha did not reprise his roles for Toki Wartooth, William Murderface, and Dr. Rockso; instead Toki Wartooth was sung by Mike Keneally (with Brendon Small singing young Toki), while Murderface and Dr. Rockso were briefly sung by Brendon Small.

== Release ==
It was speculated that the special would conclude the Metalocalypse series, as creator Brendon Small had stated in the past that his intention would be to do the fourth season and a movie and then end the show. However, due to the cliffhanger ending, it was revealed that the series would continue.

The special premiered on October 27, 2013, on Adult Swim, and the next day became available for download on Amazon Video.

In May 2015, this special became available for viewing on Hulu Plus.

On July 11, 2020, the episode, alongside the entire series, became available to watch on HBO Max.

On June 11th, 2021, The special became viewable for free on Channel 4 in the UK, categorised as 'Series 4 Episode 101'.

On August 15, 2023, the special was released as part of the Metalocalypse: The Complete Series DVD box set. However, due to a mastering error, some copies are missing the special. Warner Home Video offers a disc replacement program for affected copies.

== Soundtrack ==
On October 29, 2013, the score for the special was released on a full-length studio album by Dethklok. The album also includes "making of" feature. For the first time, Dethklok's live guitarist Mike Keneally is featured on a studio album. The first single off the album, "Blazing Star," was released on Loudwire on October 17, 2013.
