= Mark Brooks (director) =

American film director

- Born: May 7, 1970 (age 55); Denver, CO
- Occupations: Producer, director, writer, musician

Mark Brooks (born May 7, 1970) is an American producer, director, writer and musician known for his work on projects such as Metalocalypse, Moonbeam City and Serenity. He is a co-founding member of the electronic music group Night Club.

== Early life ==
Brooks was born and raised in Denver, Colorado. Using the pseudonym 3 Kord Scissor King, Brooks co-founded and played guitar for the influential punk band Warlock Pinchers while still in high school. The group disbanded in early 1992 when Brooks was 22 During college Brooks co-founded the band Foreskin 500 with Diggie Diamond in the mid-1990s. Initially just a duo with Diamond on vocals and Brooks playing everything else, the group eventually rounded out its lineup with Dave Kerr and Dave Moore.

== Directing career ==
In 1999, Brooks began his animation career in Los Angeles, co-founding the animation studio Gifted Men Productions. It was here where he co-created the animated shows Lil' Pimp and Creamburg, as well as directing The Slim Shady Show starring Eminem. Lil' Pimp would go on to become a feature film produced by Revolution Studios/Sony Pictures, co-written and directed by Brooks. The film featured Brooks in the lead role alongside William Shatner, Bernie Mac, Ludacris, and Lil' Kim. After Lil' Pimp was completed, Brooks began writing/directing TV shows such as Metalocalypse, Black Panther and Moonbeam City.

== Music career ==
In 2012, Brooks formed the electronic music band Night Club with Emily Kavanaugh. In 2017, Brooks produced and co-wrote "Tears in the Rain", "Wild Roses", "Edge of the Blade", "528hz" and "432hz" with Prayers for their Baptism of Thieves LP. Brooks' music has been featured in such films and television shows as The Fan, It's Always Sunny in Philadelphia, Mad Money, Bury the Bride, Moonbeam City, and The Riches.

== Filmography ==
=== Feature film ===
- Lil' Pimp – director, writer
- Serenity – Director for "Fruity Oaty Bar" sequence.
- Baton – Animation director

=== Television ===
- Metalocalypse (2006–13) – director, storyboards, writer
  - Metalocalypse: The Doomstar Requiem (2013) – story, director, editing
- Black Panther (2010) – director
- Moonbeam City (2015) – episode director
- Little Big Awesome (2016–18) – supervising director, episode director
- Momma Named Me Sheriff (2019) – episode director, season 1

=== Music videos ===
- Black Breath - "Home of the Grave"
- Burning Brides - "Love Sick"
- Danzig - "Danzig Legacy"
- Dethklok - "Castratikron"
- Dethklok - "Dethharmonic"
- Dethklok - "I Ejaculate Fire"
- Melvins - "Electric Flower"
- Melvins - "The War on Wisdom"
- Slayer - "Playing With Dolls"
- Slayer - "World Painted Blood"
