= Janine Ditullio =

American comedian

- Born: Massachusetts
- Citizenship: American
- Occupations: Comedy writer, voice actress, stand-up comedian
- Awards: Writers Guild of America Awards

Janine Ditullio is an American comedy writer, voice actress, and stand-up comedian. She has been nominated for six Emmy Awards and won two Writers Guild of America Awards for her writing on Late Night with Conan O'Brien .

== Career ==
As a stand-up comedian from Massachusetts, Ditullio has performed in the Boston area, including at the Catch a Rising Star club, several Boston First Night events, the Comedy Studio, and a fundraiser with Paula Poundstone, Jimmy Tingle, and Jonathan Katz for the Planned Parenthood League of Massachusetts. In New York City, she twice performed at the King Sized Laundromat and Dry Cleaners during Spin Cycle Comedy evenings in the late 1990s.

In 1994, Ditullio joined The Jon Stewart Show as a writer, and in 1995, then became a writer for Late Night with Conan O'Brien. She was the first woman hired as a writer at each show. She was a writer at Late Night with Conan O'Brien until 2001, and part of the team that wrote the nightly monologue. She also wrote for Late Night with Jimmy Fallon from May through November 2010.

She was also the voice of Paula Small in the animated series Home Movies, replacing the original voice actress, Paula Poundstone. She played a scientist who stabs monkeys on the Onion News Network. In 2012, she joined Superjail! as the writing director. Ditullio wrote the Metalocalypse episode "Dethmas" with show creator Brendon Small, along with several other scripts for seasons three and four of the series.

Both Ditullio and her writing partner Kelly Kimball served as co-executive producers on the short lived ABC series My Kind of Town starring Johnny Vaughan.

Ditullio is also the founder of Chirpbug, an interactive online technology.

== Awards and honors ==
Ditullio's awards
Year	Show	Award	Result	Ref.
1996	Late Night with Conan O'Brien	Primetime Emmy Award for Outstanding Writing for a Variety or Music Program	Nominee	
1996	Late Night with Conan O'Brien	Writers Guild of America Award for Television: Comedy-Variety Talk Series	Winner	
1997	Late Night with Conan O'Brien	Primetime Emmy Award for Outstanding Writing for a Variety or Music Program	Nominee	
1998	Late Night with Conan O'Brien	Primetime Emmy Award for Outstanding Writing for a Variety or Music Program	Nominee	
1998	Late Night with Conan O'Brien	Writers Guild of America Award for Television: Comedy-Variety Talk Series	Shortlist	
1999	Late Night with Conan O'Brien	Primetime Emmy Award for Outstanding Writing for a Variety or Music Program	Nominee	
1999	Late Night with Conan O'Brien	Writers Guild of America Award for Television: Comedy-Variety Talk Series	Winner	
2000	Late Night with Conan O'Brien	Primetime Emmy Award for Outstanding Writing for a Variety, Music, or Comedy Program	Nominee	
2000	Late Night with Conan O'Brien	Writers Guild of America Award for Television: Comedy-Variety Talk Series	Shortlist	
2001	Late Night with Conan O'Brien	Primetime Emmy Award for Outstanding Writing for a Variety, Music, or Comedy Program	Nominee	

== Filmography ==
Ditullio filmography
Year	Show	Role	Notes
1994–1995	The Jon Stewart Show	Writer	5 episodes
1995–2001	Late Night with Conan O'Brien	Writer	464 episodes
2001	Home Movies	Writer	7 episodes
2001–2004	Home Movies	Actress: Paula Small	47 episodes
2005	My Kind of Town	Head writer	5 episodes
2010	Late Night with Jimmy Fallon	Writer	84 episodes
2009–2010	Metalocalypse	Writer	14 episodes
2012	Superjail!	Writer	4 episodes
2012	Totally Biased with W. Kamau Bell	Producer	2 episodes
