= Metalocalypse =

American adult animated television series

- Genre: Adult animation; Musical; Black comedy; Satire
- Created by: Brendon Small; Tommy Blacha
- Written by: Tommy Blacha (seasons 1–2); Brendon Small; Various (seasons 3–4)
- Voices of: Brendon Small; Tommy Blacha; Mark Hamill; Victor Brandt; Malcolm McDowell
- Theme music composer: As Dethklok: Brendon Small; Gene Hoglan
- Opening theme: "Deththeme" by Dethklok
- Country of origin: United States
- Original language: English
- No. of seasons: 4
- No. of episodes: 61 (and 2 specials) (list of episodes)

Production
- Executive producers: Brendon Small; Tommy Blacha; Keith Crofford; Nick Weidenfeld; Mike Lazzo
- Producers: Keith Fay; Shannon Barrett Prynoski
- Running time: 11 minutes (Seasons 1–2, 4); 22 minutes (Season 3)
- Production companies: Titmouse, Inc.; Williams Street

Original release
- Network: Adult Swim
- Release: August 6, 2006 – October 27, 2013

Related
- Metalocalypse: The Doomstar Requiem; Metalocalypse: Army of the Doomstar

Metalocalypse is an American musical adult animated television series created by Brendon Small and Tommy Blacha for Adult Swim. It premiered on August 6, 2006. The television program centers on the larger-than-life melodic death metal band Dethklok, and often portrays dark and macabre content, including such subjects as violence, death, and the drawbacks of fame, with hyperbolic black comedy. The show was widely heralded as both a parody and a pastiche of heavy metal culture.

The music, written by guitarist/creator Brendon Small, was credited to the band and featured in most episodes. The animation was often carefully synced to the music with the chord positions and fingering of the guitar parts shown in some detail. The show was canceled in 2013. In 2021, Adult Swim announced a direct-to-video film had been greenlit; the film Metalocalypse: Army of the Doomstar was released on August 22, 2023, on Blu-ray and digital.

== Overview ==
In the series, Dethklok is a death metal band that enjoys a level of popularity unheard of in reality, ranking as the seventh-largest economy on Earth by the end of the second season. Series creator Small described them as "like the Beatles, just a thousand times more dangerous and a billion times more stupid".

The fictional band members are Nathan Explosion, Skwisgaar Skwigelf, Pickles, William Murderface and Toki Wartooth. Their manager is Charles Foster Offdensen.

If Dethklok endorses a product or service, competitors are quickly driven out of business. Organizations worldwide, ranging from governments to businesses, go out of their way to avoid hindering Dethklok, to the point that the band is allowed to maintain its own police force and can get away with any crime imaginable with virtually no repercussions. Despite their power, Dethklok's members are completely inept, possessing little to no common sense about daily life, being unable to even maintain relationships, handle finances, or even prepare their own meals.

The band's popularity is such that impressionable fans will do anything for them, even killing on their behalf. In the episode "Dethgov", fans of Dethklok lynch the governor of Florida after he refuses to establish a holiday for lead singer/native son Nathan Explosion, whom they elect as governor against his will; karma gets them in the end, as Dethklok turns the state into a hellhole and makes the citizens demand Nathan's execution in hypocrisy. Some groups and individuals actively seek to kill Dethklok, because of the death and destruction wrought by their idiocy.

The members of Dethklok tend to cause disaster wherever they travel, and anything remotely associated with them likewise attracts chaos. Dethklok concerts are so notoriously dangerous that those attending are required to sign "pain waivers" at the entrance, releasing the band from legal liability in the very likely case attendees are killed or maimed. The band is shown to have a callous disregard for the safety of their fans, as shown in the first episode where they pour scalding hot coffee over concertgoers.

The band's unnatural popularity and trail of destruction has attracted the attention of an Illuminati-style group, known as The Tribunal, dedicated to monitoring Dethklok's activity and plans. Typically, episodes involve the Tribunal attempting to maintain and perpetuate public ignorance and rampant consumerism whenever Dethklok's antics inadvertently threaten to upset the status quo. The Tribunal, led by a mysterious character named "Mr. Salacia", works off the premise that Dethklok's unusual powers are the result of an ancient Sumerian prophecy about an "Apocalypse of Metal". General Crozier, the military leader in the group, appears to desire either the death of the band's members or the dismantlement of the band itself, but Mr. Salacia consistently overrules him to prevent this from happening. Most episodes show the Tribunal attempting to covertly thwart the band by calling in various "specialists", such as "military pharmaceutical psychotropic drug manufacturers", "celebrity depression experts", or various legally compromised characters who attempt to infiltrate the group.

== Development ==
Brendon Small's show Home Movies ended its run in 2004, which freed Small to spend time with writer friend Tommy Blacha. They went to metal shows around the same time they were both trying to pitch shows to different networks. This was how they came up with the idea of doing a show about a metal band that was vastly more popular than The Beatles had been. They came up with the storyline, wrote a theme song, and had a friend Jon Schnepp design the characters. The series was originally called Deathclock, but the name could not be used due to an existing trademark. The show and the main characters' band were then renamed Dethklok. The show's title was then extended to Dethklok Metalocalypse, although the starring band still retained the name Dethklok. The title was finally shortened to Metalocalypse because the extended show title was too complicated. They pitched the show to Adult Swim, which greenlit it in 2005 with a 20-episode contract.

In developing the series, Small looked at the budget for what he considered to be the cheapest show to produce at the time on Adult Swim, Tom Goes to the Mayor. On asking Tim and Eric, who produced the show, Small discovered that their budget was $110,000 per episode. Small then went to Titmouse and asked if they could do Metalocalypse for under $110,000 per episode while still maintaining Small's vision. Titmouse responded they could do it for $109,099 per episode averaged over the entire season.

== Broadcast history ==
The show's first season consists of 20 11-minute episodes, the first of which premiered on the Adult Swim Video on August 4, 2006, and on Adult Swim proper the following Sunday. Metalocalypse was renewed for a second season consisting of 19 episodes which began airing on September 23, 2007, two days before the CD release of The Dethalbum. The second season also introduced an updated version of the show's opening theme (officially titled "Deththeme"), which had been rerecorded for The Dethalbum. The Metalocalypse premiere was the #1 rated show in its time slot among males aged 18–34 and earned the network's best premiere delivery and ratings in 2006. Among the top ad-supported basic cable programs of the week, Metalocalypse ranked #12 among men 18–34 and #6 among men 18–24. The series premiere ranked #30 for the week among older teenagers and young adults 18–34.

At San Diego Comic-Con in 2008, Tommy Blacha confirmed that the show would be renewed for a third season which premiered on November 8, 2009. The episodes of season three are 21 minutes long (30 minutes including commercials).

The fourth season returned to the original 11 minute run-time. Season four premiered April 29, 2012, and consisted of 12 episodes.

Actor Mark Hamill stated in 2013 that the fifth season of the show was currently in production. Brendon Small later denied this, stating that it had not yet reached production.

On May 10, 2013, Brendon Small and Adult Swim announced that a Metalocalypse one-hour rock opera special, Metalocalypse: The Doomstar Requiem, was in the works. This special aired on October 27, 2013.

In April 2014, in an interview on Steve Agee: Uhhh podcast, Brendon Small stated that a fifth and final season was in pre-production and that he was waiting on a budget from Adult Swim. Small has since stated that he has begun exploring other ways of concluding the show, which may take the form of a special or a film, and that he was in the early stages of planning.

=== Cancellation ===
In March 2015, Brendon Small issued a statement saying that he had approached Adult Swim with the idea to do the finale as a "big mini-series", but was turned down by the network. It was later revealed that Metalocalypse had been canceled; however, Small tweeted that he has plans "to service a final story and music—but not in way fans are used to".

In October 2015, Small announced a month-long social campaign, called "Metalocalypse Now", to have fans of the show contact Hulu and Adult Swim to convince them to co-fund the series finale to Metalocalypse, entitled Metalocalypse: The Army of the Doomstar – The Final Chapter. As a result of the campaign, financial backers stepped forward to fund a final season, but Adult Swim declined to pick up the series. In a May 2016 interview, Small said he is "all but finished making Dethklok records".

=== Revival film ===
In May 2021 it was announced that a direct-to-video film was in production; it was announced that the film would also be released on HBO Max, but it was later dropped from that initial release commitment.

In April 2023, it was announced that Small would write and direct the previously scrapped Metalocalypse: Army of the Doomstar. The film has a voice cast of many actors and metal musicians. Dethklok recorded the soundtrack for the film along with a new album. The film was released on August 22, 2023, on Blu-ray and digital.

== Voice cast ==
=== Main cast members ===
Brendon Small
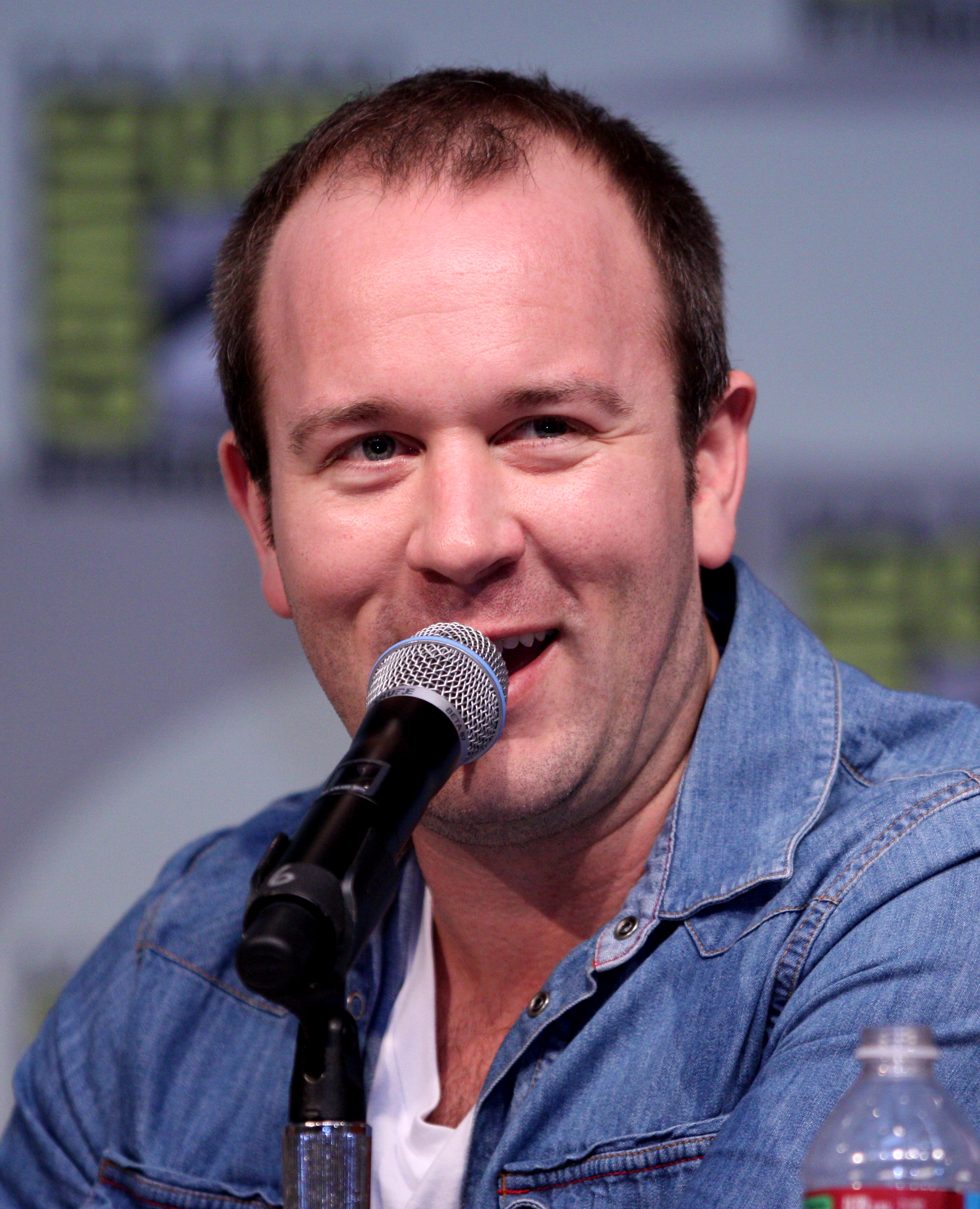
- Nathan Explosion
- Skwisgaar Skwigelf
- Pickles the Drummer
- Charles Foster Offdensen
- Various
Tommy Blacha
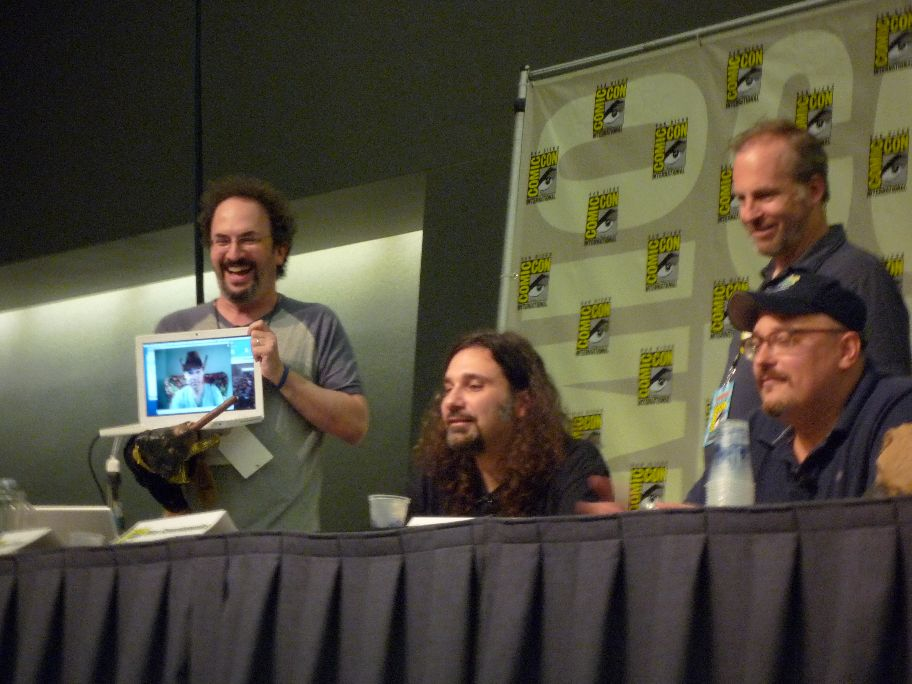
- Toki Wartooth
- William Murderface
- Dr. Rockso
- Various
Mark Hamill
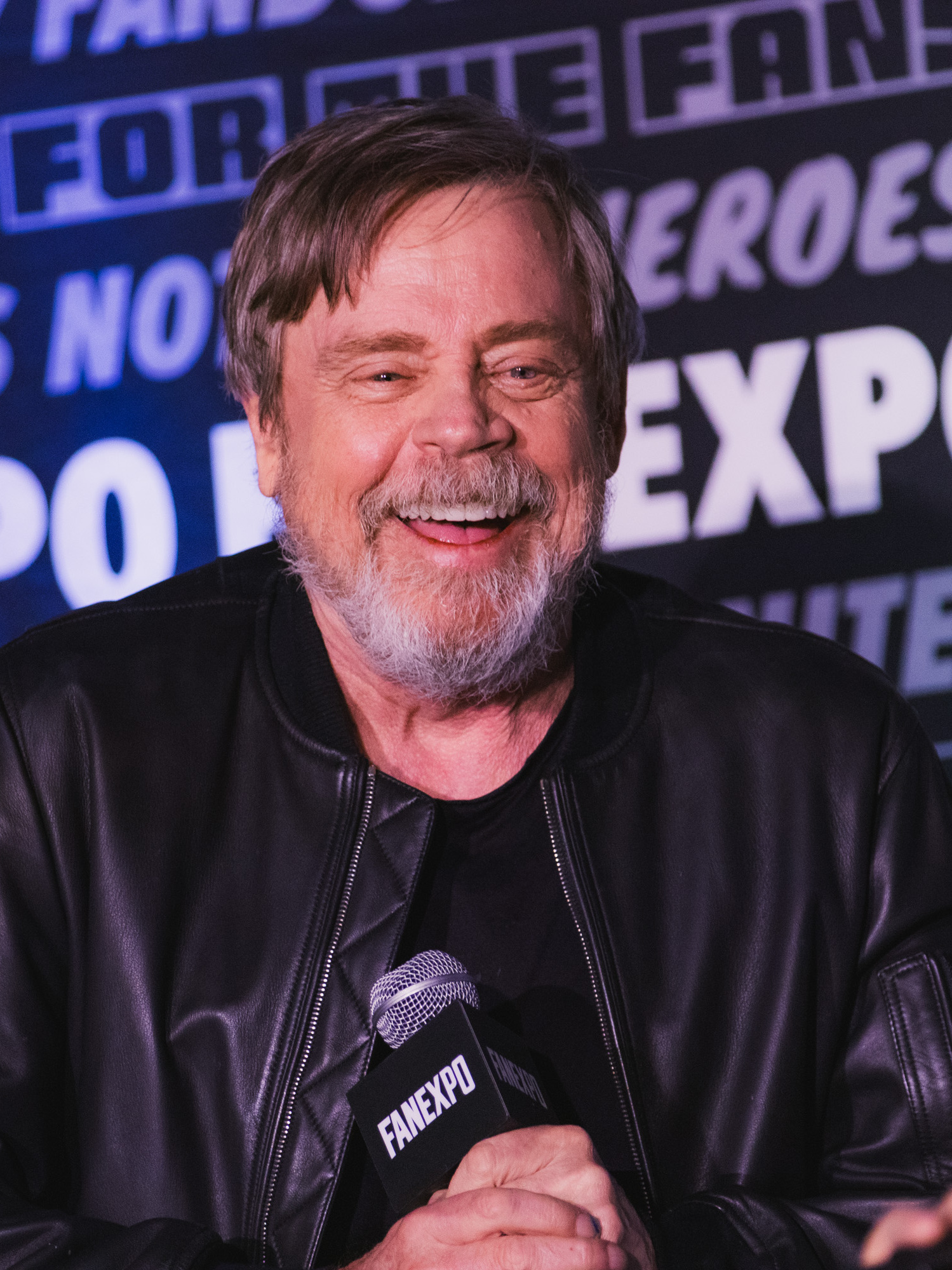
- Senator Stampingston
- Mr. Salacia
- Jean-Pierre
- Roy Cornickelson
- News Anchor
- Various
Victor Brandt
- General Crozier
- Cardinal Ravenwood
- News Anchor
- Various
Malcolm McDowell
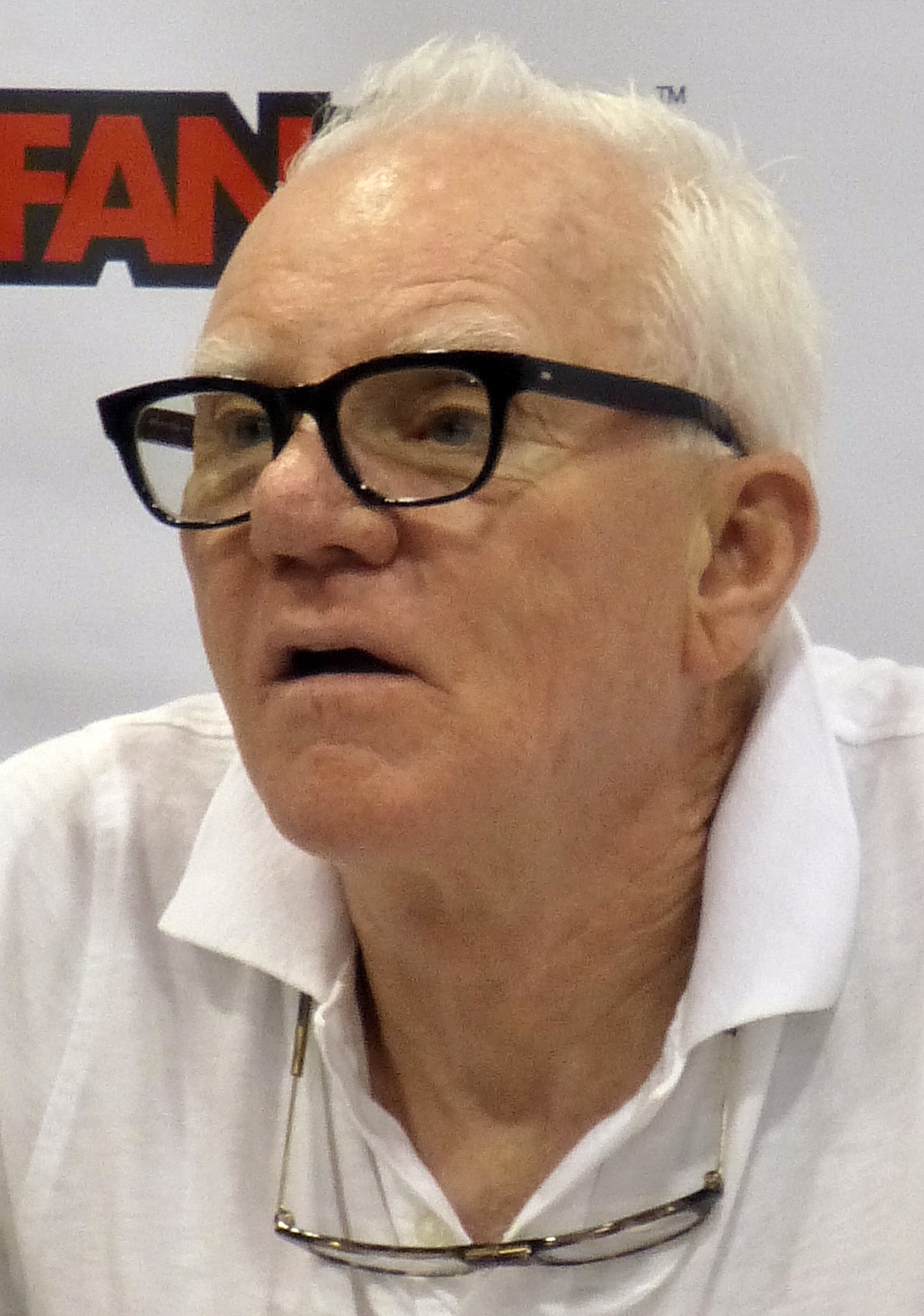
- Vater Orlaag
- News Anchor
- Various

=== Guest stars ===
==== Musicians ====
- Michael Amott
- Asesino
  - Dino Cazares
  - Tony Campos
  - Emilio Márquez
- Jack Black
- Richard Christy
- Emperor
  - Ihsahn
  - Samoth
  - Trym Torson
- Enslaved
  - Arve Isdal
  - Grutle Kjellson
- Herbrand Larsen
- Exodus
  - Lee Altus
  - Rob Dukes
  - Jack Gibson
  - Gary Holt
  - Tom Hunting
- George "Corpsegrinder" Fisher
- Ace Frehley
- Marty Friedman
- Billy Gibbons
- Angela Gossow
- Dave Grohl
- Gene Hoglan
- Scott Ian
- Mike Keneally
- King Diamond
- Amy Lee
- Mastodon
  - Brann Dailor
  - Brent Hinds
  - Troy Sanders
- Metallica
  - Kirk Hammett
  - James Hetfield
- Marco Minnemann
- Nevermore
  - Warrel Dane
  - Jeff Loomis
  - Steve Smyth
- Mike Patton
- Matt Pike
- Cam Pipes
- Joe Satriani
- Silenoz
- Slash
- Soundgarden
  - Ben Shepherd
  - Kim Thayil
- Thundercat
- Devin Townsend
- Steve Vai
- ICS Vortex
- Dweezil Zappa
- Livia Zita

==== Other guest stars ====
Besides the metal and rock musicians above, other celebrities have also contributed to this show, including:

- Samantha Eggar
- Chris Elliott
- Janeane Garofalo
- Jon Hamm
- Pat Healy
- Werner Herzog
- Frankie Ingrassia
- Marc Maron
- Christopher McCulloch
- Juliet Mills
- Byron Minns
- Laraine Newman
- Patton Oswalt
- "Dr. Drew" Pinsky
- Brian Posehn
- Andy Richter
- Laura Silverman
- Amber Tamblyn
- James Urbaniak
- Raya Yarbrough

== Characters ==
=== Dethklok ===
Dethklok is a world-renowned metal band, described by their adversaries, the Tribunal, as the "world's greatest cultural force." The band has five members: frontman and lead vocalist Nathan Explosion, lead guitarist Skwisgaar Skwigelf, rhythm guitarist Toki Wartooth, drummer "Pickles the drummer", and bassist William Murderface.

The band's fan base includes billions of metal fanatics, who frequently endanger themselves to watch the band perform live. With their widespread commercial success and lucrative sponsorship contracts, Dethklok is ranked as the world's seventh largest economy by the end of the second season.

The members of Dethklok are often portrayed as incompetent at almost everything not directly related to their profession. The band struggles to perform everyday tasks, including shopping for groceries, preparing food, and maintaining proper social relationships.

=== The Tribunal ===
The Tribunal in their meeting room in Season 1. Extreme left: General Crozier; Center: Mr. Salacia; Right of center: Cardinal Ravenwood; Inset: Senator Stampingston.

The Tribunal is an Illuminati-style group which monitors Dethklok. They appear in almost every episode to discuss Dethklok's latest activities and the dangers they pose. They seem to fear that Dethklok are part of an ancient Sumerian prophecy, culminating in an "apocalypse of metal."

==== Senator Stampingston ====
Senator Stampingston (voiced by Mark Hamill) is the main speaker who reports on Dethklok's current activities. He has a diplomatic standpoint for the issues against Dethklok, often recommending espionage and other forms of information gathering. He keeps a professional and calm attitude towards Dethklok; he knows they are a threat, but he never overreacts and he is rarely the one who comes up with ideas.

==== General Crozier ====
General Crozier (voiced by Victor Brandt) is the main villain of the first season and a four-star General in the United States Army; as of the end of Season 2, he has become Chairman of the Joint Chiefs of Staff. His job in the Tribunal, as stated by Mr. Salacia, is information gathering, which Crozier is not happy about. He brings a military viewpoint to the Tribunal's dealings with Dethklok, and usually recommends military action, often in the form of assassination. In the second season, Crozier falls under Salacia's control and gathers his forces to set up the Falconback Project. In the movie finale, "The Army of the Doomstar", Crozier realizes that he has been manipulated and orders his soldiers to switch sides and take out the Tribunal forces.

==== Cardinal Ravenwood ====
Cardinal Ravenwood (voiced by Victor Brandt) is an elderly priest who had a religious perspective on the issues regarding Dethklok. He claimed to have prophetic visions on a regular basis, most of which related to Dethklok; however, they did not appear to be very reliable, or at the very least not as literal as he explained them. Though his visions did not usually end up accurate, he did accurately foretell his own death. In the season 1 finale, Salacia discovers Ravenwood and Crozier's attack on Dethklok, and uses his telekinetic powers to kill Ravenwood by making him vomit out his intestines.

==== Vater Orlaag ====
Vater Orlaag (voiced by Malcolm McDowell) is introduced in the second episode of the second season, presumably having been taken on to replace Ravenwood. He seems to either hold a high military rank or maintain a private army. Orlaag is later revealed to have been working for Salacia.

==== Mr. Salacia ====
Mr. Salacia (voiced by Mark Hamill) is the oldest and most powerful member of the Tribunal. When the Tribunal debates the best course of action, Mr. Salacia is usually the last to speak, and always has the final word on what course of action the group will take. Oddly enough, he usually recommends inaction, ordering the Tribunal to allow what is occurring to take place undisturbed. Salacia possesses a variety of powers ranging from telekinesis and mind control to flight, size changing, and lightning manipulation. Near the end of Season 4, with Dethklok disbanding, Salacia decides to finally make his move during the band's final concert in Iceland, killing a portion of the audience as well as Roy Cornickelson. After Offdensen facilitates Dethklok's escape, he reveals that Salacia is "not like us", referring to him as "The Half-Man."

=== Dethklok employees ===
==== Charles Foster Offdensen ====
Charles Foster Offdensen (voiced by Brendon Small) is Dethklok's manager, legal counsel, and Chief Financial Officer, the latter also incidentally being his initials. He acts as manager, lawyer, and advisor to Dethklok, protecting the band against everything from slowing record sales to themselves. Offdensen uses high-tech radar and surveillance to monitor the band's safety, and activates cutting edge defenses when Dethklok is attacked.

In season 2, Offdensen is targeted by the Metal-Masked Assassin after stopping him from killing Dethklok. In reality, having witnessed Salacia brainwashing General Crozier, Offdensen had his soul separated from his body. However, the Church of the Black Klok saved him and reunited with his soul. Offdensen is labeled as "The Dead Man" and can no longer be seen by Salacia, who sees him as a major threat.

In Metalocalypse: The Doomstar Requiem, Offdensen resigns from his position as Manager and CFO of Dethklok, and becomes the new High Holy Priest of the Church of the Black Klok, after the death of Ishnifus Meaddle.

==== Klokateers ====
A Klokateer, specifically 421

Klokateers are the slavishly devoted servants of Dethklok, providing for their every need, such as maintaining the band's various properties, serving as soldiers and bodyguards, and performing as roadies for their concerts and their own personal military and police force. They wear black hoods and black, sleeveless uniforms, and in general resemble medieval executioners. The Klokateers obey Dethklok without question, no matter how outrageous the demand, and are willing to give up their lives for the band. Even before they are officially hired, they are quite likely to die. The entrance exam alone has a mortality rate of fifty percent, as the participants are required to pair up and fight to the death.

For the live band, Dethklok's roadies are often dressed in the same fashion as the Klokateers, with a black garb wrapped around their head to achieve a similar look.

==== Jean-Pierre ====
Jean-Pierre, before his accident (left) and after (right)

Jean-Pierre (voiced by Mark Hamill) is Dethklok's French chef, the most recent in a long line to cater to the band. He is passionately loyal to his employers despite the job's inherent risks. All chefs previously employed by Dethklok died in various incidents.

In the pilot episode, Jean-Pierre is mangled when a stray firework missile ejects him from the Dethcopter and into its rotor blades. The band incompetently sews his body back together, giving him a grotesque and mutilated appearance. Jean-Pierre returned to work enthusiastically, and his current condition does not appear to have adversely affected his skills as a chef.

==== Dick "Magic Ears" Knubbler ====
Dick Knubbler (voiced by Brendon Small) is Dethklok's music producer/engineer. He has a criminal history; among his laundry list of felonies are tax evasion, disfiguring a co-worker's face with acid, soliciting prostitution and drugs. Initially working for the Tribunal to clear his record, he instead fell in love with Dethklok's music. His eyes exploded from a rapid decompression accident, and were replaced with robotic eyes. Knubbler has continued as Dethklok's patient producer, avoiding accidents since then.

==== Dr. Johnathan Twinkletits ====
Dr. Johnathan Twinkletits (voiced by Brendon Small) is an insane band therapist, and parody of performance coach Phil Towle and producer Bob Rock. He was formerly a member of a 1980s pop band known as the Amazelingtons, whom he killed. He is later hired by Dethklok to help them get along with each other until he tries to nudge his way into Dethklok, fired before his attempt to murder them results with him falling through a window into a pit of wolves who rip his arms off. He has since returned as a therapist for Mordhaus, having obtained robotic arms.

==== Dethklok's doctor ====
Dethklok meets a certain unnamed doctor (voiced by Tommy Blacha) at various points in the series. The doctor usually does whatever Dethklok asks, despite the fact that they ask him to do things any ordinary doctor would never consider including the assumably forced castration of "Fat Kid", the band's adopted son. He usually responds to their requests with a dejected "whatever."

==== Facebones ====
Facebones (voiced by Brendon Small) is an animated version of the Dethklok logo, with a twisted jaw and visible brain. Facebones speaks in a high-pitched voice that occasionally modulates into something deeper and more demonic.

Outside of fiction, Facebones is used to host video segments in interludes at Dethklok's live concerts. The videos are projected onto a large screen and provide mock 'behind-the-scenes' information.

==== #216 ====
216 is a Klokateer with dwarfism. Introduced in "Murdering outside the Box", he gets into a scuffle with a disguised Agent 216 (an assassin sent by General Crozier to kill Dethklok) over who had won the company's raffle draw. The resulting fight between the two leads to #216 being severely injured. By the events of "The Metalocalypse Has Begun", #216 has fully recovered from his injuries and partakes in the massive battle between General Crozier's armed forces and the Klokateer Army.

==== Mordhaus Scientists ====
The Mordhaus scientists (voiced by Brendon Small and Tommy Blacha) are two scientists who work for Dethklok and create technology for them. They frequently display an inability to present information in an organized manner, often interrupting each other and talking at the same time when explaining new technologies that they have developed.

==== Abigail Remeltindtdrinc ====
Abigail Remeltnidtdrinc (voiced by Janeane Garofalo; singing voice provided by Raya Yarbrough) is a new producer for Dethklok who is hired after Crystal Mountain Records is unhappy with the performance of Dick Knubbler. In the episode "Going Downklok", Nathan and Pickles develop a rivalry over their attractive co-worker. During the band's recording segregation, Nathan goes down on Abigail in the heat of the moment, but she expresses regret and quickly leaves. Pickles has a meltdown and quits the band, setting the stage for Dethklok's breakup and Salacia's rise.

=== Recurring characters ===
==== Dr. Rockso ====
Dr. Rockso (voiced by Tommy Blacha; singing voice provided by Brendon Small) is a self-described "rock and roll clown". He is known for his frequent use of drugs, excessive lifestyle, and his trademark introduction and catchphrase: "I'm Dr. Rockso, the rock and roll clown! I do cocaine!". Rockso's real name is Leonard Rockstein; the son of a physical therapist. Rockso began his music career as the lead singer of Zazz Blammymatazz, a partying glam-rock band named after the guitarist, Bink Bonk Blammymatazz. The band quickly became successful; however, Rockso insisted on being paid in cocaine, and was fired for his violent and erratic behavior. After a short-lived solo career, he began his present life working as a clown for parties.

According to Brendon Small, Rockso was supposed to be an amalgam of every kind of front man from the hard-rock era, including Vince Neil, Axl Rose, and Bret Michaels. Eventually, the animators made him resemble David Lee Roth.

==== Dethklok Minute Host ====
The Dethlok Minute Host (voiced by Tommy Blacha) is the host of The Dethklok Minute, a series that focuses on Dethklok's usual celebrity stunts such as TV appearances, movies, romances, rumors, and so on. In the episode "P.R. Klok", the right side of the host's face is disfigured when a meteor fragment strikes his studio. Prior to his disfigurement, the host bore a strong resemblance to Mark McGrath, although the initial character design was based on the shows producer Keith Fay.

==== Ishnifus Meaddle ====
Ishnifus Meaddle (voiced by Werner Herzog; singing voice by Brendon Small) is the High Holy Priest to the Church of the Black Klok. Throughout the fourth season of the series, he gives narration and dictates prophecies regarding Dethklok. In Metalocalypse: The Doomstar Requiem, he helps Dethklok in their search for Toki. During Dethklok's encounter with the Metal Masked Assassin he sacrifices himself to create a distraction so Dethklok can escape. He is subsequently beheaded by the Metal Masked Assassin and crucified.

==== Pickles' Family ====
Pickles' family resides in Tomahawk, Wisconsin. His parents are Calvert (voiced by Matt Pike) and Molly (voiced by Laraine Newman), who very obviously favor Pickles' brother Seth (voiced by Brendon Small) due to the fact that he is more easily controlled than his financially independent brother. Seth is an ex-con, has no known job, and lives in his parents' garage, and later in a "house room" in their attic. While Pickles initially tried to earn his mother's affection by becoming the best real estate agent in the country, he eventually takes his bandmates' advice and stops caring what she thinks, coming out much better for it. Seth constantly tries to make money from Pickles' fame, even threatening Pickles with identity theft. Eventually Seth is made head of Dethklok Australia, mostly out of Pickles' hatred: the previous managers had been murdered. Seth reallocates Australia's resources to protect himself, leaving most of Australia in chaos.

==== Toki's Family ====
Toki's parents are Anja Wartooth and the now deceased Reverend Aslaug Wartooth, two extremely religious people who never speak, smile, or show any emotion whatsoever. They live in an abandoned village near Lillehammer, Norway. They were very harsh and even cruel to Toki during his childhood, forcing him to perform incredibly strenuous tasks for a child such as moving rocks, symmetrically stacking huge amounts of firewood and "sweepings the snow". They would reprimand Toki for the slightest mistakes with beatings and solitary confinement in a "punishment hole". This harsh childhood is implied to be why Toki acts the way he does, using his newfound fiscal independence as a member of Dethklok to live out the childhood he wished he had.

==== Snakes N' Barrels ====
Snakes N' Barrels (SnB) is Pickles' first band, all of whom (aside from Pickles) fell on hard times after Pickles went to Dethklok. The name of the band is a reference to the band Guns N' Roses. In season 3 the former members of the Dethklok tribute band Thunderhorse have made a Snakes N' Barrels cover band called Serpents N' Containers. Despite being Dethklok's drummer, Pickles was SnB's lead singer and occasional rhythm guitarist.

- Antonio "Tony" DiMarco Thunderbottom (voiced by Michael Amott) is the bassist. He is a former alcoholic and drug addict turned sober.
- Sammy "Candynose" Twinskins (voiced by Warrel Dane) is the drummer. He was formerly addicted to crack cocaine, but has since become sober.
- Snizzy "Snazz" Bullets (voiced by Steve Smyth) is the rhythm guitar player. He suffers from partial facial paralysis due to hallucinogens and heroin abuse; he is currently sober. Bullets is bald and bears scars from a botched hair transplant on his head.
- Rikki Kixx (voiced by Mike Patton) is Pickles' replacement in the band. He hates the "living hell" that is sobriety and only promotes it just so people can suffer like he does.

==== Roy Cornickelson ====
Roy Cornickelson (voiced by Mark Hamill) is the president of Crystal Mountain Records, the record company that publishes Dethklok, and one of the few people on Earth still powerful enough to have control over Dethklok. At the beginning of Season 3, he appears to be deathly ill and his son Damien is running Crystal Mountain in his place, using the label and Offdensen's absence to get revenge on Dethklok for humiliating him years ago. By the episode "Dethsiduals", Cornickelson has recovered and resumed his position as head of the company. After Mr. Salacia reveals his existence to Dethklok at the end of "Breakupklok", Cornickelson confronts him and is killed.

=== The Revengencers ===
The Revengencers is an anti-Dethklok terrorist group formed by Edgar Jomfru and the Metal Masked Assassin in an attempt to exact revenge against Dethklok for the pain they have caused them (both their younger brothers were killed by Dethklok's minions). Though the organization was seemingly destroyed at the end of the second season, the Revengencers reappear in season four.

==== Metal Masked Assassin ====
The Metal Masked Assassin (voiced by George "Corpsegrinder" Fisher) is the brother of Agent 216. Having been a psychopath all his life, having no family save his brother, he wears a metal mask and regularly dismembers people while they are still alive. While attacking the Dethwater concert, the Assassin is intercepted by Offdensen, who breaks his arm, stabs him with his own weapon, and kicks him into the water nearby.

The Metal-Masked Assassin returns as the primary villain of the second season, now wearing a metal brace on his elbow and with a consuming hatred towards Offdensen, whom he wants to suffer before killing him. He becomes a founding member of the Revengencers. He serves as the main antagonist of Metalocalypse: The Doomstar Requiem, where he is seen working with Hammersmith and plans to kill Dethklok inside his lair. The Assassin is killed by Dethklok who, upon rescuing Toki, destroy him while empowered by the Doomstar.

==== Edgar Jomfru ====
Edgar Jomfru (voiced by Brendon Small) and his brother Eric (voiced by Tommy Blacha) are introduced as the proprietors of diefordethklok.com, the largest Dethklok fan site. As revealed in Metalocalypse: The Doomstar Requiem, Edgar lost the use of his legs due to a car accident that occurred while he and his brother were returning from a Dethklok concert. In their greed, the brothers attempt to blackmail Dethklok into paying for good reviews on their site by secretly recording an exclusive one-time only song, "Fansong", played by Dethklok during their annual fan day. Their scheme fails miserably when the two brothers are lured into a sniper-filled hallway by Offdensen. Eric is killed instantly; Edgar survives, but is imprisoned in Dethklok's dungeon.

Edgar returns in the second season as the secondary villain of the season. The shock of his brother's death, as well as the brutal torture inflicted upon him by the band's minions, drives Edgar insane. After escaping prison, Edgar becomes a founding member of the Revengencers and begins orchestrating terrorist attacks on Dethklok.

In the fourth season, Edgar searches for information regarding the prophecy surrounding Dethklok and eventually discovers that Dethklok "must go into the water". Though he despised Dethklok, especially their refusal to accept Toki as a brother, Edgar provided the band with gadgets to use for the rescue mission during the events of Metalocalypse: The Doomstar Requiem.

==== The Teenager ====
The Teenager (voiced by Tommy Blacha) is an unnamed teenager who was imprisoned and tortured by Klokateers after illegally downloading Dethklok music. There, he meets Edgar, who makes him wear a mask made of Eric Jomfru's face and refers to him as his brother. He joins the Revengencers with Edgar, never speaking and obeying Edgar without question.

==== Lavona Succuboso ====
Lavona Succuboso (voiced by Angela Gossow) is the leader of Succuboso Explosion, an extremist faction of women devoted to capturing Nathan Explosion and bearing his children, creating a race of warriors that will conquer the world. Their mantra is "We are the vessels that hold the future." They use a device called the "loin extractor" which is a harpoon-like projectile that attaches to the target's crotch and electrocutes them. In the episode "Black Fire Upon Us", Lavona and her followers ally themselves with the Revengencers to help them attack Mordhaus during their CD release party. It is unclear whether or not she escaped the inferno of Mordhaus alive.

==== Magnus Hammersmith ====
Magnus Hammersmith (voiced by Marc Maron; singing voice provided by Brendon Small) is a previous guitarist for Dethklok, holding the writing credits for the song "The Hammer" on Dethalbum III. Magnus is first briefly seen in the episode "RenovationKlok" where he is present in a flashback when the band first signs to Crystal Mountain Records. He appears again in the episode "Dethcamp" where it is revealed that Magnus was egomaniacal and kicked out of the band after a fight with Nathan Explosion. The day after he was kicked out, Magnus trashed his former bandmates' equipment with writing "Revenge is coming" on the wall in blood. While Magnus works as a counsellor in Roc-a-Rooni Fantasy Camp, he becomes friends with his replacement Toki Wartooth, who attends the camp in a desperate attempt to make friends. Though he appeared to have reconciled with Dethklok, Magnus is revealed to be a member of the Revengencers. In "Church of the Black Klok", Magnus reveals his true colors while stabbing Toki, but keeps him alive alongside Abigail so he can exact his revenge on Dethklok. However, impaled by the Assassin after questioning his choice to kill Ishnifus, Magnus witnesses the true power that Dethklok holds. Realizing that he was the villain all along for kidnapping Toki, Magnus commits suicide to repent for his actions.

== Episodes ==
| Season | Episodes | Originally released | |
| Season | Episodes | First released | Last released |
|---|---|---|---|
| 1 | 20 | August 6, 2006 | December 17, 2006 |
| 2 | 19 | September 23, 2007 | September 7, 2008 |
| 3 | 10 | November 8, 2009 | October 24, 2010 |
| 4 | 12 | April 29, 2012 | July 15, 2012 |
| Special | | October 27, 2013 | |

== International broadcast ==
In Canada, Metalocalypse previously aired on Teletoon's Teletoon at Night block and later G4's Adult Digital Distraction block. The series currently airs on the Canadian version of Adult Swim.

== Music ==
The show includes music written under the name Dethklok by Brendon Small, often in the form of incidental music, and songs about the subjects of the episode in which they are featured, although three albums have since been released compiling full songs from the show. An EP titled Adult Swim Presents: ...And You Will Know Us by the Trail of Dead on Tour with Dethklok was released in 2007.

=== The Dethalbum ===
The Dethalbum was released on September 25, 2007, in both standard and deluxe editions. The album is a combination of full-length tracks from the series and completely new songs. The album debuted at #21 on the Billboard 200 chart with nearly 34,000 copies sold in its first week. The Dethalbum was also streamed 45,000 times when it went live on AOL Music during the week of its release.

=== Dethalbum II ===
Dethalbum II was released on September 29, 2009, in both standard and deluxe editions. The album includes many songs from the second season of the series and completely new songs. The deluxe version includes a DVD containing music videos for all the songs played during Dethklok's 2008 tour with Soilent Green and Chimaira.

=== Dethalbum III ===
Dethalbum III was released on October 16, 2012. The album features Brendon Small, Gene Hoglan and Bryan Beller. Ulrich Wild co-produced and mixed the album.

=== The Doomstar Requiem ===
The Doomstar Requiem was released on October 29, 2013. It is the soundtrack album to the Metalocalypse special Metalocalypse: The Doomstar Requiem. The album features Brendon Small, Bryan Beller, Gene Hoglan, a 50-piece orchestra and, for the first time on a Dethklok album, live Dethklok guitarist Mike Keneally. The series has been made available for on-demand streaming on Hulu Plus, as part of a deal made with Hulu and Turner Broadcasting.

=== Dethalbum IV ===
Dethalbum IV was released on August 22, 2023, alongside the film Metalocalypse: Army of the Doomstar.

== Endorsements ==
Dethklok, the in-show band, also endorses several real-world music products, including Marshall Amplification, Gibson guitars, EMG pickups, David Eden Amplification, Universal Audio, M-Audio, Dunlop Manufacturing/MXR, and Line 6 gear.

Originally endorsing Krank Amplification, Brendon Small and Dethklok began an arrangement with Marshall in 2009.

According to the official Dethklok MySpace, the Gibson Guitar Corporation was also planning on making a Dethklok signature guitar. During the 2008 NAMM Show, a special edition Epiphone Explorer was unveiled to a select few. Pictures of show creator Brendon Small holding the guitar can be seen on the internet. Small later confirmed that Gibson, not Epiphone, would be releasing a Dethklok Explorer. A Dethklok "Thunderhorse" Explorer has been released by Gibson; it would later become Skwisgaar's main guitar on the show. In May 2012, Brendon Small revealed a prototype for the new Brendon Small "Snow Falcon" Flying V, it now serves as Toki Wartooth's primary guitar on the show. The guitar was released in December 2013 by Gibson. In December 2016, an Epiphone version was released.

At the NAMM Show in January 2013, Brendon Small revealed that an Epiphone version of the Dethklok "Thunderhorse" Explorer was in production. It was released in April 2013 as the Brendon Small "Thunderhorse" Explorer.

On October 25, 2014, Brendon Small premiered the prototype of the Gibson Dethklok "Snow Horse" Explorer, a silver burst Gibson Explorer modelled after one of Skwisgaar's guitars.

In 2007, Shocker Toys produced a limited run of statues of William Murderface and Nathan Explosion. In 2008 and again in 2009, Shocker Toys made a boxed set of vinyl figures with limited articulation of all 5 of the band members. Kid Robot produced unarticulated figures of Murderface and Toki as part of an Adult Swim blind boxed mini figure line. At the 2009 San Diego Comic-Con, Shocker Toys released an exclusive limited edition Dr. Rockso Mallow.

The song "Thunderhorse" is featured in the game Guitar Hero II by Harmonix and RedOctane as a bonus song. In early 2010, Adult Swim released a "Dethklok Fountain" for sale on their website for $40,000. In January 2010, "Laser Canon Deth Sentence" became a downloadable song for Guitar Hero 5. "Bloodlines" is on the main setlist in Guitar Hero: Warriors of Rock.

Dethklok was featured in Soundgarden's video for "Black Rain", which Small directed. Dethklok's 2009 tour with Mastodon was sponsored by Brütal Legend and the song "Murmaider" was featured in the game. The song "The Cyborg Slayers" was featured in the soundtrack for the game Saints Row: The Third.

There are guitar tablature books for all three Dethklok albums, which were released through Alfred Publishing. A bass tab anthology containing tablature from the first two albums was also released through Alfred Publishing. The production of these books has subsequently led to the removal of all Dethklok tabs from websites such as Ultimate Guitar.

On August 17, 2012, a two-minute animated short aired on Adult Swim featuring Dethklok and Death from Darksiders II, in promotion of the game.

On September 25, 2013, an animated short featuring Dethklok, entitled "'Tallica Parking Lot" (a reference to Heavy Metal Parking Lot), premiered at Fantastic Fest.

On April 28, 2015, the Dethklok songs "Awaken", "Go into the Water" and "Thunderhorse" became available for download in the video game Rocksmith 2014 as part of the "Dethklok 3-Song Pack". Small appeared in an advert for the game in 2016 along with comedian Steve Agee playing the song "Go into the Water". Later, on April 3, 2018, the songs "Black Fire Upon Us", "Bloodlines" and "Murmaider" were added as part of the "Dethklok II" song pack.

== Touring history ==
Dethklok does have a touring band, although there are no actual human counterparts to the characters on the show. The band consists of show co-creator, vocalist/guitarist Brendon Small, who writes and sings most of the music for the show, alongside drummer Gene Hoglan, bassist Pete Griffin, and second guitarist Nili Brosh.

== Home media release ==
| Season | Episodes | DVD release dates | | | Blu-ray release dates | |
| Season | Episodes | Region 1 | Region 2 | Region 4 | Region A | Region B |
|---|---|---|---|---|---|---|
| 1 | 20 | October 2, 2007 | June 22, 2009 | December 5, 2007 | —N/a | —N/a |
| 2 | 19 | December 2, 2008 | October 11, 2010 | December 3, 2008 | —N/a | —N/a |
| 3 | 10 | November 9, 2010 | March 21, 2011 | December 1, 2010 | November 9, 2010 | December 1, 2010 |
| 4 | 12 | October 30, 2012 | —N/a | December 5, 2012 | October 30, 2012 | December 5, 2012 |
| Special | 1 | August 15, 2023 (Note: Included in Metalocalypse: The Complete Series set.) | —N/a | October 21, 2015 | —N/a | October 21, 2015 |
| Film | 1 | August 22, 2023 | —N/a | —N/a | August 22, 2023 | —N/a |

== Video games ==
In 2009 the UK Adult Swim site released two flash games titled Deth Toll and Deth Toll II. The games are played in a similar fashion to Guitar Hero or Rock Band except with Dethklok songs.

A video game based on the series, titled Metalocalypse: Dethgame, was revealed at the 2009 San Diego Comic-Con. The game was to be published by Konami and be available for download on both the PlayStation 3's PlayStation Network and Xbox 360's Xbox Live Marketplace. Players would have played as one of The Gears, and the game was to be set in Mordhaus, where the player would fight mutant fans. The game would have included music taken from Dethklok's albums. The game has been canceled, because "the creative direction of the game would not live up to the high standards...set for the project".

The Dethklok songs "Thunderhorse" and "Bloodlines" are featured in the video games Guitar Hero II and Guitar Hero: Warriors of Rock, respectively. Additionally, the Dethklok song "Laser Cannon Deth Sentence" was added to Warriors of Rock as downloadable content. The song "Murmaider" was included in the soundtrack to the 2009 video game Brütal Legend.

== Comic book ==
The Dethklok vs. The Goon (one-shot) was issued by Dark Horse Comics on July 23, 2009. Written by Brendon Small and Eric Powell. Dethklok is sent into the same universe as The Goon, who seeks to kill them.

The next day, Dark Horse announced a forthcoming short-run Dethklok series in collaboration with Adult Swim, which appeared the next year.

- Dethklok #1, October 6, 2010. Written by Brendon Small, Jon Schnepp and Jeremy Barlow. Dethklok decides to venture into the frozen food market with Dethklok frozen dinners, though after many setbacks, the band releases lethally poisonous food on their fans.
- Dethklok #2, December 15, 2010. Written by Brendon Small, Jon Schnepp and Jeremy Barlow. Dethklok returns to Finland to apologize for their last visit when they awakened a troll, while a cult of troll worshippers plan to use the band to unleash end times through the trolls once again.
- Dethklok #3, February 23, 2011. Written by Brendon Small, Jon Schnepp and Jeremy Barlow. Dethklok builds a cross-country train to help blues legend Mashed Potatoes Johnson get out of his deal with Satan over his soul, while a ghost of a train-riding murderer is about to send things off the rails.

All four comics appeared with variant cover art by Eric Powell and Jon Schnepp. The Dethklok HC deluxe hardcover collected the four comics and was released by Dark Horse on June 15, 2011.
