= Tommy Blacha =

American voice actor and writer

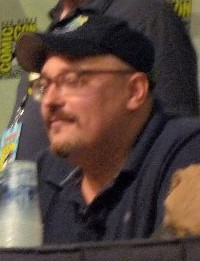
- Blacha at the 2008 San Diego Comic-Con
- Born: Thomas Blacha; August 25, 1962 (age 64); Detroit, Michigan, U.S.
- Occupations: Voice actor; writer; producer
- Writing career
- Pen name: Tom Blacha
- Years active: 1993–present
- Genres: Comedy; Satire; Pro Wrestling
- Notable works: Late Night with Conan O'Brien; TV Funhouse; Da Ali G Show; Metalocalypse; Mongo Wrestling Alliance

Thomas Blacha (born August 25, 1962) is an American voice actor, writer, and producer. He is known working for shows such as Metalocalypse, Da Ali G Show, and Late Night with Conan O'Brien.

== Career ==
Blacha started as a local Chicago Comedy writer, where he met Andy Richter. Richter eventually landed Blacha a job with the Conan O'Brien show in 1993. Tommy worked on the Conan O'Brien show until 1999 writing bit pieces and developing such characters as "Gaseous Wiener" and "PimpBot5000".

After leaving the Conan O'Brien show, Blacha went on to work for WWE in 1999 as a Creative Director along with Brian Gewirtz after Vince Russo and Ed Ferrara departed. At WWE he helped come up with new plotlines and stories for the company. This role put him in bit parts for the fights themselves, where, while playing a medic, he once ended up getting slammed into a table by the wrestler Kane. Tommy also participated in what was voted Monday Night Raw's worst moment, which was the delivery of Mae Young's hand baby.

During this time, Tommy was also doing work with TV Funhouse, the Comedy Central series based on the animated shorts on Saturday Night Live. He was part of the writing team as well as playing the voice part of Hank and Whiskers. Some sources also list Tommy Blacha as a Producer for TV Funhouse. While there he wrote and produced the infamous "Black Sabbath" cartoon and the Oprah skewering "Stedman: Secret Agent" cartoon with Andy Breckman.

Tommy lived in Las Vegas for a short while in 2002 and 2003 where he was promoting mixed martial arts and pro wrestling events. He was also attempting to do this in Japan and Russia.

By 2004 Tommy Blacha moved onto new projects, becoming a writer on Andy Richter Controls the Universe, Da Ali G Show, and head writer for Late World with Zach and The Orlando Jones Show. During this time, he met Brendon Small and began developing the concept for Metalocalypse, which was picked up by Adult Swim in 2005 and was first aired in August 2006. In the show, he voices the characters of Toki Wartooth, William Murderface, Dr. Rockso, and many others. He co-wrote, alongside Brendon Small, every episode of the first and second seasons of the show, and directed the episodes "Dethstars" and "Dethgov". For the third and fourth seasons, he left the production of the show but still returned to voice his characters.

Since mid-2015, Tommy has been a recurring guest/co-host on Ten Minute Podcast. In June 2021, it was announced that Blacha will serve as showrunner for the upcoming Netflix original animated series Super Giant Robot Brothers, which was released in 2022.

== Filmography ==
Year	Title	Role	Other notes
2026	Robot Chicken Adult Swim Special	Toki Wartooth, William Murderface, Dr. Rockso	Voice actor, Television special
2022	Super Giant Robot Brothers		Creator, Writer, Executive Producer
2019	Mao Mao: Heroes of Pure Heart	Ol' Blue, Chubbum, Lucky, Steel Wing, Rhett the Chef, Gary, Radio Voice, TV Character	Voice actor (2 episodes)
2017–2026	American Dad!	Sky Crooner, Groom	Voice actor (12 episodes)
2014–2016	Turbo FAST	Lumino, Dave	Voice actor (2 episodes)
2013–2014; 2023	King Star King	King Star King, Hank Waffles, Gurbles, Mike Balls, Kwa Kwa, Angry Dad, Angry Alien. Max Cat	Writer, Developer, Executive Producer
2013	Drunk History	Himself	Narrator, Retold story of Al Capone
2012–2013	The Eric André Show	—N/a	Consultant writer
2012	Mary Shelley's Frankenhole	—N/a	Consultant producer
2012	Triptank	Lucius / Slave / Gladiators	Voice actor
2011–2015	China, IL	The Mayor	Voice actor
2011	Mongo Wrestling Alliance	Fat Balthazaar Kleberkuh	Creator, Writer, Producer
2010–2011	Pretend Time	—N/a	Writer
2010	Yappy Broads	Himself (Co-host)	Actor; TV movie
2008	Human Giant	—N/a	Writer (1 episode)
2007	Afro Samurai	—N/a	Consultant producer (5 episodes)
2006–2013	Metalocalypse	William Murderface, Toki Wartooth, Dr. Rockso, Dethklok Minute Host, Various	Writer, Director (2006–2008); Creator, Voice actor, Executive producer (2006–present)
2006–2009	Aqua Teen Hunger Force	Dr. Wongburger; Dick Mascot; Gary the Dairy Fairy	Voice actor (2 episodes); Credited as "Tommy Batflatch" and "Dick Blacha"
2005 –2006	Mind of Mencia	—N/a	Co-executive producer (12 episodes)
2003	The Orlando Jones Show	—N/a	Writer
2003	Da Ali G Show	—N/a	Contributing writer (6 episodes)
2002–2003	Andy Richter Controls the Universe	—N/a	Writer; Story editor
2002	Late World with Zach	—N/a	Writer
2000–2001	TV Funhouse	Hank	Writer, Producer, Voice actor
2000	Saturday Night Live	—N/a	Guest writer Episode: "The Rock/AC/DC"
2000	ShortCuts	Wrong-doer	Actor (1 episode)
2000	WWF Backlash	—N/a	Producer
1994–1999	Late Night with Conan O'Brien	Sketch Actor	Writer
