= List of amphibious warfare ships of the Royal Navy =

This is a list of amphibious warfare ships of the Royal Navy of the United Kingdom.

== Landing Platform Helicopter (LPH) ==
- HMS Ocean
- HMS Theseus
- HMS Albion
- HMS Bulwark
- HMS Hermes
- HMS Ocean
- HMS Illustrious

== Landing Platform Dock (LPD) ==
Fearless-class

- HMS Fearless
- HMS Intrepid

Albion-class

- HMS Albion
- HMS Bulwark

== Landing Ship Dock (LSD) ==
Casa Grande class

- HMS Eastway
- HMS Highway
- HMS Northway
- HMS Oceanway

Bay-class

- RFA Largs Bay
- RFA Lyme Bay (A)
- RFA Mounts Bay (A)
- RFA Cardigan Bay (A)

== Landing Ship Logistics (LSL) ==
Round Table-class

- RFA Sir Bedivere
- RFA Sir Galahad
- RFA Sir Geraint
- RFA Sir Lancelot
- RFA Sir Percivale
- RFA Sir Tristram
- RFA Sir Galahad

== Landing Ship Headquarters (Large) ==
- HMS Bulolo
- HMS Largs
- HMS Hilary
- HMS Lothian

Captain-class

- HMS Dacres
- HMS Kingsmill
- HMS Lawford

== Landing ship, tank (LST) ==
- HMS Misoa (F117)
- HMS Tasajera (F125)
- HMS Bachaquero (F110)
- HMS Boxer
- HMS Bruiser
- HMS Thruster
- LST 3001
- LST 3002
- LST 3003 Anzio
- LST 3004
- LST 3005
- LST 3006 Tromsø
- LST 3007
- LST 3008
- LST 3009
- LST 3010 Attacker
- LST 3011 Avenger
- LST 3012 Ben Nevis
- LST 3013 Ben Lomond
- LST 3014
- LST 3015 Battler
- LST 3016 Dieppe
- LST 3017
- LST 3018
- LST 3019 Vaagso
- LST 3020
- LST 3021
- LST 3022
- LST 3023
- LST 3024
- LST 3025 Bruiser
- LST 3026 Charger
- LST 3027 Lofoten
- LST 3028
- LST 3029 Chaser
- LST 3031
- LST 3033
- LST 3035
- LST 3036 Puncher
- LST 3037
- LST 3038 Fighter
- LST 3042 Hunter
- LST 3041
- LST 3043 Messina
- LST 3044 Narvik
- LST 3501
- LST 3502
- LST 3503
- LST 3504 Pursuer
- LST 3505 Ravager
- LST 3506
- LST 3507
- LST 3508 Searcher
- LST 3509
- LST 3510 Slinger
- LST 3511 Reggio
- LST 3512
- LST 3513 Salerno
- LST 3514 Smiter
- LST 3515 Stalker
- LST 3516 Striker
- LST 3517 St Nazaire
- LST 3518 Suvla
- LST 3519
- LST 3520 Thruster
- LST 3522 Tracker
- LST 3523 Trouncer
- LST 3524 Trumpeter
- LST 3525 Walcheren
- LST 3532 Zeebrugge
- LST 3534
