= Extinction Level Event (Dark Angel album) =

Studio album by Dark Angel
- Released: September 5, 2025
- Recorded: July 2024–February 2025
- Studios: Armoury Studios, Vancouver, British Columbia
- Genre: Thrash metal
- Length: 49:22
- Label: Reversed
- Producer: Rob Shallcross

Dark Angel chronology
Decade of Chaos (1992)	Extinction Level Event (2025)

Dark Angel studio albums chronology
Time Does Not Heal (1991)	Extinction Level Event (2025)

Singles from Extinction Level Event
- 1. "Extinction Level Event" Released: April 11, 2025; 2. "Circular Firing Squad" Released: June 6, 2025

Extinction Level Event is the fifth studio album by the American thrash metal band Dark Angel, released on September 5, 2025 on Reversed Records. It is the band's first studio album since 1991's Time Does Not Heal.

Extinction Level Event is also Dark Angel's first release with rhythm guitarist Laura Christine (who is drummer Gene Hoglan's wife), following the death of Jim Durkin in 2023, to whom the album is dedicated. Durkin receives posthumous songwriting credits for some of the album's songs, including the title track, as they were written prior to his death. The album's origins date back to 1992, when the band began working on new material before their breakup that year.

== Background and production ==
The album's origins date to 1992, when Dark Angel began writing and recording demos for their fifth studio album under the title Atrocity Exhibition. However, the album was left unfinished and abandoned when the band broke up in September of that year. By the late 1990s, Dark Angel had received numerous offers to reunite, the most lucrative coming from a headlining European tour in 1999 with Ancient Rites that was scrapped for logistical reasons. The band officially reformed in 2002 for a series of shows, one of which saw Dark Angel open for Kreator and Destruction; the lineup for this reunion featured guitarists Eric Meyer and Jim Durkin, drummer Gene Hoglan, vocalist Ron Rinehart and bassist Danyael Williams. Plans were made to embark on the "Darkness Returns" tour during the summer of 2003, with a possible new album to follow, the former of which was cancelled due to Rinehart suffering a severe spinal injury in an accident. This resulted in the band's second disbandment.

Dark Angel announced their second reunion in October 2013, this time featuring the Leave Scars lineup. In November of the following year, Hoglan revealed that he and Durkin were working on "super awesome and super aggressive" material for a new album. In a February 2017 interview with KNAC.com, Hoglan confirmed that he had "five or six songs ready to go" and described the new material as "the youthful energy and aggression of Darkness Descends with a little bit of what we were doing with Time Does Not Heal and some cool-ass Leave Scars thrown in."

Progress on new material from Dark Angel remained slow for over half a decade, due Hoglan's schedules with Testament, Death to All and other projects, as well as the band members living far apart from one another and wanting to take their time with perfecting the material. In a February 2019 interview with Agoraphobic News, Hoglan stated that Dark Angel had "5 or 6 songs on the go" and that their fifth album would be released "by the end of this year or by 2020." More delays were encountered until January 2022, when Hoglan (who had recently left Testament) revealed that the band was "moving forward" with writing a new album and they were intending "to be in the studio before the end of this year." Hoglan later stated the album would likely be released in 2023.

Durkin, who had been inactive since 2020 due to personal matters, died on March 8, 2023 at the age of 58. The surviving members of Dark Angel decided that the band was going to continue in Durkin's memory, with Hoglan's wife Laura Christine replacing him, and announced that their upcoming fifth album would be released in 2023 or 2024 and also serve as a tribute to Durkin.

On July 25, 2024, Hoglan confirmed in a video message posted on social media that Dark Angel had begun recording their fifth studio album and he had "just finished the drums to" it. They released a video teaser for the album via social media on March 19, 2025, confirming that it would be released later in the year on Reversed Records. Two days later, the band debuted two new songs, "Circular Firing Squad" and the album's title track "Extinction Level Event", during a performance in Buenos Aires. They performed the same tracks two days later in Santiago, Chile. The band revealed the artwork for Extinction Level Event in April 2025. The album's title track was released as a single that same month, followed in June by its second single "Circular Firing Squad". The release date and track listing of the album were revealed on August 18, 2025.

== Release ==
The album marks the first time since 1985's We Have Arrived that the band did not release an album with Relativity Records or its subsidiary label Combat.

Extinction Level Event was released digitally on September 5, 2025, with physical copies of the album delayed for roughly two months. It is currently one of two Dark Angel studio albums (along with We Have Arrived) not available on streaming services.

== Track listing ==
All the tracks written by Gene Hoglan, except Extinction Level Event by Durkin and Extraction Tactics by Durkin and Meyer.

No.	Title	Lyrics	Music	Length
1.	"Extinction Level Event"	Hoglan	Durkin	4:16
2.	"Circular Firing Squad"	Hoglan, Rinehart	Hoglan	4:30
3.	"Woke Up to Blood"	Hoglan, Rinehart	Hoglan, Christine	5:00
4.	"Apex Predator"	Hoglan	Hoglan, Christine	5:06
5.	"Sea of Heads"	Hoglan, Rinehart	Hoglan, Christine	3:49
6.	"Atavistic"	Hoglan	Hoglan	3:44
7.	"Scaler Weaponry"	Hoglan	Hoglan, Christine	4:29
8.	"Scarface the Room"	Hoglan	Hoglan	4:36
9.	"E Pluribus Nemo"	Hoglan	Hoglan, Christine	4:59
10.	"Terror Construct"	Hoglan	Hoglan	5:17
11.	"Extraction Tactics"	Hoglan	Durkin, Meyer	3:36
Total length:				49:22

== Personnel ==
Dark Angel

- Ron Rinehart – vocals
- Eric Meyer – guitar
- Laura Christine – guitar
- Mike Gonzalez – bass
- Gene Hoglan – drums, rhythm guitar

Additional personnel

- Gene Hoglan – executive production
- Rob Shallcross – production, engineering
- Mike Fraser – mixing
- Cain Gillis – album cover
- Jim Durkin – posthumous songwriting (track 1,11)
