= Viking (disambiguation) =

The Vikings were seafaring Scandinavians.

Viking or Vikings may also refer to:

== Arts, entertainment, and media ==
=== Comics ===
- Viking (comics)
- Vikings #1 (2013), comic book prequel to the Vikings TV series
- Thor: Vikings, a comic book series

=== Films ===
- The Viking, a 1914 Victory Photoplay Company film starring Betty Harte
- The Viking (1928 film), a color film about Viking settlers
- The Viking (1931 film), a black-and-white film about seal hunting
- The Vikings (film), a 1958 adventure film starring Kirk Douglas
- Viking (2016 film), a 2016 Russian historical film
- Viking (2022 film), a 2022 Canadian science fiction comedy

=== Music ===
==== Groups ====
- Viking (band), an American thrash metal band
- Los Vikings, a 1960 Salvadoran rock band
- The Vikings (1950s quartet), a barbershop quartet
- The Vikings (British band)
- The Vikings (South African band), a 1959–1961 rock and roll band

==== Albums ====
- Viking (album), by Lars Frederiksen and the Bastards
- Vikings (album), by New Politics
- Vikinger, by Danheim

==== Other uses in music ====
- The Vikings, a 1990s side project of Norwegian band Turbonegro
- Hagström Viking, a guitar
- Viking Records, a New Zealand independent record label

=== Radio ===
- Viking FM, former name for a British independent radio station, now known as Hits Radio East Yorkshire & North Lincolnshire
- The Vikings (radio program), a radio program broadcast by NBC

=== Television ===
- Viking: The Ultimate Obstacle Course, a Japanese game show
- Vikings (2012 TV series), a BBC documentary series
- Vikings (TV series), a 2013 historical drama series
  - Vikings: Valhalla, a 2022 sequel to the original drama series

=== Literature ===
- The Vikings, a 1913 history book by Allen Mawer
- The Viking, a 1951 novel by Edison Marshall
- "The Vikings", an illustrated short story in the 1984 anthology book Garfield: His 9 Lives
- Viking, a 1994 novel by Fabio Lanzoni, written with Eugenia Riley

=== Other arts, entertainment, and media ===
- Viking (game), a 1975 board wargame
- Viking (comedy duo)
- Viking: Battle for Asgard, a 2008 game for Xbox 360 and PS3
- Viking Press, an American publishing company
- Vikings (RuneQuest), a 1985 role playing game supplement

== Businesses ==
=== Manufacturers ===
==== Vehicle manufacturers ====
- Viking Air, a Canadian aircraft manufacturer
- Viking Cycle Company, a British bicycle manufacturer
- Viking Flying Boat Company, owned by Robert E. Gross

==== Other manufacturers ====
- Viking Range, a kitchen appliance manufacturer
- Viking Enterprise Solutions, formerly Viking Technology, Viking Interworks and Viking Modular Solutions, a division of the electronics manufacturing services provider Sanmina Corporation
- VSM Group (Viking Sewing Machines), a sewing machine manufacturer

=== Transport lines ===
==== Air ====
- Viking Airlines, a defunct private charter airline which was based in Stockholm, Sweden
- Scanair (airline call sign Viking), a defunct charter airline based in Stockholm, Sweden
- Sunclass Airlines (airline call sign Viking), formerly Thomas Cook Airlines Scandinavia, based in Denmark

==== Maritime ====
- Viking Line, a Finnish shipping line
- Viking (cruise line), based in Basel, Switzerland

=== Other businesses ===
- Hotel Royal Christiania, formerly the Hotel Viking, in Oslo, Norway

== Organizations ==
- Independent Order of Vikings, an American fraternal organization
- Task Force Viking, a US Army formation in the Iraq War
- The Vikings (reenactment group), a UK-based historical reenactment society

== People ==
- Viking (given name)
- Viking (nickname)

== Places ==
- Viking, Alberta, Canada, a town
- Viking, Minnesota, US, a city
- Viking, Wisconsin, US, an unincorporated community
- Viking Formation, a geological feature in Canada
- Viking Valley, Alexander Island, Antarctica
- Viking, a region of the North Sea used in the British Shipping Forecast

== Sport ==
=== College and university sports ===
Several North American schools use the name "Vikings" for their sports teams, including:

- Augustana College (Illinois)
- Augustana College (South Dakota)
- Augustana University College, Alberta, Canada
- Bethany Lutheran College, Minnesota
- Cleveland State University, Ohio
- Lawrence University, Wisconsin
- Portland State University, Oregon
- Salem State University, Massachusetts
- University of Victoria, British Columbia, Canada (now named the Victoria Vikes)
- Waterloo Collegiate Institute, Ontario, Canada
- Western Washington University

=== American football ===
- Minnesota Vikings, an American football team
- Oslo Vikings, a Norwegian American football team
- University of Limerick Vikings, an Irish American football team

=== Association football (soccer) ===
- FC Vestsjælland, also known as FCV Vikings, a Danish football club
- FC Viikingit (FC Vikings), a Finnish football club
- Knattspyrnufélagið Víkingur, an Icelandic football club
- Viking FK, a Norwegian football club
- Viking Stadion, a football stadium in Stavanger, Norway
- Víkingur Gøta (Vikings Gøta), a football club in the Faroe Islands

=== Ice hockey ===
- Dunfermline Vikings, a defunct Scottish ice hockey team
- Elliot Lake Vikings, a Canadian Junior A ice hockey team
- Jamestown Vikings, a defunct American ice hockey team
- Nybro Vikings, a Swedish ice hockey team
- Southampton Vikings, a defunct English ice hockey team
- Tønsberg Vikings, a Norwegian ice hockey club
- HC Viking Tallinn, an Estonian ice hockey club
- Viking Award, given to the best Swedish ice hockey player in North America
- Viking Cup, a world ice hockey tournament in Camrose, Alberta, Canada
- Viking IK, a defunct ice hockey team in Stavanger, Norway
  - Viking Hockey, Viking IK's successor

=== Rugby ===
- Bay Roskill Vikings, a New Zealand rugby league football club
- Canberra Vikings, an Australian rugby union football club
- Somerset Vikings, an English rugby league team
- Tuggeranong Vikings, an Australian rugby union club
- Widnes Vikings, an English rugby league club

=== Other sports ===
- Denmark Vikings, a Danish Australian rules football team
- Harstad Vikings, a defunct Norwegian basketball team
- Hull Vikings, a speedway motorcycle team in Hull, England
- Solna Vikings, a Swedish basketball team
- TIF Viking, a Norwegian sports club
  - Viking Park, home stadium of the Tuggeranong Vikings
- Victorian Vikings, an Australian field hockey team
- Viking Håndball, a Norwegian handball club

== Vehicles ==
=== Aircraft ===
- ASL Viking, a two-seater British biplane first flown in 1912
- Bellanca Viking, a four-seat American plane introduced in 1967
- Grob Viking, a sailplane used by the Royal Air Force among other operators, introduced in the 1980s
- Lockheed S-3 Viking, a U.S. Navy aircraft introduced in 1974
- St Andrews Viking, an American powered parachute design
- Vance Viking, an American single-seat cargo and racing aircraft first flown in 1932
- Vickers VC.1 Viking, a British airliner introduced in 1946
- Vickers Viking, a British military aircraft introduced in 1919

=== Land vehicles ===
- Albion Viking, bus manufactured in Scotland
- Leyland Super Viking, bus manufactured in England
- Viking (automobile), manufactured by Oldsmobile from 1929 to 1931
- BvS 10, an all-terrain armoured vehicle called Viking by the British Armed Forces

=== Rockets and spacecraft ===
- Viking (rocket), a series of sounding rockets
- Viking (rocket engine)
- Viking (satellite)
- Viking program, two NASA missions to Mars
  - Viking 1
  - Viking 2

=== Ships ===
==== Commercial and private ====
- Viking (barque), a Danish sailing ship, now used as a hotel
- Viking (replica Viking longship), a Norwegian replica of a Viking ship
- Empire Viking, several Empire Ships named Viking; see List of Empire ships (U–Z)
- HSC Viking, a fastcraft in the Isle of Man Steam Packet fleet
- MS Viking, several motorships
- SS Viking, a steam-powered sealing ship used to film The Viking (1931 film)
- SS Viking (1905), also named HMS Vindex
- Viking Line, a Finnish ferry and cruise operator, and its ships:
  - MS Viking XPRS, a Viking Line fast cruise ferry
  - MS Viking ADCC, a planned but canceled Viking Line ferry

==== Naval ====
- HMS Viking, several British Royal Navy ships
- HNoMS Viking (1891), a Royal Norwegian Navy gunboat
- USS Viking, various US Navy ships
- Viking-class submarine, a planned but canceled European submarine class

== Other uses ==
- MP-446 Viking, a Russian semi-automatic pistol
- Viking Link, a planned submarine power cable between the UK and Denmark
- Viking Wind Farm, a proposed Shetland Islands wind farm

== See also ==
- Viking Aircraft (disambiguation)
- Wiking (disambiguation)
