= Viking One =

Viking One, Viking 1, Viking I, or variant, may refer to:

- Viking 1 (1975-1982) NASA space probe to Mars
- Viking I (rocket), a 1949 U.S. NRL sounding rocket mission
- Société Européenne de Propulsion Viking 1 (rocket engine), the first version of the Viking (rocket engine)
- MS Viking 1 (1970-2002) roll-on--roll-off car and passenger ferry, called "Viking 1" (1970-1982)
- MS Viking I (1964-2008) roll-on--roll-off passenger and car ferry
- Empire Viking I, the Empire Ship named "Viking I", see List of Empire ships (U–Z)
- Viking Aircraft Viking I, a powered parachute maded by Viking Aircraft, introduced in 2000
- Vickers VC.1 Viking 1, a variant of the WW2 airliner Vickers VC.1 Viking
- Vickers Viking I, the name of the first production aircraft of the WW1 amphibious plane Vickers Viking
- Vikings (season 1), 2013 TV season of Vikings TV series
- Vikings episode 1 "Rites of Passage", see List of Vikings episodes

== See also ==
- Viking (disambiguation)
