= Leave Scars =

Studio album by Dark Angel
- Released: January 24, 1989
- Recorded: May–July 1988
- Studios: Space Station Studios, Hollywood, California
- Genres: Thrash metal; progressive metal
- Length: 50:06
- Label: Combat
- Producers: Michael Monarch, Dark Angel

Dark Angel chronology
Darkness Descends (1986)	Leave Scars (1989)	Live Scars (1990)

Leave Scars is the third studio album released by the American thrash metal band, Dark Angel, released on January 24, 1989. It was their first album with vocalist Ron Rinehart and bassist Mike Gonzalez (who joined just prior to the release of Darkness Descends), and the last to feature guitarist Jim Durkin, although he would receive posthumous songwriting credits for their 2025 comeback album Extinction Level Event. Leave Scars was Dark Angel's most successful release, peaking at number 159 on the Billboard 200.

== Musical style ==
Leave Scars saw Dark Angel expand the thrash metal sound of their previous two albums, We Have Arrived and Darkness Descends. It introduced a more technical and progressive element to the band's music than the raw sound of its predecessors, presenting two instrumentals and several songs lasting more than five minutes. This album can also be seen as the genesis of the direction Dark Angel would take on their 1991 follow-up album Time Does Not Heal, which saw them expanding their technical sound even further.

== Reception ==
Professional ratings
Review scores
Source	Rating
Allmusic	2.5/5 stars
Kerrang!	3/5 stars

Leave Scars received a positive-to-mixed review from AllMusic's Eduardo Rivadavia, who gave the album a rating of two-and-a-half out of five. He noted that, with Leave Scars, Dark Angel "continued to perfect their already quite impressive musical chops, while simultaneously refining their brutal thrashing" and called it "the album which inaugurates their progressive thrash phase, as increasingly complex structures and frequent, unexpected time changes result in numbers of epic proportions." In the closing in his review, however, Rivadavia wrote, "Ultimately, Leave Scars only fails to score higher marks because Dark Angel forgot to add a final, crucial ingredient to its potent recipe: melody. And sure enough, addressing this small oversight would result in their magnum opus, 1991's colossal Time Does Not Heal."

== Track listing ==
All songs written by Gene Hoglan and Jim Durkin, except where noted.

No.	Title	Writer(s)	Length
1.	"The Death of Innocence"		3:49
2.	"Never to Rise Again"	Hoglan, Durkin, Ron Rinehart	3:55
3.	"No One Answers"		7:50
4.	"Cauterization" (Instrumental)		7:20
5.	"Immigrant Song" (Led Zeppelin cover)	Jimmy Page, Robert Plant	1:47
6.	"Older Than Time Itself"		6:59
7.	"Worms" (Instrumental)		2:18
8.	"The Promise of Agony"		8:25
9.	"Leave Scars"		7:40
Total length:			50:06

== Credits ==
Dark Angel

- Ron Rinehart - lead vocals
- Eric Meyer - guitar, backing vocals
- Jim Durkin - guitar, backing vocals, violin bow, assorted instruments
- Mike Gonzalez - bass, backing vocals
- Gene Hoglan - drums, backing vocals, rhythm guitar, assorted instruments

Additional musician

- Ron Eriksen - guest vocals on "The Promise of Agony"
