= Darkness Descends =

Studio album by Dark Angel
- Released: November 17, 1986
- Recorded: April 1986
- Studios: Music Grinder Studios, Hollywood; Mad Dog Studios, Venice
- Genre: Thrash metal
- Length: 35:03
- Label: Combat
- Producers: Randy Burns, Dark Angel

Dark Angel chronology
We Have Arrived (1985)	Darkness Descends (1986)	Leave Scars (1989)

Darkness Descends is the second studio album by the American thrash metal band Dark Angel, released on November 17, 1986. Released at the height of thrash metal's popularity, Darkness Descends received generally positive reviews from music critics, and has been cited as a major influence on the death metal, doom metal and groove metal scenes of the late 1980s and 1990s. It is considered an essential release in the thrash metal genre.

Though bassist Rob Yahn appears on the album, Mike Gonzalez received credit in the liner notes. Darkness Descends was Dark Angel's final album to feature original vocalist Don Doty, and also the first to feature drummer Gene Hoglan, who joined the band a few months prior the release of their debut album We Have Arrived.

== Background and recording ==
According to drummer Gene Hoglan, recording for Darkness Descends began on April 14, 1986. It was produced by Randy Burns, who had just recently completed work on Megadeth's second album Peace Sells... but Who's Buying?, and production of the album lasted two weeks. Hoglan claims to recall an incident during the album's recording process where he was kicked out of the studio by Burns because he was screaming at Doty for "not being fucking heavy enough." Hoglan also stated that he recorded all of his drum takes within one day, with the exception of "Black Prophecies", which the band had written one day prior to entering the studio. Hoglan said the track was "nailed" in one take.

== Music and lyrics ==
The song "Darkness Descends" is about the comic book characters known as the Dark Judges from the Judge Dredd comic book series, and even contains their famous statement, "this city is guilty, the crime is life, the sentence is death." "Death Is Certain (Life Is Not)" deals with euthanasia. "Black Prophecies" addresses Nostradamus's prophetic gift and the foretelling of Hitler. "Perish in Flames" describes a pilot's thoughts as he destroys a ground target with terrible weapons. "The Burning of Sodom" tells the story of Lot's flight from the destruction of Sodom and Gomorrah. "Merciless Death" is a re-recording of a song from Dark Angel's previous album We Have Arrived.

Dark Angel drummer Gene Hoglan described the writing process, "Well, to be honest, the 'mixed bag' of other writers on Darkness Descends was more like a riff here and there. Eric Meyer wrote a riff on 'The Burning of Sodom', so we gave him credit. Eric also got credit for writing something in 'Death Is Certain (Life Is Not)'. But I can guarantee you that that was me, Jim and [bassist] Rob Yahn who wrote that song and Eric just had an idea for how to start off the song. But back then I didn't really know much about songwriting credits and all that."

While Darkness Descends continued the traditional thrash metal sound of We Have Arrived, a portion of the album (particularly "Black Prophecies") contains elements that would be expanded upon on Dark Angel's next two albums, Leave Scars and Time Does Not Heal, which saw the band produce a mixture of thrash metal with progressive and technical structures. Hoglan would later claim, "In Dark Angel's evolution, we've never had two albums sound the same. Darkness Descends did not sound like We Have Arrived, and Leave Scars did not sound like Darkness Descends, and so on."

== Reception and legacy ==
Professional ratings
Review scores
Source	Rating
AllMusic	3/5 stars
Collector's Guide to Heavy Metal	6/10

In August 2014, Revolver placed Darkness Descends on its "14 Thrash Albums You Need to Own" list. Decibel Magazine placed it 9th on its "50 Greatest Thrash Metal Albums of All Time." Loudwire placed Darkness Descends at number 6 on its "Top Ten Thrash Albums NOT Released by the Big 4" list. It is considered to be a classic in the thrash metal genre.

Gene Hoglan's drumming on the album has been criticized for perceived "slopp[iness]," particularly in comparison to the drummer's output later in his career. Invisible Oranges stated that Hoglan was "getting by more on intensity than on technique" at this stage in his career. Hoglan himself retrospectively said of his performance on the album: "I was an 18-year-old kid with a whole lot of energy who thought he knew what he was doing, but totally didn't. On that record, I was woefully un-tight. And we certainly did not have a great guitar sound [...] We actually slowed down drastically when we recorded [the album]. We were much faster before that — because I believed that you needed to really feel it to be at your best, and unless you were playing as fast as you [could], you probably weren't really feeling it. I just didn't have the proper philosophies back then. So Darkness Descends is just a challenging album to listen to, from my standpoint. I appreciate that people enjoy it and I'm grateful that it has kept up its reputation over the years, but it's not an easy album for me to listen to."

== Track listing ==
Side one
No.	Title	Lyrics	Music	Length
1.	"Darkness Descends"	Gene Hoglan	Jim Durkin; Hoglan	5:49
2.	"The Burning of Sodom"	Durkin; Hoglan; Don Doty	Durkin; Eric Meyer	3:16
3.	"Hunger of the Undead"	Hoglan	Durkin; Hoglan; Meyer	4:16
4.	"Merciless Death"	Durkin; Doty	Durkin	4:04

Side two
No.	Title	Lyrics	Music	Length
5.	"Death Is Certain (Life Is Not)"	Hoglan	Durkin; Hoglan; Meyer; Rob Yahn	4:15
6.	"Black Prophecies"	Hoglan	Durkin; Hoglan	8:29
7.	"Perish in Flames"	Doty	Durkin	4:49

1998 Century Media re-release bonus tracks
No.	Title	Lyrics	Music	Length
8.	"Merciless Death" (live)	Durkin; Doty	Durkin	3:44
9.	"Perish in Flames / Darkness Descends" (live)	Doty / Hoglan	Durkin /: Durkin; Hoglan	8:27

=== Icarus Records 2010 remastered bonus tracks ===
Darkness Descends on Philadelphia - DFA Live at the Trocadero, October 23, 1988

No.	Title	Length
8.	"The Burning of Sodom"	5:30
9.	"Death Is Certain (Life Is Not)"	3:43
10.	"Merciless Death"	3:45
11.	"Perish in Flames"	5:07
12.	"Darkness Descends"	6:41

Darkness Descends on Reseda - DFA Live at the Country Club April 22, 1989

No.	Title	Length
13.	"We Have Arrived"
14.	"The Burning of Sodom"
15.	"Death Is Certain (Life Is Not)"

== Personnel ==
Dark Angel

- Don Doty – vocals
- Eric Meyer – guitar
- Jim Durkin – guitar
- Rob Yahn – bass
- Gene Hoglan – drums

Additional musicians

- Ron Rinehart – vocals on the live recordings
- Mike Gonzalez – bass on the live recordings

Production

- Randy Burns – production, engineering
- Casey McMackin – engineering
- Eric Meyer – engineering
- Rob Yahn – bass recording engineering
