= Baltic Ferry =

A number of ships were named Baltic Ferry, including:

- MV Baltic Ferry (1945), a former Landing Ship, Tank
- MS Baltic Ferry, a ferry that was requisitioned during the Falklands Campaign
