= Ron Rinehart =

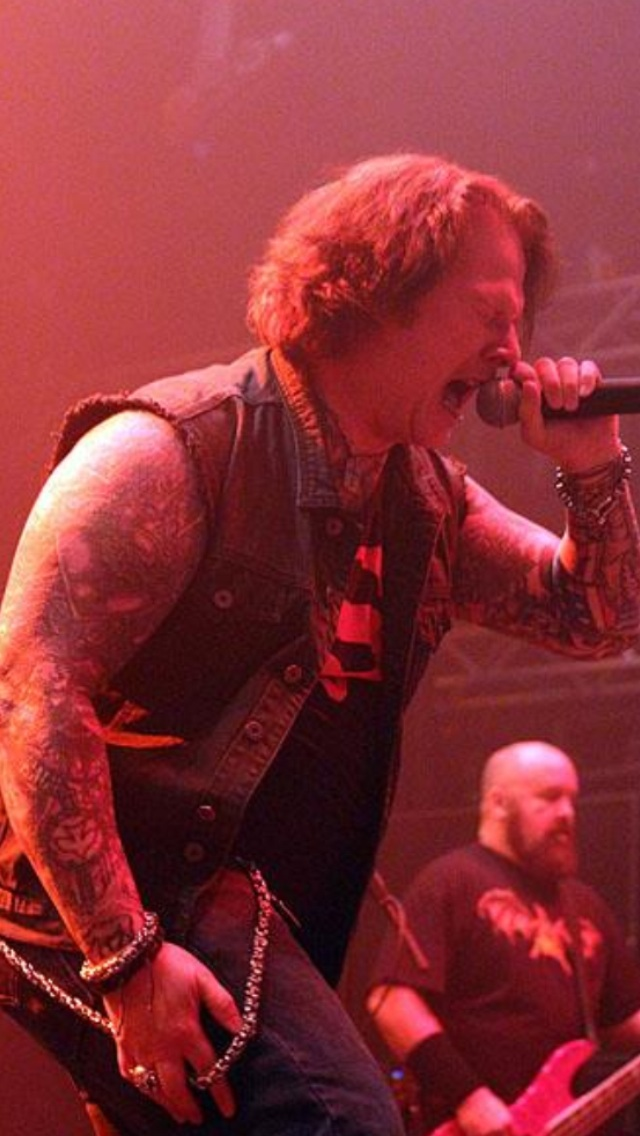
- Rinehart performing live with Dark Angel in 2014

Background information
- Birth name: Ron Rinehart
- Born: January 25, 1965 (age 60)
- Origin: Norwalk, California, U.S.
- Genres: Thrash metal
- Occupation: Musician
- Instrument: Vocals
- Years active: 1987–present
- Website: darkangeltrash.com

Ron Rinehart (born January 25, 1965) is an American thrash metal vocalist. He is the lead singer for the American thrash metal band Dark Angel from 1987 (after the departure of previous vocalist Don Doty) until the band's dissolution in 1992, and again from 2002 to 2005, when they were reunited. In October 2013, Dark Angel announced another reunion, again featuring Rinehart.

Rinehart has appeared on three studio albums with Dark Angel – Leave Scars (1989), Time Does Not Heal (1991) and Extinction Level Event (2025) – and also performed on their live album Live Scars (1990). He also had a guest vocalist appearance on thrash metal band Viking's album Man of Straw.

After Dark Angel's dissolution, Rinehart and bandmate Eric Meyer went on to form a band called Hunger. They released a three track demo the following year. He has also played in the Christian rock band Oil, but left in 2004 to pursue other musical interests.
