= Live Scars =

Live album by Dark Angel
- Released: May 8, 1990
- Recorded: April 22, 1989 at the Country Club in Reseda, California.
- Genre: Thrash metal
- Length: 29:58 (LP); 42:48 (CD)
- Label: Combat

Dark Angel chronology
Leave Scars (1989)	Live Scars (1990)	Time Does Not Heal (1991)

Professional ratings
Review scores
Source	Rating
Allmusic	3/5 stars

Live Scars is a live album by thrash metal band Dark Angel, which was released in 1990. It was recorded at the Country Club live in Reseda, California on April 22, 1989.

== Track listing ==
=== LP track listing ===
No.	Title	Length
1.	"Leave Scars"	9:31
2.	"The Burning of Sodom"	3:32
3.	"Never to Rise Again"	4:09
4.	"The Promise of Agony"	8:50
5.	"We Have Arrived"	3:56
Total length:		29:58

=== CD track listing ===
No.	Title	Length
1.	"Leave Scars"	9:31
2.	"The Burning of Sodom"	3:32
3.	"Never to Rise Again"	4:09
4.	"Death Is Certain (Life Is Not)"	3:53
5.	"The Promise of Agony"	8:50
6.	"We Have Arrived"	3:56
7.	"The Death of Innocence"	5:36
8.	"I Don't Care About You" (Fear Cover)	3:21
Total length:		42:48

== Credits ==
- Ron Rinehart - vocals
- Eric Meyer - guitar
- Brett Eriksen - guitar
- Mike Gonzalez - bass
- Gene Hoglan - drums
