= Time Does Not Heal =

Studio album by Dark Angel
- Released: February 19, 1991
- Recorded: September−October 1990
- Studios: Front Page Recorders, Costa Mesa, California
- Genres: Technical thrash metal; progressive metal
- Length: 67:07
- Label: Combat
- Producer: Terry Date

Dark Angel chronology
Live Scars (1990)	Time Does Not Heal (1991)	Decade of Chaos (1992)

Dark Angel studio albums chronology
Leave Scars (1989)	Time Does Not Heal (1991)	Extinction Level Event (2025)

Time Does Not Heal is the fourth studio album by Dark Angel, released in 1991. It is the band's only album with former Viking guitarist Brett Eriksen, who had replaced Jim Durkin two years earlier. Although they had worked on another album just prior to their breakup in 1992, under the name Atrocity Exhibition, Time Does Not Heal was Dark Angel's last studio album for 34 years until their 2025 comeback Extinction Level Event.

Eduardo Rivadavia of Loudwire said the album was "arguably the last essential album released during thrash metal's golden era."

== Music ==
Time Does Not Heal saw Dark Angel continuing the experimentation of its predecessor, Leave Scars (1989), introducing elements of technical and progressive, otherwise known as "technical thrash metal". It includes songs that are more than five minutes in length, odd time signatures and more complexity; similar to its predecessor, Time Does Not Heal abandoned the occult-related themes of their first two albums in favor of lyrics about social issues such as politics, psychology and apathy. Eduardo Rivadavia of Loudwire said the album "represents the apex of thinking man's thrash, while sacrificing not an ounce of ferocity while getting its point across."

== Release and artwork ==
When the album was released, it came with a sticker, reading "9 songs, 67 minutes, 246 riffs!", a claim later verified by drummer Gene Hoglan.

== Reception ==
Professional ratings
Review scores
Source	Rating
Allmusic	4/5 stars

Time Does Not Heal received a positive review from AllMusic's Eduardo Rivadavia, who gave the album a rating of four out of five, and called it "a veritable masterpiece of thinking-man's thrash metal." He continued: "With this true colossus of a record, the thrash stalwarts provided what many consider to be the definitive statement in progressive thrash metal. Just imagine what ...And Justice for All would have sounded like if Metallica had recorded it with the attitude of Kill 'Em All, and you'll get the picture. Led by drummer, lyricist, sometime guitarist, and principal songwriter Gene Hoglan, the L.A. quintet packed more riffs (246 total, according to enthusiastic press releases of the time) into this ambitious, long-running disc, than most of their Bay Area neighbors had managed in their entire careers." Rivadavia also described Time Does Not Heal as "amazingly brutal thrash metal album", and concluded that "its sound brought into crisp focus by Pantera and Soundgarden producer Terry Date in ways never achieved on the band's ill-recorded earlier efforts."

== Track listing ==
No.	Title	Writer(s)	Length
1.	"Time Does Not Heal"	Gene Hoglan, Brett Eriksen, Ron Rinehart	6:40
2.	"Pain's Invention, Madness"	Hoglan, Eriksen	7:44
3.	"Act of Contrition"	Hoglan, Eriksen	6:10
4.	"The New Priesthood"	Hoglan, Eriksen	7:15
5.	"Psychosexuality"	Hoglan, Eriksen	8:56
6.	"An Ancient Inherited Shame"	Hoglan, Rinehart	9:16
7.	"Trauma and Catharsis"	Hoglan, Rinehart	8:22
8.	"Sensory Deprivation"	Hoglan, Eriksen	7:36
9.	"A Subtle Induction"	Hoglan, Eriksen, Rinehart	5:06
Total length:			67:07

== Credits ==
- Ron Rinehart - vocals
- Eric Meyer - guitar
- Brett Eriksen - guitar
- Mike Gonzalez - bass
- Gene Hoglan - drums, rhythm guitar
