= MS Viking =

MS Viking may refer to the following motorships:

- MS Viking I, ferry launched in 1964, called Viking I (2007–2008)
- MS Viking 1, ferry launched in 1970, called Viking 1 (1970–1982)
- MS Viking 2 (1986), ferry launched in 1976, called Viking 2 (1986–1988)
- M/S Viking 3
- M/S Viking 4 (IMO number: 7310258)
- MS Viking 5, ferry launched in 1974, called Viking 5 (1974–1980) and The Viking (1981–1983)
- MS Viking 6, ferry launched in 1968, called Viking 6 (1974–1980)
- MS Viking ADCC (All seasons Day Cruising and Commuting), cancelled ship of the 2000s
- MS Viking XPRS (express), ferry launched in 2007
- MS Viking Grace, ferry launched in 2013
- MS Viking Glory, ferry launched in 2021

== See also ==
- Empire Viking, several Empire ships, see List of Empire ships (U–Z)
- Viking (disambiguation)#Ships
