= Sentado à beira do caminho =

Single by Erasmo Carlos
- B-side: "Johnny Furacão"
- Released: 1969
- Genre: Pop
- Label: RGE
- Songwriters: Roberto Carlos; Erasmo Carlos

"Sentado à beira do caminho" ("Sitting by the Side of the Road") is a Brazilian song composed by Roberto Carlos and Erasmo Carlos and released as a single in May 1969 by Erasmo Carlos.

== Background ==
The song was created in 1969. After working on the lyrics for two months, the duo still hadn't come up with the chorus. Just before the deadline, they were working on it in Roberto's house in Morumbi, São Paulo, and he decided to take a nap. When Erasmo woke him up, Roberto mumbled: "Preciso acabar logo com isso. Preciso lembrar que existo" ("I need to get this done soon, I need to remember I exist"), which eventually became the chorus.

The song was inspired by a 1968 hit song, Bobby Goldsboro's "Honey (I miss you)", and it describes the despair and hopelessness of a lover waiting for his beloved, but the two are completely different songs. The hits "L'appuntamento" ("The Date"), "Sentado à beira do caminho" and "Nuestro encuentro" ("Our Encounter") have the same music and similar lyrics in Italian, Portuguese and Spanish language. There is an important difference when translated from Portuguese to the Italian language, the idea of "mixing tears with raindrops" was replaced with "wait for your love no matter the bad weather", which was an important loss of the initial message and a poetry theme switch). A Spanish-language version of the song was also released titled "Sentado a la vera del camino" and was recorded by Erasmo Carlos. The Spanish version has been covered by Los Vikings and Carlos Javier Beltrán. In 1988, American singer Eydie Gormé recorded the Spanish-language version ("Sentado a la vera del camino") with Roberto Carlos for her album De corazón a corazón. The song peaked at number two on the Billboard Hot Latin Songs. Their version led to the duo receiving a nomination for Pop Group or Duo of the Year at the inaugural Lo Nuestro Awards in 1989.

In 1970 the song was adapted into the Italian language by Bruno Lauzi and recorded by Ornella Vanoni with the title "L'appuntamento". This version, chosen as the closing song of the radio show Gran Varietà, became an immediate hit, ranking #2 on the Italian hit parade. The song was also covered by several artists, including Mina, Andrea Bocelli, Fernanda Porto and (in a Greek version) Dimitra Galani (Συνάντηση, "Encounter"). Vanoni's version was included in the musical score of the film Ocean's Twelve.

== Track listing ==
=== Original version ===
7" single – RGE 70.363

1. "Sentado à Beira do Caminho" (Roberto Carlos, Erasmo Carlos)
2. "Johnny Furacão" (Roberto Carlos, Erasmo Carlos)

=== L'appuntamento ===
7" single – CBS 3654

1. "L'appuntamento" (Roberto Carlos, Erasmo Carlos, Bruno Lauzi)
2. "Uomo, uomo" (Luciano Beretta, Donata Giachini, Nicola Aprile)

=== Sentado a la Vera del Camino ===
7" single – CBS 653054 7

1. "Sentado a la Vera del Camino" (Roberto Carlos, Erasmo Carlos)

== Charts ==
Ornella Vanoni version

| Chart (1969–71) | Peak position |
|---|---|
| Italy (Musica e dischi) | 2 |

Eydie Gormé and Roberto Carlos version

| Chart (1988) | Peak position |
|---|---|
| US Hot Latin Songs (Billboard) | 2 |
