= No Child Left Behind (album) =

Studio album by Viking
- Released: March 4, 2015
- Recorded: 2011−2014
- Genre: Thrash metal
- Length: 50:51
- Producer: Ron Eriksen

Viking chronology
Man of Straw (1989)	No Child Left Behind (2015)

No Child Left Behind is the third studio album by American thrash metal band Viking. It was released on March 4, 2015, and is the band's first studio album in 26 years (since 1989's Man of Straw), and their first release with Justin Zych from Zephaniah on guitar and Mike Gonzalez from Dark Angel on bass. Viking did not have an official drummer when they began work on the album in 2011, but the drum studio tracks on this album were played by Gene Hoglan (also a member of Dark Angel).

== Track listing ==
No.	Title	Lyrics	Music	Length
1.	"9:02 on Flight 182"	Ron Eriksen	Gene Hoglan	5:30
2.	"By the Brundlefly"	R. Eriksen	G. Hoglan	3:36
3.	"Blood Eagle"	R. Eriksen	G. Hoglan	4:44
4.	"Debt to Me"	R. Eriksen	G. Hoglan	4:32
5.	"An Ideal Opportunity"	R. Eriksen	G. Hoglan	4:03
6.	"Eaten by a Bear"	R. Eriksen	G. Hoglan	5:44
7.	"Wretched Old Mildred"	R. Eriksen	G. Hoglan	7:24
8.	"A Thousand Reasons I Hate You"	R. Eriksen	G. Hoglan	4:57
9.	"Helen Behind the Door"	R. Eriksen	R. Eriksen	6:09
10.	"Burning from Within"	R. Eriksen	R. Eriksen, B. Eriksen, James Lareau, Matt Jordan	3:58

== Personnel ==
- Ron Eriksen – guitars, vocals
- Justin Zych – guitars
- Mike Gonzalez – bass
- Gene Hoglan – drums
