= HMS Viking =

Two ships of the Royal Navy have been named HMS Viking, after the Vikings, whilst another Viking was in service with the Royal New Zealand Navy:

- HMS Viking (1909) was a Tribal-class destroyer launched in 1909 and sold for scrap in 1919. She was the only six-funnelled vessel to serve in the Royal Navy.
- HMS Viking (P69) was a V-class submarine launched in 1943. She was transferred to the Royal Norwegian Navy in 1946 and renamed HNoMS Utvær. She was sold in 1964.

== See also ==
- HMS Gay Viking was a motor gun boat launched in 1943 and sunk in a collision in 1945. She was originally ordered for the Turkish Navy but was taken over by the Royal Navy due to World War II.
- HMNZS Viking (1937) was a training ketch, known to have been in service with the Royal New Zealand Navy between 1937 and 1945.
- HMS Vindex (1915) was a Royal Navy seaplane carrier of the First World War. She had been built in 1905 by Armstrong Whitworth as Viking, a fast passenger ferry for the Isle of Man Steam Packet.
- Viking (disambiguation)#Ships
