= Atlantic Steam Navigation Company =

Atlantic Steam Navigation Co Ltd
- House flag
- Type: Shipping company
- Industry: Transportation
- Founded: 1934
- Founder: Frank Bustard
- Defunct: 1971
- Successor: European Ferries
- Number of locations: Tilbury, Preston & Lowestoft
- Area served: North Sea & Irish Sea
- Services: Roll-on Roll-off ferries

The Atlantic Steam Navigation Company was founded in 1934 with the original object of providing a no-frills transatlantic passenger service. A combination of difficult economic conditions and then World War II frustrated these early ambitions.

In 1946 the opportunity was taken to lease war-surplus LSTs from the Admiralty and start the world's first roll-on roll-off ferry service. Starting with military charters returning materiel from Europe to England the company progressed to providing commercial services across the Irish Sea and then across the North Sea. In 1971 the company was acquired by European Ferries.

== History ==
=== Genesis of the company ===
The company was founded in 1934 by Frank Bustard, the Passenger Traffic Manager for the White Star Line when the latter was merged with the Cunard Line the same year. The original idea was to set up a low cost line providing cheap passages between Europe and the United States. He first attempted to purchase a number of surplus vessels from the Red Star Line but was unsuccessful. He then approached Vickers Armstrong with designs for two new ships. However the government of the day was not keen on a new company operating on the North Atlantic in competition with Cunard White Star and Bustard was not able to raise a loan from the Bank of England to finance construction. The onset of World War II saw Bustard called up to the Army Reserve and his plans went into abeyance. During the war he was present at trials of landing craft loading and unloading vehicles on the sands of New Brighton.

=== Post World War II ===
After demobilisation, Bustard tried again to implement his transatlantic plans but there were no suitable ships available and no chance of raising finance for a new build. Instead he turned his thoughts to the use of surplus LSTs as vehicle ferries on the short sea routes across the North Sea. After lengthy negotiations with the Admiralty he succeeded in chartering 3 LSTs, 3519, 3534 and 3512. The ships needed modifications to engines, boilers and navigational aids as well as improved accommodation. The maiden voyage of ASN took place on 11 September 1946 when LST3519, now renamed Empire Baltic, sailed from Tilbury with 64 new vehicles for the Dutch Army for delivery in Rotterdam. The company continued to ferry thousands of military vehicles across the North Sea via Hamburg. In 1955 the terminal was transferred from Hamburg to Antwerp.

In 1948 ASN acquired another LST which became the Empire Doric and was used to inaugurate a commercial service between Preston, Lancashire and Larne. Early cargoes included a contract to carry 200 prefabricated houses, lorries loaded with glass from Pilkington's, and a circus. This was the first commercial roll-on roll-off ferry service in the world. It proved so successful that in 1950 the Empire Gaelic was acquired to operate a new service between Preston and Belfast.

In 1952, ASN were chosen to manage a fleet of 12 LSTs for the War Department, operating in the Middle and Far East. They were deployed to Japan during the Korean War. This arrangement continued until 1961 when the operation transferred to the British-India Steam Navigation Company.

=== Nationalisation ===
In April 1954 ASN was nationalised and came under the auspices of the British Transport Commission. With the dissolution of the BTC in 1962 the company was transferred to the Transport Holding Company. In 1968 it became part of the National Freight Corporation, subsequently being sold to European Ferries in 1971.

==== Suez Crisis ====
In late 1956 the entire fleet was sent to the Mediterranean during the Suez Crisis. ASN had to charter in a number of ships to maintain the freight services from Preston. Initially three British coasters were acquired to be replaced by four German ships for the rest of the war. Vehicle services were not resumed until January 1957. At the same time ASN were responsible for the operation of 12 LSTs that had been recommissioned for the duration of the war. These were known as the Seabird class.

==== Post Suez ====
In 1957 ASN ordered their first new ships, Bardic Ferry and Ionic Ferry in a rolling programme to replace the original fleet of LSTs. The ships were designed to carry both vehicles and container traffic, being equipped with their own electric cranes to handle the latter. In addition the main car deck was strengthened to take tanks in the event of the vessels being required for military service. The first of the LSTs to be withdrawn was the Empire Cedric in 1959. The last was the Empire Nordic which survived until 1966. The rest having gone by 1963.

In 1961 ASN started offering container services from Preston to various ports across the Irish Sea using a number of chartered vessels. Starting with parallel services to Larne and Belfast they expanded to serve Drogheda, Dublin and, briefly, Waterford.

In 1965 ASN moved its North Sea base from Tilbury to the expanding port of Felixstowe which reduced the crossing time by half.

In 1969 the founder of the company, Lt-Colonel Frank Bustard was made a Freeman of Larne.

== Routes ==
- 1946 - 1965 Tilbury - Rotterdam
- 1946 - 1955 Tilbury - Hamburg
- 1948 - 1971 Preston - Larne
- 1950 - 1971 Preston - Belfast
- 1955 - 1968 Tilbury - Antwerp
- 1961 - 1971 Preston - Drogheda
- 1963 - 1971 Preston - Dublin
- 1964 - 1966 Preston - Waterford
- 1965 - 1971 Felixstowe - Rotterdam
- 1968 - 1971 Felixstowe - Antwerp

== Fleet ==
=== Chartered from Admiralty ===
The ships names commemorated White Star Liners.

Ship	In service	Notes
SS Empire Baltic	1946–1962	ex LST 3519
SS Empire Cedric	1946–1959	ex LST 3534
SS Empire Celtic	1946–1960	ex LST 3512
SS Empire Doric	1948–1960	ex LST 3041
SS Empire Gaelic	1950–1960	ex LST 3507
SS Empire Cymric	1955–1962	ex LST 3010, ex HMS Attacker
SS Empire Nordic	1955–1966	ex LST 3026, ex HMS Charger

=== Managed ships for RASC ===
1952–1961, named after distinguished RASC officers.

Ship	Notes
RASCV Charles MacLeod	ex LST 3021. Scrapped 1968.
RASCV Evan Gibb	ex LST 3037. Scrapped 1963.
RASCV Frederick Clover	ex LST 3001, sold 1966 and renamed Pacific Pioneer. Scrapped 1968
RASCV Humphrey Gale	ex LST 3509
RASCV Maxwell Brander	ex LST 3024, Sold and renamed Fredrege Isabel in 1968. Scrapped in 1969
RASCV Reginald Kerr	ex LST 3009. Scrapped 1966.
RASCV Snowdon Smith	ex LST 3028, renamed Elbano Primo

=== Managed ships for the War Office ===
Mobilised for the Suez Crisis in late 1956.

Ship	Notes
SS Empire Curlew	ex LST 3042, ex HMS Hunter. Scrapped 1962.
SS Empire Fulmar	ex LST 3524, ex HMS Trumpeter. Scrapped 1969.
SS Empire Gannet	ex LST 3006, ex HMS Tromso. Scrapped 1968.
SS Empire Grebe	ex LST 3038, ex HMS Fighter. Scrapped 1968.
SS Empire Guillemot	ex LST 3525, ex HMS Walcheren. Scrapped 1968.
SS Empire Gull	ex LST 3523, ex HMS Trouncer. Scrapped 1980.
SS Empire Kittiwake	ex LST 3510, ex HMS Slinger. Scrapped 1969.
SS Empire Petrel	ex LST 3520, ex HMS Thruster. Scrapped 1968.
SS Empire Puffin	ex LST 3015, ex HMS Battler. Sold 1960 and scrapped 1966.
SS Empire Shearwater	ex LST 3033, chartered by Townsend Bros in 1959. Scrapped 1963.
SS Empire Skua	ex LST 3517, ex HMS St Nazaire. Scrapped 1968.
SS Empire Tern	ex LST 3504, ex HMS Pursuer. Scrapped 1968.

=== New ships ===
The ships names again reflected ASN's White Star Line heritage.

Ship	In Service	Notes
MV Bardic Ferry	1957–1976	Sold, renamed Nassim II
MV Ionic Ferry	1958–1976	Sold, renamed Kamasin, renamed Tamerlane
MV Cerdic Ferry	1961–1981	Sold, renamed Atlas I, renamed Sifnos
MV Doric Ferry	1962–1981	Sold, renamed Atlas II, renamed Captain Alexandros
MV Gaelic Ferry	1964–1985	Scrapped 1988
MV Baltic Ferry	1965–1968	ex USS LST1081, ex USS Pima County. Sold and renamed Sable Ferry, renamed Nickel Ferry
SS Celtic Ferry	1966–1974	ex USS LSD11, ex HMS Cutlass, ex HMS Northway, ex City of Havana.
MV Europic Ferry	1967–1993	Requisitioned by the Admiralty in 1982 for use in the Falklands War. Renamed European Freighter, sold and renamed Afrodite II, renamed Ajman Glory. Scrapped 2005.

=== Chartered ships ===
==== Suez Crisis ====
ASN's fleet of converted LSTs was requisitioned by the Admiralty so the company had to charter a varied fleet of replacement vessels for the duration.

Ship	Service	Owner	Notes
St Kilda	Aug-Sep 1956	J & A Gardner	
Cliffville	Aug 1956 - Jan 1957	John S Monk	
A R Rawall	Sep 1956		Irish
Kapt Jan Reinecke	Sep 1956 - Jan 1957	J.A. Reinecke	West German
Fidentia	Sep 1956 - Jan 1957	Metcalfe Shipping Company Ltd	
Heinrich Lorenz	Sep 1956 - Jan 1957		West German
Mary Robert Müller	Oct 1956 - Jan 1957	Robert Müller	West German

==== Preston container services ====
With the Admiralty requisitioning the Empire ships, ASN had to rey on chartered vessels to maintain its services across the Irish Sea.

Ship	Owner	Notes
Elisa	A C Hoff	ex Biscaya. Inaugurated ASN's first container service on 1 January 1960.
Goodwill	A C Hoff	
Prior	A C Hoff	renamed Trinitas
Stream Fisher	James Fisher & Sons	
Goodwill Trader	A C Hoff	
Noach	A C Hoff	
Goodwill Merchant	A C Hoff	
Inniscara	British and Irish Steam Packet Company	Irish
Bay Fisher	James Fisher & Sons	
Race Fisher	James Fisher & Sons	
Friso		Dutch
Friendship		
Loch Etive		
Loch Linnhe		Irish
Leven Fisher	James Fisher & Sons	
Eden Fisher	James Fisher & Sons	
River Fisher	James Fisher & Sons	
Firth Fisher	James Fisher & Sons	
Derwent Fisher	James Fisher & Sons	
Clipper	A C Hoff	
Fastnet	Jan Klugkist	Dutch
Goodwill Traveller	A C Hoff	
Curran	Shamrock Shipping Ltd	
Moyle	Shamrock Shipping Ltd	
Cambrian Coast	Coast Lines	
Barbel Bolten	Auguste Bolten	
Orwell Fisher	James Fisher & Sons	
Coria	Dammers & van der Heide	
Solway Fisher	James Fisher & Sons	
Marietta Bolten	Auguste Bolten	
Linda	Dammers & van der Heide	
Poole Fisher	James Fisher & Sons	
Owenglas	Huelin Renouf Shipping Services	
Guernsey Fisher	James Fisher & Sons	

==== Maintenance cover ====
The following ships were chartered from Townsend Thoreson to cover the overhaul period of ASN's ships.

Ship	Years
MS Viking I	1966, 1967
MS Viking II	1965
