= Dark Angel (band) =

American thrash metal band

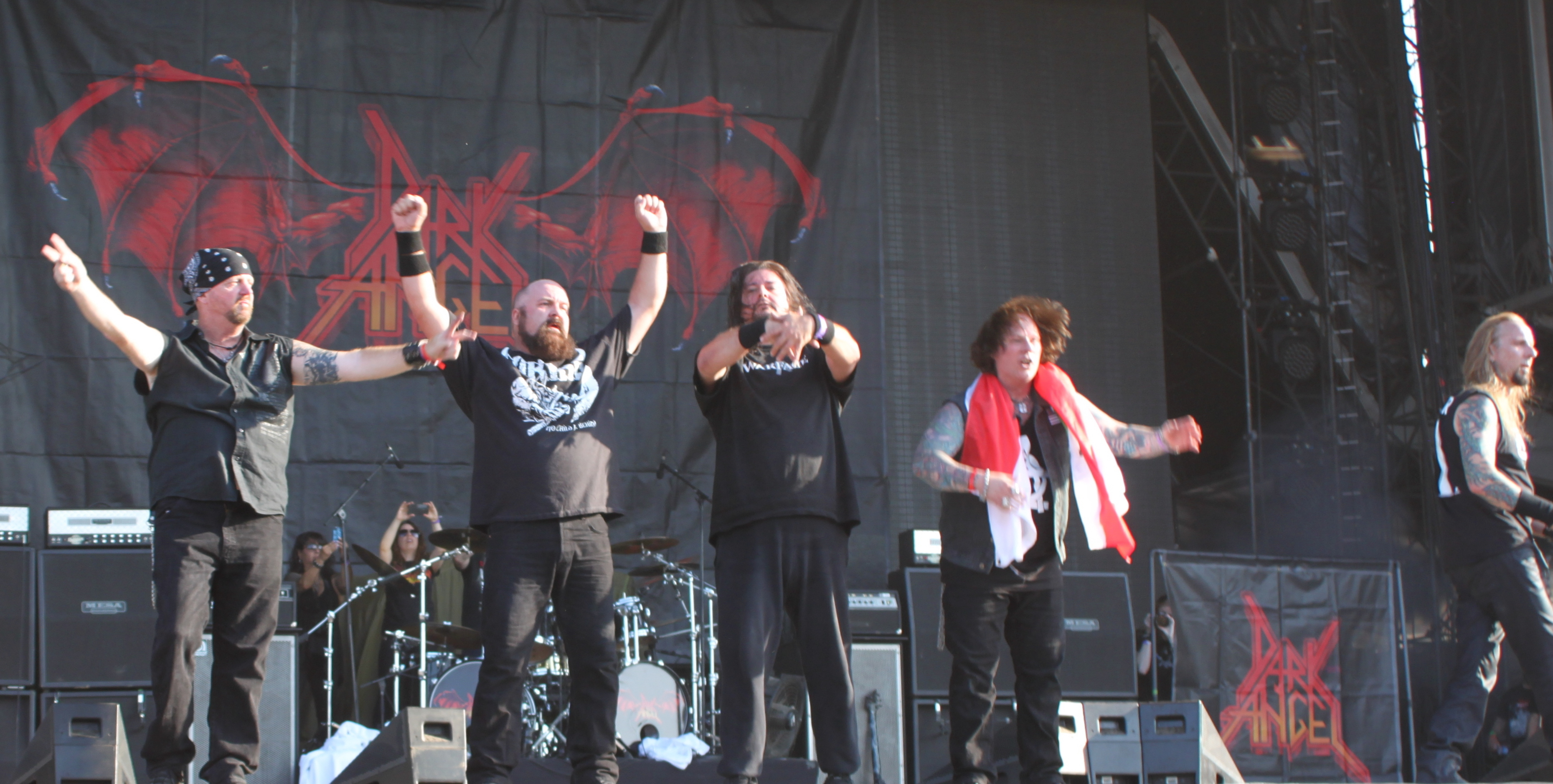
- Dark Angel at Hellfest in 2014

Background information
- Also known as: Shellshock (1981–1983)
- Origin: Downey, California, U.S.
- Genre: Thrash metal
- Years active: 1981–1992; 2002–2005; 2013–present
- Labels: Azra/Metal Storm; Combat; Relativity; Reversed
- Members: Eric Meyer; Gene Hoglan; Ron Rinehart; Mike Gonzalez; Laura Christine
- Past members: See full list

Dark Angel is an American thrash metal band from Downey, California, formed in 1981. Following a breakup in 1992 and a reunion from 2002 to 2005, the band reunited a second time in 2013. Dark Angel's current lineup includes lead guitarist Eric Meyer, drummer Gene Hoglan, lead vocalist Ron Rinehart, bassist Mike Gonzalez, and rhythm guitarist Laura Christine. They have gone through many lineup changes, and as of rhythm guitarist Jim Durkin's death on March 8, 2023, there are no original members left in the current lineup of Dark Angel. Meyer, who joined in 1984, is the only member to appear on all their studio albums.

Dark Angel has released five studio albums to date: We Have Arrived (1985), Darkness Descends (1986), Leave Scars (1989), Time Does Not Heal (1991) and Extinction Level Event (2025). The band's fast, heavy and lengthy songs, tempo changes, lyrics, and extended instrumental parts earned them the nickname "The L.A. Caffeine Machine". Despite never achieving mainstream success, Dark Angel is credited as one of the leaders of the second wave of 1980s thrash metal, and as a progenitor of technical thrash metal. Their music has been cited as a influence on death metal and groove metal.

== History ==
=== Initial career (1981–1992) ===
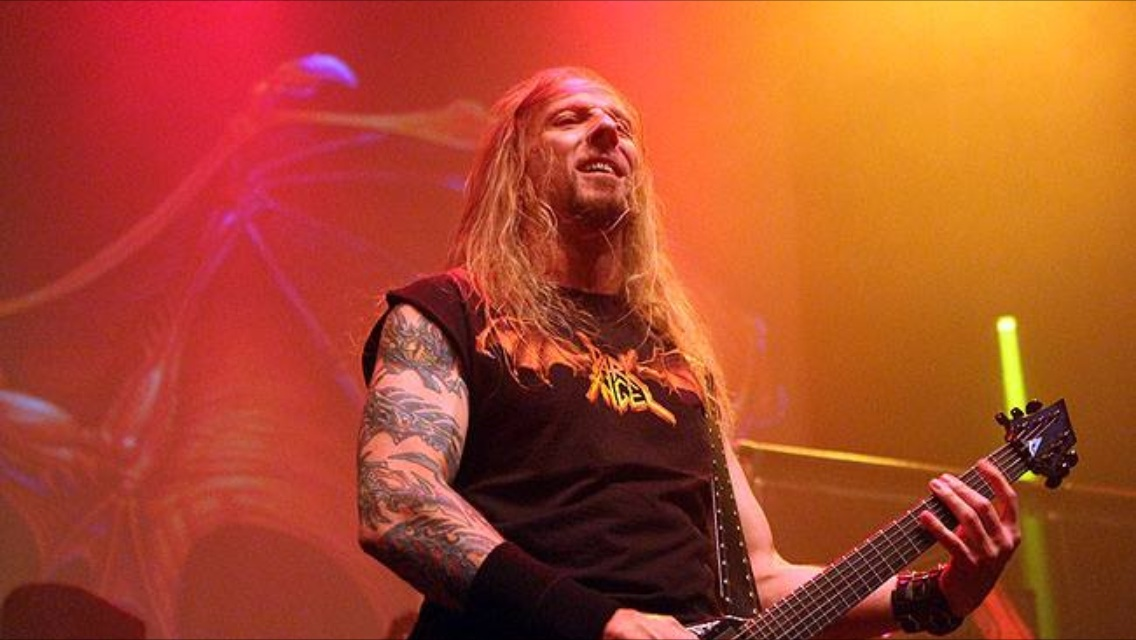
Guitarist Eric Meyer joined Dark Angel in 1984, and is the only member of the band to appear on all of their albums.

Dark Angel was formed in 1981 under the name Shellshock in Downey, California, right around the time when the Los Angeles and Bay Area thrash metal movements were beginning to take place. The band was forced to change its name to Dark Angel in 1983, due to another band using the Shellshock name. They played in local bars and clubs, acquiring a cult following in the metal underground. The band was often compared to Slayer. They began recording and releasing several demos before releasing their debut studio album We Have Arrived in March 1985. Dark Angel promoted We Have Arrived with its first-ever tour, opening for bands like Slayer, Megadeth, Venom, Savage Grace, Corrosion of Conformity, Possessed, D.R.I., Exodus and Agent Steel.

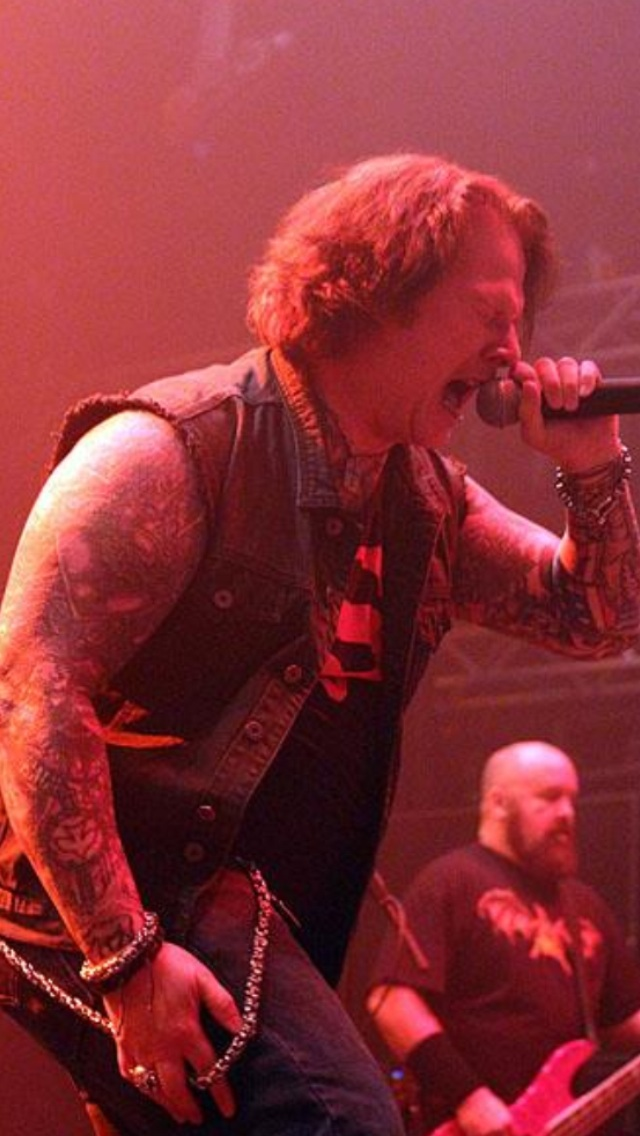
Ron Rinehart (left) joined Dark Angel in 1987, replacing original singer Don Doty. Bassist Mike Gonzalez (right) joined the band in 1986, just before the release Darkness Descends.

In November 1986, Dark Angel released its second studio album, Darkness Descends, which is widely considered to be their seminal release. Around the same time, several other thrash metal bands such as Metallica also released seminal albums and started to gain more popularity. Dark Angel drummer Gene Hoglan said, "If Darkness Descends had come out in August or September instead of November 1986, perhaps things would have been slightly different. Maybe more people would have said, 'Hey, this band is pretty cool,' instead of, 'Well, we had Reign in Blood last month, and everything sucks after that.' [Laughs] People were pretty ruthless back then — they would call us 'Slayer babies' and things like that." Although Darkness Descends did not initially reach the Billboard 200 charts or become a commercial success, Dark Angel toured heavily behind the album throughout 1986 and 1987, playing with bands like Motörhead, Megadeth, Possessed, Slayer, Overkill, Sacred Reich, Whiplash, Cryptic Slaughter and the Crumbsuckers. In early 1987, in the middle of the Darkness Descends tour, Doty left the band in order to start a family. Hoglan recalls, "Sometimes it was a challenge just to get him to rehearsals. But back then I was very naive when it came to drugs and other ancillary activities that one might be involved in — it wasn't a part of my life, so I didn't really pay attention to things like that. So I didn't think we had many problems as a band, but it started to become more obvious between the release of the record in November 1986 and the start of the tour with Possessed in January 1987. And obviously, the real sign that something was wrong was when he backed out of the tour just a few days before the first date, which forced us to hire Jim Drabos to replace him."

Drabos proved to be a temporary replacement, and left the band and became a police officer after the tour. He was replaced by Ron Rinehart, who would stay with the band until their breakup in 1992 and rejoin for their subsequent reunions. Dark Angel performed its first show with Rinehart at the Fender's Ballroom in Long Beach, California on January 29, 1988.

Around this time, Dave Mustaine asked guitarist Eric Meyer to join Megadeth, but he declined in order to stay with Dark Angel. According to an interview in Voices from the Dark Side, Meyer claims he did not feel comfortable with the situation.

In January 1989, Dark Angel released its third studio album Leave Scars, which was their first release with Rinehart on vocals and Mike Gonzalez on bass, and their last with guitarist Jim Durkin, who left the band during a tour with Death and was replaced by former Viking guitarist Brett Eriksen, leaving the band with no remaining original members. Hogland recalled Durkin's departure, "It's a rather nebulous story, and I've never really gone into it with Jim, but there was something going on in his life that mandated that he pretty much leave the tour right this minute. He never came to any of us and said what was going on, and I admit that I wasn’t the happiest about it at the time. But Jim was my brother and my friend. And not long after he left, we got in touch with each other and talked, and I told Jim that I just wanted him to be happy. But we've never really spoken about why he left — there are details there that I don't need to know." Leave Scars also became Dark Angel's only album to enter the Billboard 200 charts, peaking at number 159. Leave Scars received positive reviews from music critics, and saw the band garner media attention and publicity, with coverage from Kerrang! and RIP Magazine. In support of the album, they toured throughout 1989 and 1990 with several bands, including Death, Nuclear Assault, Acid Reign, Candlemass and Overkill. A live album, recorded at the Country Club in Reseda on April 22, 1989, was released in 1990 as Live Scars.

Dark Angel released their fourth studio album, Time Does Not Heal, in February 1991. Time Does Not Heal showed increasingly progressive song structures (famously advertising its "246 riffs"), and Hoglan's lyrics dealing with social issues, including politics, apathy, psychological issues and trauma. To promote Time Does Not Heal, Dark Angel embarked on the "Years of Pain" world tour, supported by such bands as Exhorder, Mordred and Re-Animator.

=== First breakup (1992–1999) ===
Rinehart's departure from the band, as well as aborted attempts to work on its fifth album Atrocity Exhibition, resulted in Dark Angel's first breakup in September 1992. Hoglan has indicated that this was an amicable split, telling Heavy magazine in 2019 that, "We've always been close and tight. We never went our separate ways out of animosity by any means. It was just time to make a move back in '92 when we kind of dissolved Dark Angel, I guess."

Hoglan went on to collaborate on a number of musical projects. He achieved greater attention during the mid-1990s playing with Death, at the same time that bandleader Chuck Schuldiner was taking his band into a more progressive style. Subsequently, he recorded one album with Bay Area thrash metal band Testament, and made the acquaintance of Canadian multi-instrumentalist Devin Townsend, forging a lasting friendship. He had since recorded several albums with Townsend, both as part of the speed/industrial/death metal band Strapping Young Lad and under Townsend's name.

Rinehart formed the band Oil in 1997 after converting to Christianity.

=== First reunion and second hiatus (1999–2005) ===
Tentative plans for a Dark Angel reunion tour in 1999 were scrapped, due to personal and artistic differences between its members. However, the band officially reformed in 2002 with a new lineup that included Ron Rinehart on vocals, Eric Meyer on guitar, Danyael Williams on bass and Gene Hoglan on drums.

During the reunion, Dark Angel recorded a cover of "Creeping Death", which appeared on the 2004 Metallica tribute album Metallic Attack: The Ultimate Tribute.

By 2005, Rinehart had begun suffering health problems, and an accident that year, which caused a severe spinal injury that was apparently so serious, that if Rinehart had continued singing it could have resulted in him being unable to talk. This resulted in Dark Angel's second breakup.

=== Second reunion (2013–2023) ===
On August 10, 2013, it was reported that Dark Angel had reunited with original vocalist Don Doty, and would headline Keep It True XVII festival in Germany in April 2014. It was also reported that drummer Gene Hoglan, guitarists Eric Meyer and Justin Zych, and bassist Mike Gonzalez would be involved in the reunion.

On August 16, 2013, six days after the "reunion" was announced, Doty and Hoglan released statements addressing the "reunion rumors" in an attempt to "put any confusion to rest." Hoglan admitted that he and the members of Dark Angel had been "talking about doing something" in 2014, and stated that some shows could be in the works, but "right now it's just speculation." Hoglan also stated that, due to his commitments with Testament and Dethklok, the band was "moving forward s-l-o-w-l-y." Doty also commented on the reunion rumors, stating, "When talks are complete, a statement will be given. We will know more in the months to come. We will let you know as it unravels." When asked on August 21, 2013, about the reunion, Hoglan replied, "The latest is that we are talking about doing one. We will definitely keep everybody posted when there is something solid to talk about."

On September 4, 2013, Dark Angel's management confirmed that the band would be reuniting for "limited number of appearances in the U.S. and select festivals in Europe" in 2014, and added that the dates were "still pending" and had "not yet been booked at this time." Their management also confirmed that the lineup for the "rare and unique, select 2014 shows" was the Leave Scars lineup of Hoglan, Meyer, Jim Durkin (guitar), Ron Rinehart (vocals) and Michael Gonzalez (bass). On the following day, it was announced that Dark Angel had been dropped from the Keep It True XVII festival due to multiple issues with the reunion.

On October 13, 2013, Dark Angel confirmed that they were officially active again, and posted a 17-second rehearsal clip, titled "DFA is back!", on YouTube.

On November 1, 2014, it was announced that Dark Angel was working on new material for their first album in more than 20 years. Progress on a new album had been slow for roughly more than a decade, due to Hoglan's schedules with Testament, Death to All and other projects, as well as the band members living far apart from one another and wanting to take their time with perfecting the material.

On April 5, 2016, it was announced that Dark Angel would celebrate their 30th anniversary by playing a show on October 8 at the Vogue Theatre in Vancouver, British Columbia, Canada. At that show, they were going to play the Darkness Descends album in its entirety as well as songs from their 1991 album Time Does Not Heal. The concert was cancelled "due to circumstances beyond [the band's] control."

Hoglan announced in January 2022 that Dark Angel was "moving forward" with writing a new album and they were intending "to be in the studio before the end of this year." Hoglan later stated the album would likely be released in 2023.

=== Deaths of band members, Extinction Level Event and possible sixth studio album (2023–present) ===
On March 8, 2023, founding guitarist Jim Durkin died at the age of 58, leaving the band with no original members. Durkin had been absent from Dark Angel's live activities since 2020 due to personal matters, and he requested Hoglan's wife Laura Christine to take his place. After Durkin's death, the band announced that they would be continuing in his memory, with Christine as Durkin's permanent replacement, and that their fifth album would be released in 2023 or 2024.

Former Dark Angel drummer Lee Rauch died on June 25, 2023, at the age of 58.

Hoglan had stated that the fifth Dark Angel album would serve as a tribute to Durkin. On July 25, 2024, Hoglan confirmed in a video message posted on social media that the band had begun recording their new album and he had "just finished the drums to" it. They released a video teaser for the album via social media on March 19, 2025, confirming that it would be released later in the year on Reversed Records. Two days later, the band debuted two new songs, "Circular Firing Squad" and the album's title track "Extinction Level Event", during a performance in Buenos Aires. They performed the same tracks two days later in Santiago, Chile. The band revealed the artwork for the album in April 1, 2025. "Extinction Level Event" was released as the album's lead single ten days later; critical reaction to it was generally mixed, with a majority of the criticism directed at Ron Rinehart's vocals. Hoglan confirmed in May 2025 that Extinction Level Event would be released "before the end of the fourth quarter" of the year. The album's second single "Circular Firing Squad" was released a month later on streaming services. Extinction Level Event was released on September 5, 2025, and in support of the album, Dark Angel embarked on its first North American tour in more than three decades.

When asked in an August 2025 interview with Metal Rules if he had "many songs in [his] can that [he] could start writing" another Dark Angel album, Hoglan said, "I'm not even thinking about that. But yeah, we have an entire unrecorded album's worth of material from 30 years ago that when Jim Durkin heard it, he was like, 'Holy crap, let's make this our next record.' I was like, 'Wait a minute, Jim. Let's write from the ground up.' So we have shit tons of songs. But that doesn't mean I'm ready to commit any of those old songs to new stuff. I'm not ready to do that yet. But writing thrash metal, that's the easiest thing in the world for me. I wrote this album in two months. Four months, I guess."

Hoglan announced in April 2026 that the band was "no longer associated" with Reversed Records. Dark Angel will resume live activities by supporting Death to All on a four-date Australian tour in January 2027, with Hoglan performing double duties. Hoglan revealed in November 2026 that new music from Dark Angel should be released "before the end of the year", though he implied that it could be pushed back to 2027: "If I am incorrect, then I'm only going to be incorrect by a month or two. And it's very, very exciting news".

== Style and legacy ==
Dark Angel's musical style is mainly labeled as thrash metal, with influences and inspirations coming from a variety of musical genres, including traditional heavy metal, progressive rock, punk and doom metal, as well as the new wave of British heavy metal (NWOBHM) and Bay Area thrash metal scenes of the 1980s. Eduardo Rivadavia of AllMusic notes that Dark Angel is known for their "speed, power, and imagination", and adds that, although the band "only had a few tricks at their disposal", they "[executed] them extremely well." The band's motto is "too fast my ass".

Dark Angel has been cited as an influence by several metal bands, including Pantera, Sepultura, Cannibal Corpse, Morbid Angel, At the Gates, Incantation, and Exhorder.

== Band members ==
=== Current members ===
- Eric Meyer – lead guitar, backing vocals (1984–1992, 2002–2005, 2013–present)
- Gene Hoglan – drums (1984–1992, 2002–2005, 2013–present)
- Ron Rinehart – lead vocals (1987–1992, 2002–2005, 2013–present)
- Mike Gonzalez – bass (1986–1992, 2013–present)
- Laura Christine – rhythm guitar (2023–present; live member: 2020–2023)

=== Former members ===
- Jim Durkin – rhythm guitar (1981–1989, 2013–2020; hiatus 2020–2023; his death)
- Don Doty – lead vocals (1981–1987)
- Rob Yahn – bass (1981–1986)
- Mike Andrade – drums (1981–1983)
- Jack Schwartz – drums (1983–1984)
- Bob Gourley – drums (1984)
- Lee Rauch – drums (1984; died 2023)
- Jim Drabos – lead vocals (1987)
- Brett Eriksen – rhythm guitar (1989–1991)
- Cris McCarthy – rhythm guitar (1991–1992)
- Danyael Williams – bass (2002–2005)

== Discography ==
=== Studio albums ===
- We Have Arrived (1985)
- Darkness Descends (1986)
- Leave Scars (1989)
- Time Does Not Heal (1991)
- Extinction Level Event (2025)

=== Live albums ===
- Live Scars (1990)

=== Compilation albums ===
- Decade of Chaos: The Best of Dark Angel (1992)

=== Demos ===
- Gonna Burn (1983)
- Demo II (1983)
- Live Demo (1984)
- Live Demo from Berkeley (1985)
- Atrocity Exhibition (1992)

=== Singles ===
- "Merciless Death" (1985)
- "Act of Contrition" (1991)
- "Extinction Level Event" (2025)
- "Circular Firing Squad" (2025)

=== Video albums ===
- Ultimate Revenge 2 (VHS and CD) (1989)
- 3-Way Thrash (VHS and Laserdisc) (1990)

=== Other appearances ===
- Cover of "Creeping Death" on Metallic Attack: Metallica - The Ultimate Tribute (2004)
