= SS Empire Fulmar =

Two ships have been named Empire Fulmar:

- SS Empire Fulmar (1941), a cargo liner in service during World War II
- SS Empire Fulmar (1945), an LST 3 in service 1956-68
