= Viking (nickname) =

As a nickname, Viking or The Viking may refer to:

== People nicknamed The Viking ==
- Andy Fordham, an English professional darts player.
- RG Snyman, South African rugby union player

== See also ==
- Viking (disambiguation)
- Viking (given name)
- Techno Viking
