= Man of Straw (album) =

1989 studio album by Viking

Studio album by Viking
- Released: August 8, 1989
- Recorded: December 1988−February 1989
- Studio: Track Record in North Hollywood, California
- Genre: Thrash metal
- Length: 46:47
- Label: Metal Blade/Caroline Records
- Producers: Ron Eriksen, Brian Slagel (exec.)

Viking chronology
Do or Die (1988)	Man of Straw (1989)	No Child Left Behind (2015)

Man of Straw is the second studio album by the American thrash metal band Viking. It was released on August 8, 1989 through Metal Blade/Caroline Records, and was the band's last album before their 21-year breakup from 1990 to 2011. Man of Straw was produced by Viking's lead singer and guitarist Ron Eriksen, and like their previous album Do or Die, it was executive produced by Metal Blade founder Brian Slagel.

== Track listing ==
No.	Title	Lyrics	Music	Length
1.	"White Death"	Ron Eriksen	Brett Eriksen	5:21
2.	"They Raped the Land"	R. Eriksen	Matt Jordan	6:20
3.	"Twilight Fate"	R. Eriksen	R. Eriksen, B. Eriksen	3:37
4.	"The Trial"	R. Eriksen	James Lareau, R. Eriksen	3:42
5.	"Case of the Stubborns"	R. Eriksen, Jordan	R. Eriksen	4:35
6.	"Winter"	B. Eriksen, R. Eriksen	R. Eriksen	7:44
7.	"Hell Is For Children"	Pat Benatar, Roger Capps	Neil Giraldo	4:11
8.	"Creative Divorce"	R. Eriksen	B. Eriksen, Jordan	6:23
9.	"Man of Straw"	R. Eriksen	Laureau, R. Eriksen, Jordan, B. Eriksen	4:54
Total length:				46:47

== Bonus track ==
No.	Title	Lyrics	Music	Length
10.	"Abortuary"	R. Eriksen	R. Eriksen	6:05
Total length:				52:52

== Personnel ==
- Ron Eriksen - Vocals, Guitar
- Brett Eriksen - Guitar
- James Lareau - Bass
- Matt Jordan - Drums
