= USS Pima County =

Tank landing ship of the US Navy

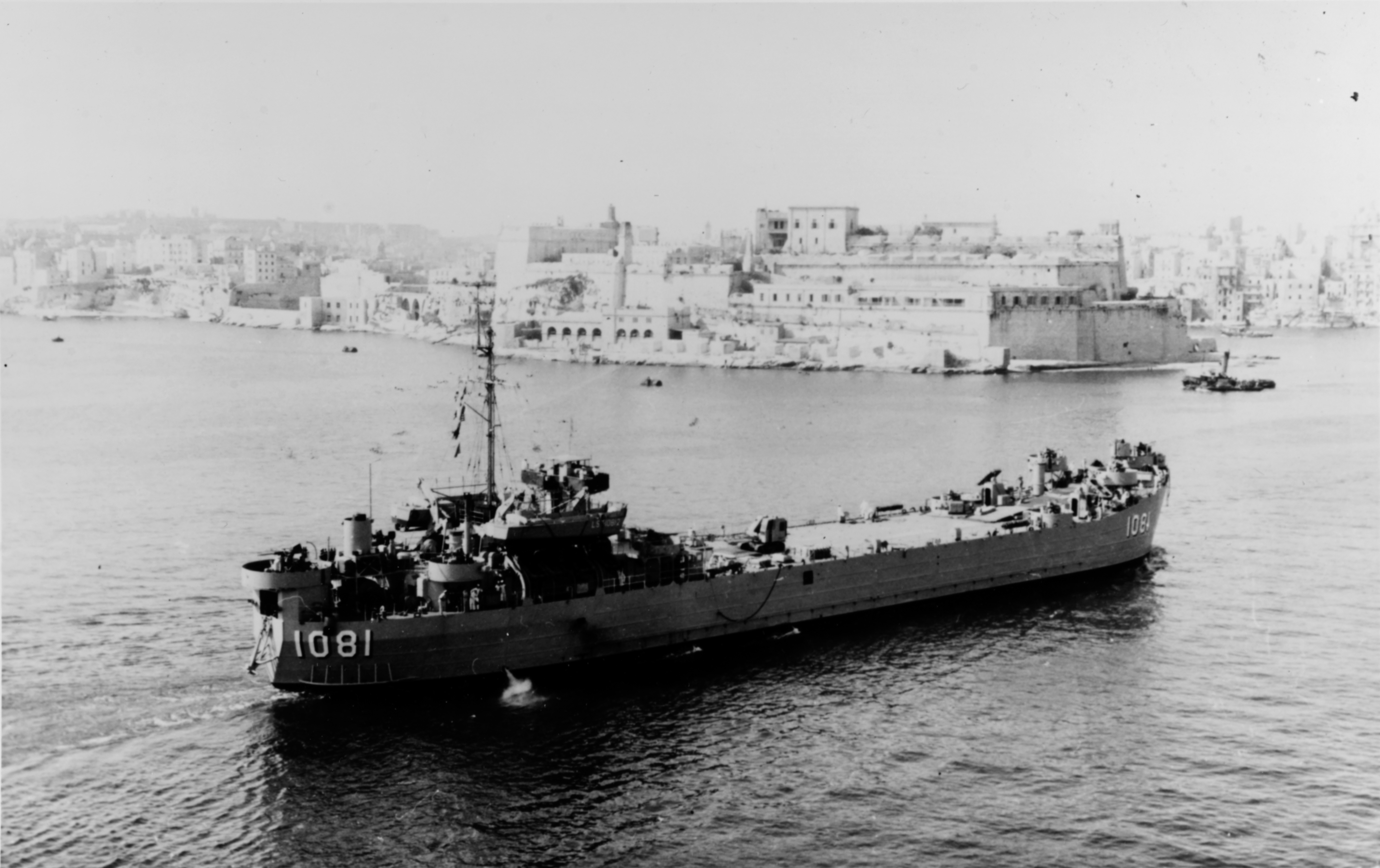
- Entering the Grand Harbour, Malta on 14 June 1955

History

United States
- Name: LST-1081(1945–1955); Pima County (1955–1956); 518 N (1960–1965); Baltic Ferry (1965–1972); Sable Ferry (1972–1977); Nickel Ferry (1977–1979)
- Namesake: Pima County, Arizona
- Owner: United States Navy (1945–1960); United States Leasing Corporation (1960–1965); Atlantic Steam Navigation Company (1965–1972); Unknown company (1972–1977); Mareantes Mundial Armadora (1977–1979)
- Operator: United States Navy (1945–1960); United States Leasing Corporation (1960–1965); Atlantic Steam Navigation Company (1965–1972); Unknown company (1972–1977); Andy International (1977–1979)
- Port of registry: (United States) US Navy (1945–1960); United States (1960–1965); United Kingdom (1965–1972); Panama (1977–1979)
- Builder: American Bridge Company, Ambridge, Pennsylvania
- Laid down: 13 November 1944
- Launched: 5 January 1945
- Commissioned: 30 January 1945
- Recommissioned: 2 February 1951
- Decommissioned: 30 July 1946
- Reclassified: Reserve status from 7 August 1956; Decommissioned 12 December 1956; Sold from Naval reserve June 1960
- Identification: Maritime call sign HOFU (1977–1979); IMO number: 6604133
- Fate: Wrecked by fire 1 December 1979

General characteristics in military service
- Class & type: LST-542-class LST
- Displacement: 4,080 long tons (4,150 t) fully laden
- Length: 328 ft (100 m)
- Beam: 50 ft (15 m)
- Draft: 14 ft 1 in (4.29 m)
- Propulsion: Two 12-cylinder 2-stroke single acting oil engines
- Speed: 11.6 knots (21.5 km/h; 13.3 mph) maximum
- Troops: 147
- Complement: 119
- Armament: 8 × Bofors 40 mm L/60 guns; 12 × Oerlikon 20 mm cannon

General characteristics in commercial service
- Tonnage: 1,909 gross register tonnage (as Baltic Ferry); 1,908 gross register tonnage (as Nickel Ferry)
- Displacement: 3,591 long tons (3,649 t) (as 518 N)
- Length: 327 ft 9 in (99.90 m) (as Baltic Ferry)
- Beam: 50 ft 2 in (15.29 m) (as Baltic Ferry)
- Draft: 10 ft 8 in (3.25 m) (as Baltic Ferry)
- Speed: Around 12 knots (22 km/h; 14 mph) maximum (as Baltic Ferry)

USS Pima County (LST-1081) was an LST-542-class tank landing ship of the United States Navy. Built as LST-1081 by the American Bridge Company in Ambridge, Pennsylvania from 13 November 1944, she was commissioned into the navy on 30 January 1945. LST-1081 saw service as a logistics vessel in the latter stages of the Pacific War, but was placed into reserve and decommissioned after the war. She was recommissioned in 1950 after the outbreak of the Korean War and served with the Atlantic Fleet, including a deployment in the Mediterranean Sea during which she was renamed USS Pima County. She returned to the reserve in 1956 and was decommissioned on 12 December of that year.

In June 1960 Pima County was sold to the United States Leasing Corporation, with whom she served as the freighter 518 N. She was acquired by the British government-owned Atlantic Steam Navigation Company (ASN) in 1965 and served as the freight vessel Baltic Ferry. The ASN carried out a refurbishment at Smith's Dock Company after which she served on routes from Great Britain to Northern Ireland and continental Europe. Baltic Ferry was laid up for a period in the late 1960s and in 1972 was sold to a company that operated her as Sable Ferry in North America. She was sold again in 1977 to Mareantes Mundial Armadora and, under the name Nickel Ferry, was operated by Andy International on routes in Central America. She caught fire off La Unión, El Salvador on 1 December 1979 and was rendered a total wreck.

== Construction ==
LST-1081 was an LST-542-class tank landing ship. The tank landing ship was designed to land large numbers of tanks directly onto a hostile shore via a bow ramp. From 1942 large numbers of these vessels, initially the LST-1 class, were built in the US to support the Allied war effort during World War II. From July 1943 the design was modified to the LST-491 class with internal ramps instead of an elevator and from November 1943 the LST-542 class was introduced which added a raised conn, water distillation system and improved armament. The LST-542s also had a stronger weather deck and altered exhaust system. The vessels cost around $1.6 million to construct. A total of 1,051 LSTs were built, including 612 of the LST-542 class. They were numbered sequentially, reaching LST-1152, as 100 vessels with lower numbers were cancelled.

LST-1081 was built by the American Bridge Company; she was laid down at their yard on the Ohio River at Ambridge, Pennsylvania on 13 November 1944. LST-1081 was launched on 5 January 1945. LST-1081 measured 328 feet (100 m) in length, 50 feet (15 m) in beam and had a draft of 14 feet 1 inch (4.29 m). She had a complement of 119 and was capable of carrying 147 passengers in addition to quantities of cargo and vehicles. Fully laden she had a displacement of 4,080 long tons (4,150 t) and was capable of a maximum speed of 11.6 knots (21.5 km/h; 13.3 mph). She was fitted with two 12-cylinder 2-stroke single acting oil engines, manufactured by General Motors in Cleveland, Ohio. LST-1081 was armed with eight Bofors 40 mm L/60 guns and twelve Oerlikon 20 mm cannon. She was commissioned into the United States Navy on 30 January 1945, under the command of an officer of the United States Navy Reserve.

== Naval service ==
LST-1081 sailed from Ambridge by the end of January for New Orleans from where she commenced a shakedown cruise in St. Andrews Bay, Florida on 7 February. Upon completion of the cruise she was loaded with cargo and dispatched to Pearl Harbor, Hawaii, which she reached on 4 April, having transited the Panama Canal on 12 March. LST-1081 left Pearl Harbor on 19 April and was employed on logistics duties during the later stages of the Pacific War, transferring supplies between various islands. She was at Kwajalein Atoll in the Marshall Islands on 8 May, at Roi Namur in the same island group on 20 May and at Guam between 27 May and 10 June. She served at Ulithi in the Caroline Islands between 12 and 28 June and at the Japanese island of Okinawa between 4 and 15 July, shortly after the end of the Battle of Okinawa. LST-1081 spent 29 July to 12 August in the Northern Mariana Islands, at Tinian and Saipan and was at Pearl Harbor between 27 and 31 August.

The Pacific War ended on 2 September 1945; returned to Saipan on 18 September and between 19 and 25 October was in Manila, the Philippines. In December she returned to Saipan and was back at Pearl Harbor on 5 January, from which she was ordered to the US west coast. From 16 January 1946 she was overhauled at San Francisco, ahead of an anticipated period of inactivation. On 1 February she was allocated to the 19th Fleet and when that fleet became the Pacific Reserve Fleet she was assigned to its Columbia River group. LST-1081 was decommissioned on 30 July 1946.

After the North Korean invasion started the Korean War on 25 June 1950, LST-1081 was reactivated as part of a wider expansion of US armed forces. She was ordered to reactivate on 7 August 1950, was recommissioned on 2 February 1951 and assigned to a home yard in Puget Sound. After a shakedown cruise on the Pacific Coast she was reassigned to the US east coast. LST-1081 departed from San Diego on 13 June 1951 and, travelling via the Panama Canal, Puerto Rico and Morehead City, North Carolina, reached her new base at Norfolk, Virginia on 12 July. Assigned to the Amphibious Forces of the Atlantic Fleet, LST-1081 conducted training operations from Naval Amphibious Base Little Creek. From October 1952 she was commanded by Lieutenant John G. Finneran, a future navy vice admiral.

LST-1081 deployed to the Mediterranean Sea from 14 April 1955 and during this deployment, on 1 July, was renamed USS Pima County, after a county in southern Arizona. She returned to Little Creek on 4 October where she remained until she was placed back into reserve on 7 August 1956. She was transferred to the Atlantic Reserve Fleet and moved to Green Cove Springs, Florida where she was decommissioned for the final time on 12 December 1956. Pima County was struck from the navy list on 1 November 1958.

== Merchant service ==
Pima County was sold by the navy in June 1960. By 1962 she had been registered as a merchant ship by the San Francisco-based United States Leasing Corporation and was stated to have a displacement of 3,591 long tons (3,649 t). Under the name 518 N she operated as a freighter based out of Omaha, Nebraska, presumably on the Missouri River.

The vessel was purchased by the British government-owned Atlantic Steam Navigation Company in 1965 as part of a rapid expansion in drive-on freight vessels. She was renamed Baltic Ferry and towed across the Atlantic to the yards of the Smith's Dock Company on the River Tyne. She was refurbished with changes to her crew accommodation and bridge structure. Her exhaust, which was previously piped out the stern, was rerouted to two new funnels. After the refit her characteristics were remeasured at 327 feet 9 inches (99.90 m) length, 50 feet 2 inches (15.29 m) breadth and 10 feet 8 inches (3.25 m) draft; her speed was around 12 knots (22 km/h; 14 mph). Baltic Ferry's gross register tonnage was 1,909 and all loading was carried out via her bow doors; she had no passenger accommodation. She was sailed under a British ship registration. Freight was carried on her single main deck and she had a capacity of around 45 vehicles or trailers.

Baltic Ferry operated initially on Great Britain to Northern Ireland and Great Britain to continental Europe routes. At least one route ran to Belfast Harbour where, lacking deck-mounted cranes, she was unable to unload unit loads prior to the construction of a new terminal there. In 1966 she operated between Tilbury, Essex, and Felixstowe, Suffolk, until early July when she switched to the Preston, Lancashire to Larne, County Antrim route. For much of the following two years she was laid up, unused, at Barrow-in-Furness. She was sold in 1972 and renamed Sable Ferry, operating in North America. She was bought by Mareantes Mundial Armadora in 1977, renamed Nickel Ferry, and operated by Andy International on routes in Central America as a 1,908-gross register ton, Panamanian-flagged freighter. Her maritime call sign in this incarnation was HOFU. She caught fire while lying at La Unión, El Salvador on 1 December 1979. Lloyd's Register records that Nickel Ferry was notified as an irrecoverable total wreck by the end of that year.
