= Do or Die (Viking album) =

Studio album by Viking
- Released: February 1, 1988
- Recorded: September–October 1987
- Studio: Adamo's Recording
- Genre: Thrash metal
- Length: 32:10
- Label: Metal Blade
- Producer: Viking, Brian Slagel (exec.)

Viking chronology
Do or Die (1988)	Man of Straw (1989)

Professional ratings
Review scores
Source	Rating
Collector's Guide to Heavy Metal	6/10

Do or Die is the first studio album by the American thrash metal band Viking. It was released on February 1, 1988, through Metal Blade Records and executive produced by the label's founder Brian Slagel. There has never been an official CD release of this album, although bootleg copies have been available.

== Track listing ==
Side one
No.	Title	Lyrics	Music	Length
1.	"Warlord"	Matt Jordan, Ron Eriksen	Brett Eriksen, Ron Eriksen	4:14
2.	"Hellbound"	R. Eriksen	R. Eriksen	2:37
3.	"Militia of Death"	R. Eriksen	James Lareau, R. Eriksen	2:39
4.	"Prelude/Scavenger"	Jordan	B. Eriksen	3:46
5.	"Valhalla"	Jorden, R. Eriksen	B. Eriksen	3:17

Side two
No.	Title	Lyrics	Music	Length
6.	"Burning From Within"	Jordan, R. Eriksen	B. Eriksen, R. Eriksen	3:35
7.	"Berserker"	Jordan	B. Eriksen	3:37
8.	"Killer Unleashed"	R. Eriksen	B. Eriksen	4:00
9.	"Do or Die"	R. Eriksen	B. Eriksen	4:25
Total length:				32:10

== Personnel ==
Viking

- Ron Eriksen - vocals, guitar
- Brett Eriksen - guitar
- James Lareau - bass
- Matt Jordan - drums

Production

- Jerry Adamowicz - engineer
- Brian Slagel - executive producer
