= SS Empire Fulmar (1945) =

World War II merchant ship of the United Kingdom

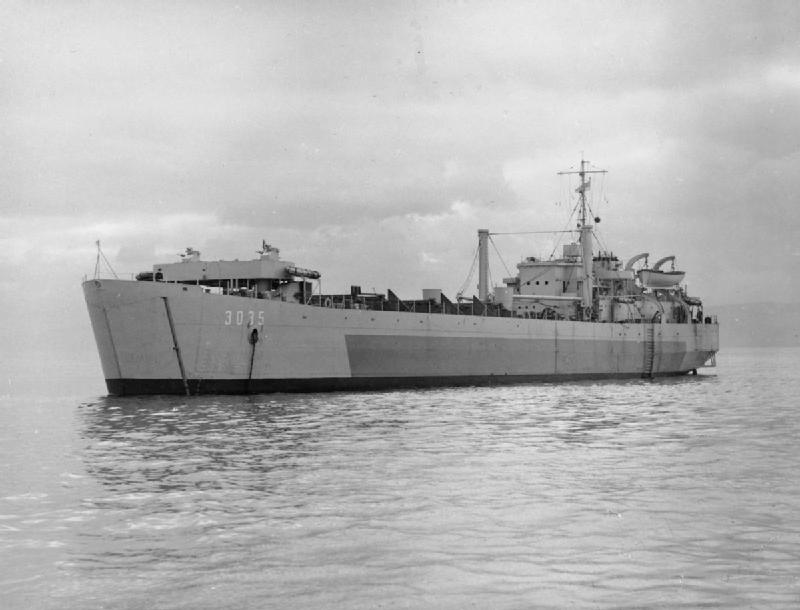
- HMS LST 3035, an LST (3)

History
- Name: HMS LST 3524 (1945-47); HMS Trumpeter (1947-56); Empire Fulmar (1956-69)
- Owner: Royal Navy (1945-56); Ministry of Transport (1956-69)
- Operator: Royal Navy (1945-56); Atlantic Steam Navigation Co. (1956-61); British India Steam Navigation Co. (1961-69)
- Port of registry: Royal Navy (1945-56); United Kingdom (1956-69)
- Ordered: 28 April 1944
- Builder: Davie Shipbuilding, Lauzon
- Yard number: 571
- Launched: 25 July 1945
- Commissioned: 6 November 1945
- Fate: Scrapped 1969

General characteristics
- Class & type: LST (3)
- Tonnage: 4,267 GRT
- Length: 330 ft 0 in (100.58 m) between perpendiculars; 347 ft 5 in (105.89 m) overall
- Beam: 55 ft 0 in (16.76 m)
- Draught: 12 ft 0 in (3.66 m) maximum
- Depth: 26 ft 4 in (8.03 m)
- Installed power: Triple expansion steam engine, 1,500 IHP
- Propulsion: Twin screw propellers
- Speed: 13 knots (24 km/h)
- Capacity: 168 troops; or 7 LCMs; or 18 tanks; or 27 trucks
- Crew: 115

Empire Fulmar was a LST (3) which was built in 1945 by Davie Shipbuilding & Repairing Co Ltd as HMS LST 3524 for the Royal Navy. She was renamed HMS Trumpeter in 1947. She was transferred to the Ministry of Transport in 1956 and renamed Empire Fulmar, serving in the Suez Crisis. She was later laid up in Singapore and was scrapped there in 1969.

== Description ==
The ship was 330 ft 0 in (100.58 m) long between perpendiculars (347 ft 5 in (105.89 m) overall), with a beam of 55 ft 0 in (16.76400 m). She had a depth of 26 ft 4 in (8.03 m), and a draught of 4 ft 5 in (1.35 m) forward in beaching mode and 12 ft 0 in (3.66 m) maximum. She was assessed at 4,267 GRT.

The ship was propelled by a triple expansion steam engine. The engine was built by the Canadian Pacific Railway. Rated at 1,500IHP, it drove twin screw propellers. The engine could propel the ship at a speed of 13 knots (24 km/h), but her normal cruising speed was 10 knots (19 km/h). Fuel consumption was 40 tons per day at 9.5 knots (17.6 km/h).

She had a complement of 115 officers and men, and could carry 168 troops, or 7 LCMs or 18 40-ton tanks or 27 trucks.

== History ==
HMS LST 3524 was ordered on 28 April 1944. She was built as yard number 571 in 1945 by Davie Shipbuilding & Repairing Co Ltd, Lauzon, Quebec, Canada. She was launched on 25 July 1945. In 1947, she was renamed HMS Trumpeter. She was later laid up in the Clyde.

In 1956, HMS Trumpeter was transferred to the Ministry of Transport and renamed Empire Fulmar She was operated under the management of the Atlantic Steam Navigation Company. She was used by the British Army as a ferry during the Suez Crisis. In 1961, management was transferred to the British India Steam Navigation Company. Empire Fulmar was involved in the British aid effort to Zambia in December 1965, carrying 2,200 drums of oil from Aden to Dar-es-Salaam, Tanzania. She was laid up at Singapore in 1968. Offered for sale in May 1968, she was scrapped in January 1969.
