= Viking (given name) =

Viking is a given name which may refer to:

- Viking (Norse mythology), father of Thorstein, from Þorsteins saga Víkingssonar
- Viking Björk (1918–2009), Swedish cardiac surgeon
- Viking Dahl (1895–1945), Swedish composer, as well as a painter and author
- Viking Eggeling (1880–1925), Swedish avant-garde artist and filmmaker
- Viking Gustafsson Nyberg (born 2003), Swedish ice hockey player
- Viking Palm (1923–2009), Swedish wrestler and 1952 Olympic champion
- Víkingur Kristjánsson (born 1972), Icelandic actor and screenwriter
- Víkingur Ólafsson (born 1984), Icelandic pianist

== See also ==
- Viking (nickname)
