= RFA Empire Gull =

1945 landing ship, tank of the Royal Fleet Auxiliary

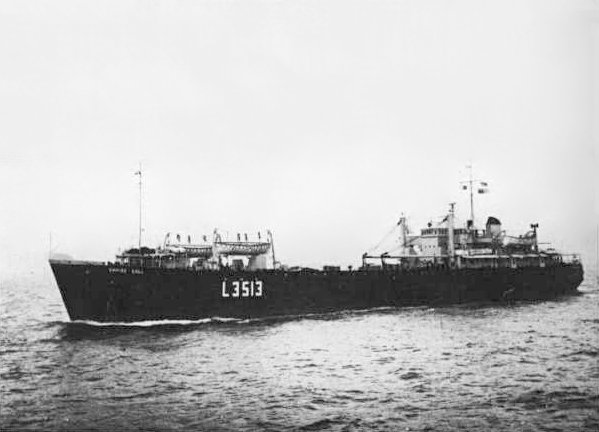
- Empire Gull (L3513)

History
- Name: LST 3523 (1944–47); HMS Trouncer (1947–56); SS Empire Gull (1956–70); RFA Empire Gull (1970–80)
- Operator: Royal Navy (1944–56); Atlantic Steam Navigation Company Ltd (1956-61); British-India Steam Navigation Company Ltd (1961-70); Royal Navy (1970–80)
- Port of registry: United Kingdom (1956–70)
- Ordered: 24 April 1944
- Builder: G.T. Davie Shipbuilding & Repairing Co Ltd., Lauzon, Quebec
- Yard number: 970
- Laid down: 20 December 1944
- Launched: 9 July 1945
- Commissioned: October 1945
- Decommissioned: 3 September 1978
- Identification: IMO number: 5103704
- Fate: Arrived Santander for demolition, 18 March 1980

General characteristics
- Type: Landing Ship, Tank
- Tonnage: 4,820 GRT
- Displacement: 4,980 long tons (5,060 t) full load
- Length: 347 ft 6 in (105.92 m)
- Beam: 55 ft 1 in (16.79 m)
- Draught: 12 ft 2.5 in (3.721 m)
- Propulsion: 2 × 4-cylinder triple expansion steam engines
- Speed: 10 knots (12 mph; 19 km/h)
- Complement: 63, plus accommodation for 80 troops

RFA Empire Gull (L3513) was a landing ship, tank of the Royal Fleet Auxiliary. She was familiarly known as the "Black Pig" and was one of the last serving British LSTs. She was built as LST 3523, one of the Empire Ships, and later commissioned as HMS Trouncer. During the Suez Crisis she was pressed into Government service as SS Empire Gull. In 1970 she was transferred to the Royal Fleet Auxiliary as RFA Empire Gull, serving for ten years before being scrapped.

== History ==
LST 3523 was built by Davie Shipbuilding and Repairing Co Ltd, Lauzon, Quebec, launched on 9 July 1945, and completed in October 1945. In 1947 she was commissioned as HMS Trouncer.

After spending some time mothballed on the River Clyde, she was pressed into service as SS Empire Gull during the Suez Crisis of 1956. She was operated under the management of the Atlantic Steam Navigation Company until 1961, when management passed to the British-India Steam Navigation Company. In 1970, she was transferred to the Royal Fleet Auxiliary and was renamed RFA Empire Gull, and allocated pennant number L3513. She served in the Mediterranean and later between Marchwood and Antwerp and also between Liverpool and Belfast. She was scrapped in Santander, Spain in 1980.
