= SS Empire Cedric =

World War II merchant ship of the United Kingdom

History
- Name: HMS LST 3534 (1946-48); SS Empire Cedric (1948-56); HMS Empire Cedric (1956); SS Empire Cedric (1956-60)
- Owner: Royal Navy (1946-48); Ministry of Transport (1948-56); Royal Navy (1956); Ministry of Transport (1956-60)
- Operator: Royal Navy (1946-48); Atlantic Steam Navigation Co Ltd (1948-56); Royal Navy (1956); Atlantic Steam Navigation Co Ltd (1956-60)
- Port of registry: (United Kingdom) Royal Navy (1946-48); (United Kingdom) London (1948-56); (United Kingdom) Royal Navy (1956); (United Kingdom) London (1956-60)
- Route: Tilbury - Hamburg (1946-48); Preston - Larne (1948-50); Preston - Larne or Belfast (1950-59)
- Builder: Yarrows Ltd., Esquimalt
- Launched: 23 June 1945
- Commissioned: 25 October 1945
- Out of service: 1959
- Fate: Scrapped 1960

General characteristics
- Class & type: Landing Ship, Tank (LST 3534); Ferry (Empire Cedric)
- Tonnage: 4,280 GRT (Empire Cedric); 3,056 DWT (Empire Cedric)
- Displacement: 2,256 tons (LST 3534)
- Length: 347 ft 6 in (105.92 m)
- Beam: 55 ft 3 in (16.84 m)
- Draught: 12 ft 5 in (3.78 m)
- Installed power: Triple expansion steam engine
- Propulsion: Screw propeller
- Speed: 13.5 knots (25.0 km/h)
- Capacity: 50 passengers (Empire Cedric)

Empire Cedric was the first ro-ro ferry. She was built for the Royal Navy as the Landing Ship, Tank, HMS LST 3534. She was commissioned in 1945 and converted for civilian use as a ferry in 1948. She was used in the Irish Sea on routes between Preston and Larne, and Preston and Belfast. In 1956, she was requisitioned by the Royal Navy for a few months during the Suez Crisis as HMS Empire Cedric. She served until 1960 when she was scrapped.

== Description ==
The ship was built Yarrows Ltd, Esquimalt, British Columbia. She was launched on 25 June 1945.

The ship was 347 feet 6 inches (105.92 m) long, with a beam of 55 feet 3 inches (16.84 m) and a draught of 12 feet 5 inches (3.78 m). She had a GRT of 4,820, and a DWT of 3,065. She was capable of 13.5 knots (25.0 km/h).

== History ==
LST 3534 was commissioned into the Royal Navy on 25 October 1945. She was chartered by the Atlantic Steam Navigation Company Ltd on 13 September 1946, and then converted to a ferry by Harland & Wolff Ltd, Tilbury.

Between 1946 and 1948, Empire Cedric was used on trooping duties between Tilbury and Hamburg, Germany. Empire Cedric entered service on 21 May 1948 on the Preston - Larne route, becoming the first commercial ro-ro ferry. She was certified to carry 50 passengers. Initially, there were two services per week. The service was so successful that an extra route between Preston and Belfast was opened in 1950, with services increasing to six or seven per week between the two routes. On 18 November 1949, Empire Cedric was involved in a collision with the coaster Topaz in fog in the Ribble Estuary. Empire Cedric appeared in a film made by Pathé News in 1949 about the delivery of prefabs from Gloucester to Northern Ireland.

In 1956, Empire Cedric took part in Operation Musketeer. She was used to transport member of 35 Field Squadron, Royal Engineers to Famagusta, Cyprus and also bring vehicles back to the United Kingdom from Egypt. Due to weather damage had to divert to Malta for repairs. In 1959, Empire Cedric was withdrawn from service. She was sold to a Belgian company on 12 August 1960 and arrived at Ghent for scrapping on 16 September.
