= SS Empire Celtic =

World War II merchant ship of the United Kingdom

History
- Name: HMS LST 3512 (1945); SS Empire Celtic (1945-56); HMS Empire Celtic (1956); SS Empire Celtic (1945-62)
- Owner: Royal Navy (1945); Ministry of War Transport (1945); Ministry of Transport (1945-62)
- Operator: Royal Navy (1945); Atlantic Steam Navigation Co Ltd (1946-56); Royal Navy (1956); Atlantic Steam Navigation Co Ltd (1956-60)
- Port of registry: (United Kingdom) Royal Navy (1946-48); (United Kingdom) London (1948-56); (United Kingdom) Royal Navy (1956); (United Kingdom) London (1956-60)
- Route: Tilbury - Hamburg (1946-55); Tilbury - Rotterdam (1955-60)
- Ordered: 1 February 1944
- Builder: Davie Shipbuilding, Lauzon
- Launched: 25 April 1945
- Completed: September 1945
- Commissioned: 7 August 1945
- Out of service: 1960
- Fate: Scrapped 1962

General characteristics
- Class & type: Landing Ship, Tank (LST 3514); Ferry (Empire Celtic)
- Length: 347 ft 6 in (105.92 m)
- Beam: 55 ft 3 in (16.84 m)
- Draught: 12 ft 5 in (3.78 m)
- Installed power: Triple expansion steam engine
- Propulsion: Screw propeller
- Speed: 13.5 knots (25.0 km/h)

Empire Celtic was a ferry which was built in 1945 as Landing Ship, Tank LST 3512 for the Royal Navy. In 1946 she was chartered by the Atlantic Steam Navigation Company Ltd, converted to a ferry and renamed Empire Celtic. In 1956, she was requisitioned by the Royal Navy for a few months during the Suez Crisis as HMS Empire Cedric. She served until 1960 and was scrapped in 1965.

== Description ==
The ship was ordered on 1 February 1944. She was built by Davie Shipbuilding & Repairing Co Ltd, Lauzon, Quebec, as yard number 335. She was launched on 25 April 1945, and completed in September.

The ship was 347 feet 6 inches (105.92 m) long, with a beam of 55 feet 3 inches (16.84 m) and a depth of 12 feet 5 inches (3.78 m).

The ship was propelled by a triple expansion steam engine. The engine was built by the Canadian Pacific Railway. It could propel her at 13.5 knots (25.0 km/h).

== History ==
LST 3512 was commissioned into the Royal Navy on 7 August 1945. In 1946, she was chartered by the Atlantic Steam Navigation Co Ltd. She was rebuilt as a ferry by Harland & Wolff Ltd, Tilbury. She entered service on trooping duties on the Tilbury - Hamburg route. I 1955, the route was changed to Tilbury - Rotterdam. In 1956, Empire Celtic took part in Operation Musketeer. She was used to bring vehicles back to the United Kingdom from Egypt. Due to weather damage Empire Celtic had to divert to Malta for repairs. Empire Celtic was withdrawn from service in 1960. She was sold on 10 August 1962, and scrapped at La Spezia, Italy.
