= Oil (band) =

Christian trash metal band

- Origin: Long Beach, California, U.S.
- Genres: Christian metal Thrash metal Groove metal
- Years active: 1997–2004 (on hiatus)
- Label: Kaluboné
- Past members: Blake Nelson; Ron Rinehart; Matthew Joy; Jason Vander Pal; Eric Wilkens; Jonathan Thiemens

Oil is a Christian thrash metal band from Norwalk, California, USA. The band was formed in 1997 by Blake Nelson, the former guitarist with Deceiver (band) Ron Rinehart , who converted to Christianity at a Harvest Crusade after Dark Angel's dissolution in 1992. Other members include lead guitarist Blake Nelson (formerly with Deceiver, Desire and Captain Black) and drummer Jason Vander Pal. Oil has released two studio albums and one live album.

In 2004, Rinehart left the band to pursue other non-musical interests. The remaining members started a new band, no shows are recordings were ever made.

== Biography ==
Oil's first release was a self-financed EP in 1999.

The Refine album was well-reviewed for its honest, no-frills metal approach. The band performed live gigs, including a show at the Stryper Expo, but Rinehart received an injury soon after the album release which meant Oil did not perform for nearly a year. Once recovered, Rinehart and Oil returned to performing, being announced as special guests to Disciple in April.

The band recorded the live album Choice Cuts Off the Chopping Block at the First Baptist Church in Downey, California, in November 2002 through Roxx Records. The record included two new acoustic songs, "This Is My Prayer" and "Medicine Man". When bass guitarist Matthew Joy opted out in May 2003, Oil recruited Jonathan Thiemens of Blind Sacrifices as a temporary replacement. This became permanent in July.

In July 2004, Oil announced that they were to disband. The group undertook one last show on August 14 alongside Recon, East West, Trauma and Terrestrial Harvest at The Lighthouse in Long Beach.

Blake Nelson of Oil is now in the band Blake Nelson's BLAKENSTEIN. Blakenstein's new album 13th Hour was to be released in early 2014.

== Members ==
Last Known Lineup

- Ron Rinehart - vocals (1997-2004)
- Blake Nelson - guitars (1997-2004)
- Jason Vander Pal - drums (1999-2004)
- Jonathan Thiemens - bass (2003-2003)

Former

- Matthew Joy - bass (1997-2003)
- Eric Wilkens - drums (1998-1999)

== Discography ==
=== Studio albums ===
- Oil (1997)
- Refine (2000)

=== Live albums ===
- Choice Cuts Off the Chopping Block (2003)

=== Compilations ===
- Temporary Insanity: A Salute to Deliverance (on tracks Attack and Screaming)

== Notes ==
- McGovern, Brian Vincent (July–August 1998). "Album Reviews: Oil". HM Magazine (72). Archived from the original on July 13, 2001.
- https://blabbermouth.net/news/oil-announce-new-bassist
