= HMS LST 3519 =

1945 LST(3)-class tank landing ship

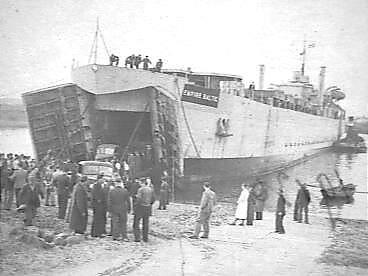
- As Empire Baltic in 1946

History

United Kingdom
- Name: HMS LST 3519; Empire Baltic
- Owner: Royal Navy (1945–46); Ministry of Transport (1946–62)
- Operator: Atlantic Steam Navigation Company (1946–1961); British-India Steam Navigation Company (1961–1962)
- Port of registry: Royal Navy (1945–46); (United Kingdom) UK (1946–62)
- Builder: Canadian Vickers Limited, Montreal, Quebec, Canada
- Launched: 26 April 1945
- Completed: September 1945
- Fate: Scrapped in 1962

General characteristics
- Class & type: Landing Ship, Tank (LST 3519); Ferry (Empire Baltic)
- Tonnage: 4,280 GRT (Empire Baltic)
- Displacement: 2,256 long tons (2,292 t) (LST 3519)
- Length: 347 ft (105.77 m)
- Beam: 55 ft 3 in (16.84 m)
- Depth: 12 ft 6 in (3.81 m)
- Propulsion: 8-cylinder triple-expansion steam engines, 2,750 hp (2,050 kW)
- Speed: 13.5 knots (25.0 km/h; 15.5 mph)
- Capacity: 62 passengers (Empire Baltic)
- Complement: 104 (LST 3519)
- Armament: 10 × 20 mm AA guns (LST 3519)

HMS LST 3519 was a Landing Ship, Tank of the Royal Navy, entering service during the last months of the Second World War. She was chartered for civilian service as the Empire Baltic from 1946, serving as an early RO-RO ferry until the navy suspended the charter and requisitioned the ship during the Suez Crisis in 1956. She briefly returned to normal service, but was retired soon after and was eventually sold for breaking up.

== Career ==
LST 3519 was built in the Montreal yards of the Canadian subsidiary of Vickers, Canadian Vickers Limited. She was launched on 26 April 1945 and completed in September 1945. After the end of the war she was one of three LSTs chartered by the Government to the firm of F.Bustard & Sons Ltd., who employed the ships in his Atlantic Steam Navigation Company. She was converted to civilian use by Harland & Wolf Ltd, Tilbury. A new bridge was built and accommodation was provided for 50 lorry drivers and 12 passengers. The renamed Empire Baltic made the first voyage of the new company, sailing from Tilbury Docks to Rotterdam on 11 September 1946. The journey took 24 hours The ship spent the next decade conveying army vehicles and personnel across the English Channel. On 24 September 1949, Empire Baltic hit a mine off Borkum, West Germany. Tugs from Borkum and Cuxhaven went to her assistance. The outbreak of the Suez Crisis in 1956 led to her being requisitioned along with the other LSTs operating under Admiralty charter, and Empire Baltic was used to carry Centurion tanks to Alexandria. In August 1958, Empire Baltic was involved in a collision with SS Orontes in the River Thames.

She returned to operate for the Atlantic Steam Navigation Company after the end of the conflict, but was withdrawn from service in 1959. She appears to have been briefly operated by the British-India Steam Navigation Company in 1961. Empire Baltic and Empire Curlew were advertised for sale in April 1962 as lying at Malta. Empire Baltic arrived at La Spezia, Italy for breaking up on 10 July 1962.
