= SS Empire Curlew (1945) =

1945 tank landing ship later converted to a civilian ferry

History
- Name: HMS LST 3042 (1945-47); HMS Hunter (1947-56); SS Empire Curlew (1956-62)
- Owner: Royal Navy (1945-56); Ministry of Transport (1956-62)
- Operator: Royal Navy (1945-56); Atlantic Steam Navigation Company Ltd (1956-61); British India Steam Navigation Co Ltd (1961-62)
- Port of registry: (United Kingdom) Royal Navy (1945-56); United Kingdom (1956-62)
- Builder: Harland & Wolff Ltd
- Yard number: 1298
- Launched: 31 January 1945
- Completed: November 1945
- Commissioned: 16 November 1945
- Out of service: 1962
- Fate: Scrapped in 1962

General characteristics
- Class & type: Landing Ship, Tank
- Tonnage: 4,273 GRT; 2,296 NRT
- Length: 347 ft 6 in (105.92 m)
- Beam: 55 ft 1 in (16.79 m)
- Draught: 12 feet 2 1/2 inches (3.721 m) (summer)
- Depth: 27 ft 1 in (8.26 m)
- Propulsion: Triple expansion steam engine
- Speed: 13 knots (24 km/h)
- Capacity: 90 troops (HMS LST 3042, HMS Hunter)
- Complement: 14 (HMS LST 3042, HMS Hunter)
- Armament: 8 x 20mm AA guns

Empire Curlew was a 4,273 GRT ferry that was built in 1945 as LST Mk.3 HMS LST 3042 by Harland & Wolff, Govan, Scotland for the Royal Navy. In 1947, she was renamed HMS Hunter. During the Suez Crisis in 1956, she was transferred to the Ministry of Transport and renamed Empire Curlew. She served until 1962 when she was scrapped.

== Description ==
The ship was built in 1945 by Harland & Wolff, Govan. She was Yard Number 1298,

The ship was 347 feet 6 inches (105.92 m) long, with a beam of 55 feet 1 inch (16.79 m). She had a depth of 27 feet 1 inch (8.26 m) and a summer draught of 12 feet 2 1/2 inches (3.721 m). She was assessed at 4,273 GRT, 2,296 NRT.

The ship was propelled by a triple expansion-steam engine. The engine was built by Lobnitz, Renfrew. It drove twin screw propellers and could propel the ship at 13 knots (24 km/h).

In Royal Navy service, the ship had a complement of 14 and a capacity for 90 troops. The armament was 8 x 20mm AA guns.

== History ==
HMS LST 3042 was launched on 31 January 1945, and completed in November 1945. She was commissioned on 16 November 1945. In 1947, she was renamed HMS Hunter. Hunter was later laid up on the River Clyde.

In 1956, during the Suez Crisis, she was requisitioned by the Ministry of Transport and renamed Empire Curlew. She was converted by John Brown & Company at their Dalmuir yard. She was placed under the management of the Atlantic Steam Navigation Company. In 1962, management was transferred to the British-India Steam Navigation Co Ltd. In April 1962, Empire Curlew was advertised for sale as lying in Malta, along with Empire Baltic. She arrived on 20 August 1962 at La Spezia, Italy for scrapping.
