= SS Empire Gaelic =

World War II merchant ship of the United Kingdom

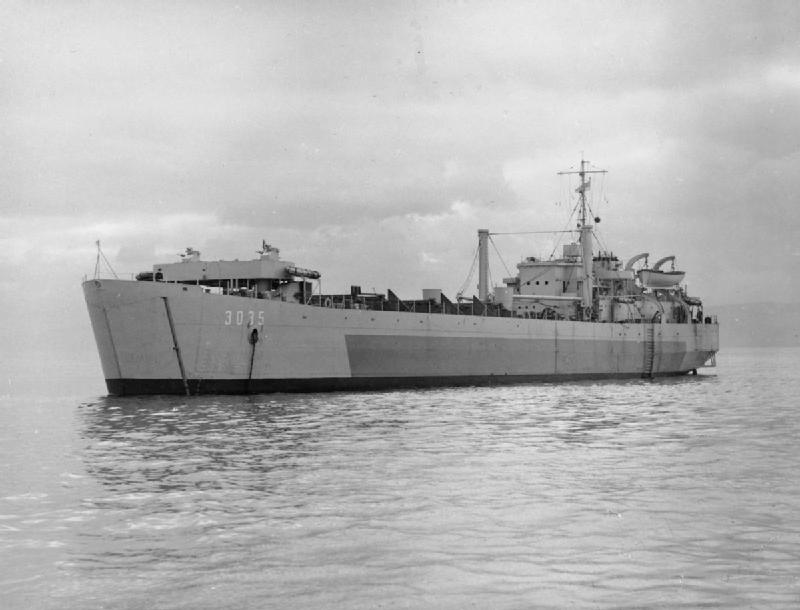
- HMS LST 3035, a LST Mk.3

History
- Name: LST 3507 (1944–48); Empire Gaelic (1948–60)
- Owner: Admiralty (1944–48); Atlantic Steam Navigation Co (1948–60)
- Operator: Royal Navy (1945–48); Atlantic Steam Navigation Co (1948–60)
- Port of registry: Royal Navy (1945–48); London, United Kingdom (1948-60)
- Ordered: 1 February 1944
- Builder: Davie Shipbuilding, Lauzon
- Yard number: 562
- Launched: 28 October 1944
- Commissioned: 14 May 1945
- Out of service: 1960
- Identification: Code Letters MAVR
- Fate: Scrapped 1960

General characteristics
- Class & type: Landing Ship, Tank (1945–48); Ferry (1948–60)
- Tonnage: 4,840 gross register tons (GRT) (1945–48), 4,291 GRT (1948–60) 2,325 net register tons (NRT) (1948–60), 1,970 tons deadweight (DWT) (1948–60)
- Length: 345 ft 2 in (105.21 m)
- Beam: 54 ft 2 in (16.51 m)
- Draught: 10 ft 6 in (3.20 m)
- Installed power: Triple expansion steam engine
- Propulsion: Twin screw propellers
- Speed: 10 knots (19 km/h)

Empire Gaelic was a ferry which was built in 1945 for the Royal Navy as the Landing Ship Tank, Mk.3 HMS LST 3507. She was converted into a ferry in 1948 and renamed Empire Gaelic, serving on the Preston – Larne route 1949–60, when she was scrapped.

== Description ==
The ship was 345 ft 2 in (105.21 m) long overall, with a beam of 54 ft 2 in (16.51 m).a draught of 10 ft 7 in (3.23 m). She was assessed at 4,840 GRT.

The ship was propelled by a triple expansion steam engine. The engine was built by the Canadian Pacific Railway, Montreal, Quebec, Canada. It drove twin screw propellers. The engine could propel the ship at a speed of 10 knots (19 km/h).

== History ==
Landing Ship Tank, Mk.3 HMS LST 3507 was built in 1944 as yard number 562 by Davie Shipbuilding and Repairing Co. Ltd. Lauzon, Quebec for the Royal Navy. Ordered on 1 February 1944, she was launched on 28 October and commissioned on 15 May 1945. The Code Letters MAVR were allocated.

In 1948, LST 3507 was sold to the Atlantic Steam Navigation Company and converted to a ferry by Harland & Wolff, Govan. Following the rebuild, she was assessed at 4,291 DWT, 2,325 NRT, 1,970 DWT. She entered service in January 1949 on the Preston – Larne route.

Empire Gaelic had been withdrawn from service by May 1960 and laid up in the Holy Loch, where she was offered for sale. She was scrapped in September in Burcht, Antwerp, Belgium.
