= HMS LST 3041 =

1944 LST(3)-class tank landing ship

- LST 3041 entering harbour in Malta

History
- Name: LST 3041 (1944–48); Empire Doric (1948–56); LST 3041 (1956–60)
- Owner: Royal Navy (1944–48); Ministry of Transport (1948–60)
- Operator: Royal Navy (1944–48); Atlantic Steam Navigation Company (1948–56); Royal Navy (1956–60)
- Port of registry: (United Kingdom) Royal Navy (1944–48); London, United Kingdom (1948–56); (United Kingdom) Royal Navy (1956–60)
- Route: Preston–Larne (1948–56)
- Builder: Harland and Wolff, Govan
- Yard number: 1297
- Launched: 31 October 1944
- Commissioned: 1944–48, 1956–60
- Decommissioned: 1948–56
- Fate: Scrapped 1960

General characteristics
- Type: Landing Ship, Tank
- Tonnage: 2,256 GRT
- Displacement: 4,223 long tons (4,291 t)
- Length: 345 ft (105 m)
- Beam: 54 ft (16 m)
- Draught: 12 ft 5 in (3.78 m)
- Propulsion: Steam engine

LST 3041 was a Landing Ship, Tank that served in the Royal Navy at the end of World War II, before being converted to a commercial ferry. She was later requisitioned by the Navy during the Suez Crisis, and was scrapped in 1960.

== Description ==
The ship was 345 feet (105 m) long, with a beam of 54 feet (16 m). She had a draught of 12 feet 5 inches (3.78 m) and was assessed at 2,256 GRT.

== History ==
LST 3041 was built by Harland and Wolff at their Govan shipyard (yard number 1267) and was launched on 31 October 1944.

The crew joined her in Scotland and took part in shakedown trials in which they would run the ship ashore and use the stern anchor to pull themselves off.

=== World War II ===
In the summer of 1945, LMS 3041 sailed to the Suez Canal carrying tanks, troops, and a troop landing craft. After unloading there, she transited the Canal and headed towards Japan to support the Allied invasion efforts. She was also used to transport rice from Thailand to Singapore. During this time, she made a port call at Bombay (now Mumbai) where she engaged in a tug-of-war with a tugboat, surprisingly emerging victorious and capsizing the tug.

After returning through the Suez, she was refitted, and the rivets in the bottom of the hull that had been worn by repeated landings were replaced in drydock. She finally returned to England in 1947 via Malta and Gibraltar.

=== Commercial ferry ===
In 1948, she was chartered to F. Bustard & Sons, the Atlantic Steam Navigation Company and was renamed Empire Doric. Her port of registry was London. The LSTs became one of the forerunners of the modern roll on-roll off (RO-RO) car ferries. She was placed into service on the Preston – Larne route. ASN was nationalized under the British Transport Commission in 1954.

=== Suez ===
During the Suez Crisis, the ship was requisitioned by the Royal Navy and renamed LST 3041. She sailed to Port Said where she offloaded Centurion tanks, and where she struck a sunken vessel. As a result of this collision, she had to call in at Naples on the way home for repairs and was in drydock until early January 1957. She remained in use until 1960. LST 3041 arrived on 13 January 1960 at Glasgow for scrapping by Smith, Houston & Co Ltd, Port Glasgow.
