= SS Empire Cymric =

World War II merchant ship of the United Kingdom

History
- Name: HMS LST 3010 (1944-45); HNLMS LST 3010 (1945-47); HMS Attacker (1947-54); Empire Cymric (1954-56); HMS Empire Cymric (1956); Empire Cymric (1956-63)
- Owner: Royal Navy (1944-45); Koninklijke Marine (1945-47); Royal Navy (1947-54); Atlantic Steam Navigation Co Ltd (1954-63)
- Operator: Royal Navy (1944-45); Koninklijke Marine (1945-47); Royal Navy (1947); Ministry of Transport (1947-55); Atlantic Steam Navigation Co Ltd (1955-63)
- Port of registry: (United Kingdom) Royal Navy (1944-45); (Netherlands) Koninklijke Marine (1945-47); (United Kingdom) Royal Navy (1947-54); United Kingdom (1954-56); (United Kingdom) Royal Navy (1956); United Kingdom (1956-63)
- Builder: Harland & Wolff Ltd
- Launched: 30 September 1944
- Commissioned: 5 April 1945
- Fate: Scrapped in 1963

General characteristics
- Class & type: LST (3) (1944-54); Ferry (1954-63)
- Tonnage: 4,820 GRT
- Length: 347 ft 5 in (105.89 m)
- Beam: 55 ft 3 in (16.84 m)
- Draught: 12 ft 0 in (3.66 m)
- Propulsion: Triple expansion steam engine
- Speed: 13 knots (24 km/h)
- Armament: 8 x 20mm AA guns

Empire Cymric was a 4,820 GRT Ferry that was built in 1944 by Harland & Wolff Ltd, Belfast as LST (3) HMS LST 3010 for the Royal Navy. She was transferred to the Koninklijke Marine in 1945, serving as HNLMS LST 3010. In 1947, she was transferred back to the Royal Navy and renamed HMS Attacker. The ship was requisitioned by the Ministry of Transport in 1954 and renamed Empire Cymric. Requisitioned briefly during the Suez Crisis in 1956 as HMS Empire Cymric, she served until 1962, and was scrapped in 1963.

== Description ==
The ship was built in 1944 by Harland & Wolff Ltd, Belfast.

The ship was 347 feet 5 inches (105.89 m) long, with a beam of 55 feet 3 inches (16.84 m).She had a draught of 12 feet 0 inches (3.66 m). She was assessed at 4,820 GRT,

The ship was propelled by a 5,500 ihp triple expansion steam engine which was supplied by two 3-drum boilers. It drove twin screw propellers and could propel the ship at 13 knots (24 km/h).

In Royal Navy service, armament was 8 x 20mm AA guns.

== History ==
LST 3010 was launched on 30 September 1944. She was commissioned into the Royal Navy on 5 April 1945.

LST 3010 was transferred to the Koninklijke Marine in 1945. In February and March 1946, LST 3010 was in service in Java, Dutch East Indies, where a war of independence was taking place. In 1947, she was returned to the Royal Navy and was renamed Attacker. She was chartered by the Ministry of Transport and converted to a ferry. In 1955, she was sold to the Atlantic Steam Navigation Company and renamed Empire Cymric. Operated on the Preston, Lancashire - Belfast, Northern Ireland route, Empire Cymric was requisitioned by the Royal Navy for use during the Suez Crisis. She was escorted from Malta to Port Said, Egypt by HMS Forth, which escorted her back to Malta after the crisis was over. She served until 1963, arriving on 1 October at Faslane, Dunbartonshire for scrapping.
