= Los Vikings =

Salvadoran rock band

- Also known as: Los Vikings de Usulután
- Origin: Usulután, El Salvador
- Genres: Rock; Garage rock Rock en Español; Nueva Ola
- Years active: 1965-1973; 2002-Present
- Label: Dimsa
- Members: Remberto Trejo (lead vocals); Gustavo Llarreinaga (drums); Juan López Gonzáles (organ); Victor Moreno (bass); Payín Moreno (lead guitar); Armando Martínez (rhythm guitar, background vocals)

Los Vikings (also known as Los Vikings de Usulután) are a rock group from Usulután, El Salvador, formed in the 1960s, and are often cited as the exemplary group of the "golden age of Salvadoran rock". Members included Remberto Trejo (lead singer), Gustavo Larreinaga (drums), Juan López Gonzáles (organ), Víctor Moreno (bass) Payín Moreno (lead guitar), and Armando Martínez (rhythm guitar, background vocals). Group hits include, "Tu Crees En Mi", "Y En Cambio Tu", and "Cien Mujeres". After much success during the Latin American Nueva Ola scene, the group became inactive in 1973. Los Vikings reunited in 2002 for at least one show.

During their career they wrote 50 songs and recorded 3 Long Plays, of these, the first album "Vikings" obtained a resounding success both at home and in Mexico and the United States. Among the songs that made them famous include: "Sentado en la verja del camino", "Y en cambio tú", "Melodía para ti", "Cien mujeres", and many more.

After 40 years, their music still sounds in some radio stations in Mexico, Australia and The United States, and of course in El Salvador.

The group separated to pursue their individual careers in other countries.

== Reunion ==
Vikings reformed after 40 years to participate in the Fiestas Patronales of the city, Usulután. Their reunion concert was held at a public park in Usulutan on Friday November 23, 2012.

== Discography ==
- 19?? – La Inmensidad (DIC-1004)
- 1969 – Los Vikings (DIC/S-1022)
- 19?? – Viking's (DIC/S-1063)
