= We Have Arrived =

Studio album by Dark Angel
- Released: March 1985
- Recorded: August 1984
- Studios: Track Record Studios, Hollywood, California
- Genre: Thrash metal
- Length: 33:33
- Label: Azra/Metal Storm
- Producers: Dark Angel, Vadim Rubin, Mike Siegel

Dark Angel chronology
We Have Arrived (1985)	Darkness Descends (1986)

Axe Killer re-release cover

We Have Arrived is the debut studio album by American thrash metal band Dark Angel, released in March 1985. It is the only Dark Angel album to feature Jack Schwartz on drums, as Gene Hoglan replaced him as their drummer on subsequent albums.

== Background ==
We Have Arrived has been reissued at least two times. In 1986, it was re-released by the French recording label Axe Killer in a 2,000 number limited edition. It was then re-released once again in 1997 by Axe Killer. The label attached to the plastic wrap says that this is a remastered edition, but there is no indication of it in the booklet.

One of the songs from this album, "Merciless Death", was re-recorded for their next album Darkness Descends.

The album's sound has been described as "amateurish" and its tracks as "uncultivated noise fests" lacking "technical discipline".

== Reception and legacy ==
Professional ratings
Review scores
Source	Rating
AllMusic	1.5/5 stars
Collector's Guide to Heavy Metal	5/10

The album was met with mixed reactions. Reviewer Eduardo Rivadavia of AllMusic gave the album a 1.5 of 5 saying "Dark Angel's arrogantly titled debut We Have Arrived is as primitive as it gets" and that it "will only interest serious thrash enthusiasts." Canadian journalist Martin Popoff compared the music on the album to the German thrash school and to early Slayer-style; he found sonic affinity with Death, but "loud, fast and crude in comparison".

Dark Angel drummer Gene Hoglan has discredited the album, namely Don Doty's vocal performance. He said, "To be honest, I felt that the vocals on We Have Arrived were horrible — just bland and boring and it sounded like Don was singing through his nose. So I had no problem not having that voice in the band anymore [after Doty had left], and it gave us a shot to get somebody powerful."

== Track listing ==
Side One
No.	Title	Length
1.	"We Have Arrived"	4:07
2.	"Merciless Death"	4:28
3.	"Falling from the Sky"	4:23
4.	"Welcome to the Slaughter House"	5:23

Side Two
No.	Title	Length
5.	"No Tomorrow"	6:31
6.	"Hell's on Its Knees"	4:14
7.	"Vendetta"	4:27

== Personnel ==
Dark Angel

- Don Doty – vocals
- Eric Meyer – guitar
- Jim Durkin – guitar
- Rob Yahn – bass
- Jack Schwartz – drums

Production

- Bill Metoyer – engineering
- Vadim Rubin, Mike Siegal – executive production
