= Viking (band) =

American thrash metal band

- Origin: Los Angeles, California, U.S.
- Genres: Thrash metal
- Years active: 1986–1990, 2011–present
- Labels: Metal Blade
- Members: Ron Eriksen; Mike Gonzalez; Matt Jordan; Justin Zych
- Past members: James Lareau; Brett Eriksen; Gene Hoglan; Glenn Rogers
- Website: vikingthrashmetal.com

Viking is an American thrash metal band from Los Angeles, California. The band was originally active between 1986 and 1990 before reforming in 2011. To date, Viking has released three studio albums, Do or Die (1988), Man of Straw (1989) and No Child Left Behind (2015).

== History ==
=== Initial career and breakup (1986–1990) ===
Viking was formed in Los Angeles in the spring of 1986 and held the same personnel until they broke up in 1990. The band signed a record contract with Metal Blade Records after their second live appearance and went on to record two full-length albums and open up for bands like Dark Angel, Megadeth, Forbidden and Sacred Reich as well as headlining many other shows.

In 1988, they released their debut album Do or Die. It was not well received by the critics.

Their follow-up to Do or Die saw a change in songwriting and musicianship. The songs on 1989's Man of Straw included half-time mosh bridges and more technical riffs.

Shortly before they started to record Man of Straw, Ron Eriksen became a born-again Christian and changed some of the lyrics to avoid blasphemies. Before embarking on a tour with Texas-based Helstar in 1990, Ron felt that his new faith could not endure the tour, and he left the band, which immediately broke up upon his departure. Prior to their breakup, Viking demoed new material for their third album for a 1990 release, and one song, "Abortuary", was released as a bonus track on the 2006 reissue of Man of Straw.

=== Post-breakup (1991–2010) ===
Ron and drummer Matt Jordan soon after moved to Oregon, Brett Eriksen joined Dark Angel full-time and bassist James Lareau pursued a career in sculpture.

Before Viking, Ron (whose stage name Ronny Devious had been carried over from his days with Hags), Matt, and James were in Tracer and released a 3-song demo entitled Sudden Death with vocalist Tony Vargas (Vermin/ex-L.S.N.). Following a temporary split, Brett began jamming with the band, and Ron began singing.

After the release of Man of Straw, Matt Jordan also converted to Christianity. Ron has said that Matt's conversion had nothing to do with his own. Some years after the band broke up, Ron became a Bible teacher.

=== Reunion (2011–present) ===
In early 2011, Ron Eriksen (guitar, vocals) resurrected Viking after a 20-year hiatus.

Ron recruited Dark Angel members Gene Hoglan and Mike Gonzalez and Justin Zych (Valhalla, Zephaniah, ex-Vindicator) to record Viking's first release in over 20 years titled, No Child Left Behind.

In 2013, Viking played its first shows in over 20 years with the addition of Matt Jordan (ex-Barrier, ex-Lethal Gene) on drums. They headlined the Childhood Hero's Festival in New York City and Ragnarokkr in Chicago.

No Child Left Behind was released on March 4, 2015. Although Viking has not officially announced a hiatus or disbandment, inactivity on the band has resumed since the release of No Child Left Behind.

== Members ==
Current members

- Ron Eriksen – guitars, vocals (1986–1990, 2011–present)
- Mike Gonzalez – bass (2011–present)
- Matt Jordan – drums (1986–1990, 2013–present)
- Justin Zych – guitars (2013–present)

Former members

- James Lareau – bass (1986–1990)
- Brett Eriksen – guitars (1986–1990)
- Gene Hoglan – drums (2011–2013)
- Glenn Rogers – guitars (2011)

== Discography ==
=== Studio albums ===
- Do or Die (Metal Blade, 1988)
- Man of Straw (Metal Blade, 1989; reissued by Lost and Found in 2006)
- No Child Left Behind (Independent, 2015)

=== Compilation appearances ===
- "Hellbound" on Metal Massacre VIII (Metal Blade, 1987)
- "Warlord" on The Best of Metal Blade, Volume 3 (Metal Blade, 1988)
- "Do or Die" on Metallic Overdrive (Metal Blade, 1990)
