= MS Viking I =

Car and passenger ferry

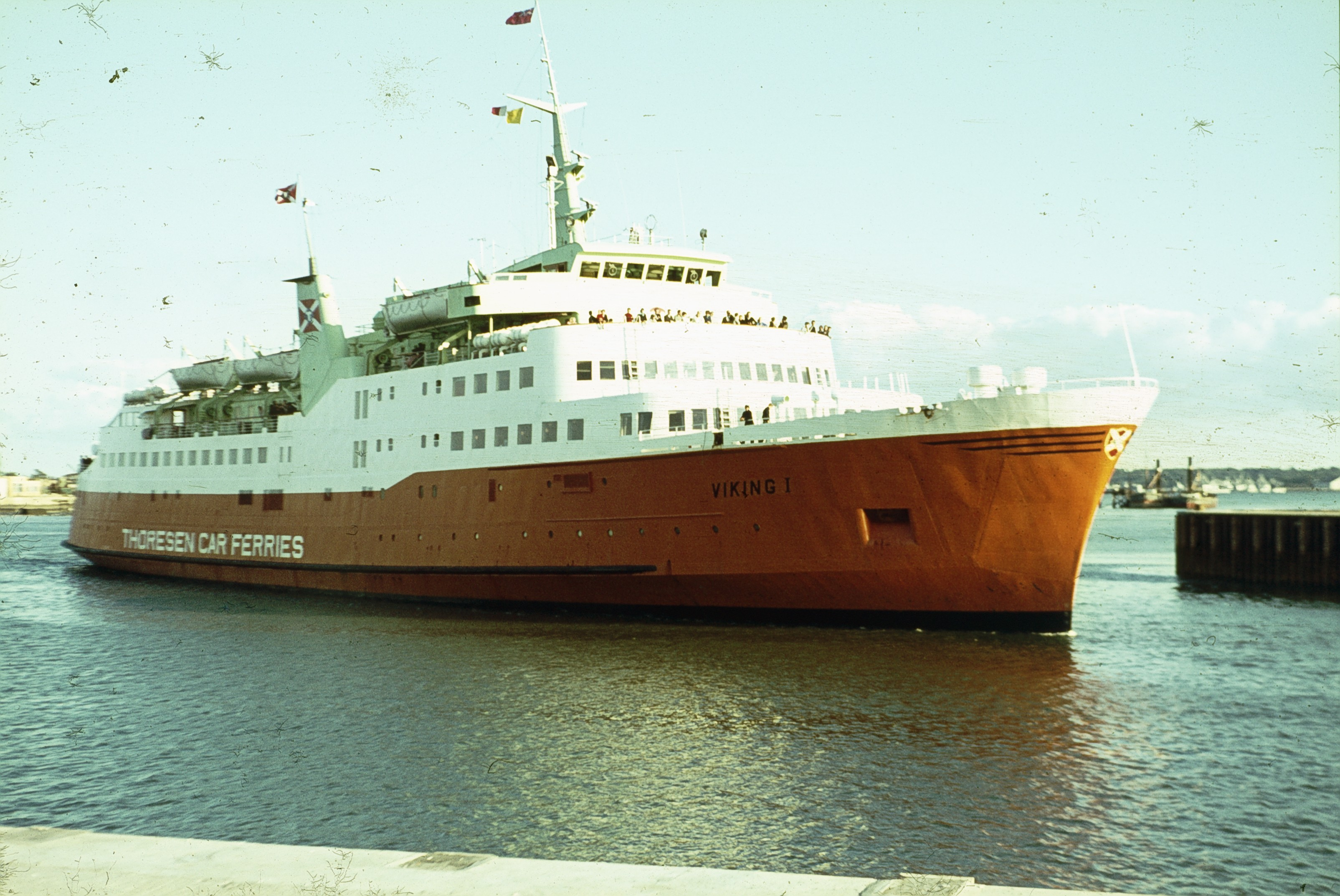
- Viking I in Dover's Eastern Docks, 1967

History
- Name: Viking I; Viking Victory; Neptunia; Media II; Media V; Edi
- Owner: Ionian Sky Ferry, (2007–2008)
- Operator: Ionian Sky Ferry (2007–2008)
- Port of registry: Limassol, Cyprus (until 2008)
- Route: Initially, service between Southampton and Cherbourg
- Builder: Kaldnes Mekaniske Verksted A/S, Tønsberg, Norway
- Launched: 31 January 1964
- Completed: 1964
- Maiden voyage: 11 May 1964
- In service: 1964
- Out of service: 2008
- Identification: IMO number: 6407652
- Fate: Scrapped in 2008

General characteristics
- Type: RORO car and passenger ferry
- Tonnage: 5,440 GRT
- Length: 99.5 m (326 ft 5 in)
- Beam: 23.19 m (76 ft 1 in)
- Draught: 4.42 m (14 ft 6 in)
- Propulsion: 2 × Pielstick Lindholmens 12 PC2V 400
- Speed: 18.5 knots (34.3 km/h; 21.3 mph)
- Capacity: 940 passengers, 180 cars

MS Viking I was a roll-on/roll-off car and passenger ferry and was last owned by Ionian Sky Ferry before being scrapped in 2008. She originally entered service with Otto Thoresen of Thoresen Ferries for service between Southampton and Cherbourg across the English Channel.

== Revolutionary design ==
Viking I was designed by naval architect Tage Wandborg in the early 1960s. She was a drive-through car ferry and was a significant and revolutionary design, being one of the first of her kind to operate from the UK across the Western English channel. Viking I was in operation on the Southampton to Cherbourg and Le Havre routes from 1964 for Otto Thoresen's Thoresen Ferries.
