= Eric Meyer (musician) =

American musician (born 1964)

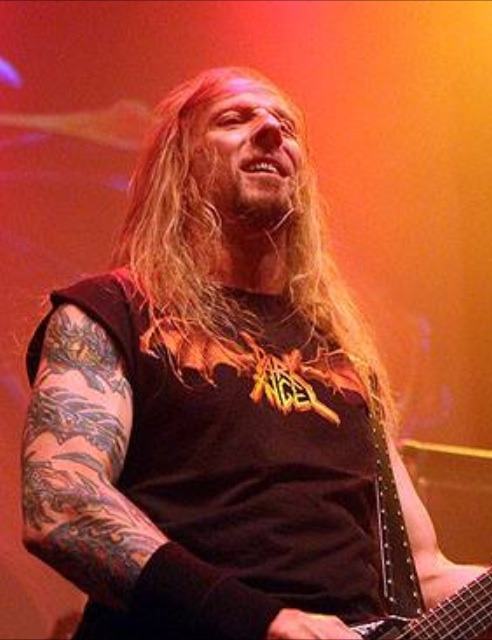
- Meyer performing with Dark Angel in 2014

Background information
- Born: Eric Meyer; March 31, 1964 (age 62)
- Genres: Thrash metal, groove metal
- Occupations: Musician, engineer, producer
- Instrument: Guitar
- Years active: 1983-present

Eric Meyer (born March 31, 1964) is an American musician who is best known as the lead guitarist for the Los Angeles based thrash metal band Dark Angel, which he joined in 1984, and played on all of their albums from We Have Arrived onwards.

Following the breakup of Dark Angel he worked as a producer, including on albums by Transmetal.
