= List of Devin Townsend's bands members =

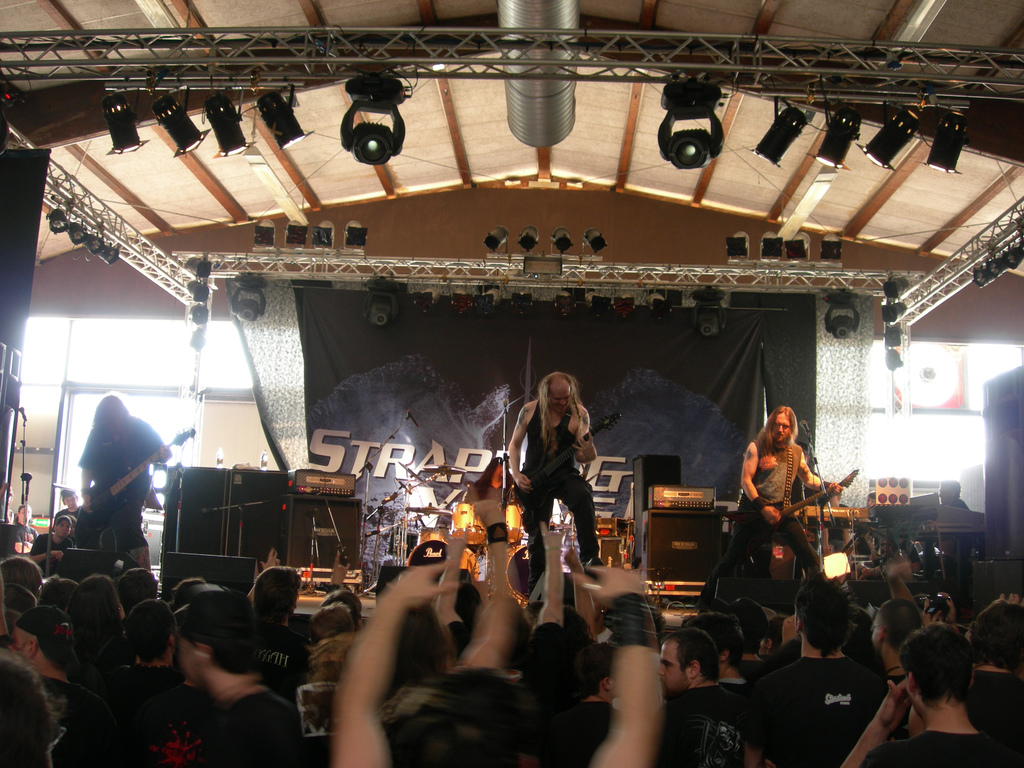
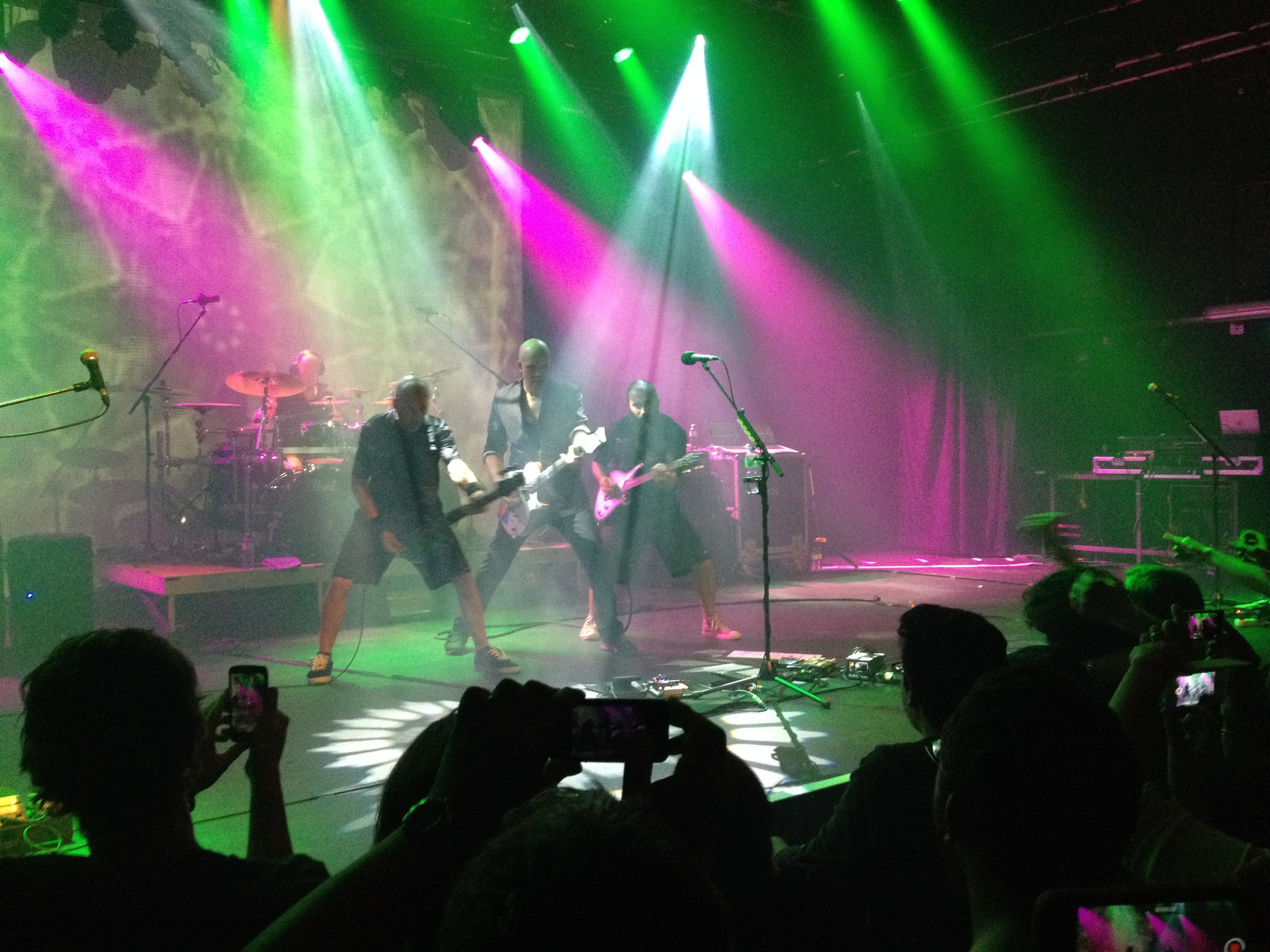
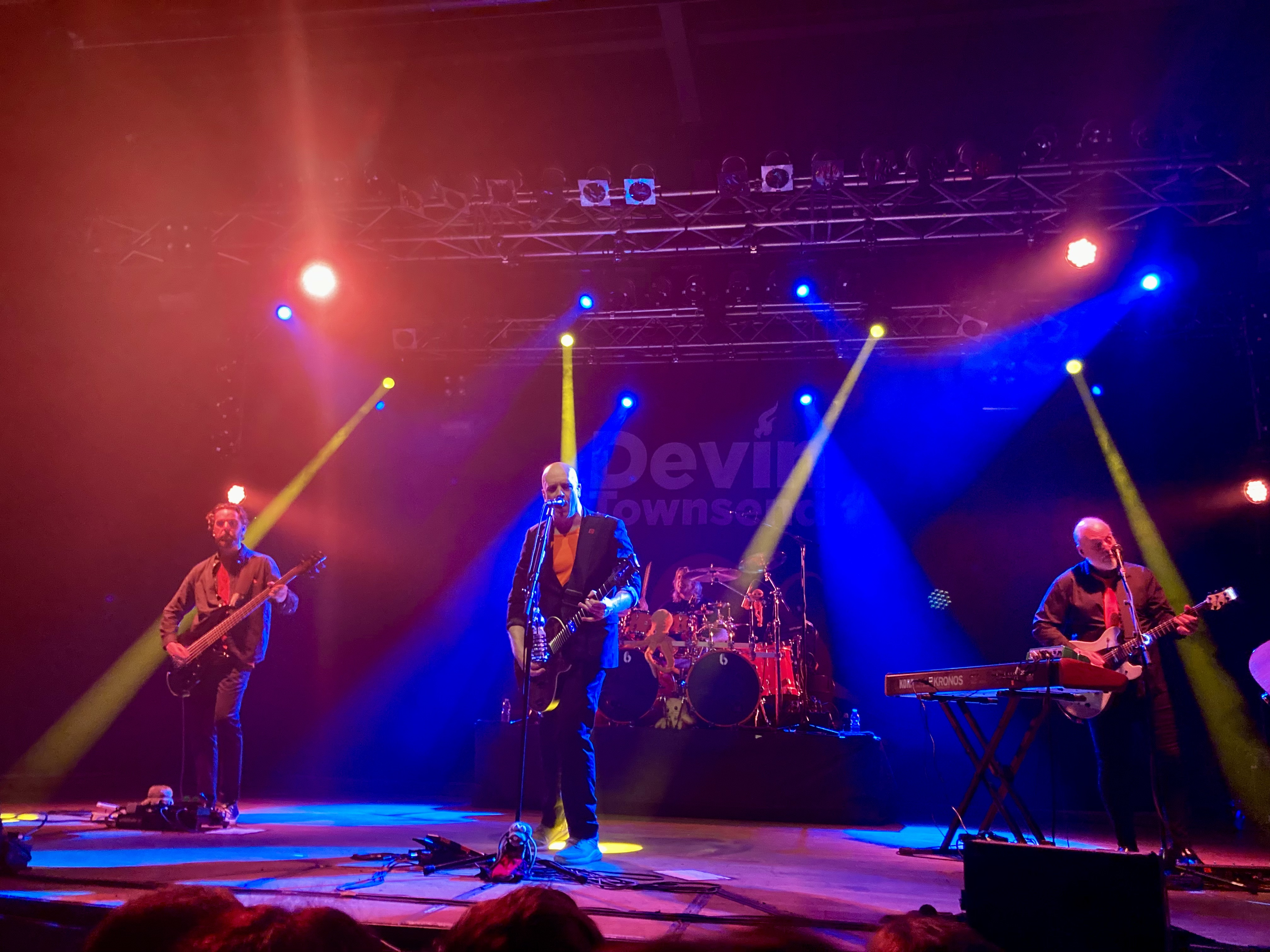
Strapping Young Lad in 2006, Devin Townsend Project in 2014 and Devin Townsend in 2023

Devin Townsend is a Canadian musician. Having released a total of 28 albums, Townsend began singing lead vocals on Steve Vai's Sex & Religion album and tour in 1993, while also playing guitar on The Wildhearts 1994 European tour. He currently tours under his own name with guitarist and keyboardist Mike Keneally (who first joined in 2019), bassist James Leach and drummer Darby Todd (both since 2021).

== History ==
While touring with The Wildhearts, he co-founded a short lived thrash metal trio with Jason Newsted (Metallica) on vocals and bass, Townsend on guitar, and Tom Hunting (Exodus) on drums. The trio recorded a couple of songs and then disbanded. He also provided much of the guitar work on the 1994 album Millennium and the 1995 album Hard Wired by Vancouver industrial band Front Line Assembly.

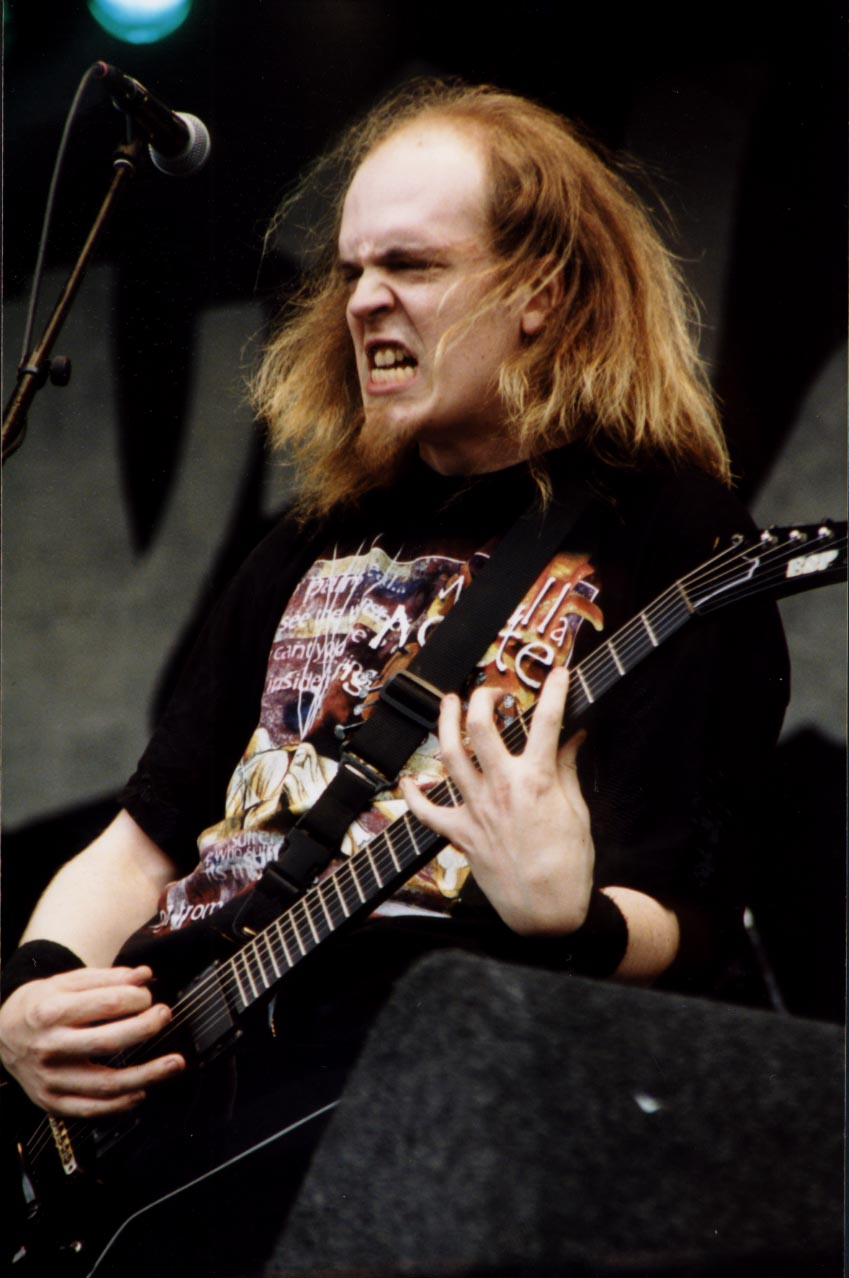
Townsend performing in 2005.

Townsend began to record material under the pseudonym Strapping Young Lad (SYL), he produced and performed nearly all the instruments on the debut studio album, Heavy as a Really Heavy Thing, which was released in April 1995. Townsend assembled a permanent lineup of Strapping Young Lad to record City, including prolific metal drummer Gene Hoglan (Dark Angel, Death, Testament), along with Townsend's former bandmates Jed Simon on guitar and Byron Stroud on bass.

After releasing two albums with SYL, and four solo albums, he formed The Devin Townsend Band, which consisted of Brian "Beav" Waddell on guitar, Mike Young on bass, Ryan Van Poederooyen on drums, and Dave Young on keyboards, all of whom contributed to Accelerated Evolution. Both SYL and the DTB disbanded in 2006 when Townsend withdrew from touring to spend time with his family.

In 2009, Townsend started the Devin Townsend Project as a four-album series. After releasing Ki and Addicted in 2009, he returned to the stage in January 2010 with a band including Young on guitar and keyboards, Waddell on bass, Van Poederooyen on drums and Anneke van Giersbergen on female vocals. The DTP continued until 2018, at which point it consisted of Young, Waddell, Van Poederooven and keyboardist Mike St-Jean.

While the DTP for active, Townsend had a side project with singer Ché Aimee Dorval and drummer Morgan Ågren, under the name Casualties of Cool who have released one self titled album to date.

Townsend toured under his own name for the first time in 2019; the line-up included Mike Keneally (guitar, keyboards), Morgan Agren (drums), Nathan Navarro (bass), Che Aimee Dorval (guitars, vocals), Diego Tejeida (keyboards) and Markus Reuter (touch guitar). He played the 70000 Tons of Metal cruise in January 2020, with guitarist Wes Hauch (ex-The Faceless, Black Crown Initiate), bassist Kyle Konkiel (Bad Wolves), and drummer Dirk Verbeuren (Megadeth, ex-Soilwork).

In early 2020 he was joined by guitarist Hauch, bassist Liam Wilson (The Dillinger Escape Plan) and drummer Kerim Lechner (Decapitated, Septicflesh), however most shows were cancelled due to the COVID-19 pandemic. Later in the year Townsend played a virtual concert with Hauch, Wilson and drummer Samus Paulicelli. He headlined Bloodstock Open Air in 2021 with drummer Darby Todd, bassist James Leach and guitarist Stephen Platt. The same musicians also played with Townsend in 2022. Keneally returned to replace Platt for Townsends 2023 tour.

== Members ==
=== Members of current touring band ===
| Image | Name | Years active | Band(s) | Instruments | Release contributions |
|---|---|---|---|---|---|
| | Devin Townsend | 1994–present | All | guitars; lead vocals; keyboards; theremin; bass | all releases |
| | Mike Keneally | 2019–2020; 2023–present | Solo | guitars; keyboards; backing vocals | Empath (2019); The Puzzle (2021); Lightwork (2022); Empath: Live in America (2023); PowerNerd (2024); "The Moth" (2026) |
| | James Leach | 2021–present | Solo | bass | "The Moth" (2026) |
| | Darby Todd | 2021–present | Solo | drums | Lightwork (2022); PowerNerd (2024); "The Moth" (2026) |

=== Former members ===
| Image | Name | Years active | Band(s) | Instruments | Release contributions |
|---|---|---|---|---|---|
| | Adrian White | 1994–1995 | Strapping Young Lad | drums | Heavy as a Really Heavy Thing (1995) SYL; Cooked on Phonics (1996); City (1997) SYL |
| | Ashley Scribner | 1994–1995 | Strapping Young Lad | bass | Heavy as a Really Heavy Thing (1995) SYL |
| | Mike Sudar | 1994–1995 | Strapping Young Lad | guitars | Heavy as a Really Heavy Thing (1995) SYL |
| | Jed Simon | 1995–2007 (guest 2012) | Strapping Young Lad | guitars; backing vocals | all SYL releases; Physicist (2000); The Retinal Circus (2013); The Puzzle (2021) |
| | Byron Stroud | 1996–2007 | Strapping Young Lad | bass; backing vocals | all SYL releases, except Heavy as a Really Heavy Thing (1995); Cooked on Phonics (1996); Physicist (2000) |
| | Gene Hoglan | 1996–2007 | Strapping Young Lad | drums | all SYL releases, except Heavy as a Really Heavy Thing (1995); Infinity (1998); Physicist (2000); Terria (2001) |
| | Dave Young | 2002–2018 | Devin Townsend Band; Devin Townsend Project | guitars (2009–2018); keyboards (2002–2014); backing vocals | all DTB releases; Alien (2005) SYL; Ki (2009) DTP; Addicted (2009) DTP; Ghost (June 20, 2011) DTP; By a Thread: Live in London 2011 (2012) DTP; Epicloud (2012) DTP; The Retinal Circus (2013); Z² (2014) DTP; Transcendence (2016) DTP; Ocean Machine - Live at the Ancient Roman Theatre Plovdiv (2018) DTP |
| | Brian "Beav" Waddell | 2002–2018 | Devin Townsend Band; Devin Townsend Project | guitars (2002–2006); bass (2009–2018); backing vocals | all DTB releases; Addicted (2009) DTP; By a Thread: Live in London 2011 (2012) DTP; Epicloud (2012) DTP; The Retinal Circus (2013); Z^{2} (2014) DTP; Transcendence (2016) DTP; Ocean Machine - Live at the Ancient Roman Theatre Plovdiv (2018) DTP |
| | Ryan Van Poederooyen | 2002–2018 | Devin Townsend Band; Devin Townsend Project | drums | all DTB releases; Addicted (2009) DTP; Deconstruction (2011) DTP; By a Thread: Live in London 2011 (2012) DTP; Epicloud (2012) DTP; The Retinal Circus (2013); Z^{2} (2014) DTP; Transcendence (2016) DTP; Ocean Machine - Live at the Ancient Roman Theatre Plovdiv (2018) DTP |
| | Mike Young | 2002–2006 | Devin Townsend Band | bass | all DTB releases |
| | Anneke van Giersbergen | 2009–2017 | Devin Townsend Project | additional vocals | Addicted (2009) DTP; By a Thread: Live in London 2011 (2012) DTP; Epicloud (2012) DTP; The Retinal Circus (2013); Z^{2} (2014) DTP; Transcendence (2016) DTP; The Puzzle (2021); Lightwork (2022); "The Moth" (2026) |
| | Mark Cimino | 2009 | Devin Townsend Project | guitars | Addicted (2009) DTP; Z^{2} (2014); The Puzzle (2021) |
| | Mike St-Jean | 2014–2018 | Devin Townsend Project | keyboards | Ghost (2011) DTP; Casualties of Cool (2014) CoC; Z^{2} (2014) DTP; Transcendence (2016) DTP; Ocean Machine - Live at the Ancient Roman Theatre Plovdiv (2018) DTP; The Puzzle (2021) |
| | Ché Aimee Dorval | 2014; 2019–2020 | Casualties of Cool; Solo | vocals; guitar | Ki (2009); Casualties of Cool (2014) CoC; Transcendence (2016) DTP; Empath (2019); The Puzzle (2021); Snuggles (2021); Lightwork (2022); Empath: Live in America (2023) |
| | Morgan Ågren | 2014; 2019–2020 | Casualties of Cool; Solo | drums; percussion | Casualties of Cool (2014) CoC; Z^{2} (2014) DTP; Empath (2019); The Puzzle (2021); Snuggles (2021); Lightwork (2022); Empath: Live in America (2023) |
| | Nathan Navarro | 2019–2020 | Solo | bass | Empath (2019); The Puzzle (2021); Snuggles (2021); Lightwork (2022); Empath: Live in America (2023) |
| | Diego Tejeida | 2019–2020 | Solo | keyboards | The Puzzle (2021); Snuggles (2021); Lightwork (2022); Empath: Live in America (2023); PowerNerd (2024) |
| | Arabella Backford | 2019 | Solo | backing vocals | The Puzzle (2021); Snuggles (2021) |
| | Anne Preis | 2019 | Solo | backing vocals | The Puzzle (2021); Snuggles (2021) |
| | Samantha Preis | 2019 | Solo | backing vocals | The Puzzle (2021); Snuggles (2021) |
| | Markus Reuter | 2019 | Solo | touch guitars | Snuggles (2021) |
| | Wes Hauch | 2020 | Solo | guitars | Galactic Quarantine (2021) |
| | Dirk Verbeuren | 2020 (Metal cruise shows only) | Solo | drums | Deconstruction (2011) DTP |
| | Kyle Konkiel | 2020 (Metal cruise shows only) | Solo | bass | none |
| | Liam Wilson | 2020 | Solo | bass | Galactic Quarantine (2021) |
| | Kerim “Krimh” Lechner | 2020 | Solo | drums | none |
| | Samus Paulicelli | 2020 | Solo | drums | Empath (2019); Galactic Quarantine (2021) |
| | Stephen Platt | 2021–2022 | Solo | guitars | none |
| | Pete Rinaldi | 2025 | Solo | guitars | none |
| | Lynn Wu | 2025 | Solo | vocals | The Moth (2026) |
