= Emerald Web =

American musical duo

Emerald Web was an American musical duo, made up of the husband-wife team of Bob Stohl and Kat Epple. Founded in 1978 and active through the 1980s, Stohl and Epple were pioneers in New Age, ambient, and electronic music.

== History ==
In the early 1970s, Bob Stohl and Kat Epple met at a jam session at the University of Florida. They relocated to Connecticut and established Emerald Web in 1978.

Both Stohl and Epple had trained as keyboardists and flute players before learning how to program, patch, and play synthesizers to incorporate into their music. After purchasing an Electronic Music Labs SynKey 2001, the duo began to provide feedback and consultations to the synth manufacturer. The albums Dragon Wings and Wizard Tales (1979) and Whispered Visions (1980) were both produced in Connecticut.

In 1980, the couple relocated to San Francisco to be closer to the growing New Age music scene and set up their own home recording studio in the hills above Berkeley. They also established their own record label, Stargate Records, to release their music on cassette tape.

In the 1980s, Emerald Web gained a growing audience and were often featured on the influential New Age radio program Hearts of Space. Due in part to their friendship with scientists, the duo performed at non-traditional music venues such as the California Academy of Sciences, Morrison Planetarium, and Chabot Astronomical Observatory.

In 1990, the duo relocated to Fort Myers, Florida.

The partnership ended with Stohl's accidental death by drowning in March 1990, at the age of 35.

== Musical style and influence ==
Emerald Web composed and recorded music in the New Age and electronic genres. They were known for innovative synthesizer orchestration and created a unique blend of "electronic space music" made by using synthesizers, sequencers, and acoustic instruments. Both Epple and Stohl were also flautists; their flute-dominated music achieved a distinctive sound among New Age artists. Stohl was also noted for his musicianship on the Lyricon, a woodwind/synthesizer hybrid. Their recordings featured electronic instruments such as the Minimoog, an Oberheim sequencer, and the ARP 2600.

Many of their records were composed and recorded in their own home studio using a 4-track reel-to-reel and released on Stargate Records, their own home label.

Thematically, their work was influenced by hard science and technology (including astronomy and early computing) as well as science fiction and fantasy.

In addition to recording their music and performing in concert, Emerald Web composed many television soundtracks, including National Geographic, PBS Nova, CNN, Apple Computers, NASA, and Carl Sagan's documentary films. They won several Emmy Awards. They also composed music for a wide range of other applications, from films to planetarium shows. They received a Grammy nomination in 1986 for their album Catspaw.

== Kat Epple solo career ==
Epple continued to compose and record under her own name as a solo artist and with the ensemble White Crow (1997). She also played flute and other instruments on Devin Townsend's records Ghost, Z², Casualties of Cool, The Puzzle and Snuggles. On her own and as part of Emerald Web, Epple has won eight Emmys and ten Addy Awards for work in composing music for television.

== Discography ==
- 1979 - Dragon Wings and Wizard Tales
- 1980 - Whispered Visions
- 1980 - Sound Trek
- 1981 - Valley of the Birds
- 1982 - Aqua Regia
- 1983 - Love Unfolding, with Jay Scott Neale
- 1983 - Nocturne
- 1984 - Lights of the Ivory Plains
- 1986 - Traces of Time
- 1986 - Catspaw
- 1988 - Dreamspun
- 1990 - Manatee Dreams of Neptune
- 2013 - Sanctus Spiritus
- 2013 - Garden of Mirrors
- 2013 - The Stargate Tapes: 1979-1983
- 2014 - Whispered Visions (re-release)
- 2019 - Sound Trek (remastered)
- 2020 - Valley of the Birds (remastered)

== See also ==
- List of ambient music artists
