= Lightwork =

2022 album by Devin Townsend

- Lightwork cover

Studio album by Devin Townsend
- Released: November 4, 2022
- Studio: The Warehouse (Vancouver, British Columbia, Canada); The Farm (Gibsons, British Columbia, Canada); The Armoury (Vancouver, British Columbia, Canada); Lighthouse (Vancouver, British Columbia, Canada)
- Genre: Progressive rock
- Length: 55:59
- Label: HevyDevy, InsideOut Music
- Producer: Gggarth, Devin Townsend

Devin Townsend chronology
The Puzzle / Snuggles (2021)	Lightwork (2022)	PowerNerd (2024)

Singles from Lightwork
- 1. "Moonpeople" Released: August 26, 2022; 2. "Call of the Void" Released: September 27, 2022; 3. "Lightworker" Released: October 25, 2022

Professional ratings
Review scores
Source	Rating
Blabbermouth.net	8.5/10
Kerrang!	3/5
Metal Hammer	4/5 stars
Metal Injection	9/10

Lightwork is the twenty-first studio album by Canadian musician Devin Townsend, released on November 4, 2022. The album has been described by Devin as a return to a "song oriented album", with "more traditional arrangements", after his latest releases (Empath and The Puzzle). Lyrically, the album addresses the struggles of the COVID-19 pandemic, while reflecting about the post-pandemic future.

== Track listing ==
All lyrics are written by Devin Townsend; all music is composed by Townsend, except where noted.

Lightwork
No.	Title	Music	Length
1.	"Moonpeople"		4:44
2.	"Lightworker"		5:29
3.	"Equinox"		4:39
4.	"Call of the Void"	Townsend, Mattias Eklund, Martin Kennedy	5:53
5.	"Heartbreaker"		7:00
6.	"Dimensions"		5:23
7.	"Celestial Signals"	Townsend, Diego Tejeida (ending)	5:12
8.	"Heavy Burden"		4:23
9.	"Vacation"		3:10
10.	"Children of God"		10:06
Total length:			55:59

Nightwork (deluxe edition bonus disc)
No.	Title	Length
1.	"Starchasm, Pt. 2"	4:34
2.	"Stampys Blaster"	0:38
3.	"Factions"	5:13
4.	"Yogi"	3:57
5.	"Precious Sardine"	10:14
6.	"Hope Is in the World"	4:16
7.	"Children of Dog" (alternate version of “Children of God")	6:45
8.	"Sober"	4:37
9.	"Boogus"	3:33
10.	"Carry Me Home"	4:04
Total length:		47:50

== Personnel ==
- Devin Townsend – guitar, bass guitar, vocals, synths
- Darby Todd – drums
- Morgan Ågren – additional drums
- Federico Paulovich – additional drums
- Diego Tejeida – additional keyboards
- Nathan Navarro – additional bass guitar
- Elektra Women's Choir – additional vocals (on "Heavy Burden"), choir vocals
- Echo Picone – additional vocals (on "Heavy Burden")
- Jonas Hellborg – additional bass guitar (on "Dimensions")
- Mike Keneally – guitar solo (on "Dimensions")
- Rhys Fulber – additional programming (on "Equinox")
- Hutch Hutchinson – bass guitar (on "Vacation")
- Joy Lapps – steel pan drums (on "Vacation")
- Ché Aimee Dorval – additional vocals
- Anneke van Giersbergen – additional vocals
- Aman Khosa – additional vocals (on "Heavy Burden")
- Tanya Ghosh – additional vocals (on "Heavy Burden")
- Elizabeth Zharoff – additional choir vocals
- Tia Rose Maxfield – additional choir vocals
- Brian Diamond – additional choir vocals
- Ram Dass – voice sample (on "Lightworker")

Technical and artwork personnel

- Gggarth – production, engineering
- Devin Townsend – production, mixing, engineering
- Troy Glessner – mixing assistant, mastering
- Nygel Asselin – mix setup, engineering
- John "Bandstack" Beatle Bailey – engineering
- Travis Smith – artwork, layout
- Paul Harries – photography

== Charts ==
Weekly chart performance for Lightwork
Chart (2022)	Peak position
Austrian Albums (Ö3 Austria)	16
Belgian Albums (Ultratop Flanders)	122
Dutch Albums (Album Top 100)	40
Finnish Albums (Suomen virallinen lista)	9
French Albums (SNEP)	131
German Albums (Offizielle Top 100)	24
Scottish Albums (OCC)	11
Swiss Albums (Schweizer Hitparade)	21
UK Albums (OCC)	50
UK Album Downloads (OCC)	11
UK Rock & Metal Albums (OCC)	2
US Top Album Sales (Billboard)	92
US Top Current Album Sales (Billboard)	56

== Nightwork ==
Nightwork
- Nightwork cover

Studio album by Devin Townsend
- Released: November 4, 2022
- Recorded: Lighthouse (Vancouver, British Columbia, Canada)
- Length: 47:51
- Label: HevyDevy, InsideOut Music
- Producer: Devin Townsend

Nightwork is a bonus album released with the deluxe edition of Lightwork. According to Devin Townsend, the songs that ended up on Nightwork do not form a "throwaway album", they are songs that thematically didn't fit the main record. Some critics have pointed out the more experimental nature of Nightwork, compared to Lightwork.

=== Track listing ===
All tracks are written by Devin Townsend.

Nightwork track listing
No.	Title	Length
1.	"Starchasm, Pt. 2"	4:34
2.	"Stampys Blaster"	0:38
3.	"Factions"	5:13
4.	"Yogi"	3:57
5.	"Precious Sardine"	10:14
6.	"Hope Is in the World"	4:16
7.	"Children of Dog"	6:45
8.	"Sober"	4:37
9.	"Boogus"	3:33
10.	"Carry Me Home"	4:04
Total length:		47:51

=== Personnel ===
- Devin Townsend – guitar, bass guitar, vocals, synths
- Morgan Ågren – drums
- Aman Khosa – additional vocals (on "Precious Sardine")
- Tanya Ghosh – additional vocals (on "Precious Sardine")
- Mattias Eklund – additional instrumentation (on "Sober")
- Steve Vai – additional instrumentation (on "Starchasm Pt. 2")
- Anneke van Giersbergen – vocals (on "Starchasm Pt. 2")

Technical personnel

- Devin Townsend – production, mixing, engineering
