= The Puzzle / Snuggles =

2021 albums by Devin Townsend

- The Puzzle cover

Studio album by Devin Townsend
- Released: December 3, 2021
- Recorded: 2020–2021
- Studio: The Armoury Studios, The Farm, Devlab, and The Armory, Vancouver, Canada
- Genre: Ambient, experimental
- Length: 65:17 (The Puzzle); 38:32 (Snuggles)
- Label: HevyDevy
- Producer: Devin Townsend

Devin Townsend chronology
Empath (2019)	The Puzzle / Snuggles (2021)	Lightwork (2022)

Snuggles
- Snuggles cover

The Puzzle and Snuggles are the nineteenth and the twentieth studio albums by Canadian metal musician Devin Townsend, released on his own label HevyDevy Records on December 3, 2021.

== Production ==
Devin Townsend has explained that The Puzzle is "an elaborate and much more chilled out" version of his 2004 album Devlab and "more a collaborative, multimedia art project that acts as a stopgap between Empath and the next record" that "gave me a chance to purge and be completely creatively free", whereas Snuggles is "meant to be something you listen to in order to feel better... Puzzle is chaos, Snuggles is calm. The whole project is meant to express that I think there is a light at the end of this dark tunnel we’ve been through." The two albums serve as a prelude to a "more traditional album", Lightwork, produced by Garth Richardson (Rage Against the Machine, Mudvayne, Nickelback) and released in November 2022, and "an ambitious project he’s been teasing for years called The Moth".

== Track listing ==
All tracks are written by Devin Townsend, except were noted.

The Puzzle track listing
No.	Title	Writer(s)	Length
1.	"Chromatic Ridge"		3:43
2.	"Life Is But a Dream"		3:29
3.	"Yucky Lung"		1:22
4.	"Kittenhead"		1:13
5.	"Shark in the Ice"		1:49
6.	"Devil in the Details"		0:58
7.	"Hammerhead Sugarplum"		3:47
8.	"Me and the Moon"		4:12
9.	"Anxiety in Pyjamas"		3:28
10.	"The Yugas"	Townsend, Mike Keneally	3:01
11.	"Albert Hall"		3:58
12.	"StarChasm"	Townsend, Steve Vai	3:59
13.	"Perfect Owl"		2:17
14.	"Maybe Over the Void"	Townsend, Mattias Eklundh	2:56
15.	"Light Year Whale"	Townsend, Anneke Van Giersbergen	4:31
16.	"FrogFlowers"	Townsend, Eklundh	1:11
17.	"Mother"	Townsend, Tina Ahlin	4:28
18.	"Southern Sky Geometry"		2:11
19.	"The Puzzle"		5:22
20.	"Monuments of Glitch"		7:22
Total length:			65:17

Snuggles track listing
No.	Title	Writer(s)	Length
1.	"Beyond Measure"		1:31
2.	"Blue Dot"	Townsend, Ché Aimee Dorval	3:07
3.	"Drifting and Dreaming"		4:26
4.	"Sundance"		0:53
5.	"Minds Are Changing"		3:46
6.	"The Ocean"		4:54
7.	"Distant, Elegant"		3:34
8.	"Replikiss"		3:33
9.	"I Agree"		3:23
10.	"Tryst"		3:30
11.	"Sunset Rump"		1:32
12.	"The Option"		4:23
Total length:			38:32

== Personnel ==
Credits adapted from the albums' liner notes.

=== The Puzzle ===
- Devin Townsend – bass, guitar, vocals, keyboards and synths
- Morgan Ågren — drums and percussion, vocals
- Fazal – drums and percussion
- Anup Sastry — drums and percussion
- Chris Kelly — drums and percussion, vocals
- Kat Epple — drums and percussion, keyboards and synths, strings, wind instruments, and horns
- Nathan Navarro – bass
- Jonas Hellborg – bass
- Jean Savoie – bass
- Mike Keneally – guitar
- Aman Khosla – guitar, vocals
- Steve Vai – guitar
- Plini – guitar
- Mark Cimino – guitar, vocals, keyboards and synths
- Matt Picone – guitar
- Andy McKee – guitar
- Jed Simon – guitar
- Chrys Johnson – guitar
- Yotam Afik – guitar
- Buckley Kelly – guitar
- Ana Patan – guitar, vocals
- John Bertsche – guitar, vocals
- Tina Ågren – vocals
- Echo Picone – vocals
- Tanya Ghosh – vocals
- Gitai Barak – vocals
- Ché Aimee Dorval – vocals
- Anneke van Giersbergen – vocals
- Samantha Preis – vocals
- Anne Preis – vocals
- Arabella Packford – vocals
- Blindboy Boatclub – vocals
- Shiraz Afik – vocals
- Korina Savoie – vocals
- Chris Johnson – vocals
- Mom Alvarado – vocals
- Pete Mark – vocals
- Amy Wong – vocals
- Mattias Eklundh – keyboards and synths, strings, wind instruments, and horns
- Diego Tejeida – keyboards and synths
- Ben Searles – keyboards and synths
- Mike St-Jean – keyboards and synths
- Phillip Peterson – strings, wind instruments, and horns
- Neyveli Radhakrishna – strings, wind instruments, and horns
- Jørgen Munkeby – strings, wind instruments, and horns

=== Snuggles ===
- Devin Townsend – drums and percussion, bass, guitar, vocals, keyboards and synths
- Morgan Ågren – drums and percussion
- Chris Kelly – drums and percussion
- Paul Soroski – drums and percussion
- Jake VanDerGinst – drums and percussion
- Kat Epple – drums and percussion, keyboards and synths, strings, wind instruments, and horns
- Andy McKee – drums and percussion, guitar
- Nathan Navarro – bass
- Jean Savoie – bass
- Andy Timmons – guitar
- Markus Reuter – guitar
- Chrys Johnson – guitar
- Buckley Kelly – guitar
- Ana Patan – guitar, vocals
- Tina Ahlin – vocals
- Aman Khosla – vocals
- Tanya Ghosh – vocals
- Omer Cordell – vocals
- Ché Aimee Dorval – vocals
- Ash Pearson – vocals
- Chika Buston – vocals
- Samantha Preis – vocals
- Anne Preis – vocals
- Arabella Packford – vocals
- Adrian Mottram – vocals
- Katrina Natale – vocals
- Mattias Eklund – keyboards and synths, strings, wind instruments, and horns
- Diego Tejeida – keyboards and synths
- Phillip Peterson – strings, wind instruments, and horns
- Neyveli Radhakrishna – strings, wind instruments, and horns

=== Technical ===
- Devin Townsend – production, engineering, editing, mixing
- Leonardo Delgado – additional editing
- Troy Glessner – mastering
- Levi Seitz – lacquer cut
- Travis Smith – artwork, packaging design

== Charts ==
Chart performance for The Puzzle / Snuggles
Chart (2021)	Peak position
Finnish Albums (Suomen virallinen lista)	50
