= Anthem (The Wildhearts song) =

Single by The Wildhearts
- Released: August 1997
- Genre: Hardcore punk
- Label: Mushroom
- Songwriter(s): CJ Wildheart, Ginger, Jef Streatfield, Ritch Battersby

The Wildhearts singles chronology
| "Anthem" (1997) | "Urge" (1997) |

CD 1 cover

CD 2 cover

"Anthem" is a single released in August 1997 by the Wildhearts, on the Mushroom Records label. It was the first Wildhearts single to be released on multiple formats (formats: CD1 (MUSH6CD), CD2 (MUSH6CDX), 7" vinyl (MUSH6S)) with different B-sides on each format, which caused some uproar at the time from longtime fans of the band. It reached number 21 on the UK chart.

The single was the first from the album Endless, Nameless and the first officially released Wildhearts song to feature someone other than Ginger on lead vocals, in this case bassist Danny McCormack.

== Track listings ==
=== CD1 ===
1. Anthem
2. So Good To Be Back Home
3. Time To Let You Go

=== CD2 ===
1. Anthem
2. White Lies
3. The Song Formally Known As?

=== 7" ===
1. Anthem
2. He's a Whore
