= Jeff Schmidt (musician) =

American bassist

Jeff Schmidt is an American bassist. He is left-handed, but having learned to play on an inverted right-handed bass he still plays with the strings the opposite way to convention, i.e. highest string at the top. He also tunes his basses higher than normal using lighter strings, also known as Piccolo bass.

In 2005, Schmidt placed first in the Bass Extremes International Contemporary Solo Bass Competition. The competition was judged by Victor Wooten, Will Lee of the CBS Orchestra of the Late Show with David Letterman, Anthony Jackson, Steve Bailey and Gregg Bissonette.

He generally performs solo and produces a podcast about his own music making and bass playing in general.

== Discography ==
- Outré (2007)

=== Guest appearances ===
- Gates of Gnomeria (2007) by Andy McKee - on two tracks
- Casualties of Cool (2014) by Casualties of Cool - additional bass guitar, live bass.
