= Urge (song) =

Single by The Wildhearts
- Released: October 1997
- Genre: Rock
- Label: Mushroom
- Songwriter(s): Ginger Wildheart

The Wildhearts singles chronology
"Anthem" (1997)	"Urge" (1997)	"Vanilla Radio" (2002)

"Urge" is the second single from the album Endless, Nameless by the Wildhearts. The single was released in three different formats featuring different B-sides. Former guitarist Devin Townsend sings backing vocals on the CD1 B-side "Kill Me To Death". "Genius Penis" was written by drummer Ritch Battersby and features guest vocals by Vickie Perks from Fuzzbox.

== Track listings ==
CD1

1. Urge
2. Fugazi (Do the Fake)
3. Kill Me to Death

CD2

1. Urge
2. Zomboid
3. Genius Penis

7"

1. Urge
2. Lost Highway

== Charts ==
Chart (1997)	Peak position
UK Indie (OCC)	2
UK Singles (OCC)	26
