= PowerNerd =

Studio album by Devin Townsend
- Released: October 25, 2024
- Studio: Armoury (Vancouver); Demi-Tone (Vancouver); Lighthouse (Vancouver); Mythgraven; Lip Service
- Genre: Progressive metal
- Length: 44:04
- Label: Inside Out; HevyDevy
- Producer: Devin Townsend

Devin Townsend chronology
Lightwork (2022)	PowerNerd (2024)	The Moth (2026)

Singles from PowerNerd
- 1. "PowerNerd" Released: August 23, 2024; 2. "Jainism" Released: September 18, 2024; 3. "Gratitude" Released: October 14, 2024

PowerNerd is the twenty-second studio album by Canadian metal musician Devin Townsend. It was released on October 25, 2024, through Inside Out Music and HevyDevy Records.

== Background ==
About the album's title, Devin Townsend commented "I would say that a powernerd would be somebody that has a tendency that society has deemed weak or not valuable, whether that's empathy or being an insular person or an introvert, and turns that into a type of personal power." Townsend reportedly gave himself only 11 days to write the entire album, and 1 day to rehearse it.

According to Townsend, of all the albums he's ever made, PowerNerd was "[the] most fraught with unexpected sidelines": The album was originally meant to feature Eloy Casagrande on drums, Mike Inez on bass, and Wes Hauch on guitar; unfortunately, by the time of recording, Casagrande had joined Slipknot, Inez began touring with Elton John, and Hauch went on tour with Alluvial. Additionally, Townsend was hoping to outsource mixing the album, but that fell through due to scheduling issues as well. Drums for the album were ultimately done by Darby Todd, who learned all the drum parts in a single day and recorded them in the following two days.

== Musical style ==
The album has been described as progressive metal. Some critics noted that the album had a simpler, more accessible sound compared to Townsend's previous albums.

== Reception ==
PowerNerd received positive reviews from music critics upon release. Jordan Blum, writing for Metal Injection, gave the album a score of 9/10 and wrote "Without a doubt, Townsend still gets tons of mileage out of the uniquely philosophical and musical worlds he's crafted, making PowerNerd another superbly entertaining and intellectually, emotionally fulfilling addition to his catalog." Kerrang! awarded it a score of 3/5 and stated "If you’re looking for divisive, multi-toned prog metal you’ll find little of that here – closer Ruby Quaker has a tongue-in-cheek blast therein – but should you appreciate the less eccentric side of this polymath’s output, plug in and power up."

== Track listing ==
PowerNerd track listing
No.	Title	Length
1.	"PowerNerd"	3:28
2.	"Falling Apart"	4:23
3.	"Knuckledragger"	4:30
4.	"Gratitude"	3:29
5.	"Dreams of Light"	0:54
6.	"Ubelia"	3:58
7.	"Jainism"	4:16
8.	"Younger Lover"	4:09
9.	"Glacier"	4:22
10.	"Goodbye"	5:58
11.	"Ruby Quaker"	4:32
Total length:		44:04

PowerNerd – Digipak CD bonus tracks
No.	Title	Length
12.	"Flow" (Demo)	8:02
13.	"Trustfxxx" (Demo)	8:17
14.	"Vast" (Demo)	9:44
Total length:		70:07

== Personnel ==
Musicians

- Devin Townsend – vocals, guitars, synthesizers, bass, computer
- Darby Todd – drums
- Diego Tejeida – keyboards, synthesizers
- Mike Keneally – additional keyboards
- Mark Cimino – acoustic guitar
- Aman Khosa – background vocals
- Jean Savoie – additional bass on "Ruby Quaker"
- Tanya Ghosh – additional vocals on "Falling Apart"
- Jamey Jasta – additional vocals on "PowerNerd"

Technical

- Devin Townsend – production, mixing, engineering
- Lynn Glessner – mastering
- Troy Glessner – mastering
- Jakob Herrmann – engineering
- Sheldon Zaharko – engineering
- Ben Searles – engineering
- Kyle – engineering
- Jon – engineering
- Benji Ryen Smith – guitar re-amp recording
- John Bertche – acoustic guitars recording
- Mark Cimino – acoustic guitars recording
- Paul Silveira – engineering assistance
- Jess Schmidt – engineering assistance
- Tricia Maier – engineering assistance
- Theo Caseley – engineering assistance
- Jasper Schuurmans – project coordination
- Jean Savoie – bass technician

Visuals

- Travis Smith – artwork, packaging design
- Tanya Ghosh – photography

== Charts ==
Chart performance for PowerNerd
Chart (2024)	Peak position
Austrian Albums (Ö3 Austria)	33
Belgian Albums (Ultratop Flanders)	187
Dutch Albums (Album Top 100)	57
Finnish Albums (Suomen virallinen lista)	15
German Albums (Offizielle Top 100)	32
Scottish Albums (OCC)	28
Swiss Albums (Schweizer Hitparade)	18
UK Album Downloads (OCC)	21
UK Rock & Metal Albums (OCC)	4
