= Empath (album) =

2019 album by Devin Townsend

Studio album by Devin Townsend
- Released: March 29, 2019
- Recorded: 2018
- Studio: Monnow Valley Studios, Rockfield, Wales, UK; The Armoury Studios, The Farm, Devlab, and The Armory, Vancouver, Canada; The Grid, Montreal, Canada
- Genre: Progressive metal, avant-garde metal
- Length: 74:08
- Label: Inside Out; HevyDevy
- Producer: Devin Townsend

Devin Townsend chronology
Transcendence (2016)	Empath (2019)	The Puzzle / Snuggles (2021)

Devin Townsend solo chronology
Dark Matters (2014)	Empath (2019)	The Puzzle / Snuggles (2021)

Singles from Empath
- 1. "Genesis" Released: February 22, 2019; 2. "Evermore" Released: March 15, 2019; 3. "Spirits Will Collide" Released: March 29, 2019; 4. "Why?" Released: September 16, 2019

Professional ratings
Aggregate scores
Source	Rating
Metacritic	84/100
Review scores
Source	Rating
AllMusic	4/5 stars
Consequence of Sound	B+
Exclaim!	8/10
Metal Injection	9.5/10
MetalSucks	5/5 stars
Sonic Perspectives	9/10
Sputnikmusic	4.5/5

Empath is the eighteenth studio album by Canadian metal musician Devin Townsend, released on his own label HevyDevy Records on March 29, 2019. It is his first solo album since Dark Matters, which was a part of the 2014 double album Z², and his first release to act solely as a solo album since 2007's Ziltoid the Omniscient.

== Production ==
On January 31, 2018, Townsend announced on his Facebook page that he was taking a break from the Devin Townsend Project, which had been his main project since 2008. This would make Empath Townsend's first release to act solely as a solo album since 2007's Ziltoid the Omniscient. The Empath project was first mentioned in a tweet from January 1, 2017, and officially announced two years later, along with its release date, on January 15, 2019, when work on the album had already been completed.

A statement on his official Facebook page stated about the origins of the album:

On this album Devin has decided to see what would happen if all the styles that make up his current interests were finally represented in one place. To finally shake the fear of expectation, and just do what it is he was meant to do creatively, EMPATH, true to the name, is about allowing the audience a feeling for a variety of musical emotions. The musical dynamics represented on this single album are broad, challenging, and immense. To approach this sort of work with a long history of what makes heavy music ‘heavy’, allows this to be done with a type of power rarely heard."

It was also described as "A bold statement with massive production values and dynamic, uncompromised musicality. This is a statement about not only pursuing creative freedom in a conservative scene, but also trying to show that heavy music is truly a valid musical tool." Guest performers include former Frank Zappa collaborators Mike Keneally, Morgan Ågren and Steve Vai, as well as Samus Paulicelli from Decrepit Birth, Anup Sastry, Chad Kroeger, Townsend's regular collaborator Anneke van Giersbergen, Ché Aimee Dorval (who had worked with Townsend on Casualties of Cool), Elliot Desgagnés from Beneath the Massacre, and Ryan Dahle. Townsend credited Kroeger with the direction of the record; Townsend wanted to make a pop record to make the record more financially viable, but Kroeger felt that would've been disingenuous.

A series of documentary videos detailing the making of Empath has been released on YouTube.

On February 22, 2019, the first single from the album, "Genesis", was released. A corresponding video was also debuted that complemented the song's intricate style. On March 15, 2019, a second single titled "Evermore" was released; an accompanying music video was made for the single, which features a 2D animated cat flying through space.

== Release ==
Empath was released on March 29, 2019. Editions include a limited 2-CD digipak with a disc of bonus material, a gatefold 180 g 2-LP vinyl + CD + LP booklet edition.

== Critical response ==
Wall of Sound gave the album a perfect score of 10/10, writing: "Devin's need for deeper creative expression has resulted in one of the year's most memorable works".

Angry Metal Guy contributor GardensTale gave Empath a score of 4.0/5.0, calling it "...the most Devin album Devin ever recorded."

Loudwire named it one of the 50 best metal albums of 2019.

== Track listing ==
All tracks are written by Devin Townsend unless otherwise noted.

No.	Title	Length
1.	"Castaway"	2:28
2.	"Genesis"	6:05
3.	"Spirits Will Collide"	4:39
4.	"Evermore"	5:30
5.	"Sprite"	6:37
6.	"Hear Me"	6:30
7.	"Why?"	4:59
8.	"Borderlands"	11:02
9.	"Requiem"	2:46
10.	"Singularity": "I. Adrift"; "II. I Am I"; "III. There Be Monsters"; "IV. Curious Gods" (co-written by Mike Keneally and Morgan Ågren); "V. Silicon Scientists"; "VI. Here Comes the Sun!"	23:33: 5:00; 3:29; 4:37; 3:08; 2:55; 4:23
Total length:		74:08

Disc 2: Tests of Manhood (Limited Edition only)
No.	Title	Length
1.	"The Contrarian" (demo version)	5:41
2.	"King" (demo version)	5:29
3.	"The Waiting Kind" (demo version)	3:54
4.	"Empath" (demo version, co-written by Keneally)	5:11
5.	"Methuselah" (demo version, co-written by Keneally)	4:07
6.	"This Is Your Life" (demo version)	4:15
7.	"Gulag" (demo version)	5:38
8.	"Middle Aged Man" (demo version)	3:25
9.	"Total Collapse" (demo version)	5:41
10.	"Summer" (demo version)	6:15
Total length:		49:36

== Personnel ==
- Devin Townsend – lead vocals, guitars, bass, keyboards, programming, production
- Nathan Navarro – bass ("Genesis", "Evermore", "Why?", "Borderlands")
- Morgan Ågren – drums ("Genesis", "Sprite", "Why?", "Borderlands", "Curious Gods", "Empath", "Summer")
- Samus "66Samus" Paulicelli – drums ("Genesis", "Hear Me", "There Be Monsters", "Gulag", "Middle Aged Man", "Total Collapse")
- Anup Sastry – drums ("Genesis", "Spirits Will Collide", "Evermore", "Borderlands", "I Am I", "Silicon Scientists", "Here Comes the Sun!", "King", "The Waiting Kind", "Singularity")
- Elliot Desgagnés – additional death metal vocals ("Genesis", "Spirits Will Collide", "Evermore", "Sprite", "Why?", "There Be Monsters")
- Ché Aimee Dorval – additional vocals ("Genesis")
- Anneke van Giersbergen – additional vocals ("Hear Me", "Here Comes the Sun!", "King")
- Chad Kroeger – additional vocals ("Hear Me")
- Josefa Torres – additional vocals ("Sprite")
- Ron Getgood – additional vocals (spoken intro on "Sprite")
- Reyne Townsend – additional vocals
- Ryan Dahle – additional guitars ("Borderlands")
- Steve Vai – additional guitars ("Here Comes the Sun!")
- Shaun Verreault – pedal steel
- Elektra Women's Choir – choir
- Callum Marinho – whistles
- Mike Keneally – additional guitars, keyboards, co-production
- Adam "Nolly" Getgood – producer, engineering

== Charts ==
Chart (2019)	Peak position
Australian Albums (ARIA)	10
Austrian Albums (Ö3 Austria)	21
Belgian Albums (Ultratop Flanders)	39
Belgian Albums (Ultratop Wallonia)	72
Dutch Albums (Album Top 100)	21
Finnish Albums (Suomen virallinen lista)	2
French Albums (SNEP)	60
German Albums (Offizielle Top 100)	12
Norwegian Albums (VG-lista)	40
Scottish Albums (Official Charts)	13
Spanish Albums (PROMUSICAE)	60
Swiss Albums (Schweizer Hitparade)	9
UK Albums (Official Charts)	23
US Billboard 200	169
