= Devin Townsend =

Canadian musician (born 1972)

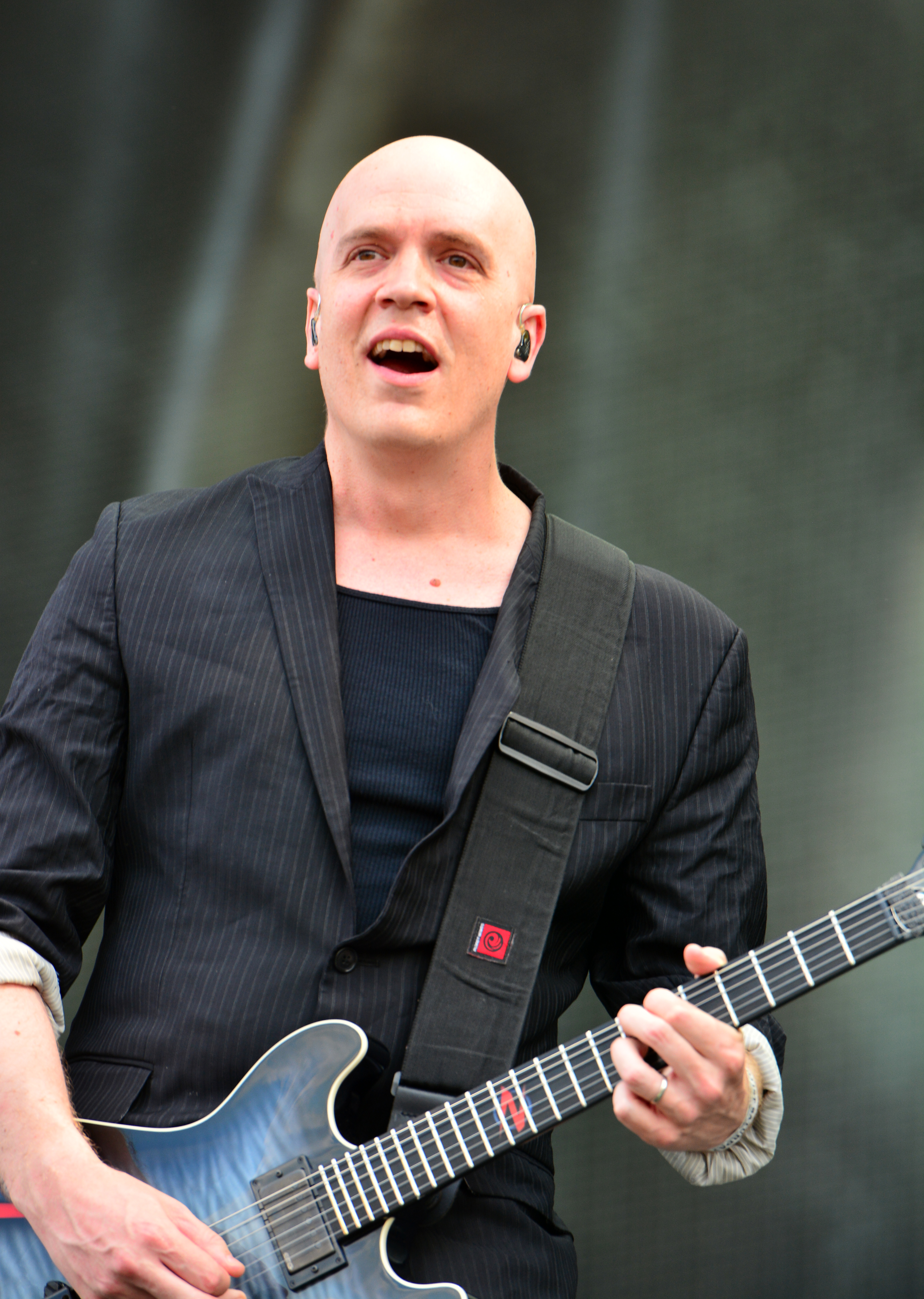
- Townsend performing at Wacken Open Air 2014

Background information
- Born: Devin Garrett Townsend; May 5, 1972 (age 54); New Westminster, British Columbia, Canada
- Genres: Heavy metal; extreme metal; progressive metal; alternative metal; hard rock; ambient
- Occupations: Singer; musician; songwriter; record producer
- Instruments: Vocals; guitar; keyboards
- Years active: 1980s–present
- Labels: HevyDevy; Century Media; Inside Out
- Member of: Casualties of Cool
- Formerly of: The Devin Townsend Band; Devin Townsend Project; Strapping Young Lad; Steve Vai; Punky Brüster; IR8; The Wildhearts; Bent Sea
- Members: List
- Website: hevydevy.com

Devin Garrett Townsend (born May 5, 1972) is a Canadian singer, guitarist, songwriter, and record producer. He founded extreme metal band Strapping Young Lad and was its primary songwriter, vocalist, and guitarist from 1994 to 2007. He also has an extensive solo career, and has released a total of 30 albums across all of his projects as of 2026.

After performing in a number of heavy metal bands in high school, Townsend was discovered in 1993 by a record label who asked him to perform lead vocals on Steve Vai's album Sex & Religion. After recording and touring with Vai, he was discouraged by what he found in the music industry and vented his anger on his 1995 solo album Heavy as a Really Heavy Thing, which he released under the pseudonym Strapping Young Lad. He soon assembled a band of the same name, with whom he released the critically acclaimed album City in 1997. Since then, he has released three more studio albums with Strapping Young Lad, along with solo material released under his own independent HevyDevy Records label.

Townsend's solo albums have featured a varying lineup of supporting musicians and are a mix of hard rock, progressive metal, ambient, and new-age. In 2002, he formed the Devin Townsend Band, which recorded and toured for two of his solo releases. In 2007, he disbanded both Strapping Young Lad and the Devin Townsend Band, taking a break from touring to spend more time with his family. After a two-year hiatus, he began recording again and soon announced the formation of the Devin Townsend Project. This band began with a series of four albums, released from 2009 to 2011 and each written in a different genre. Townsend continued to record and tour under the new moniker until January 2018.

Across all his bands and solo projects, Townsend has released 23 studio albums and four live albums. His trademark production style, featuring a heavily multi-tracked wall of sound, has been compared to the styles of Robert Fripp and Frank Zappa. His vocal delivery ranges from screaming to an opera-esque singing, while his musical style is rooted in metal and his albums are written to express different aspects of his personality.

== Biography ==
=== Early life (1972–1994) ===
Devin Garrett Townsend was born in New Westminster on May 5, 1972. His parents are of Irish and British descent, with his father working in the restaurant industry. He picked up the banjo when he was five and began playing guitar when he was 12. As a young teenager, he befriended Brian "Beav" Waddell, who would later play guitars as part of the Devin Townsend Band and bass on the Devin Townsend Project. He participated in several metal bands while he was in high school, and founded Grey Skies at the age of 19. Around the same time he joined a popular local group called Caustic Thought, replacing Jed Simon on guitar and playing alongside bassist Byron Stroud, both of whom would later become members of Townsend's flagship band, Strapping Young Lad. In 1993, Townsend began writing material under the name Noisescapes, a project he later described as "just as violent as Strapping Young Lad".

Townsend recorded a Noisescapes demo and sent copies to various record labels. Relativity Records responded to Townsend with a record deal and Townsend began work on what was to be the first Noisescapes album, Promise. Shortly afterward, the label introduced him to musician Steve Vai. Impressed with Townsend's vocal work, Vai offered him the role of the lead vocalist on his new album Sex & Religion. After recording Sex & Religion, Townsend accompanied Vai on a world tour in support of the album. Townsend soon landed a second tour, this time with the opening band of Vai's tour, the Wildhearts. He played live with the band throughout half of 1994 in Europe, and appeared as a guest musician on their single Urge. Ginger, the band's frontman, remained close friends with Townsend, later co-writing several songs on Infinity and the Christeen + 4 Demos EP.

While on tour with the Wildhearts, Townsend formed a short-lived thrash metal project with Metallica's then-bassist Jason Newsted. The band, known as IR8, featured Newsted on vocals and bass, Townsend on guitar, and Tom Hunting of Exodus on drums. The group recorded a few songs together, although Townsend says that they never intended to go further than that. "People heard about it and thought we wanted to put out a CD, which is absolutely not true," he explains. "People took this project way too seriously." A demo tape was put together, but the material was not released until 2002, when Newsted published the IR8 vs. Sexoturica compilation.

Though Townsend was proud of what he had accomplished so early in his career, he was discouraged by his experience with the music industry. "I was becoming a product of somebody else's imagination, and it was mixing with my own personality," he later reflected. "This combination was appalling." He pushed to get his own projects off the ground. Despite touring with other musicians, however, Townsend continued to face rejection of his own music. Relativity Records dropped Noisescapes from their label shortly after Townsend accepted Vai's offer, seeing no commercial appeal in Townsend's music. "I have a hunch they only offered me a deal to get me to sing with Steve," he mused. While touring with the Wildhearts, Townsend received a phone call from Monte Conner, then-A&R representative for Roadrunner Records, expressing an interest in his demos and an intention to sign him. After being briefly signed by the label, the offer was ultimately rescinded by Cees Wessels, the owner of Roadrunner, who regarded Townsend's recordings as "just noise".

=== Heavy as a Really Heavy Thing through Infinity (1994–1998) ===
In 1994, Century Media Records offered Townsend a contract to make "some extreme albums". He agreed to a five-album deal with the record label, and also provided much of the guitar work on the 1994 album Millennium and the 1995 album Hard Wired by Vancouver industrial band Front Line Assembly. Townsend began to record material under the pseudonym Strapping Young Lad. He avoided using his real name at this point in career, looking for a fresh start after his high-profile Vai gig. "At the beginning, I wanted to avoid at all cost to use my name because I was known as the singer for Steve Vai and it wasn't the best publicity to have," he later explained. "I was playing somebody else's music and I was judged in respect to that music." Townsend produced and performed nearly all the instruments on the debut studio album, Heavy as a Really Heavy Thing, which was released in April 1995.

Following the release of the record, Townsend and several other musician friends, Chris Valagao Mina, guitarist, vocal of Zimmers Hole, he knew in Vancouver recorded a rock opera in 1996 entitled Punky Brüster – Cooked on Phonics. Written and recorded in under a month, the album tells the fictional story of a death metal band from Poland that sells out becoming a punk rock band to achieve mainstream success. Townsend founded his own independent record label, HevyDevy Records, to release the album.

Townsend assembled a permanent lineup of Strapping Young Lad to record City, including prolific metal drummer Gene Hoglan (Dark Angel, Death, Testament), along with Townsend's former bandmates Jed Simon on guitar and Byron Stroud on bass. The industrial-influenced album was released in 1997. To this day, the album is widely considered Strapping Young Lad's best work, with Metal Maniacs calling it "groundbreaking" and Revolver naming it "one of the greatest metal albums of all time". Townsend himself considers it the band's "ultimate" album. Later that year, Townsend released his second solo album, Ocean Machine: Biomech with a guitarist Chris Valagao Mina. The album featured a mix of hard rock, ambient, and progressive rock. Dating back to the Sex and Religion tour, Townsend had been writing solo material for a project called Ocean Machine. The album, initially entitled Biomech, was recorded in 1995 and originally queued for release later that year in December on HevyDevy Records, a label created by Townsend solely for material he releases on his own. Due to unknown reasons, Ocean Machine: Biomech was put off for release until late 1996, but when the time came to finally release it Townsend had become unsatisfied with the recordings, rerecorded the entire album, and finally released in Japan on July 21, 1997.

During this period, Townsend was also asked to audition for the lead vocalist spot in Judas Priest after Rob Halford's departure. Though a fan of the band, he turned down the offer, explaining that: "No one would want to see Devin Townsend singing for Judas Priest. I mean, it's ridiculous."

After the completion of City and Ocean Machine: Biomech, Townsend began to approach a mental breakdown. He explained, "I started to see human beings as little lonesome, water based, pink meat life forms pushing air through themselves and making noises that the other little pieces of meat seemed to understand." In December 1997, he checked himself into a mental-health hospital, where he was diagnosed with bipolar disorder. The diagnosis helped him understand where the two sides of his music were coming from; he felt his disorder "gave birth to the two extremes that are Strapping's City record and Ocean Machine: Biomech." After being discharged from the hospital, Townsend found that "everything just clicked" and he was able to write his third solo album, Infinity, which he described as "the parent project" of City and Ocean Machine: Biomech, with music influenced by Broadway. Townsend returned to the studio, accompanied by Hoglan, to work on the album, on which Townsend played most of the instruments. Infinity was released in October 1998. Later in his career, Townsend has cited Infinity as his favorite solo record.

With Infinity, Townsend began to label all albums outside of Strapping Young Lad under his own name, dropping the Ocean Machine moniker, to reduce confusion. He wanted to show that despite the highly varied nature of his projects, they are all simply aspects of his identity. The album Biomech was relabeled and redistributed as Ocean Machine: Biomech, under Townsend's name, to reflect the new arrangement.

=== Physicist and Terria (1999–2001) ===
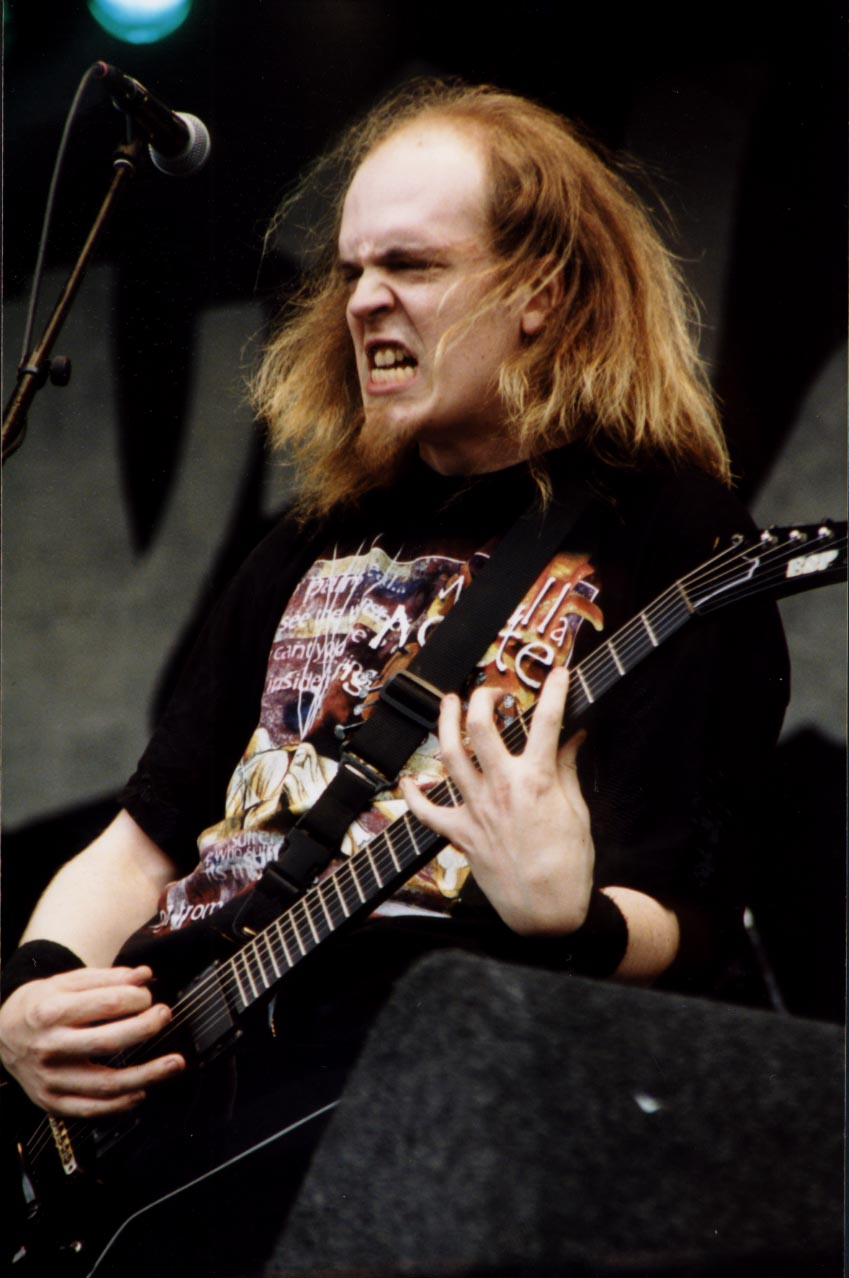
Townsend performing at the Wâldrock Festival, Netherlands (June 30, 2001)

Townsend's next project took several years to come to fruition. After the creation of the IR8 demo tape, Townsend and Jason Newsted had begun work on a new project called Fizzicist, which they described as "heavier than Strapping Young Lad". When the IR8 tape was leaked, Newsted's Metallica bandmates James Hetfield and Lars Ulrich learned of the project. Hetfield was "fucking pissed" that Newsted was playing outside the band, and Newsted was prevented by his bandmates from working on any more side projects, although Townsend would later downplay Metallica's role in Newsted's unavailability. With the project stalled, Townsend instead wrote the album himself, entitling it Physicist. Townsend assembled his Strapping Young Lad bandmates to record it, the only time this lineup was featured on a Devin Townsend album. The thrash-influenced Physicist was released in June 2000, and is generally considered a low point in Townsend's career. Hoglan and the rest of the band were dissatisfied with the way the sound was mixed, and Townsend considers it his worst album to date.

Feeling he had "ostracized a bunch of fans" with Physicist, Townsend felt he had the chance to make a more personal and honest record. Townsend was inspired one morning while driving across Canada with his band, and looked to write an "introspective" album dedicated to his homeland. He produced and recorded Terria, a "highly illustrated stream-of-consciousness" album, with Gene Hoglan on drums, Craig McFarland on bass and Jamie Meyer on keyboards. Townsend cited Ween's White Pepper as an inspiration for the album. Terria was released in November 2001.

=== Strapping Young Lad through Synchestra (2002–2006) ===
Townsend's solo run lasted until 2002. After a five-year break from recording, Strapping Young Lad reunited to record a new album. Townsend credits the album, Strapping Young Lad, as an emotional response to the attacks of September 11, 2001, in the United States. "If the world's about to blow up," said Townsend, "let's write the soundtrack for it." The album's lyrics were based more around fear and insecurity than the "hostile" lyrics of City. Musically, Strapping Young Lad was less industrial than City, and more reminiscent of death metal, with a "larger-than-life" rock production style. Townsend cited Front Line Assembly, Grotus, and Samael's Passage as influences. The self-titled album was released in February 2003. It received lukewarm reviews, with critics finding it inferior to City, but it was the band's first charting album, entering at 97th place on Billboard's Top Heatseekers chart.

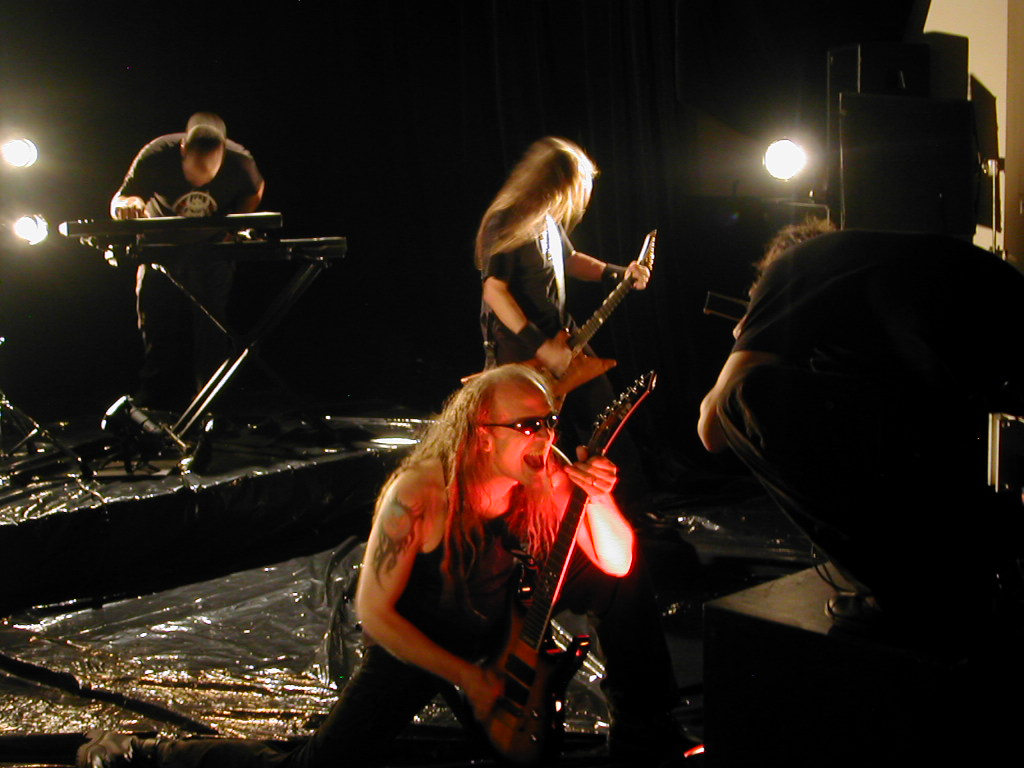
Townsend filming the music video for "Zen" with Strapping Young Lad (2005)

While Strapping Young Lad was being reunited, Townsend formed a new, permanent band "on par with Strapping" to record and tour for his solo releases. The Devin Townsend Band consisted of Brian "Beav" Waddell on guitar, Mike Young on bass, Ryan Van Poederooyen on drums, and Dave Young on keyboards. Townsend performed guitar, vocals, and production, as he did in Strapping Young Lad. Townsend worked on the band's first album, Accelerated Evolution, at the same time he was working on Strapping Young Lad, spending half the week on one and half on the other. Accelerated Evolution, named for the pace of putting a new band together in under a year, was released a month after Strapping Young Lad. Mike G. of Metal Maniacs called it "the album of the year", praising it for "the hard-to-accomplish trick of being extreme yet accessible, simultaneously heavy 'n' rockin' yet majestic and beautiful." Prior to the formation of the Devin Townsend Band, Townsend had represented his solo releases live with the Strapping Young Lad lineup; the band would play one set of Strapping Young Lad songs and one set of Devin Townsend songs. After the release of Accelerated Evolution, Townsend's two bands toured separately for their separate albums.

Strapping Young Lad began working on their next album, Alien, in March 2004. Feeling that the band's previous album did not live up to expectations, Townsend decided to take his music to a new extreme. During the process of writing and recording the new album, Townsend stopped taking the medication prescribed to treat his bipolar disorder because he began expressing doubt about the initial diagnosis, and decided to stop taking the medication, but continued with his substance abuse, and he eventually "flipped out" during the process, and later called the resulting album "toxic" and "psychologically very unhealthy". Although Townsend considered the album an "impenetrable mass of technicality", it was well received on its release, selling 3,697 copies in its first week and appearing on several Billboard charts. Around this time, Townsend also contributed to the soundtrack of the video game Fallout: Brotherhood of Steel.

Shortly thereafter Townsend began putting together the next Devin Townsend Band record, with the working title Human. Townsend intended the album as the more "pleasant" counterpart to Alien. "It's basically a record about coming back down to earth after being in space with Alien for a while." The album ended up being renamed Synchestra and was released in January 2006. Townsend showcased a wide variety of musical styles in Synchestra, blending his trademark "pop metal" with influences from folk, polka, and Middle Eastern music. The final Strapping Young Lad album, The New Black, was released later in 2006.

=== Ziltoid the Omniscient and hiatus (2006–2008) ===
From home, Townsend completed his second solo ambient album, The Hummer, releasing it exclusively on his website in November 2006.

In May 2007, Townsend released Ziltoid the Omniscient, a tongue-in-cheek rock opera about the eponymous fictional alien. This was truly a solo album; he programmed the drums using Toontrack's Drumkit from Hell, a software drum machine that uses samples recorded by Tomas Haake of Meshuggah and played all other instruments himself. Shortly after the album's release, Townsend announced that he no longer planned to tour or make albums with Strapping Young Lad or the Devin Townsend Band. He explained that he was "burnt out on travelling, touring, and self promotion" and wished to do production work, write albums, and spend time with his family without the stress of interviews or touring.

In 2008, Townsend lent his voice to characters in several episodes of the Adult Swim cartoon Metalocalypse (see Musician cameos in Metalocalypse for more). The original character design for Pickles the Drummer, one of the series' main characters, bore a striking resemblance to Townsend. The series' co-creator Brendon Small acknowledged the similarity, and altered the design before the series began. "We made sure he didn't look like Devin Townsend. We gave him the goatee and the dreadover so he wouldn't look like that."

=== Creation of the Devin Townsend Project (2008–2012) ===
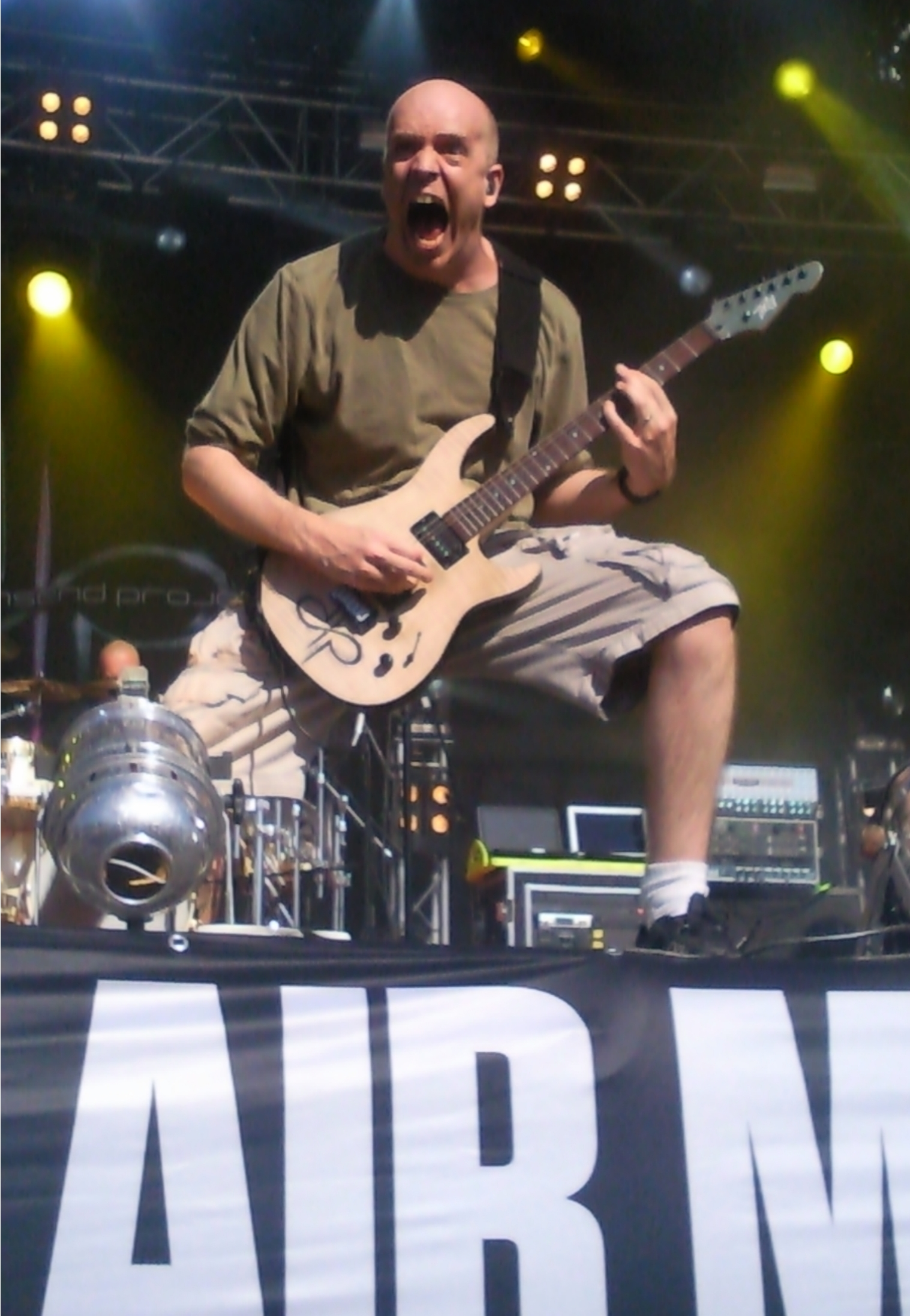
Townsend performing at Tuska Metal Festival, Finland (July 2010)

After removing himself from the music industry, Townsend cut his trademark hair off and gave up drinking and smoking. Townsend found it "disconcerting" that he had difficulty writing music without drugs, and that he had trouble identifying his purpose as a musician. He spent a year producing albums in absence of writing, but found it unrewarding and decided to "pick up the guitar and just write". This began a period of "self discovery" where he learned "how to create without drugs".

Over two years, Townsend wrote over 60 songs, and found that they fit into "four distinct styles". In March 2009, Townsend announced his plans for a four-album series called Devin Townsend Project, with the goal of clarifying his musical identity and being "accountable" for the persona he projects to the public. The project's concept includes a different "theme" and a different group of musicians on each album.

Ki, the first album of the Devin Townsend Project tetralogy was written to "set the stage" for the subsequent albums. Townsend channelled his new-found control and sobriety into Ki, a "tense, quiet" album, which contrasts with much of the music he had been known for. Additional female vocals were provided by Ché Aimee Dorval (Casualties of Cool). Ki was released in May 2009.

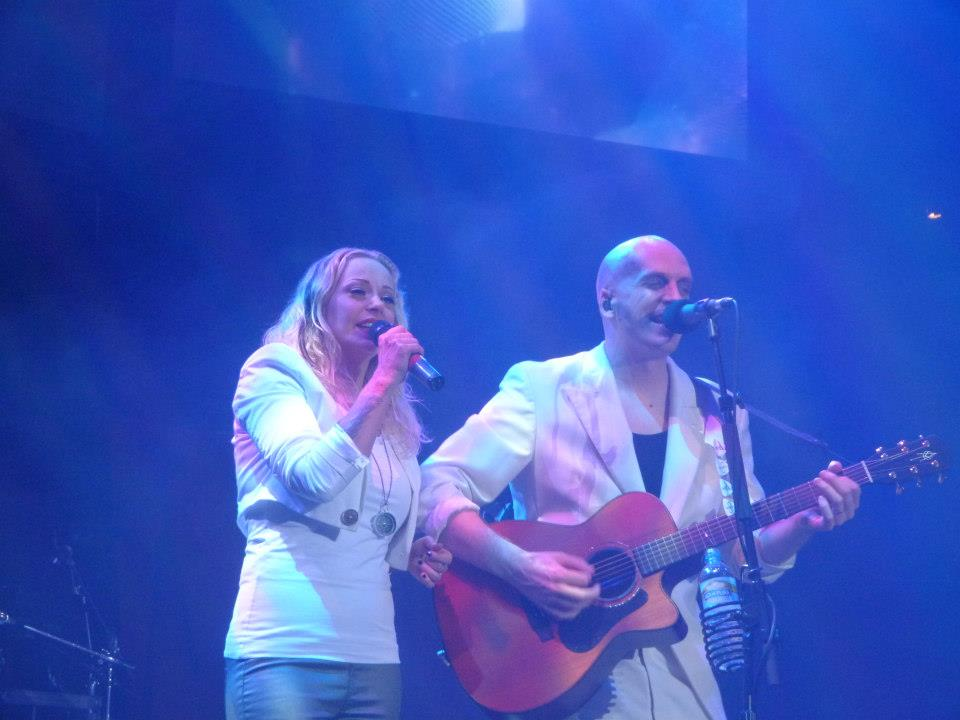
Anneke van Giersbergen and Townsend, live at The Retinal Circus 2012, Roundhouse, London

The second entry, a "commercial, yet heavy" album called Addicted, was released in November 2009 and features lead vocals from Townsend and Dutch singer Anneke van Giersbergen. Brian "Beav" Waddell was recruited from the Devin Townsend Band to play bass.

Townsend returned to the stage in January 2010, touring North America with headliner Between the Buried and Me as well as Cynic and Scale the Summit. This was followed by a headlining tour in Australia and a series of high-profile shows in Europe (for example co-headlining the Brutal Assault festival in Czech Republic). He headlined a North American tour with UK label mates TesseracT supporting, which began in October 2010, and toured in Europe with support from Aeon Zen and Anneke van Giersbergen.

The third and fourth albums in the Devin Townsend Project series, Deconstruction and Ghost, were released simultaneously on June 21, 2011. In December 2011 all four Devin Townsend Project albums with additional material were released as the Contain Us box set. Townsend performed all four of Devin Townsend Project albums in London and recorded them for a DVD box set called By a Thread: Live in London 2011 that was released on June 18, 2012. The first three shows were held at the University of London Union, November 10–12, 2011. Ki, Addicted, and Deconstruction were each performed on one night, respectively. The show for Ghost was held at the Union Chapel, Islington on November 13, 2011. These four shows were each entitled "An Evening with the Devin Townsend Project".

Despite the Devin Townsend Project being originally a four-album series, Townsend decided to continue working under the moniker and released the fifth album, Epicloud on September 18, 2012. Again featuring Anneke van Giersbergen on vocals, Epicloud appeared on several European charts, peaking at number 8 in Finland. On October 27, 2012, Townsend performed a one-off show covering his musical career called The Retinal Circus at Roundhouse in London. The 3-hour performance was recorded in high definition and released on DVD and Blu-ray on September 30, 2013. Also in 2012, Townsend played bass on the debut Bent Sea EP Noistalgia. He also produced the record.

Another project Townsend has mentioned several times between 2009 and 2012 is Obviouser, an album featuring "creepy, bass driven apocalyptic music" created with an "Ampeg rig" and an "Icelandic choir". Working with many projects simultaneously at that time, Townsend stated in 2012 the Obviouser project is vying for pole position until "he wakes up and says 'he wants to do it'".

=== Casualties of Cool and Z^{2} (2012–2014) ===
After Deconstruction and Ghost, Townsend announced a new album, Casualties of Cool, with which he started to work after the release of Epicloud. The album features Ché Aimee Dorval (from Ki) on vocals and Morgan Ågren on drums. Townsend described the album sounds like "haunted Johnny Cash songs" and "late night music", highlighting it will be different than anything he has done before. Townsend referred the music of the album to be "closest to his heart" at this point of his life, and that it is an important and satisfying project he does not want to rush.

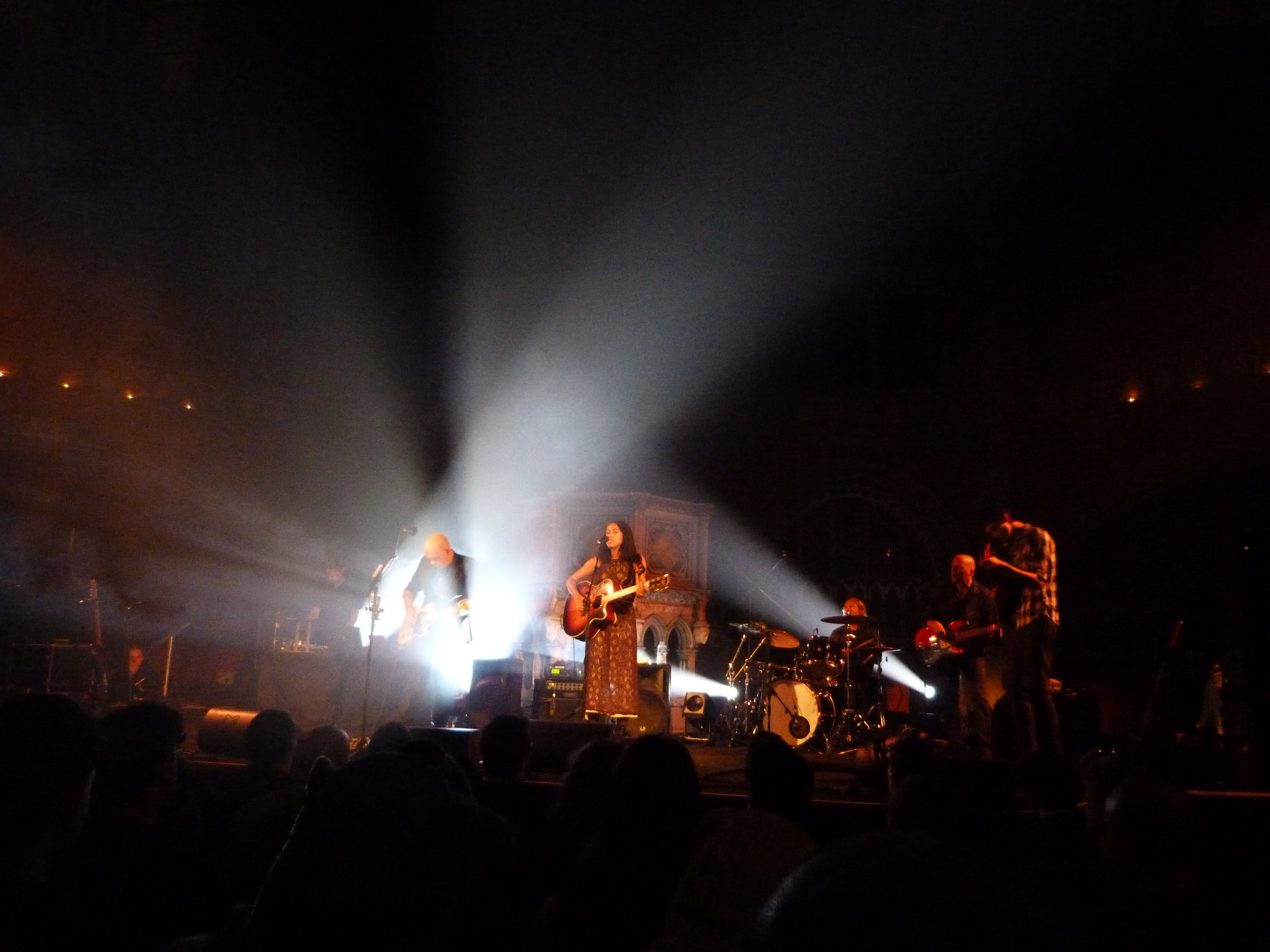
Casualties of Cool live at the Union Chapel, Islington, 2014

The album was completed in November 2013, and a bonus disc was also made for the album, containing the leftover material from the main album as well as songs from Ghost 2, the unreleased compilation of leftover tracks from Ghost. Originally in 2012, Townsend stated that this album will be the sixth and the last album in the Devin Townsend Project series, but he ultimately confirmed that Casualties of Cool is its own project. Townsend also started a crowdfunding campaign through PledgeMusic to support the release of the album. The funding quickly reached its goal, and all additional funds were put directly to Townsend's upcoming projects. Casualties of Cool was released on May 14, 2014. The album was re-issued worldwide on January 15, 2016, containing an additional DVD with live footage from the 2014 concert at the Union Chapel in London.

From 2009, Townsend worked on a long-running album project called Z^{2}, a sequel to the album Ziltoid the Omniscient (2007). Originally in 2012, he teased he "may have just written the heaviest thing (he's) ever done" for the album, and stated there might a surprising lack of Ziltoid himself appearing on the album. However, in August 2013, a London-based radio station, TeamRock Radio, aired the first episode of Ziltoid Radio, a satirical radio show hosted solely by Ziltoid, this being one element of the Z^{2} project. Townsend also discussed a "ZTV" or "Ziltoid TV" to precede the album. Townsend later stated he found the project hard to schedule and work with amidst touring and writing, stating "it takes a lot of effort" to keep the content and its tongue-in-cheek humour entertaining.

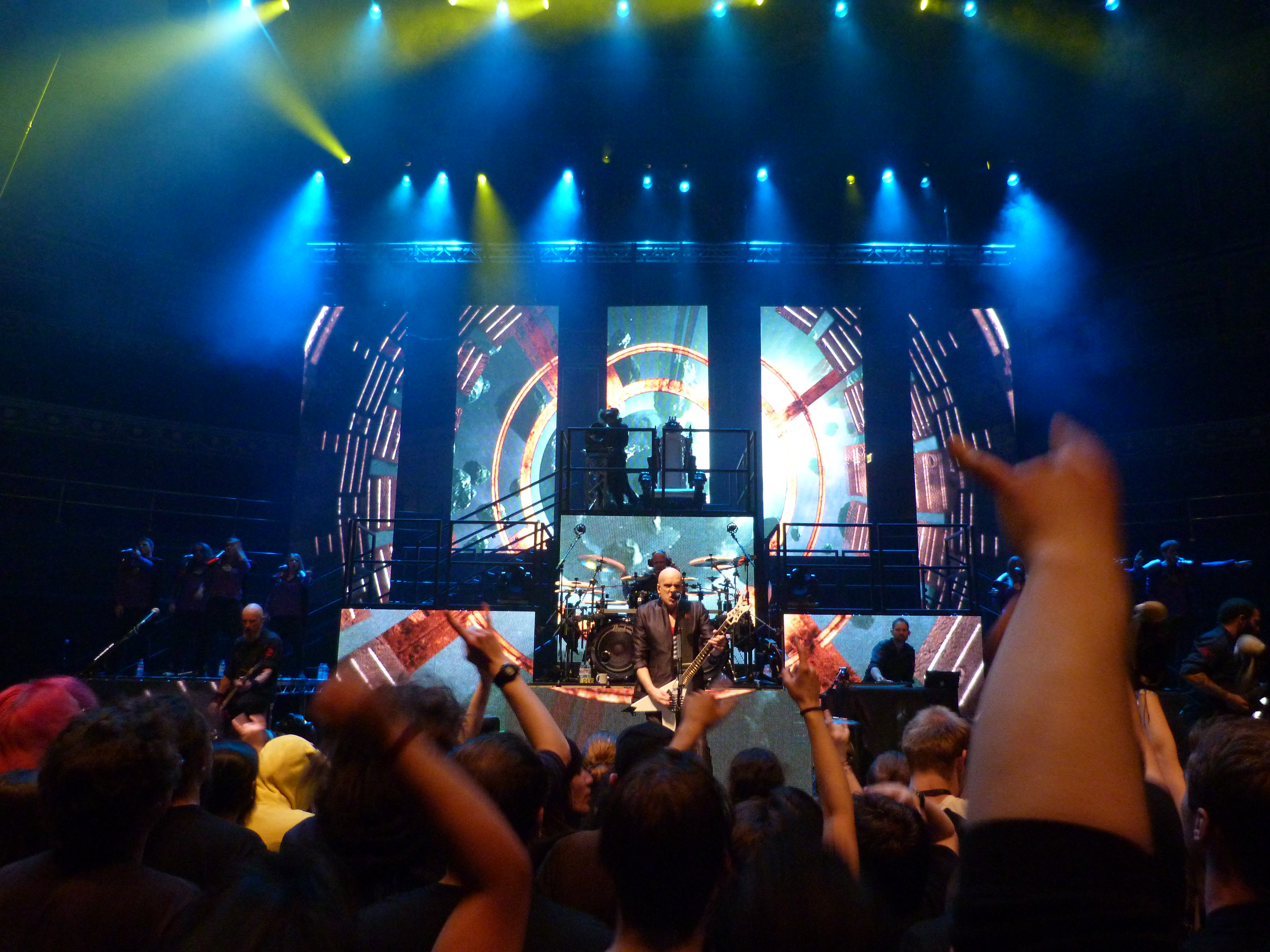
Devin Townsend Project live at the Royal Albert Hall 2015

After writing ideas for over 70 songs, Townsend stated he would finally finish the whole project, followed by the announcement the album would be released on October 27, 2014. The recording process started in May 2014, and the final project includes the album, a Ziltoid TV program and a live show, with a "big graphic novel comic" and a documentary. The album itself is a double album, with disc one featuring Devin Townsend Project material and disc two containing the main album. According to Townsend, the album's theme is "Ziltoid against the world". The Devin Townsend Project disc is called Sky Blue and the Ziltoid disc is called Dark Matters.

After finishing the album, Townsend stated the project was "punishing" and an "absolute nightmare to complete" due to amount of material against tight schedules. He also described the hardship of the project by telling "if he was ever going to start drinking [again], the last months would have been it", but now "he's starting to get excited again". Later, "after the chaos of finishing it had subsided", Townsend stated he is really satisfied with the result.

Townsend recently discussed at least a year-long hiatus, beginning after the Z^{2} show taking place at the Royal Albert Hall on April 13, 2015. During the indefinitely long break Townsend intends to "recharge his batteries", "get some inspiration and experiences" and to "see what the next chapter holds" for him.

=== Transcendence (2014–2017) ===
In 2014, Townsend recorded a poppy-sounding song in Los Angeles with producer Brian Howes, but has decided against releasing. Townsend mentioned that he is against the project being contrived due to the current hard rock undertones in popular music. He described it as a "lukewarm heavy metal Devin song". On December 11, 2015, Townsend announced via Twitter that he was recording vocals for a song by Steve Vai.

In early 2016, Townsend completed the seventh DTP album, entitled Transcendence at Armoury Studios in Vancouver. The album was released on September 9. On March 17, 2017, Devin Townsend Project played Ocean Machine live in its entirety at Hammersmith Apollo. On October 30, 2017, Devin announced that he was working on four new albums.

=== Break from Devin Townsend Project, Empath (2018–2020) ===
On January 31, 2018, Townsend announced on his Facebook page that he was taking a break from the Devin Townsend Project and focusing on a number of other projects, including the four new albums previously announced.

On January 15, 2019, Townsend announced his album, Empath, on which work had been completed, and slated for release on March 29, 2019. The album's purpose is "to see what would happen if all the styles that make up [Townsend's] current interests were finally represented in one place.", and about "allowing the audience a feeling for a variety of musical emotions. The musical dynamics represented on this single album are broad, challenging, and immense. To approach this sort of work with a long history of what makes heavy music 'heavy', allows this to be done with a type of power rarely heard." Guests on the album include former Frank Zappa collaborators Mike Keneally, Morgan Ågren and Steve Vai, as well as Samus Paulicelli, Chad Kroeger, Anneke Van Giersbergen, Ché Aimee Dorval from Casualties of Cool, and Ryan Dahle. A series of documentary videos detailing the making of Empath has been released on YouTube. He appeared on the YouTube show Tuesday Talks hosted by Mary Spender. In 2020, Townsend further discussed the technical aspects of the album when he appeared on the Nail the Mix music-production platform to provide a detailed breakdown of his mixing process for the song “Genesis”.

On March 12, 2020, Townsend postponed the remainder of his Empath Vol. 1 North American Tour due to the COVID-19 pandemic. Four days later, on March 16, 2020, Townsend launched a crowdfunding campaign to cover the costs of the canceled tour. It raised $80,804 of the $50,000 goal. As a "thank you" to his fans, Townsend launched what he dubbed "Quarantine Project", releasing new music in the process. Among the new tracks is a new mix of "A New Reign" from the Sky Blue album. Townsend collaborated with the likes of Kat Epple, Samus Paulicelli, Morgan Ågren, Federico Paulovich, Ché Aimee Dorval, Mattias Eklundh, Wes Hauch and Liam Wilson.

=== The Puzzle, Snuggles and Lightwork (2020–2023) ===
In April 2020, Townsend began uploading a chronological series of podcasts on his official YouTube channel, with each episode discussing one or two of the albums in his discography. These podcasts have been monologue discussions and reflections on the albums themselves, the influences, the personnel, and the state of Townsend's life during the times these albums were being written and recorded.

In August 2020, Townsend announced the upcoming release of Empath Live Volume 1: Order of Magnitude, a live concert recorded during the first Empath Tour, and Empath Live Volume 2: By Request, a virtual concert for fans in lieu of the second tour, which was canceled due to the COVID-19 pandemic. On September 5, he hosted a streaming premiere of Empath Live Volume 2, a prerecorded virtual show featuring Samus Paulicelli on drums, Wes Hauch on guitar, Liam Wilson on bass, and Townsend on guitar and vocals. Each of them performed separately in front of green screens, with eight different camera setups each, to enhance the virtual concert experience. In 2021, he released two live albums: Devolution Series #1 - Acoustically Inclined, Live in Leeds, which was a recording of an acoustic show in Leeds in 2019, released on March 19 and Devolution Series #2 – Galactic Quarantine which was a recording of the aforementioned virtual show, released on June 25.

Townsend's next project was a double release including the albums The Puzzle and Snuggles. The two albums were released on 3 December 2021, after two release delays "due to a massive shortage in raw materials and plastics, preventing the physical releases, particularly the boxsets and vinyls, from getting completed and shipped out in time.". The Puzzle is based on the chaotic experience of the 2020 pandemic while Snuggles is said to be more calm; both albums are "collaborative multimedia art projects" accompanied by films and, in the case of The Puzzle, a graphic novel. These were followed by another solo album in 2022 called Lightwork. A tour in support of Lightwork was announced with dates in April–May 2022. Ultimately, Townsend cancelled his solo tour dates in favour of opening for American progressive metal band Dream Theater's European Tour in early 2022. with his Lightwork tour being postponed until early 2023.

On October 16, 2023, via Inside Out Music's YouTube channel, Townsend announced a new podcast series by publishing its first episode. The podcast was to be published monthly via the same channel. Based on the first episode, as well as Townsend's Instagram, the new series' aim was, as opposed to the original Devin Townsend Podcast series (published on Townsend's YouTube channel), not to analyze his past records, but rather to "focus on a real time observation of the next ones."

=== The "Moth Quadrilogy": PowerNerd, The Moth, Axolotl, Ruby Quaker (2023–present) ===
On August 23, a new song and video was released called PowerNerd, which was included on a new studio album of the same name that was released on October 25, 2024. His rock opera The Moth was performed live at De Oosterpoort in Groningen, Netherlands on March 27 and March 28, 2025; the project has been in the works since at least 2017. He is also currently working on a number of other projects, including one called Axolotl, and a web series called Ruby Quaker. The four albums form a quadrilogy that Townsend explained to center around the idea of change.

Townsend began a year long hiatus from touring after the North American tour in support of PowerNerd had concluded, before announcing a solo tour titled "Metamorphosis" on May 5, 2026. The tour will feature music from across his discography, taking place on select dates in September and October across Europe. The album version of The Moth was released on May 29, 2026, with the announcement coinciding with the release its first single, "Enter the City", on April 11, 2026.

== Personal life ==
Townsend began dating Tracy Turner when he was 19, and was married to her until 2024. She gave birth to their son in October 2006. As of 2026, Townsend lives in a small cabin in the suburbs of Vancouver.

Townsend has been a vegetarian for ethical reasons since around the early 1990s, but does not consider himself an activist. He has revealed in interviews that he has depression. He was diagnosed with bipolar disorder around 1998, a condition that was unknowingly exacerbated by his alcohol and drug use at the time; he has been sober and free of anti-psychotic medication since 2007.

== Musical style ==
=== Projects ===
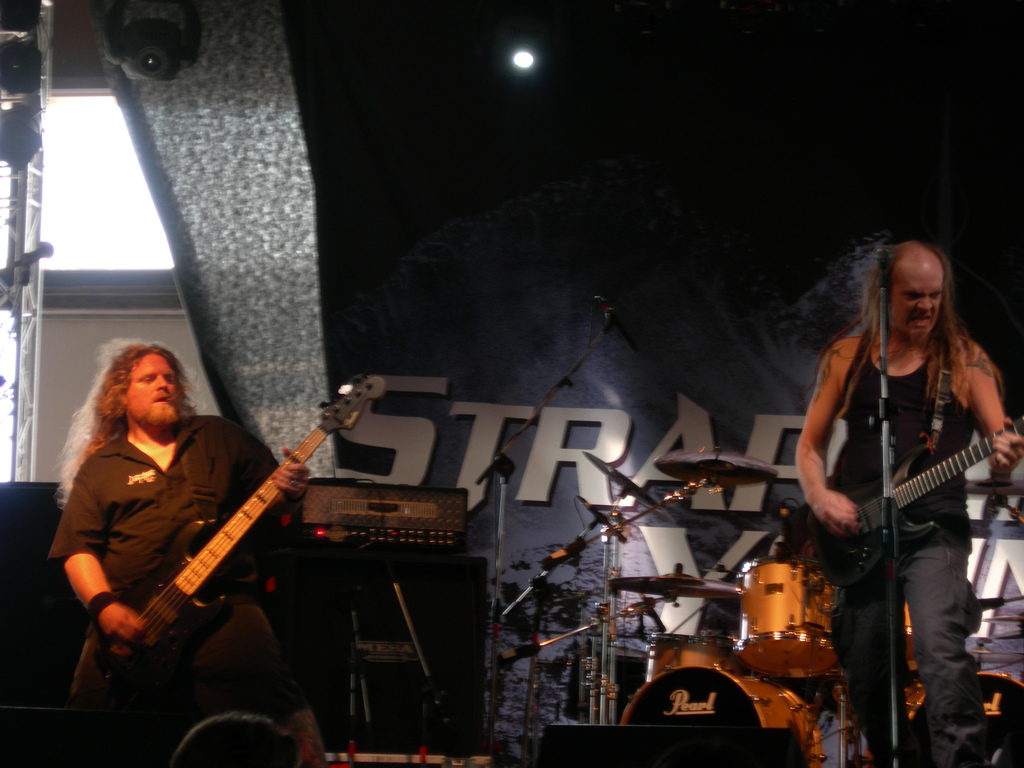
Townsend (right) performing with Strapping Young Lad in Bologna, Italy (2006)

Townsend designed his two main projects, the aggressive Strapping Young Lad and his more melodic solo material, as counterparts. Strapping Young Lad's music was a diverse mix of extreme metal genres: death metal, thrash metal, black metal and industrial metal. Townsend's solo material blends many genres and influences, with elements of atmospheric ambient music, hard rock and prog rock, along with glam metal and arena rock. He described it as "a highly orchestrated type of expansive music based in hard rock and heavy metal. Dense and produced with a large amount of ambient elements." Despite Strapping Young Lad's greater mainstream acceptance, Townsend identifies more with his solo material, and has never intended Strapping Young Lad to be the focus of his music.

=== Production style ===
Townsend is synesthetic, experiencing musical notes as colors and shapes. Partly due to this, he simultaneously composes and mixes his music in what he describes as "all autopilot", practically without any deliberate application of music theory. As a self-proclaimed "fan of multitracking", Townsend has developed a trademark production style featuring an atmospheric, layered "wall of sound". Townsend has drawn critical praise for his productions, which "are always marked by a sense of adventure, intrigue, chaotic atmospherics and overall aural pyrotechnics", according to Mike G. of Metal Maniacs. Townsend mainly uses Pro Tools to produce his music, alongside other software suites such as Steinberg Cubase, Ableton Live, Logic Pro and Waves Audio plugins. Townsend's musical ideas and production style have drawn comparisons to Phil Spector and Frank Zappa. Townsend has carried out the mixing and mastering for most of his solo work himself.

Townsend has also mixed and remixed work for other artists such as Rammstein, August Burns Red, Pendulum and Misery Signals. In 2024 he co-produced the album II: Frailty by the Chinese progressive metal band OU.

=== Playing style ===
Townsend mainly uses Open C tuning for both six and seven string guitar. He now also uses Open B tuning and Open B flat tuning on his six string guitars. Townsend's technique varies from fingerpicking, power chords and polychords to sweep-picked arpeggios and tapping techniques. He is also known for his heavy use of reverb and delay effects. He has expressed that he has no taste for shred guitar, saying that "Musically it doesn't do anything for me" and that he only solos when he thinks that he can within the context of the song.

=== Vocals ===
Townsend employs a variety of vocal techniques in his work, including screaming, growling or even falsetto. Daniel Lake of Decibel Magazine classifies Townsend's voice as a "semi-operatic tenor".

=== Influences ===
Townsend draws influence from a wide range of music genres. Townsend has cited, among others, Judas Priest, W.A.S.P., Broadway musicals, ABBA, new-age music, Zoviet France, King's X, Morbid Angel, Barkmarket, Grotus, Jane's Addiction, Fear Factory and Godflesh as his influences, and has also expressed his admiration for Meshuggah on several occasions, calling them "the best metal band on the planet". Townsend lists Paul Horn and Ravi Shankar as the "two most important musicians in his life". The two songs that Townsend credits with changing the way he thought about music are "The Burning Down" by King's X, and "Up the Beach" by Jane's Addiction. City was influenced by New York noise rock bands such as Foetus and Cop Shoot Cop, and The New Black's influences were Meshuggah, and "more traditional metal" like Metallica. He is also influenced by orchestral and classical composers such as John Williams, Trevor Jones and Igor Stravinsky.

== Discography ==
=== Steve Vai ===
- Sex & Religion (1993)

=== Punky Brüster ===
- Cooked on Phonics (1996)

=== Strapping Young Lad ===
- Heavy as a Really Heavy Thing (1995)
- City (1997)
- Strapping Young Lad (2003)
- Alien (2005)
- The New Black (2006)

=== Solo albums ===
- Ocean Machine: Biomech (1997)
- Infinity (1998)
- Physicist (2000)
- Terria (2001)
- Devlab (2004)
- The Hummer (2006)
- Ziltoid the Omniscient (2007)
- Empath (2019)
- The Puzzle (2021)
- Snuggles (2021)
- Lightwork (2022)
- PowerNerd (2024)
- The Moth (2026)

=== Devin Townsend Project ===
- Ki (2009)
- Addicted (2009)
- Deconstruction (2011)
- Ghost (2011)
- Epicloud (2012)
- Z^{2}: Sky Blue (2014)
- Z^{2}: Dark Matters (2014)
- Transcendence (2016)

=== The Devin Townsend Band ===
- Accelerated Evolution (2003)
- Synchestra (2006)

=== Casualties of Cool ===
- Casualties of Cool (2014)

== Equipment ==
Townsend played ESP six and seven-string guitars from 1994 to 2009 during his endorsement with ESP. In the early days of Strapping Young Lad, he was seen playing an ESP Flying V-style 6-string with a single EMG 81 pickup and a custom graphic designed by Townsend. This was the guitar that was used during the shows in support of Heavy as a Really Heavy Thing, and the shows in support of City. In addition to this guitar, Townsend also utilized an ESP EXP Explorer-style guitar with two EMG 81 pickups. During the late 1990s and the 2000s, he was also seen with two ESP Telecaster models (one white, one black) with EMG 81 pickups, which were used for the majority of his six-string material. Townsend also utilized two ESP Custom Shop Horizon 7-string guitars with a 27" baritone scale and EMG 81-7 pickups, which closely resembled ESP's Stephen Carpenter signature model. He has also been seen with the Stephen Carpenter SC-607 and SC-607B. He was also occasionally seen playing what is believed to be a Fender American Deluxe Stratocaster HSS during Accelerated Evolution and Synchestra-era shows (mainly for performing "Deadhead"). At the time, this was the only guitar Devin Townsend was seen with that did not have EMG pickups, but was modified with a Seymour Duncan STK-S2n Hot Stack in the neck.

After returning to public view in 2009, Townsend began endorsing Peavey, and later released a PXD Devin Townsend signature model, essentially a Flying V-style 7-string baritone guitar with an EMG 81-7 pickup and a 7-string EMG SA single coil pickup in the neck position. Peavey also made Townsend a number of custom 7-strings, including one with a single EMG 81-7 pickup that is used for playing most of the material on Ziltoid The Omniscient. Aside from his signature model, Townsend also utilizes two custom 6-string Predator models made by Peavey; one with a natural flame-top finish and the DTP logo on the 12th fret, and one in a black finish with a Floyd Rose vibrato unit (for Open C and Open B tuning, respectively).

In 2012, Townsend announced that he was using other guitars besides his Peavey models, including two Sadowsky Telecaster models and a number of Framus semi-hollow body guitars. In regard to this, Townsend stated on HeavyBlogIsHeavy.com: "The Peavey situation was intense and a real eye opener in terms of how things REALLY work in the business side of endorsements, and I can't say I really enjoyed it, but we got the guitar out and everyone is nice to each other so all good... I really like that V. However, I decided to use other guitars for other stuff as well, a Sadowsky Tele set, a Framus hollowbody group of guitars, and the V's. No one is entirely happy with that decision, but I find it difficult to not be straight up with folks about what I want to play and do and have typically pissed people off as a result... The bottom line though is I like what I like and it is important to the music to be accurate with tones and vibe. The guitars I actually play, I really like, regardless of brand."

For Strapping Young Lad and solo projects from 1996 – 2004, Townsend mainly used the Peavey 5150 head, with Mesa/Boogie and Marshall 4x12 cabinets, for his main sounds. Around 2005, Townsend began to utilize Mesa/Boogie Dual Rectifier and Stiletto amp heads, boosted with a Maxon OD808, running into Mesa/Boogie 2x12 cabinets, and Marshall 4x12 cabinets. He would also run a 3rd signal into a 1990s Roland GP-100, which would be amplified by a Mesa/Boogie tube power amp. He would still make use of the Peavey head for some solo recordings, such as Synchestra. He switched to a Fractal Audio AxeFx system in 2010, replacing his entire Mesa/Boogie and Marshall rig. He has been through a number of outboard modules that were mainly used for echo/reverb effects, something that Townsend is known for as a part of his signature sound. One of his favorites is the Roland GP-100, a unit that Townsend still uses along with his Fractal units. He also used a TC Electronic G-Force in tandem with his Mesa/Boogie rig. Townsend also utilizes D'Addario Strings (.010-.052 and .010-.060) and Planet Waves Custom Series cables.

As of 2014, he reintroduced the Dual Rectifier into his rig using a wet-dry-wet setup with the Dual Rectifier being the center dry sound and the AxeFx being the stereo effected sounds using the model of the Dual Rectifier as a basis. In 2015, for live shows, the Dual Rectifier was replaced with a Kemper Profiler Amplifier, and the Roland GP-100 was retired in favor of effects in the Fractal Axe-FX.

At the 2016 NAMM Show, Townsend introduced a signature set of Fishman pickups in the Fluence line and a signature Framus guitar that features an original body shapes, the Fishman pickups and the Evertune Bridge.

In November 2017, Townsend posted to social media and forums that his equipment list had been reduced, explaining how he had eliminated a number of pieces of equipment from his setup. He wrote, "I was working with many amp companies, but I have made my choice and have settled on a single Axe Fx 2XL+ for my ENTIRE chain. I use Framus Guitars, Fishman Pickups, D'Addario strings, Fractal Axe Fx. One Rig to rule them all =)"

In 2018 Mooer released the Devin Townsend signature Ocean Machine pedal, featuring twin delays, reverb and looper with infinite feedback in a genuine collaboration which Townsend enthusiastically recommended. The relatively unusual pedal design was received well, with 5 star reviews.

In 2023, Devin paired with guitar pick maker Acoustik Attak to release his signature Devin Townsend "Earthtone" pick.

== Band members ==
=== Members of recent touring band ===
- Devin Townsend – guitars, lead vocals, theremin, keyboards
- Mike Keneally – guitars, keyboards, backing vocals (2019–2020, 2023–present)
- James Leach – bass (2021–present)
- Darby Todd – drums (2021–present)
