= The Moth (Devin Townsend album) =

2026 album by Devin Townsend

- The Moth cover

Studio album by Devin Townsend
- Released: May 29, 2026
- Studios: Lighthouse (Canada); Dongxt Studios (China); Strictly Creative Song Laboratory (Netherlands); De Oosterpoort (Netherlands); RAK Studios (UK); Top Floor Studios (Sweden)
- Genres: Symphonic metal; progressive metal
- Length: 69:53
- Labels: HevyDevy, InsideOut Music
- Producer: Devin Townsend

Devin Townsend chronology
PowerNerd (2024)	The Moth (2026)

Singles from The Moth
- 1. "Enter the City" Released: March 11, 2026; 2. "Home at Night" Released: April 21, 2026; 3. "Prepare for War / The Big Snit" Released: May 18, 2026

The Moth is the twenty-third studio album by Canadian metal musician Devin Townsend. Conceived around 2017, it underwent various revisions over the following decade until eventually premiering at a live show on March 27 and 28, 2025 at De Oosterpoort in Groningen, Netherlands. The full album was released a little over a year later on May 29, 2026, on Inside Out Music and HevyDevy Records. The Moth has been described by Townsend as his "life's work", and received a positive critical reception upon release.

== Background ==
The initial concept for The Moth began when Devin Townsend became interested in creating a "modern opera" similar to the musicals he had seen in his youth, such as Jesus Christ Superstar, Phantom of the Opera, and Paint Your Wagon. The Moth was first teased in 2017, with Townsend describing it in an interview with Vice as being a $10 million symphony with "cocks and vaginas and death". Townsend also reported that he was collaborating with an orchestrator who had worked on the film Slumdog Millionaire and with director Steven Spielberg. As part of the preparation for The Moth, Townsend reportedly took lessons in music theory and composing, which he initially found frustrating.

Additional logistical and financial issues hindered the production of The Moth for years, delaying it until Townsend put together his own independent backing to fund the project. He was eventually approached by the head of the Noord Nederlands Orkest who offered to help him orchestrate The Moth. During this time, The Moth underwent changes from its initial conception as solely a live show to being a part of a trilogy of albums that began with the release of PowerNerd in 2024. Conceptually, the album became less of what Townsend described as an "obscene thing" after he realized it could yield "unbelievably intense things" musically.

After The Moth premiered live in March 2025, Townsend announced that once the tour in support of PowerNerd concluded later that year, he would start an extended touring hiatus. A desire to finish the studio version of The Moth uninterrupted, along with burnout, were cited as the chief reasons for his decision. This hiatus ended with his announcement of the "Metamorphosis" tour, which was inspired by Townsend's desire to "celebrate [his] entire anthology of music across a variety of projects" in the light of the completion of The Moth.

== Release ==
The Moth was premiered through a live show at De Oosterpoort in Groningen, Netherlands on March 27 and 28, 2025. A livestream of the second night was also made available for a limited time. The livestream and show was praised for its impressive sound quality and lineup consisting of a full orchestra and choir, though criticism was levied at its use of AI generated visuals. The orchestra was conducted by Jukka Iisakkila, who performed alongside Townsend, guitarists Mike Keneally and Pete Rinaldi, bassist James Leach, drummer Darby Todd, and vocalist Lynn Wu, most of whom would go on to perform on the album version of The Moth as well.

On March 11, 2026, the first single, "Enter the City", was released alongside an announcement that the album's release date would be May 29, 2026. The music video for "Enter the City" was animated by Studio Sparks, depicting an early section of the album through diverse imagery. After the release of this single, Townsend announced that the deluxe edition of The Moth would include new renditions of each song, with "only choir and orchestra" present, subtitled "The Afterlife". The album's following single was released April 21, 2026, titled "Home at Night", and was accompanied by a video produced by Mike Zimmer featuring Townsend, which Townsend described as containing "a healthy dose of the 'trolololo guy' aesthetic". On May 18, 2026, the double single "Prepare for War / The Big Snit" was released digitally: Cervanté Pope of Metal Injection noted that this "lean[ed] into the theatrical nature of the project as a whole". A music video for both songs was released as well, featuring a second animation by Studio Sparks.

== Style and composition ==
The Moth has been described as an orchestral rock and metal fusion, with its symphonic elements being noticeably more prominent within the work than they have been in Townsend's prior projects. Reviewers likened the album to a film score, highlighting its theatricality, and others compared elements of it to other conceptual progressive rock albums such as Pink Floyd's The Wall. Some reviewers also drew comparisons to Disney musicals like those of Alan Menken.

The structure of the album has also been discussed, with James MacKinnon from Kerrang! noting that the album flows "seamlessly from heady orchestral pomp, through gentle choral pieces to heavy metal firepower", and Thomas Mendes from Everything is Noise concluding that "the albums structure is more about movements and sections than it is about 'songs' in the traditional sense".

== Critical reception ==
Professional ratings
Review scores
Source	Rating
Blabbermouth.net	8/10
Boolin Tunes	9/10
Chaoszine	4/5
Kerrang!	4/5 stars
Metal Planet Music	10/10
Noizze	9/10
Rock N' Load Magazine	9/10

The Moth received highly positive critical reviews upon release. James MacKinon writing for Kerrang! described it as "a brilliantly bonkers work", praising how the album balanced its various orchestral and metal elements. Several reviewers praised the depth and complexity of the work, with Rick Eaglestone from Metal Planet Music and Pete Rogers from The Progressive Aspect both calling the album a "masterwork", applauding its ambition, vision, technical skill, and emotional resonance. Simmaco Munno from Chaoszine praised the re-listenability of the record, writing that the album "is a journey that rewards careful listening (...) allowing the listener to absorb every nuance, texture, and detail hidden within the songs." Kieran White writing for Boolin Tunes emphasized Townsend's signature "wall-of-sound" production on the album, writing that it was "mastered and executed with perfect precision" on The Moth, which Eaglestone agreed with, calling the production "a career's worth of lessons in how to make enormity feel personal". However, despite having a generally positive impression of The Moth, Luke Nuttall of The Soundboard Reviews noted that The Moth was "huge and epic in a way that achieves more from its intent, rather than what it does as an album," adding that, "The Moth can feel as though it's trying to keep itself propped up".

== Track listing ==
All lyrics are written by Devin Townsend, except where noted.

The Moth
No.	Title	Music	Length
1.	"Semi-prologue"	Devin Townsend; Joseph Stevenson	2:52
2.	"War Beyond Words"	Townsend; Stevenson	3:57
3.	"The Moth"	Townsend; Stevenson	1:46
4.	"Ode to My Eye"	Townsend; Stevenson	0:57
5.	"Enter the City"	Townsend	2:34
6.	"Covered by Causes" (Townsend/Lynn Wu)	Townsend	8:05
7.	"Lexin"	Townsend	4:16
8.	"Runaways"	Townsend; Stevenson	0:49
9.	"A Proxy for God"	Townsend	1:27
10.	"The Mothers"	Townsend; Stevenson	1:55
11.	"Orion"	Townsend; Stevenson	5:48
12.	"Stay There"	Townsend; Stevenson	2:25
13.	"Home at Night"	Townsend	5:15
14.	"Intermission"	Townsend; Steve Vai	4:55
15.	"Lexin Returns"	Townsend; Stevenson	0:48
16.	"The Clergy" (Townsend/Wu)	Townsend; Stevenson	1:06
17.	"Prepare for War"	Townsend; Stevenson	4:44
18.	"The Big Snit"	Townsend; Stevenson	2:36
19.	"Silver Princess"	Townsend; Stevenson	2:50
20.	"A Life in Review"	Townsend	1:29
21.	"Metamorphosis"	Townsend; Stevenson	2:10
22.	"Stained Hearts"	Townsend	3:58
23.	"Let Go"	Townsend	1:38
24.	"We Don't Deserve Dogs" (Townsend/Wu)	Townsend	1:39
Total length:			69:53

The Moth Deluxe Edition - The Afterlife
No.	Title	Music	Length
25.	"Semi-prologue"	Townsend; Stevenson	2:51
26.	"War Beyond Words"	Townsend; Stevenson	3:32
27.	"The Moth"	Townsend; Stevenson	2:06
28.	"Ode to My Eye"	Townsend; Stevenson	0:58
29.	"Enter the City"	Townsend	2:34
30.	"Covered by Causes"	Townsend	8:02
31.	"Lexin"	Townsend	4:04
32.	"Runaways"	Townsend; Stevenson	0:49
33.	"A Proxy for God"	Townsend	1:27
34.	"The Mothers"	Townsend; Stevenson	1:57
35.	"Orion"	Townsend; Stevenson	5:59
36.	"Stay There"	Townsend; Stevenson	2:26
37.	"Home at Night"	Townsend	5:14
38.	"Intermission"	Townsend; Vai	4:55
39.	"Lexin Returns"	Townsend; Stevenson	0:47
40.	"The Clergy"	Townsend; Stevenson	1:06
41.	"Prepare for War"	Townsend; Stevenson	4:44
42.	"The Big Snit"	Townsend; Stevenson	2:35
43.	"Silver Princess"	Townsend; Stevenson	2:52
44.	"A Life in Review"	Townsend	1:30
45.	"Metamorphosis"	Townsend; Stevenson	2:12
46.	"Stained Hearts"	Townsend	3:57
47.	"Let Go"	Townsend	1:42
48.	"We Don't Deserve Dogs"	Townsend	1:50
Total length:			70:24

== Personnel ==
Band

- Devin Townsend - Vocals, guitars, synths, programming
- Lynn Wu - Vocals
- Anneke van Giersbergen - Vocals
- Darby Todd - Drums
- Mike Keneally - Guitar, additional keyboards
- James Leach - Bass
- Josh Searles - Classical guitar on "The Afterlife"
- Morgan Ågren - Additional drums
- Aman Kohsla - Additional guitars
- Ben Searles - Additional synths and programming

Technical

- Devin Townsend - Producer, engineering, mixing
- Chris Edrich - Mixing, FOH engineering, additional drum engineering
- Naaman McKinley - Additional engineering
- Francis Natoc -Additional engineering
- Ron Searles - Additional recording engineer, Dolby Atmos mixing
- Jakob Herrmann - Drum recording engineer, additional photography
- Anthony Vanacore - Engineering for Lynn Wu
- Ted Masseurs- Orchestra FOH engineering
- Stef Polderman - Orchestra monitor engineering
- Will Purton - Choir engineering
- Rob van der Meijs - Communication, audio plans
- Vincent Bezault - Monitor engineering
- Ben Searles - Playback technician, additional drum engineering
- Troy Glessner - Mastering
- Eliran Kantor - Artwork
- Travis Smith - Layout and logos
- Gareth Jarvis - Cover photography

North Netherlands Orchestra & North Netherlands Concert Choir

- Jukka Iisakkila - Conductor
- Tom Kelly - Orchestrator, choir musical director
- Joshua Hickin - Additional orchestration
- Niels Bye Nielsen - Additional arrangement on "Home at Night"
- Leender Runia - Choirmaster
- Erik Steverinson - Choral arrangements
- Jasper Schuurmans - Project coordinator
- Marcel Mandos - NNO Artistic director
- Jasper Berben - NNO Teamleader

== Charts ==
Chart performance for The Moth
Chart (2026)	Peak position
Australian Albums (ARIA)	36
Austrian Albums (Ö3 Austria)	24
Belgian Albums (Ultratop Flanders)	121
Belgian Albums (Ultratop Wallonia)	49
Dutch Albums (Album Top 100)	89
Finnish Albums (Suomen virallinen lista)	6
French Albums (SNEP)	147
French Rock & Metal Albums (SNEP)	7
German Albums (Offizielle Top 100)	15
German Rock & Metal Albums (Offizielle Top 100)	5
Scottish Albums (Official Charts)	11
Swiss Albums (Schweizer Hitparade)	18
UK Albums (Official Charts)	83
UK Rock & Metal Albums (Official Charts)	2
US Top Album Sales (Billboard)	47
