= Tina Ahlin =

Swedish composer, pianist and singer

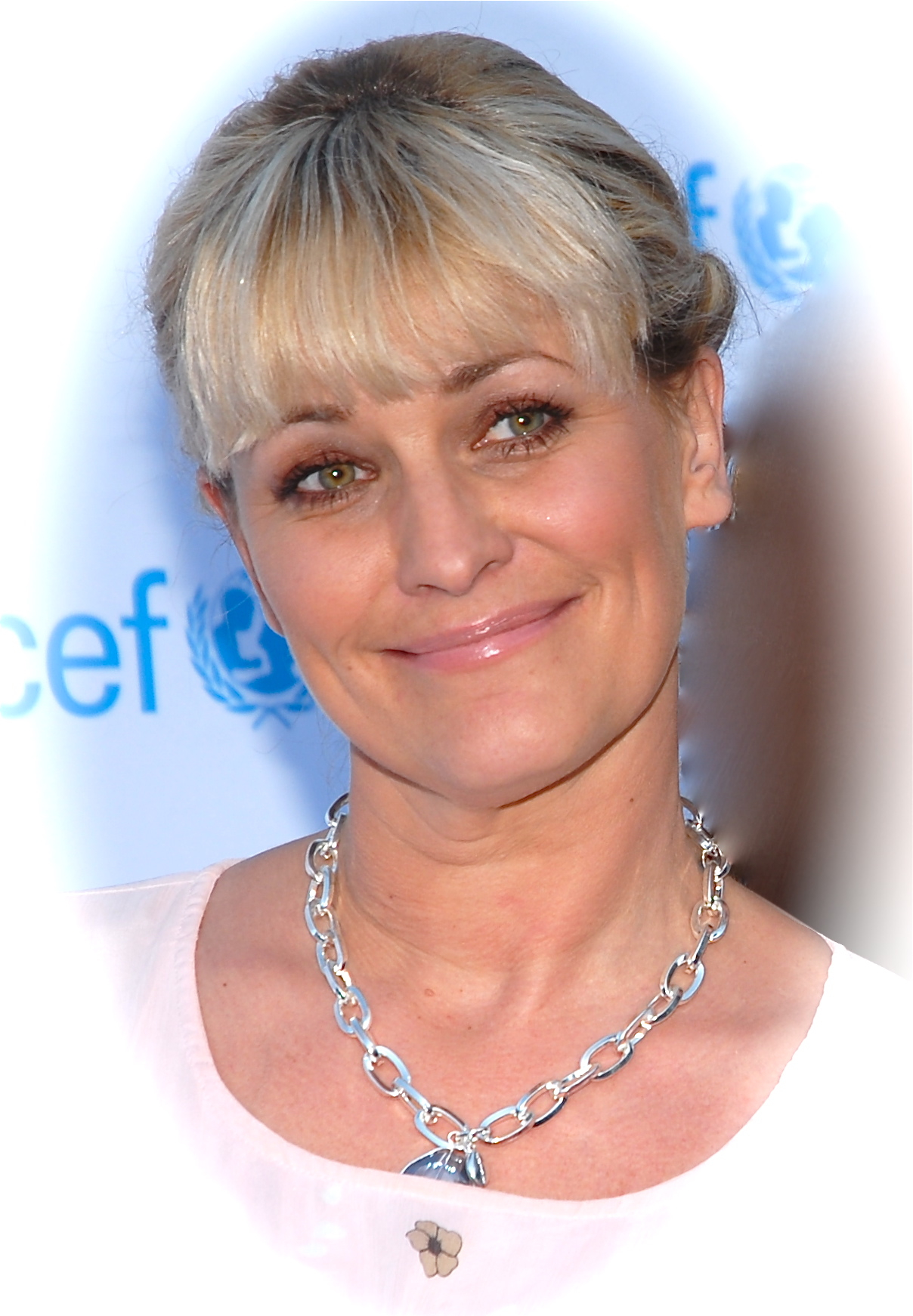
- Ahlin in 2012
- Born: 6 July 1967 (age 57); Tyresö, Sweden
- Occupation(s): Composer, presenter, singer

Katrina "Tina" Ahlin, (born 6 July 1967) is a Swedish composer, pianist and singer. She was born in Tyresö and got her education at Stockholms Musikgymnasium, Adolf Fredrik's School of Music and Kommunala musikinstitutet. She has collaborated with several Swedish singers such as Lisa Nilsson, Thomas Di Leva and Orup. She has played in several revues such as Hjalmars spelhåla, Lorry-revyn and Prins korv under taket. She has been the team leader pianist in the SVT show Så ska det låta. She has also worked in Gokväll.

In 2009, Tina Ahlin presented the show Tinas Trädgård was broadcast on TV4 Plus. She has also presented SVTs broadcasts for Valborg, the National day and Midsummer celebrations.
