= Open B tuning =

Open B Tuning is an open tuning for guitar. The open string notes in this tuning are B-F♯-B-F♯-B-D♯. It uses the three notes that form the triad of a B major chord: B, the root note; F♯, the perfect fifth; and D♯, the major third.

When the guitar is strummed without fretting any of the strings, a B major chord is sounded. This means that any major chord can be easily created using one finger, fretting all the strings at once.
