= OU (band) =

Chinese progressive metal band

- Origin: Beijing, China
- Genres: Progressive metal Progressive rock
- Years active: 2021–present
- Label: InsideOut Music
- Members: Lynn Wu; Zhang Jing; Chris Cui; Anthony Vanacore
- Website: https://www.outheband.com/

OU (pronounced oh) is a progressive metal band from Beijing, China, consisting of singer Lynn Wu, guitarist Zhang Jing, bassist Chris Cui, and drummer Anthony Vanacore. Their most recent album, II: Frailty, was released in April 2024.

== History ==
OU was formed by drummer and primary songwriter Anthony Vanacore, an American ex-pat who is fluent in Mandarin and originally moved to Beijing to work as a music teacher. Vanacore recruited guitarist Zhang Jing and bassist Chris Cui, both veterans of the local rock and jazz music community in Beijing, and later added singer Lynn Wu. The band lists Devin Townsend, The Gathering, and Radiohead as primary influences.

The band signed with the German label InsideOut Music before ever playing live. They are reportedly the first Chinese rock band to sign with a western record label. The head of InsideOut, Thomas Waber, described OU as "Very unique and modern, but still familiar sounding, a rare find these days!" InsideOut released the band's debut album One in May 2022. Lynn Wu gained notice from critics due to her completely Mandarin lyrics and experimental style; several reviewers have compared her singing to Bjork and Kate Bush. The album was also praised for mixing the band's primary progressive metal sound with jazz, electronica, and ambient styles.

OU gained the attention of labelmate Devin Townsend, who signed on to co-produce their second album. The album II: Frailty was released in April 2024, with Townsend contributing backing vocals on the song "Purge". Lynn Wu again earned praise from critics, with one reviewer describing her performance on the album as " tak[ing] it somewhere stranger and more unsettling". Another reviewer praised II: Frailty because "it’s effortless to fall prey to the polyrhythmic hypnosis that OU has mastered," while The Prog Report called the album "one of the year’s most unique releases." Loudwire praised the album as one of the best progressive metal releases of 2024.

== Members ==
- Lynn Wu – vocals
- Zhang Jing – guitar
- Chris Cui – bass
- Anthony Vanacore – drums, programming

== Discography ==
=== Albums ===
- One (2022)
- II: Frailty (2024)
