= Z² =

2014 studio album by Devin Townsend Project

Studio album by Devin Townsend and Devin Townsend Project
- Released: October 27, 2014
- Recorded: May 2014
- Genres: Progressive metal; alternative metal; industrial metal
- Length: 117:00
- Label: HevyDevy
- Producer: Devin Townsend

Devin Townsend chronology
Casualties of Cool (2014)	Z² (2014)	Transcendence (2016)

Devin Townsend Project chronology
Epicloud (2012)	Z² (2014)	Transcendence (2016)

Sky Blue

Dark Matters

Professional ratings
Review scores
Source	Rating
About.com	4/5 stars
Allmusic	3.5/5 stars
The Guardian	4/5 stars
Sputnikmusic	3.8/5

Z² (short for Ziltoid 2; pronounced "zed squared" or alternatively "zee two") is a double album by Canadian musician Devin Townsend and his musical project Devin Townsend Project, released on October 27, 2014. It consists of two albums released together: the sixth album in the Devin Townsend Project series, the rock-oriented Sky Blue, and Dark Matters, a solo metal concept album acting as a sequel to Townsend's 2007 album Ziltoid the Omniscient. The main theme of Dark Matters is, according to Townsend, "Ziltoid against the world". In 2024, it was named one of the 10 "wackiest" progressive metal albums ever by Loudwire.

== Background ==
Z² has been a long-running project, with Townsend announcing it in 2009. Later he stated that he "may have just written the heaviest thing he's ever done" for the album. Townsend also mentioned there is a surprising lack of Ziltoid himself appearing on the album, and that it "will be interesting to see how it all pans out". The project took its first steps on August 24, 2013, when a London-based radio station TeamRock Radio aired the first one-hour episode of Ziltoid Radio, a satirical radio show hosted solely by Ziltoid. Later, Townsend stated that "Z Radio is just one little element of the Z² project". After several Ziltoid Radio episodes aired, Townsend said he found the project hard to schedule and work with amidst touring and writing, because he doesn't want to just "phone it in", and "it takes a lot of effort" to keep the content with tongue-in-cheek humour entertaining. A total of seven Ziltoid Radio episodes aired between August 2013 and January 2014, and since then there has been no discussion or activity considering the series or its affiliation with the Z² project. The episodes have since been removed from TeamRock Radio's website. Townsend published a series of online videos involving Ziltoid in a series titled ZTV.

In October 2013, Townsend said that he had "more ideas than time", but that it was "almost time to start demoing" the album. Later Townsend stated that since June 2013 he had written ideas for over 70 songs, and revealed that the album was "taking shape". Townsend also stated he was going to finish the whole project in two years. In February 2014, Townsend announced the recording process of Z² started on May 2, 2014, in Los Angeles, and also revealed that the project will include the Ziltoid TV program and a live show, with a "big graphic novel comic" and a documentary. On February 26, 2014, Townsend posted that Z² will be a double album, with disc one being the main album and disc two featuring Devin Townsend Project material. According to Townsend, the album's theme will be "Ziltoid against the world". Townsend revealed his intention of adding audience-participated choir tracks on both discs.

The Z² show took place at the Royal Albert Hall on April 13, 2015, after which Townsend stated his intent to take at least a year-long hiatus from recording and touring. However, by February 2016, work had begun on the next DTP record, Transcendence. Z² won the Juno Award for Metal/Hard Music Album of the Year at the 2015 Juno Awards.

== Release ==
Z² is released in three different editions. The basic jewel case edition includes both albums on CD. The limited digipak edition features expanded artwork, both albums on CD and a bonus CD featuring Dark Matters without its dialogue. The vinyl edition features a double gatefold package in a slipcase, including the two albums on four records. The vinyl edition also includes both albums on CD. The Japanese limited edition of the album features a "Loud Park" concert on a bonus DVD, recorded in Saitama, Japan, in October 2013.

== Track listing ==
=== Disc 1: Sky Blue ===
All tracks are written by Devin Townsend.

No.	Title	Length
1.	"Rejoice"	4:16
2.	"Fallout"	4:30
3.	"Midnight Sun"	4:58
4.	"A New Reign"	4:52
5.	"Universal Flame"	4:39
6.	"Warrior"	3:31
7.	"Sky Blue"	3:52
8.	"Silent Militia"	4:28
9.	"Rain City"	7:45
10.	"Forever"	3:45
11.	"Before We Die"	8:24
12.	"The Ones Who Love"	1:32
Total length:		56:32

=== Disc 2: Dark Matters ===
All tracks are written by Devin Townsend except where noted.

No.	Title	Length
1.	"Z²"	3:59
2.	"From Sleep Awake"	3:00
3.	"Ziltoidian Empire"	6:26
4.	"War Princess" (lyrics: Townsend, Dominique Lenore Persi)	8:18
5.	"Deathray"	4:43
6.	"March of the Poozers"	6:25
7.	"Wandering Eye"	3:41
8.	"Earth"	7:39
9.	"Ziltoid Goes Home"	6:20
10.	"Through the Wormhole"	3:44
11.	"Dimension Z"	6:13
Total length:		60:28

=== Disc 3 (Collector Edition only): Dark Matters – Raw (Dialogue free) ===
All tracks are written by Devin Townsend except where noted.

No.	Title	Length
1.	"Z²"	3:54
2.	"From Sleep Awake"	3:00
3.	"Ziltoidian Empire"	6:21
4.	"War Princess" (lyrics: Townsend, Persi)	7:47
5.	"Deathray"	4:06
6.	"March of the Poozers"	5:18
7.	"Wandering Eye"	3:26
8.	"Earth"	7:47
9.	"Ziltoid Goes Home"	6:34
10.	"Dimension Z"	5:09
Total length:		53:23

Do note that the original tenth track "Through the Wormhole" has been removed entirely on the raw version, likely because it almost only consists of dialogue.

Sample and influential credits

- The chorus from the song "Sky Blue" is based on "DJ Got Us Fallin' in Love" by Usher
- The song "Silent Militia" is inspired by music of will.i.am and is based on the song "You Spin Me Round (Like a Record)" by Dead or Alive
- The song "March of the Poozers" is inspired by the song "On Earth" by Samael
- The song "Earth" is inspired by Sergei Prokofiev's "Peter and the Wolf"
- The song "Ziltoid Goes Home" is inspired by the music of Soilwork
- The song "Rain City" directly references "Bastard" from Ocean Machine

== Personnel ==
- Devin Townsend – vocals, guitars, keyboards, programming
- Dave Young – guitars, keyboards
- Brian Waddell – bass
- Ryan Van Poederooyen – drums
- Mike St-Jean – keyboards, programming
- Morgan Ågren – additional percussion
- Kat Epple – flute
- Anneke van Giersbergen – vocals
- Chris Jericho – vocals (as "Captain Spectacular")
- Dominique Lenore Persi – vocals (as "War Princess")
- Mark Cimino – vocals (as "Poozer")
- Chris Devitt – vocals (as "Planet Smasher")
- Bill Courage – narrator
- Marina Bennett – additional voices
- Adyson King – voices on "Warrior"
- Maria Werner & Jazz-A-Fire (Jasmin Kramer) – voices on "Z²" (as "excited women on Earth")
- Randy Slaugh – orchestrations, string arranging
- Florian Magnus Maier – orchestrations
- Eric Severinson – choir and orchestra conducting, additional voices
- Prague Philharmonic Orchestra – orchestra
- The audience at Utrecht Tivoli, August 5, 2014 – backing vocals on "Z²" and "March of the Poozers"
- Universal Choir – additional vocals on "Before We Die", "Z²" and "Dimension Z"

=== Production ===
- Devin Townsend – production, recording, mixing, engineering, additional mastering
- Jason Van Poederooyen – additional mixing, additional engineering
- Sheldon Zaharko – additional mixing, additional engineering
- Dave Young – additional engineering
- Mike St-Jean – additional engineering
- Randy Slaugh – orchestral engineering
- Andy VanDette – mastering
- Anthony Clarkson – artwork, layout
- Tom Hawkins – photography

== Charts ==
Chart	Peak position
Belgian Albums (Ultratop Wallonia)	126
Dutch Albums (Album Top 100)	64
Finnish Albums (Suomen virallinen lista)	4
French Albums (SNEP)	101
German Albums (Offizielle Top 100)	57
Scottish Albums (Official Charts)	37
Swiss Albums (Schweizer Hitparade)	92
UK Albums (Official Charts)	46
UK Rock & Metal Albums (Official Charts)	7
US Billboard 200	73
US Independent Albums (Billboard)	16
US Top Hard Rock Albums (Billboard)	5
US Top Rock Albums (Billboard)	14
US Indie Store Album Sales (Billboard)	17
