= Casualties of Cool =

Studio album by Casualties of Cool
- Released: May 14, 2014
- Recorded: October 2010 – February 2014
- Genre: Alternative country; ambient; blues rock; chamber rock; country rock
- Length: 73:47
- Label: HevyDevy
- Producer: Devin Townsend

Devin Townsend chronology
| The Retinal Circus (2013) | Casualties of Cool (2014) | Z² (2014) |

Professional ratings
Review scores
| Source | Rating |
|---|---|
| Sputnikmusic | 5/5 stars |

Casualties of Cool is the debut album of Canadian country music duo Casualties of Cool, consisting of Canadian musicians Devin Townsend and Ché Aimee Dorval, released on May 14, 2014. It is a musical departure from any of Townsend's previous works, primarily because it is a concept album that features alternative country songs with blues rock and ambient influences.

A number of guests performed on the album, including Morgen Ågren of Kaipa on drums, Kat Epple of Emerald Web on woodwinds, and Jørgen Munkeby of Shining on saxophone. It was partially funded by the crowdfunding site PledgeMusic.

== Background ==
The Casualties of Cool project was published officially and went into production in 2012, after Epicloud's release, although Townsend had been working on it since 2010. In September 2012, Townsend stated, "Casualties of Cool is a duo with myself and Ché. It sounds like haunted Johnny Cash songs. Late night music, completely isolated sounding and different than anything I've done. Ché sings most of the leads, and it's probably the truest reflection of who I am in life at this point". Later Townsend mentioned that Casualties of Cool features "music closest to his heart" at this point of his life, referring the album to be "a special one", "one of the most favorite things he's ever done" and "really satisfying to do". Townsend has also said the album is "much needed serious music for him" and that it is an important project he doesn't want to rush.

In August 2013, Townsend stated Casualties of Cool was done and "heading to mastering", but in early November 2013 he noted that the album was still being mixed. On November 19, 2013, Townsend posted that Casualties of Cool was completed, and next in line was mastering the album and ultimately compiling a bonus disc. The bonus disc contains the leftover material from the main album as well as songs from Ghost 2, the unreleased compilation of leftover tracks from Ghost. The release date was originally scheduled for April 2014, but was later postponed to May 2014. In February 2014, Townsend mentioned he revisited the mix many times since the album went to mastering. Originally in 2012, Townsend stated that this album would be the sixth and the last album in the Devin Townsend Project series, but in February 2014, he confirmed that Casualties of Cool is its own project, not a part of Devin Townsend Project or his solo material. Townsend also planned to start a crowdfunding campaign to support the release of the album. The campaign started on February 22, 2014, through PledgeMusic, and at the same time the release date was confirmed to May 14, 2014. The funding quickly reached its goal, and all additional funds are put directly to Townsend's upcoming projects.

== Concept ==
Townsend described the story as being about a traveler that is lured to a sentient planet, which feeds on the traveler's fear. The traveler finds solace in an old radio and later an old phonograph. Eventually, he confronts his own fear, and his "force of will to not submit to the fear" liberates a woman held inside the planet, which also frees his own soul.

== Bonus disc ==
A deluxe version of the album includes an entire bonus disc of outtakes and alternate versions. Most of the material was written with the songs on the main disc, such as "Fight," the original version of "Flight" with Townsend on lead vocals and a different ending. However, "Drench", "Mend", "Perspective", and "Moonshine" are the remaining leftovers of Ghost 2, a planned sequel to Ghost that was scrapped. Other songs intended for Ghost 2 include "Radial Highway" (released on the Contain Us box set and as a Ghost iTunes bonus track), "Fall" (released through Mackie Gear's SoundCloud), and "Watch You" (released on Contain Us). As well, "Drench" was released on Townsend's SoundCloud, and the first five tracks of Ghost 2 in sequence were released as MP3 bonus tracks with the Century Media preorders of Ghost. The only unreleased studio recordings intended for the album are "Saloon" and "Coming Home", of which the former is available in live recordings on Contain Us and By a Thread - Live in London 2011. An acoustic rendition of "Saloon" is available on Townsend's Unplugged EP.

== Pledge exclusive content ==
During the pledge drive for Casualties of Cool, a number of different bonuses were made available to anyone that pledged a certain amount of money. One of those bonuses included a "bone-shaped" USB drive that contained two bonus tracks from the Casualties of Cool sessions, along with an alternate track sequence of disc 1 of Casualties of Cool. This also included a text document that included a message from Townsend explaining the alternate track sequence for disc 1. He explains that each track is extended with new ambiance and instrumentals that allow the newly numbered sequence to mesh more fluidly. Among these extended "alternate sequence" tracks is "Gone Is Gone" from Casualties of Cool disc 2, which was originally meant to be included in disc 1 (following "Forgive Me" and prefacing "Broken"). However, due to the data restraints of the CD, the song was unable to make the cut. "Cold Feet" is said to be a by-the-numbers Casualties of Cool B-side, while "Thing" is reminiscent of the Ki sessions, fused with the production quality of Casualties of Cool. While the song explores a certain "outer space" ambiance relative to discs 1 and 2 of Casualties of Cool, it is heavier and more classic Townsend than any other Casualties of Cool song. Dorval is absent from both "Cold Feet" and "Thing". There are also two commentary tracks included covering both discs 1 and 2, totaling out to over 2 hours of commentary. These bonuses were also included in the pledge box set.

== Reissue ==
The album was re-issued worldwide on January 15, 2016 containing an additional DVD with live footage from the 2014 concert at the Union Chapel in London.

== Reception ==
Casualties of Cool was ranked the 7th best record of 2014 by Sputnikmusic, with the comment: "Suffice it to say, this a record which you should hear as soon as you possibly can. It further establishes Devin Townsend as one of today’s most accomplished, and ingenious, musicians." It also received a 5/5 rating on the website.

== Track listing ==
All music is composed by Devin Townsend except where noted.

| No. | Title | Lyrics | Length |
|---|---|---|---|
| 1. | "Daddy" | Ché Aimee Dorval | 5:11 |
| 2. | "Mountaintop" | Townsend, Dorval | 5:33 |
| 3. | "Flight" | Dorval | 5:32 |
| 4. | "The Code" | Townsend, Dorval | 4:41 |
| 5. | "Moon" | Townsend | 6:28 |
| 6. | "Pier" (co-written by Morgan Ågren) | Townsend | 3:39 |
| 7. | "Ether" | Townsend | 4:50 |
| 8. | "Hejda" | Townsend, Dorval | 3:40 |
| 9. | "Forgive Me" | Townsend, Dorval | 6:00 |
| 10. | "Broken" | Townsend | 1:59 |
| 11. | "Bones" | Dorval | 3:39 |
| 12. | "Deathscope" | Townsend | 6:13 |
| 13. | "The Field" | Dorval | 4:01 |
| 14. | "The Bridge" (co-written by Kat Epple) | Townsend | 8:13 |
| 15. | "Pure" (Epple) | Townsend | 4:08 |
| Total length: | | | 73:47 |

Deluxe edition disc 2
| No. | Title | Length |
|---|---|---|
| 1. | "Ghost Wives" (lyrics: Townsend, Dorval) | 5:04 |
| 2. | "Drained" | 4:28 |
| 3. | "Dig For Gold" (lyrics: Townsend, Dorval) | 4:41 |
| 4. | "Dead Eyes" | 5:53 |
| 5. | "Drench" (music: Townsend, Mike St-Jean, Dave Young) | 6:23 |
| 6. | "Mend" (music: Townsend, Jeff Schmidt) | 3:54 |
| 7. | "Where You've Been" | 4:52 |
| 8. | "Gone is Gone" (lyrics: Townsend, Dorval) | 4:13 |
| 9. | "Fight" | 6:49 |
| 10. | "Glass World" | 2:36 |
| 11. | "Aquarius" | 5:11 |
| 12. | "Perspective" | 7:12 |
| 13. | "Moonshine" | 3:49 |
| Total length: | | 65:05 |

Pledge version
| No. | Title | Length |
|---|---|---|
| 1. | "Daddy" | 5:11 |
| 2. | "Mountaintop" | 5:33 |
| 3. | "Flight" | 5:32 |
| 4. | "The Code" | 4:41 |
| 5. | "Moon" | 6:28 |
| 6. | "Pier" | 3:39 |
| 7. | "Ether" | 4:50 |
| 8. | "Hejda" | 3:40 |
| 9. | "Forgive Me" | 6:09 |
| 10. | "Gone Is Gone" (lyrics: Townsend, Dorval) | 4:38 |
| 11. | "Broken" | 2:00 |
| 12. | "Bones" | 3:39 |
| 13. | "Deathscope" | 6:13 |
| 14. | "The Field" | 4:01 |
| 15. | "The Bridge" | 8:13 |
| 16. | "Pure" | 4:08 |
| Total length: | | 78:35 |

Pledge exclusive content
| No. | Title | Length |
|---|---|---|
| 1. | "Cold Feet" (lyrics: Townsend) | 3:39 |
| 2. | "Thing" (lyrics: Townsend) | 6:43 |
| 3. | "CoC Commentary Disc 1" | 73:52 |
| 4. | "CoC Commentary Disc 2" | 65:04 |
| Total length: | | 149:18 |

== Personnel ==
Casualties of Cool

- Devin Townsend – guitars, bass guitar, vocals, keyboards
- Ché Aimee Dorval – lead vocals, acoustic guitar

Additional personnel

- Morgan Ågren – drums, percussion
- Kat Epple – flute, woodwinds
- Jørgen Munkeby – saxophones
- Dave Young – additional keyboards
- Mike St-Jean – additional drums
- Jeff Schmidt – additional bass guitar
- Randy Slaugh – string arrangements, engineering
- The Sångkraft Chamber Choir – choir
- Leif Åkesson – choir conducting
