= Devin Townsend discography =

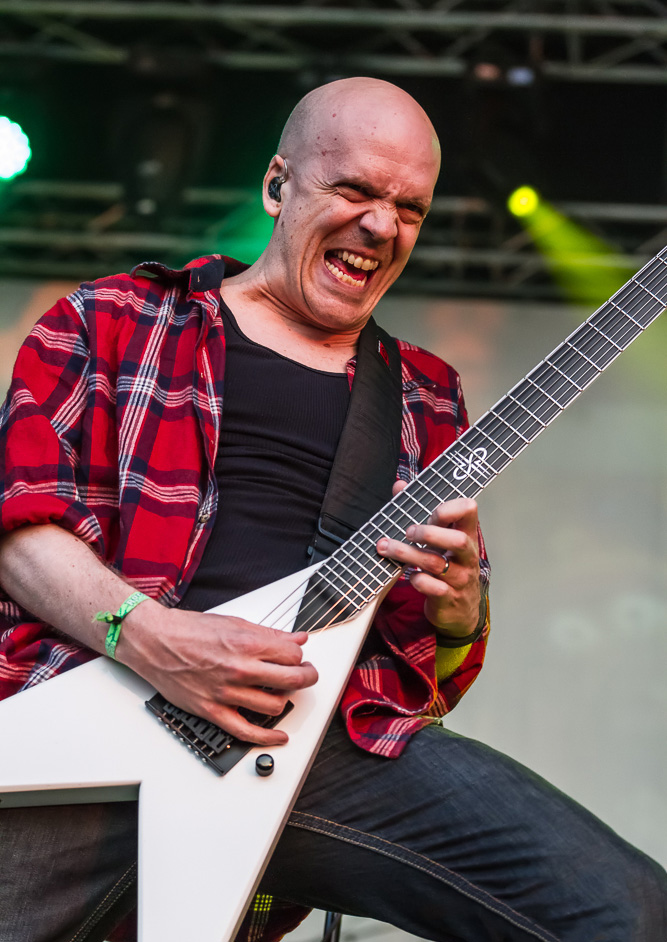
- Studio albums: 23
- Extended plays: 4
- Live albums: 4
- Compilation albums: 3
- Singles: 13
- Video albums: 3
- Music videos: 20
- Box set albums: 6

Strapping Young Lad discography
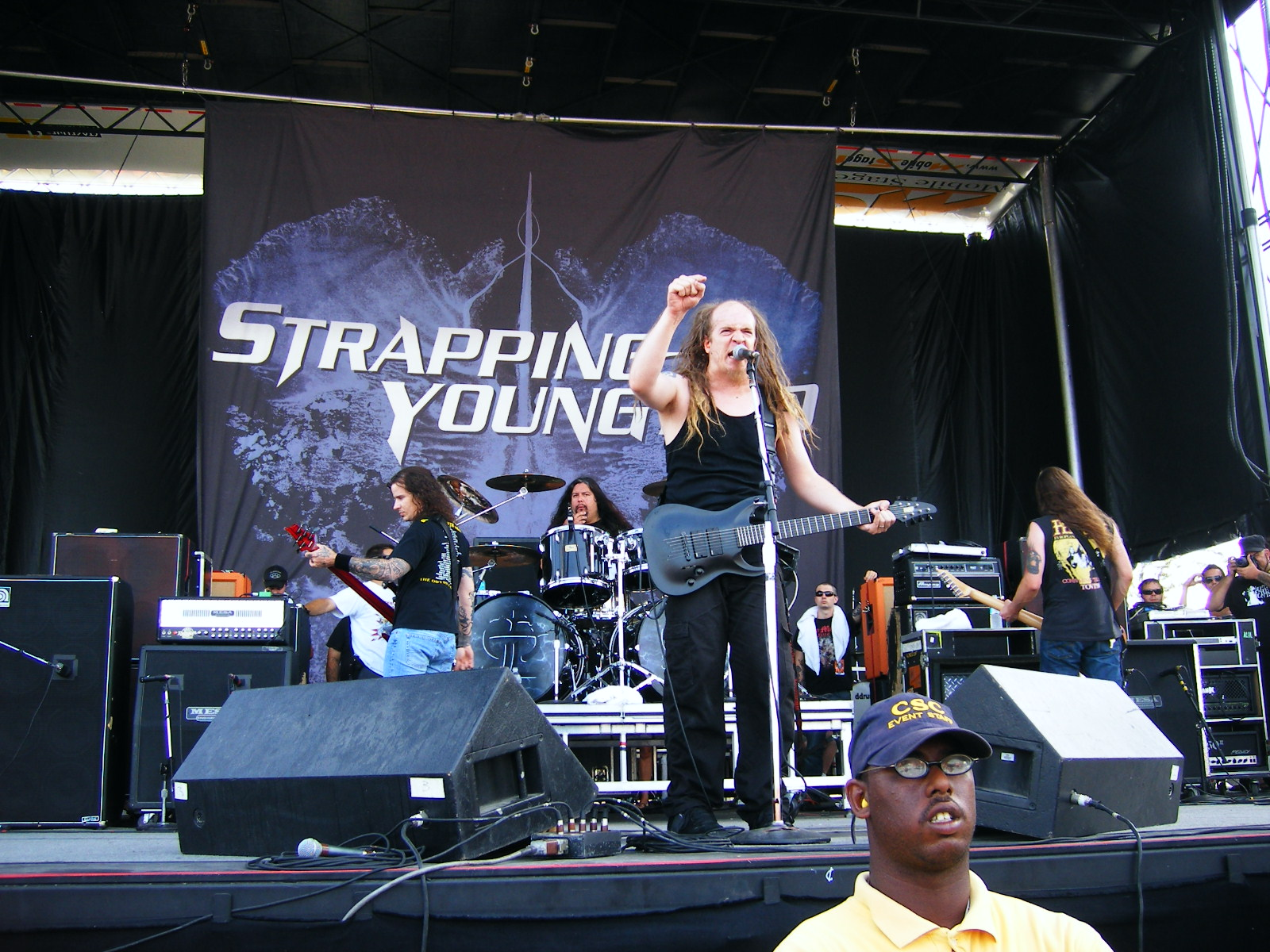
- Strapping Young Lad performing in 2006
- Studio albums: 5
- Extended plays: 2
- Live albums: 2
- Compilation albums: 1
- Video albums: 1
- Music videos: 7
- Box set albums: 1

Devin Townsend is a Canadian heavy metal musician, songwriter, and record producer.

After launching his musical career in 1993 with singing effort on Vai's Sex & Religion and subsequent tour, Townsend released the album Heavy as a Really Heavy Thing under the pseudonym Strapping Young Lad, in 1995. His debut solo release was 1996's Punky Brüster – Cooked on Phonics. Townsend formed a band under the Strapping Young Lad name to perform his next album, the industrial metal album City, in 1997. Townsend started a project initially called Biomech, under the Ocean Machine moniker, to release his less metal-influenced music. It was ultimately released under his own name as 1997's Ocean Machine: Biomech. This was followed by his first charting album, the 1998 album Infinity, which appeared at number 29 in Japan. Strapping Young Lad went on hiatus at this time so that Townsend could focus on his solo music, which had a varying lineup of supporting musicians. His 2000 release Physicist reached number 80 in Japan, and was followed by the 2001 release Terria which charted in France and Japan.

In 2002, Townsend reunited Strapping Young Lad and formed a new group, The Devin Townsend Band, as a permanent fixture for recording and touring for his solo material. The two bands recorded new albums simultaneously, and released Strapping Young Lad and Accelerated Evolution, respectively, in 2003. The former was Townsend's first album to chart in the US, appearing at number 97 on Billboard's Top Heatseekers chart. Townsend also released a special edition of Accelerated Evolution which included an EP called Project EKO. The EP was Townsend's first foray into electronica, a genre which he explored further with Devlab in 2004. Strapping Young Lad released Alien in 2005, which charted in four countries, reaching 32 on the US Top Heatseekers chart. In 2006, both bands released their final albums, The Devin Townsend Band's Synchestra charting in three European countries and Strapping Young Lad's The New Black climbing to last place on the Billboard 200. He also released a third electronica piece, an ambient album called The Hummer.

In 2007, Townsend disbanded both Strapping Young Lad and The Devin Townsend Band to spend more time with his family and less time touring. That year, a solo comedic concept album, Ziltoid the Omniscient, was released. Townsend put his music on hiatus for a year, doing production work for other artists. In late 2008, he began recording a four-album series called the Devin Townsend Project, using a different musical style and band of supporting musicians for each album. The first entry in the series, a relatively quiet rock album called Ki, was released in May 2009, reaching number 26 in Finland and appearing on the UK Indie and UK Rock charts. The second album in the series, a more heavy album called Addicted, was released in November 2009, reaching number 36 in Finland and number 2 on the US Heatseekers chart. The third and fourth albums in the series, a metal album called Deconstruction and a new-age album called Ghost, were released simultaneously on June 20, 2011. After the four albums Townsend decided to continue under the Devin Townsend Project moniker and released three more albums, entitled Epicloud, Z², and Transcendence on September 18, 2012, February 22, 2014, and September 9, 2016 respectively. During this time, Townsend also released Casualties of Cool in collaboration with Ché Aimee Dorval on May 14, 2014. Townsend has since released six albums under his own name: Empath on March 29, 2019, The Puzzle and Snuggles on December 3, 2021, Lightwork on November 4, 2022, PowerNerd on October 25, 2024, and The Moth on May 29, 2026.

== Strapping Young Lad ==
=== Studio albums ===
Title	Album details	Peak chart positions								Notes
Title	Album details	AUS	FIN	FRA	JPN	SWE	US	US Heat.	US Indie	Notes
Heavy as a Really Heavy Thing	Released: April 4, 1995; Label: Century Media; Formats: CD, LP	—	—	—	—	—	—	—	—	Reissued in 2006 with three bonus tracks.
City	Released: February 11, 1997; Label: Century Media; Formats: CD, LP	—	—	—	—	—	—	—	—	Reissued in 2007 with five bonus tracks and again in 2012 with a second CD consisting of an audio version of For Those Aboot to Rock.
Strapping Young Lad	Released: February 11, 2003; Label: Century Media; Formats: CD, LP	64	—	—	154	—	—	97	—	
Alien	Released: March 22, 2005; Label: Century Media; Formats: CD, 2×LP	74	—	156	185	48	—	32	35	
The New Black	Released: July 11, 2006; Label: Century Media; Formats: CD, LP	63	17	139	164	—	200	8	15	Limited digipak edition features two bonus tracks.
"—" denotes a recording that did not chart or was not released in that territory.

=== Live albums ===
Title	Album details	Notes
No Sleep 'till Bedtime	Released: June 2, 1998; Label: Century Media; Formats: CD, LP	Live album recorded in Melbourne, Australia.

=== Compilation albums ===
Title	Album details	Notes
1994–2006 Chaos Years	Released: March 31, 2008; Label: Century Media; Format: CD+DVD	Limited collector's edition features a special package, including a poster.

=== Box set albums ===
Title	Album details	Notes
The Complete Works	Released: July 26, 2013; Label: Blood Music; Format: 7×LP+7" box set	Comprises band's studio discography; released as four different versions, altogether limited to 700 copies.

=== EP albums ===
Title	Album details	Notes
Tour EP	Released: 2003; Label: Century Media; Format: CD	Limited edition of 2,500 copies, features tracks from Strapping Young Lad album.
C:enter:###	Released: April 19, 2007; Label: Restrain; Format: 7"	Limited edition of 500 hand-numbered copies, includes Japanese-only bonus track "C:enter:###" from The New Black, a cover of Melvins song "Zodiac" and live versions of "In the Rainy Season" and "Underneath the Waves".

=== Video albums ===
Title	Album details	Notes
For Those Aboot to Rock: Live at the Commodore	Released: November 2, 2004; Label: Century Media; Formats: DVD, 2×LP, CD	Live video performance recorded in Vancouver, Canada. CD version released as a bonus disc for limited edition of City.

=== Singles and music videos ===
Year	Title	Album	Director
1995	"S.Y.L."	Heavy as a Really Heavy Thing	Blair Dobson
1997	"Detox"	City	Dermit Shane
2003	"Relentless"	Strapping Young Lad	Marcus Rogers
2005	"Love?"	Alien	Joe Lynch
2006	"Zen"	Alien	Marcus Rogers
2006	"Wrong Side"	The New Black	David Brodsky
2007	"Almost Again"	The New Black	Konrad Palkiewicz

== Devin Townsend ==
=== Studio albums ===
Title	Album details	Peak chart positions									Notes
Title	Album details	AUS	FIN	FRA	GER	JPN	UK	US	US Heat.	US Indie	Notes
Punky Brüster – Cooked on Phonics	Released: March 19, 1996; Label: HevyDevy; Format: CD	—	—	—	—	—	—	—	—	—	Satire concept album, parody of punk rock music, specifically the pop-punk sub-genre.
Ocean Machine: Biomech	Released: July 21, 1997; Label: HevyDevy; Formats: CD, 2×LP	—	—	—	—	—	—	—	—	—	Originally released as "Biomech" under the Ocean Machine moniker.
Infinity	Released: June 17, 1998; Label: HevyDevy; Formats: CD, 2×CD, 2×LP	—	—	—	—	29	—	—	—	—	2003 CD re-release includes three bonus tracks. 2023 25th anniversary re-release with updated album artwork features the remastered album, four demo tracks from the Christeen EP and two acoustic bonus tracks.
Physicist	Released: June 26, 2000; Label: HevyDevy; Formats: CD, LP	—	—	—	—	80	—	—	—	—	Features an identical lineup to that of Strapping Young Lad.
Terria	Released: August 27, 2001; Label: HevyDevy; Formats: CD, 2×CD, 2×LP	—	—	125	—	81	—	—	—	—	Limited CD edition's second disc features "Universal" b-side and extra video content.
Accelerated Evolution	Released: March 31, 2003; Label: HevyDevy; Formats: CD, 2×CD, 2×LP	—	—	135	—	—	—	—	—	—	First album by The Devin Townsend Band. Special CD edition includes a bonus disc titled Project EKO, featuring three tracks.
Devlab	Released: December 4, 2004; Label: HevyDevy; Format: CD	—	—	—	—	—	—	—	—	—	Ambient soundscape produced entirely by Townsend.
Synchestra	Released: January 31, 2006; Label: HevyDevy; Formats: CD, CD+DVD, 2×LP	—	33	128	85	—	—	—	—	—	Second and final album by The Devin Townsend Band. Special CD edition includes a bonus DVD titled Safe Zone, featuring live performances of eight songs.
The Hummer	Released: November 15, 2006; Label: HevyDevy; Format: CD	—	—	—	—	—	—	—	—	—	Second ambient soundscape following 2004's Devlab.
Ziltoid the Omniscient	Released: May 27, 2007; Label: HevyDevy; Formats: CD, 2×CD, 2×LP	—	—	—	—	—	—	—	—	—	Special CD edition includes a second disc featuring three bonus tracks and extra video content.
Ki	Released: May 22, 2009; Label: HevyDevy; Formats: CD, 2×LP	—	26	179	—	—	—	—	69	—	First album of the Devin Townsend Project.
Addicted	Released: November 17, 2009; Label: HevyDevy, InsideOut; Formats: CD, 2×LP	—	36	—	—	—	—	—	2	22	Second album of the Devin Townsend Project.
Deconstruction	Released: June 20, 2011; Label: HevyDevy, InsideOut; Format: CD	—	15	—	—	—	—	—	23	40	Third album of the Devin Townsend Project.
Ghost	Released: June 20, 2011; Label: HevyDevy, InsideOut; Format: CD	—	15	—	—	—	—	—	12	40	Fourth album of the Devin Townsend Project.
Epicloud	Released: September 18, 2012; Label: HevyDevy; Formats: CD, 2×CD, 2×LP	80	8	96	87	—	61	105	1	26	Fifth album of the Devin Townsend Project. Deluxe CD edition includes a second disc titled Epiclouder, featuring 10 additional tracks.
Casualties of Cool	Released: May 14, 2014; Label: HevyDevy; Formats: CD, 2×CD, 2×CD+DVD, 2×LP	—	—	—	—	—	—	—	2	26	Townsend's country and blues rock album project featuring Ché Aimee Dorval and Morgan Ågren. Deluxe editions include a second CD featuring 13 additional tracks.
Z²	Released: October 27, 2014; Label: HevyDevy; Formats: 2×CD, 3×CD, 2CD+DVD, 4×LP	72	4	101	57	—	46	73	—	26	Double concept album, consisting of Dark Matters (a sequel to Ziltoid the Omniscient) and Sky Blue (sixth album of the Devin Townsend Project). Stand-alone CD and 2×LP versions of both albums were released in 2015.
Transcendence	Released: September 9, 2016; Label: HevyDevy; Formats: CD, 2×CD, 2×LP+CD	10	2	74	43	—	26	117	—	14	Seventh and final album of the Devin Townsend Project. Deluxe CD edition and vinyl edition include a bonus disc titled Holding Patterns, featuring 11 additional tracks.
Empath	Released: March 29, 2019; Label: HevyDevy, InsideOut; Formats: CD, 2×CD, 2×LP+CD	10	2	60	12	—	23	169	—	—	Limited CD edition includes a bonus disc titled Tests of Manhood, featuring 10 additional tracks.
The Puzzle / Snuggles	Released: December 3, 2021; Label: HevyDevy; Formats: 2×LP	—	50	—	—	—	—	—	—	—	Released together on physical formats, but issued separately on digital platforms.
Lightwork	Released: November 4, 2022; Label: HevyDevy, InsideOut; Formats: CD, 2×CD, 2×LP	85	9	131	—	—	50	—	—	—	Limited CD edition includes a bonus disc titled Nightwork, featuring 10 additional tracks.
PowerNerd	Released: October 25, 2024; Label: HevyDevy, InsideOut; Formats: CD, LP	—	15	—	32	—	—	—	—	—	
The Moth	Released: May 29, 2026; Label: HevyDevy, InsideOut	36	6	—	15	—	83	—	—	—	Deluxe Edition includes a bonus disc titled The Afterlife which is an alternate version of the album with only orchestra and choir.
"—" denotes a recording that did not chart or was not released in that territory.

=== Live albums ===
Title	Album details	Notes
Official Bootleg	Released: 2000; Label: HevyDevy; Formats: CD-R, DVD-R	Live album recorded in Tokyo (1999) and Vancouver (2000).
Acoustically Inclined: Live in Leeds	Released: March 19, 2021; Label: InsideOut; Formats: CD, 2×LP	Acoustic live album recorded in April 2019 at Leeds City Varieties in UK. First album of the "Devolution Series".
Galactic Quarantine	Released: June 25, 2021; Label: InsideOut; Formats: CD+BD, 2×LP, 2×LP+CD	Recording of a live stream concert originally aired on September 5, 2020. Second album of the "Devolution Series".
Empath: Live in America	Released: August 4, 2023; Label: InsideOut; Formats: CD, 2×LP	Live album recorded at the Corona Theatre in Montreal on February 26, 2020, and the Paradise Rock Club in Boston on March 1, 2020. Third album of the "Devolution Series".

=== Compilation albums ===
Title	Album details	Notes
Ass-Sordid Demos	Released: 2000; Label: HevyDevy; Format: CD	Compilation of Devin Townsend and Grey Skies demos recorded in 1990–1996.
Ass-Sordid Demos II	Released: 2004; Label: HevyDevy; Format: CD	Compilation of Noisescapes, Grey Skies and Devin Townsend demos recorded in 1991–1993.
Ancient	Released: 2016; Label: HevyDevy; Format: CS	Compilation of Grey Skies, Strapping Young Lad and Devin Townsend demos recorded in 1986–1994. Released accompanying Townsend's autobiography Only Half There.

=== Box set albums ===
Title	Album details	Notes
Contain Us	Released: December 9, 2011; Label: HevyDevy; Format: 6×CD+2×DVD box set	Includes four original Devin Townsend Project albums and both released and unreleased bonus material; limited to 5,000 copies, 500 hand-numbered copies featured a special 10" vinyl and a signed drawing.
By a Thread: Live in London 2011	Released: June 18, 2012; Label: HevyDevy; Format: 5×CD+4×DVD box set	Includes live material of four special Devin Townsend Project concerts held in London in November 2011; limited to 5,000 copies.
Eras: Vinyl Collection Part I	Released: June 8, 2018; Label: InsideOut; Format: 7×LP box set	Vinyl box set including four original Devin Townsend Project albums (Ki, Addicted, Deconstruction and Ghost); released as black, clear and transparent blue vinyl versions, altogether limited to 2,000 copies.
Eras: Vinyl Collection Part II	Released: August 31, 2018; Label: InsideOut; Format: 8×LP box set	Vinyl box set including solo albums Ocean Machine: Biomech, Infinity, Physicist and Terria with The Devin Townsend Band album Synchestra; released as black, clear and orange vinyl versions, altogether limited to 2,500 copies.
Eras: Vinyl Collection Part III	Released: December 7, 2018; Label: InsideOut; Format: 10×LP box set	Vinyl box set including The Devin Townsend Band album Accelerated Evolution with Devin Townsend Project albums Epicloud, Sky Blue, Transcendence and Live at the Royal Albert Hall ("by request" part of the Ziltoid Live at the Royal Albert Hall live album); released as black, clear and dark green vinyl versions, altogether limited to 2,500 copies.
Eras: Vinyl Collection Part IV	Released: August 23, 2019; Label: InsideOut; Format: 9×LP box set	Vinyl box set including studio albums Ziltoid the Omniscient and Dark Matters with live albums Ziltoid Live at the Royal Albert Hall and The Retinal Circus; released as black, orange and transparent green vinyl versions, altogether limited to 2,500 copies.

=== EP albums ===
Title	Album details	Notes
Christeen + 4 Demos	Released: 1998; Label: HevyDevy; Format: CD	Includes the "Christeen" single and four B-sides from the Infinity sessions.
Live in Baltimore	Released: February 14, 2011; Label: HevyDevy; Format: DL	5-song live EP by the Devin Townsend Project.
Unplugged	Released: August 9, 2011; Label: HevyDevy; Format: CD	EP recorded as a limited edition for UK acoustic shows in July 2011.
Iceland	Released: October 1, 2016; Label: HevyDevy; Format: CD	Acoustic album released together with Townsend's autobiography titled Only Half There.

=== Video albums ===
Title	Album details	Peak chart positions		Notes
Title	Album details	FIN	SWE	Notes
The Retinal Circus	Released: September 30, 2013; Label: HevyDevy; Formats: 2×CD, 2×DVD, BD, 2×CD+2×DVD+BD box set	1	11	Live video recording of a special show held at Roundhouse, London in October 2012. Released as three standard versions alongside two limited edition box sets.
Ziltoid Live at the Royal Albert Hall	Released: November 13, 2015; Label: HevyDevy; Formats: 3×CD+DVD, BD, 3×CD+2×DVD+BD box set	—	—	Live video recording of a special show held at Royal Albert Hall, London in April 2015. Released as standard versions alongside a limited edition box set, containing all formats and a hardcover book.
Ocean Machine: Live at the Ancient Roman Theatre Plovdiv	Released: July 6, 2018; Label: HevyDevy; Formats: 3×CD+DVD, BD, 3×CD+2×DVD+BD box set	—	—	Live video recording of a special show held at the Roman Theatre of Plovdiv, Bulgaria in September 2017. Released as standard versions alongside a limited edition box set, containing all formats and a hardcover book.
Order of Magnitude: Empath Live Volume 1	Released: October 23, 2020; Label: HevyDevy; Formats: 2×CD+DVD, BD, 2×CD+DVD+BD box set	—	—	Live video recording of a show of the "Empath Volume 1" tour held at Roundhouse, London in December 2019. Released as standard versions alongside a limited edition box set, containing all formats and a hardcover book.

=== Singles ===
Year	Title	Album	Notes
1998	"Christeen": Released: December 3, 1998; Label: USG; Format: CDS	Infinity	Features "Wild Colonial Boy" and "Night" as B-sides.
2011	"Juular": Released: June 20, 2011; Label: HevyDevy; Format: 7"	Deconstruction	Blue-gray picture disc, features "Feather (edit)" as a B-side. Originally only made available as a part of a limited "The Calm & the Storm" bundle, featuring Deconstruction and Ghost albums.
2012	"Kingdom": Released: October 27, 2012; Label: InsideOut; Format: 7"	Epicloud	White picture disc, features "Heatwave (demo)" as a B-side. Originally only made available to VIP attendees of The Retinal Circus concert as "Soft Inc. EP".
2012	"Coast (Take Two)": Released: November 5, 2012; Label: InsideOut; Format: 7"	By a Thread: Live in London	Single-sided picture disc, limited to 1,000 hand-numbered copies. All copies include hand-written and signed certificate by Townsend.
2013	"Lucky Animals": Released: November 29, 2013; Label: InsideOut; Format: 10"	Epicloud	White vinyl, features "Truth (live)" as a B-side. Record Store Day exclusive release.
2016	"Failure": Released: August 5, 2016; Label: InsideOut; Format: DL	Transcendence	
2016	"Secret Sciences": Released: August 19, 2016; Label: InsideOut; Format: DL	Transcendence	
2016	"Stormbending": Released: August 31, 2016; Label: InsideOut; Format: DL	Transcendence	
2019	"Genesis": Released: February 22, 2019; Label: InsideOut; Format: DL, streaming	Empath	
2019	"Evermore": Released: March 15, 2019; Label: InsideOut; Format: DL, streaming	Empath	
2022	"Moonpeople": Released: August 26, 2022; Label: HevyDevy, InsideOut; Format: DL, streaming	Lightwork	
2022	"Call of the Void": Released: September 27, 2022; Label: HevyDevy, InsideOut; Format: DL, streaming	Lightwork	
2022	"Lightworker": Released: October 25, 2022; Label: HevyDevy, InsideOut; Format: DL, streaming	Lightwork	

=== Music videos ===
Year	Title	Album	Director
1997	"Life"	Ocean Machine: Biomech	
1998	"Christeen"	Infinity	
2003	"Storm"	Accelerated Evolution	Marcus Rogers
2006	"Vampira"	Synchestra	Marcus Rogers
2009	"Coast"	Ki	Konrad Palkiewicz
2009	"Bend It Like Bender!"	Addicted	Konrad Palkiewicz
2010	"Supercrush!"	Addicted	Konrad Palkiewicz
2011	"Juular"	Deconstruction	David Brodsky
2012	"Lucky Animals"	Epicloud	Devin Townsend
2014	"Mountaintop"	Casualties of Cool	Jessica Cope
2014	"Flight"	Casualties of Cool	Konrad Palkiewicz
2016	"Stormbending"	Transcendence	
2019	"Genesis"	Empath	
2019	"Evermore"	Empath	
2019	"Spirits Will Collide"	Empath	
2019	"Why?"	Empath	
2020	"Sprite"	Empath	
2022	"Moonpeople"	Lightwork	
2022	"Call of the Void"	Lightwork	
2022	"Lightworker"	Lightwork	
2024	"PowerNerd"	PowerNerd	
2024	"Gratitude"	PowerNerd	
2024	"Knuckledragger"	PowerNerd	
2024	"Jainism"	PowerNerd	
2026	"Enter The City"	The Moth	
2026	"Home At Night"	The Moth	
2026	"Prepare for War - The Big Snit"	The Moth	

== DreamPeace ==
=== Studio Albums ===
Title	Album details	Notes
Tryptophan	Released: July 14, 2023; Label: HevyDevy; Format: Download	Originally released as Guitar Improvisation #1 on May 31, 2020
Sky Gods	Released: July 14, 2023; Label: HevyDevy; Format: Download	Originally released as Guitar Improvisation #2 on June 14, 2020
Dawn Shifter	Released: July 14, 2023; Label: HevyDevy; Format: Download	Originally released as Guitar Improvisation #3 on July 15, 2020
Beautiful Day	Released: July 14, 2023; Label: HevyDevy; Format: Download	Originally released as Snuggles on December 3, 2021
Snow Day	Released: July 14, 2023; Label: HevyDevy; Format: Download	Originally released as Dreampiece on February 26, 2022
Pond Skimmer	Released: July 14, 2023; Label: HevyDevy; Format: Download	
Space Oyster	Released: July 14, 2023; Label: HevyDevy; Format: Download	

== Other appearances ==
Devin Townsend has appeared on numerous albums outside of his solo material and Strapping Young Lad, often filling the role as the producer.

Year	Album	Artist	Credit(s)
1993	Sex & Religion	Steve Vai	Vocals
1994	IR8	IR8	Guitar
1994	Millennium	Front Line Assembly	Guitar on "Division of Mind", "Vigilante" and "Sex Offender"
1995	Hard Wired	Front Line Assembly	Guitar on "Circuitry", "Modus Operandi", "Transparent Species", "Barcode" and "Condemned"
1995	Alien Love Secrets	Steve Vai	Spoken word at the end of song "Juice"
1996	Working Man – A Tribute to Rush	Various Artists	Vocals on "Natural Science"
1996	Convergence	James Murphy	Vocals on "Since Forgotten", vocals and keys on "The Last One"
1996	Fire Garden	Steve Vai	Vocals on "Whookam"
1996	Pigwalk	Stuck Mojo	Producer, vocals on "Animal" and "Violate", guitar on "Inside My Head"
1997	Urge	The Wildhearts	Vocals on "Kill Me to Death"
1997	Stillborn	Unit:187	Guitar, vocals
1997	Loaded	Unit:187	Producer
1997	GRRRR!!	Various Artists	Producer
1997	Bound by Fire	Zimmers Hole	Producer
1997	A Tribute to Judas Priest – Legends of Metal	Various Artists	Vocals, guitars, keyboards and production on "Sinner"
1998	Anarchic Airwaves	The Wildhearts	Guitar
1998	Remix dystemper	Skinny Puppy	Guitar on "Worlock (Rhys Fulber – Eye of the Beholder Mix)"
2001	Music for Them Asses	The Almighty Punchdrunk	Producer, guitar, synthesizer
2001	Legion of Flames	Zimmers Hole	Producer
2001	Someone Please Kill Me	Frygirl	Producer
2001	Finger It Out	Just Cause	Producer
2001	Violate This	Stuck Mojo	Producer, vocals on "Wrathchild" and "Shout at the Devil"
2002	Evenlight	Evenlight	Producer, vocals on "Los Bad Guy 'Os" and "Pay", guitar on "Rat in a Maze" and "Tapper"
2002	The Lament Configuration	December	Producer
2002	Symbol of Life	Paradise Lost	Vocals on "Two Worlds" and "Small Town Boy"
2002	The De-Evolution of Yasmine Bleeth	Sir Millard Mulch	Spoken word on "The Great Strength of Our Order"
2002	Natural Born Chaos	Soilwork	Producer, vocals on "Black Star Deceiver" and "Soilworker's Song of the Damned"
2002	A Tribute to the Beast Vol. 2	Various Artists	Producer, vocals on "Wrathchild" (with Stuck Mojo)
2003	As the Palaces Burn	Lamb of God	Producer, guitar on "A Devil in God's Country"
2004	The Human Equation	Ayreon	Lyrics and vocals on "Day Three: Pain", "Day Eight: School" and "Day Sixteen: Loser"
2004	Heavilution	The Heavils	Producer
2004	Ten Ways from Sunday	Ten Ways from Sunday	Producer
2004	Of Malice and the Magnum Heart	Misery Signals	Producer, vocals on "A Victim, a Target"
2005	How to Sell the Whole F#@!ing Universe to Everybody... Once and for All!	Sir Millard Mulch	Spoken word on "The Great Strength of Our Professional Affiliations/How to Spend Music Industry Currency"
2005	Undoing Ruin	Darkest Hour	Producer
2006	Beyond Hell	Gwar	Producer, vocals on "Tormentor"
2007	Deliver Us	Darkest Hour	Producer, guitar on "Full Imperial Collapse"
2007	If You Don't Have Anything Nice to Say, Start a Band	Removal	Vocals on "Layers of the Union"
2007	Iron Gag	A Life Once Lost	Guitar solo on "Detest"
2007	Sworn to a Great Divide	Soilwork	Vocal production
2007	Summon in Thunder	Himsa	Vocal production
2008	When You Were Shouting at the Devil... We Were in League with Satan	Zimmers Hole	Producer
2008	Controller	Misery Signals	Producer
2008	Declaration	Bleeding Through	Producer
2008	Dichotomy	Becoming the Archetype	Producer
2008	Terror Syndrome	Terror Syndrome	Mixing, guitar on "Spinning Backwards"
2009	Monolith	Sights & Sounds	Producer
2009	The Internal Dialogue	Contrive	Mixing
2009	Constellations	August Burns Red	Additional mixing
2009	Bury Me Alive	Inhale Exhale	MIxing
2009	In Your Room	Agua de Annique	Writer on "Just Fine"
2009	Guitars That Ate My Brain	Various Artists	Writer and performer on "Nerd Alert"
2010	Ich tu dir weh	Rammstein	Remixing on "Rammlied"
2011	Sea Shepherd EP	Gojira	Vocals on "Of Blood and Salt"
2011	Noistalgia	Bent Sea	Producer, bass
2011	SIN-atra	Various Artists	Vocals on "New York, New York"
2012	Eremita	Ihsahn	Vocals on "Introspection"
2012	Burning in Water... Drowning in Flame	Pitch Black Forecast	Guitar and backing vocals on "Open Letter to God"
2013	We Are (single)	Revolution Harmony	Guitar solo
2013	Wild Card	ReVamp	Vocals on "The Anatomy of a Nervous Breakdown: Neurasthenia"
2015	Batterie Deluxe	Morgan Ågren	Writer and performer on "F Files"
2015	Viscera	Haunted Shores	Vocals on "Feed the Wolf"
2015	Take Me Home	Shelter Dogs	Bass and backing vocals, writer on "Past Be Gone"
2015	The Direction of Last Things	Intronaut	Mixing
2016	Modern Primitive	Steve Vai	Vocals on "The Lost Chord"
2016	Decades of Destruction	Various Artists	Performer on "Fast as a Shark"
2016	Velcro Kid	Thomas Giles	Vocals on "Gazer"
2017	Outsider	Comeback Kid	Vocals on "Absolute"
2017	III: Dark Black	Mutation	Writing, performer
2018	The Reworks	Pendulum	Remixing and vocals on "Crush"
2018	Structural Fatigue	Process	Mixing
2020	Ultraviolet	Misery Signals	Co-producer, backing vocals
2021	Songs for the Apocalypse (An Auditory Excursion of Whimsical Delirium)	Jason Bieler and the Baron von Bielski Orchestra	Guitar solo on "Bring Out Your Dead"
2021	Afterworld	All India Radio	Vocals on "Sula Guin"
2021	SepulQuarta	Sepultura	Vocals, guitars and mixing on "Mask"
2021	Classics	Four Stroke Baron	Mixing
2021	New Man, New Songs, Same Shit Vol. 2	Me and That Man	Vocals on "Goodbye"
2024	II: Frailty	OU	Mixing, co-producer, vocals on "Purge"
