= The Retinal Circus =

Live album by Devin Townsend
- Released: September 30, 2013
- Recorded: October 27, 2012, at Roundhouse, Chalk Farm, London
- Genre: Progressive metal; industrial metal; alternative metal; progressive rock; new-age
- Length: 128:58
- Label: HevyDevy
- Producer: Devin Townsend

Devin Townsend chronology
Epicloud (2012)	The Retinal Circus (2013)	Casualties of Cool (2014)

Professional ratings
Review scores
Source	Rating
About.com	3.5/5 stars

The Retinal Circus is a live album by Canadian musician Devin Townsend. It was released on September 30, 2013, in Europe, and on October 29, 2013, in North America. The audio and video material were recorded at Roundhouse, London, on October 27, 2012, when Townsend performed a special one-night-only concert celebrating and covering his 20-year musical career.

== Concert ==
In November 2011, after performing a series of special Devin Townsend Project shows, Devin Townsend revealed his plan to perform a one-off concert in London, England, that would cover his musical career from mid-1990s up to that point. Townsend stated that he wanted to create a "more than musical" show which included a storyline, multiple performers and special effects. Later he said that the concert would be recorded for future release.

The concert lasted approximately two and a half hours, and it was divided into two parts, with an intermission in between. The band consisted of the same personnel as the recent years' Devin Townsend Project line-up, and the special guests were Anneke van Giersbergen and Jed Simon, with Steve Vai hosting the show via pre-recorded video projected onto screens. The setlist was focused heavily on material from Epicloud and a few other albums from Townsend's catalogue; the setlist included no songs from Terria, Accelerated Evolution, Ki and Ghost. Townsend also performed, against his then-current principles, two Strapping Young Lad songs. He later stated that this was because of the career-spanning nature of the concert, and playing those two songs was a "closure for him and Strapping Young Lad". He also wanted to "respect the legacy of the band" and to reconnect and perform again with Jed Simon.

The concert was one of the most prepared Devin Townsend shows ever, with over a year of pre-production, and it was recorded in high definition with a higher budget and a more professional approach to production than the previous live release, By a Thread. 5000 people saw the sold out performance, and the concert was also streamed live through Livemusicstage.com.

== Release ==
The Retinal Circus was released as six different versions. The standard editions feature either a double-CD, double-DVD or a Blu-ray. The Blu-ray version includes the whole concert on a single disc. The digipak edition features both the CDs and the DVDs. Two limited edition box sets were also released: a "clown box" featuring all five discs of the standard editions, limited to 5000 copies worldwide, and a "monkey box" featuring all five discs with a 40-page book, signed lithography print and fan merchandise, housed in a vinyl sized box with a pop-up of the Retinal Circus stage. The "monkey box" edition is limited to 2500 hand-numbered copies worldwide. The album was a chart success in some countries, with the double-DVD version peaking at No. 1 in Finland.

== Track listing ==
All track lengths taken from the CD release.

All tracks are written by Devin Townsend.

Disc one
No.	Title	Album	Length
1.	"Effervescent!/True North"	Epicloud	6:23
2.	"Lucky Animals"	Epicloud	3:33
3.	"Planet of the Apes"	Deconstruction	11:02
4.	"Truth"	Infinity	3:59
5.	"War"	Infinity	6:09
6.	"Soul Driven"	Infinity	1:08
7.	"Planet Smasher"	Ziltoid the Omniscient	6:19
8.	"Babysong"	Synchestra	5:30
9.	"Vampolka"	Synchestra	1:36
10.	"Vampira"	Synchestra	3:42
11.	"Addicted!"	Addicted	5:32
12.	"Color Your World"	Ziltoid the Omniscient	9:48
13.	"The Greys"	Ziltoid the Omniscient	4:55
Total length:			69:36

Disc two
No.	Title	Album	Length
1.	"Hyperdrive"	Ziltoid the Omniscient/Addicted	4:44
2.	"Ih-Ah!"	Addicted	3:58
3.	"Where We Belong"	Epicloud	4:18
4.	"Detox" (Strapping Young Lad)	City	6:03
5.	"Bend It Like Bender!"	Addicted	3:36
6.	"Life"	Ocean Machine: Biomech	4:52
7.	"Kingdom"	Physicist/Epicloud	5:09
8.	"Juular"	Deconstruction	3:59
9.	"Love?" (Strapping Young Lad)	Alien	5:23
10.	"Colonial Boy"	Infinity	2:58
11.	"Grace"	Epicloud	6:52
12.	"Little Pig"	Epiclouder	7:30
Total length:			59:22

== Personnel ==
- Devin Townsend – vocals, guitars, keyboards, programming
- Dave Young – guitars
- Brian Waddell – bass
- Ryan Van Poederooyen – drums

=== Guest musicians ===
- Anneke van Giersbergen – vocals
- Jed Simon – guitars
- Dom Lawson – vocals ("Planet Smasher")
