= The New Black =

Studio album by Strapping Young Lad
- Released: July 11, 2006
- Recorded: 2006
- Genres: Industrial metal; thrash metal; extreme metal
- Length: 42:43
- Label: Century Media
- Producers: Devin Townsend, Strapping Young Lad

Strapping Young Lad chronology
Alien (2005)	The New Black (2006)	1994–2006 Chaos Years (2008)

Devin Townsend chronology
Synchestra (2006)	The New Black (2006)	The Hummer (2006)

The New Black is the fifth and final studio album by Canadian heavy metal band Strapping Young Lad. It was released on July 11, 2006, debuting at No. 200 on the Billboard charts.

== Background ==
Century Media imposed a strict deadline on the release date of the album: it was to be ready before the 2006 Ozzfest festival. Despite this, Townsend stated the recording was not rushed, and The New Black became a critical, as well as a commercial, success. It was more melodic than any of the band's previous albums and brought back the debut album's tongue-in-cheek humour.

"Decimator" references "Depth Charge" from Accelerated Evolution. "Far Beyond Metal" is a studio recording of a tour song previously released on No Sleep 'till Bedtime and For Those Aboot to Rock. "Almost Again" emulates the keyboard-heavy ending of "Truth" from Infinity. "Polyphony" shares a riff with "Judgement" from Synchestra. A riff from "Monument" was later used as the bridge riff of "Lucky Animals" on Epicloud. An instrumental version of "Fucker" was released on Contain Us. "The New Black" borrows some lyrics and vocal melodies from the Grotus song "Sleepwalking".

== Promotion and touring ==
A music video was shot in late May to accompany the sole single from the album, "Wrong Side". In June 2006 Strapping Young Lad embarked on a short festival tour of Europe, including performances at the Rock am Ring and Rock im Park festivals in Germany, and the Download Festival in England, which was followed by a second stage appearance at Ozzfest in July and August, where they played to some of the largest audiences in their career.

A music video for the song "Almost Again" was included as part of the DVD package for 1994–2006 Chaos Years, more than two years after the release of the album.

== Packaging ==
The album comes packaged with a second CD featuring a sampling of various other Century Media artists. The European version contains two bonus tracks: "The Long Pig" and a cover of Melvins' "Zodiac". The Japanese version contains "The Long Pig" and the instrumental "C:enter:###".

== Release ==
The New Black was released on July 11, 2006. Having sold more than 4,000 copies during its first week, The New Black reached No. 200 on the Billboard 200 chart, No. 15 on the Top Independent Albums, and No. 8 on the Top Heatseekers charts.

== Critical reception ==
Professional ratings
Review scores
Source	Rating
About.com	4.5/5 stars
Allmusic	3.5/5 stars
Collector's Guide to Heavy Metal	6/10
Stylus Magazine	B+

Stylus Magazine's Cosmo Lee described the album as "heavy, catchy, and with no filler", and About.com's Chad Bowar was also positive giving the album four and a half stars out of five, stating that "this is a CD that's dense and heavy, but also has some memorable hooks".

== Track listing ==
All lyrics are written by Devin Townsend; all music is composed by Strapping Young Lad.

No.	Title	Length
1.	"Decimator"	2:53
2.	"You Suck" (feat. Cam Kroetsch)	2:40
3.	"Anti Product"	3:56
4.	"Monument"	4:11
5.	"Wrong Side"	3:35
6.	"Hope"	5:02
7.	"Far Beyond Metal" (feat. Oderus Urungus)	4:36
8.	"Fucker" (feat. Bif Naked)	3:53
9.	"Almost Again"	3:43
10.	"Polyphony"	1:54
11.	"The New Black"	6:15
Total length:		42:43

European bonus tracks
No.	Title	Length
12.	"The Long Pig"	1:22
13.	"Zodiac" (Melvins cover)	3:59

Japanese bonus tracks
No.	Title	Length
12.	"The Long Pig"	1:22
13.	"C:enter:###" (instrumental)	3:04

== Personnel ==
Strapping Young Lad

- Devin Townsend – guitars, lead vocals
- Jed Simon – guitars, backing vocals
- Byron Stroud – bass, backing vocals
- Gene Hoglan – drums, percussion

Additional

- Devin Townsend – production
- Will Campagna – keyboards, backing vocals
- Cam Kroetsch – guest vocals on "You Suck"
- Oderus Urungus – guest vocals on "Far Beyond Metal"
- Bif Naked – guest vocals on "Fucker"
- Chris Valagao Mina – guitars, backing vocals
- Shaun Thingvold – engineering
- Mike Fraser – mixing
- Ryan Van Poederooyen – drum technician
- Travis Smith – artwork and photography

== Charts ==
Weekly chart performance for The New Black
Chart (2006)	Peak position
Australian Albums (ARIA)	63
Finnish Albums (Suomen virallinen lista)	17
French Albums (SNEP)	139
