= Ocean Machine - Live at the Ancient Roman Theatre Plovdiv =

Ocean Machine – Live at the Ancient Roman Theatre Plovdiv

Video by Devin Townsend Project
- Released: 6 July 2018
- Recorded: 22 September 2017
- Venue: Ancient Roman Theatre, Plovdiv, Bulgaria
- Genre: Progressive metal, progressive rock
- Length: 49:28 (CD1); 39:37 (CD2); 01:13:03 (CD3); Total length: 02:42:09
- Label: Inside Out Music

Devin Townsend Project chronology
Transcendence (2016)	Ocean Machine – Live at the Ancient Roman Theatre Plovdiv (2018)	Empath (2019)

Singles from Ocean Machine – Live at the Ancient Roman Theatre Plovdiv
- 1. "Truth" Released: 24 May 2018; 2. "Regulator" Released: 22 June 2018; 3. "By Your Command" Released: 6 July 2018

Professional ratings
Review scores
Source	Rating
Metal Hammer	5/7 stars
Metal Injection	9/10 stars
Sunday Express	5/5 stars

Ocean Machine – Live at the Ancient Roman Theatre Plovdiv is the third live album from Devin Townsend Project. It was released on 6 July 2018. The album features a full live performance of Ocean Machine: Biomech, as of the 20th anniversary of the album as well as a set of fan-requested tracks with the Orchestra and Choir of Plovdiv State Opera. The concert was filmed at the Ancient Roman Theatre in Plovdiv, Bulgaria on 22 September 2017.

== Background ==
Regarding the release of the album, band leader Devin Townsend commented:

Plovdiv and this live package represents a lot to me, it signifies the end of one era, and the celebration of another. Amidst a gruelling touring year, this show came together with much blood, sweat, and tears, and the result is the culmination of many aspects of my work on one stage. Ocean Machine was released 20 years ago, and though Marty (Chapman) is no longer with us, I was able to finally perform the album in its entirety with the original bassist John 'Squid' Harder on this night. On a cold evening in an old city in the ancient theatre, many lifelong milestones came to a conclusion on this night and I'm exceptionally proud of it.

== Track listing ==
=== DVD ===
1. Truth (from Infinity and Transcendence)
2. Stormbending (from Transcendence)
3. Om (from Christeen + 4 Demos and Infinity's original track list)
4. Failure (from Transcendence)
5. By Your Command (from Ziltoid the Omniscient)
6. Gaia (from Synchestra)
7. Deadhead (from Accelerated Evolution)
8. Canada (from Terria)
9. Bad Devil (from Infinity)
10. Higher (from Transcendence)
11. A Simple Lullaby (from Synchestra)
12. Deep Peace (from Terria)
13. Seventh Wave (from Ocean Machine)
14. Life (from Ocean Machine)
15. Night (from Ocean Machine)
16. Hide Nowhere (from Ocean Machine)
17. Sister (from Ocean Machine)
18. 3 A.M. (from Ocean Machine)
19. Voices in the Fan (from Ocean Machine)
20. Greetings (from Ocean Machine)
21. Regulator (from Ocean Machine)
22. Funeral (from Ocean Machine)
23. Bastard (from Ocean Machine)
24. The Death of Music (from Ocean Machine)
25. Things Beyond Things (from Ocean Machine)
