= Epicloud =

Studio album by Devin Townsend Project
- Released: September 18, 2012
- Recorded: March–May 2012
- Studios: Kingdom Studio (Perth, Australia), Strait Sound Studio (Gibsons, Canada), The Armoury Studios (Vancouver, Canada)
- Genres: Alternative metal; hard rock; progressive metal
- Length: 49:52
- Label: HevyDevy
- Producer: Devin Townsend

Devin Townsend Project chronology
By a Thread – Live in London 2011 (2012)	Epicloud (2012)	Z² (2014)

Devin Townsend chronology
By a Thread – Live in London 2011 (2012)	Epicloud (2012)	The Retinal Circus (2013)

Professional ratings
Review scores
Source	Rating
About.com	3/5 stars
AllMusic	3.5/5 stars
Blistering	8.5/10 stars
Sputnikmusic	3.0/5

Epicloud is the fifteenth studio album by Canadian musician Devin Townsend, and the fifth album in the Devin Townsend Project series. The album was released on September 18, 2012, in North America, and September 24, 2012, in Europe, through his independent record label HevyDevy Records and Inside Out Music.

== Background ==
In an interview with Soundwave TV, Townsend discussed how Epicloud was conceived: "In this sort of process of writing that I've discovered that I guess I'm capable of now, with a sober frame of mind, part of that is just not second-guessing it, so if I write something like that, I just do it, and just finish it."

He continued, "Over the past couple of years, I thought, 'OK, I've gotta write this next 'Ziltoid' thing; I'm inspired to make this epic space opera and, like, really overdo it, and make it really dark.' And so I sat down to write, but every time I went to write, I'd write some poppy hard rock thing. And I was like, 'OK, we'll get that one out of the way and then I'll write 'Ziltoid'.' And I got it out of the way and I'd go write 'Ziltoid'. And I'd write another one. So I'm thinking, 'OK, it's pretty obvious to me that I've got this that wants to come out before that.'"

Regarding the musical direction of Epicloud, Townsend told Noisecreep, "Over the course of the full record, there's sort of new age-y stuff, jazzy stuff, really heavy stuff. We basically cover the gamut. Epicloud is the first record that I felt confident enough to include all those things on one record so it goes between melodic hard rock to schizophrenic heavy metal to country to really ambient stuff and it's all in one place. I'm using a gospel choir, a string section and a horn section for this one as well."

When discussing the name of the album, Townsend said the title is a double entendre. The first meaning was inspired by the many plane journeys he and the band took while on tour, when Townsend noted how cool he thought it was that they were above the clouds, 'epi-cloud', while the second comes from the musical content of the album itself, 'epic-loud'.

On the topic of his decision to re-record "Kingdom", a song from his Physicist album, which came out in 2000 on Townsend's label HevyDevy Records, Townsend said, "We re-did 'Kingdom' because it's a live set staple, and so much better now than the Physicist recording."

== Track listing ==
All tracks are written by Devin Townsend except where noted.

No.	Title	Writer(s)	Length
1.	"Effervescent!"		0:44
2.	"True North"		3:53
3.	"Lucky Animals"		3:21
4.	"Liberation"	Townsend, Ryan Van Poederooyen	3:21
5.	"Where We Belong"		4:27
6.	"Save Our Now" (based on a structure written by Rob Swire)		4:08
7.	"Kingdom"		5:29
8.	"Divine"		3:17
9.	"Grace"	Townsend, Van Poederooyen	6:09
10.	"More!"		4:05
11.	"Lessons"		1:07
12.	"Hold On"		3:57
13.	"Angel"		5:54
Total length:			49:52

Japanese Edition Bonus Track
No.	Title	Length
14.	"Epicloud"	6:08
Total length:		56:00

Vinyl Edition Bonus Track
No.	Title	Length
14.	"Epicloud"	6:08
Total length:		56:00

iTunes Bonus Tracks
No.	Title	Length
15.	"Cry Forever"	4:00
16.	"Take My Ego"	6:22
Total length:		66:22

Epiclouder (Deluxe Edition Disc 2)
No.	Title	Length
1.	"Believe" (demo)	4:05
2.	"Happy Birthday" (demo)	4:36
3.	"Quietus" (demo)	5:34
4.	"Heatwave" (demo)	3:36
5.	"Love Tonight" (demo)	4:49
6.	"The Mind WASP" (demo)	4:40
7.	"Woah No!" (demo)	4:11
8.	"Love and Marriage" (demo)	4:02
9.	"Socialization" (demo)	7:18
10.	"Little Pig" (demo)	4:53
Total length:		47:44

== Personnel ==
- Devin Townsend – guitars, vocals, keyboards
- Anneke van Giersbergen – vocals
- Ryan Van Poederooyen – drums
- Brian Waddell – bass
- Dave Young – guitars, additional keyboards

=== Production ===
- Devin Townsend – mixing, engineering
- Anthony Clarkson – artwork

== Charts ==
Chart	Peak position
Belgian Albums (Ultratop Flanders)	169
Belgian Albums (Ultratop Wallonia)	115
Dutch Albums (Album Top 100)	88
Finnish Albums (Suomen virallinen lista)	8
French Albums (SNEP)	96
German Albums (Offizielle Top 100)	87
Scottish Albums (Official Charts)	54
UK Albums (Official Charts)	61
UK Rock & Metal Albums (Official Charts)	4
US Billboard 200	105
US Independent Albums (Billboard)	26
US Top Hard Rock Albums (Billboard)	5
US Heatseekers Albums (Billboard)	1
US Top Rock Albums (Billboard)	38
