= By a Thread: Live in London 2011 =

By a Thread – Live in London 2011
- Cover

Live album by Devin Townsend Project
- Released: June 18, 2012
- Recorded: November 10–13, 2011
- Genres: Progressive metal, industrial metal, extreme metal, alternative metal, progressive rock, ambient, new-age
- Label: HevyDevy
- Producer: Devin Townsend

Devin Townsend chronology
Contain Us (2011)	By a Thread – Live in London 2011 (2012)	Epicloud (2012)

Professional ratings
Review scores
Source	Rating
About.com	4/5 stars

By a Thread – Live in London 2011 is a 9-disc live album by the Devin Townsend Project, released on June 18, 2012, in Europe, and June 19, 2012, in North America. It includes live material recorded in November 2011, from four Devin Townsend Project concerts held in London, England. The idea of the live video compilation was revealed in March 2011 and detailed a year later.

== Background and contents ==
The material for the box set was recorded at four Devin Townsend Project concerts, each entitled "An Evening with the Devin Townsend Project". Each concert featured one of the first four Devin Townsend Project albums performed in their entirety. The Ki, Addicted, and Deconstruction concerts were held at the University of London Union, and the Ghost concert was held at the Union Chapel.

The box set contains four DVDs, each featuring a concert, and four CDs containing the audio from the concerts. A fifth CD contains the audio of the encores played during the concerts. The box set is limited to 5,000 copies worldwide but remains available digitally. Due to its rarity in physical formats, By a thread has been selling for high prices on eBay with prices ranging from $200 to as high as $1,000.

== Track listing ==
=== Ki ===
1. "A Monday"
2. "Coast"
3. "Disruptr"
4. "Gato"
5. "Terminal"
6. "Heaven's End"
7. "Ain't Never Gonna Win"
8. "Winter"
9. "Trainfire"
10. "Lady Helen"
11. "Ki"
12. "Quiet Riot"
13. "Demon League"
14. "Coast" (Take 2)
15. "Synchronicity Freaks"
16. "Deep Peace"

DVD 1 Extras:

- Ki photo slide show
- Devin commentary
- "Coast" video

=== Addicted ===
1. "Addicted!"
2. "Universe in a Ball!"
3. "Bend It Like Bender!"
4. "Supercrush!"
5. "Hyperdrive!"
6. "Resolve!"
7. "Ih-Ah!"
8. "The Way Home!"
9. "Numbered!"
10. "Awake!"
11. "Pixilate"
12. "Life"
13. "Kingdom"

DVD 2 Extras:

- Addicted photo slide show
- Devin's show commentary
- "Bend It Like Bender" video

=== Deconstruction ===
1. "Praise the Lowered"
2. "Stand"
3. "Juular"
4. "Planet of the Apes"
5. "Sumeria"
6. "The Mighty Masturbator"
7. "Pandemic"
8. "Deconstruction"
9. "Poltergeist"
10. "Fake Punk"
11. "Wallet Chain"
12. "Metal Dilemma"

DVD 3 Extras:

- Deconstruction photo slide show
- Devin's show commentary
- "Juular" video

=== Ghost ===
1. "Fly"
2. "Heart Baby" / "Saloon" (indexed separately on CD)
3. "Feather"
4. "Kawaii"
5. "Ghost"
6. "Blackberry"
7. "Monsoon"
8. "Texada"
9. "Seams"
10. "Infinite Ocean"
11. "As You Were"
12. "Fall"
13. "Radial Highway"
14. "Watch You"

DVD 4 Extras:

- Ghost photo slide show
- Devin's show commentary
- "Kawaii" video
- Ghost show day feature
- By a Thread - interview
- Barcode and Other Identifiers

== Charts ==
Weekly chart performance for By a Thread: Live in London 2011
Chart (2012)	Peak position
Finnish Albums (Suomen virallinen lista)	12
US Heatseekers Albums (Billboard)	16
Chart (2020)	Peak position
German Albums (Offizielle Top 100)	66
