= Ghost (Devin Townsend Project album) =

Studio album by Devin Townsend Project
- Released: June 20, 2011
- Recorded: 2010–2011
- Studio: The Factory and The Shit Shack
- Genre: Progressive rock; new-age; ambient
- Length: 72:45
- Label: HevyDevy, Inside Out
- Producer: Devin Townsend

Devin Townsend chronology
| Deconstruction (2011) | Ghost (2011) | Contain Us (2011) |

Alternative cover
- Slipcase cover

Ghost is the fourteenth studio album by Canadian musician Devin Townsend, and the fourth album in the Devin Townsend Project series. It was released on June 20, 2011, simultaneously with the third Devin Townsend Project album Deconstruction. Townsend has stated that the album "is the mellowest (by far) and prettiest record I've done so far".

Ghost was performed in its entirety once, on November 13, 2011, at the Union Chapel in London, England. The performance was filmed and recorded for the By a Thread – Live in London 2011 CD/DVD box set, along with performances of the other 3 Devin Townsend Project albums (up to that point).

The song "Drench", a leftover slated to appear on a second volume of Ghost, was shared by Townsend on his official SoundCloud account. Later, Mackie Gear posted the leftover track "Fall" on SoundCloud.

== Reception ==
Professional ratings
Review scores
| Source | Rating |
|---|---|
| About.com | 3.5/5 stars |
| Allmusic | 3.5/5 stars |
| Blistering | 8/10 |
| Chronicles of Chaos | 9/10 |
| Exclaim! | Favourable |
| Metal Hammer | 9/10 |
| Metal Injection | 8.5/10 |
| Sputnikmusic | 5/5 |

The album was well received by Metal Hammer, who said, "Ghost could be the most convincing album of his career".

== Track listing ==
All tracks are written by Devin Townsend, except where noted.

| No. | Title | Length |
|---|---|---|
| 1. | "Fly" | 4:15 |
| 2. | "Heart Baby" | 5:55 |
| 3. | "Feather" | 11:30 |
| 4. | "Kawaii" | 2:52 |
| 5. | "Ghost" | 6:24 |
| 6. | "Blackberry" | 4:53 |
| 7. | "Monsoon" (Townsend, Kat Epple, Dave Young) | 4:37 |
| 8. | "Dark Matters" | 1:57 |
| 9. | "Texada" | 9:30 |
| 10. | "Seams" | 4:04 |
| 11. | "Infinite Ocean" (Townsend, Young, Mike St-Jean) | 8:01 |
| 12. | "As You Were" | 8:47 |

iTunes exclusive bonus track
| No. | Title | Length |
|---|---|---|
| 13. | "Radial Highway" | 6:49 |

== Ghost 2 ==
Ghost 2 was an album intended for release in September 2011. As Ghost was originally to be a double album, but ultimately released as a single disc, Ghost 2 would have included tracks that weren't released on Ghost. Townsend has stated that these tracks were "too dark" and "heavier" than the rest of Ghost and therefore didn't fit with the intended vibe. On August 22, 2012, Townsend officially cancelled Ghost 2, saying, "I tried to finish Ghost 2 the other day, but it's not solid enough. Doesn't engage. Going to use the best bits and art for elements of Z²." Some of these songs were eventually released on the bonus disc included with Casualties of Cool.

== Personnel ==
- Devin Townsend – guitars, vocals, bass, synth, ambience, banjo, production, mixing, engineering, design, layout
- Kat Epple – flute, woodwinds
- Dave Young – keyboards, Nord synths, harmonium, Ableton Live, mandolin
- Mike St-Jean – drums, percussion
- Katrina Natale – vocals
- Sheldon Zaharko – bed tracks engineering
- Troy – mastering
- Ryab Dahle – additional engineering
- Ryan Van Poederooyen – drum tech
- Jean Savoie – bass tech
- Brian Kibbons – photos
- Travis Smith – design, layout

== Charts ==
Weekly chart performance for Ghost
| Chart (2011) | Peak position |
|---|---|
| US Heatseekers Albums (Billboard) | 12 |

Weekly chart performance for Calm and the Storm (box set including Deconstruction and Ghost)
| Chart (2011) | Peak position |
|---|---|
| Finnish Albums (Suomen virallinen lista) | 15 |
| US Top Hard Rock Albums (Billboard) | 20 |
| US Heatseekers Albums (Billboard) | 7 |
| US Independent Albums (Billboard) | 40 |
| US Top Current Album Sales (Billboard) | 167 |
