= Addicted (Devin Townsend Project album) =

Studio album by Devin Townsend Project
- Released: November 17, 2009
- Recorded: May 6 – September 8, 2009
- Genres: Alternative metal; pop metal; progressive metal
- Length: 46:49
- Labels: HevyDevy, InsideOut Music
- Producer: Devin Townsend

Devin Townsend chronology
| Ki (2009) | Addicted (2009) | Deconstruction (2011) |

Alternative cover
- Slipcase cover

Professional ratings
Review scores
| Source | Rating |
|---|---|
| About.com | 3/5 stars |
| Allmusic | 4/5 stars |
| Blistering | 8.5/10 |
| BraveWords | 9/10 |
| Chronicles of Chaos | 4/10 |
| Metal Storm | 9/10 |
| mX | 4/5 stars |
| Rock Sound | 9/10 |

Addicted is the twelfth studio album by Canadian musician Devin Townsend, and the second album in the Devin Townsend Project series. The album was released on November 17, 2009, on Townsend's independent record label HevyDevy Records. The album was written and produced by Townsend, and features Ryan Van Poederooyen, Brian Waddell, Mark Cimino, and Anneke van Giersbergen.

== Background ==
Addicted is the second of seven albums in the Devin Townsend Project series, each featuring a different lineup and theme. Addicted was written and produced by Townsend. The album features vocals by Townsend along with Anneke van Giersbergen, former singer of Dutch band The Gathering. Brian Waddell and Ryan Van Poederooyen of the former Devin Townsend Band play bass and drums, respectively, while Mark Cimino plays guitar alongside Townsend. Recording for the album began May 6, 2009. The next album in the series is Deconstruction, which was released on June 20, 2011.

== Music ==
According to Townsend, Addicted is an album of "melodic" and "danceable" music. He compared the album's songwriting to his more accessible songs, such as "Life" from Ocean Machine: Biomech (1997), "Stagnant" from Terria (2001), and "Material" from Physicist (2000). The album's production style was directly influenced by Nickelback's 2008 album Dark Horse. Townsend has quipped that "Some parts of it sound like Meshuggah, some parts of it sound like Boney M."

Addicted includes a new version of the song "Hyperdrive" from Townsend's album Ziltoid the Omniscient (2007), with lead vocals by van Giersbergen, who has performed a cover of the song with her former band Agua de Annique. "Resolve!" was "directly influenced by The Wildhearts" and it bears a resemblance to "Vanilla Radio" from The Wildhearts Must Be Destroyed.

Unlike Townsend's previous albums, which were usually in open C tuning, most of the songs on Addicted were played in open B tuning. "Universe in a Ball!" was played in open B♭, "Hyperdrive!" in open C♯ (to accommodate the vocal range of van Giersbergen, as opposed to the version of "Hyperdrive" that appeared on the album Ziltoid the Omniscient which was recorded in C), and "Ih-Ah!" and "The Way Home!" in open C.

== Release and artwork ==
Addicted was released on Townsend's independent record label HevyDevy Records on November 17, 2009, through their website. Pre-orders went on sale October 6, 2009, with special-edition packages through Century Media's CM Distro website. The album was released on November 13, 2009, in Germany, November 16, 2009, in the rest of Europe, and November 17, 2009, in North America by InsideOut Music. It was released in Japan through Marquee/Avalon on December 16, 2009.

The album features art by Travis Smith, who created the album art for Townsend's previous albums Terria and Accelerated Evolution. The InsideOut releases are sold in a slipcase bearing Smith's Devin Townsend Project logo.

== Track listing ==
All tracks are written by Devin Townsend, except where noted.

| No. | Title | Length |
|---|---|---|
| 1. | "Addicted!" | 5:37 |
| 2. | "Universe in a Ball!" | 4:09 |
| 3. | "Bend It Like Bender!" | 3:37 |
| 4. | "Supercrush!" | 5:13 |
| 5. | "Hyperdrive!" | 3:36 |
| 6. | "Resolve!" | 3:12 |
| 7. | "Ih-Ah!" | 3:45 |
| 8. | "The Way Home!" (Devin Townsend, Brian Waddell) | 3:14 |
| 9. | "Numbered!" | 4:55 |
| 10. | "Awake!!" | 9:44 |
| Total length: | | 46:49 |

== Personnel ==
=== Musicians ===
- Devin Townsend – vocals, guitar, keyboards, programming, production, mixing
- Ryan Van Poederooyen – drums
- Brian "Beav" Waddell – bass
- Mark Cimino – guitar

=== Additional personnel ===
- Anneke van Giersbergen – additional vocals, lead vocals on "Supercrush!", "Hyperdrive!", "Resolve!" and "Numbered!"
- Dave Young – additional keyboards
- Susanne Richter – additional vocals on "Ih-Ah!"
- Rob Cunningham, Hugh Gilmartin, John Rafferty, Brian Johnson, Steve Lobmeier; Devin Townsend, Brian "Beav" Waddell, Ryan Van Poederooyen and Mark Cimino – gang vocals
- Travis Smith – art

== Charts ==
Weekly chart performance for Addicted
| Chart (2009) | Peak position |
|---|---|
| Finnish Albums (Suomen virallinen lista) | 36 |
| US Heatseekers Albums (Billboard) | 2 |
| US Independent Albums (Billboard) | 22 |
| US Top Current Album Sales (Billboard) | 168 |
