= The Hummer =

Studio album by Devin Townsend
- Released: November 15, 2006
- Genre: Ambient, noise
- Length: 73:24
- Label: HevyDevy
- Producer: Devin Townsend

Devin Townsend chronology
The New Black (2006)	The Hummer (2006)	Ziltoid the Omniscient (2007)

Devin Townsend solo/band chronology
Synchestra (2006)	The Hummer (2006)	Ziltoid the Omniscient (2007)

The Hummer is the ninth solo album by Canadian musician Devin Townsend, and his second ambient album. It was released on Townsend's label, HevyDevy Records, on November 15, 2006.

== Music ==
The album chiefly consists of interwoven low frequency sounds, flute, morse code and ocean sounds, as well as audio samples from sources such as a reading by Leonard Cohen of part of the Tibetan Book of the Dead, Ravi Shankar, and the science fiction film Contact (1997). This is a quiet, reflective work in the vein of meditative music, and provides a stark antithesis to the aggressive heavy metal stance adopted by one of Townsend's other projects - Strapping Young Lad. Townsend describes it as "much more user friendly than the Devlab...still; some people are going to think it's just buzzing and humming noises, so again...it's not for everybody."

== Track listing ==
All tracks are written by Devin Townsend

No.	Title	Length
1.	"The Hummer"	15:55
2.	"Arc"	23:04
3.	"Consciousness Causes Collapse"	6:39
4.	"Equation"	3:16
5.	"The Abacus"	8:03
6.	"Cosmic Surf"	16:27
Total length:		73:24

== Personnel ==
- Devin Townsend – music
- Jeff Feinstein – flute
- Konrad Palkiewicz – artwork and layout
