= Ki (album) =

- The cover of Ki is a 3-D illustration by Konrad Palkiewicz.

Studio album by Devin Townsend Project
- Released: May 25, 2009
- Recorded: 2008 – 2009 at Devestate, Studio D, and the Factory
- Genres: Progressive rock; jazz rock; psychedelic blues
- Length: 66:50
- Label: HevyDevy
- Producer: Devin Townsend

Devin Townsend chronology
Ziltoid the Omniscient (2007)	Ki (2009)	Addicted (2009)

Devin Townsend overall chronology
1994–2006 Chaos Years (2008)	Ki (2009)	Addicted (2009)

Alternative cover
- The international InsideOut release of Ki is sold in a green slipcase bearing the Devin Townsend Project logo, designed by Travis Smith.

Ki (/ˈkiː/ KEE) is the eleventh studio album by Canadian musician Devin Townsend, and the first album in the Devin Townsend Project series. The album was released on May 25, 2009, on Townsend's independent record label HevyDevy Records.

Townsend, the founder, songwriter, and frontman of extreme metal band Strapping Young Lad and progressive metal group The Devin Townsend Band, dissolved both bands in 2006 to spend time with his family and avoid the burnout of touring and interviewing. After a period of self-discovery and a year-long break from songwriting, Townsend began work on a four-album series to clarify his identity as a musician. Ki includes themes of self-control and sobriety, and is musically subtler than much of the artist's previous work, consisting of ambient rock music interlaced with tentative bursts of heavy metal.

The album was written, produced, mixed, and co-engineered by Townsend, who also performed guitar and vocals. Townsend assembled a supporting group of Vancouver musicians including blues drummer Duris Maxwell, rock bassist Jean Savoie, keyboardist Dave Young, and guest vocalist Ché Aimee Dorval to play on the album. While some critics found the album uneven, Ki received generally positive reviews for its unexpected musical direction, along with its production, vocal dynamics, and mix of influences.

== Background ==
After disbanding his extreme metal band Strapping Young Lad and his progressive metal project The Devin Townsend Band in 2006, Townsend shaved off his trademark "skullet" hairstyle and gave up alcohol and marijuana. Townsend found it "disconcerting" that he had difficulty writing music without drugs, and that he had trouble identifying his purpose as a musician. He spent a year producing albums in absence of writing, but found it unrewarding and decided to "pick up the guitar and just write." This began a period of self-discovery where he learned "how to create without drugs".

Over two years, Townsend wrote over 60 songs, and found that they fit into "four distinct styles". In March 2009, Townsend announced his plans for a four-album series called the Devin Townsend Project, with the goal of clarifying his musical identity and being "accountable" for the persona he projects to the public. Ki, the first album of the Devin Townsend Project, is written to "set the stage" for the subsequent albums. The word "ki" represents the Japanese concept of "life force" (氣, "ki"). Townsend chose the name as an homage to the 1981 Kitarō album of the same name, which he "loved as a kid".

The project's concept includes a different group of musicians for each album. For Ki, Townsend chose a group of musicians with whom he had not previously worked. He discovered Duris Maxwell, a blues drummer who has played with such acts as Heart, Jefferson Airplane, and Tommy Chong, in a blues club in northern Canada. Townsend was impressed by his energy and recruited him for Ki. Townsend also chose Jean Savoie, a music store employee who plays in a Beatles cover band, to play bass on the album. Maxwell and Savoie were ideal for the album, Townsend explained, because they had little experience playing heavy music, and had a fresh perspective that fit with Ki's subtler sound. Townsend also brought back Dave Young, an ambient keyboardist who had played in The Devin Townsend Band, and recruited Vancouver artist Ché Aimee Dorval as a vocalist on several tracks. The album was primarily recorded, produced, and mixed from late 2008 to early 2009 at Devestate and Studio D; the drums were recorded at Factory Studios in Vancouver.

== Music and lyrical themes ==
Townsend channelled his new-found self-control and sobriety into Ki, a "restrained, melodic, and tranquil" album that is "a sharp contrast" to the heavy metal he is known for, while maintaining his "signature sound". The album features undistorted guitar tones, live takes, no drum triggering, and relatively quiet mastering, with a musical style combining ambient, progressive rock, jazz rock, and psychedelic blues. The album's recurring musical theme is "tension and release", a gradual build in intensity which suddenly stops and gives way to "something relaxing". The album's musical style has been compared to Porcupine Tree, Chroma Key, and Pink Floyd, with Townsend's vocals drawing comparisons to Steven Wilson and Steve Hackett.

Ki was mixed by Townsend, and features very little compression, in contrast with his usual wall-of-sound production style. Townsend explained that he originally "tried doing the wall-of-sound with it and it just kind of ruined it...it turned it into a not-so-good Strapping record." The album deliberately eschews the loudness wars, the recent music industry practice of competitively mastering audio to seem as loud as possible. "I officially pull my hat out of the loudness wars", Townsend told his mastering engineer. The album's songs were primarily written in open C tuning, except for "A Monday", "Trainfire", and "Disruptr" in open B, "Heaven's End" and "Winter" in open B♭, and "Quiet Riot" in standard tuning. Townsend has cited Second Nature by The Young Gods, Paul Horn, Chants of India by Ravi Shankar, and Ween as influences on the album.

"Lady Helen"
On tracks such as "Lady Helen", Ki features subtle music and quiet mastering compared to many of Townsend's previous releases.

Townsend described Ki as both the introduction and the moral to the "larger concept" of the Devin Townsend Project. The album's lyrical themes explore Townsend's inner demons, past addictions, self-acceptance, and his "newfound ability to say no." The album opens with a brief instrumental that leads into "Coast", a quiet, bass-driven track that sets the stage for the album as a "metaphor for Devin's newfound restraint." Townsend described it as "the intro to the story, quiet, dark, haunted and unsure". The track builds in intensity toward the end with layers of vocals, but rather than exploding into Strapping Young Lad–style metal, fades into "loose, bluesy guitar work". "Disruptr" has been described as "a coffee-house metal track", contrasting light instrumentation with heavy metal–style songwriting and vocals in a way that one critic compared to Talking Heads. "Gato" proceeds in a similar vein, but is set apart with backing vocals by Dorval. "Disruptr" and "Gato" continue the musical theme; each song builds in intensity toward the end but "stops and takes a deep breath" before proceeding. The album then fades into "Terminal", an atmospheric track with quiet vocals that was co-written by keyboardist Dave Young.

Townsend's restraint reaches a breaking point on "Heaven's End", which Jon Wiederhorn of Revolver described as "a groovy pop song that morphs into a violent, acid-drenched nightmare." It is followed by "Ain't Never Gonna Win", a live studio jam by the album's four musicians which was described by David E. Gehlke of the online magazine Blistering as "trippy". "Trainfire", a classic country–style song inspired by Elvis Presley's cover of "Mystery Train", addresses Townsend's former addiction to pornography, which he described as "this crazy, crack cocaine on the internet that nobody wants to talk about." The song continues the album's theme of honesty and self-acceptance, both about pornography and musical tastes. Townsend explained the song's musical style, saying "yes, I like heavy music and am good at making it, but that is not all that I listen to, and that is not all that I want to play."

The album's climax is found in the title track, described by the artist as "a personal breakthrough" and is initially born out of a Grey Skies demo, "Soft," previously released on Ass-Sordid Demos II. "Ki" builds into a cyclical progression of arpeggios which Martin Popoff of Brave Words & Bloody Knuckles described as the album's "proggiest" moment. It leads into "Quiet Riot", an acoustic version of "Cum On Feel the Noize" with new lyrics. "Quiet Riot", Townsend explained, "basically sums up the idea that, although I am 'damaged,' I'm fine, and have chosen to make my life better."

== Release and artwork ==
Ki was released on Townsend's independent record label HevyDevy Records on May 25, 2009, in Canada. It was released May 22, 2009, in Germany, May 25, 2009, in the rest of Europe, and June 16, 2009, in the United States by distributor InsideOut Music. A Japanese release on Marquee/Avalon was released on August 26, 2009. When all four albums in the series were completed, Townsend released an eight-disc special edition box set, including a DVD and various bonus material. This box set, named Contain Us, was released on December 9, 2011.

The album art was created by artist Konrad Palkiewicz, who created the art for Townsend's ambient album The Hummer (2006) and directed the video for Strapping Young Lad's "Almost Again". The album art was designed to be viewed with a pair of 3-D glasses. The album cover is an image of "two faces in one". Though "not authentic", it is based on Native American and Chinese art. Palkiewicz directed a music video for the song "Coast", which was released on Townsend's website on July 28, 2009. The InsideOut releases come with an extra lyrics sheet and feature a green slipcase bearing the Devin Townsend Project logo, designed by Travis Smith.

== Sales and critical reception ==
Professional ratings
Review scores
Source	Rating
Allmusic	3.5/5 stars
Blabbermouth.net	7.5/10
Blistering	7.5/10
BraveWords	8/10
Chronicles of Chaos	9.5/10
Decibel	7/10 stars
Metal Hammer	8/10
Rock Sound	7/10
Revolver	3/5
Sputnikmusic	3.5/5

Ki reached number 26 on the Finnish Top 40 and number 179 on the French Top 200, and appeared on the UK Indie and UK Rock charts. It sold 800 copies in its first week of release in the United States, and debuted at number 69 on the Billboard Top Heatseekers chart. Critical reception of the album was generally positive. Jon Wiederhorn of Revolver said the album is "well worth a listen" and praised the heavier tracks such as "Disruptr" and "Heaven Send", saying, "Townsend mostly contains his rage, but he's at his best when he loses it." Martin Popoff of Brave Words & Bloody Knuckles found the album to have an "odd identity", with "all sorts of things going on just under the surface" that rewarded multiple listens. David E. Gehlke of Blistering was less impressed, and found the album inconsistent. Gehlke described "Winter" as "lush and gorgeous", but felt that the album "fails to hit the mark" at other points, such as "Ain't Never Gonna Win" and "Trainfire". Tyler Munro of Sputnikmusic said Ki showed Townsend "at his loosest and most dynamic", and praised Townsend's and Dorval's vocals, but felt the album was held back by musical repetition and its extended guitar jams. Greg Prato of Allmusic gave the album a moderate review, admiring Townsend's unpredictability but feeling the album was not "the most gripping or groundbreaking album" in Townsend's collection. Daniel Cairns of Chronicles of Chaos praised Ki as "a difficult, unusual collection of music" that "also might just be Townsend's best yet."

== Track listing ==
All tracks are written by Devin Townsend except where noted.

No.	Title	Length
1.	"A Monday"	1:43
2.	"Coast"	4:36
3.	"Disruptr"	5:49
4.	"Gato"	5:23
5.	"Terminal" (Townsend, Young)	6:58
6.	"Heaven's End"	8:54
7.	"Ain't Never Gonna Win" (Townsend, Maxwell, Savoie, Young)	3:17
8.	"Winter"	4:48
9.	"Trainfire"	5:59
10.	"Lady Helen"	6:05
11.	"Ki"	7:21
12.	"Quiet Riot"	3:02
13.	"Demon League (Bonus Track)"	2:55
Total length:		66:50

== Personnel ==
=== Musicians ===
- Devin Townsend – vocals, guitar, fretless bass guitar, ambience, programming, production, mixing, engineering
- Duris Maxwell – drums
- Jean Savoie – bass guitar
- Dave Young – keys, piano, ambience

=== Additional musicians ===
- Ché Aimee Dorval – additional vocals
- Ryan Dahle – additional vocals ("Gato")
- Bjorn Strid, Peter, Christopher, Grant, Corey, Jeremy, Ryan – additional vocals

=== Production ===
- Adrian Mottrim – recording assistance
- Mike St. Jean – preproduction assistance
- Brennan Chambers – mixing assistance
- Sheldon Zaharko – recording
- Ryan Dahle – production, mixing ("Quiet Riot")
- T-Roy – mastering

=== Release ===
- Konrad J. Palkiewicz – visual consulting, layout, artwork
- Erich Saide – photography
- Omer Cordell – photography
- Jeff Cohen – legal, management
- Mike Mowery – legal, management

== Charts ==
Chart	Provider	Peak position
Finnish Albums Chart	YLE	26
French Albums Chart	SNEP	179
UK Indie Chart	OCC	22
UK Rock Chart	OCC	31
U.S. Top Heatseekers Chart	Billboard	69
