= Transcendence (Devin Townsend Project album) =

Studio album by Devin Townsend Project
- Released: September 9, 2016
- Recorded: March 27 – May 2016
- Studio: Armoury Studios
- Genres: Progressive metal; symphonic metal
- Length: 64:16
- Label: HevyDevy
- Producers: Devin Townsend, Adam "Nolly" Getgood

Devin Townsend Project chronology
| Z² (2014) | Transcendence (2016) | Ocean Machine - Live at the Ancient Roman Theatre Plovdiv (2018) |

Professional ratings
Aggregate scores
| Source | Rating |
|---|---|
| Metacritic | 78/100 |
Review scores
| Source | Rating |
| AllMusic | 4/5 stars |
| Kerrang! | 4/5 |
| Metal Injection | 9/10 |
| Record Collector | 4/5 stars |
| Sputnikmusic | 3/5 |

Transcendence is the seventeenth studio album by Canadian musician Devin Townsend. It is the seventh and final album in the Devin Townsend Project series. It was released on September 9, 2016, via HevyDevy Records.

== Background ==
Transcendence is the first Devin Townsend album not to be produced solely by Townsend, by featuring ex-Periphery member Adam "Nolly" Getgood as additional producer, engineer and mixer. By Townsend's request, the other musicians' input to songs, arrangements and production is also greater than on previous Devin Townsend albums.

The first song on the album, "Truth", is a re-recorded version of a song that appeared for the first time on Devin Townsend's solo album Infinity, while the bonus disc includes a re-recording of the song "Victim", from Physicist. The song "Stars" was publicly demoed during a live stream sponsored by Toontrack. The album also includes a cover of Ween's song "Transdermal Celebration" from the album quebec.

The album entered the UK official charts at number 26 on September 16, 2016, after entering the mid-week update chart at 16.

== Track listing ==
All lyrics are written by Devin Townsend, except where noted.

| No. | Title | Music | Length |
|---|---|---|---|
| 1. | "Truth" | Townsend | 4:47 |
| 2. | "Stormbending" | Townsend, Dave Young, Brian Waddell, Ryan Van Poederooyen, Mike St-Jean | 5:22 |
| 3. | "Failure" | Townsend, Young, Waddell, Van Poederooyen, St-Jean | 6:02 |
| 4. | "Secret Sciences" | Townsend, Young, Waddell, Van Poederooyen, St-Jean | 7:28 |
| 5. | "Higher" | Townsend, Young, Waddell, Van Poederooyen, St-Jean | 9:40 |
| 6. | "Stars" | Townsend | 4:17 |
| 7. | "Transcendence" | Townsend, Young, Waddell, Van Poederooyen, St-Jean | 5:54 |
| 8. | "Offer Your Light" | Townsend | 3:57 |
| 9. | "From the Heart" (Townsend, Kagel) | Townsend, Kagel | 8:23 |
| 10. | "Transdermal Celebration" (Ween cover) (Dave Dreiwitz, Josh Freese, Glenn McClelland, Dean Ween, Gene Ween) | Dreiwitz, Freese, McClelland, D. Ween, G. Ween | 8:26 |
| Total length: | | | 64:16 |

Vinyl edition bonus tracks
| No. | Title | Length |
|---|---|---|
| 11. | "Gump" | 5:24 |
| 12. | "Loud" | 3:23 |

Japanese edition bonus tracks
| No. | Title | Length |
|---|---|---|
| 11. | "Sophie's Boobies" (demo) | 0:50 |
| 12. | "Young Gods" (demo) | 4:47 |
| 13. | "Wolves" (demo) | 3:24 |

Holding Patterns (deluxe edition bonus CD)
| No. | Title | Length |
|---|---|---|
| 1. | "Gump" | 5:24 |
| 2. | "Celestial Signals" (demo) | 5:02 |
| 3. | "Support the Cause" (demo) | 4:31 |
| 4. | "Into the Sun" (demo) | 3:11 |
| 5. | "Time Overload" (demo) | 4:00 |
| 6. | "Lexus" (demo) | 5:14 |
| 7. | "Farther On" (demo) | 2:51 |
| 8. | "Victim" (demo, originally from Physicist) | 3:09 |
| 9. | "Monkey Mind" (demo) | 3:52 |
| 10. | "Canucklehead" (demo) | 2:09 |
| 11. | "Loud" | 3:23 |
| Total length: | | 42:52 |

== Personnel ==
Devin Townsend Project

- Devin Townsend – guitars, vocals, bass, keyboards, programming
- Dave Young – guitars, keyboards
- Brian Waddell – bass
- Ryan Van Poederooyen – drums
- Mike St-Jean – keyboards

Additional personnel

- Anneke van Giersbergen – vocals
- Ché Aimee Dorval – vocals

Other staff

- Devin Townsend – production
- Adam "Nolly" Getgood – additional production, engineering
- Ermin Hamidovic – mastering
- Anthony Clarkson – cover art

== Charts ==
| Chart (2016) | Peak position |
|---|---|
| Australian Albums (ARIA) | 10 |
| Austrian Albums (Ö3 Austria) | 49 |
| Belgian Albums (Ultratop Flanders) | 52 |
| Belgian Albums (Ultratop Wallonia) | 51 |
| Dutch Albums (Album Top 100) | 43 |
| Finnish Albums (Suomen virallinen lista) | 2 |
| French Albums (SNEP) | 56 |
| German Albums (Offizielle Top 100) | 43 |
| New Zealand Heatseeker Albums (RMNZ) | 6 |
| Scottish Albums (Official Charts) | 21 |
| Swiss Albums (Schweizer Hitparade) | 33 |
| UK Albums (Official Charts) | 26 |
| US Billboard 200 | 117 |
