= Synchestra =

Studio album by The Devin Townsend Band
- Released: January 31, 2006
- Recorded: 2005 at the Devlab, Armoury Studios, and Hipposonic
- Genres: Progressive metal; progressive rock; heavy metal
- Length: 65:20
- Label: HevyDevy
- Producer: Devin Townsend

The Devin Townsend Band chronology
| Accelerated Evolution (2003) | Synchestra (2006) |

Devin Townsend chronology
| Devlab (2004) | Synchestra (2006) | The New Black (2006) |

Synchestra (/sɪŋˈkɛstrə/ sing-KES-trə) is the eighth solo album by Canadian musician Devin Townsend, and the second and final album he recorded with The Devin Townsend Band. The album was released in January 2006 on Townsend's label, HevyDevy Records.

== Background ==
After releasing four solo albums under the name Devin Townsend, each with a different recording lineup, Townsend decided in 2002 to assemble a permanent band for his solo material. He formed the Devin Townsend Band, consisting of Brian Waddell on guitar, Mike Young on bass, Ryan Van Poederooyen on drums, and Dave Young on keyboards. The newly formed group released their first album, Accelerated Evolution, in March 2003. The group recorded and toured for the album while Townsend's extreme metal project, Strapping Young Lad, were doing the same for their third release, Strapping Young Lad. With Chris Valagao Mina, guitarist, backing vocal.

At the end of a whirlwind year, Townsend began working on Strapping Young Lad's fourth album, Alien, in March 2004. Feeling that Strapping Young Lad did not live up to expectations, Townsend decided to take the next album to a new extreme. To prepare for Alien, Townsend stopped taking the medication prescribed to treat his bipolar disorder. "I think that as an artist, in order for me to get to the next plateau, I kind of feel the need to explore things and sometimes that exploration leads you to places that are a little crazy," he explained. "And Alien was no exception with that."

Shortly after the release of Alien in March 2005, Townsend began putting together the next Devin Townsend Band record with the working title Human, intended as the more "pleasant" counterpart to Alien. The album was ultimately entitled Synchestra, and was "basically a record about coming back down to earth after being in space with Alien for a while," according to Townsend.

Synchestra was primarily recorded and mixed by Townsend at his home studio, the Devlab. Van Poederooyen's drums were recorded at Armoury Studios in Vancouver, BC. Mike Young's bass recording, and the album's final mixing, took place at Hipposonic Studios in Vancouver. The album was engineered by Shaun Thingvold, who had also worked for Strapping Young Lad and Fear Factory.

== Music ==
Townsend showcased a wide variety of musical styles in Synchestra, blending his trademark "pop metal" with influences from folk, polka, and Middle Eastern music, with "a few headbanging elements" mixed in. Bassist Mike Young and guitarist Brian Waddell share vocals on the bonus song "Sunshine and Happiness". Keyboardist Dave Young also plays guitar on "Sunshine and Happiness" and "Sunset". "Triumph" contains a country breakdown based on "On the Pipe" by Steve Morse from the album The Introduction, and also features a solo by Steve Vai, for whom Townsend performed lead vocals on the album Sex & Religion.

Because the album is considered a single piece, several tracks recall themes played earlier in the record; in addition, "Judgement" would later be referenced in "Polyphony" from SYL's The New Black.

== Release ==
Synchestra was released on January 31, 2006. The album was released on Townsend's label HevyDevy Records in North America, and InsideOut in Europe. A two-disc special edition was released simultaneously with the standard edition. The special edition includes an in-studio live DVD titled "Safe Zone" containing eight tracks played live in the studio and some bonus features put together by the band. The special edition was released in digipak and jewel-case formats. A music video was produced for the song "Vampira".

== Reception ==
Professional ratings
Review scores
| Source | Rating |
|---|---|
| About.com | 4.5/5 stars |
| Allmusic | 3.5/5 stars |
| Blabbermouth.net | 9/10 |
| BraveWords | 9/10 |
| Chronicles of Chaos | 8/10 |

Synchestra received favorable reviews from critics. Greg Prato of Allmusic praised the album's diversity and originality, remarking that "Townsend seems to be getting more musically daring with each subsequent release, unlike some other veteran rockers who start to play it safe as the years roll on." Scott Alisoglu of Blabbermouth.net compared the album favorably to Accelerated Evolution. He wrote that the album has "melodies that are bit more out front" yet is "still as progressive as they come."

== Track listing ==
All tracks are written by Devin Townsend.

| No. | Title | Length |
|---|---|---|
| 1. | "Let It Roll" | 2:52 |
| 2. | "Hypergeek" | 2:20 |
| 3. | "Triumph" | 7:08 |
| 4. | "Babysong" | 5:30 |
| 5. | "Vampolka" | 1:36 |
| 6. | "Vampira" | 3:27 |
| 7. | "Mental Tan" | 2:15 |
| 8. | "Gaia" | 6:03 |
| 9. | "Pixillate" | 8:17 |
| 10. | "Judgement" | 5:55 |
| 11. | "A Simple Lullaby" | 7:09 |
| 12. | "Sunset" | 2:31 |
| 13. | "Notes from Africa" | 7:42 |
| 14. | "Sunshine and Happiness" (hidden track) | 2:35 |
| Total length: | | 65:56 |

Special edition bonus DVD

Safe Zone
| No. | Title | Length |
|---|---|---|
| 1. | "Truth" (from Infinity) | 6:08 |
| 2. | "Regulator" (from Ocean Machine: Biomech) | 5:07 |
| 3. | "Storm" (from Accelerated Evolution) | 4:39 |
| 4. | "Earth Day" (from Terria) | 9:27 |
| 5. | "Life" (from Ocean Machine: Biomech) | 4:25 |
| 6. | "Deadhead" (from Accelerated Evolution) | 9:28 |
| 7. | "Away/Deep Peace Medley" (from Accelerated Evolution/from Terria) | 13:47 |
| 8. | "Slow Me Down" (from Accelerated Evolution) | 4:33 |

== Personnel ==
The Devin Townsend Band

- Devin Townsend – vocals, guitar, programming
- Ryan Van Poederooyen – drums
- Brian Waddell – guitar, additional vocals (track 14)
- Dave Young – keyboards, grand piano, Hammond, mandolin, guitar (track 14), additional vocals (track 14)
- Mike Young – bass, tuba, stand-up bass

Additional musicians

- Heather Robinson – additional vocals
- Deborah Tyzio – additional vocals (track 9)
- Steve Vai – guitar solo (track 3)
- Chris Valagao Mina – guitar, additional vocals
- Daniel Young – tambourine (track 5)
- Rocky Milino Jr. – dobro (3)
- Hansen Thingvold – additional vocals

Production

- Devin Townsend – production, engineering, recording, editing, mixing
- Shaun Thingvold – additional engineering
- Greg Reely – mastering
- Dave Young – recording assistance
- Mike Young – recording assistance
- Jay Van Poederooyen – drum editing
- Bryan Seely – drum teching
- Ash Pearson – drum teching
- Nick Tyzio – vocal recording assistance
- Tim Steinruck – vocal recording assistance

Artwork

- Omer Cordell – photography
- Geoffrey Rousselot – artwork, design

== Charts ==
Weekly chart performance for Synchestra
| Chart (2006) | Peak position |
|---|---|
| Finnish Albums (Suomen virallinen lista) | 33 |
| French Albums (SNEP) | 128 |
| German Albums (Offizielle Top 100) | 85 |
