= 1994–2006 Chaos Years =

Compilation album by Strapping Young Lad
- Released: March 31, 2008
- Recorded: 1994–2006
- Length: 66:29
- Label: Century Media
- Producer: Devin Townsend

Strapping Young Lad chronology
The New Black (2006)	1994–2006 Chaos Years (2008)

Devin Townsend chronology
Ziltoid the Omniscient (2007)	1994–2006 Chaos Years (2008)	Ki (2009)

1994–2006 Chaos Years is a retrospective compilation album from the heavy metal band Strapping Young Lad. The album contains tracks from all of the band's studio albums, as well as a DVD with live footage and music videos. The album had a European release on March 31, 2008.

== Track listing ==
All lyrics are written by Devin Townsend; all music is composed by Strapping Young Lad (Devin Townsend, Jed Simon, Byron Stroud, and Gene Hoglan), except where noted.

No.	Title	Music	Length
1.	"S.Y.L."	Townsend, Adrian White	4:47
2.	"In the Rainy Season"	Townsend, White	4:37
3.	"Velvet Kevorkian"	Townsend	1:17
4.	"All Hail the New Flesh"	Townsend	5:24
5.	"Oh My Fucking God"	Townsend	3:34
6.	"Detox"	Townsend	5:37
7.	"Relentless"		3:03
8.	"Rape Song"		3:09
9.	"Aftermath"		6:46
10.	"Imperial"		2:17
11.	"Skeksis"		6:42
12.	"Shitstorm"		4:21
13.	"Love?"		4:53
14.	"You Suck"		2:40
15.	"Wrong Side"		3:35
16.	"Almost Again"		3:43
17.	"Satan's Ice Cream Truck"	Townsend	2:34
Total length:			68:59

- Tracks 1, 2, and 17 are from Heavy as a Really Heavy Thing (1995)
- Tracks 3 to 6 are from City (1997)
- Tracks 7 to 9 are from Strapping Young Lad (2003)
- Tracks 10 to 13 are from Alien (2005)
- Tracks 14 to 16 are from The New Black (2006)

=== DVD ===
Live at the Download Festival - UK - 2006
No.	Title	Length
1.	"Imperial"
2.	"Velvet Kevorkian"
3.	"All Hail the New Flesh"
4.	"Wrong Side"
5.	"Aftermath"
6.	"Love?"
7.	"Polyphony"/"The New Black"
8.	"In the Rainy Season"

More Live Stuff
No.	Title	Length
1.	"S.Y.L." (Live at the Roxy in Hollywood, Los Angeles, 2001)
2.	"Detox" (Live at the Roxy in Hollywood, Los Angeles, 2001)
3.	"Home Nucleonics" (Live at the Commodore Ballroom in Vancouver, Canada, 2004)
4.	"Love?" (Live at the Starland Ballroom, Sayreville, New Jersey, 2005)
5.	"All Hail The New Flesh" (Live at Zeche Carl in Essen, Germany, 2005)
6.	"Skeksis" (Live at the Flame Fest in Bologna, Italy, 2006)

Promo Videos
No.	Title	Length
1.	"S.Y.L."
2.	"Detox"
3.	"Relentless"
4.	"Love?"
5.	"Zen"
6.	"Wrong Side"
7.	"Almost Again"

== Personnel ==
- Gene Hoglan – percussion, drums
- Will Knapp – production
- Dr. Kevin McBride – production
- Jamie Meyer – keyboards
- Jim Parsons – production
- Marcus Rogers – direction, production
- Jed Simon – guitar
- Doug Spangenberg – direction
- Byron Stroud – bass
- Devin Townsend – guitar, vocals, production, mastering, video production, track compilation
- Adrian White – drums
- Dave Young Orchestra – keyboards

== Charts ==
Weekly chart performance for 1994–2006 Chaos Years
Chart (2008)	Peak position
Finnish Albums (Suomen virallinen lista)	32
