= Devlab (album) =

Studio album by Devin Townsend
- Released: December 4, 2004
- Recorded: 2004
- Genres: Ambient, noise, experimental, drone
- Length: 65:56
- Label: HevyDevy Records
- Producer: Devin Townsend

Devin Townsend chronology
Accelerated Evolution (2003)	Devlab (2004)	Alien (2005)

Devin Townsend solo/band chronology
Accelerated Evolution (2003)	Devlab (2004)	Synchestra (2006)

Devlab is the seventh solo album by Canadian musician Devin Townsend, and his first ambient album. It was released on Townsend's label, HevyDevy Records, on December 4, 2004.

== Track listing ==
All music is composed by Devin Townsend.

No.	Title	Length
1.	"Devlab I"	1:07
2.	"Devlab II"	4:10
3.	"Devlab III"	4:21
4.	"Devlab IV"	2:42
5.	"Devlab V"	5:08
6.	"Devlab VI"	5:55
7.	"Devlab VII"	1:42
8.	"Devlab VIII"	4:30
9.	"Devlab IX"	10:17
10.	"Devlab X"	3:48
11.	"Devlab XI"	1:35
12.	"Devlab XII"	4:44
13.	"Devlab XIII"	9:45
14.	"Devlab XIV"	4:11
15.	"Devlab XV"	2:04
Total length:		65:55
