= Deconstruction (Devin Townsend Project album) =

Studio album by Devin Townsend Project
- Released: June 20, 2011
- Recorded: November 2010 – February 2011
- Genre: Progressive metal; avant-garde metal; industrial metal; symphonic metal
- Length: 70:39
- Label: HevyDevy, InsideOut Music
- Producer: Devin Townsend

Devin Townsend chronology
Addicted (2009)	Deconstruction (2011)	Ghost (2011)

Alternative cover
- Slipcase cover

Deconstruction is the thirteenth studio album by Canadian musician Devin Townsend, and the third album in the Devin Townsend Project series. The album was released on June 20, 2011, simultaneously with the fourth Devin Townsend Project album Ghost, on Townsend's independent record label HevyDevy Records. The album features two drummers, Dirk Verbeuren and Ryan Van Poederooyen, as well as a number of guest vocalists. The album's choral and orchestral parts were written and arranged by Townsend using Pro Tools software. The parts were later transcribed into conventional musical notation for the orchestra.

== Concept and musical style ==
According to an interview with Townsend, the album is a concept album focused around a man who is obsessed with finding the true nature of reality. In the process of this journey, he goes to Hell and meets the devil. The devil shows him the secrets of the universe, presenting a cheeseburger to him. However, being a vegetarian, the man cannot eat the cheeseburger, rendering his attempts at working out the true nature of reality pointless. The album is chaotic in nature and has elements which are prominently humorous, which is a radical departure from Townsend's more recent work. Townsend also stated in this interview that Deconstruction is a musical representation of facing your fears and overcoming them. Townsend explained that he wanted the album to have a positive message, despite its highly chaotic nature.

According to Exclaim!'s Laura Wiebe, Deconstruction "draws on the sum of Townsend's musical career and influences, from the eccentricity of his Steve Vai-fronting moment to the theatricality of Infinity and the pulverizing power of Strapping Young Lad." She also noted the various guest contributions from bands such as Cynic and Emperor as clearly having a significant influence on the album's style. In Thompsion Gerhart's review of the album for Sputnik Music he wrote that "If you're new to Devin Townsend, or even if you've been a fan for years, in a way, you could say that Deconstruction is the perfect summary of his works. That is, his early works." Gerhart goes on to note that Deconstruction, Townsend draws from his past work in Strapping Young Lad, his earlier Devin Townsend Project albums, as well as his solo music. "Heavier than anything Devin's done since City and more stacked with musical layers than anything he's done since his now flowering fascination with ProTools, Deconstruction certainly delivers what it promises - layer after layer of Devin to remove, dissect, and analyze."

== Music ==
Several songs reference or are referenced in other Devin Townsend music: "Stand" would be recalled in "Watch You" on Contain Us; "Planet of the Apes" recalls the melody of "A Monday" from Ki; "The Mighty Masturbator" reuses the coda of "Processional" from the Infinity/Christeen + 4 Demos EP.

== Critical reception ==
Professional ratings
Review scores
Source	Rating
About.com	4/5 stars
AllMusic	3.5/5 stars
Chronicles of Chaos	8.5/10
Hour Community	3.5/5 stars
Metal Hammer	9/10
Metal Injection	9.75/10
Rock Hard	8/10
Sputnikmusic	4.5/5

Deconstruction was received with positive reviews from music critics. Metal Hammer described Deconstruction as "easily the most deranged, complex and sonically overwhelming thing he's ever done". Bloody Disgusting's Jonathan Barkan praised the depth and complexity of the album, writing that "It’s astounding and an absolute joy to try and dissect." He concluded that "Deconstruction is quite possibly the closest I’ve ever heard an album come to aural insanity while still being a complete joy to listen to." Exclaim!'s Laura Wiebe likewise noted that "There's so much range and depth that Deconstruction is almost visible and tactile", though she criticised the second half of the album as taking the self-deprecating comedic theme too far, "deliberately sabotaging what might otherwise be verging on brilliance".

In 2021, it was elected by Metal Hammer as the 19th best symphonic metal album.

== Track listing ==
All tracks are written by Devin Townsend

No.	Title	Length
1.	"Praise the Lowered"	6:02
2.	"Stand"	9:36
3.	"Juular"	3:46
4.	"Planet of the Apes"	10:59
5.	"Sumeria"	6:37
6.	"The Mighty Masturbator"	16:28
7.	"Pandemic"	3:29
8.	"Deconstruction"	9:27
9.	"Poltergeist"	4:25

iTunes/deluxe edition bonus track
No.	Title	Length
10.	"Ho Krll"	5:58

== Personnel ==
- Devin Townsend – vocals, guitars, bass, keyboards, programming
- Ryan Van Poederooyen – drums on tracks 1, 2, 4, 6 and 10
- Dirk Verbeuren (Megadeth, ex-Soilwork, Scarve) – drums on tracks 3, 5, 6, 7, 8 and 9
- Paul Kuhr (Novembers Doom) – vocals on "Praise the Lowered"
- Mikael Åkerfeldt (Opeth, ex-Bloodbath) – vocals on "Stand"
- Ihsahn (Emperor) – vocals on "Juular"
- Tommy Giles Rogers (Between the Buried and Me) – vocals on "Planet of the Apes"
- Joe Duplantier (Gojira) – vocals on "Sumeria"
- Paul Masvidal (ex-Death, Cynic) – vocals on "Sumeria"
- Greg Puciato (ex-The Dillinger Escape Plan) – vocals on "The Mighty Masturbator"
- Floor Jansen (ex-After Forever, ReVamp, Nightwish) – soprano vocals on "Pandemic"
- Oderus Urungus (Gwar) – vocals on "Deconstruction"
- Fredrik Thordendal (Meshuggah) – solo on "Deconstruction"
- Florian Magnus Maier (Morean) (The Hungry Gods, Dark Fortress, Noneuclid, Alkaloid) – undertones on "Stand" and "The Mighty Masturbator"
- Prague Philharmonic Orchestra – orchestra

=== Production ===
- Devin Townsend – production, recording, mixing
- Jens Bogren – mixing
- Anthony Clarkson – artwork

== Charts ==
Weekly chart performance for Deconstruction
Chart (2011)	Peak position
US Heatseekers Albums (Billboard)	23

Weekly chart performance for Calm and the Storm (box set including Deconstruction and Ghost)
Chart (2011)	Peak position
Finnish Albums (Suomen virallinen lista)	15
US Top Hard Rock Albums (Billboard)	20
US Heatseekers Albums (Billboard)	7
US Independent Albums (Billboard)	40
US Top Current Album Sales (Billboard)	167
