= Contain Us =

Box set by Devin Townsend Project
- Released: December 9, 2011
- Recorded: 2007–2011
- Genres: Progressive metal, industrial metal, alternative metal, progressive rock, ambient, new-age
- Length: 6:38:40 (6 CDs + 10”)
- Labels: InsideOut Music, HevyDevy
- Producer: Devin Townsend

Devin Townsend chronology
Ghost (2011)	Contain Us (2011)	By a Thread – Live in London 2011 (2012)

Contain Us is an 8-disc box set released by Canadian musician Devin Townsend on December 9, 2011. It sums all the significant material Townsend has done during 2007–2011 under the Devin Townsend Project moniker. The idea of the box set was introduced by Townsend in 2009 when the first Devin Townsend Project album Ki was revealed.

== Contents ==
The box set includes all four Devin Townsend Project albums (Deconstruction and Ghost are remastered for this release). Bonus disc section includes two CDs and two DVDs consisting of both released and unreleased material. All the discs are housed inside the covers of a 64-page hardcover book. The book itself contains liner notes, promotional material and photography taken during Devin Townsend Project studio and live situations. The book is housed in a charcoal linen hardcover slipcase. The box set is limited to 5,000 copies worldwide, and 500 copies are shipped with a printed drawing signed by Townsend and a limited 10" clear vinyl including two unreleased songs.

== Track listing ==
=== CD 1: Ki ===
All songs written by Townsend except where noted.

No.	Title	Length
1.	"A Monday"	1:43
2.	"Coast"	4:36
3.	"Disruptr"	5:49
4.	"Gato"	5:23
5.	"Terminal" (Devin Townsend, Dave Young)	6:58
6.	"Heaven's End"	8:54
7.	"Ain't Never Gonna Win" (Devin Townsend, Duris Maxwell, Jean Savoie, Dave Young)	3:17
8.	"Winter"	4:48
9.	"Trainfire"	5:59
10.	"Lady Helen"	6:05
11.	"Ki"	7:21
12.	"Quiet Riot"	3:02
13.	"Demon League"	2:55
Total length:		66:50

=== CD 2: Addicted ===
All songs written by Townsend.

No.	Title	Length
1.	"Addicted!"	5:37
2.	"Universe in a Ball!"	4:09
3.	"Bend It Like Bender!"	3:37
4.	"Supercrush!"	5:13
5.	"Hyperdrive!"	3:36
6.	"Resolve!"	3:12
7.	"Ih-Ah!"	3:45
8.	"The Way Home!"	3:14
9.	"Numbered!"	4:55
10.	"Awake!!"	9:44
Total length:		46:49

=== CD 3: Deconstruction ===
All songs written by Townsend.

No.	Title	Length
1.	"Praise the Lowered"	6:02
2.	"Stand"	9:36
3.	"Juular"	3:46
4.	"Planet of the Apes"	10:59
5.	"Sumeria"	6:37
6.	"The Mighty Masturbator"	16:28
7.	"Pandemic"	3:29
8.	"Deconstruction"	9:27
9.	"Poltergeist"	4:25
Total length:		70:49

=== CD 4: Ghost ===
All songs written by Townsend except where noted.

No.	Title	Length
1.	"Fly"	4:15
2.	"Heart Baby"	5:55
3.	"Feather"	11:30
4.	"Kawaii"	2:52
5.	"Ghost"	6:24
6.	"Blackberry"	4:53
7.	"Monsoon" (Devin Townsend, Kat Epple, Dave Young)	4:37
8.	"Dark Matters"	1:57
9.	"Texada"	9:30
10.	"Seams"	4:04
11.	"Infinite Ocean" (Devin Townsend, Dave Young, Mike St-Jean)	8:01
12.	"As You Were"	8:47
Total length:		72:45

=== Bonus CD 1: Stuff That Was Almost Stuff ===
All songs written by Townsend.

No.	Title	Length
1.	"Synchronicity Freaks" (Ki bonus track)	2:09
2.	"Om-2011" (New version of a song originally released on Christeen + 4 Demos in 1998)	4:23
3.	"Catwalk (Fucker Rework)" (New instrumental version of a 2006 Strapping Young Lad song)	3:53
4.	"Juno" (Unreleased leftover track from Addicted)	3:31
5.	"Ho Krll" (Deconstruction bonus track, originally recorded for Ziltoid the Omniscient)	5:50
6.	"Radial Highway" (Ghost bonus track)	6:46
7.	"Watch You" (Ghost bonus track)	8:26
8.	"Traestorz" (Deconstruction demo track, edited version ended up as a part of "The Mighty Masturbator")	19:21
9.	"Sticks and Stones" (Ki bonus track)	6:02
Total length:		60:21

=== Bonus CD 2: Stuff That Was Stuff Before It Was Finished Stuff ===
All songs written by Townsend.

No.	Title	Length
1.	"Coast" (Demo version)	4:09
2.	"Disruptr" (Demo version)	5:50
3.	"Gato Negro" (Demo version of "Gato")	4:55
4.	"Addicted!" (Demo version)	5:43
5.	"Numbered!" (Demo version)	4:38
6.	"Timmy" (Demo version of "Awake!!")	4:42
7.	"Stand" (Demo version)	7:51
8.	"Juular" (Demo version)	3:45
9.	"Brown Man" (Deconstruction demo track)	2:31
10.	"Pandemic" (Demo version)	3:30
11.	"Madd at My Dadd" (Deconstruction demo track)	2:20
12.	"Flies" (Demo version of "Fly")	3:31
13.	"Call Management" (Ki demo track)	4:16
14.	"Freedom" (Demo version of "Kawaii")	3:49
15.	"Two Turntables and a Mike St-Jean" (Kitchen Aid Mix by Dirk Verbeuren)	4:40
Total length:		66:10

=== Bonus DVD 1: Stuff for Your Eyes ===
- Tuska Open Air Metal Festival, 2010 (Five songs)
- NAMM 2011 show (Six songs)
- "Coast" promo video
- "Bend It Like Bender!" promo video
- "Supercrush!" promo video
- "Juular" promo video

=== Bonus DVD 2: Stuff for the Holes in Your Head (Except Your Mouth) ===
Data disc with both audio and video files.

- NAMM 2011 show (Audio file, six songs)
- Audio commentary for all four Devin Townsend Project albums
- Live in the US, 2010 (Audio files, five songs)
- Make Your Own Mixes! ("Juular" and "Bend It Like Bender!" song stems as audio files for remixing)
- Devin Townsend's YouTube videos
- Deep Thoughts videos

=== Bonus vinyl ===
Special 10" clear vinyl limited to 500 hand-numbered copies.

No.	Title	Length
1.	"Dinosaurs"	6:07
2.	"A Ziltoidian Rapture"	8:49
Total length:		14:56
