= Infinity (Devin Townsend album) =

Studio album by Devin Townsend
- Released: October 21, 1998
- Recorded: November 1997 – July 1998
- Studio: Red Stripe Studios, Burnaby, BC, Canada; Premier, Coquitlam, BC, Canada
- Genre: Progressive metal; progressive rock; jazz fusion; experimental rock
- Length: 46:41
- Label: HevyDevy Records; Sony Records (Japanese edition); USG Records and EastWest (German edition); InsideOut (2000 and 2010 re-issue)
- Producer: Devin Townsend

Devin Townsend chronology
Ocean Machine: Biomech (1997)	Infinity (1998)	Physicist (2000)

Devin Townsend overall chronology
No Sleep 'till Bedtime (1998)	Infinity (1998)	Physicist (2000)

Professional ratings
Review scores
Source	Rating
Chronicles of Chaos	6/10

Infinity is the third solo album by Canadian musician Devin Townsend, and the first released under his real name. The album was released in October 1998 on Townsend's label, HevyDevy Records.

== Background ==
After the completion of Strapping Young Lad's extreme metal album City and his solo progressive rock release Ocean Machine: Biomech, Townsend began to approach a mental breakdown. "I started to see human beings as little lonesome, water based, pink meat," he explained, "life forms pushing air through themselves and making noises that the other little pieces of meat seemed to understand." In 1997, he checked himself into a mental-health hospital, where he was diagnosed with bipolar disorder. The diagnosis helped him understand where the two sides of his music were coming from; he felt his disorder "gave birth to the two extremes that are Strapping's City record and Ocean Machine's Biomech."

After being discharged from the hospital, Townsend found that "everything just clicked" and he was able to write his third solo album, Infinity, which he described as "the parent project" of City and Biomech. Townsend returned to the studio, accompanied by drummer Gene Hoglan, to work on the album, on which Townsend played most of the instruments. During the recording sessions, Devin slept on the studio floor. Devin has claimed Infinity was partly inspired by experimentation with LSD and other psychedelic drugs.

A music video was made for the song "Christeen".

== Music ==
The first two minutes of the track "OM" have occasionally been played live as an intro of sorts to other songs, and were demoed for inclusion on Addicted (later appearing on Contain Us). The "Infinite Waltz" section of "Processional" was later used as the outro to "The Mighty Masturbator" from Deconstruction. The track "Truth" was re-recorded for Transcendence, the seventh studio album by the Devin Townsend Project. "OM" was played live in its entirety in 2017 at the Ancient Roman Theater in Plovdiv. The entirety of the album was played in sequence, along with outtakes Om, Sit in the Mountain, and Processional, in a ticketed live stream concert on February 5, 2022 as part of the Quarantine Concert Series.

== Release ==
Infinity was released in October 1998 on Townsend's independent label, HevyDevy Records. It was distributed in Canada by HevyDevy, in Japan by Sony, and in Europe initially by USG Records and later on by InsideOut and with three bonus tracks.

== Track listing ==
The InsideOut release of Infinity had different titles for several tracks; these are listed in parentheses. The InsideOut release of Infinity also contained three bonus tracks.

All tracks are written by Devin Townsend, except "Christeen" by Townsend and Ginger

No.	Title	Length
1.	"Truth"	3:58
2.	"Christeen"	3:41
3.	"Bad Devil"	4:52
4.	"War"	6:29
5.	"Soul Driven" ("Soul Driven Cadillac")	5:14
6.	"Ants"	2:01
7.	"Colonial Boy" ("Wild Colonial Boy")	3:04
8.	"Dynamics" ("Life Is All Dynamics")	5:08
9.	"Unity"	6:07
10.	"Noisy Pink Bubbles"	5:22
Total length:		46:41

Bonus tracks
No.	Title	Length
11.	"Sister" (Live acoustic version)	2:15
12.	"Hide Nowhere" (Live acoustic version)	5:03
13.	"Man" ('96 Demo)	5:12
Total length:		59:11

Remastered 2023 bonus disc
No.	Title	Length
1.	"Om" (Demo)	6:18
2.	"Sit In The Mountain" (Demo)	3:16
3.	"Processional" (Demo): "Star Child Rise"; "Welcome Home"; "Metamorph"; "Infinite Waltz"	11:42
4.	"Love-Load" (Demo)	5:01
5.	"Sister" (Live Acoustic)	2:16
6.	"Hide Nowhere" (Live Acoustic)	5:03
7.	"Man" (‘96 Demo)	5:12
Total length:		38:48

The original track listing intended for Infinity was different from its final release. Due to the record label's time restraints, Townsend could not finish some of the tracks. These were later included on the Christeen + Four Demos EP. The original track list was:

Original track list
No.	Title	Length
1.	"Truth"	3:58
2.	"Processional": "Star Child Rise"; "Welcome Home"; "Metamorph"; "Infinite Waltz"	11:42
3.	"Christeen"	3:41
4.	"War"	6:29
5.	"Soul Driven"	5:14
6.	"Om"	6:18
7.	"Dynamics"	5:08
8.	"Unity"	6:07
Total length:		48:37

== Personnel ==
=== Music ===
- Devin Townsend – vocals, guitar, bass, keyboards, programming
- Gene Hoglan – drums
- Christian Olde Wolbers – upright bass
- Andy Codrington – trombone
- Chris Valagao Mina – guitar, backing vocal
- Erin Townsend, Lyn Townsend, Dave Townsend, Naomi, Tanya Evans, Lara Uthoff, Brad Jackson, Jennifer Lewis – additional vocals
- Jamie Meyer – piano solo (track 3)

=== Production ===
- Devin Townsend – production, recording, engineering, mixing, digital editing, digital assembly
- Mark Gordon – bass engineering
- Matteo Caratozzolo – assistance, digital editing
- Mark Gordon – assistance
- Byron Stroud – assistance
- Marty Schwartz – assistance
- Ross Gale – assistance
- Ramon Donati – assistance
- Scott Ternan – assistance
- Pete Wonsiak – mixing, additional recording
- Matteo Caratozzolo – additional recording
- Jennifer Lewis – digital editing
- Jamie Meyer – digital assembly
- Brett Anthony – digital assembly
- Greg Reely – mastering
- Tracy Turner – management

=== Artwork ===
- Mille Thorsen – layout and design
- Aaron Mason – photography

== Chart performance ==
Chart (1998)	Peak position
Oricon (Japan)	29

Chart (2023)	Peak position
UK Rock & Metal Albums (OCC)	19
