= Ryan Van Poederooyen =

Canadian drummer

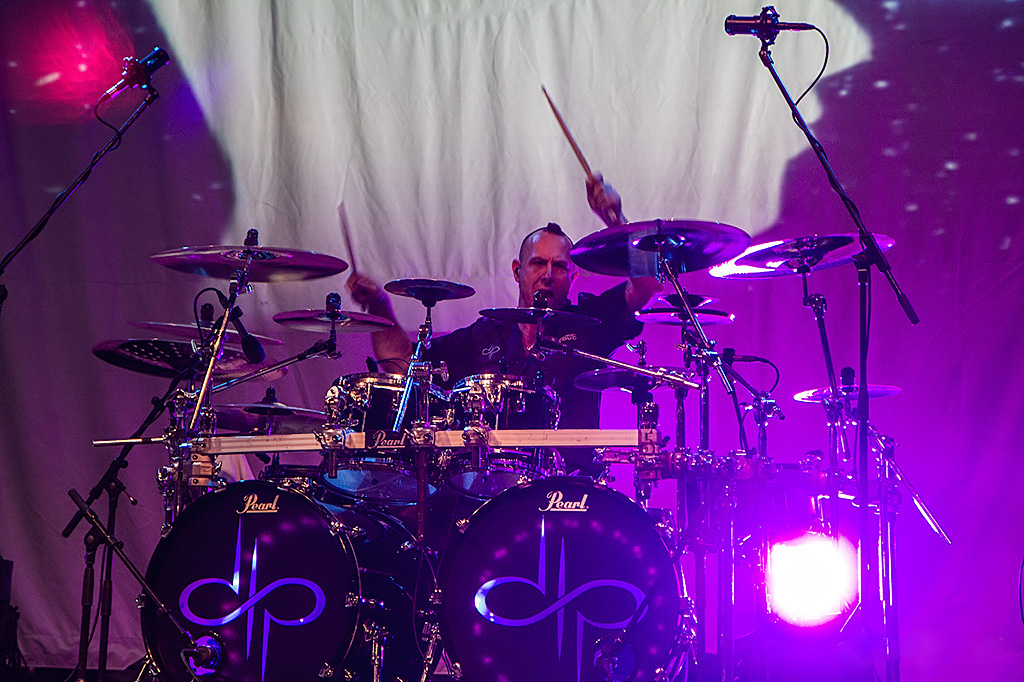
- Van Poederooyen in 2012

Background information
- Also known as: RVP
- Born: Ryan Joost Van Poederooyen; November 13, 1972 (age 53); Port Alberni, British Columbia, Canada
- Origin: Vancouver, British Columbia, Canada
- Genres: Heavy metal, progressive rock
- Occupations: Musician, session musician
- Instrument: Drums
- Years active: 1996–present
- Member of: Ten Ways from Sunday
- Formerly of: God Awakens Petrified; The Devin Townsend Band; The Devin Townsend Project; Non-Human Level; Terror Syndrome

Ryan Joost Van Poederooyen (/væn ˈpuːdərɔɪ.ən/; born November 13, 1972), often referred to by his initials RVP, is a Canadian drummer. He gained international recognition as a member of progressive metal groups The Devin Townsend Band (2002–2007) and The Devin Townsend Project (2009–2018). He is currently a member of progressive rock band Ten Ways from Sunday. as well as the founder of metal bands God Awakens Petrified, Terror Syndrome, and Imonolith.

== Biography ==
Van Poederooyen was born November 13, 1972, in Port Alberni, British Columbia. At the age of 10, his father enrolled him in drum lessons. He played in jazz and stage bands throughout high school, and at age 15 joined a cover band that played throughout Vancouver Island. At 17 he decided to become a full-time musician.

After several years of mixed success doing session work and playing in original bands, Van Poederooyen started his first successful band, experimental metal group God Awakens Petrified, in 1996. The band opened for thrash metal pioneers Megadeth in 2000 and released a self-titled album and an EP before disbanding in 2004.

In 2002, Van Poederooyen was contacted by Devin Townsend to join a progressive metal group he was forming to play his solo material. Van Poederooyen was recommended by long-time Townsend drummer Gene Hoglan, who had seen him perform with God Awakens Petrified. The Devin Townsend Band released two albums, Accelerated Evolution and Synchestra, before disbanding in 2007. Van Poederooyen was also approached by Darkane guitarist Christofer Malmström to play in his solo project, Non-Human Level, which released a self-titled album in 2005.

Van Poederooyen began work on a new solo project in 2004 with Devin Townsend Band members Mike Young and Dave Young. The band, Terror Syndrome, independently issued a digital release of its self-titled debut album in 2008, shortly after acquiring Annihilator vocalist Dave Padden. Van Poederooyen also joined Ten Ways from Sunday, a progressive rock band formed by Mike Young and Dave Young, in May 2008.

Van Poederooyen continued working with Devin Townsend, featuring on the Devin Townsend Project albums Addicted, Deconstruction (sharing drumming duties with Dirk Verbeuren), Epicloud, the double album Z² (Sky Blue & Dark Matters) and Transcendence. The live album, Ocean Machine - Live at the Ancient Roman Theatre Plovdiv, was their final release.

== Equipment ==
Van Poederooyen previously used Pearl Reference Series drums in Arctic White, but has since switched to the Sonor Prolite Series. He uses Regal Tip RVP Signature drumsticks.

== Selected discography ==
=== God Awakens Petrified ===
- God Awakens Petrified (1999)
- After Birth (EP, 2002)

=== The Devin Townsend Band ===
- Accelerated Evolution (2003)
- Synchestra (2006)

=== Terror Syndrome ===
- Terror Syndrome (2008)

=== Devin Townsend Project ===
- Addicted (2009)
- Deconstruction (2011)
- Epicloud (2012)
- Z²: Sky Blue & Dark Matters (2014)
- Transcendence (2016)

=== Collaborative ===
- Oniric Metal (Lalu, 2005)
- Non-Human Level (Non-Human Level, 2005)
- Seven Second Surgery (Faber Drive, 2007)
- Breaking Ground (Delight, 2007)
- TheMightyOne (TheMightyOne, 2008)
