= Ocean Machine: Biomech =

Studio album by Devin Townsend
- Released: July 21, 1997
- Recorded: September – December 1996
- Studio: The Factory (Vancouver); Slack (Vancouver); Shithole Headquarters (Burnaby); Musibelios (Málaga)
- Genre: Progressive metal; post-metal; hard rock; alternative metal; art rock
- Length: 73:52
- Label: HevyDevy
- Producer: Devin Townsend

Devin Townsend chronology
Punky Brüster – Cooked on Phonics (1996)	Ocean Machine: Biomech (1997)	Infinity (1998)

Devin Townsend overall chronology
City (1997)	Ocean Machine: Biomech (1997)	No Sleep 'till Bedtime (1998)

Professional ratings
Review scores
Source	Rating
AllMusic	3/5 stars

Ocean Machine: Biomech is the second studio album by Canadian musician Devin Townsend, originally released as Biomech under the name Ocean Machine. The album was released in July 1997 via Townsend's label, HevyDevy Records.

== Background ==
Material for Ocean Machine: Biomech had been around since the time Devin Townsend was touring with Steve Vai in support of Sex & Religion, with some tracks, such as "Funeral", "Regulator" and "The Death of Music", stretching back to Townsend's days with Noisescapes. The album's basic tracks of guitar, bass and drums were recorded in The Factory Studios in Vancouver during the same time Rob Halford recorded there the Voyeurs album of his band Two. Due to Townsend's discontent with the sound, in September 1996, he took the recorded material with producer Daniel Bergstrand to Málaga, Spain, to re-record the guitars, drums, and re-amp the bass. Torrential rains were storming the seacoast of Spain at that time, which prevented them from taking any decent recording of the drums. As a result, the sample for the snare drum on the album is actually taken straight from the beginning of "Sad but True" by Metallica. Due to Townsend's constant dispute with the studio owner, who kept kicking him out of the studio every afternoon to party with his friends, one of them being then rising movie star Antonio Banderas, Townsend then refused to pay the studio bill, which resulted in him being denied access to the master tape by the studio owner. Frustrated by that, Townsend eventually decided to sneak in the studio with Bergstrand at 3 A.M. to make a copy of the master tape, accidentally leaving out the song Ocean Machines there, thus the song exists only in demo quality.

== Music ==
Ocean Machine: Biomech featured a mix of hard rock, ambient, and progressive metal. The album was the follow-up to the critically acclaimed City by Townsend's extreme metal band Strapping Young Lad. Townsend viewed Strapping Young Lad as a "little project" that he considered a "parody" and not the intended focus of his music, but lamented that Ocean Machine, which he described as "the music that was really close to me," was largely dismissed upon its release.

The album opens with a reciting of a poem from 19th century English poet Alfred, Lord Tennyson.

Track 7, "Voices in the Fan," ends with an excerpt of the madrigal "Giovane donna il suo bel volto in specchio" from the 16th-century cycle Lagrime di San Pietro by Orlande de Lassus.

Many of the songs on Ocean Machine: Biomech have become live staples during Townsend's career; however, "The Death of Music" did not make its live debut until April 2015.

The album is specifically referenced in the demo "Ocean Machines" from Ass-Sordid Demos and "Resolve" from Addicted. "Sister" is sampled in the ambience ending "Traveller" on Accelerated Evolution. "Voices in the Fan" is recalled in "Colour Your World" on Ziltoid the Omniscient. A riff in "Regulator" forms the basis of "Om" from the Infinity/Christeen + 4 Demos EP. "Bastard" is referenced in "Rain City" on Sky Blue. "The Death of Music" reuses the chorus of bonus track "Japan" from the first SYL album Heavy as a Really Heavy Thing (also released as a bonus on No Sleep 'till Bedtime).

== Release ==
Ocean Machine: Biomech was released in July 1997. When Townsend was unable to get the album picked up by a record label, he founded his own independent record label, HevyDevy Records, to release his solo material. On its original Japanese release, the album was entitled Biomech and "Ocean Machine" was listed as the artist name; the album was later reissued worldwide with a compound title under Townsend's name. The album was distributed in Canada by HevyDevy, in Europe and America by Inside Out Music, and in Japan by Sony.

The album sold 12,000 copies in Japan in its first week of release. Although musically straying from Townsend's extreme metal work in Strapping Young Lad, Ocean Machine: Biomech was met with favorable reviews. Metal Hammer praised it as a "concept album akin to the sensuality and escapism of Pink Floyd, [as] Devin lyrically and musically explores real and not particularly uplifting topics such as death, isolation, and depression." Noise Level Critical wrote that "anyone who heard the [Steve] Vai album Sex & Religion will know that Townsend's voice is top-notch, with the ability to go from aggressive bark, to high-pitched wail, to soft emotional whisper in the space of one song."

On March 17, 2017, a complete live playthrough was made at Hammersmith Apollo, followed on September 22, 2017, by a live performance in the Ancient Roman Theatre in Plovdiv, Bulgaria, recorded and featured on the band's third live album, released on July 6, 2018, via Inside Out Music.

== Track listing ==
All tracks are written by Devin Townsend.

No.	Title	Length
1.	"Seventh Wave"	6:50
2.	"Life"	4:31
3.	"Night"	4:45
4.	"Hide Nowhere"	5:00
5.	"Sister"	2:48
6.	"3 A.M."	1:56
7.	"Voices in the Fan"	4:39
8.	"Greetings"	2:53
9.	"Regulator"	5:06
10.	"Funeral"	8:06
11.	"Bastard": "Not One of My Better Days"; "The Girl from Blue City"	10:17
12.	"The Death of Music"	12:15
13.	"Thing Beyond Things"	4:47
Total length:		73:53

== Personnel ==
- Devin Townsend – vocals, guitar, keyboards, production, mixing, editing
- JR Harder – bass
- Marty Chapman – drums
- Chris Valagao Mina– guitar, backing vocals
- John Morgan – keyboards, samples, engineering
- Matteo Caratozzolo – editing
- Tim Oberthier – engineering
- Sheldon Zaharko – engineering
- Daniel Bergstrand – recording, mixing
- Victor Morden – mixing assistance
- Masa Noda – photography
- Daniel Collins – artwork
