= Ziltoid the Omniscient =

Studio album by Devin Townsend
- Released: May 21, 2007
- Recorded: November 6, 2006 – March 1, 2007
- Studio: Townsend's home studio, the "Devlab" (Pitt Meadows, BC)
- Genre: Progressive metal; avant-garde metal
- Length: 53:46
- Label: HevyDevy
- Producer: Devin Townsend

Devin Townsend chronology
| The Hummer (2006) | Ziltoid the Omniscient (2007) | Ki (2009) |

Devin Townsend overall chronology
| The Hummer (2006) | Ziltoid the Omniscient (2007) | 1994–2006 Chaos Years (2008) |

Professional ratings
Review scores
| Source | Rating |
|---|---|
| About.com | 4.5/5 stars |
| AllMusic | 4/5 stars |
| Blabbermouth | 9/10 |
| Metal Injection | 7/10 |

Ziltoid the Omniscient is the tenth studio album by Canadian metal musician Devin Townsend, released on his own label HevyDevy Records in May 2007, and distributed in America and Europe by InsideOut Music.

The album is a concept album about an extraterrestrial being named Ziltoid from the planet Ziltoidia 9. Ziltoid travels to Earth in search of "your universe's ultimate cup of coffee". When a cup of coffee is delivered to him, he is appalled by its taste, declaring it "fetid", and summons the Ziltoidian warlords to attack Earth, facing the full might of Earth's army. Townsend describes the album as a mix between Strapping Young Lad and The Devin Townsend Band, with a storyline like that of Punky Brüster's Cooked on Phonics.

The album is a solo album, with all music written, mixed, produced and performed by Townsend. All drum tracks were produced with EZdrummer, a software drum machine, using the Drumkit from Hell expansion.

Townsend played a world exclusive ZTO concert in Tuska Open Air Metal Festival in Helsinki on July 2, 2010, where the whole Ziltoid album was played, with a regular Devin Townsend Project set the next day. Townsend published a series of online videos involving Ziltoid in a series titled ZTV.

In 2014, Townsend announced the recording of Z², a sequel to the original rock opera. The recording of Z² started in May 2014, and the album was released on October 27, 2014.

== Background ==
Townsend's wife, Tracy Turner, gave birth to their first son, Reyner Liam Johnstan Townsend, on October 4, 2006. Around this time, Townsend withdrew from touring with his extreme metal band Strapping Young Lad and his progressive metal group The Devin Townsend Band, explaining that he was burnt out on touring and interviewing. Townsend released an ambient album, The Hummer, around this time.

Townsend then began work on his next solo album, Ziltoid the Omniscient. "And I really mean solo, in the true sense of the word", explained Townsend. "Nobody was around. For four months I worked completely on my own. I recorded each instrumental track and I also programmed all the drums. ... I was sound engineer and producer and I mixed every note in my cellar with a minimum of gear. I wanted to prove to myself that I could do it all on my own." Townsend programmed the drums using Drumkit from Hell, a software drum machine provided to him by Fredrik Thordendal of Meshuggah.

"Color Your World" uses a rhythmic pattern spelling "om" from "Info Dump" on SYL's Alien. It also references "Voices in the Fan" from Ocean Machine. "Hyperdrive" was later re-recorded for Addicted.

== Release ==
Ziltoid the Omniscient was released May 21, 2007, on Townsend's independent label HevyDevy Records. It was distributed in Canada by HevyDevy, in Japan by Sony, and in Europe by InsideOut. A special two-disc edition was also released with three bonus tracks and various multimedia features.

== Track listing ==
All tracks are written by Devin Townsend.

| No. | Title | Length |
|---|---|---|
| 1. | "ZTO" | 1:17 |
| 2. | "By Your Command" | 8:09 |
| 3. | "Ziltoidia Attaxx!!!" | 3:42 |
| 4. | "Solar Winds" | 9:46 |
| 5. | "Hyperdrive" | 3:47 |
| 6. | "N9" | 5:30 |
| 7. | "Planet Smasher" | 5:45 |
| 8. | "Omnidimensional Creator" | 0:48 |
| 9. | "Color Your World" | 9:44 |
| 10. | "The Greys" | 4:15 |
| 11. | "Tall Latte" | 1:03 |
| Total length: | | 53:46 |

Special edition bonus disc
| No. | Title | Length |
|---|---|---|
| 1. | "Don't Know Why" (aka Messages from Ziltoid) | 7:34 |
| 2. | "Travelling Salesman" | 2:14 |
| 3. | "Another Road" | 4:29 |
| Total length: | | 14:17 |

The bonus video material contains a "guitar instructional", in which Townsend plays extracts from the songs "Wrong Side" by Strapping Young Lad and "Truth", and talks about the equipment he uses for recording and live performances. Five webisode skits performed with the Ziltoid puppet, originally broadcast on MySpace, are also included.

== Personnel ==
- Devin Townsend – vocals, guitar, bass, keyboards, programming, production, mixing, engineering
- U. E. Nastasi – mastering
- Fredrik Thordendal – drum support
- Dave Young – additional engineering, additional voices
- Mike Young – additional engineering
- Brian Waddell – additional voices
- Marcus Rogers – Video producer / Director. puppet production
- Rae Reedyk – puppet production
- Travis Smith – artwork
