= Terria (Devin Townsend album) =

Studio album by Devin Townsend
- Released: August 27, 2001
- Recorded: February 12–May 2001
- Studio: Mushroom, Manland, Bedlam, Platinum Plus and Greenhouse Studios, Vancouver, BC
- Genre: Progressive metal; progressive rock; art rock; post-metal
- Length: 71:54
- Label: HevyDevy Records
- Producer: Devin Townsend

Devin Townsend chronology
Physicist (2000)	Terria (2001)	Strapping Young Lad (2003)

Devin Townsend solo/band chronology
Physicist (2000)	Terria (2001)	Accelerated Evolution (2003)

Terria is the fifth solo album by Canadian musician Devin Townsend. The album was released in 2001 on Townsend's label, HevyDevy Records.

== Background ==
Feeling he had "attracted a bunch of poo" with his previous album Physicist (2000), Townsend felt he had the chance to make a more personal and honest record. Townsend was inspired one morning while driving across Canada with his band, and looked to write an "introspective" album dedicated to his homeland. He produced and recorded Terria, a "highly illustrated stream-of-consciousness" album, with Gene Hoglan on drums, Craig McFarland on bass and Jamie Meyer on keyboards. The artwork of the album was handled by Travis Smith, who once called it his favorite work along with Katatonia's Last Fair Deal Gone Down. The song "Tiny Tears" derived its title from a Godflesh song with the same name off of their 1989 debut studio album Streetcleaner.

== Music ==
Terria has been described as "melodic and atmospheric", with elements of pop and ambience alongside Townsend's trademark heaviness. Terria features musical themes explored in Townsend's previous albums, such as Ocean Machine: Biomech. However, it is more restrained, "using silence as part of the music". Townsend cited Ween's White Pepper as an inspiration for the album.

"Canada" uses a slowed-down sample of a child speaking, earlier used on "S.Y.L." from Heavy as a Really Heavy Thing.

== Release ==
Terria was released in August 2001 on Townsend's independent label, HevyDevy Records. It is distributed in Canada by HevyDevy, in Japan by Sony, and in Europe and North America by InsideOut. A limited-edition two-disc version was also released, which included the bonus song "Universal", as well as a multimedia element containing footage of a Devin Townsend concert in Japan and audio commentary about the album.

== Critical reception ==
Professional ratings
Review scores
Source	Rating
BraveWords	8/10
Chronicles of Chaos	8/10
Sputnikmusic	4/5 stars

Sputnikmusic gave the album four stars, describing Terria as "not a perfect album, but an immense and, if you let it be, absorbing one."

== Track listing ==
All tracks are written by Devin Townsend.

No.	Title	Length
1.	"Olives"	3:21
2.	"Mountain"	6:32
3.	"Earth Day"	9:35
4.	"Deep Peace"	7:34
5.	"Canada"	6:53
6.	"Down and Under"	3:43
7.	"The Fluke"	7:16
8.	"Nobody's Here"	6:54
9.	"Tiny Tears"	9:12
10.	"Stagnant"	5:25
11.	"Humble" (hidden track)	5:30
Total length:		71:54

Limited Edition bonus track
No.	Title	Length
12.	"Universal"	5:55
Total length:		77:09

South Korean bonus disk
No.	Title	Length
1.	"Universal"	5:57
2.	"Sit in the Mountain"	3:17
3.	"Man"	5:12
Total length:		14:27

== Personnel ==
- Devin Townsend – guitar, vocals, ambience, samples, keyboards
- Gene Hoglan – drums
- Craig McFarland – fretless bass
- Jamie Meyer – piano, keyboards
- Chris Valagao Mina – guitar, backing vocal

=== Production ===
- Devin Townsend – production, engineering, mixing
- Shaun Thingvold – engineering, mixing
- Scott Ternan – engineering
- Jamie Meyer – engineering
- Lee Preston – engineering
- Chris Crippen – drum teching
- Mike Bellis – drum teching
- Travis Smith – illustration, design, layout
- Gloria Fraser – photography
- Tracy Turner – management

== Chart performance ==
Chart	Peak position
SNEP (France)	125
Oricon (Japan)	81
