= Blistering (magazine) =

Online music magazine

- Website type: Online music magazine
- Available in: English
- Owner: Blistering Media Inc
- Website: blistering.com
- Registration: No
- Launched: 1998
- Current status: Defunct (2013)

Blistering, founded in 1998, was an international online magazine dedicated to heavy metal and hard rock music. Its editor-in-chief was David E. Gehlke, an American music journalist who has written for About.com, Metal Maniacs, and Throat Culture. Blistering was cited as a source on heavy metal by the Chicago Sun-Times, Charleston's The Post and Courier, The Washington Times, Blabbermouth.net, The Current, and Pegasus News. The magazine went defunct in January 2013.
