= Accelerated Evolution =

Studio album by The Devin Townsend Band
- Released: March 31, 2003
- Genres: Alternative rock, arena rock, pop metal
- Length: 54:30
- Label: HevyDevy
- Producer: Devin Townsend

The Devin Townsend Band chronology
Accelerated Evolution (2003)	Synchestra (2006)

Devin Townsend chronology
Strapping Young Lad (2003)	Accelerated Evolution (2003)	Devlab (2004)

Accelerated Evolution is the sixth studio album by Canadian musician Devin Townsend and the first recorded with his backing group, the Devin Townsend Band. It was released on March 31, 2003, by Townsend's independent label, HevyDevy Records. Written and produced by Townsend, the album is an alternative rock album. Townsend, the lead vocalist and guitarist, assembled a group of musicians to perform with him on the album: guitarist Brian Waddell, drummer Ryan Van Poederooyen, bassist Mike Young, and keyboardist Dave Young. This lineup was named the Devin Townsend Band, created as a counterpart to Townsend's extreme metal project Strapping Young Lad.

Accelerated Evolution was written and recorded at the same time as Strapping Young Lad's self-titled album, with Townsend dividing his time between the two. After its release, Townsend toured North America to promote the album, sometimes playing in a joint billing with Strapping Young Lad. The album was well received by critics for its blend of genres, accessibility, and large-scale rock production style. The album appeared in the French and Japanese sales charts for one week.

== Background ==
During the creation of his early solo albums Infinity (1998) and Physicist (2000), Devin Townsend's writing ability was affected by personal struggles. These were resolved during the creation of Townsend's fifth studio album Terria (2001) which caused Townsend to feel a newfound enthusiasm for his music.

Townsend formed a new, permanent band called the Devin Townsend Band to record and tour his solo releases. Townsend chose members of local bands who had different life and career experiences from his own to provide fresh perspectives on his music. The band consisted of Brian Waddell on guitar, Ryan Van Poederooyen on drums, and brothers Mike Young and Dave Young on bass and keyboards, respectively; Townsend performed guitar and vocals, while also producing the album.

He wrote and produced Accelerated Evolution while also working on Strapping Young Lad's self-titled album (2003), spending half the week on one and half on the other. The album was named Accelerated Evolution in reference to the frantic pace of putting a new band together in under a year.

== Music ==
Accelerated Evolution was intended to be a musical contrast to Strapping Young Lad (abbreviated to SYL). The music genre is alternative rock, and more specifically, "a blend of '70s/'80s arena rock/pop-metal and '90s/2000s alt rock". It is more melodic and rock-based than SYL or Physicist, featuring more of Townsend's singing than his other albums released at that time. It also places greater emphasis on individual songs than Terria.

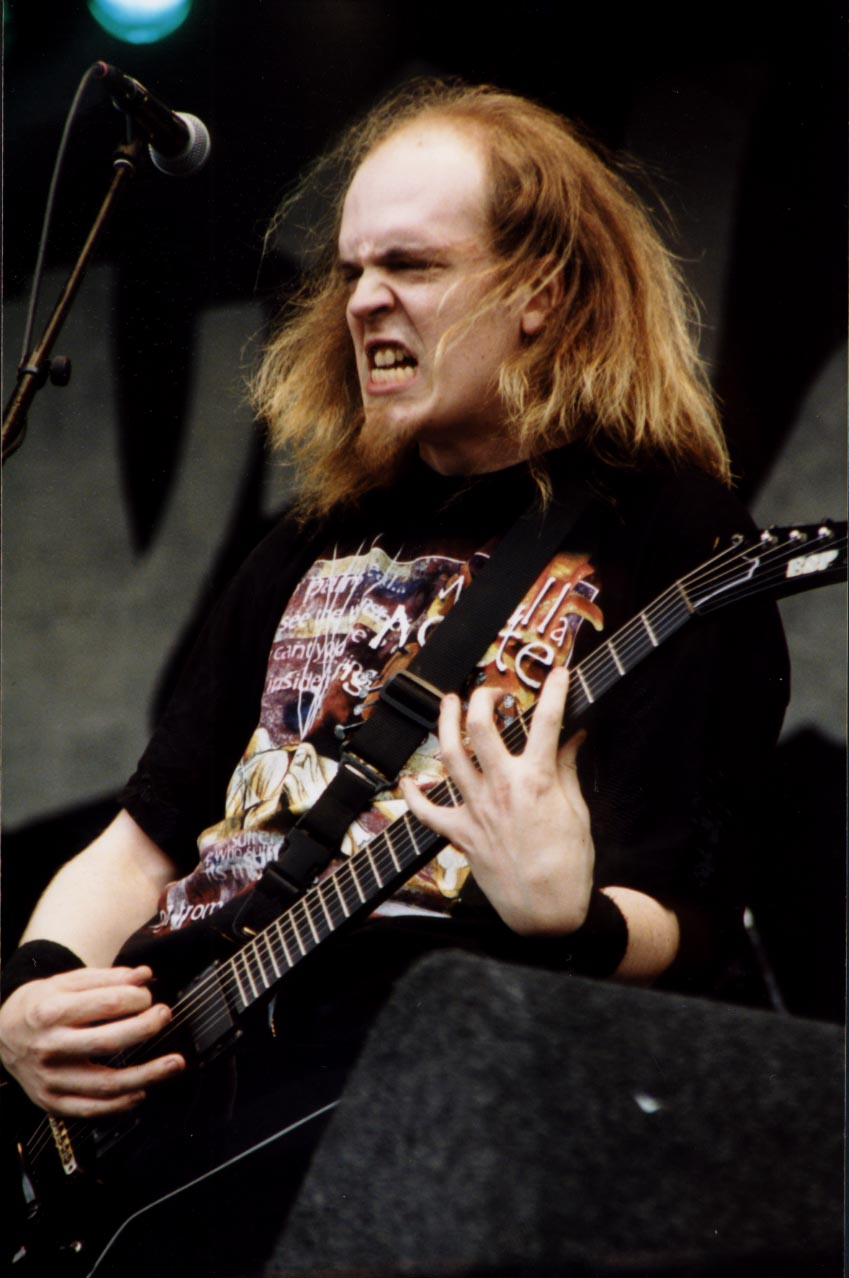
Townsend in 2001

Songs such as "Storm", "Suicide", and "Sunday Afternoon" were described as "less frantic and more mature" than songs on Infinity. "Deadhead" derived its name from an extreme industrial metal track with the same title from Godflesh's 1989 album Streetcleaner. Townsend aimed for the album to be commercially viable, making his existing style more concise and accessible while avoiding pop characteristics. He produced and mixed the album in a wall of sound style that blended layers of guitars, keyboards, and vocals.

== Release ==
Accelerated Evolution was released on March 31, 2003, on Townsend's independent label, HevyDevy Records, on compact disc. It was distributed by HevyDevy and Inside Out in various regions, with Sony distributing the album in Japan. The album art was created by Travis Smith. InsideOut also released a special edition of the album which contained a three-track EP called Project EKO, Townsend's first foray into electronica. Accelerated Evolution reached numbers 135 and 249 in France and Japan respectively, remaining on their charts for one week.

Following the release of Accelerated Evolution, Townsend toured with the Devin Townsend Band, sometimes separately from Strapping Young Lad and at other times performing together. After two release shows in Vancouver in July 2003, the Devin Townsend Band toured Canada with Strapping Young Lad and Zimmers Hole in October 2003. This was followed by a North American tour with progressive metal band Symphony X in November and December 2003.

== Critical reception ==
Professional ratings
Review scores
Source	Rating
AllMusic	4/5 stars
Blabbermouth.net	8/10
Chronicles of Chaos	8.5/10
KNAC.com	5/5 stars

Accelerated Evolution was well received by critics. They stated that the album blended different genres of music, making it accessible to a wider audience. Chris Hawkins, in his album review for KNAC.com, wrote that "what Devin manages to do is take the most infectious rhythm, place his stamp upon it, and thus create something completely original." The review on Blabbermouth.net stated that the album occasionally had a "lapse in focus" and highlighted the last track on the album as "throwaway fluff" that did not showcase Townsend's talents, but overall the album was a positive experience.

Writing for Treble Magazine, Thomas Hatton said that the album's Wall of Sound style would take time to be appreciated by new listeners, while Eric Chon in Lollipop Magazine stated that listeners would need to replay the tracks to distinguish the overlapping melodies. Xander Hoose in Chronicles of Chaos, when comparing this album to SYL, said that Accelerated Evolution's songs had more variation and were more layered, multi-dimensional, and memorable.

== Track listing ==
All tracks are written by Devin Townsend.

No.	Title	Length
1.	"Depth Charge"	6:04
2.	"Storm"	4:39
3.	"Random Analysis"	5:59
4.	"Deadhead"	8:05
5.	"Suicide"	6:45
6.	"Traveller"	4:13
7.	"Away"	7:49
8.	"Sunday Afternoon"	6:20
9.	"Slow Me Down"	4:35
Total length:		54:30

Inside Out Music's special edition of Accelerated Evolution included Project EKO.

Project EKO
No.	Title	Length
1.	"Locate"	6:59
2.	"Echo"	5:29
3.	"Assignable"	5:20
Total length:		17:08

== Personnel ==
Credits are adapted from Accelerated Evolution album liner notes.

- Devin Townsend – guitar, vocals, ambience
- Ryan Van Poederooyen – drums
- Mike Young – bass
- Brian Waddell – guitar
- Dave Young – keyboards

=== Production ===
- Devin Townsend – production, audio engineering, mixing
- Shaun Thingvold – engineering, mixing
- Goran Finnberg – mastering
- Misha Rajaratnam, Dan Kearley, Carla Levis, Scott Cooke, Jay Van Poederooyen, Lori Bridger, Chris Guy – assistance

=== Artwork ===
- Omer Cordell – photography (credited as Omer Shaked)
- Travis Smith – graphics, layout

== Charts ==
Weekly chart performance
Chart (2003)	Peak position
French Albums (SNEP)	135
Japanese Albums (Oricon)	249
