= Dave Young (musician, born 1982) =

Canadian musician

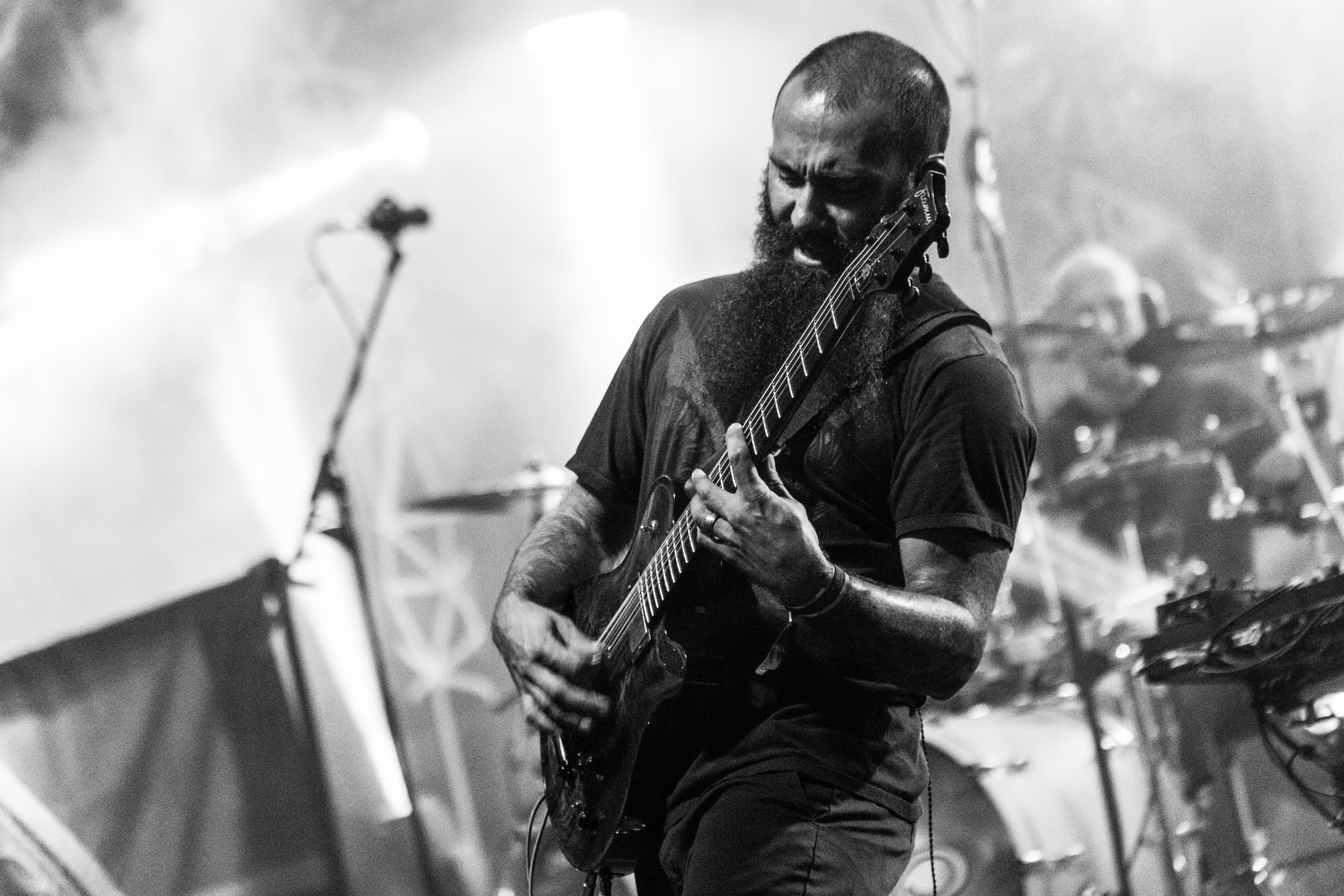
- Young with the Devin Townsend Project in 2017

Background information
- Born: January 13, 1982 (age 44)
- Origin: Coquitlam, British Columbia, Canada
- Genres: Heavy metal, progressive rock, alternative rock
- Occupation: Musician
- Instruments: Guitar, keyboards, vocals, mandolin, melodica
- Member of: Ten Ways from Sunday
- Formerly of: Strapping Young Lad; Terror Syndrome; The Matinée; The Devin Townsend Band

Dave Young (born January 13, 1982) is a Canadian multi-instrumentalist. He has been a member of several notable groups, including The Devin Townsend Band, Ten Ways from Sunday, Terror Syndrome, and The Matinée. He has also played on the album Alien by Strapping Young Lad. He plays guitar, keyboards, and several wind instruments. He played guitar in the live lineup of the Devin Townsend Project, alongside former bandmates Brian "Beav" Waddell and Ryan Van Poederooyen.

In 2016, Young and his brother Mike, also an accomplished session musician, founded a music production company called Young Brothers Productions.
