= Unit:187 =

Canadian industrial band

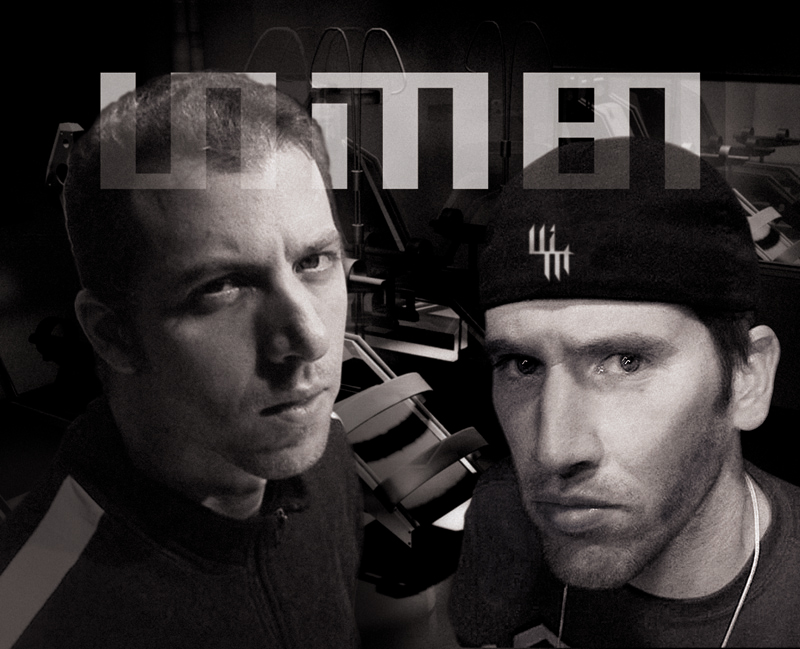

Background information
- Origin: Vancouver, British Columbia, Canada
- Genres: Electro-industrial; Industrial metal
- Years active: 1994–2015, 2024–present
- Labels: Metropolis; Vendetta Music; COP International
- Members: John Morgan; Chris Peterson; Ross Redhead; Kerry Vink-Peterson
- Past members: Ashley Scribner; Byron Stroud; Robert Wagner; Jed Simon; Jason Hagan; Tod Law; Galen Waling
- Website: unit187.com

Unit:187 is a Canadian industrial band, formed in 1994 by vocalist Tod Law, keyboardist John Morgan, and guitarist Ashley Scribner. The band had initially signed to the 21st Circuitry label. During the recording of the band's debut album, bassist Byron Stroud joined the lineup. Unit:187 was released in early 1996. For their second album in 1997, Loaded, Jed Simon had replaced Scribner on guitars. After various conflicts between 21st Circuitry and Unit:187, the band parted ways with the label; Stroud and Simon left the band soon after as well. Unit:187 released their third album, Capital Punishment, in 2003 through COP International. The album featured contributions from keyboardist Chris Peterson and guitarist Ross Redhead, both of whom joined the band afterwards.

Unit:187 reconvened in 2010 to release their fourth album, Out for Blood. The band entered a hiatus in 2015 when Law died as a result of leukemia. Unit:187 reformed in 2024 with Morgan, Peterson, and Redhead joined by vocalist Kerry Vink. Their fifth album was released that year, titled KillCure. The album featured posthumous contributions from Law.

== History ==
Unit:187 (also known as Unit 187) was formed in Vancouver, British Columbia. Keyboardist John Morgan and vocalist Tod Law formed the band together, and shortly after, Ashley Scribner joined on guitar. Vancouver industrial bands such as Front Line Assembly and Skinny Puppy were early influences for the band's first self-titled studio album, which was released by 21st Circuitry in early 1996. The three members combined their musical interests at the time (Law with punk rock, Scribner with death metal, and Morgan with techno). During the first album's recording process, Byron Stroud recorded bass on a few songs, and eventually joined the band on a full-time basis. Robert Wagner (Stroud's former bandmate in Caustic Thought) was also added to the band as their live drummer.

In 1997, the band's second album Loaded was released by 21st Circuitry. Loaded gained wider exposure than Unit:187, and it featured a remix by Rhys Fulber and production by Devin Townsend. At that point, Jed Simon had replaced Scribner on guitar and Jason Hagan had replaced Wagner on drums. Simon, Stroud, Morgan, and former member Scribner had all played in Townsend's band Strapping Young Lad at various points.

In 1999, 21st Circuitry Records collapsed, and left the band to find a new home for their music. In 2003, Unit:187 released Capital Punishment on their new label, COP International. Mixing was handled by both Ken "Hiwatt" Marshall and Anthony Valcic. Stroud, Simon, and Hagan were no longer in the band by then, as Unit:187 consisted of only Law and Morgan. Chris Peterson, known for his work with Front Line Assembly, had produced a few songs on Capital Punishment, and he also joined the band afterwards. Guitarist Ross Redhead also joined Unit:187 at the same time, as he contributed to a remix on Capital Punishment whilst a member of Peterson's side project Decree.

Unit:187's fourth studio album, Out for Blood, was released at the end of October 2010. For the subsequent live shows, drummer Galen Waling joined the band. In 2012, Unit:187 and Vendetta Music released the Out for Blood remix album Transfusion, which featured remixes from bands including Stiff Valentine, 16Volt, Mindless Faith, and iVardensphere. On June 22, 2015, Unit:187 announced on its Facebook page that Law had died as a result of leukemia. One year later, former drummer Hagan died at the age of 44 due to heart failure.

Unit:187's fifth studio album KillCure was released on December 6, 2024 by Metropolis Records. It featured contributions from Law prior to his death, in addition to Kerry Vink joining the band on vocals. In 2025, Unit:187 returned to a live setting. The lineup consisted of Morgan, Peterson, Redhead, and Vink.

== Members ==
Current

- John Morgan – keyboards, programming (1994–2015, 2024–present)
- Chris Peterson – keyboards, programming (2003–2015, 2024–present)
- Ross Redhead – guitars (2003–2015, 2024–present)
- Kerry Vink – vocals (2024–present)

Former

- Tod Law – vocals, guitars, bass (1994–2015); died 2015
- Ashley Scribner – guitars, programming (1994–1996)
- Byron Stroud – bass (1996–1999)
- Robert Wagner – drums (1996–1997)
- Jed Simon – guitars (1996–1999)
- Jason Hagan – drums (1997–1999); died 2016
- Galen Waling – drums (2010–2015)

=== Timeline ===
Color denotes main live duty.

== Discography ==
Studio albums

- Unit:187 (1996)
- Loaded (1997)
- Capital Punishment (2003)
- Out for Blood (2010)
- KillCure (2024)

Remix albums

- Transfusion (2012)

EPs

- Stillborn (1997)
