= Loaded (Unit:187 album) =

Studio album by Unit:187
- Released: August 26, 1997
- Recorded: February 1997
- Studio: Various: Precinct 13; (Vancouver, BC); Slack Studios; (Vancouver, BC)
- Genre: Industrial metal
- Length: 64:48
- Label: 21st Circuitry
- Producer: Tod Law; John Morgan; Tim Oberthier; Jed Simon; Byron Stroud; Devin Townsend

Unit:187 chronology
Unit:187 (1996)	Loaded (1997)	Stillborn (1997)

Loaded is the second studio album by Unit:187, released on August 26, 1997 by 21st Circuitry. Writing for the album was completed in December 1996 but the material wasn't recorded until February of the following year. In October 1997 CMJ New Music Monthly listed the album at number one on their "Dance Top 25" chart.

== Reception ==
Professional ratings
Review scores
Source	Rating
Allmusic	3/5 stars

Allmusic awarded Loaded three out of five possible stars. Aiding & Abetting commended the band for diversifying their sound, saying "change is good, and I think the pullback from the hardcore is the right one" and "there are still plenty of mean and loud moments, but now they have a context in which to work." Sonic Boom credited the band's change in membership and choice of Strapping Young Lad frontman Devin Townsend as a producer with providing "rich compositional arrangement, appropriate use of guitars, and strong production qualities that make UNIT:187 sound like a brand new band." Fabryka Music Magazine called Loaded "a successful trial of connecting metal riffs with modern electronics."

== Track listing ==
All tracks are written by Tod Law, John Morgan, Jed Simon and Byron Stroud, except "Planet Claire" by Henry Mancini, Kate Pierson, Fred Schneider, Keith Strickland, Cindy Wilson and Ricky Wilson.

No.	Title	Remixer(s)	Length
1.	"Loaded"		6:36
2.	"Dick"		5:20
3.	"Dead Dogs"		5:05
4.	"Nobody"		4:55
5.	"Traces"		6:03
6.	"Shape Shifter"		4:47
7.	"Rat Trap"		4:52
8.	"Planet Claire" (The B-52's cover)		3:04
9.	"Stillborn"		6:17
10.	"Dead Dogs" (Doggy Style Mix)	Tensor	6:30
11.	"Loaded" (Shockfuckee Mix)	16volt	4:36
12.	"Stillborn" (Second Coming Mix)	Rhys Fulber	6:43

== Accolades ==
Year	Publication	Country	Accolade	Rank
1997	CMJ New Music Monthly	United States	"Dance Top 25"	1
"*" denotes an unordered list.

== Personnel ==
Adapted from the Loaded liner notes.

Unit:187

- Tod Law – lead vocals, production and engineering (5, 6)
- John Morgan (as Gorgon) – programming, production (1–4, 7–12), and engineering (5, 6)
- Jed Simon – guitar, production and engineering (5, 6)
- Byron Stroud – bass guitar, production and engineering (5, 6)

Additional personnel

- Stephen Caccilin (as Tensor) – remixing and engineering (10)
- Rhys Fulber – remixing and engineering (12)
- Sid Meconse (as Tensor) – remixing and engineering (10)
- Eric Powell – remixing and engineering (11)

Production and design

- John Fyssas – mastering, editing
- Tim Oberthier – engineering, production (6)
- Nickie Senger – design
- Chris Sheldon – photography
- Devin Townsend – engineering, production (1–4, 7–12)

== Release history ==
Region	Date	Label	Format	Catalog
United States	1997	21st Circuitry	CD	21C.CD25
Germany	1997	Off Beat	CD	O-88, SPV 085-43592
