= Tour EP (Strapping Young Lad EP) =

EP by Strapping Young Lad
- Released: 2003
- Genres: Extreme metal, death metal, heavy metal
- Length: 24:34
- Label: Century Media
- Producer: Devin Townsend

Strapping Young Lad chronology
| No Sleep 'till Bedtime (1998) | Tour EP (2003) | Strapping Young Lad (2003) |

Tour EP is an EP released by Canadian extreme metal band Strapping Young Lad. The EP was sold at live shows as a promo for their then-upcoming self-titled album, Strapping Young Lad. The EP includes alternate mixes of two tracks from Strapping Young Lad, two live tracks and "Oh My Fucking God". Only 2500 copies of Tour EP were pressed.

== Track listing ==
| No. | Title | Length |
|---|---|---|
| 1. | "Devour" | 2:55 |
| 2. | "Aftermath" | 6:49 |
| 3. | "Oh My Fucking God" | 3:28 |
| 4. | "In the Rainy Season" (live) | 4:57 |
| 5. | "Detox" (live) | 6:25 |

== Personnel ==
- Devin Townsend – vocals, guitar, production
- Jed Simon – guitar
- Gene Hoglan – drums, percussion
- Byron Stroud – bass guitar
