= Digital Line =

Studio album by Memorain
- Released: 2013
- Genre: Thrash metal
- Length: 28:15
- Label: Metal Scrap Records
- Producer: Ilias Papadakis

Memorain chronology
| Evolution (2012) | Digital Line (2013) | Seven Sacrifices (2013) |

Digital Line (2013) is an album by Greek thrash metal band Memorain. This album is a compilation of old songs the band originally recorded for Digital Crimes (2002) and White Line (2003) and have been rerecorded with the bands' line-up new sound.

== Track listing ==
All tracks are written by Ilias Papadakis, except where noted

Digital Line
| No. | Title | Music | Length |
|---|---|---|---|
| 1. | "The Real World" | | 04:10 |
| 2. | "Until You Die" | | 03:28 |
| 3. | "Inside My Mind" | | 03:16 |
| 4. | "Burning Justice" | | 04:11 |
| 5. | "Condemn Me To Obscurity" | | 04:16 |
| 6. | "Digital Crimes" | Ilias Papadakis, Kostas Bagiatis | 03:29 |
| 7. | "Silence" | | 01:56 |
| 8. | "Buried In Lies" | | 03:29 |
| Total length: | | | 28:15 |

== Personnel ==
- Ilias Papadakis – guitars
- Jason Mercury – guitars
- Andreas Boutos – vocals
- Dimitris Anestis – bass
- Tolis Mistiloglou – drums
