= Out for Blood (Unit:187 album) =

Studio album by Unit:187
- Released: October 5, 2010
- Genre: Industrial metal
- Length: 48:36
- Label: Vendetta Music
- Producer: Tod Law; John Morgan; Chris Peterson; Ross Redhead

Unit:187 chronology
Capital Punishment (2003)	Out for Blood (2010)	Transfusion (2012)

Out for Blood is the fourth studio album by Unit:187, released on October 5, 2010 by Vendetta Music.

== Reception ==
Fredrik Croona of Brutal Resonance criticized the vocal performances on Out for Blood as being lackluster and said "what this band lacks are really good synthesizer melodies to support the heavily distorted guitars and the blasting drumbeats." Connexion Bizarre called Out for Blood "a powerful album, brimming with emotional performances" and "a wonderful throwback to the golden age of industrial rock: for someone whose musical upbringing was centred around the likes of Ministry, Stiff Miners, Die Krupps, Klute and so forth, it's nothing short of sublime." Trubie Turner of ReGen awarded the album three out of five stars, saying "despite its impressive production and composition, Out for Blood definitely suffers from a tendency to blend together due to its lack of divergence in tempo and gives an overall feeling of being stuck in one gear the entire time" and its "an impressive, heavy, and gritty coldwave showcase that unfortunately comes across as too restrained."

== Track listing ==
No.	Title	Writer(s)	Length
1.	"Sick Obsession"	Law, Marshall, Morgan, Peterson, Redhead	5:36
2.	"Rolling Vengeance"	Law, Marshall, Morgan, Peterson, Redhead	4:31
3.	"Threatened"	Di Prisco, Law, Morgan, Peterson, Redhead	5:14
4.	"Living to Die"	Law, Morgan, Peterson, Redhead	5:16
5.	"Guilty Pleasures"	Law, Marshall, Morgan, Peterson	3:14
6.	"DDD"	Di Prisco, Law, Morgan, Peterson, Redhead	4:34
7.	"Lethal Injection"	Law, Marshall, Morgan, Peterson, Redhead	5:22
8.	"Kurva"	Law, Peterson, Redhead	4:20
9.	"The Wait" (Killing Joke cover)	Coleman, Glover, Ferguson, Walker	3:58
10.	"Sofadermatosis"	Law, Morgan, Peterson, Redhead	6:31

== Personnel ==
Adapted from the Out for Blood liner notes.

Unit:187

- Tod Law – lead vocals, programming, production
- John Morgan – programming, keyboards, arrangements, production
- Ross Redhead – guitar, bass guitar, production

Additional personnel

- Jared Slingerland – additional guitar (9)
- Kerry Vink – additional vocals (8)

Production and design

- Chris Peterson – programming, keyboards, noises, production
- Dave Dutton – photography
- Liam Hayes – cover art, design
- Ken Marshall – additional production, mixing
- Greg Reely – mastering

== Release history ==
Region	Date	Label	Format	Catalog
United States	2010	Vendetta Music	CD, DL	VM0035
