= Transfusion (album) =

Remix album by Unit:187
- Released: March 27, 2012
- Genre: Electro-industrial
- Length: 68:42
- Label: Vendetta Music

Unit:187 chronology
Out for Blood (2010)	Transfusion (2012)

Transfusion is a remix album by Unit:187, released on March 27, 2012 by Vendetta Music.

== Reception ==
Michael Davis of Brutal Resonance gave the album a seven out of ten and said "Transfusion is a good remix album that really does play to the strengths of not just the band's music, but the remixers themselves." COMA Music Magazine called the album "a solid work with solid remixes and it feels cohesive and well done" and awarded it three and a half out of five stars. I Die: You Die also gave it a positive review and said "on the whole each remixer does such an in-depth job refashioning the source material that there's rarely any sense of overlap or redundancy on Transfusion." Reflections of Darkness critic Kira Kalinina praised the remixers for bringing introducing lighter elements into the music but criticized the mixes for burying the vocals and for the overall lack of musical variety.

== Track listing ==
All tracks are written by Tod Law, Ken Marshall, John Morgan, Chris Peterson and Ross Redhead

No.	Title	Remixer(s)	Length
1.	"Rolling Vengeance" (Remix)	Hiwatt Marshall & cEvin Key	5:34
2.	"Threatened" (Rom Diprisco Remix)	Rom Di Prisco	3:29
3.	"Sick Obsession" (Stiff Valentine Remix)	Stiff Valentine	4:22
4.	"Blood for Blood"		4:19
5.	"Threatened" (Knifed Remix)	Craig Johnsen and Jared Slingerland	3:41
6.	"Living to Die" (Necrotek Remix)	Necrotek	5:40
7.	"DDD" (iVardensphere)	Ivardensphere	6:47
8.	"Rolling Vengeance" (C((o))de Blue Remix)	C((o))de Blue	5:41
9.	"Kurva" (16 Volt Remix)	16volt	5:41
10.	"Rolling Vengeance" (Deathproof Remix)	Deathproof	4:12
11.	"DDD" (Witchmaker Remix)	Witchmaker	5:37
12.	"Threatened (End Threat)" (Glitch Mode Mix)	Cyanotic	5:03
13.	"Rolling Vengeance" (Mindless Faith Remix)	Mindless Faith	5:17
14.	"Threatened" (Mono-Amine's Poppy Remix)	Mono-Amine	4:43

Bonus tracks
No.	Title	Remixer(s)	Length
15.	"Threatened" (Revolution State Remix)	Revolution State	3:53
16.	"Anger Management" (Funker Vogt Remix)	Funker Vogt	6:14
17.	"Lethal Injection" (Die Rostigen Löffel Remix)	Die Rostigen Löffel	5:16
18.	"Second Class Citizen" (RK Mix)	RK	4:46
19.	"Threatened" (The Peoples Republic of Europe Remix)	The Peoples Republic of Europe	4:00
20.	"Lethal Injection" (MM6 Remix)	MM6	4:16

== Personnel ==
Adapted from the Transfusion liner notes.

Unit:187

- Tod Law – lead vocals, instruments
- John Morgan – instruments
- Ross Redhead – instruments

Production and design

- Liam Hayes – photography

== Release history ==
Region	Date	Label	Format	Catalog
United States	2012	Vendetta Music	CD, DL	VM0048
