= Stillborn (EP) =

EP by Unit:187
- Released: November 4, 1997
- Genre: Industrial
- Length: 40:48
- Label: 21st Circuitry

Unit:187 chronology
Loaded (1997)	Stillborn (1997)	Capital Punishment (2003)

Stillborn is an EP by Unit:187, released on November 4, 1997, by 21st Circuitry. For the songs to be played on the radio in the United States label owner Don Blanchard had to remove profanity from several of the tracks to create radio edits.

== Reception ==
Professional ratings
Review scores
Source	Rating
AllMusic	2.5/5 stars

AllMusic awarded Stillborn two and a half out of five stars. Aiding & Abetting commented that the material featuring contributions from other musicians was of high quality but criticized the album for not living up to Loaded and said "the only real problem here is that three of the nine tracks are radio edits, which basically shorten good songs into mindless (and less interesting) snippets." Sonic Boom called the album "quite a disappointment" and "as a result, unless you are a radio DJ, don't bother with this EP as the new album Loaded has all of this material in a much better represented format." Fabryka Music Magazine awarded the album a two out of four.

== Track listing ==
All tracks are written by Tod Law, John Morgan, Jed Simon and Byron Stroud, except "Planet Claire" by Henry Mancini, Kate Pierson, Fred Schneider, Keith Strickland, Cindy Wilson and Ricky Wilson.

No.	Title	Remixer(s)	Length
1.	"Stillborn" (Radio Edit)		3:01
2.	"Stillborn" (Satoven Mix)	John Morgan	4:41
3.	"Looking at the Love Load (I Need Nobody But Me)"	Big Mac Daddy and a Side of Fries	5:01
4.	"Nobody" (Radio Edit)		4:52
5.	"Loaded" (Hate Dept. Mix)	Steven Seibold	4:43
6.	"Dead Dog" (Open Surgery Mix)	Unit:187	5:07
7.	"Lardass" (Remix Radio Edit)	John Morgan + Tod Law	5:26
8.	"Dead Dog" (Punter Mix)	Unit:187	4:55
9.	"Planet Claire" (The B-52's cover)		3:01

== Personnel ==
Adapted from the Stillborn liner notes.

Unit:187

- Tod Law – lead vocals, remixing (6, 7, 8)
- John Morgan – programming, remixing (2, 3, 7, 8)
- Jed Simon – guitar, remixing (6, 8)
- Byron Stroud – bass guitar, remixing (6, 8)

Additional personnel

- Steven Seibold – remixing (5)
- Devin Townsend – remixing (3)

Production and design

- tara ntula – design

== Release history ==
Region	Date	Label	Format	Catalog
United States	1997	21st Circuitry	CD	21C.CD29
Germany	1997	Off Beat	CD	O-113
