= Ani Kyd =

Canadian musician

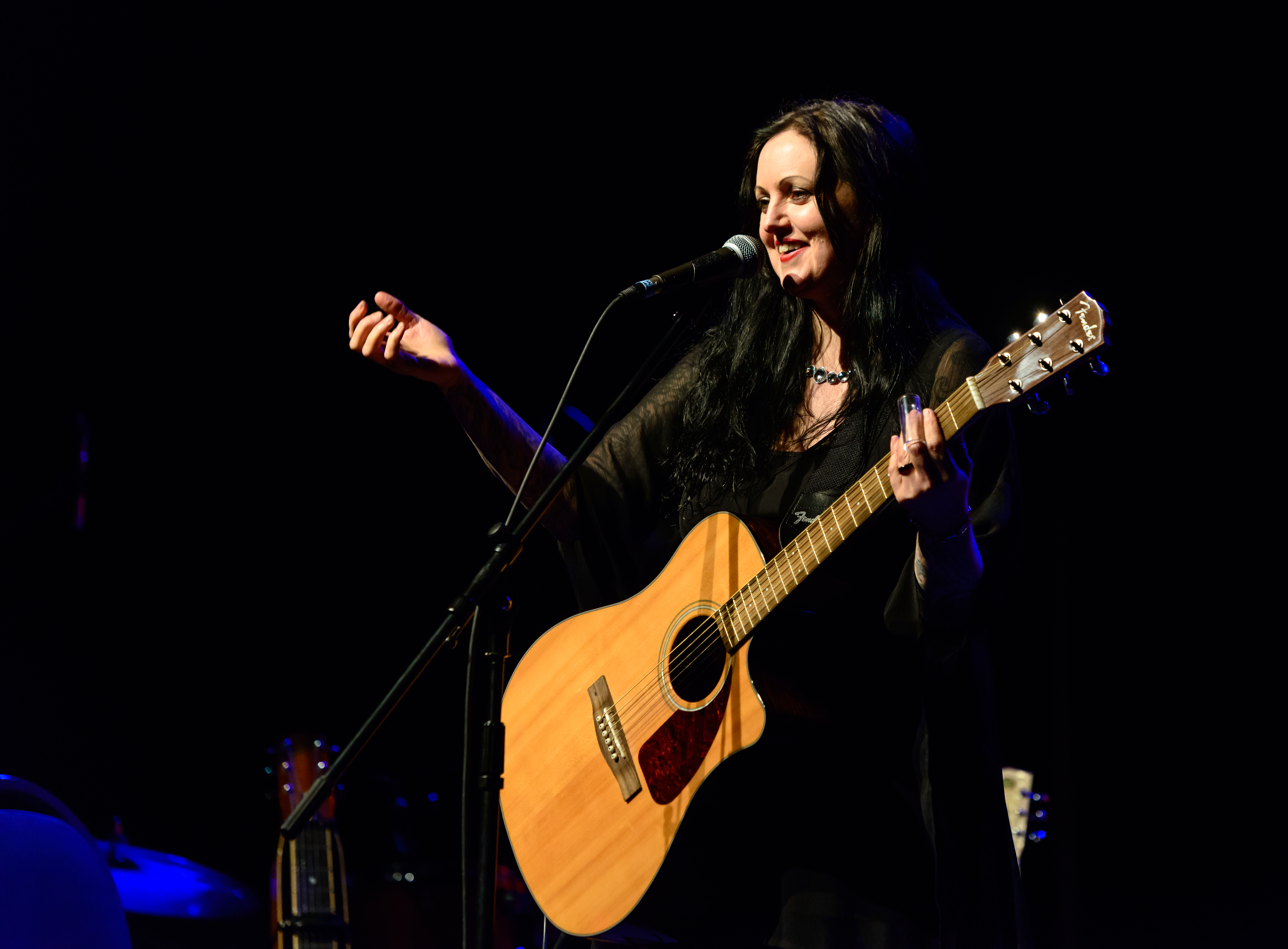
- Ani Kyd in 2016

Background information
- Born: September 15, 1969 (age 56)
- Origin: Ontario/Vancouver, B.C. Canada
- Genres: Heavy metal, punk rock, blues
- Occupations: Musician, Actor, Life Coach
- Instruments: Guitar, vocals
- Years active: 1986–present
- Labels: Alternative Tentacles, Independent
- Website: Website

Ani Kyd (born September 15, 1969) is a Canadian, Vancouver-based musician, actor, and life coach.

== Career ==
Kyd has worked with musicians including Meegan Bradfield (Limblifter), Lisa Wagner (Cello player for Moist), Gene Hoglan (Strapping Young Lad), and Byron Stroud (Fear Factory). She has played guitar for THOR as well as having Jello Biafra produce and perform back up vocals for her debut album, Evil Needs Candy Too, which was released on Alternative Tentacles in 2005. From 2005 to 2007 she sang in the two lead singer metal/rock band Approach The Throne, with Chris "Val" Valagao (Zimmers Hole) as the other singer. Throughout Kyd's professional career she has sung back up vocals for Paul Hyde, Sandy Scofield, Strapping Young Lad (on the album Alien), and the Devin Townsend Band. She has also been on various compilations including Trooper tribute and a Green Party album featuring Bruce Cockburn and Bill Henderson, Joe Keithley (D.O.A.), and Bif Naked.

She was nominated for favourite local female in the Georgia Straight Music Awards 2000. She acted alongside Jello Biafra in the movie The Widower. She has played shows with Our Lady Peace, Bif Naked, Paul Hyde, Strapping Young Lad, DOA, the Melvins, and Jello Biafra, and performed approximately 500 live shows from 1986 to 2010 including November 29, 2003, at the Pacific Coliseum in Vancouver, British Columbia, with THOR and D.O.A. and on May 1, 2004, at BC Place, Vancouver for (Slam City Jam). Kyd has been a member of over 12 bands from 1986 to 2010. She has done four major Canadian and US tours, including a 40-city tour playing guitar for Thor.

Ani Kyd was turned into a cartoon character in the Futurama/Simpsons comic - issue #2 of 2, 2002, "Infinitely Secret Crossover Crisis" page 2.

== Music videos ==
Artist	Year	Song title	Role	Director	Link
Thor	2002	"Fubar is a Super Rocker"	Guitar player	Michael Dowse	
Ani Kyd Blues Experience	2009	"Run and Hyde"	Lead singer, songwriter	Marcus Rogers	
The New Pornographers	2002	"Your Daddy Don't Know"	Lead Role – Ring Leader	Michael Dowse	
Strapping Young Lad	2003	"Relentless"	Ani was producer on this video	Marcus Rogers	

== Discography ==
=== Albums ===
Evil Needs Candy Too (Alternative Tentacles 2005)

1. Rejoyce
2. Creepy Feeling
3. Taste My Lips
4. My 1st Kill
5. Fingerpainting
6. Six Californian Dollars
7. 13
8. Left Holding the Bag
9. Erase
10. Left Right Left
11. So Far
12. Lost
13. Stranger Things
14. Silver Cage
15. Hardway Home
16. The Involuntary Admittance of Jack Ryd. By Michael Kyd

Ani Kyd Blues Experience (Independent 2009)

1. 2 Guns
2. Alone is for me
3. Reckless Soul
4. Run and Hyde
5. Dirty Blues
6. Miss V
7. Simply You
8. Waste of Time
9. Why do you love me
10. One step behind

=== Compilations ===
Grrrls with Guitars Compilation Volume 1 (1999) Grrrls with Guitars Records also featuring Kinnie Starr, Sandy Scofield

- "The Sun In My Eyes"

Shot Spots (2001) on Visionary Records. A Trooper tribute album also featuring DOA, Real McKenzies, SNFU

- "Boy With A Beat"

The Green Revolution (2004) also featuring Jello Biafra, Randy Bachman, Bruce Cockburn, Bif Naked, and Joe Keithley

- "Wish You Dead"

=== Back-up vocals ===
- Sandy Scofield "Dirty River"(1994) Independent back-up vocals on "Big House"
- Paul Hyde "Turtle Island" back-up vocals on "Love Is All", and "Happy Train"
- Strapping Young Lad "Alien" and "Strapping Young Lad"
- Jello Biafra And The Guantanamo School Of Medicine "The Audacity Of Hype" back-up vocals on "Pets Eat Their Masters", "Electronic Plantation"
