= Tenet (Canadian band) =

Thrash metal band

Background information
- Genres: Thrash metal; death metal
- Years active: 1996–c. 2009
- Labels: Century Media
- Past members: Jed Simon; Glen Alvelais; Byron Stroud; Gene Hoglan; Steve Souza; Adrian Erlandsson; Stuart Carruthers; Rob Urbinati; Steve Wheele

Tenet (stylized in all caps) was a Canadian thrash metal band formed as a side project by Jed Simon of Strapping Young Lad and Zimmers Hole. They released one album, Sovereign, in 2009.

== History ==
Tenet was formed by Jed Simon in the summer of 1996. Together with Steve Wheeler (Zimmers Hole's drummer at the time), they started getting Simon's ideas down to demo-tape form, but while both continued playing with their respective bands, nothing much happened for Tenet apart from some casual jam-sessions, which among others also included musicians like Stu Carruthers (Grip Inc.). Simon had met guitarist Glen Alvelais (ex-Forbidden) in 1997 when Strapping Young Lad was touring with Testament, with whom Alvelais was playing at the time. After becoming friends, Simon asked Alvelais to join Tenet.

=== Sovereign (2009) ===
After signing a deal with Century Media Records, Simon began working on Sovereign with bassist Byron Stroud (Fear Factory, Strapping Young Lad, Zimmers Hole) as well as drummer Adrian Erlandsson (At the Gates, the Haunted, Cradle of Filth, Paradise Lost, Brujeria). After reviewing the fact that not enough attention could be devoted to the project by Erlandsson, due to the large geographical distance and other pending commitments, Simon turned back to his longtime partner Gene Hoglan (Death, Dark Angel, Strapping Young Lad, Testament) to take care of the final drum duties. Tenet was still looking for a vocalist, though after a few auditions, Steve "Zetro" Souza (Legacy/Exodus) was selected for the album. It was mixed by Simon together with Vincent Wojno and mastered by Andy Sneap.

After many years of delays and setbacks, Tenet finally released their debut album, Sovereign, on July 20, 2009, in Europe (August 11, 2009, in the United States).

== Band members ==
Last known lineup

- Jed Simon – guitars
- Glen Alvelais – guitars
- Byron Stroud – bass
- Gene Hoglan – drums
- Steve Souza – vocals

Past members

- Adrian Erlandsson – drums
- Stuart Carruthers – bass
- Rob Urbinati – vocals
- Steve Wheeler – drums

== Discography ==
- Sovereign (2009)
