= Shitlist =

Shitlist or shit list may refer to:

== Music ==
- Shitlist, 1987 album by Macabre (band)
- "Shitlist," song by L7 from their 1992 album Bricks Are Heavy
- "Shitlist," song by Unit:187 from their 1996 album Unit:187
- "Shitlist," song by DevilDriver from their 2011 album Beast
