= Alien (Strapping Young Lad album) =

Studio album by Strapping Young Lad
- Released: March 22, 2005
- Recorded: August 19 – November 2004
- Studio: The Armoury (Vancouver)
- Genre: Industrial metal; thrash metal; extreme metal
- Length: 54:45
- Label: Hevy Devy, Century Media
- Producer: Devin Townsend, Strapping Young Lad

Strapping Young Lad chronology
Strapping Young Lad (2003)	Alien (2005)	The New Black (2006)

Devin Townsend chronology
Devlab (2004)	Alien (2005)	Synchestra (2006)

Alien is the fourth studio album by Canadian extreme metal band Strapping Young Lad. It was released on March 22, 2005. The album was written by Devin Townsend and Gene Hoglan over a six-month time period. The album reached No. 32 on the Billboard Heatseekers chart and No. 35 on the Top Independent Albums chart.

== Background ==
Townsend was diagnosed with bipolar disorder around 1998, a condition that was unknowingly exacerbated by his alcohol and drug use at the time. To compensate, he was prescribed anti-psychotic medication, but by the time of the writing and recording of Alien, he began expressing doubt about the initial diagnosis, and decided to stop taking the medication, but continued with his substance abuse, and he eventually "flipped out" during the process, and called the resulting album "toxic" and "psychologically very unhealthy".

Townsend and Hoglan were the primary writers of the album, since Simon and Stroud were busy with other commitments. Townsend has stated that the easiest track to record for the album was "Zen", and the most difficult track to record, "Skeksis", was his favourite. The making of Alien was documented and made viewable online on Century Media's official site in February 2005. It was also available as a bonus DVD of the limited first edition of the album. The band recorded a cover of Tom Jones's "What's New Pussycat?" that was scheduled to appear on Alien, but it was not recorded entirely because "it did not fit the flow" of the album. The song is not expected to be released anytime, even though Blabbermouth.net has reported so.

Due to some kind of error, the unmastered promotional release of Alien (and subsequently the early leaks of the album on the internet) contained the longer version of "Love?" and a version of "We Ride" which had most of the guitar solos missing. Also, on this promo release the track "Thalamus" was credited as being called "Landscape". Previous to the promotional release, press releases credited "Thalamus" as being called "Mega Bulldozer".

The voice heard during the intro to the song "Two Weeks" belongs to a British mathematician Andrew Wiles. Wiles was interviewed for an episode of the BBC documentary series Horizon that focused on Fermat's Last Theorem. The singer of Zimmers Hole, Chris Valagao Mina, provided backing vocals for several tracks on the album.

== Song information ==
"Love?" was chosen as the sole single from the album. Townsend has stated that the chorus was "ripped off" from the song "City of Love" by the band Yes. Townsend added, "I met Jon Anderson at one point and told him. He seemed to find it funny." Allmusic described the song's chorused harmonies as "King's X from hell". In 2018, the band Machine Head released the album Catharsis which contained the song "Beyond the Pale", with a riff that mirrors that of "Love?" almost note by note. Machine Head's Robb Flynn claimed that it was accidental plagiarism, that he spoke with Devin Townsend, and Devin referenced the Yes "rip off". The two musicians are on good terms.

Its accompanying music video, inspired by the cult horror film, The Evil Dead, was directed by Joe Lynch. The video garnered the band wider attention, and helped "Love?" become one of their most recognizable songs. Jed Simon admitted to having produced a video for this particular song because it had "the most commercial potential". "Love?" was originally one of two confirmed songs for an EP that was supposed to contain four new songs and four covers. Although planned for release in 2003, the EP was eventually cancelled. "Love?" appears on the soundtrack for the 2005 film The Cave. "Love?" was also featured in the 2005 video game Tom Clancy's Rainbow Six: Lockdown and later, the single was featured on the in-game radio station 106.66 The Blood, in Saints Row: The Third.

A second music video was released for the track "Zen", which would also later appear in 2007 film Shoot 'Em Up, where Clive Owen's character notices that the "Zen" music video calms a crying baby.

Townsend explained that the final track "Info Dump", an instrumental noise track, is a reflection on the panicked state of mind that ensued when he stopped taking his medication prescribed to treat his bipolar disorder. The screaming child at the end is meant to represent his realization. There are pulses of sounds heard in the middle of the track that, in Morse code, translate to the word "om". The rhythm of these sound pulses were later used to create the rhythm used at the end of "Colour Your World" on Townsend's album Ziltoid the Omniscient.

In a retrospective point of view, Townsend said that the track was "basically structured noise containing a morse code for a math equation," and that during the recording of the album he watched a television program about mathematician Andrew Wiles's solving of Fermat's Last Theorem. "[It was] a problem thought previously insolvable with a very elegant solution: X² + Y² = Z². Although I'm far from a mathematician, I enjoyed the thought that two opposing ways of thinking could be linked by a simple equation. I was just struck with that during the Alien time, and it just so happens that 'Ziltoid 2', 'Z²', is an answer for me—of how to proceed. It just seems to tie up everything, including Strapping, in a way that I think is satisfying."

== Release ==
Alien was released on March 22, 2005, selling 3,697 copies in its first week. It reached No. 32 on the Billboard Top Heatseekers chart, and No. 35 on the Top Independent Albums chart.

== Critical reception ==
Professional ratings
Review scores
Source	Rating
Allmusic	4/5 stars
Blabbermouth.net	9/10
Chronicles of Chaos	10/10
Collector's Guide to Heavy Metal	8/10
PopMatters	7/10

Critics praised Townsend's inventiveness and the dynamism of the songs in which "melody and discord meet midway"; Adrien Begrand of PopMatters wrote "Strapping Young Lad have raised the bar yet again", while Blabbermouth.net's Krista G. called it "a total and complete metalized SHIT FIT" and one of the best albums of the year. Townsend himself has gone on to state that Alien is the Strapping album that he's "most proud of".

== Track listing ==
All lyrics are written by Devin Townsend; all music is composed by Strapping Young Lad.

No.	Title	Length
1.	"Imperial"	2:17
2.	"Skeksis"	6:42
3.	"Shitstorm"	4:22
4.	"Love?"	4:53
5.	"Shine"	5:13
6.	"We Ride"	2:37
7.	"Possessions"	4:12
8.	"Two Weeks"	3:28
9.	"Thalamus"	3:58
10.	"Zen"	5:02
11.	"Info Dump"	11:56
Total length:		54:45

Japanese edition
No.	Title	Length
12.	"Zodiac" (Melvins cover)	3:59
13.	"Love?" (Extended version)	5:43
14.	"In the Rainy Season" (Live)	5:29

Australian edition
No.	Title	Length
12.	"Aftermath" (Live)	7:11

Korean edition
No.	Title	Length
12.	"Force Fed" (Live)	5:42

== Personnel ==
=== Strapping Young Lad ===
- Devin Townsend – guitar, vocals, keyboards, samples, production, engineering
- Gene Hoglan – drums
- Byron Stroud – bass guitar, associate production
- Jed Simon – guitar

=== Additional personnel ===
- Dave Young – keyboards, vocals
- Will Campagna – live keyboards
- Chris Valagao Mina – guitar, backing vocal

=== Male vocal choir ===
Rossy Living, Cam Krotche, Will Campagna, Shane Clark, Ross Gale, Christ Stanley, Will Cochrane, Ash Manning, Ross Empson, Mike Quigley, Billy Marquardt and Jeff Cook.

=== Female vocal choir ===
Laurielynn Bridger, Marnie Mains, Ani Kyd, Tammy "Tamz" Theis, Magdalena Bulak, Shay Ward, Steph Reid, Deborah Rodrigo-Tyzio, Michelle Madden, and Joanna Ussner.

=== Children vocals ===
Dorian Glaude-Living, Damian Moore, Ethan Belcourt-Lowe and Jayden Gignac.

=== Production ===
- Shaun Thingvold – engineering, mixing
- Kristina Ardron – 2nd engineering, editing
- Ryan Van Poederooyen – drum technician
- Alex Aligizakis – editing
- Scott Cooke – editing
- Bryan Seely – editing, assistant
- Rob Stefanson – assistant
- Alan Wong Moon – assistant
- Greg Reely – mastering at Green Jacket Studios
- Travis Smith – art consultant
- Per Johansson – artwork, layout design
- Omer "Impson" R. Cordell – photography

== Charts ==
Weekly chart performance for Alien
Chart (2005)	Peak position
Australian Albums (ARIA)	74
French Albums (SNEP)	156
Swedish Albums (Sverigetopplistan)	48
