= Capital punishment (disambiguation) =

Capital punishment is a legal process whereby a person is put to death by the government.

Capital Punishment may also refer to:

- Capital Punishment (Big Pun album), 1998
- Capital Punishment (Unit:187 album), 2003
- Capital Punishment (film), a 1925 silent film melodrama

== See also ==
- Capitol Punishment (book), a 2011 book about corruption in American politics
- Capitol Punishment: The Megadeth Years, an album by Megadeth
- WWE Capitol Punishment, a 2011 professional wrestling pay-per-view event
- Death penalty (disambiguation)
