= Chris Valagao =

Canadian heavy metal vocalist

Chris Valagao Mina
- Also known as: The Heathen
- Genres: Heavy metal, thrash metal, extreme metal
- Occupation: Musician
- Instruments: Vocals; guitar
- Years active: 1992–present
- Member of: Zimmers Hole
- Formerly of: Memorain, West of Hell, Mechanism
- Website: zimmersholeofficial.com

Chris "The Heathen" Valagao Mina is a Canadian singer best known as the frontman for the thrash metal band Zimmers Hole.

== Biography ==
Valagao Mina is of Portuguese and Norwegian heritage. He is the frontman and a founding member (along with Jed Simon and Byron Stroud from Strapping Young Lad and drummer Steve Wheeler) of the comedic thrash metal band Zimmers Hole. He has recorded three albums with the band. He has also performed backing vocals on several of Devin Townsend's and Strapping Young Lad's albums. During that time, he has built a strong friendship with Townsend. In 2012, Valagao Mina joined traditional heavy metal group West of Hell and released the debut album Spiral Empire. They followed up with a headlining tour across Canada and New Zealand in support for the album.

Valagao Mina is an accomplished SPFX artist and pyrotechnician for film and television, director and producer of many music videos and a builder of custom motorcycles. He has worked on special effects for the films Monkey Beach and Detective Knight: Redemption.

During his career, Valagao Mina has adopted several nicknames, most notably "The Heathen". Other nicknames include "Dr. Heathen Hooch", "E.Val" and "Lorde of Ass-Fire"

== Discography ==
=== With Zimmers Hole ===
- Bound by Fire (1997)
- Legion of Flames (2001)
- When You Were Shouting at the Devil...We Were in League With Satan (2008)

=== With Strapping Young Lad ===
- Heavy as a Really Heavy Thing (1994)
- City (1997)
- Strapping Young Lad (2003)
- Alien (2005)
- The New Black (2006)

=== With Devin Townsend ===
- Ocean Machine: Biomech (1997)
- Infinity (1998)
- Physicist (2000)
- Synchestra (2006)

=== With Mechanism ===
- Inspired Horrific (2009)

=== With West of Hell ===
- Spiral Empire (2012)

=== With Memorain ===
- Evolution (2012)
