= Evolution (Memorain album) =

Studio album by Memorain
- Released: 7 August 2012
- Studio: Expand list: White Planet Studios (guitars); Hackabolloff Studios (drums); Heathen Studios Studios (vocals); Esdegy Recording (bass); Redneck Studios (lead guitars); Watersound Studios (lead guitars)
- Genre: Thrash metal
- Length: 53:31
- Language: English
- Label: Metal Maple Records
- Producer: Ilias Papadakis

Memorain chronology
Reduced to Ashes (2006)	Evolution (2012)	Digital Line (2013)

Professional ratings
Review scores
Source	Rating
Brave Words & Bloody Knuckles	7.5/10 stars
Metal Kaoz	7/10

Evolution is the fifth studio album by Greek thrash metal band Memorain. It was released on 7 August 2012 by Metal Maple Records.

== Track listing ==
All music and lyrics composed by Ilias Papadakis, except where noted. Vocals Melodies on Rules Of Engagement by Tim "Ripper" Owens.

No.	Title	Lyrics	Music	Length
1.	"Nations On Fire"			05:54
2.	"Where Hate Lies"			04:29
3.	"The Break"			04:21
4.	"Circle"			03:25
5.	"Misery"			04:52
6.	"Rules Of Engagement"	David Ellefson		04:34
7.	"Death Shop"			04:09
8.	"Destiny Found"			04:26
9.	"A New Era"			03:37
10.	"Power Out"			04:07
11.	"Scratching The Surface (5th Hour)"	Chris Valagao	Steve Di Giorgio	05:13
12.	"Methods Of The Past"			04:24
Total length:				53:31

== Personnel ==
=== Memorain ===
- Chris Valagao – vocals
- Ilias Papadakis – guitars
- Gene Hoglan – drums
- Steve Di Giorgio – bass
- Ralph Santolla – guitars

=== Additional musicians ===
- Tim "Ripper" Owens – vocals on track 6
- David Ellefson – bass on track 6,10
- Jeff Waters – main solo on track 10
- Laura Christine – main solo on track 8
- Christian Wentz – main solo on track 11
- Marc Pattison – main solo on track 11
- Carlos Pérez – main solo on track 12

=== Production ===
- Ilias Papadakis – producer
- Haris Zourelidis – mixing & mastering at Feedback Sound
- Maria Sakantanis – illustrations, design
- Thanos Doutsis – photography
- Liza Hoglan – photography
- Colin Davis – photography
