= Tourettes (band) =

Australian heavy metal band

- Also known as: Tourettes Syndrome
- Origin: Sydney, New South Wales, Australia
- Genres: Heavy metal
- Years active: 2000–2008
- Label: Armageddon
- Past members: Michele Madden; Ross Empson; Michael Quigley; Ashley Manning

Tourettes was an Australian heavy metal band, founded in January 2000 by Ross Empson, Michele Madden, Ashley Manning and Michael Quigley. Their style has been described as "a mixture of hardcore, nu-metal and other elements to create an apoplectic and eclectic noise."

Live, the band combines performance with visual elements, which has earned them a loyal fanbase (dubbed as "SikFuks"). They have played at festivals such as Big Day Out and Wacken Open Air, as well as shows in the United States and Canada. The band provided backing vocals on the Strapping Young Lad album Alien.

During 2005 the group undertook a tour of the US, Madden described how, "I wanted to see what such a media sanitized market would do with a band like us so it was pretty cool to watch. A LOT of jaws hit the floor. Played some ace shows and I can't wait to go back and do it again." While there they recorded their album, Sicksense (October 2006), for which they used the band name, Tourettes Syndrome. Metal Rage's CarpeSiem rated the album as 66/100 with a summary that "this is a set of complex and hard to understand songs which are not easy to listen to. I can thus understand that a lot of people will just put [the album] aside, but it would be unfair to deny the quality of the complexity in this way." PH of RockFreaks rated it at 3.5/10 and felt, "I do not enjoy listening to this record. When your 'Wow is it a woman singing' wonder has settled you realise that the album is plain boring and contains absolutely nothing new. Fans of KoRn and stuff like that might like this, but that's about it."

For their next album they reverted to Tourettes and delivered, Treason Songs (October 2007). Thomas Nielsen of Power of Metal rated it at 89/100 and opined that "the experimentation is less evident although still present. Apart from the last three tracks, the album conveys a teeth-grinding, mean sounding Tourettes, full of spite and weltschmerz." Rockezine's Frank M assessed it at 3/10 and noticed "[this] is easily one of the most dreadful albums of the year. It all hinges towards death metal this time around. Of course the compulsory Swedish bits here and there are in place and furthermore they tend to really stink up the disc with some dire cliché metalcore bits."

Early in 2008 Madden joined international heavy metallers, Meldrum, alongside Laura Christine on bass guitar, Gene Hoglan on drums and Michelle Meldrum on guitar. She provided lead vocals for that group's next album, Lifer (2012), Hoglan described how "[we] are super-excited to be working with the amazingly-talented and ultra-gorgeous Michelle Madden, and we welcome her with open arms into the Meldrum family. We've been writing a ton of new, ballcrushing, METAL-as-fuck songs in celebration of the leggy one's arrival on our shores. I've had the utmost respect for the past five years, and always considered Madden to be, in every awesome and cool use of the term, a rock star." Michelle Meldrum died in May 2008 and the album's release was delayed. Tourettes had disbanded prior to Madden joining Meldrum.

== Discography ==
=== Albums ===
- Tourettes (2001)
- Sicksense (by Tourettes Syndrome) (13 October 2006) Armageddon
- Treason Songs (19 October 2007) Armageddon

=== Extended plays ===
- Detestimony (2003)

=== Singles ===
- "Rod Fuckin' Stewart" (2005)

=== Video albums ===
- Retrospective (DVD, 2005)
