= Physicist (album) =

Studio album by Devin Townsend
- Released: June 26, 2000 (International and Japanese edition); October 30, 2000 (German edition)
- Recorded: September 1999 – March 2000
- Studio: Hipposonic Studios, Vancouver, BC, Canada; Manland and Red Stripe Studio Burnaby, BC, Canada
- Genre: Progressive metal; thrash metal
- Length: 46:34
- Label: HevyDevy (International edition); SME Records (Japanese edition); InsideOut (German edition)
- Producer: Devin Townsend

Devin Townsend chronology
Infinity (1998)	Physicist (2000)	Terria (2001)

Physicist is the fourth solo album by Canadian musician Devin Townsend. The album was released on June 26, 2000, on Townsend's label, HevyDevy Records.

Physicist is distinguished from the rest of Townsend's solo portfolio for the crossing of the style of his work in Strapping Young Lad with elements that had been explored in Ocean Machine: Biomech and Infinity. Notably, the line-up of musicians featured on this album is identical to that of Strapping Young Lad.

== Background ==
Physicist took several years to come to fruition. Townsend had previously played with Metallica's then-bassist Jason Newsted, in a short-lived thrash metal project called IR8. After the creation of an IR8 demo tape, Townsend and Newsted began work on a new project called Fizzicist, which they claimed would be "heavier than Strapping Young Lad". When the IR8 tape was leaked, Newsted's Metallica bandmates James Hetfield and Lars Ulrich learned of the project. Hetfield was "fucking pissed" that Newsted was playing outside the band, and Newsted was prevented by his bandmates from working on any more side projects.

Unable to continue working with Newsted, Townsend instead wrote the album himself, calling it Physicist. Townsend assembled his bandmates from his extreme metal project Strapping Young Lad. This was the only time this lineup was featured on one of Townsend's solo albums. Townsend also had to reluctantly re-record the majority of the album after accidentally deleting it.

== Musical style ==
The album combines Townsend's style with a thrash metal influence. David Ballard of Revolver described the album's sound as "a blend of summery melody and breathtaking brutality ... vaulting between Queen-like elegance and Dark Angel-like devastation."

== Release ==
Physicist was released in June 2000 on Townsend's independent label, HevyDevy Records. It is distributed in Canada by HevyDevy, in Japan by Sony, and in Europe and North America by InsideOut. The album was released on Enhanced CD format, with a commentary on the album by Townsend.

The song "Kingdom" was re-recorded for The Devin Townsend Project's Epicloud, with vocals from Anneke van Giersbergen. Similarly, a re-recording of the song "Victim" is present on the bonus disc of Transcendence.

== Reception ==
Professional ratings
Review scores
Source	Rating
Blabbermouth.net	8/10
Blistering	10/10
Metal Hammer	9/10
Sputnikmusic	3/5 stars
Rock Hard	9.5/10

Physicist received positive reviews, but is generally considered a low point in Townsend's career. Townsend himself considers it his worst album to date. Trey Spencer of Sputnikmusic argued that while Physicist is "a pretty good listen" on its own merit, it is "one of the weakest" albums in Townsend's catalogue. He felt the album "comes off as a restrained version of Strapping Young Lad with hints of [Townsend's] other projects thrown in", and that most of the tracks don't "seem to go anywhere". In 2005, the album placed number 439 in Rock Hard magazine's book The 500 Greatest Rock & Metal Albums of All Time.

Much of the criticism of Physicist stems from its poor production. Spencer found the production "a little too reigned [sic.] in" and "muddy". This was felt by the band as well; drummer Gene Hoglan and the rest were dissatisfied with the way the sound was mixed.

== Track listing ==
All tracks are written by Devin Townsend except where noted

No.	Title	Writer(s)	Length
1.	"Namaste"		3:34
2.	"Victim"		3:15
3.	"Material"		2:47
4.	"Kingdom"		5:55
5.	"Death"	Townsend, Gene Hoglan	2:27
6.	"Devoid"		1:28
7.	"The Complex"	Townsend, Hoglan	3:31
8.	"Irish Maiden"		2:45
9.	"Jupiter"		3:36
10.	"Planet Rain"		11:08
11.	"Forgotten" (Hidden track)		5:59
Total length:			46:34

Japanese edition bonus tracks
No.	Title	Length
12.	"Man" (demo)	5:12
13.	"Ocean Machines" (demo)	8:24
14.	"Promise" (demo)	5:26
Total length:		65:36

== Personnel ==
=== Strapping Young Lad ===
- Devin Townsend – vocals, guitar, keyboards, production, engineering, arrangement
- Gene Hoglan – drums
- Byron Stroud – bass
- Jed Simon – guitar

=== Background guitars, vocals ===
- Chris Valagao Mina, guitar, vocal
- Marina Reid
- Sharon Parker
- Teresa Duke

=== Production ===
- Mike Plotnikoff – mixing
- Chris Waddell – mastering
- Shaun Thingvold – engineering, digital editing
- Paul Silviera – engineering
- Matteo Caratozzolo – engineering
- Sawami Saito – assistance
- Roger Swan – assistance
- Tracy Turner – assistance, management
- Byron Stroud – assistance
- Seventh Wave Studios – CD enhancement

=== Artwork ===
- Clint Nielsen – layout, artwork, logos
- Gary Hunter – 3-D logo rendering
- Gloria Fraser – photography
- Tania Rudy – photography

== Chart performance ==
Chart	Peak position
Oricon (Japan)	80
