= Duality of Man =

Studio album by Memorain
- Released: 16 January 2016
- Recorded: 2015
- Studio: White Planet Studios; 22 Media Production Studio; Rosanna's studio
- Genre: Thrash metal
- Length: 42:44
- Language: English
- Label: Rock of Angels Records
- Producer: Ilias Papadakis

Memorain chronology
Zero Hour (2014)	Duality of Man (2016)

Duality of Man (2016) is an album by Greek thrash metal band Memorain. It was released on 16 January 2016 by Rock of Angels Records.

== Track listing ==
All music and lyrics composed by Ilias Papadakis, except where noted.

No.	Title	Lyrics	Music	Guest Musicians	Length
1.	"Demon's Hunt"				03:19
2.	"Guardian Knight"				04:06
3.	"The Giant"	Vagelis Kolios			04:34
4.	"Last of Light"			Blaze Bayley, David Ellefson	04:06
5.	"Inside My Eyes"	Vagelis Kolios	Vagelis Kolios		04:32
6.	"The End of Hope"				03:37
7.	"Lost in Vain"				03:58
8.	"The Crescent"	Jason Mercury	Jason Mercury		04:02
9.	"Broken Dreams"		Jason Mercury, Ilias Papadakis	Michael Gilbert	03:20
10.	"Since I Remember"				03:54
11.	"The Final Message"			Steve Conley	03:16
Total length:					42:44

== Personnel ==
=== Musicians ===
- Vagelis Kolios – vocals
- Ilias Papadakis – guitars
- Jason Mercury – guitars
- Aris Nikoleris – bass
- Sevan Barsam – drums

=== Guests ===
- Blaze Bayley – vocals on track 4
- David Ellefson – bass on track 4
- Michael Gilbert – main solo on track 9
- Steve Conley – main solo on track 11

=== Production ===
- Ilias Papadakis – Producer
- Vagelis Ziakas – Recording & Mastering
- Randy Walker - Recording (David Ellefson's bass), Engineering (David Ellefson's bass)
- Maria Sakantanis – Illustrations, design
- Caio Caldas - Artwork
- Christos Magnisalis – Photography
