= Death penalty (disambiguation) =

Death penalty may refer to:

- Capital punishment, the act of the state putting a person to death

== Sports ==
- Death penalty (NCAA), the nickname for American college athletics policy which forbids a school from fielding a certain team

== Entertainment ==
- Death Penalty (album), a 1982 album by the heavy-metal band Witchfinder General
- "Death Penalty", the title track from the aforementioned Witchfinder General album
- Death Penalty (film), a 1980 television film starring Colleen Dewhurst

== See also ==
- Capital punishment (disambiguation)
