= Seven Sacrifices =

Studio album by Memorain
- Released: 2013
- Genre: Thrash metal
- Length: 46:40
- Label: Metal Scrap Records
- Producer: Ilias Papadakis

Memorain chronology
Digital Line (2013)	Seven Sacrifices (2013)	Zero Hour (2014)

Seven Sacrifices (2013) is an album by Memorain.

== Track listing ==
All tracks are written by Ilias Papadakis, except where noted

Seven Sacrifices
No.	Title	Lyrics	Music	Guest musicians	Length
1.	"A Stitch In Time"				03:51
2.	"Worlds Apart"				04:21
3.	"Course Correction"	Andreas Boutos	Jason Mercury, Ilias Papadakis		03:19
4.	"Trust And Blood"			Jed Simon	03:53
5.	"False Positive"	Andreas Boutos			03:40
6.	"The Hour Of Death"				03:30
7.	"Seven Sacrifices"			David Ellefson	05:23
8.	"Blind Spot"				03:35
9.	"Snow Falls"				05:32
10.	"Bad Wolf"	Andreas Boutos	Jason Mercury, Ilias Papadakis		04:17
11.	"We All Fall Down"			Michael Gilbert	05:19
Total length:					46:40

== Personnel ==
=== Musicians ===
- Andreas Boutos – vocals
- Ilias Papadakis – guitars
- Jason Mercury – guitars
- Dimitris Anestis – bass
- Tolis Mistiloglou – drums

=== Guests ===
- David Ellefson – bass on track 7
- Jed Simon – main solo on track 4
- Michael Gilbert – main solo on track 11
