= Foxhole (video game) =

2022 video game

- Developer: Siege Camp
- Publisher: Siege Camp
- Designers: Mark Ng; Alkas Baybas
- Artist: Adam Garib
- Writer: Matthew Rigg
- Composer: Rom Di Prisco
- Engine: Unreal Engine 4
- Platform: Windows
- Release: September 28, 2022
- Genres: Massively multiplayer online, action-strategy
- Mode: Multiplayer

Foxhole is a cooperative sandbox massively-multiplayer action-strategy video game developed and published by Canadian video game company Siege Camp, who are based in Toronto, Ontario. The game uses Unreal Engine 4, utilizing an axonometric projection perspective, much like that of a conventional real-time strategy video game with a top-down view. Foxhole's setting is inspired by early 20th century warfare. The game allows the user to join one of two factions as a soldier, having the choice of contributing to a persistent war by gathering, manufacturing, and transporting resources and supplies, providing manpower and vehicles in combat, and building and managing fortifications, with the end goal of capturing enemy territory to control a majority of the map.

The game was released for Windows via Steam's early access program in July 2017, and reached a peak of 4,813 concurrent players in under two weeks before being fully released on September 28, 2022.

== Gameplay ==
Players can align with one of two opposing factions, the Colonials and the Wardens, with each faction having different visuals, weapons, and vehicles. The role of the player is not predetermined: there is no rewarded class-based system or player progression although there is a rank system that denotes experience and social popularity. Players can progress through this rank system with commendations (often called "Commends"), points given by players to one another for good deeds. The game features a player-driven in-game economy, requiring players to use tools, such as a hammer, sledgehammer, or "harvester" in order to gather raw resources from stylized ore deposits known as "resource fields" that are indicated with map markers. Raw resources ("Scrap, Components, Coal, and Sulfur") can then be put into a refinery to be processed into materials, such as "Basic Materials" ("Bmats") and Refined Materials ("Rmats"). These materials are used to manufacture everything the faction will use in combat, including weapons, ammunition, fortifications, and vehicles.

Upon choosing a faction, the player spawns in their faction's home region, and then into an allied-controlled town hall or relic base. Certain towns have special facilities such as factories, garages, and ship yards which allow players to manufacture equipment and vehicles. When produced in factories or mass-production factories ("MPFs"), items and vehicles come in crates, which are groups of individual items that can be transported in shipping containers. There is a heavy reliance on coordinated logistics in the game, requiring organized supply runs to front line bases in order to keep players on the front line supplied with weapons and ammunition, as well as providing materials to repair and build fortifications. Because one soldier supply item ("Shirt") is consumed every time a player spawns into a base, supplying these to bases forms an important part of the logistical effort of every war.

Players are encouraged to work together to efficiently use resources, intel, vehicles, weapons, and ammunition to gain the upper hand over the opposition. Players can also plan and execute attacks with others, coordinate attacks using a map-marking system, and carry out reconnaissance to gain a tactical advantage over the opposition. A day and night cycle exists in the game, with 12 in-game hours being equal to 30 minutes in real-time, although map regions are on different cycles. A central feature of Foxhole's persistent war is the artificial intelligence (AI) system, through which certain defensive structures near friendly bases are controlled automatically, firing on enemies to defend locations even if defending players are absent.

In order to win a war, players must secure and build up a specific number of victory points (town halls that are marked out in their regions with a flag icon) across a multi-region world map. To achieve this, both teams must coordinate their logistics and their army to capture enemy town halls. The teams also work to unlock new technology through a technology tree, for which players must gather tech-specific resources at salvage fields. Cooperation is essential, as wars can go on for weeks or months. Additionally, player-led operations within areas of the game can last from days to weeks.

== Development ==
Siege Camp, originally called Clapfoot Inc. until mid 2021, conceived Foxhole in early 2016, succeeding the completion of several small-scale mobile projects. Foxhole's goal was to make a massively multiplayer war game that took place in a persistent world, leaving it up to players to drive all aspects of the war effort.

Early conceptualizations of the game explored possible features such as a first person perspective camera and a turn-based gameplay format. Ultimately, a top-down perspective was adopted to encourage a focus toward strategy and player collaboration rather than immersion. The decision was made early on in the development process for the game to take place in a fictional universe that paid creative homage to early 20th century warfare. Siege Camp's direction was centered on developing vehicle, weapon, and character designs that were original rather than historical.

Siege Camp began working on prototypes for Foxhole in early 2016, which lead to public release in pre-alpha stage in July 2016. The first iterations supported 64 players per server instance in one region, eventually leading to 120 player support. World Conquest, the primary game mode in Foxhole, was first released in March 2018. Upon release, the game mode featured 9 interlocking regions on global conflict. The map has since been expanded to a total of 53 regions.

== Reception ==
Rock, Paper, Shotgun's Brendan Caldwell discusses the gameplay of Foxhole, commenting on the logistics system, as well as general skill-based gameplay elements, along with the nature of the top-down view in the game, on their Electronic Wireless Show podcast.

An in-depth preliminary review from IGN's Lief Johnson comments on the cooperative human element of the game, saying "I enjoyed Foxhole, and I know much of that enjoyment grew out the marvel of watching so many players working together."

In late 2021 and early 2022, a group of players known as Logistics Organization for General Improvement (L.O.G.I.) began advocating for reform of the in-game logistics system, through which players provide all the materials and supplies used on the front lines. In December 2021, the organization, 1800 in number, wrote an open letter to the game's developers at Siege Camp listing the 11 "most detrimental issues to the logistics experience". In the letter, L.O.G.I. demanded "specific and detailed feedback" by 10 January 2022. No response was received by the deadline, so L.O.G.I. held votes on escalation options, resulting in a logistics strike. As a result, the strike has received significant media coverage, and a representative of the group known as Squashyhex reported "a significant increase in demands for equipment on the frontlines". This strike came to an end on March 1, following Update 48, which addressed many issues L.O.G.I. had listed in their letter.
