= Reduced to Ashes (Memorain album) =

Studio album by Memorain
- Released: 2006
- Genre: Thrash metal
- Label: EMI
- Producer: Ilias Papadakis; Haris Zourelidis

Memorain chronology
White Line (2003)	Reduced to Ashes (2006)	Evolution (2012)

Reduced to Ashes (2006) is an album by Greek metal band Memorain.

== Track listing ==
All songs written by Ilias Papadakis

1. "The Land Of Pain"
2. "The Evil Within"
3. "Blinded By The Lights"
4. "Charge"
5. "See / Hate"
6. "Reduced To Ashes"
7. "TV War"
8. "Facing My Demons"
9. "Inside My Sickness"
10. "Against My Fate"
11. "Nothing Is Left"
12. "The Lights Into The Night"

== Personnel ==
- Ilias Papadakis – guitars, vocals
- Alex Doutsis – guitars
- Kostas Bagiatis – bass
- Nick Menza – drums

=== Guests ===
- Jeff Waters – solo on track 7
