= Capital Punishment (Unit:187 album) =

Studio album by Unit:187
- Released: April 8, 2003
- Genre: Industrial metal
- Length: 49:57
- Label: COP Int'l.
- Producers: Tod Law; John Morgan

Unit:187 chronology
Stillborn (1997)	Capital Punishment (2003)	Out for Blood (2010)

Capital Punishment is the third studio album by Unit:187, released on April 8, 2003 by COP International.

== Reception ==
Fabryka Music Magazine lauded Capital Punishment for its interesting direction supported by good arrangements and production combined with Unit:187's decision to move towards a mainstream direction. Trubie Turner of ReGen said the album captures the band at their "despite its impressive production and composition, Out for Blood definitely suffers from a tendency to blend together due to its lack of divergence in tempo and gives an overall feeling of being stuck in one gear the entire time" and "an impressive, heavy, and gritty coldwave showcase that unfortunately comes across as too restrained."

== Track listing ==
All tracks are written by Tod Law and John Morgan, except "Lust Poison #9" and "Angels" co-written with Chris Peterson.

No.	Title	Remixer(s)	Length
1.	"Capital Punishment"		5:06
2.	"Lust Poison No. 9"		5:11
3.	"Anger Management (Part 1)"		4:23
4.	"Angels"		5:16
5.	"Second Class Citizen"		5:20
6.	"Anger Management (Part 2)"		6:31
7.	"Infested"		7:35
8.	"Euphoria"		6:30
9.	"Second Class Citizen" (Decreemix)	Decree	4:05

== Personnel ==
Adapted from the Capital Punishment liner notes.

Unit:187

- Tod Law – lead vocals, instruments, production
- John Morgan – instruments, production

Additional personnel

- Sean Lawson – remixing (9)
- Ross Redhead – remixing (9)
- Serena Whitters – backing vocals (3)

Production and design

- Ken Marshall – mastering
- Chris Peterson – additional production (2, 4, 5), remixing (9)
- Anthony Valcic – mixing, editing
- Jeff Walker – cover art, design

== Release history ==
Region	Date	Label	Format	Catalog
United States	2003	COP Int'l.	CD, DL	COP 071
