= Unit:187 (album) =

Studio album by Unit:187
- Released: February 6, 1996
- Studio: Various: Yaletown Sound; (Vancouver, BC); Red Stripe Studios; (Vancouver, BC)
- Genre: Industrial metal
- Length: 55:07
- Label: 21st Circuitry
- Producer: Matteo Caratozzolo; John Morgan

Unit:187 chronology
| Unit:187 (1996) | Loaded (1997) |

Unit:187 is the debut studio album of Unit:187, released on February 6, 1996, by 21st Circuitry.

== Reception ==
Professional ratings
Review scores
| Source | Rating |
|---|---|
| Allmusic | 3/5 stars |

Allmusic awarded Unit:187 three out of five possible stars. Fabryka Music Magazine lauded the album's dynamic presentation of noise in using a fusion of guitar and drum driven aggression with trance like music. Black Monday credited the album's diverse range of emotions and said the band explore the "heart of a grinding aural firehouse, obliterating most watered-down "industrial" that has been flooding the market as of late."

Aiding & Abetting gave Unit:187 a mixed reception, noting that the band's misdirection in experimentation leaves the music feeling dull but credited the album for comprising "nicely experimental industrial stuff that doesn't mind mixing it up with the heaviest of elements." Sonic Boom praised the band's inventive approach to speed metal, describing them as "what may be the first electronic thrash outfit," but criticized the tone of the lyrics as hindering to the depth of the music.

== Track listing ==
All tracks are written by Tod Law, John Morgan and Ashley Scribner.

| No. | Title | Length |
|---|---|---|
| 1. | "F.O.A.D." | 3:58 |
| 2. | "Burn" | 4:30 |
| 3. | "Waiting for Jesus" | 4:52 |
| 4. | "Lardass" | 4:53 |
| 5. | "Pointless" | 3:58 |
| 6. | "Crackhead" | 5:13 |
| 7. | "Shitlist" | 4:40 |
| 8. | "Lifosuction" | 4:32 |
| 9. | "Agnostic" | 4:44 |
| 10. | "Debauch" | 9:27 |
| 11. | "Crackhead" (Tensor-Vision Remix) | 4:19 |

== Personnel ==
Adapted from the Unit:187 liner notes.

Unit:187

- Tod Law – lead vocals, cover art
- John Morgan – electronics, programming, production
- Ashley Scribner – guitar, sampler
- Byron Stroud – bass (1, 5)

Production and design

- Matteo Caratozzolo – production, recording, mixing and editing (1, 2, 4–7, 9–11)
- John Fyssas – recording, mixing and editing (3, 8)
- Pierre Internoscia – cover art
- Sub.Tech – illustrations

== Release history ==
| Region | Date | Label | Format | Catalog |
|---|---|---|---|---|
| United States | 1996 | 21st Circuitry | CD | 21C.CD12 |
