= WESTCOM =

WESTCOM or WestCom may refer to:

- United States Army Western Command
- WestCom, a German recording company
