= Galen Waling =

American industrial rock and punk drummer, born 1986

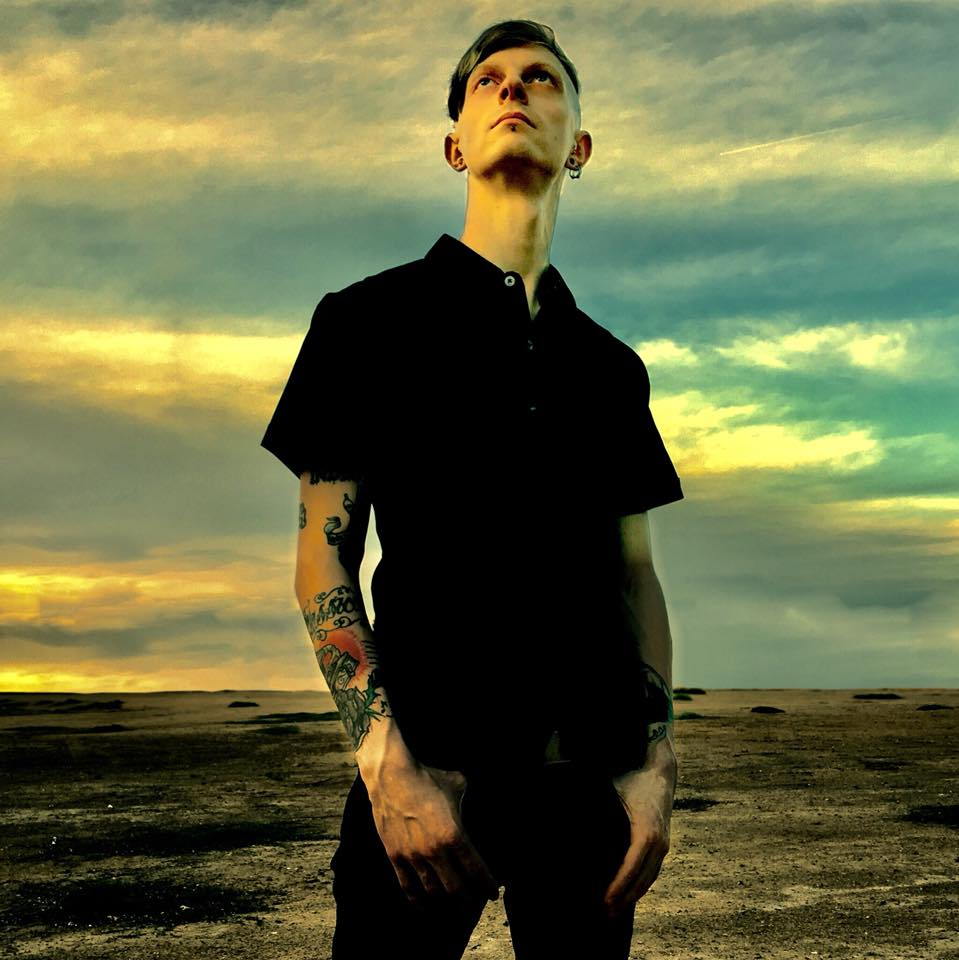
- Waling in 2018

Background information
- Born: 1986 (age 39–40)
- Genres: Industrial, punk, rock, metal
- Occupation: Drummer
- Member of: Lords of Acid, Julien-K
- Website: galenwaling.com

Galen Waling (born 1986) is an American–Canadian dual citizen rock and metal drummer. He was the drummer for Left Spine Down and Stiff Valentine, and is currently the drummer for Julien-K. He has also worked with SMP, 16volt, Unit:187, PIG, and Lords of Acid.

== Biography ==
Waling grew up in Kirkland, Washington, where he began learning to play the drums at the age of three thanks to a family friend. In 2005, Waling began touring with the band Desillusion.

== Studio and touring work ==
Waling became known for his precision, style and ability to adapt to many different styles of music. Ilker Yücel of ReGen magazine wrote that "Waling has become one of the industrial and machine rock scene’s most reliable and sought-after drummers."
