= Heavy as a Really Heavy Thing =

Studio album by Strapping Young Lad
- Released: April 4, 1995
- Recorded: December 1994
- Studio: Mushroom Studios (Vancouver, Canada), Greenhouse Studios (Vancouver, Canada)
- Genre: Industrial metal; thrash metal; death metal
- Length: 39:44
- Label: Century Media
- Producer: Devin Townsend

Strapping Young Lad chronology
Heavy as a Really Heavy Thing (1995)	City (1997)

Devin Townsend chronology
Sex & Religion (1993)	Heavy as a Really Heavy Thing (1995)	Punky Brüster – Cooked on Phonics (1996)

Heavy as a Really Heavy Thing is the debut studio album by Canadian extreme metal band Strapping Young Lad. It was released on April 4, 1995. Century Media Europe released a remastered version of the album on June 12, 2006, which includes the video for "S.Y.L.", several bonus tracks, and a 12-page booklet containing extended liner notes.

== Background ==
Strapping Young Lad began in 1994 as a solo project of Canadian musician Devin Townsend. Following his work as vocalist on Steve Vai's 1993 album Sex & Religion and its 1994 tour, Townsend believed he had been a "musical whore", spending "the first five years of [his] career working at the behest of other people". During a brief stint as touring guitarist for The Wildhearts, Townsend received a phone call from an A&R representative for Roadrunner Records, expressing an interest in his demos and an intention to sign him. The offer was ultimately rescinded by the head of Roadrunner, who regarded Townsend's recordings as "just noise". He faced further rejection by Relativity Records, the label behind Vai's Sex & Religion, who saw no commercial appeal in his music. Century Media Records subsequently contacted the musician, offering him a contract to "make us some extreme albums". Townsend agreed to a five-album deal with the record label.

Following his tour with The Wildhearts, Townsend began recording and producing his debut album, Heavy as a Really Heavy Thing, under the moniker Strapping Young Lad. According to Townsend, the recording process took "about a week". Embracing The Wildhearts' anarchist approach, "while focusing on dissonance and just being as over-the-top as [he] could", Townsend sang on the record and performed the majority of its instrumental tracks (with the assistance of a drum machine). Drummer Adrian White notably performed on multiple songs, along with co-writing four tracks as well. Various other local session musicians and friends of Townsend also appeared on the album, such as Chris Meyers (founder of Econoline Crush and former member of Townsend's side project Noisescapes), Greg Price (founder of Waiting for God and another former member of Noisescapes), and guitarist Jed Simon (who would become a long-time member of Strapping Young Lad). Townsend ultimately recruited White on drums, Simon on guitar, Ashley Scribner on bass, and Mike Sudar on guitar to tour in support of Heavy as a Really Heavy Thing.

"S.Y.L." (1995)
"S.Y.L.", the opening track on Heavy as a Really Heavy Thing, demonstrates Townsend's musical approach at the time: "Songs didn't really matter; it was just the intensity and the vibe plus lots of humor".

== Release and reception ==
Professional ratings
Review scores
Source	Rating
Chronicles of Chaos	7/10
Collector's Guide to Heavy Metal	6/10
The Encyclopedia of Popular Music	4/5 stars
Guitar World	4 stars
Kerrang!	4/5 stars
Metal Storm	7.7/10

Released on April 4, 1995, Heavy as a Really Heavy Thing was not widely recognized in the metal community. The album sold 143 copies in its first six months, but received favorable reviews from the heavy metal press. Its unusual musical ideas—a synthesis of death, thrash, and industrial metal influences—prompted Andy Stout from Metal Hammer to call it "one of the most disturbing albums you'll hear for a very long time".

Nevertheless, Townsend has repeatedly expressed his distaste for the recording. He dismissed the album in the liner notes of the record's 2006 reissue, contending that it contained only two great songs. He also deemed its production poor in interviews, referring to the album as "basically a collection of demos that were remixed". When Century Media advertised the reissue of Heavy as a Really Heavy Thing as the "rebirth of a genre-defying classic", Townsend called it "record company bullshit".

The album was remastered and re-released on June 12, 2006, by Century Media Europe. The re-release contains several bonus tracks taken from international versions of the album, an unreleased track, and the video for "S.Y.L.".

== Track listing ==
All tracks are written by Devin Townsend except where noted.

No.	Title	Writer(s)	Length
1.	"S.Y.L."	Townsend, Adrian White	4:47
2.	"In the Rainy Season"	Townsend, White	4:37
3.	"Goat"		3:30
4.	"Cod Metal King"		5:08
5.	"Happy Camper (Carpe B.U.M.)"	Townsend, White	3:00
6.	"Critic"		4:07
7.	"The Filler – Sweet City Jesus"		5:24
8.	"Skin Me"		3:29
9.	"Drizzlehell"		3:09
10.	"Satan's Ice Cream Truck"		2:33
Total length:			39:44

2006 reissue bonus tracks
No.	Title	Writer(s)	Length
11.	"Japan"	Townsend, White	5:18
12.	"Monday"		5:14
13.	"Exciter" (Judas Priest cover)	Rob Halford, Glenn Tipton	6:04

== Personnel ==
- Devin Townsend – guitars, vocals, keyboards, programming, child voice on Track #1

=== Additional musicians ===
- Adrian White – drums
- Jed Simon – additional guitar ("Critic", "Skin Me")
- Chris Byes – drums ("Critic", "The Filler: Sweet City Jesus")
- Chris Meyers – additional keyboards ("Goat", "Skin Me")
- Greg Price – assistant on drum programming ("Skin Me", "Drizzlehell")
- Smokin' Lord Toot – drums ("Cod Metal King")
- Stooly and E: Val Yum – Bon Jovi gang vocals
- Ashley Scribner – bass
- Mike Sudar – guitar

=== Production ===
- Devin Townsend – mixing, editing, production, arrangements, art direction (as Nived)
- Blair Calibaba – engineering
- Rod Michaels – additional engineering ("Critic")
- Greg Reely – editing, mixing
- Jason Mausa – mixing ("The Filler: Sweet City Jesus")
- Jamie Myers – additional editing
- Doctor Skinny – additional mixing
- Brian Gardner – mastering
- Tania Rudy – photography
- Byron Stroud – photography
- Robert Lowden – cover art
- Borivoj Krgin – A&R
