= Strapping Young Lad (album) =

Studio album by Strapping Young Lad
- Released: February 11, 2003
- Recorded: September–October 2002
- Studios: Armoury, Hipposonic and Diamond Sharp Studios (Vancouver, Canada)
- Genres: Industrial metal; thrash metal; death metal
- Length: 39:01
- Label: Century Media
- Producer: Strapping Young Lad

Strapping Young Lad chronology
No Sleep 'till Bedtime (1998)	Strapping Young Lad (2003)	Alien (2005)

Devin Townsend chronology
Terria (2001)	Strapping Young Lad (2003)	Accelerated Evolution (2003)

Strapping Young Lad (occasionally referred to as SYL) is the third album by Canadian extreme metal band Strapping Young Lad. It was released on February 11, 2003.

== Background ==
In December 2001 Townsend announced that, contrary to his earlier public statements, a new Strapping Young Lad album would be released in 2002. He emphasized that he was not "forcing" his product upon fans to generate record sales, arguing that his band—and its contract with Century—was never a lucrative endeavour. Instead, Townsend's motivation was the "creative anger" sparked by the September 11, 2001 attacks and further cultivated during their 2001 tour, although Townsend would later downplay this as a factor. For the first time, the album would be a product of collaborative writing; the band wrote "about half" of the material on the 2001 Foot in Mouth Tour, and the rest at home, starting January 2002. After playing a small number of festivals in 2002, Strapping Young Lad entered the studio in September of that year, to record their third album.

== Music ==
Initial writing for the album reached as far back as 2000, when the track "Idom" was released on the soundtrack for Tekkōki Mikazuki; this is a demo containing pieces later used for "Dire," "Consequence," and "Aftermath." The album's sound was somewhat of a departure from Strapping Young Lad's previous albums, Heavy as a Really Heavy Thing and City. Devin Townsend's vocals contain much more singing than before but also a lot of death growls and screaming, and rather than the blinding extreme metal/industrial metal styled songs of Heavy as a Really Heavy Thing and City, many of the songs were structured and produced in a manner more akin to traditional death metal. The overall tone is darker and more serious in nature and contains less overt tongue-in-cheek humour than other SYL releases. The raw production style in particular is different from other records Devin has produced; he would later on call the album "murky" and "dreadful sounding" and claimed that he "phoned [it] in". The slightly different sound on this album can in part be attributed to the fact that second guitarist Jed Simon plays the vast majority of rhythm guitars. This was due to Townsend's concurrent production and recording of Accelerated Evolution by The Devin Townsend Band, which was released only a few weeks later. In an interview with Enslain Magazine, drummer Gene Hoglan had this to say about the more raw sound on the album; "the next album came out in 2003 and that was the self-titled 'SYL', that was a little more raw bare-bones record, we didn't want to repeat 'City', because 'City' was like sample-heavy, and totally, we were being called an industrial band and all that sort of bullshit, and by the time we did 'SYL', we liked being a metal band, so it was just a pretty raw metal record, not over-the-top samples or keyboards, or even the vocals weren't layered, and so that brought us to 2004 when we started writing 'Alien'".

== Release and critical reception ==
Professional ratings
Review scores
Source	Rating
AllMusic	4/5 stars
Brave Words & Bloody Knuckles	9/10
Chronicles of Chaos	8/10
Collector's Guide to Heavy Metal	8/10
The Encyclopedia of Popular Music	4/5 stars
Metal.de	8/10
Rock Hard	9/10

Strapping Young Lad was released on February 11, 2003, and became the band's first charting album, entering Billboard's Top Heatseekers at No. 97. The album received moderate critical success. Nate Smith from Rockzone.com called it a "solid addition to the Townsend catalog", but "not an instant classic". Xander Hoose from Chronicles of Chaos called it "a good album", but said that it is inferior to City. Alec A. Head of Satan Stole My Teddybear wasn't impressed, writing, "Sadly, the songwriting putters out into a flaccid, heartless, faux-epic quagmire of riffs that have no destination, vocals that lack the ferocity and pure, unadulterated anger and emotion that Townsend exhibited on City, and an altogether forced, cold, and directionless sense of songwriting." Strapping Young Lad differed from Heavy as a Really Heavy Thing and City in that it was less industrial and more reminiscent of death metal; the humour pervading the previous two albums became more subdued.

== Track listing ==
All tracks are written by Strapping Young Lad.

No.	Title	Length
1.	"Dire"	1:10
2.	"Consequence"	4:02
3.	"Relentless"	3:04
4.	"Rape Song"	3:09
5.	"Aftermath"	6:46
6.	"Devour"	2:54
7.	"Last Minute"	3:58
8.	"Force Fed"	5:24
9.	"Dirt Pride"	2:40
10.	"Bring On the Young"	5:54
Total length:		39:01

Live bonus tracks
No.	Title	Length
11.	"Detox" (only available on Australian release)	6:40
12.	"Underneath the Waves" (only available on Japanese release)	4:00

== Personnel ==
=== Strapping Young Lad ===
- Devin Townsend – guitar, vocals, keyboards, samples, engineering, production
- Gene Hoglan – drums
- Jed Simon – guitar, keyboards, samples, choir, chorus
- Byron Stroud – bass, choir, chorus

=== Additional guitars, vocals ===
Chris Valagao Mina, Ani Kyd, Tammy Theis, Marnie Mains, Carla Levis, and Laurielynn Bridger.

=== Heavy metal choir ===
Glenn Thomson, Denton Booth, Charlie Goler, Juanita English, Jeremy Glen, Blackie LeBlanc, Henry Goler, Jay Mosdell, Samanta Palomino, Eden Wagonner, Christ Stanley, Scarlet Stanley, Stuart Carruthers, Sue Carruthers, Sean Carruthers, Denis, Stevie J., La Sparka, Rossy Living, Dev, Jed and Byron.

=== Production ===
- Strapping Young Lad – production
- Paul Silveira – engineering
- Shaun Thingvold – engineering, mixing
- Misha Rajaratnam – engineering
- Carla Levis – assistant engineering
- Byron Stroud – project coordination
- Louie Teran – mastering
- Kurt Dahle – drum technician
- Daniel Michael Collins – photography
- Nico Wobben – photography
- Travis Smith – visuals

== Charts ==
Chart performance for Strapping Young Lad
Chart (2003)	Peak position
Australian Albums (ARIA)	64
