= White Line (album) =

Studio album by Memorain
- Released: 2003
- Genre: Thrash metal
- Label: NMC Music
- Producer: Ilias Papadakis; Haris Zourelidis

Memorain chronology
Digital Crimes (2002)	White Line (2003)	Reduced to Ashes (2006)

White Line (2003) is an album by Memorain.

== Track listing ==
All songs written by Ilias Papadakis, except "High Treason", written by Ilias Papadakis, Kostas Bagiatis and Panos Andricopoulos.

1. "The Real World"
2. "Buried in Lies"
3. "Condemn Me to Obscurity"
4. "Inside My Mind"
5. "White Line"
6. "Silent Cry"
7. "High Treason"
8. "My Choice"

== Credits ==
- Ilias Papadakis – guitars, vocals
- Kostas Bagiatis – bass
- Panos Andricopoulos – drums

=== Guests ===
- James Murphy – solos on tracks 2,4,5,6,7
