= Digital Crimes =

Studio album by Memorain
- Released: 2002
- Genre: Thrash metal
- Label: NMC Music
- Producer: Ilias Papadakis; Haris Zourelidis

Memorain chronology
Digital Crimes (2002)	White Line (2003)

Digital Crimes (2002) is an album by Memorain.

== Track listing ==
All songs written by Ilias Papadakis, except "Digital Crimes", "Last War - Final Day", written by Ilias Papadakis and Kostas Bagiatis, and "Visions Of Darkness", written by Ilias Papadakis and Panos Andricopoulos

1. "Digital Crimes"
2. "Until You Die"
3. "Bones"
4. "Alone"
5. "Turned on You"
6. "Extend of Life"
7. "Burning Justice"
8. "Last War - Final Day"
9. "Silence"
10. "Visions of Darkness"

== Credits ==
- Ilias Papadakis – guitars, vocals
- Alex Doutsis – guitars
- Kostas Bagiatis – bass
- Panos Andricopoulos – drums
