= Memorain =

Greek thrash metal band

- Origin: Athens, Greece
- Genre: Thrash metal
- Years active: 1999–present
- Labels: NMC (2002−2005); EMI Music Greece (2005−present); Thanatology Productions; Fono Ltd.
- Members: Ilias Papadakis; Jason Mercury; Vagelis Kolios; Aris Nikoleris; Nick Yngve
- Past members: Andreas Boutos; Dimitris Anestis; Tolis Mistiloglou; John Karathanasis; Panos Andricopoulos; Nick Menza; Ralph Santolla; Chris Valagao; Steve Di Giorgio; Gene Hoglan
- Website: memorain.com

Memorain is a Greek thrash metal band formed by guitarist/vocalist Ilias Papadakis in 1999.

== History ==
After a lineup changes in 2001, the band recorded their first demo CD, Until You Die. Drawing from American heavy/thrash metal, the band contributed a song for the Voices of Death Part 5 compilation album. A few months later, they covered Megadeth's "Disconnect" for the album Droogie – A Megadeth Tribute.

In August 2002, the band signed a two-record deal with local label NMC Music, and released their first album, Digital Crimes, a couple of months later. In 2003, Memorain released their second album, White Line, featuring guitarist James Murphy (Testament, Obituary, Death, etc.). The band contributed songs to numerous compilation albums. In September 2003, the band composed the music theme for Greek metal TV show, TV War, supported by Greek Metal Hammer magazine. In September 2005, Memorain signed with EMI Music Greece. Two months later, the band started recording the album Reduced to Ashes with drummer Nick Menza (ex-Megadeth) and special guest Jeff Waters (Annihilator). Recorded partially in Los Angeles, Reduced to Ashes was released by EMI Greece in April 2006. After five years, the band re-entered the studio in 2011 with a new line-up featuring Ralph Santolla, Chris Valagao, Steve Di Giorgio, and Gene Hoglan to record their fourth full-length album, Evolution, released in 2012. The following year, Memorain, with a new lineup, released an eight-track album called Digital Line, including re-recordings of songs from their first two official albums, and their seventh studio release, Seven Sacrifices. In September 2014, the band announced that they had recorded their eight studio album, Zero Hour.

== Members ==
=== Current members ===
- Ilias Papadakis – guitar
- Nikolas Perlepe – guitar
- Vagelis Kolios – vocals
- Babis Kapageridis – bass
- Sevan Barsam – drums

=== Former members ===
- Jason Mercury – guitars
- Andreas Boutos – vocals
- Dimitris Anestis – bass
- Tolis Mistiloglou – drums
- John Karathanasis – bass
- Panos Andricopoulos – drums
- Alex Doutsis – guitars
- Kostas Bagiatis – bass
- Marc Reign – drums
- Nick Menza – drums
- Ralph Santolla – guitars
- Chris Valagao – vocals
- Steve Di Giorgio – bass
- Gene Hoglan – drums
- Nick Yngve – drums

== Discography ==
=== Studio albums ===
- Digital Crimes (2002)
- White Line (2003)
- Reduced to Ashes (2006)
- Evolution (2012)
- Digital Line (2013)
- Seven Sacrifices (2013)
- Zero Hour (2014)
- Duality of Man (2016)

=== Music videos ===
- "TV War" (2007)
- "False Positive" (2014)
- "Divided" (2015)
- "Guardian Knight" (2016)
