= Jed Simon =

Canadian guitarist

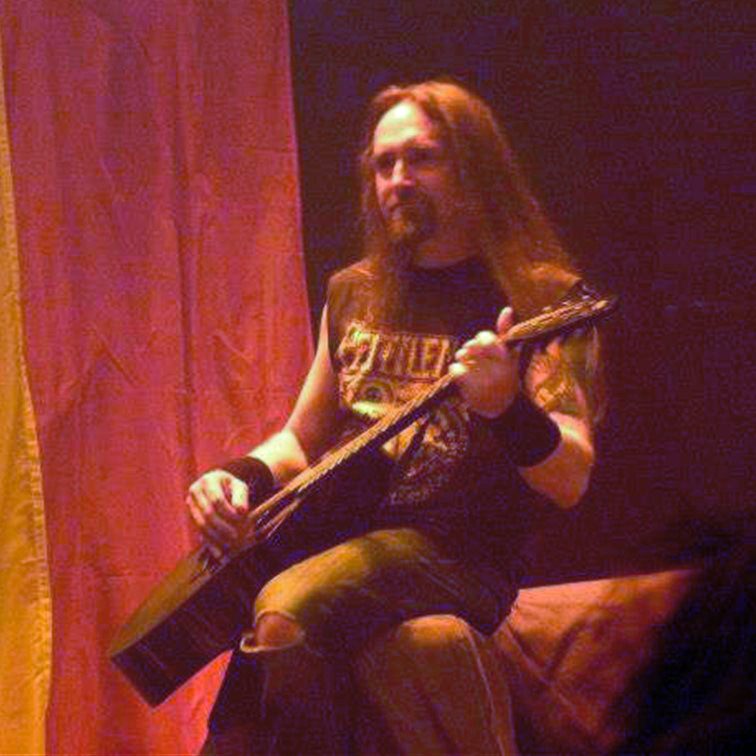
- Simon performing with the Devin Townsend Project at The Retinal Circus 2012

Background information
- Born: Jedson Louis Simon; February 27, 1964 (age 62); Victoria, British Columbia, Canada
- Genres: Thrash metal, death metal, industrial metal, extreme metal
- Occupations: Musician, songwriter
- Instruments: Guitar; vocals
- Years active: 1985–present

Jedson Louis Simon (born February 27, 1964) is a Canadian guitarist. He was a member of supergroup Scar the Martyr and has been a member of numerous bands, including Front Line Assembly, Strapping Young Lad, Zimmers Hole, Tenet, and Vimic.

== Biography ==
Simon was born on February 27, 1964, in Victoria, British Columbia. He gained attention in the metal community with his third speed metal band Armoros, which was founded in 1985. Armoros disbanded in 1989 after two successful demos and an album.

Simon's next band was Caustic Thought, when his career with Byron Stroud began. Simon did three demos with Caustic Thought, and when he left them, he gave the job to Devin Townsend. After Caustic Thought, Simon briefly worked with Townsend on his Noisescapes project, who then left for Los Angeles to play with Steve Vai. In 1995, Townsend asked Simon to join his latest project, Strapping Young Lad (aka SYL), and Jed was a part of SYL until the band's split in 2007. Simon contributed guitars to Heavy as a Really Heavy Thing and also performed as a live member for the tour of the album. Simon also appears in the video for S.Y.L. from the same album.

In 1996, Simon joined Front Line Assembly (FLA for short) on their Hard Wired tour as a touring guitarist (and also percussionist on Plasticity and Gun f.ex.). There was a live album and video done from the tour, which became known as Live Wired (1996). After that, Simon returned with SYL, who achieved even greater success with their second album City (1997) with Chris Valagao Mina.

When Front Line Assembly went on to perform the Re-Wind tour in late 1998, Simon was on board again. In 1999, he also contributed guitars to FLA's studio album Implode. Simon's last tour with FLA was the Implosion tour in the spring of 1999. In 2000, Simon worked on Townsend's Physicist project, which is composed of all four members of SYL, but was considered "too light" by Devin to be an SYL album.

In 2002, SYL released their self-titled album, on which Simon plays virtually all the guitar tracks, giving the album a distinctive, slightly warmer sound than any of Strapping Young Lad's other albums. In 2005 they released Alien, and their final recording, The New Black, was released on July 11, 2006.

He is also the guitarist of Zimmers Hole, which includes fellow Strapping bandmates, Stroud, Gene Hoglan, and Chris Valagao. Zimmers Hole has released three studio albums: Bound by Fire (1997, and which was re-issued in 2003 with extra tracks), Legion of Flames (2001), and When You Were Shouting at the Devil...We Were in League With Satan, which was released on Century Media records on March 11, 2008.

His solo project is Tenet, whose first album, Sovereign, was released on Century Media records in summer 2009. Sovereign was written by Simon over the years leading up to the recording of the album, and features Simon on guitar and his old band mates Stroud on bass and Hoglan on drums, along with Steve Souza (Exodus) on vocals, and Glen Alvelais (Forbidden, Testament, LD50) on lead guitar. In 2010, Simon was the touring guitarist with the band City of Fire, which includes Stroud and Fear Factory lead vocalist Burton C. Bell.

On October 27, 2012, Simon joined Townsend on stage at his Retinal Circus event, held at the Camden Roundhouse in London, where they played the SYL songs "Detox" and "Love?", as well as the Devin Townsend Project songs "Bend it like Bender!" and "Little Pig". From 2013 to 2016, Simon was a member of Scar the Martyr, a new project of Slipknot drummer Joey Jordison, as full time lead guitarist alongside Kris Norris. In 2016 the band folded and reformed as Vimic.

In March 2018, Simon was announced as a member of a new band Imonolith featuring former Strapping Young Lad bandmate Byron Stroud, former Devin Townsend Project members Brian Waddell and Ryan Van Poederooyen, and Threat Signal vocalist Jon Howard. Simon would go on to leave Imonolith in October of the same year.

== Gear ==
Simon has used ESP guitars for many years. Both he and his Strapping Young Lad bandmate Devin Townsend endorsed ESP. Simon also endorsed Bernie Rico Jr. guitars, but he later switched to Jackson Guitars. As of breaking out with Vimic he returned to using ESP.

== Discography ==
=== With Armoros ===
- Remember Michelle (demo) (1988)
- Pieces (1988)

=== With Caustic Thought ===
- Sore (demo) (1991)

=== With Strapping Young Lad ===
Studio albums

- Heavy as a Really Heavy Thing (1995) – guitars on "Critic" and "Skin Me"
- City (1997)
- Strapping Young Lad (2003)
- Alien (2005)
- The New Black (2006)

Extended Plays

- Tour EP (2003)
- C:enter:### (2007)

Live albums

- No Sleep 'till Bedtime (1998)
- For Those Aboot to Rock: Live at the Commodore (video album) (2004)

Compilation albums

- 1994–2006 Chaos Years (2008)
- The Complete Works (Box Set) (2013)

=== With Devin Townsend ===
- Physicist (2000)
- The Retinal Circus (Live video album) (2013)

=== With Tenet ===
- Demo 2003 (2003)
- Sovereign (2009)

=== With Zimmers Hole ===
- Bound by Fire (1997)
- Legion of Flames (2001)
- When You Were Shouting at the Devil... We Were in League with Satan (2008)

=== With Scar the Martyr ===
- Scar the Martyr (2013)

=== With Vimic ===
- Open Your Omen (2025)

=== With Front Line Assembly ===
Studio albums

- Implode (1999)

Live albums

- Live Wired (1996)

=== Guest appearances ===
- 1996: Punky Brüster – Cooked on Phonics (additional vocals (as Ace Longback))
- 2009: Sacrifice – The Ones I Condemn (guitars on "The Devil's Martyr")
- 2013: Memorain – Seven Sacrifices (guitars on "Trust and Blood")
- 2014: The Haunted – Exit Wounds (guitars on "Trend Killer")
- 2015: Krisiun – Forged in Fury (guitars on "Scars of Hatred")
- 2015: Nihilate – Damnation (single) (guitar solo)
