= Stiff Valentine =

Canadian heavy metal band

- Origin: Vancouver, British Columbia, Canada
- Genres: Industrial rock, alternative rock, heavy metal
- Years active: 2006–present
- Label: WTII Records
- Members: "Loud" Chris DeMarcus; Kerry "Babz" Peterson; Galen "Wail" Waling; Craig "Hollywood" Jensen
- Website: secondbestcanadianbandever.com

Stiff Valentine is a Canadian heavy metal band from Vancouver, British Columbia. Their synthesis of genre has been called "Industrial-EBM-Hard-Rock-Synth-Pop-Punk".

Stiff Valentine has shared members with Sounds of Mass Production, 16 Volt, Chemlab, KMFDM, Front Line Assembly, Left Spine Down, and Dismantled.

== Members ==
Current live members

- "Loud" Chris DeMarcus – vocals, guitar
- Kerry "Babz" Peterson – vocals, keyboards
- Craig "Hollywood" Jensen – guitar and drums
- Galen Waling – drums

Known guest members

- Jason Bazinet – drums
- Eric Powell – vocals
- Steve White – guitar
- Jared Slingerland – guitar
- Adam "Too Much" Johnson – bass
- Craig Huxtable – keyboards
- Matt Sheppard – keyboards
- Kaine Delay – vocals
- Darin Wall – bass
- Daniel Belasco – guitar and keyboards
- Gabriel Shaw – vocals
- Alex King – vocals
- Jon Sheppard – percussion

== Discography ==
=== Albums ===
- Industrial Metal Disco (2009)
- America Bleeding (2011)
- America Inbreeding (2012)
- Empire of Illusion (2013)
- Empire of Death (2014)

=== EPs ===
- DigiTrash EP (2006)
- Loveless EP (2008)

=== Compilations ===
- WTII Minifest 2 (2011)
- WTII Records Sampler Spring 2012 (2012)
- Electronic Saviors Volume 2: Recurrence (2012)
- WTII Records 2013 Sampler (2013)
- Electronic Saviors Volume 3: Remission (2015)

=== Remixes ===
- Left Spine Down – Reset (Stiff Valentine Remix) (2009)
- 16volt – Become Your None (Smp Vs Stiff Valentine) (2010)
- am.psych – Disease (Stiff Valentine Remix Feat. DeathProof) (2011)
- Unit·187 – Sick Obsession (Stiff Valentine Remix) (2012)
- Ego Likenss – Treacherous Thing (Stiff Valentine Remix) (2012)
- Microwaved – Gave Up (Stiff Valentine Remix) (2012)
- Vein Collector – Trapped (Deathproofed Mix By Stiff Valentine) (2012)
- Reign Forced – Dichotomy (Deutsche Harte Mix By Stiff Valentine) (2012)
- Aesthetic Perfection – Antibody (Stiff Valentine Mix) (2013)

== See also ==
- Front Line Assembly
- 16volt
- Sounds of Mass Production
- KMFDM
- Left Spine Down
- Dismantled
- Industrial rock
