= Decree (band) =

- Origin: Vancouver, British Columbia, Canada
- Genre: Industrial rock
- Years active: 1991–present
- Labels: Decibel, Off Beat, Metropolis, Minuswelt Musikfabrik, Irond, Artoffact
- Members: Chris Peterson; Sean Lawson; Ross Redhead; Matt Pease
- Past members: John McRae; Jeff Stoddard

Decree is a Canadian industrial rock band from Vancouver that was founded by Chris Peterson and John McRae in 1991. However, writing and gathering ideas started around 1989. Both musicians have also been working together at the beginning of the 1990s in the electronic music band Will.

Decree released their debut album, Wake of Devastation, in 1996. They subsequently released Moment of Silence in 2004 and Fateless in 2011. In 2018, Artoffact Records released a vinyl collection of the band's albums on vinyl.

== Discography ==
- Wake of Devastation (1996, Decibel, Off Beat)
- Moment of Silence (2004, Metropolis, Minuswelt Musikfabrik, Irond)
- Fateless (2011, Artoffact)

== Band members ==
=== Current members ===
- Chris Peterson – keyboard, programming, percussion, engineering
- Sean Lawson – vocals, noise
- Ross Redhead – guitar, bass, cello
- Matt Pease – percussion

=== Former members ===
- John McRae – vocals
- Jeff Stoddard – guitar

== Television appearance ==
The band is featured in "Dance of the Dead", the third episode of the first season of Tobe Hooper's Masters of Horror, performing a song in the "Doom Room" bar.
