= Strapping Young Lad =

Canadian metal band

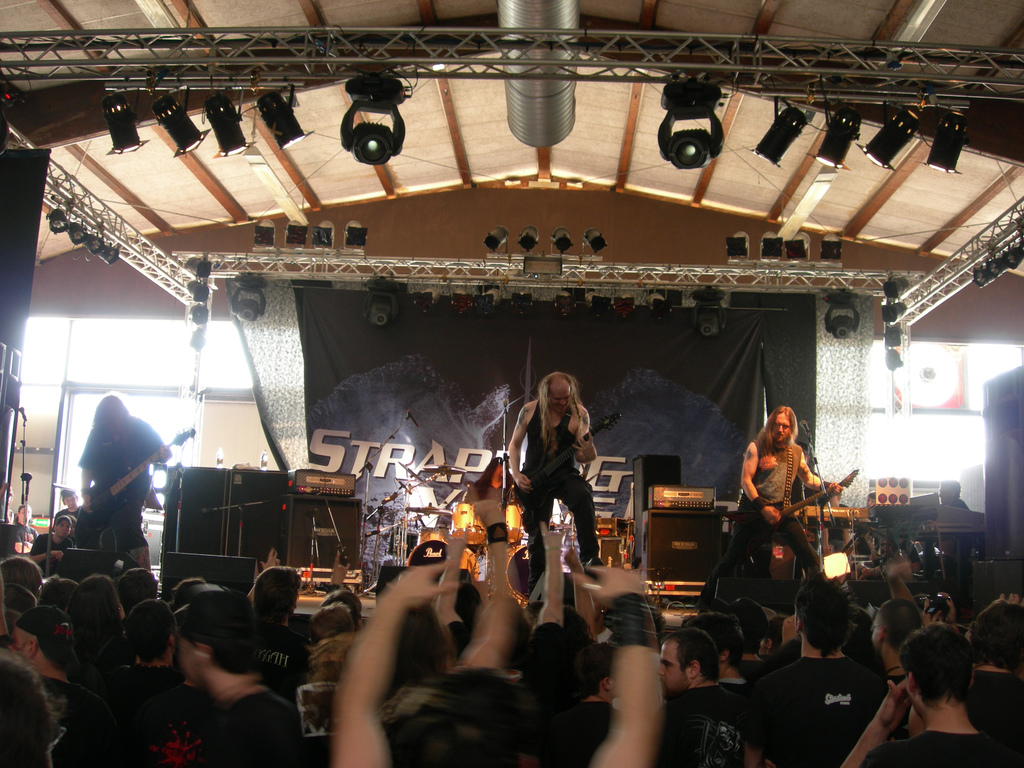
- Strapping Young Lad at the Tribute to Flame Fest 2006

Background information
- Origin: Vancouver, British Columbia, Canada
- Genres: Industrial metal; thrash metal; death metal
- Years active: 1994–1998; 2002–2007
- Label: Century Media
- Past members: Devin Townsend; Jed Simon; Byron Stroud; Gene Hoglan; Adrian White; Chris Bayes; Chris Meyers; Ashley Scribner; John Morgan; Chris Valagao Mina; Mike Sudar; Matteo Caratozzolo

Strapping Young Lad (SYL) was a Canadian extreme metal band formed by Devin Townsend in Vancouver in 1994. The band started as a one-man studio project; Townsend played most of the instruments on the 1995 debut album, Heavy as a Really Heavy Thing. By 1997, he had recruited permanent members; this line-up, which consisted of Townsend on vocals and guitar, Jed Simon on guitar, Byron Stroud on bass, and Gene Hoglan on drums, lasted until the band's dissolution.

Strapping Young Lad's music was characterized by the use of polyrhythmic guitar riffing and drumming, blast beats and wall of sound production. The band's musical direction was mainly determined by Townsend, whose battle with mental health and dark sense of humor were major influences on his songwriting. Townsend was also noted for his eccentric appearance and on-stage behavior, which greatly contributed to the band's intense live performances.

The band gained critical success and a growing underground fanbase from their 1997 album City. After a hiatus between 1999 and 2002, the band released three more albums, reaching their commercial peak with the 2006 effort, The New Black. Townsend disbanded Strapping Young Lad in May 2007, announcing his decision to retreat from public view while continuing to record solo albums.

== History ==
=== Heavy as a Really Heavy Thing and City (1994–1998) ===
Strapping Young Lad began in 1994 as a solo project of Canadian musician Devin Townsend. Following his work as vocalist on Steve Vai's 1993 album Sex & Religion and its 1994 tour, Townsend believed he had been a "musical whore", spending "the first five years of [his] career working at the behest of other people". During a brief stint as touring guitarist for The Wildhearts, Townsend received a phone call from an A&R representative for Roadrunner Records, expressing an interest in his demos and an intention to sign him. The offer was ultimately rescinded by the head of Roadrunner, who regarded Townsend's recordings as "just noise". He faced further rejection by Relativity Records, the label behind Vai's Sex & Religion, who saw no commercial appeal in his music. Century Media Records subsequently contacted the musician, offering him a contract to "make us some extreme albums". Townsend agreed to a five-album deal with the record label.

Following his tour with The Wildhearts, Townsend began recording and producing his debut album, Heavy as a Really Heavy Thing, under the moniker Strapping Young Lad. According to Townsend, the recording process took "about a week". Embracing The Wildhearts' anarchist approach, "while focusing on dissonance and just being as over-the-top as [he] could",

"S.Y.L." (1995)
"S.Y.L.", the opening track on Heavy as a Really Heavy Thing, demonstrates Townsend's musical approach at the time: "Songs didn't really matter; it was just the intensity and the vibe plus lots of humor".

Released on April 4, 1995, Heavy as a Really Heavy Thing was not widely recognized in the metal community. The album sold 143 copies in its first six months, but received favorable reviews from the heavy metal press. Its unusual musical ideas—a synthesis of death, thrash, and industrial metal influences—prompted Andy Stout from Metal Hammer to call it "one of the most disturbing albums you'll hear for a very long time". Nevertheless, Townsend has repeatedly expressed his distaste for the recording. He dismissed the album in the liner notes of the record's 2006 reissue, contending it contained only two great songs. He also deemed its production poor in interviews, referring to the album as "basically a collection of demos that were remixed". When Century Media advertised the reissue of Heavy as a Really Heavy Thing as the "rebirth of a genre-defying classic", Townsend called it "record company bullshit".

Townsend recruited a permanent line-up for the second album: Jed Simon on guitar, Byron Stroud on bass, and Gene Hoglan on drums. City was released on February 11, 1997, and received highly favorable critical reception. Kerrang! praised the album for its heaviness, claiming it sounded like "sticking your head into the jet nozzle of a Stealth Bomber", while Metal Hammer ranked it No. 13 on its "Top 20 Albums of 1997" list. The album soon gained a cult following and a loyal fan base for the band. City is considered to be the band's best effort by a large number of fans and critics alike. In 2002, the album was No. 45 on Revolver magazine's "69 Greatest Metal Albums of All Time" list, and also appeared on their "Must Have Metal Albums" list in 2005. It also appeared on the "100 Most Important Albums of the Nineties" list conducted by Terrorizer. Townsend himself stated City "is the real Strapping record. That's the ultimate one out of all of them".

The band embarked on a world tour in 1997 to promote the album, which included dates in Europe, the US and Australia. In the spring of 1997, guitarist and singer Chris Valagao Mina joined Strapping Young Lad to play on the Full international and European tours. On May 30, 1998, they performed at the Dynamo Open Air festival in Eindhoven, Netherlands, then continued touring the next month in Europe. In June 1998, the group released No Sleep 'till Bedtime, a live album containing songs performed at a 1997 performance at the HiFi Bar and Ballroom in Melbourne, Australia. Century Media was not initially interested in releasing a live record, but impressed with Townsend's production, the label agreed to release it. The band closed the year playing a few more dates in Japan and Australia.

=== On hiatus (1999–2002) ===
At the end of 1998, Townsend placed Strapping Young Lad on hiatus to concentrate on his solo career and on his work as a record producer. He had already released two solo albums, Ocean Machine: Biomech in 1997 and Infinity in 1998 and produced several other artists' albums. Townsend explained numerous conflicts with Century Media, and his struggle with bipolar disorder (for which he checked himself into a psychiatric hospital in early 1998), contributed to the curtailment of Strapping Young Lad's activities:

What happened? I signed a shitty deal, but luckily it was non-exclusive. I got tired of doing Strapping so I said, 'I can't do it anymore.' Then I freaked out and went into a hospital. My lawyer said that I was under mental duress when I signed the contract so the contract is void. At that point it was like, 'I just won't do another Strapping record.' Yeah, I went down saying 'CM was the shittiest label ever.' And they went down as saying that I was 'a complete, arrogant psychopath.'

Townsend remained productive between 1999 and 2002, recording two more solo albums, with Chris Valagao Mina Physicist in 2000 and Terria in 2001, and producing albums for Zimmers Hole, Stuck Mojo and Soilwork, among others. Although Strapping Young Lad was officially on hiatus, they gave occasional live performances, including an appearance on the Foot In Mouth Tour in 2001 with Fear Factory. During this period, Townsend's bandmates were active musically; both Stroud and Hoglan recorded with other bands, and all three were involved in Townsend's solo efforts as studio musicians and as part of his live band as well. Hoglan and Simon also formed a side project called Tenet with Grip Inc. bassist Stuart Carruthers and Interzone frontman Rob Urbinati in early 2002.

In December 2001 Townsend announced, contrary to his earlier public statements, a new Strapping Young Lad album would be released in 2002. He emphasized he was not "forcing" his product upon fans to generate record sales, arguing his band—and its contract with Century—was never a lucrative endeavor. Instead, Townsend's motivation was the "creative anger" sparked by the September 11, 2001 attacks and further cultivated during their 2001 tour. For the first time, the album would be a product of collaborative writing; the band wrote "about half" of the material on the 2001 Foot In Mouth Tour, and the rest at home, starting January 2002. After playing a small number of festivals in 2002, Strapping Young Lad entered the studio in September of that year, to record their third album.

=== Strapping Young Lad and Alien (2003–2005) ===
The self-titled Strapping Young Lad was released on February 11, 2003, and became the band's first charting album, entering Billboard's Top Heatseekers at No. 97. The album received moderate critical success, Nate Smith from Rockzone.com called it a "solid addition to the Townsend catalog", but "not an instant classic", Xander Hoose from Chronicles of Chaos called it "a good album", but also pointed out it is inferior to City. Strapping Young Lad differed from City because it was less industrial and more reminiscent of death metal; the humor pervading the previous two albums became more subdued.

The band toured heavily throughout 2003 and 2004, making stops in the United States, Europe, Canada, and Australia. Although Townsend stated Strapping Young Lad might be the last album, the band re-signed with Century Media Worldwide in March 2004 and announced plans for a new album.

Alien was released on March 22, 2005, selling 3,697 copies in its first week. It reached No. 32 on the Billboard Top Heatseekers chart, and No. 35 on the Top Independent Albums chart. Critics praised Townsend's inventiveness and the dynamism of the songs in which "melody and discord meet midway"; Adrien Begrand of PopMatters wrote that "Strapping Young Lad have raised the bar yet again", while Blabbermouth.net's Krista G. called it one of the best albums of the year. Townsend and Hoglan were the primary writers of the album, since Simon and Stroud were busy with other commitments. Townsend explained the experimental noise track "Info Dump" is a reflection on the panicked state of mind that ensued after he stopped taking his medication.

"Love?" (2005)
"Love?" became one of the band's most well-known songs among heavy metal fans. Allmusic described its chorused harmonies as "King's X from hell".

"Love?" was chosen as the sole single from the album. Its accompanying music video, inspired by the cult horror film, The Evil Dead, was directed by Joe Lynch.< The video garnered the band wider attention, and helped "Love?" become one of their most recognizable songs. Jed Simon admitted to having produced a video for this particular song because it had "the most commercial potential". "Love?" was originally one of two confirmed songs for an EP that was supposed to contain four new songs and four covers. Although planned for release in 2003, the EP was eventually canceled.

The band embarked on a headlining tour in the United States in April and May 2005, then went on to tour in Europe. Starting at the end of June, they toured North America as part of the Sounds of the Underground tour, then joined Fear Factory on the Transgression Tour in the U.S. Throughout the tour, Fear Factory bassist Stroud performed with both bands at every concert. Strapping Young Lad concluded the year with a tour in the UK. While on tour, the band started writing the next album, then continued the work in January 2006, and finished the album by May. In the same month, Townsend announced his intention to "take a hiatus from making records for a while" after the end of touring due to exhaustion from continuous recording and producing for the past ten years.

=== The New Black (2006) ===
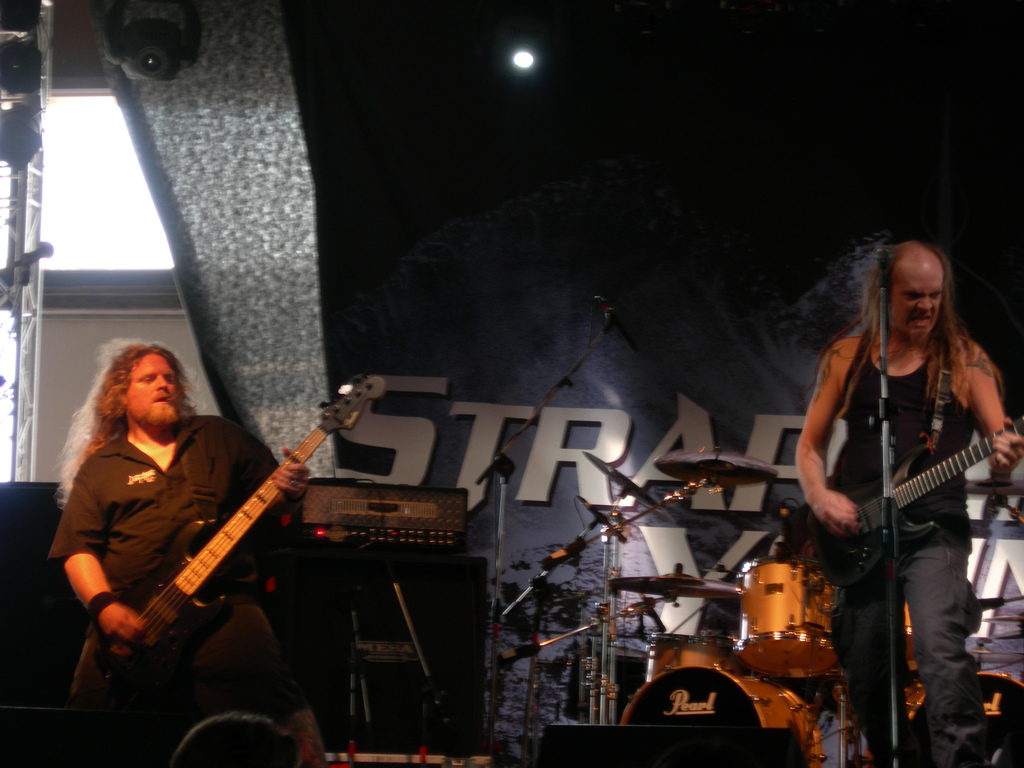
Stroud and Townsend in concert in 2006

The New Black, Strapping Young Lad's fifth and final studio album, was released on July 11, 2006. Century Media imposed a strict deadline on the release date of the album; it was to be ready before the 2006 Ozzfest. Despite this, Townsend stated the recording was not rushed, and The New Black became a critical, as well as a commercial, success. It was more melodic than any of the band's previous albums and brought back the debut album's tongue-in-cheek humor. Having sold more than 4,000 copies during its first week, The New Black reached No. 200 on the Billboard 200 chart, No. 15 on the Top Independent Albums, and No. 8 on the Top Heatseekers charts. Stylus Magazine's Cosmo Lee described it as "heavy, catchy, and with no filler", and About.com's Chad Bowar was also positive, stating that "this is a CD that's dense and heavy, but also has some memorable hooks".

A music video was shot in late May to accompany the sole single from the album, "Wrong Side".

=== Dissolution (2006) ===
Townsend recalls that after Alien, he already knew that he wouldn't want to continue SYL as a project, and that he already wished to abandon SYL after the release of City, considering the project's purpose fulfilled. In an interview conducted by Terrorizer in August 2006, Townsend explained why he decided to put the band on hold:

At the end of the day, man, I'm just tired, and old, and bald, and fat, and grouchy, and bored. You know? So I was just like, I'm going to make this record, and do this stupid Ozzfest thing, and tell a bunch of stupid jokes in front of a lot of people at Download, then I'm just going to fuck off for a while. The bigger this gets, the less I care, to the point where I just need to go spend some time with my family. I don't wanna bastardise Strapping and all these other projects by doing it for the money. Strapping was about the big middle finger, and it still is, but I don't think it needs to go any further than this.

Although Hoglan initially denied the definitive break-up of the band, saying they would go on tour in March 2007, he later stated Strapping Young Lad is on "extended hiatus", and might never reunite again. In May 2007, during a press conference held to promote his new solo album, Ziltoid the Omniscient, Townsend announced his plans to retreat from public view, including giving interviews and touring, to concentrate on his family, and producing solo albums, as well as other people's music. As a result, Strapping Young Lad were effectively disbanded. Townsend discussed his future projects in a May 2007 Metal Hammer interview, where he stated "there may be some stuff I do in the future that is as brutal and heavy as Strapping, it's just not going to be Strapping". At the time, Townsend's decision to dissolve the band caused a rift between himself and the remainder of the band, who considered SYL to be at the peak of their popularity and potential at the time; according to Simon, the rest of the band remained estranged from Townsend as a result for a time.

=== Re-releases and occasional performances ===
The remastered 10th anniversary edition of City was released on June 7, 2007, in similar vein to the 2006 remaster of Heavy as a Really Heavy Thing, with bonus tracks and extended liner notes by Townsend. A career spanning best of album, entitled 1994–2006 Chaos Years, was released on March 31, 2008, with a bonus DVD of live performances and all of the band's music videos.

During his career-retrospective concert The Retinal Circus in October 2012, Townsend introduced Jed Simon on stage and performed two SYL songs, "Love?" and "Detox". Townsend has since stated that this was a one-off performance and that he is not interested in getting SYL back together or playing songs at future shows. He posted to Twitter that he no longer feels the same connection to SYL's music and that this performance was closure for him and Strapping. In an interview on the Metal Hammer podcast, Townsend said that while he still connects to the music, SYL required him to go to extremes that took a toll on him. On his own website, he reiterates that SYL was a project that he eventually perceived to be harmful to his mental and physical health. In 2013, he played "Love?" at concerts in Mexico and Chile as a "cover song", but later expressed regretting the decision saying it "confuses people".

Townsend would occasionally perform an acoustic version of "Love?" during his "An Evening with Devin Townsend" shows through the UK in 2015 and 2019. In 2016, on tour with the Devin Townsend project, he would sometimes play a humorous acoustic version of "Detox". In 2019 he announced that during his touring cycle for Empath, he would also perform SYL songs, saying that "It's a big part of what I do and it's a big part of who I am, and I think I've denied that for a certain amount of time."

Townsend played several SYL songs during the 70,000 Tons of Metal festival, including "Aftermath", "Love?", "Detox", "All Hail the New Flesh" and a live debut of "Almost Again" from the 2006 album, The New Black.

== Musical style, influences and lyrical themes ==
Strapping Young Lad is known for their industrial thrash metal sound while also blending it with elements of death metal, black metal, groove metal, and noise. Rock Hard described them as "somewhere between death, thrash and industrial metal". Many of the band's songs showcased Townsend's versatile vocal style, often changing from screaming and growling to clean vocals or even falsetto within the course of a single song. According to Townsend, the band functioned as his "outlet to freak out", and his two main projects, the more melodic The Devin Townsend Band and the aggressive Strapping Young Lad were "supposed to be the positive and the negative". To achieve a chaotic and cacophonic sound the band utilized complex time signatures, polyrhythmic composition, blast beats, sampling, keyboard effects and intricately layered production. Townsend used the newest technology available, such as Pro Tools, Steinberg Cubase and Logic Pro, when recording, mixing and producing the band's songs. As a self-proclaimed "fan of multitracking", he created an atmospheric, layered "wall of sound", which became a hallmark of the band's production style (with the exception of their self-titled album which featured no samples, or vocal layering). Townsend's musical ideas and production style have drawn comparisons to Phil Spector and Frank Zappa. Strapping Young Lad mostly eschewed guitar solos until The New Black, which featured a more heightened emphasis on melody than their previous albums.

=== Influences ===
Strapping Young Lad drew influence from a wide range of music genres, most prominently, but not exclusively, heavy metal. Townsend cited, amongst others, Judas Priest, Jane's Addiction, Zoviet France, Grotus, and Frank Zappa as his influences, and also expressed his admiration for Meshuggah on several occasions, calling them "the best metal band on the planet". Simon and Stroud listed classic hard rock bands like AC/DC, Led Zeppelin and Kiss, and old school thrash and death metal bands like Exodus, Slayer and Morbid Angel among their influences, while Hoglan's influences range wildly in style from Stevie Wonder to progressive rock drummers like Neil Peart, Terry Bozzio and Nick Mason. Townsend stated his main influences for Heavy as a Really Heavy Thing were Napalm Death and Fear Factory, City was influenced by bands such as Foetus and White Noise, and The New Black's influences were Meshuggah, and "more traditional metal" like Metallica.

=== Lyrical themes ===
"Far Beyond Metal" (2006)
"Far Beyond Metal" from The New Black is a parody of traditional heavy metal. The song had been in the band's live repertoire since 1997, with lyrics changing practically every performance.

Townsend was the band's primary songwriter. While the first two albums were solely his work, subsequent albums featured a minority of "riffs, lyrical ideas, and song titles" by his bandmates.

Despite the brutality of Strapping Young Lad's music, their songs contain hints of tongue-in-cheek humor and self-parody. Frequently, Townsend's lyrics approached serious personal or political issues with a morbid sense of humor. He has likened the band's sense of silliness to that of "Weird Al" Yankovic. Townsend's lyrical influences covered a wide range of themes, including warfare, mathematical theorems, and movies. He also used the technique of cross-referencing, repeating lines from his own works such as older Strapping Young Lad and solo material.

== Live performances ==
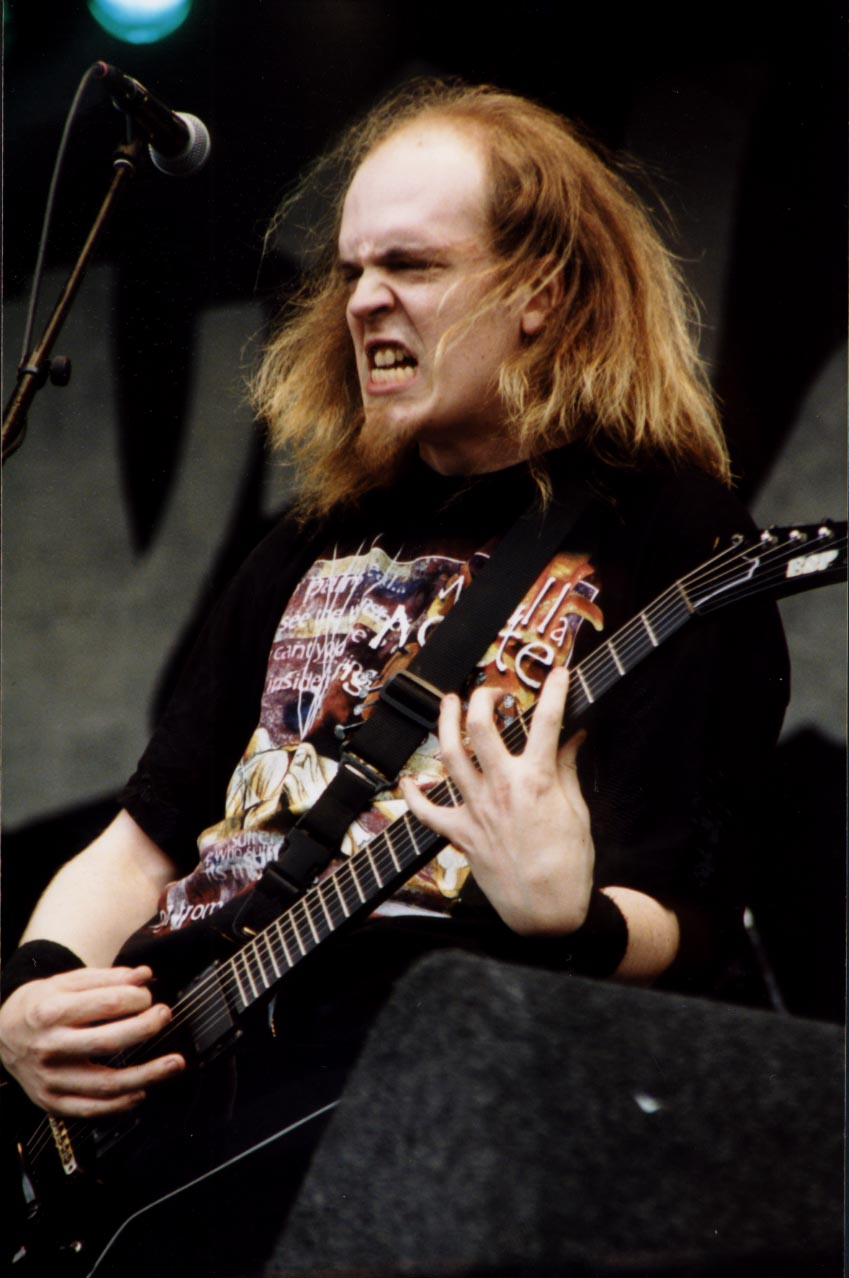
Townsend's unique "Skullet" hairstyle and aggressive stage persona have made him "one of the more memorable faces" in the metal community.

Strapping Young Lad was known for its energetic live performances, mostly owing to the eccentric appearance and persona of Devin Townsend. Adrian Begrand of PopMatters wrote "Nobody in metal today has the same kind of commanding stage presence as the self-professed Bald Bastard, Devin Townsend", and called Strapping Young Lad "one of the best live bands around". Townsend was famous for his on-stage antics; he integrated his ironic and tongue-in-cheek humor into live shows and interacted heavily with the audience. He would deliver comical, and often insulting remarks to them, organize circle pits, and parody heavy metal clichés as well as the genre itself.

The band's humorous approach was also evidenced by a song frequently performed live from 1997, entitled "Far Beyond Metal", a parody of classic heavy metal. It became a live staple and a fan favorite, with lyrics changing practically every performance. Although it was recorded live on No Sleep 'till Bedtime, and on the For Those Aboot to Rock DVD, a studio version was not recorded until 2006 during The New Black sessions. The band was also sarcastic about their own Canadian heritage, they used "Blame Canada", a comedic anti-Canada song from South Park: Bigger, Longer & Uncut as intro music at many concerts in 2003 and 2004.

For a period of time, Strapping Young Lad also played Townsend's solo material live. In 1998, after the release of Infinity, they began performing both Strapping Young Lad and Townsend's solo songs, as two separate sets. It was not until the 2003 release of Accelerated Evolution that Townsend formed a separate band, called The Devin Townsend Band, to act as his full-fledged solo band.

== Discography ==
Studio albums

- Heavy as a Really Heavy Thing (1995)
- City (1997)
- Strapping Young Lad (2003)
- Alien (2005)
- The New Black (2006)

Live album

- No Sleep 'till Bedtime (1998)

== Members ==
=== Final ===
- Devin Townsend – guitars, lead vocals, keyboards (1994–2007)
- Jed Simon – guitars, backing vocals (1995–2007)
- Byron Stroud – bass, backing vocals (1996–2007)
- Gene Hoglan – drums (1996–2007)

=== Former ===
- Adrian White – drums (1994–1996)
- Ashley Scribner – bass (1994–1995)
- Mike Sudar – guitars (1994–1995)

=== Session and touring ===
- Chris Meyers – keyboards (1994)
- Greg Price – programming (1994)
- Chris Bayes – drums (1994)
- Smokin' Lord Toot – drums (1994)
- Chris Valagao Mina – guitars, backing vocals (1997–2002)
- John Morgan – keyboards (1997)
- Dave Genn – keyboards (1997)
- Matteo Caratozzolo – keyboards (1997–1998)
- Jamie Meyer – keyboards (1998–1999)
- Jason Filipchuk – keyboards (1999)
- Will Campagna – keyboards, samples, backing vocals (2002, 2004–2007)
- Munesh Sami – keyboards (2003)
- Dave Young – keyboards, vocals (2005)
- Jon Miller – bass (2005)
- James MacDonough – bass (2006)
