= Byron Stroud =

Canadian bassist

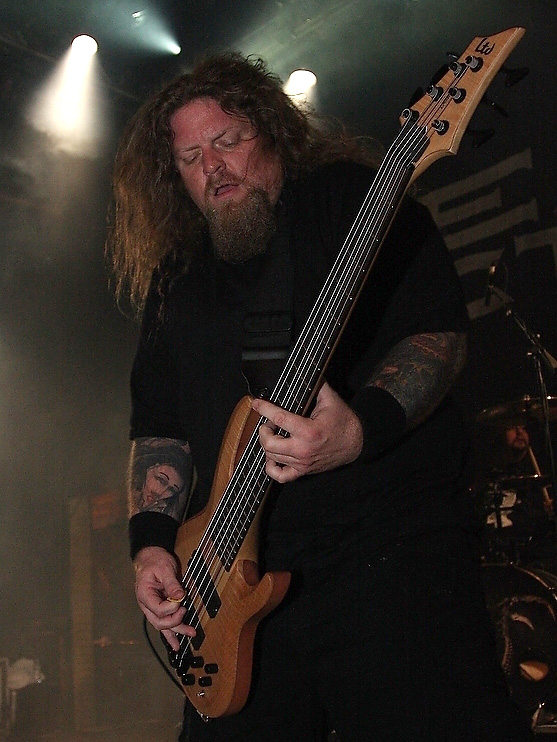
- Stroud with Fear Factory in 2010

Background information
- Born: February 12, 1969 (age 57); New Westminster, British Columbia, Canada
- Genres: Heavy metal, death metal, industrial metal, alternative metal
- Occupation: Musician
- Instrument: Bass guitar
- Years active: 1987–present

Byron Stroud (born February 12, 1969) is a Canadian musician. He is the former bassist for metal bands Fear Factory, Imonolith and Strapping Young Lad, current bassist for metal bands City of Fire and Zimmers Hole, and studio bassist for 3 Inches of Blood.

== Biography ==
Stroud has been involved in the Vancouver heavy music scene since the 1980s. His first serious band was Caustic Thought, who were formed in 1987, when he was only eighteen years old. The band also featured Jed Simon and Devin Townsend. Following Caustic Thought, he made his way to Front Line Assembly, joining them on the Hard Wired tour as a drum tech. Then he enrolled himself in the lineup for Strapping Young Lad.

Although he was a staple member of Strapping Young Lad at the time, he joined Fear Factory as a full-time member in 2004. He made his Fear Factory debut on their 2004 album Archetype (note: Stroud did not play on the album as all bass tracks were recorded by guitarist Christian Olde Wolbers). Stroud insisted his allegiance remained with both bands, as well as with Zimmers Hole, a somewhat comedic band he plays in with fellow Strapping Young Lad musician Jed Simon amongst others. Strapping Young Lad disbanded in 2007, allowing him to concentrate more on Fear Factory until his departure in 2012. Throughout his time in Fear Factory, he did not record on any of their albums.

Stroud was also part of Unit:187 along with John Morgan. He is a co-founding member of Zimmers Hole and he also featured on Devin Townsend's punk parody project Punky Brüster.

Stroud is also involved with Jed Simon's Tenet project.

In early 2011, 3 Inches of Blood asked Stroud to become their new manager. In January 2012, he joined them as their new bassist. In February 2012, Stroud left Fear Factory and was replaced by former Chimaira rhythm guitarist Matt DeVries.

== Bands ==
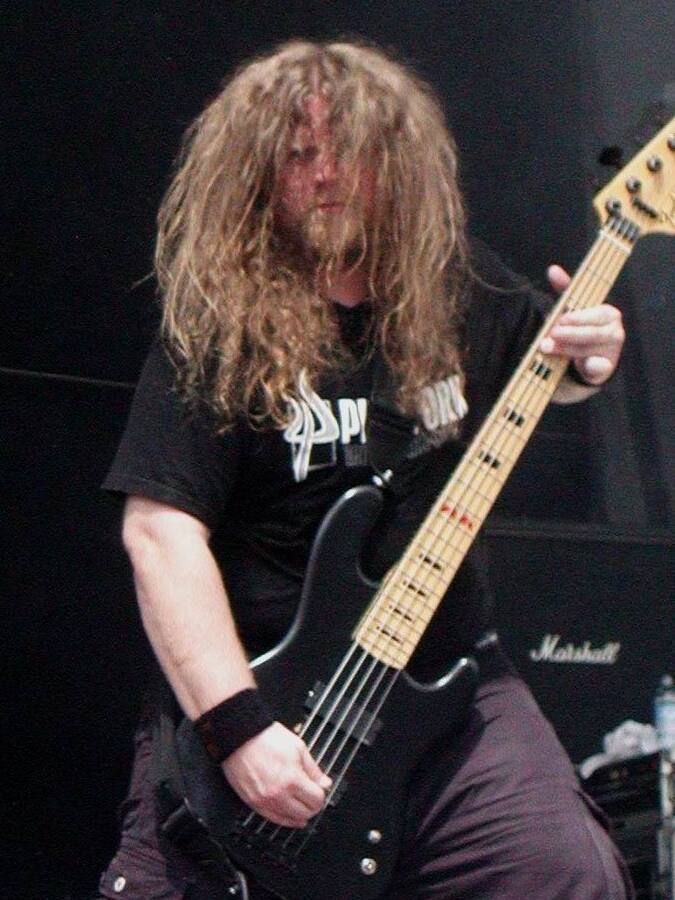
Stroud during a Strapping Young Lad show in 2005

=== Previous bands ===
- Ani Kyd
- Caustic Thought
- City of Fire
- Devin Townsend (Physicist project)
- Fear Factory
- Front Line Assembly (Drum Tech – Hard Wired tour)
- Punky Brüster
- Strapping Young Lad
- Tenet
- Unit:187

=== Current bands ===
- Zimmers Hole
- Imonolith

== Discography ==
- 1994: Caustic Thought – Caustic Thought
- 1996: Punky Brüster – Cooked on Phonics
- 2000: Devin Townsend – Physicist
- 2005: Ani Kyd – Evil Needs Candy Too

=== Fear Factory ===
- Archetype (2004) (Stroud is listed as a band member although Christian Olde Wolbers recorded the bass tracks.)
- Transgression (2005) (Listed as a band member but did not record due to Christian handling guitar and bass on the record.)
- Mechanize (2010)

=== Strapping Young Lad ===
- City (1997)
- No Sleep Till Bedtime (1998)
- Strapping Young Lad (2003)
- Alien (2005)
- The New Black (2006)

=== Unit 187 ===
- Unit 187 (1995)
- Loaded (1998)

=== Zimmers Hole ===
- Bound By Fire (1997)
- Legion of Flames (2001)
- When You Were Shouting at the Devil...We Were in League With Satan (2008)

=== Guest appearances ===
- Terror Syndrome (Terror Syndrome, 2008)

== Equipment ==
Throughout his entire career, Stroud uses Fender Custom Shop 5 String bass guitars, Fender Heartfield 5 String bass guitar, Fernandes Tremour bass guitars, ESP Horizon 5 String bass guitars, Fender Strings, DR Strings, EMG pick ups, Bill Laurence pick ups, Ampeg 1968 SVT, Ampeg SVT 2pro, Ampeg SVT 4pro, Ampeg BSP pre amp, Mesa/Boogie M-Pulse 600, Ampeg 8x10 classic speaker cabinets, Mesa/Boogie 8x10 speaker cabinets, Tech 21 Sans Amp-Bass Driver DI, Line 6 Bass Pod Pro, DigiTech effects pedals

Stroud has recently signed a deal with Ashdown Amps for equipment of the ABM range.
