= 2015 in heavy metal music =

This is a timeline documenting events of heavy metal in the year 2015.

== Bands formed ==
- Abbath
- Artificial Language
- Audiotopsy
- Bad Omens
- Baest
- Batushka
- Beast in Black
- Confessions of a Traitor
- Saint Asonia
- Scour
- Smoke Hollow
- Venom Inc.
- Wild Fire

== Bands disbanded ==
- 3 Inches of Blood
- Before the Mourning
- Conducting from the Grave
- Divine Heresy (hiatus)
- In Solitude
- Leander Rising
- Mötley Crüe
- Motörhead
- myGRAIN
- Rise to Remain
- The Safety Fire
- Sister Sin

== Bands reformed ==
- Acid Reign
- Atrophy
- Disturbed (hiatus from 2011 to 2015)
- Ex Deo (hiatus from 2014 to 2015)
- Pist.On
- See You Next Tuesday
- Underoath

== Events ==
- On March 20, 2014, Rush announced that in 2015 they would embark on a 41st anniversary tour to commemorate the release of their first album. The members of Rush have stated that this may be their last full-scale tour.
- On August 2, 2014, Savatage announced that they will reunite for 2015 Wacken Open Air.
- On January 27, L7 announced that they would perform reunion concerts at several summer festivals in 2015, including Download Festival, Hellfest, Azkena Rock Festival and Nova Rock Festival.
- On March 29, Megadeth announced that Chris Adler of Lamb of God would play drums on the band's 15th studio album.
- On March 31, Skeletonwitch announced that former Cannabis Corpse vocalist Andy Horn would be replacing Chance Garnette for their European tour. As of the announcement, Garnette was no longer listed as Skeletonwitch's vocalist.
- On April 2, Megadeth announced that Kiko Loureiro of Angra had joined the band permanently.
- On April 6, Johnny Solinger left Skid Row to pursue a solo career. He was replaced by former TNT singer Tony Harnell.
- On April 7, nearly four weeks after the death of drummer A. J. Pero, Twisted Sister announced that they would embark on their final tour together in 2016, dubbed "Forty and Fuck It", and then split up. Mike Portnoy (of Adrenaline Mob and The Winery Dogs, and formerly of Dream Theater) will be filling in for Pero on the tour.
- On April 12, Accept announced that ex-Grave Digger guitarist Uwe Lulis, and drummer Christopher Williams, had joined the band.
- On April 17, Whitesnake announced Michele Luppi of Secret Sphere as their new keyboardist.
- On April 30, Metal Church announced their reunion with Mike Howe, who was the band's lead singer from 1988 to 1994.
- On May 5, Acid Reign announced that they were reforming after breaking up in 1991.
- On May 30, Athera announced that he had left Susperia for personal reasons.
- On June 15, Morbid Angel announced that they had parted ways with their drummer Tim Yeung and lead vocalist and bassist David Vincent, and reunited with Steve Tucker, who was Vincent's replacement from 1996–2001 and 2003–2004. Later that day, however, Vincent denied that he had left the band. A few days later, Vincent and guitarist Destructhor announced their departures from Morbid Angel.
- On June 23, Disturbed announced their reunion after going on hiatus in October 2011.
- On September 10, drummer Sean Reinert announced that Cynic had split up for the second time, due to "artistic and personal differences." Later that day, however, guitarist and vocalist Paul Masvidal said that the band has not broken up, and will continue "will continue one way or another."
- On September 14, Onslaught announced that they had parted ways with longtime guitarist Andy Rosser Davies, and replaced him with Iain GT Davies.
- On October 30, at least 27 people died and about 180 were injured after a fire broke out during the concert of Romanian band Goodbye to Gravity. The fire resulted in the deaths of the band's drummer, bassist and two guitarists, leaving the singer as the sole survivor.
- On October 31, Gamma Ray announced that vocalist Frank Beck had joined the group to share vocal duties with Kai Hansen.
- On November 7, drummer Daniel Svensson announced his departure from In Flames in order to spend more time with his family.
- On November 13, Volbeat announced that they had parted ways with longtime bassist Anders Kjølholm.
- On November 19, The Ghost Inside were involved in a crash when their tour bus collided head on with a tractor trailer. Both drivers died in the collision while the remaining 10 passengers survived. Jonathan Vigil, Zach Johnson, Andrew Tkaczyk and two others were hospitalized in critical condition.
- On December 29, it was announced that Tony Harnell had parted ways with Skid Row.

== Deaths ==
- January 1 – Tommi Kuri, co-founding member of Amberian Dawn and bassist on the first three albums, died from the health issues that had forced him to leave the band in 2011.
- January 3 – Rudy "White Shark" Vercruysse, guitarist of Ostrogoth, died from liver cancer at the age of 59.
- March 1 – Ryan Stanek, co-founding member and former drummer of Broken Hope, died from undisclosed reasons at the age of 42.
- March 20 – A. J. Pero, drummer of Twisted Sister and Adrenaline Mob, died from a heart attack at the age of 55 in the bus while on tour with Adrenaline Mob.
- March 24 – Scott Clendenin, former Death and Control Denied bassist, died at the age of 47, after suffering from health complications.
- April 30 – Shawn Chavez, former guitarist of Havok, died from undisclosed reasons at the age of 30.
- May 5 – Craig Gruber, bassist of Elf and Rainbow, died from prostate cancer at the age of 63.
- May 15 – Terry Jones, vocalist of Pagan Altar, died from cancer at the age of 69.
- May 18 – Ryan Shutler, drummer of Lazarus A.D., died from a heart attack at the age of 28.
- June 4 – Allan Fryer, vocalist of Heaven, died from cancer.
- June 7 – Christopher Lee, actor and singer, died from complications of respiratory disease and heart failure at the age of 93.
- July 13 – Eric Wrixon, founding member and former keyboardist of Thin Lizzy, died from undisclosed reasons at the age of 68.
- July 21 – Justin Lowe, guitarist of After the Burial, died after falling off a bridge in Minnesota at the age of 32.
- September 14 – Martin "Kiddie" Kearns, drummer of Bolt Thrower, died unexpectedly at the age of 38.
- October 18 – Frank "Bøddel" Watkins, bassist of Gorgoroth and former bassist of Obituary, died from cancer at the age of 47.
- October 30 – Mihai Alexandru and Vlad Țelea, guitarists of Goodbye to Gravity, died in a fire which occurred at the Club Colectiv venue.
- November 8 – Bogdan Enache, drummer of Goodbye to Gravity, died after suffering a cardiac arrest from injuries sustained in the Club Colectiv fire
- November 11 – Alex Pascu, bassist of Goodbye to Gravity, died from injuries sustained in the Club Colectiv fire.
- November 11 – Philip John "Philthy Animal" Taylor, former drummer of Motörhead, including during the band's classic line-up era, died at the age of 61 from liver failure.
- December 5 – John Garner, vocalist and drummer of Sir Lord Baltimore, died from liver failure at the age of 63.
- December 5 – William John "Billy Diamond" Steiger, founding member and first guitarist of Twisted Sister, died from undisclosed reasons at the age of 67.
- December 15 – Terry Horbury, bassist of Vardis, died from cancer at the age of 65.
- December 28 – Ian Fraser "Lemmy" Kilmister, founder, lead singer, bassist and primary songwriter of Motörhead, died from cancer at the age of 70.

== Albums released ==
=== January ===
| Day | Artist | Album |
|---|---|---|
| 9 | Battle Beast | Unholy Savior |
| 9 | Callejon | Wir sind Angst |
| 12 | The Crown | Death Is Not Dead |
| 12 | Sylosis | Dormant Heart |
| 12 | Wednesday 13 | Monsters of the Universe: Come Out and Plague |
| 14 | Dr. Sin | Intactus |
| 14 | Night Demon | Curse of the Damned |
| 16 | Angra | Secret Garden |
| 16 | Orden Ogan | Ravenhead |
| 19 | Angelus Apatrida | Hidden Evolution |
| 19 | Marduk | Frontschwein |
| 19 | Marilyn Manson | The Pale Emperor |
| 23 | Finsterforst | Mach dich frei |
| 23 | Ostrogoth | Last Tribe Standing |
| 23 | Stormwitch | Season of the Witch |
| 25 | Hate | Crusade:Zero |
| 26 | Armageddon | Captivity & Devourment |
| 26 | Napalm Death | Apex Predator – Easy Meat |
| 26 | U.D.O. | Decadent |
| 27 | The Body and Thou | You, Whom I Have Always Hated |
| 27 | Papa Roach | F.E.A.R. |
| 27 | Periphery | Juggernaut: Alpha; Juggernaut: Omega |
| 27 | Venom | From the Very Depths |
| 30 | Blind Guardian | Beyond the Red Mirror |

=== February ===
| Day | Artist | Album |
|---|---|---|
| 2 | Solefald | World Metal: Kosmopolis Sud |
| 9 | Adrenaline Mob | Dearly Departed |
| 10 | Melechesh | Enki |
| 16 | Keep of Kalessin | Epistemology |
| 17 | 36 Crazyfists | Time and Trauma |
| 20 | Black Star Riders | The Killer Instinct |
| 20 | Svartsot | Vældet |
| 23 | The Agonist | Eye of Providence |
| 23 | Carach Angren | This Is No Fairytale |
| 23 | Ensiferum | One Man Army |
| 23 | Scorpions | Return to Forever |
| 24 | All That Remains | The Order of Things |
| 24 | Red | Of Beauty and Rage |
| 27 | Enforcer | From Beyond |

=== March ===
| Day | Artist | Album |
|---|---|---|
| 3 | Leviathan | Scar Sighted |
| 4 | Viking | No Child Left Behind |
| 6 | Enslaved | In Times |
| 6 | Europe | War of Kings |
| 9 | Mortification | Realm of the Skelataur |
| 10 | Cancer Bats | Searching for Zero |
| 17 | Moonspell | Extinct |
| 23 | The Gentle Storm | The Diary |
| 23 | Michael Schenker's Temple of Rock | Spirit on a Mission |
| 23 | Oceano | Ascendants |
| 23 | While She Sleeps | Brainwashed |
| 27 | Loch Vostok | From These Waters |
| 27 | Nightwish | Endless Forms Most Beautiful |
| 30 | Morgoth | Ungod |
| 30 | Prong | Songs from the Black Hole (covers album) |
| 31 | Three Days Grace | Human |

=== April ===
| Day | Artist | Album |
|---|---|---|
| 3 | Halestorm | Into the Wild Life |
| 6 | Skyforger | Senprūsija |
| 7 | Heidevolk | Velua |
| 10 | Ghost Bath | Moonlover |
| 14 | Bosse-de-Nage | All Fours |
| 17 | Apocalyptica | Shadowmaker |
| 17 | Impellitteri | Venom |
| 17 | Kiske/Somerville | City of Heroes |
| 18 | Stone Sour | Meanwhile in Burbank... (EP) |
| 20 | Drudkh | A Furrow Cut Short |
| 20 | Shining | IX / Everyone, Everything, Everywhere, Ends |
| 21 | Bill Ward | Accountable Beasts |
| 21 | Tribulation | The Children of the Night |
| 24 | Nightrage | The Puritan |
| 24 | Unleashed | Dawn of the Nine |
| 27 | Raven | ExtermiNation |

=== May ===
| Day | Artist | Album |
|---|---|---|
| 5 | Korpiklaani | Noita |
| 5 | Six Feet Under | Crypt of the Devil |
| 8 | Arcturus | Arcturian |
| 8 | Kamelot | Haven |
| 8 | Sirenia | The Seventh Life Path |
| 12 | Veil of Maya | Matriarch |
| 15 | Cain's Offering | Stormcrow |
| 15 | Whitesnake | The Purple Album |
| 19 | Coal Chamber | Rivals |
| 19 | Faith No More | Sol Invictus |
| 22 | Pyramaze | Disciples of the Sun |
| 25 | Leprous | The Congregation |
| 26 | Obsequiae | Aria of Vernal Tombs |
| 29 | Helloween | My God-Given Right |

=== June ===
| Day | Artist | Album |
|---|---|---|
| 1 | The Darkness | Last of Our Kind |
| 1 | Nuclear Assault | Pounder |
| 2 | Armored Saint | Win Hands Down |
| 2 | Nekrogoblikon | Heavy Meta |
| 2 | Paradise Lost | The Plague Within |
| 2 | Skinless | Only the Ruthless Remain |
| 8 | Gorgoroth | Instinctus Bestialis |
| 9 | Disarmonia Mundi | Cold Inferno |
| 9 | Lorna Shore | Psalms |
| 9 | Tremonti | Cauterize |
| 12 | Edenwar | Edenwar |
| 15 | Shape Of Despair | Monotony Fields |
| 16 | Iwrestledabearonce | Hail Mary |
| 19 | Luca Turilli's Rhapsody | Prometheus, Symphonia Ignis Divinus |
| 19 | Virgin Steele | Nocturnes of Hellfire & Damnation |
| 23 | Breaking Benjamin | Dark Before Dawn |
| 23 | High on Fire | Luminiferous |
| 29 | Thy Art Is Murder | Holy War |
| 30 | August Burns Red | Found in Far Away Places |
| 30 | Jungle Rot | Order Shall Prevail |

=== July ===
| Day | Artist | Album |
|---|---|---|
| 7 | Between the Buried and Me | Coma Ecliptic |
| 10 | Cradle of Filth | Hammer of the Witches |
| 17 | Orchid | Sign of the Witch (EP) |
| 17 | Powerwolf | Blessed & Possessed |
| 24 | Joe Satriani | Shockwave Supernova |
| 24 | Lamb of God | VII: Sturm und Drang |
| 24 | Northlane | Node |
| 24 | Symphony X | Underworld |
| 24 | We Came as Romans | We Came as Romans |
| 31 | Kataklysm | Of Ghosts and Gods |
| 31 | Saint Asonia | Saint Asonia |
| 31 | Xandria | Fire & Ashes (EP) |

=== August ===
| Day | Artist | Album |
|---|---|---|
| 7 | Black Fast | Terms of Surrender |
| 7 | Cattle Decapitation | The Anthropocene Extinction |
| 7 | Fear Factory | Genexus |
| 7 | Krisiun | Forged in Fury |
| 7 | Miss May I | Deathless |
| 14 | Bullet for My Valentine | Venom |
| 14 | Soulfly | Archangel |
| 21 | Act of Defiance | Birth and the Burial |
| 21 | Battlecross | Rise to Power |
| 21 | Before the Mourning | Etherial End |
| 21 | Butcher Babies | Take It Like a Man |
| 21 | The Devil Wears Prada | Space (EP) |
| 21 | Disturbed | Immortalized |
| 21 | Ghost | Meliora |
| 21 | Hate Eternal | Infernus |
| 21 | The Murder of My Sweet | Beth Out of Hell |
| 21 | P.O.D. | The Awakening |
| 21 | Praying Mantis | Legacy |
| 21 | Rotting Christ | Lucifer Over Athens (live album) |
| 21 | Royal Hunt | Devil's Dozen |
| 21 | The Sword | High Country |
| 28 | Ahab | The Boats of the "Glen Carrig" |
| 28 | Kobra and the Lotus | Words of the Prophets (EP) |
| 28 | Motörhead | Bad Magic |
| 28 | Nile | What Should Not Be Unearthed |
| 28 | Pentagram | Curious Volume |
| 28 | Soilwork | The Ride Majestic |

=== September ===
| Day | Artist | Album |
|---|---|---|
| 4 | Amorphis | Under the Red Cloud |
| 4 | Black Majesty | Cross of Thorns |
| 4 | Five Finger Death Punch | Got Your Six |
| 4 | Iron Maiden | The Book of Souls |
| 4 | Mgła | Exercises in Futility |
| 4 | Nechochwen | Heart of Akamon |
| 4 | Once Human | The Life I Remember |
| 4 | Riverside | Love, Fear and the Time Machine |
| 4 | Uncle Acid and the Deadbeats | The Night Creeper |
| 11 | Bring Me the Horizon | That's the Spirit |
| 11 | Leaves' Eyes | King of Kings |
| 11 | Slayer | Repentless |
| 11 | Stratovarius | Eternal |
| 18 | Annihilator | Suicide Society |
| 18 | Atreyu | Long Live |
| 18 | The Black Dahlia Murder | Abysmal |
| 18 | Blessthefall | To Those Left Behind |
| 18 | Christian Mistress | To Your Death |
| 18 | Malevolent Creation | Dead Man's Path |
| 18 | My Dying Bride | Feel the Misery |
| 18 | Operation: Mindcrime | The Key |
| 18 | Seven Witches | The Way of the Wicked |
| 18 | Tank | Valley of Tears |
| 18 | Tesseract | Polaris |
| 25 | A Sound of Thunder | Tales from the Deadside |
| 25 | Gloryhammer | Space 1992: Rise of the Chaos Wizards |
| 25 | Huntress | Static |
| 25 | Parkway Drive | Ire |
| | Sebastien | Dark Chambers Of Deja Vu |

=== October ===
| Day | Artist | Album |
|---|---|---|
| 2 | Children of Bodom | I Worship Chaos |
| 2 | Deafheaven | New Bermuda |
| 2 | Fit for an Autopsy | Absolute Hope Absolute Hell |
| 2 | Kylesa | Exhausting Fire |
| 2 | Queensrÿche | Condition Hüman |
| 2 | Satan | Atom by Atom |
| 2 | Sevendust | Kill the Flaw |
| 2 | Trivium | Silence in the Snow |
| 2 | W.A.S.P. | Golgotha |
| 9 | Bloodred Hourglass | Where the Oceans Burn |
| 9 | NonExist | Throne of Scars |
| 16 | 40 Below Summer | Transmission Infrared |
| 16 | Black Tide | Chasing Shadows |
| 16 | Circle II Circle | Reign of Darkness |
| 16 | Gorod | A Maze of Recycled Creeds |
| 16 | Grave | Out of Respect for the Dead |
| 16 | Sadist | Hyaena |
| 16 | Saxon | Battering Ram |
| 21 | Coldrain | Vena |
| 23 | Amberian Dawn | Innuendo |
| 23 | Born of Osiris | Soul Sphere |
| 23 | Stryper | Fallen |
| 23 | Vehemence | Forward Without Motion |
| 30 | Cryptopsy | The Book of Suffering – Tome 1 (EP) |
| 30 | Def Leppard | Def Leppard |
| 30 | Draconian | Sovran |
| 30 | Erimha | Thesis ov Warfare |
| 30 | Gama Bomb | Untouchable Glory |
| 30 | Goodbye to Gravity | Mantras of War |
| 30 | Lost Soul | Atlantis: The New Beginning |
| 30 | Myka Relocate | The Young Souls |
| 30 | Ram | Svbversvm |
| Unknown date | Black Pantera | Project Black Pantera |

=== November ===
| Day | Artist | Album |
|---|---|---|
| 6 | Chastain | We Bleed Metal |
| 6 | Dark Moor | Project X |
| 6 | Devil You Know | They Bleed Red |
| 6 | Transport League | Napalm Bats & Suicide Dogs |
| 6 | Vanden Plas | Chronicles of the Immortals: Netherworld II |
| 13 | Girlschool | Guilty as Sin |
| 13 | Intronaut | The Direction of Last Things |
| 13 | Swallow the Sun | Songs from the North I, II & III |
| 13 | Vision of Disorder | Razed to the Ground |
| 13 | Wargrave | Suffering the Void |
| 20 | Hatesphere | New Hell |
| 20 | Imperia | Tears of Silence |
| 20 | Månegarm | Månegarm |
| 20 | Solution .45 | Nightmares in the Waking State: Part I |
| 27 | Autopsy | Skull Grinder (EP) |
| 27 | Danzig | Skeletons (covers album) |
| 27 | Stone Sour | Straight Outta Burbank... (EP) |

=== December ===
| Day | Artist | Album |
|---|---|---|
| 4 | Coronatus | Raben im Herz |
| 4 | Sunn O))) | Kannon |
| 10 | Bruno Sutter | Bruno Sutter |
| 11 | Triddana | The Power & the Will |
| 18 | Baroness | Purple |

| Preceded by 2014 | Heavy Metal Timeline; 2015 | Succeeded by 2016 |
