= Metal Storm (webzine) =

Heavy metal website based in Estonia

- Website type: Music webzine, database, reviews, community
- Owner: Ivan Suslin
- Creator: Ivan Suslin
- Website: metalstorm.net
- Commercial: No
- Registration: Optional
- Launched: October 2000; 25 years ago
- Current status: Active

Metal Storm (also known as MetalStorm.net, MetalStorm.ee, MetalStorm.eu or just MS) is a webzine specializing in various forms of heavy metal music. It is based in Tallinn, Estonia, but caters to an international audience, symbolically recognized by the acquisition of an EU domain in 2008. The site features a database of over 5,000 bands, alongside album reviews, news and interviews.

== Community ==
=== Members ===
Metal Storm users can register for free and create a custom profile based on their specific preferences. The comprehensive profile format allows for users to display detailed information about their musical taste, activity on the site, and other miscellaneous information, including up to three photos. "Community Points" are awarded to users for contributing forum reports, band info, lyrics, news, events, reviews, and articles, with the number awarded depending on the value of the contribution. Users may also add albums to their "Collection," an interactive list of albums acquired, of which statistics can be graphically visualized in the form of pie charts broken down by style and country. These lists, along with the favorite bands and ratings categories, are analyzed to compare users and match those with similar musical tastes in the "Neighbours" area of the Collection tab.

=== Forum ===
Metal Storm has a forum available to all registered members. The forum is divided into many categories, including sections for discussing specific metal styles, non-metal music, general discussion and community-related topics. All comments for publications on the site are also incorporated into the forum for the purpose of convenience. The forums are moderated for spam and illegal content such as pornography and copyright infringement but are otherwise uncensored. This has caused issues with a number of posters including at least one staff member engaging in both racist and misogynistic comments, including Islamophobia.

=== Tradelist ===
In each member's Collection section, they have the option of making the album part of their regular collection, their wishlist or part of their tradelist. Members can then browse other member's tradelists and privately negotiate the trade of albums. Metal Storm states that the trading of albums is to be done at the member's own risk and that the site won't be responsible for any outcomes.

== Bands database ==
Metal Storm features a database of over 5,000 bands, with each band having a detailed profile including such information as a biography, discography, lineup, genre categorization, photo, logo and more. It operates akin to a wiki, where registered members can contribute to it. Before being published, community edits are moderated by members of the staff. Metaldata: A Bibliography of Heavy Metal Resources (2021) has praised the website's search filters, which can be refined by nationality and style, stating that it "provides a good introduction to metal's many subgenres."

=== Genre categorization ===
Heavy metal is divided into three broad sub-categories on Metal Storm. Bands that fall in between two sub-categories are usually allocated based on what elements are historically more prominent in their music though there is no strict enforcement of any rules.

==== Melodic metal ====
This sub-category includes the heavy metal genres such as heavy metal, power metal, progressive metal, glam metal, doom metal, gothic metal, folk metal, speed metal and symphonic metal.

==== Extreme metal ====
This sub-category includes the heavy metal genres such as black metal, death metal, grindcore, thrash metal, and groove metal. Extreme doom metal bands are also included in this sub-category.

==== Alternative metal ====
This sub-category includes the heavy metal genres such as alternative metal, nu metal, metalcore, stoner metal, sludge metal, post-metal, rap metal, industrial metal, avant-garde metal and drone metal.

=== Accepted content ===
Metal Storm is known for its relatively relaxed attitude towards accepting bands that are not unquestionably categorized as metal. The database allows for 'invisible' profiles, which is a term used for profiles that are either incomplete or of bands that do not have enough metal elements to have them featured on the site. These profiles are still publicly accessible; however, they are not promoted as much as those of bands that are unquestionably metal. Nevertheless, Metal Storm still has visible profiles for stylistically ambiguous bands such as Slipknot, Candiria and Led Zeppelin. Moreover, there are many reviews of stylistically ambiguous bands on the site, most commonly from the genres of gothic rock, noise rock, industrial music, hard rock, progressive rock, AOR and darkwave. This attitude is rationalized as being an attempt at promoting open-mindedness amongst metal fans.

== Rating system and reviews ==
Members have the option to rate featured albums on a scale of 1–10, with the total votes from all members producing an average rating. Studio albums with over 200 votes are eligible to be included in the "Top 200 albums" list, while others that accumulate 20 votes are eligible for more specific lists including "Top 20 albums by year", "Top albums by style", and "Bottom albums" (The lowest-on-average user rated albums). Live albums and DVDs are also eligible for their respective lists after receiving 20 votes.

Metal Storm has a team of official reviewers who receive albums from labels and bands and then post official reviews of them on the front page of the website. Nevertheless, all registered users are able to submit reviews of albums, provided that they are of music that has been released for at least 3 months. If accepted by the editors, these reviews are then posted as "Guest Reviews" with an appropriate disclaimer attached to them. As such quality of reviews vary in terms of writing style, subjectivity and even standards of spelling and grammar. This is especially the case with past reviews. The number of reviews on the website has declined in recent years with much of the emphasis being on promoting staff favorite bands as opposed to providing a more broad outlook.

An event is considered a "Supported Event" by Metal Storm if the organizers allow for Press Accreditation for an official reviewer from the website. The event then receives an official review with photographs. Like album reviews, concert reviews are also accepted from users; however, such events are not considered Supported Events.
In 2008 MetalStorm became one of the official partners of the French festival Hellfest and a number of the interviews conducted by MS staff on the festival will feature on the upcoming HellFest DVD. The partnership is continued in 2009.

== Metal Storm Awards ==
Metal Storm hosts an annual award, where they appoint the album of the year for the different genres of metal. The official 10 nominees of each category are decided by the staff members and receives a brief description and if available a link to an official MetalStorm review. In additions to the official nominees, the users have the opportunity to supply "write-in" votes for bands not officially nominated. There has been some controversy in how the official nominees are chosen with staff deliberately trying to steer voting away from releases by popular bands in favour of their own preferences. This has included putting albums in incorrect categories. For example 2015 awards saw the official nomination of Tribulation's The Children of the Night album in death metal category despite the album not having any of the stylistic components associated with death metal.

There is also a special award each year called "Best drama". It's given to the band, who is considered to have provided a good drama the year in question. The drama award is generally only in sarcasm and not considered a "serious award". In 2007, the award was given to Gorgoroth for the fight over the rights to the name Gorgoroth. In 2008, the award for best drama went to "Metal Storm vs. Wikipedia," or, as the nomination reworded it, the conflict between "the staff of Metal Storm and the uberposeurs of Wikipedia." This revolved around the "drama" with the conflict about Metal Storm's Wikipedia page reaching Wikipedia's standards of notability. It was the first year that this award has been able to be voted for by Metal Storm users, with various dramas listed as nominees. In the past the Metal Storm staff have just chosen the drama award themselves.

Every year Metal Storm contacts all the bands nominated for awards in each category and a lot of bands post their nomination and award wins as news on their official websites. Regarding the 2008 awards, news of Oceans of Sadness' victory in the avant-garde metal category was printed in the Belgian/Flemish newspaper "Gazet Van Antwerpen." The online version of the newspaper also published it. The Metal Storm Awards in 2008 was the fourth year that the awards have been running.
