= Down Below (Tribulation album) =

Studio album by Tribulation
- Released: 26 January 2018
- Genre: Gothic metal; heavy metal; black 'n' roll
- Length: 46:40
- Label: Century Media Records

Tribulation chronology
The Children of The Night (2015)	Down Below (2018)	Where the Gloom Becomes Sound (2021)

Down Below is the fourth studio album by Swedish heavy metal band Tribulation. It was released 26 January 2018 via Century Media Records. The band released a video for the song “The Lament”.

== Musical style ==
According to Loudwire, the album "showcases how adept Tribulation are at tempering moods and incorporating different influences (goth rock, traditional metal, death metal, black metal) to craft something entirely unique in a metallic world obsessed with aimless genre-mashing. What helps propel their ethereal sound even in their heaviest moments (such as the earth-cracking Subterannea, Lacrimosa) is the interplay of guitarists Adam Zaars and Jonathan Hultén. When the rhythm riffing sustains, the melodies interject, leaving Tribulation with the ability to dip back into their early roots without ever losing sight on the present."

== Reception ==
Professional ratings
Aggregate scores
Source	Rating
Metacritic	83/100
Review scores
Source	Rating
Metal Storm	8.5/10
Pitchfork	8/10
Metal Injection	10/10
Sputnikmusic	4.0/5
Exclaim!	8.0/10
Metal Hammer	3.5/5

=== Accolades ===
Publication	Accolade	Rank	Ref.
Consequence of Sound	Top 25 Hard Rock/Metal Albums of 2018	15	
Decibel	Decibel's Top 40 Albums of 2018	2	
Loudwire	Top 30 Metal Albums of 2018	9	
PopMatters	Top 20 Metal Albums of 2018	14	

== Track listing ==
1. "The Lament" - 5:39
2. "Nightbound" - 5:29
3. "Lady Death" - 3:24
4. "Subterranea" - 5:24
5. "Purgatorio" - 3:40
6. "Cries from the Underworld" - 5:11
7. "Lacrimosa" - 6:31
8. "The World" - 3:55
9. "Here Be Dragons" - 7:27
10. "Come, Become, to Be" (bonus track) - 3:41

== Personnel ==
- Johannes Andersson – bass, vocals
- Jonathan Hultén – lead guitar
- Adam Zaars – rhythm guitar
- Oscar Leander – drums

== Charts ==
Chart	Peak position
Austrian Albums (Ö3 Austria)	59
Belgian Albums (Ultratop Flanders)	137
Finnish Albums (Suomen virallinen lista)	45
German Albums (Offizielle Top 100)	33
Swedish Albums (Sverigetopplistan)	16
UK Rock & Metal Albums (OCC)	33
US Heatseekers Albums (Billboard)	4
US Top Tastemaker Albums (Billboard)	9
