= City (Strapping Young Lad album) =

Studio album by Strapping Young Lad
- Released: February 11, 1997
- Recorded: July 1996
- Studios: Red Stripe Studio, Burnaby; Mothership Studios, Los Angeles, California
- Genres: Industrial metal; thrash metal; death metal
- Length: 39:19
- Label: Century Media
- Producers: Devin Townsend, Daniel Bergstrand

Strapping Young Lad chronology
| Heavy as a Really Heavy Thing (1995) | City (1997) | No Sleep 'till Bedtime (1998) |

Devin Townsend chronology
| Punky Brüster – Cooked on Phonics (1996) | City (1997) | Ocean Machine: Biomech (1997) |

City is the second studio album by Canadian extreme metal band Strapping Young Lad, released on February 11, 1997. Frontman Devin Townsend assembled a permanent lineup of Strapping Young Lad to record the album, including prolific drummer Gene Hoglan, and Townsend's former bandmates Jed Simon on guitar and Byron Stroud on bass. The album was critically acclaimed, with Revolver naming it one of "the greatest metal albums of all time", and it is widely considered Strapping Young Lad's best work. The album was re-released in 2007 with several bonus tracks and altered cover art.

== Background ==
After releasing the first Strapping Young Lad album, Heavy as a Really Heavy Thing, as a solo album, Townsend recruited a permanent line-up for the second album: Jed Simon on guitar, Byron Stroud on bass and Gene Hoglan on drums.

Devin moved to the UK to work with the Wildhearts, before moving back to Vancouver to work at a restaurant. He then decided to move to Los Angeles and "move in with some mutual friends and (I) slept on their couch and wrote Ocean Machine and City." The album was written about the city of Los Angeles, as well as being majorly influenced by the 1980s Japanese television anime series Dirty Pair as well as Yukito Kishiro's 1990s manga series Battle Angel Alita.

City was remastered and re-released in 2007, and included several unreleased tracks, as well as a Japanese bonus track and the video for "Detox". The album was re-released in 2012, and includes a CD version of For Those Aboot to Rock: Live at the Commodore as a bonus disc. Teddy Möller (credited as "Septic Ted") from Loch Vostok appears as a guest saxophonist on the joke-track "Headrhoid".

Bonus track "Centipede" is featured on all versions of No Sleep 'till Bedtime, and samples a percussion loop from "Happiness in Slavery" by Nine Inch Nails.

== Reception ==
Professional ratings
Review scores
| Source | Rating |
|---|---|
| AllMusic | 4/5 stars |
| Chronicles of Chaos | 9/10 |
| Collector's Guide to Heavy Metal | 8/10 |
| The Encyclopedia of Popular Music | 3/5 stars |
| Metal.de | 8/10 |

City received highly positive reviews. Kerrang! praised the album for its heaviness, claiming it sounded like "sticking your head into the jet nozzle of a Stealth Bomber", while Metal Hammer ranked it No. 13 on its "Top 20 Albums of 1997" list and also included it in another list released in 2020 and containing what they considered to be the top 10 albums of that year. The album gained a cult following and a loyal fan base for the band. City is considered to be the band's best effort by a large number of fans and critics alike.

In 2000, Terrorizer listed the album as one of the "100 Most Important Albums of the Nineties"; the magazine's readers' poll also ranked it at number 30 on the 100 best albums of the decade. In 2002, the album was No. 45 on Revolver magazine's "69 Greatest Metal Albums of All Time" list, and was on their "Must Have Metal Albums" list in 2005. Townsend himself stated City "is the real Strapping record. That's the ultimate one out of all of them". City had sold over 9,000 copies in the United States by 2002. The song "Oh My Fucking God" was later covered by fellow Canadian extreme metal band Cryptopsy, for a compilation album by Century Media.

== Track listing ==
All tracks are written by Devin Townsend, except where noted.

| No. | Title | Writer(s) | Length |
|---|---|---|---|
| 1. | "Velvet Kevorkian" | | 1:17 |
| 2. | "All Hail the New Flesh" | | 5:24 |
| 3. | "Oh My Fucking God" | | 3:34 |
| 4. | "Detox" | | 5:37 |
| 5. | "Home Nucleonics" | | 2:31 |
| 6. | "AAA" | | 5:21 |
| 7. | "Underneath the Waves" | | 3:40 |
| 8. | "Room 429" (Cop Shoot Cop cover) | Tod Ashley | 5:21 |
| 9. | "Spirituality" | | 6:34 |
| Total length: | | | 39:19 |

Bonus tracks
| No. | Title | Length |
|---|---|---|
| 10. | "Centipede" (available on Japanese release and 2007 remaster) | 7:55 |
| 11. | "Home Nucleonics" ('96 demo, available on Japanese release of No Sleep 'till Bedtime and 2007 remaster) | 3:02 |
| 12. | "Headrhoid" (Gunt demo, available on Japanese release of No Sleep 'till Bedtime and 2007 remaster) | 1:38 |
| 13. | "Detox" ('96 demo, available on Japanese release of No Sleep 'till Bedtime and 2007 remaster) | 5:48 |
| 14. | "AAA" ('96 demo, available on Japanese release of No Sleep 'till Bedtime and 2007 remaster) | 5:22 |

== Personnel ==
=== Strapping Young Lad ===
- Devin Townsend – guitars, vocals
- Jed Simon – guitars
- Byron Stroud – bass
- Gene Hoglan – drums, additional drum arrangements on "Oh My Fucking God"

=== Additional musicians ===
- Chris Valagao Mina – guitars, vocals
- Tanya Evans – vocals

=== The Cruxfrog Choir ===
- Val (Chris Valagao Mina)
- Stoolie B. Flames (Byron Stroud)
- The Tower
- Pete "this beer reminds me of the beaches in Portugal" Maia

=== Additional personnel ===
- Devin Townsend – production, mix engineering, song composition, management
- Daniel Bergstrand – audio (Drums and reference tracks) engineering, final mix.
- Matteo Caratozzolo – audio (overdubs and hell) engineering, Red Stripe Studios Burnaby BC
- Danne the Manne – additional production
- Mercello Gomes – assistant engineering
- Steve Good – assistant engineering
- The Tower – second recording engineering
- Steve Good – studio coordination
- MC2 – editing
- Lulu Devine – editing
- Adrian White – additional drum arrangements on "AAA"
- Strapping Young Lad – additional arrangements
- Masa Noda – photography
- Dan Collins – photography
