= Exercises in Futility =

Exercises in Futility may refer to:

- Exercises in Futility (Marc Ribot album), 2008
- Exercises in Futility (Mgła album), 2015
