= Terror Regime =

Studio album by Jungle Rot
- Released: March 19, 2013
- Recorded: Belle City Sound Company, Racine, Wisconsin
- Genre: Death metal
- Length: 34:32
- Label: Victory
- Producer: Chris "Wisco" Djuricic & Jungle Rot

Jungle Rot chronology
Kill on Command (2011)	Terror Regime (2013)	Order Shall Prevail (2015)

Terror Regime is the eighth studio album by American death metal band Jungle Rot, released through Victory Records on March 19, 2013.

== Track listing ==
No.	Title	Length
1.	"Voice Your Disgust"	3:02
2.	"Terror Regime"	3:55
3.	"Utter Chaos"	2:50
4.	"I Am Hatred"	3:43
5.	"Blind Devotion"	3:21
6.	"Scorn"	3:54
7.	"Rage Through the Wasteland"	3:16
8.	"Ruthless Omnipotence"	3:11
9.	"I Don't Need Society (D.R.I. Cover)"	1:39
10.	"Carpet Bombing"	1:13
11.	"Pronounced Dead"	4:28
Total length:		34:32

== Personnel ==
- David Matrise: Guitar/Lead Vocals
- James Genenz: Bass Guitar/Backing Vocals
- Geoff Bub: Lead Guitar
- Jesse Beahler: Drums
- Chris "Wisco" Djuricic: Producer
- Gyula Havancsak: Artwork & Design
