= Fueled by Hate =

Album by Jungle Rot

Fueled By Hate

Studio album by Jungle Rot
- Released: June 15, 2004
- Recorded: December 2003 at Studio One, Racine, Wisconsin
- Genre: Death metal
- Length: 29:55
- Label: Olympic Recordings/Century Media
- Producer: Chris Djuricic & Jungle Rot

Jungle Rot chronology
Dead and Buried (2001)	Fueled By Hate (2004)	Warzone (2006)

Professional ratings
Review scores
Source	Rating
AllMusic	3/5 stars

Fueled by Hate is the fourth studio album by American death metal band Jungle Rot, released through Olympic Recordings on June 15, 2004.

== Track listing ==
No.	Title	Length
1.	"Intro" (Instrumental)	0:51
2.	"Face Down"	3:41
3.	"Let Them Die"	2:26
4.	"Fractured"	3:08
5.	"Gain Control"	2:09
6.	"Gasping for Air"	2:41
7.	"Low Life"	3:05
8.	"Scars of the Suffering"	1:09
9.	"Symbols of Hate"	3:00
10.	"No Surrender"	2:18
11.	"Habit Fulfilled"	2:39
12.	"More Demon Souls"	2:48
Total length:		29:55

== Personnel ==
- David Matrise: Vocals/Guitar
- Jerry Sturino: Bass Guitar
- Chris Djuricic: Guitar
- Eric House: Drums
- Chris "Wisco" Djuricic: Producer
