= No Sleep 'till Bedtime =

Live album by Strapping Young Lad
- Released: June 15, 1998
- Recorded: October 12, 1997
- Genre: Extreme metal, industrial metal
- Length: 42:32
- Label: Century Media
- Producer: Devin Townsend

Strapping Young Lad chronology
City (1997)	No Sleep 'till Bedtime (1998)	Strapping Young Lad (2003)

Devin Townsend chronology
Ocean Machine: Biomech (1997)	No Sleep 'till Bedtime (1998)	Infinity (1998)

Professional ratings
Review scores
Source	Rating
Chronicles of Chaos	9.5/10
Collector's Guide to Heavy Metal	8/10
The Encyclopedia of Popular Music	3/5 stars

No Sleep 'till Bedtime is a live album by Canadian extreme metal band Strapping Young Lad. It was recorded live in Melbourne Australia, on October 12, 1997; however, the live tracks presented here are the only ones recorded before the tape ran out. "Japan" and "Centipede" are new studio tracks that were added by the label as a bonus material. The title is a homage to and parody of Motörhead's No Sleep 'til Hammersmith live album.

"Japan" and "Centipede" are studio recordings, each a Japanese bonus track for Heavy as a Really Heavy Thing and City respectively. The latter samples a percussion loop from "Happiness in Slavery" by Nine Inch Nails.

The Japanese release of this record came in a limited edition box set. It includes four bonus tracks that are demos recorded at one of vocalist/guitarist Devin Townsend's friend's living rooms in LA, which were later added to the 2007 reissue of City.

== Track listing ==
No.	Title	Length
1.	"Velvet Kevorkian"	2:42
2.	"All Hail the New Flesh"	5:24
3.	"Home Nucleonics"	2:24
4.	"Oh My Fucking God"	3:40
5.	"S.Y.L."	4:53
6.	"In the Rainy Season"	5:29
7.	"Far Beyond Metal"	4:46
8.	"Japan"	5:17
9.	"Centipede"	7:55
10.	"Home Nucleonics" ('96 demo) (Japanese bonus track)	3:02
11.	"Hedrhoid" (Gunt demo) (Japanese bonus track)	1:38
12.	"Detox" ('96 demo) (Japanese bonus track)	5:48
13.	"AAA" ('96 demo) (Japanese bonus track)	5:22

== Personnel ==
- Devin Townsend – vocals, guitar
- Jed Simon – guitar, backing vocals
- Byron Stroud – bass, backing vocals
- John Morgan – keyboards
- Gene Hoglan – drums
