= What Horrors Await =

Studio album by Jungle Rot
- Released: May 19, 2009
- Recorded: Belle City Sound Recording, Racine, Wisconsin
- Genre: Death metal
- Length: 41:06
- Label: Napalm
- Producer: Chris "Wisco" Djuricic & Jungle Rot

Jungle Rot chronology
Warzone (2006)	What Horrors Await (2009)	Kill on Command (2011)

What Horrors Await is the sixth studio album by American death metal band Jungle Rot, released through Napalm Records on May 19, 2009. The album was re-released in April 2018 through the band's current label Victory Records, reissued with the original cover artwork and the original album remixed and remastered.

The album was rated a 6 out of 10 by Metal Temple Magazine.

== Track listing ==
No.	Title	Length
1.	"Worst Case Scenario"	4:04
2.	"The Unstoppable"	2:51
3.	"Straight Jacket Life"	3:01
4.	"State of War"	3:14
5.	"Two Faced Disgrace"	3:01
6.	"End of an Age"	2:38
7.	"Speak the Truth"	1:36
8.	"What Horrors Await"	2:46
9.	"Nerve Gas Catastrophe"	2:27
10.	"Braindead"	3:47
11.	"Atrocity"	2:43
12.	"Exit Wounds"	2:19
13.	"Invincible Force" (Destruction cover)	4:15
14.	"Black Candle Mass"	2:24
Total length:		41:06

== Personnel ==
- David Matrise: Guitar/Lead Vocal
- James Genenz: Bass Guitar/Backing Vocal
- Geoff Bub: Lead Guitar
- Eric House: Drums
- Chris "Wisco" Djuricic: Producer
- Gyula Havancsak: Art and Design
