= Punky Brüster – Cooked on Phonics =

Studio album by Devin Townsend
- Released: March 19, 1996
- Genre: Heavy metal, punk rock, pop punk, comedy rock
- Length: 58:36
- Label: Hevy Devy
- Producer: Devin Townsend

Devin Townsend chronology
Punky Brüster – Cooked on Phonics (1996)	Ocean Machine: Biomech (1997)

Devin Townsend overall chronology
Heavy as a Really Heavy Thing (1995)	Punky Brüster – Cooked on Phonics (1996)	City (1997)

Punky Brüster – Cooked on Phonics is the debut studio album by Canadian musician Devin Townsend, originally released as Cooked on Phonics under the fictional band name Punky Brüster. It was released on Townsend's label, HevyDevy Records, on March 19, 1996. It is a comedic metal/punk rock concept album written by Townsend.

Cooked on Phonics tells the story of a fictitious death metal band "from South Central Poland" called Cryptic Coroner. During a gig, their guitarist breaks a string, and the band is forced to improvise and tune up to play punk rock instead. The band accidentally becomes an overnight success, and decides to sell out their metal look and sound to become a commercial punk rock band called Punky Brüster (the band's name being a pun on the 1980s U.S. television series Punky Brewster).

At the end of the track "Larry's O," Townsend says the album took "A week-and-a-half to write, six days to record, 12 hours to mix."

== Track listing ==
All tracks are written by Devin Townsend.

No.	Title	Length
1.	"Recipe for Bait"	7:26
2.	"Fake Punk"	2:21
3.	"EZ$$"	4:13
4.	"Metal Dilemma"	3:32
5.	"Oats Peas Beans & Barley"	1:49
6.	"Wallet Chain"	3:25
7.	"Heinous Anus"	1:43
8.	"Heavy Metal Mama"	4:47
9.	"Crusty's at the Ivanhoe"	6:23
10.	"Picture of Myself"	6:43
11.	"The Girls Next Door"	4:28
12.	"Larry's O"	6:06
Total length:		55:30

Bonus track
No.	Title	Length
13.	"Metal Heads Are Punk Rockers" (cover/parody of "Sheena Is a Punk Rocker" by the Ramones)	3:06
Total length:		58:36

== Personnel ==
Each member of the project is credited under two aliases, the first as a Punky Brüster member, and the second as a Cryptic Coroner member.

- Devin Townsend:
  - Dr. Skinny – main vocals, guitar
  - Lord Stenchlor
- John Randahl Harder
  - Squid Vicious – bass, vocals
  - Jokor, King of the Orcs
- Adrian White:
  - Dances with Chickens – drums
  - Underwator

=== Additional vocalists and musicians ===
- Chris Valagao (E. Val Mescal) – vocals on Oats Peas Beans & Barley
- Jed Simon (Ace Longback) – background vocals
- Byron Stroud (Stoolie B. Flames) – vocals, textures
- Bob Wagner (Velvet Kevorkian)
- Chief Dontsmoken
- Pete of Shit
- Surrey Wagner – drums
- Diananator
- Matteo Caratozzolo – editing, vocals
