= V - The Doctrine Decoded =

V: The Doctrine Decoded

Studio album by Loch Vostok
- Released: 4 October 2012
- Genre: Progressive metal
- Length: 56:38
- Label: ViciSolum Productions

Loch Vostok chronology
Dystopium (2011)	V: The Doctrine Decoded (2012)	From These Waters (2015)

V: The Doctrine Decoded is the fifth studio album released by the Swedish progressive metal band, Loch Vostok. The album was released worldwide on 4 October 2012, which coincided with the "European Progressive Assault" tour where the band opened for Leprous, together with Persefone, and Ørkenkjøtt.

The album was recorded, engineered, produced, and mixed at Blueflame Productions in Sweden, and mastered by Lawrence Mackrory at Great Scot! Audio. It received overall good reviews.

== Track listing ==
All lyrics are written by Teddy Möller; all music is composed by Teddy Möller, except where noted.

Standard edition
No.	Title	Length
1.	"Seeker"	5:35
2.	"A Tale of Two Kings"	5:10
3.	"Syndrome of Self"	4:30
4.	"Citizen Cain"	5:50
5.	"Twilight of the Dogs"	6:04
6.	"Inflict Chaos"	4:39
7.	"Regicide" (Teddy Möller & Niklas Kupper)	3:52
8.	"Claim the Throne"	4:36
9.	"Ravenous"	4:28
10.	"Common Ground"	4:39
11.	"Beyond the Obvious"	7:15
Total length:		56:38

== Personnel ==
- Teddy Möller – vocals, guitar
- Niklas Kupper – guitar, vocals
- Fredrik Klingwall – keyboard
- Jimmy Mattsson – bass guitar
- Lawrence Dinamarca – drums
