= Warzone (Jungle Rot album) =

Studio album by Jungle Rot
- Released: June 27, 2006
- Recorded: Studio One, Racine, Wisconsin
- Genre: Death metal
- Length: 31:59
- Labels: Crash Music, Inc.
- Producers: Chris "Wisco" Djuricic & Jungle Rot

Jungle Rot chronology
Fueled by Hate (2004)	Warzone (2006)	What Horrors Await (2009)

Professional ratings
Review scores
Source	Rating
AllMusic	3.5/5 stars

Warzone is the fifth studio album by American death metal band Jungle Rot, released through Crash Music, Inc. on June 27, 2006.

== Track listing ==
No.	Title	Length
1.	"Victims of Violence"	2:43
2.	"Cut in Two"	2:09
3.	"Savage Rite"	2:52
4.	"They Gave Their Lives"	2:41
5.	"Strong Shall Survive"	3:11
6.	"Decapitated"	1:47
7.	"Ready for War"	3:47
8.	"Ambushed"	3:24
9.	"Fight for Life"	3:20
10.	"Territoriality"	2:09
11.	"Killing Spree"	3:56
Total length:		31:59

== Personnel ==
- David Matrise: Guitar/Vocals
- James Genenz: Bass Guitar/Backing Vocal
- Geoff Bub: Guitar
- Neil Zacharek: Drums
- Chris "Wisco" Djuricic: Producer
- Jeromy Boutwell: Graphic Design
