= Kill on Command =

Studio album by Jungle Rot
- Released: June 21, 2011
- Recorded: Belle City Sound Company, Racine, Wisconsin
- Genre: Death metal
- Length: 35:52
- Label: Victory
- Producer: Chris "Wisco" Djuricic & Jungle Rot

Jungle Rot chronology
What Horrors Await (2009)	Kill on Command (2011)	Terror Regime (2013)

Professional ratings
Review scores
Source	Rating
AllMusic	4/5 stars

Kill on Command is the seventh studio album by American death metal band Jungle Rot. It was released by Victory Records on June 21, 2011.

== Track listing ==
No.	Title	Length
1.	"Their Finest Hour"	5:25
2.	"Bloodties"	3:53
3.	"Rise Up & Revolt"	3:52
4.	"Kill on Command"	3:22
5.	"Demoralized"	3:15
6.	"Push Comes to Shove"	3:12
7.	"I Predict a Riot"	2:51
8.	"No Mercy (from the Merciless)"	3:23
9.	"Born of Contagion"	4:03
10.	"Life Negated"	2:36
Total length:		35:52

== Personnel ==
- David Matrise: Guitar/Lead Vocals
- James Genenz: Bass Guitar/Backing Vocals
- Geoff Bub: Lead Guitar
- Jesse Beahler: Drums
- Chris "Wisco" Djuricic: Producer
- Gyula Havancsak: Artwork and Design
