= Dystopium =

Studio album by Loch Vostok
- Released: 23 September 2011
- Genre: Progressive metal
- Length: 52:06
- Label: ViciSolum Productions

Loch Vostok chronology
| Reveal No Secrets (2009) | Dystopium (2011) | V: The Doctrine Decoded (2012) |

Dystopium is the fourth studio album released by the Swedish progressive metal band, Loch Vostok. The album was released worldwide on 23 September 2011. This album was produced by Teddy Möller, co-produced by Fredrik Klingwall and Lawrence Mackrory, recorded at Blueflame Productions, and mixed and mastered by Lawrence Mackrory at Great Scot! Audio.

Loch Vostok released a music video for the single Sacred Structure

== Track listing ==
All lyrics are written by Teddy Möller; all music is composed by Teddy Möller

Standard edition
| No. | Title | Length |
|---|---|---|
| 1. | "A Mission Undivine" | 4:12 |
| 2. | "Repeat Offender" | 3:18 |
| 3. | "World Trade Dissenter" | 4:56 |
| 4. | "Sacred Structure" | 5:08 |
| 5. | "Navigator" | 4:32 |
| 6. | "In the Wake of Humanity" | 5:04 |
| 7. | "Viral Strain" | 4:59 |
| 8. | "Disconnection" | 4:14 |
| 9. | "Taste the Flame" | 5:03 |
| 10. | "Absence" | 4:12 |
| 11. | "Dystopium" | 6:28 |
| Total length: | | 52:06 |

The iTunes version also included a bonus track called "Release".

== Personnel ==
- Teddy Möller – vocals, guitar
- Niklas Kupper – guitar, vocals
- Fredrik Klingwall – keyboard
- Jimmy Mattsson – bass guitar
- Lawrence Dinamarca – drums
