= For Those Aboot to Rock: Live at the Commodore =

Video by Strapping Young Lad
- Released: November 2, 2004
- Recorded: January 16, 2004, Commodore Ballroom, Vancouver
- Genre: Extreme metal
- Length: 70:46
- Label: Century Media
- Producer: Devin Townsend

For Those Aboot to Rock: Live at the Commodore is a live performance DVD by the Canadian heavy metal band Strapping Young Lad, released in 2004 by Century Media. A CD version was released along with the 2013 "Metal for the Masses" reissue of City to celebrate Century Media's 25th anniversary.

Exclaim! noted about it in its review, "The DVD just emphasises the fact that in order to truly appreciate the 'unstoppable force' and humour that is SYL, you need to see it live."

== Track listing ==
All tracks are written by Devin Townsend.

| No. | Title | Length |
|---|---|---|
| 1. | "Dire (Intro)" | 1:05 |
| 2. | "Consequence" | 4:26 |
| 3. | "Relentless" | 3:11 |
| 4. | "Rape Song" | 4:01 |
| 5. | "Home Nucleonics" | 2:41 |
| 6. | "S.Y.L." | 4:31 |
| 7. | "In the Rainy Season" | 5:29 |
| 8. | "Devour" | 3:13 |
| 9. | "Aftermath" | 7:11 |
| 10. | "Oh My Fucking God" | 4:38 |
| 11. | "Force Fed" | 5:42 |
| 12. | "Detox" | 9:07 |
| 13. | "Velvet Kevorkian / All Hail the New Flesh" | 8:33 |
| 14. | "Far Beyond Metal" | 6:58 |
| Total length: | | 70:46 |

=== Extra features ===
| No. | Title | Length |
|---|---|---|
| 1. | "Relentless" (music video) | 3:05 |
| 2. | "Detox" (music video) | 5:40 |
| 3. | "Interviews" |

== Credits ==
- Devin Townsend – guitar, sound effects, vocals, production, engineering
- Gene Hoglan – drums
- Jed Simon – guitar, vocals
- Byron Stroud – bass
- Munesh Sami – keyboards
- Tim Bavis – engineering
- Greg Reely – engineering
- Bryan Seely – sound effects, assistant
- Shaun Thingvold – mixing
- Marcus Rogers – director, editing
- Phil Hinkle – A&R
