= Commodore Ballroom =

Nightclub and music venue in Vancouver, Canada

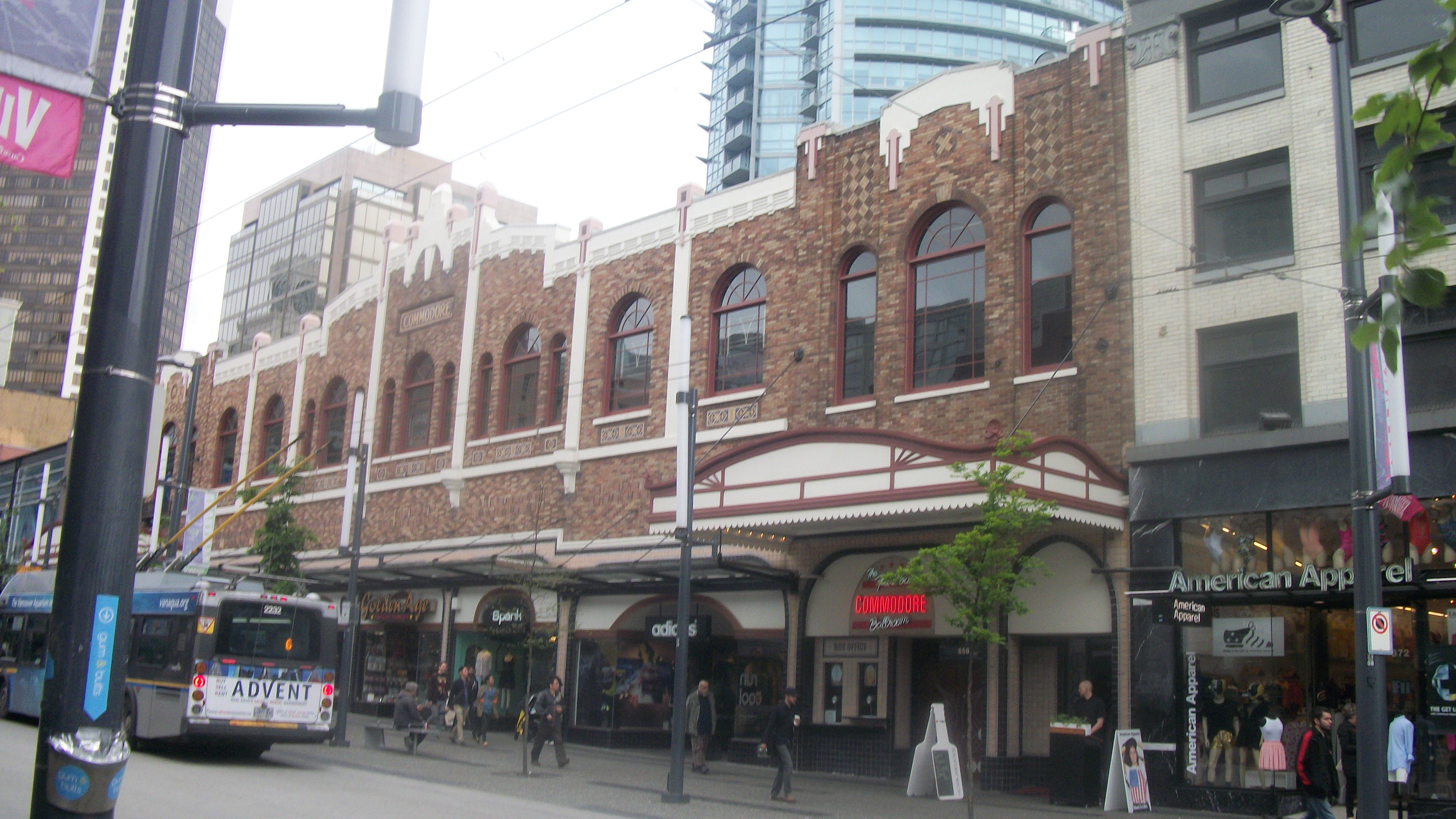
- Interactive map of Commodore Ballroom
- Former names: Commodore Cabaret
- Address: 868 Granville Street, Vancouver, British Columbia, Canada
- Coordinates: 49°16′50″N 123°7′15″W
- Owner: Live Nation
- Seating type: Standing room and table seating
- Capacity: 990

Construction
- Built: 1929
- Opened: December 1929, reopened November 12, 1999
- Renovated: 1999
- Closed: 1930, 1996–99
- Cost: C$3.5 million renovation

Website
- www.commodoreballroom.com

Commodore Ballroom is a music venue, dance floor and nightclub located on 800 block of Granville Street in Vancouver, British Columbia. It is regarded as Canada's most influential nightclub, and one of North America's best live music venues. The building was built in the Art Deco style of the late 1920s by George Conrad Reifel and designed by architect H.H. Gillingham. Best known for showcasing special performances, the venue is also known for its sprung dance floor, whose horsehair lining absorbs, rather than reflecting back, some of the impact of dancers' feet. At the time it was installed, only a few venues in the world had similar floors.

The general-admission ballroom accommodates approximately 990 guests (including standing room and table seating).

The building's street level was built for retail outlets, some of them in their time also notable. Downstairs, below street level, is the Commodore Lanes, a vintage bowling alley and poolroom.

Commodore was named one of "North America's Top 10 Most Influential Clubs" by Billboard Magazine. It is both the only Canadian venue and the oldest venue on the list. Conde Nast Traveler has also titled it one of North America's finest live music venues.

== History ==
The building opened in December 1929 as the Commodore Cabaret. With the onset of the Great Depression, the venue briefly closed four months later. It reopened in November 1930, and has since operated under several different owners.

From 1936 to 1939, shows by bandleader Charlie Pawlett (d. 1981), originally of Nanaimo and a trumpet and violin player, were broadcast on CJOR radio.

Sammy Davis Jr. played The Commodore in 1948, and was interviewed there by CKMO radio host Wilf Ray. Other notable acts in following decades included Duke Ellington and Tommy Dorsey.

In 1969, management of The Commodore was taken over by Drew Burns, launching an era which saw the ballroom transformed into a major rock'n'roll venue.

The Commodore closed in 1996, but after $3.5 million in renovations, including a new hardwood dance floor, it reopened under the House of Blues banner on November 12, 1999. House of Blues hosted a 75th Anniversary celebration season from December 2003, 2004 to December 4, 2005, though began celebrations early on October 16, 2004 with a performance by Tom Waits.

Over the years the venue has hosted notable Grammy Award or Juno Award winning performers such as The Tragically Hip, The Weeknd, James Brown, U2, Coldplay, Radiohead, Sting, Red Hot Chili Peppers, Weezer, The Police, Pearl Jam, Kiss, Tina Turner, The Beastie Boys, Nirvana, Kid Rock, Moist, Oasis, Dr. Dre, Katy Perry, Lady Gaga, Ice-T, Johnny Winter, Wiz Khalifa, and Metric.

Extreme metal band Strapping Young Lad recorded their live DVD For Those Aboot to Rock here on January 16, 2004. It was later released the same year on November 2.

For many years, the venue was also noted for an annual St. Patrick's Day concert by the influential local Celtic rock band Spirit of the West. When the band announced its retirement due to lead singer John Mann's declining health, the venue also hosted the band's final concerts in April 2016.
