= Artificial Language =

American progressive metal band

- Origin: Fresno, California, United States
- Genres: Progressive metal, progressive rock
- Years active: 2015–present
- Members: Shay Lewis; Victor Corral; Charlie Robbins; Josh Riojas; Jonathon Simpson; Jeron Schapansky
- Website: www.artificiallanguagemusic.com

Artificial Language is an American progressive metal band from Fresno, California founded in late 2015 by guitarists Victor Corral and Charlie Robbins, bassist Josh Riojas, keyboardist Jonathon Simpson and drummer Jeron Schapansky, all hailing from the Central Valley area. Vocalist Shay Lewis, from Rhode Island, joined them later.

Songs are primally written by Robbins, with the remaining members adding their inputs. Lewis and Corral write the vocal melodies and concepts. They cite Steven Wilson, Between the Buried and Me, Dream Theater, and Danny Elfman as influences.

== History ==
All members except for vocalist Shay Lewis met in the local music scene of Fresno. Lewis came from Rhode Island to join them later, after they put out a request for a singer.

After working on it for 3 or 4 years, the band self-released their debut album The Observer on April 28, 2017. It was preceded by the single "These Aren't Mirages", released five days before. The album follows an observer "who doesn't really understand humanity [...] watching over 6 different events that happen throughout the duration of the album and eventually longs for the Human Condition".

In a review for Prog, Chris Cope said the band "have just about got it very, very right" for a debut album.

On April 13, 2019, they released the single "Trail of Lights" and announced their second album, Now We Sleep, which was released on May 17 and featured Michael Lessard (The Contortionist) on guest vocals for the title track. Now We Sleep was included among the "honorable mentions" of PopMatters's list of best progressive rock/metal albums of that year and was considered one of the "surprise albums of the year" by Sonic Perspectives.

== Members ==
- Shay Lewis – lead vocals (2015–present)
- Charlie Robbins – lead guitar (2015–present)
- Victor Corral – rhythm guitar (2015–present)
- Josh Riojas – bass (2015–present)
- Jonathon Simpson – keyboards (2015–present)
- Jeron Schapansky – drums (2015–present)

== Discography ==
=== Studio albums ===
- The Observer (2017)
- Now We Sleep (2019)

=== EPs ===
- Distant Glow (2024)

=== Singles ===
- "These Aren't Mirages" (2017)
- "Trail of Lights" (2019)
