= Marcel Roux =

French painter, engraver (1878–1922)

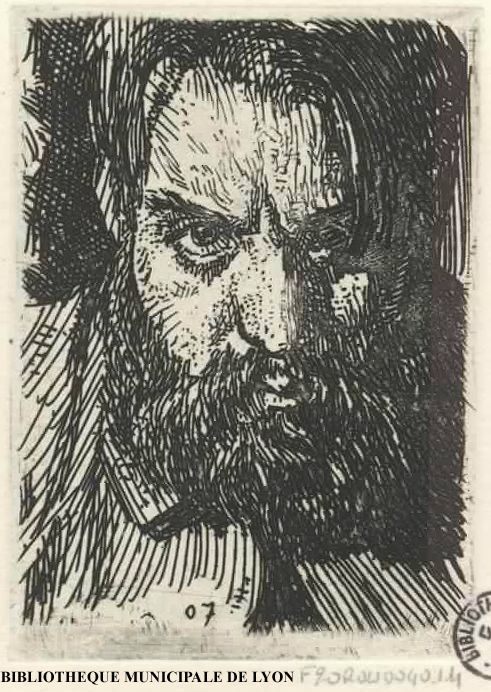
- Self-portrait, c. 1920
- Born: 11 September 1878; Bessenay, Rhône, France
- Died: 19 January 1922 (aged 43); Chartres, Eure-et-Loir, France

Marcel Roux (September 11, 1878 – January 19, 1922) was a French painter and engraver.

A devout Catholic, he often explored the decadence of turn-of-the-century life through images of its suffering. This includes his Danse Macabre portfolio of 15 etchings from 1904–05 that draws on the tradition of the dance of death.

== Sources ==
- Davenport, Nancy (1999). "Marcel Roux graveur. L'emprise du péché dans la France fin de siècle". Nouvelles de l'Estampe (164). Bibliothèque Nationale de France, Paris.
- Vitacca, Sara (2021). "Roux, Marcel (1878)". Allgemeines Künstlerlexikon (online ed.). New York: K. G. Saur; De Gruyter.
- "Roux, Marcel". Benezit Dictionary of Artists (online ed.). Oxford University Press. 2011. doi:10.1093/benz/9780199773787.article.B00157122.
