= From These Waters =

Studio album by Loch Vostok
- Released: 27 March 2015
- Recorded: 2014
- Genre: Progressive metal
- Length: 47:47
- Label: ViciSolum Productions

Loch Vostok chronology
V: The Doctrine Decoded (2012)	From These Waters (2015)

From These Waters is the sixth studio album released by the Swedish progressive metal band, Loch Vostok. The album was released worldwide on 27 March 2015. This album was recorded and mixed at Blueflame Productions in Sweden.

Loch Vostok released a music video for the title track on YouTube on 10 July 2015, and the album received overall good reviews internationally.

== Track listing ==
All lyrics are written by Teddy Möller; all music is composed by Möller, except where noted

Standard edition
No.	Title	Length
1.	"Like Poison to the Stars"	4:26
2.	"I Implode"	4:08
3.	"From These Waters"	3:18
4.	"Fighting Fire With Blood"	5:31
5.	"Lost in Transmutance"	4:48
6.	"Dead Sea Trolls" (Teddy Möller & Jimmy Mattsson)	4:25
7.	"And the Storm Spread its Wings"	4:12
8.	"Sentiment"	6:02
9.	"Me Forgotten"	5:03
10.	"They Brought the Dark"	5:54
Total length:		47:47

== Credits ==
- Teddy Möller – vocals, guitar
- Niklas Kupper – guitar, vocals
- Fredrik Klingwall – keyboard
- Jimmy Mattsson – bass guitar
- Lawrence Dinamarca – drums
