= Exercises in Futility (Mgła album) =

Studio album by Mgła
- Released: 4 September 2015
- Genre: Black metal
- Length: 42:12
- Label: Northern Heritage

Mgła chronology
With Hearts Toward None (2012)	Exercises in Futility (2015)	Age of Excuse (2019)

Exercises in Futility is the third studio album by Polish black metal band Mgła. It was released on 4 September 2015, through Northern Heritage Records. Featuring "a raw, melodic black metal" style that was compared to those of Watain and early Burzum, the album is regarded as "the biggest and most impactful release of the band's 15-year career." The front cover features an artwork from French engraver Marcel Roux, titled L'aveugle ("The blind", 1908).

The band embarked a North American tour following the album's release.

== Critical reception ==
Professional ratings
Review scores
Source	Rating
Pitchfork	7.8/10

Exercises in Futility was met with positive responses. Andy O'Connor of Pitchfork praised the album, stating, "Mgła are the true heirs to Dissection's style of black metal; the melodies are huge without dipping into the saccharine." O'Connor further stated: "Mgła's accomplished performance on Futility transforms the lyrical content into a call to action."

Exercise in Futility was listed as number 8 on Pitchfork's "The Best Metal Albums of 2015" list.

== Track listing ==
1. "Exercises in Futility I" – 7:58
2. "Exercises in Futility II" – 7:48
3. "Exercises in Futility III" – 4:37
4. "Exercises in Futility IV" – 4:45
5. "Exercises in Futility V" – 8:15
6. "Exercises in Futility VI" – 8:49

== Personnel ==
- Mikołaj "M." Żentara – guitar, bass, vocals, recording
- Maciej "Darkside" Kowalski – drums, recording
