= Order Shall Prevail =

Studio album by Jungle Rot
- Released: June 30, 2015
- Recorded: Belle City Sound Company, Racine, Wisconsin
- Genre: Death metal
- Length: 36:33
- Label: Victory
- Producer: Chris "Wisco" Djuricic & Jungle Rot

Jungle Rot chronology
Terror Regime (2013)	Order Shall Prevail (2015)	Jungle Rot (2018)

Professional ratings
Review scores
Source	Rating
HeavyMetal.About.com	4/5 stars
New Noise Magazine	4/5 stars

Order Shall Prevail is the ninth studio album by American death metal band Jungle Rot, released through Victory Records on June 30, 2015.

== Track listing ==
No.	Title	Length
1.	"Doomsday"	3:58
2.	"Paralyzed Prey"	3:50
3.	"Blood Revenge"	3:05
4.	"Fight Where You Stand (feat. Max Cavalera of Soulfly)"	4:13
5.	"Order Shall Prevail"	4:33
6.	"The Dread Pestilence"	3:46
7.	"I Cast the First Stone"	2:50
8.	"E.F.K."	2:24
9.	"Trench Tactics"	3:47
10.	"Nuclear Superiority"	3:47
Total length:		36:33

== Personnel ==
- David Matrise: Guitars/Lead Vocals
- James Genenz: Bass Guitar/Backing Vocals
- Geoff Bub: Lead Guitar
- Joey Muha: Drums
- Chris "Wisco" Djuricic: Producer
- Gyula Havancsak: Artwork & Design
