= Mgła =

Polish black metal band

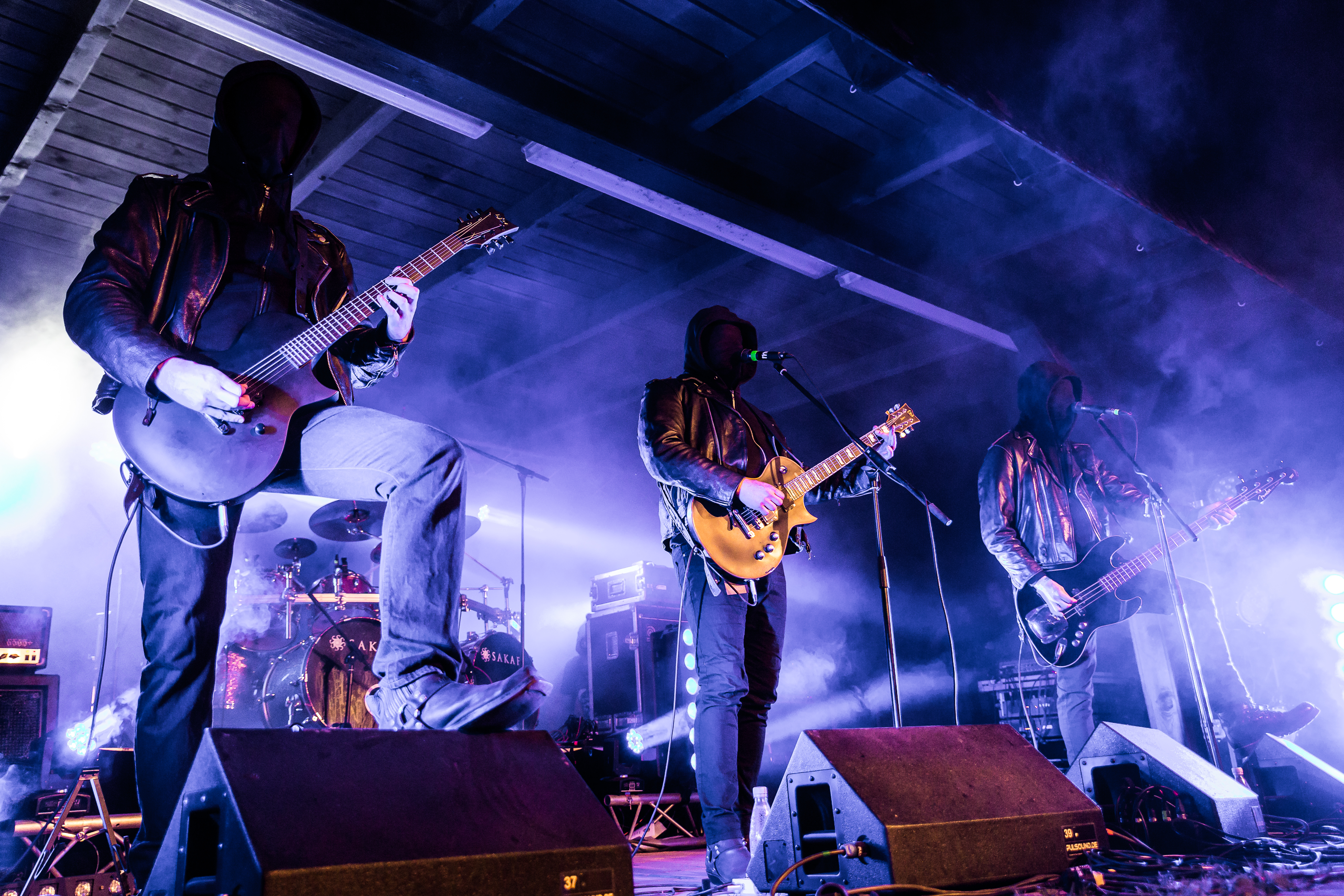
- Mgła performing in 2019

Background information
- Origin: Kraków, Poland
- Genre: Black metal
- Years active: 2000–present
- Labels: Northern Heritage Records; No Solace; Malignant Voices; Garazel Productions; Todeskult
- Members: M. Darkside
- Past members: Daren
- Website: no-solace.bandcamp.com

Logo

Mgła (/məˈɡwɑː/; Polish: [mgwa]; English: "Fog") is a Polish black metal band from Kraków, formed in 2000. The duo consists of vocalist, guitarist and bassist M. (Mikołaj Żentara) and drummer Darkside (Maciej Kowalski).

The band has released four albums, and began performing live in 2012 with a touring guitarist and bassist.

== History ==
Vocalist and multi-instrumentalist Mikołaj "M." Żentara and drummer Dariusz "Daren" Piper, both from the band Kriegsmaschine, founded the group as a studio project in 2000 in Kraków. The duo recorded two unreleased demos, two EPs, and the split album Crushing the Holy Trinity with Deathspell Omega, Clandestine Blaze, Exordium, and Musta Surma. Piper left the band in 2006 and was replaced with Maciej "Darkside" Kowalski. The band signed to Northern Heritage Records in 2008 and released their debut album Groza that year. Mgła signed to Northern Heritage for three albums, but after their fourth album Age of Excuse, the band has released material on No Solace.

In 2012, after the release of their second album With Hearts Toward None, the band played their first concerts. Mgła's first live lineup included guitarist Silencer from the band Medico Peste and bassist The Fall. According to Żentara, the live lineup rehearsed for over a year before touring. In 2015, Silencer left and was replaced with E.V.T., also from Medico Peste. Mgła released their third album Exercises in Futility in 2015, followed by a tour in North America. Their first show in the United States was on 6 November in New York City's Saint Vitus.

That year, Żentara and Kowalski created the No Solace label, named after Żentara's studio, which releases music from Mgła, Kriegsmaschine, and other projects. In 2015 and 2016, the duo served as the backing band for several shows of one-man black metal project Clandestine Blaze.

Mgła cancelled scheduled April 2019 shows in Munich and Berlin after the German Antifa group Linkes Bündnis gegen Antisemitismus München (English: Left Alliance Against Anti-Semitism Munich) launched a campaign against Mgła for releasing albums on Northern Heritage, a label that sells National Socialist black metal material. Mgła referred to the "smear campaign" as "false accusations of political nature", and announced they would take legal action for defamation.

On 3 August 2019, the band revealed their fourth album's title, Age of Excuse, and released lead single "Age of Excuse II". The album came out on 2 September. Mgła's first Latin America tour was cut short in March 2020 after seven shows because of the COVID-19 pandemic. The band resumed touring in late 2021. After playing 80 shows in 30 countries throughout 2022, Mgła announced in December that live concerts would be placed "on hold" while the band records.

In 2023, Kowalski and Mgła's touring bassist Michał "The Fall" Stępień released the debut single of their project Hauntologist, "Ozymandian." The project's debut album, Hollow, was released on January 8, 2024. Both were announced through Mgła's social media channels.

In 2025, to commemorate the tenth anniversary of Exercises in Futility, the band put out the previously unreleased track "World-without-us." The song's guitars and drums were recorded in 2015, while the bass and vocals were arranged and recorded in 2025.

== Members ==
Current

- M. (Mikołaj Żentara) – lead vocals, rhythm guitar, bass (studio only), lead guitar (studio only) (2000–present)
- Darkside (Maciej Kowalski) – drums, percussion (2006–present)

Former

- Daren (Dariusz Piper) – drums, percussion (2000–2006)

=== Live musicians ===
Current

- The Fall (Michał "ShellShocked" Stępień) – bass, backing vocals (2012–present)
- E.V.T. (Piotr Dziemski) – lead guitar, backing vocals (2015–present)

Former

- Silencer (Jakub "Lazarus" Tratwiński) – lead guitar, backing vocals (2012–2015)

== Discography ==
=== Studio albums ===
- Groza (2008)
- With Hearts Toward None (2012)
- Exercises in Futility (2015)
- Age of Excuse (2019)

=== EPs ===
- Presence (2006)
- Mdłości (2006)
- Further Down the Nest (2007)

=== Singles ===
- World Without Us (2025)

=== Compilation albums ===
- Mdłości + Further Down the Nest (2007)
- Presence / Power and Will (2013)
- Torn Aether (Live Recordings 2013-2022) (2024)

=== Split albums ===
- Crushing the Holy Trinity (2005) with Deathspell Omega, Stabat Mater, Musta Surma, Clandestine Blaze, Exordium

=== Unreleased demos ===
- Northwards (2000)
- Necrotic (2001)
