= Obsequiae =

Medieval metal band formed in 2007

- Origin: Minneapolis, Minnesota, U.S.
- Genres: Medieval metal; melodic black metal
- Years active: 2007–present
- Labels: Bindrune; 20 Buck Spin
- Members: Tanner Anderson; Vicente La Camera Mariño; Andrew Della Cagna
- Past members: Neidhart von Reuental

Obsequiae is an American medieval metal band formed in 2007 in Minneapolis, Minnesota. The current line-up of the band consists of Tanner Anderson (vocals, guitar, bass), Vicente La Camera Mariño (harp) and Andrew Della Cagna (drums). The band's debut album, Obsequiae’s Suspended in the Brume of Eos, was released in 2011. Its 2015 follow-up, Aria of Vernal Tombs, received positive reviews from music outlets such as Pitchfork, Spin and Decibel.

The band's music has been described as "castle metal" a "mishmash of medieval music and melodic black metal," with additional influences from doom metal and death metal.

== Members ==
Current members

- Tanner Anderson – vocals, guitar, bass (2007–present)
- Vicente La Camera Mariño – harp
- Andrew Della Cagna – drums (2011–present)
- Eoghan McCloskey - drums (2019–present)

Former members

- Neidhart von Reuental – drums, bass

Live members

- Andy Klockow – bass (2015–present)
- Timothy Glenn – drums (2015–2018)
- Eoghan McCloskey - drums (2019–present)
- Carl Skildum – guitar (2015–present)
- Brandon Almendinger – vocals (2015–present)
- Gautier d'Espinal – guitar (2009-2010)

== Discography ==
Studio albums

- Suspended in the Brume of Eos (2011)
- Aria of Vernal Tombs (2015)
- The Palms of Sorrowed Kings (2019)

Demos

- Obsequiae (2009)
