= Jungle Rot =

American death metal band

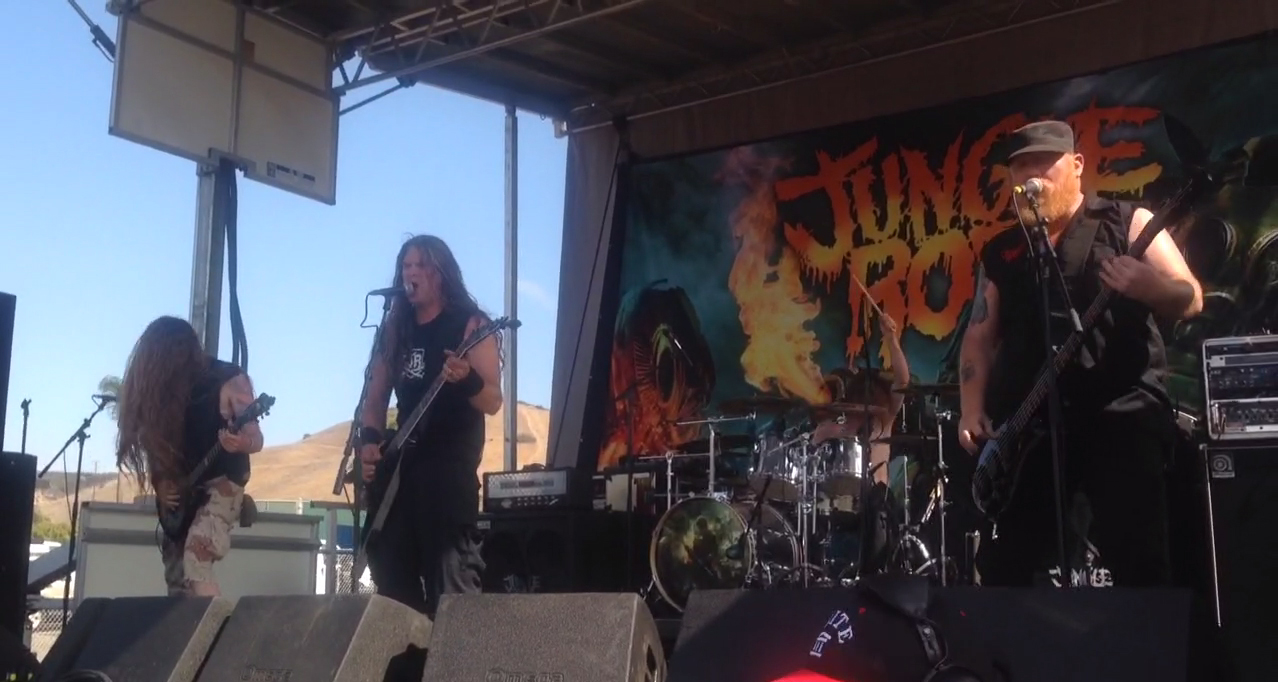
- Jungle Rot in 2015

Background information
- Origin: Kenosha, Wisconsin, U.S.
- Genre: Death metal
- Years active: 1992–present
- Labels: Unique Leader, Victory, Napalm, Olympic, Season of Mist, Century Media, Crash, Pulverizer, S.O.D., Pure Death
- Members: Dave Matrise; James Genenz; Geoff Bub; Spenser Syphers
- Past members: Jim Bell; Kevin Forsythe; Joey Lohr; Joe Carlino; Shawn Johnson; Chris Djuricic; Brian Kuhn; Mike LeGros; Jim Garcia; Jim Harte; Rob Pandola; Neil Zacharek; Jerry Sturino; Eric House; Jesse Beahler; Joe Thomas

Jungle Rot is an American death metal band from Kenosha, Wisconsin, formed in 1992.

== History ==
Jim Harte and Joe Thomas, members of Illinois thrash metal band Prisoner, founded Jungle Rot in 1992 as a side project. The name refers to jungle rot, a skin infection that occurs in tropical climates. The band recorded their first demo, Rip Off Your Face, heavily influenced by S.O.D., Madball, Bolt Thrower, Autopsy, and Celtic Frost. They recruited Kenosha-based guitarist Dave Matrise (Num Skull, Nocturnal, Fatal Violence) in 1993. In 1994, Matrise took over the band. They refined their style and released their second demo, Skin The Living, in 1995, the year Matrise claims the band began.

After their first two demos, the band signed to American independent label Pure Death Records, owned at the time by Jamey Jasta of Hatebreed, where they released their first album, a repackaging of Skin the Living, in 1996. In late 1997, their second album, Slaughter the Weak, was released on independent label Pulverizer Records.

The EP Darkness Foretold was released in 1998 by the small label S.O.D. Records, spearheaded by the creator of underground music magazine Sounds of Death, and featured covers of Slayer's "Fight Til Death" and Carnivore's "Jesus Hitler". The initial pressing of Darkness Foretold came with a limited-edition Jungle Rot Comic Book. The next two full-length studio albums, 2001's Dead And Buried and 2004's Fueled By Hate, were released by Olympic Recordings in partnership with Century Media Records.

In 2005, the core of Jungle Rot came together when Matrise enlisted Chicago native James Genenz (Fleshgrind, Avernus, Dead For Days, Reign Inferno, God Dementia) on bass guitar and guitarist Geoff Bub (Destiss, Putrid Dissentary). The three members shared the songwriting, though Genenz wrote the bulk of the lyrics.

They toured with bands like Deicide, Goatwhore, Cattle Decapitation, Krisiun, The Black Dahlia Murder, 25 Ta Life, Hate Eternal, Incantation, and Vital Remains. In mid-2006, the band released the album Warzone on Crash Music. This was the first album to feature Matrise, Genenz, and Bub. In 2008, they headlined a European tour with support from Warmaster, Downswitch, and Walking Corpse.

The band signed with Napalm Records in January 2009 and released What Horrors Await in June 2009. A European tour with Six Feet Under followed shortly after, along with a headlining run across the United States. In April 2011, the band signed with Victory Records and released Kill on Command on June 21, 2011. On March 19, 2013, Jungle Rot released their eighth album through Victory Records, Terror Regime. The band toured to support the album with metal groups including Suffocation, Obituary, Broken Hope and Decrepit Birth.

On April 14, 2015, it was announced that Jungle Rot would play the entirety of the 2015 Rockstar Energy Drink Mayhem Festival, performing on the Victory Records stage.

In early 2015, the band played the 70000 Tons of Metal cruise, and announced via their social media that they were working on their ninth studio album, Order Shall Prevail, to be released later in the year on Victory Records. Pre-orders for the album were announced on May 26, along with the album's track listing, release date of June 30, and a stream for the single "Paralyzed Prey." On May 27, 2015, it was revealed that Max Cavalera (Sepultura, Soulfly, Cavalera Conspiracy) would sing on the track "Fight Where You Stand". On June 29, the official music video for the single "Paralyzed Prey" premiered on Vevo.

On March 7, 2016, Jungle Rot released a video for the track "Doomsday" via Victory Records. The band was announced as part of the 2016 edition of the Metal Alliance Tour alongside Dying Fetus and The Acacia Strain.

In the summer of 2017, Jungle Rot completed a US and Canada tour with German thrash band Destruction and California's Warbringer, performed in Central America, headlined shows in Nicaragua, Costa Rica, Guatemala, and Mexico, and announced that they would enter the studio in January 2018 to record their 10th studio album, to be released in mid-2018. It was revealed that former drummer Jesse Beahler would play on this album.

On June 8, 2018, the band announced the release of their self-titled tenth album. Two singles were released in June 2018, "A Burning Cinder" and "Fearmonger", the latter featuring guest vocals from Destruction frontman Schmier. The album was released on Digipak CD, vinyl, and limited cassette on July 20, 2018.

Later in June 2018, bassist/lyricist James Genenz was assaulted, which left him with multiple injuries including a shattered ankle. After two surgeries, Genenz sat out of the entirety of touring for the remainder of 2018, which included a North American tour with Havok and Extinction AD. In the spring of 2019, Genenz regrouped with the band and they headlined a European tour with openers Ultra-Violence. The band played through Austria, Slovakia, Italy, Switzerland, Germany, Belgium, Great Britain and Holland. Jungle Rot returned to the states and toured with Deicide, Origin, and The Absence for another month before heading back to Europe for a few weeks. During this run, Jungle Rot headlined shows in Holland, Sweden, Poland, Germany, France, Hungary, Czech Republic and made appearances at the metal festivals Brutal Assault, Party San Open Air, Stonehenge Festival, and Poet Fest. Jungle Rot performed at the Full Terror Assault Festival in Illinois and a hometown show before beginning to work on their next album.

Spenser Syphers was announced as the new permanent drummer for Jungle Rot in June 2019.

On March 22, 2022, the band announced their eleventh album, A Call to Arms, would be released on May 13.

The band played at Milwaukee Metal Fest in May of 2023.

The band's twelfth album, "Cruel Face Of War", was released on May 15th, 2026 on Unique Leader Records

== Personnel ==
Current

- Dave Matrise – vocals, rhythm guitar (1994–present)
- James Genenz – bass, backing vocals (2005–present), guitars (2004–2005)
- Geoff Bub – lead guitar, backing vocals (2005–present)
- Spenser Syphers – drums (2019–present)

Former

- Joe Thomas – guitars, vocals (1992–1994)
- Jim Harte – drums (1992–1997)
- Joe Carlino – bass (1993–1994)
- Brian Kuhn – bass (1994–1995)
- Jim Bell – lead guitar (1994–2000)
- Chris "Wisco" Djuricic – bass (1995–1999, 2001–2004), lead guitar (2004)
- Rob Pandola – drums (1997–1998)
- Mike LeGros – bass (1999–2000)
- Jim Garcia – drums (1999–2002)
- Kevin Forsythe – lead guitar (2000–2002)
- Jerry Sturino – bass (2004–2005)
- Eric House – drums (2004–2006 / 2008–2010)
- Joey Lohr – lead guitar (2004–2005)
- Neil Zacharek – drums (2006–2007)
- Jesse Beahler – drums (2010–2013)

Touring musicians

- Jason Adam Borton – drums (2016)
- Remington Roberts – drums (2013–2016)
- Parker Yowell – drums (2016)
- Mike Miczek – drums (2014)
- Shawn Johnson – drums (1999)
- Tony Ochoa – drums (2010)
- Andy Vehnekamp – drums (1999)
- Joey Muha – drums (2015)
- Scott Fuller – drums (2014)
- Chris 'Wisco' Djuricic – lead guitar (2014)

Timeline

== Discography ==
Jungle Rot discography
- Studio albums: 11
- Extended plays: 4
- Live albums: 1
- Singles: 2
- Music videos: 11

=== Studio albums ===
- Skin the Living (1996, Pure Death Records)
- Slaughter the Weak (1997, Pulverizer Records)
- Dead and Buried (2001, Olympic/Century Media)
- Fueled by Hate (2004, Olympic/Century Media)
- Warzone (2006, Crash Music Inc.)
- What Horrors Await (2009, Napalm Records) (reissued by Victory Records, 2018)
- Kill on Command (2011, Victory Records)
- Terror Regime (2013, Victory Records)
- Order Shall Prevail (2015, Victory Records)
- Jungle Rot (2018, Victory Records)
- A Call to Arms (2022, Unique Leader Records)
- Cruel Face of War (2026, Unique Leader Records)

=== Demos and EPs ===
- Rip Off Your Face (1993)
- Skin the Living (1995)
- 4-tracks promo (1997)
- Darkness Foretold (1998, S.O.D. Records/Crash Music Inc.)

=== Singles ===
- "Rise Up And Revolt" (2011, Victory Records)
- "Paralyzed Prey" (2015, Victory Records)
- "Fight Where You Stand" (feat. Max Cavalera) (2015, Victory Records)
- "Speed Freak" Hallows Eve cover (2016, Victory Records)
- "Fearmonger (feat. Schmier)" (2018, Victory Records)
- "A Burning Cinder" (2018, Victory Records)

=== DVDs ===
- Live in Germany (2006, Crash Music, Inc.)

=== Music videos ===
- "Victims Of Violence" (2006, directed by Dave Paul)
- "Worst Case Scenario" (2010, directed by Jason Meudt & Emmett Austin)
- "Rise Up And Revolt" (2011, directed by Eric Richter)
- "Blood Ties" (2012, directed by Eric Richter)
- "Blind Devotion" (2013, directed by Eric Richter)
- "Terror Regime" (2013, directed by Eric Richter)
- "Carpet Bombing" (2013, directed by Eric Richter)
- "Utter Chaos" (2013, directed by Eric Richter)
- "Ruthless Omnipotence" (2013, directed by Eric Richter)
- "Paralyzed Prey" (2015, directed by Dustin Smith)
- "Doomsday" (2016, directed by Dustin Smith)
- "The Unstoppable" (2018, directed by Dustin Smith)
- "A Burning Cinder" (2018, directed by Dustin Smith)
- "Send Forth Oblivion" (2018, directed by Dustin Smith)
- "A Call to Arms" (2022)
- "Genocidal Imperium" (2022)
- "Apocalyptic Dawn" (2026, directed by Alex Zarek)
- "Maniacal" (2026, directed by Alex Zarek)

=== Compilation appearances ===
- Darkness Foretold appeared on "Sampler #12" (CD, Pulverised Records / S.O.D. Magazine, 1998)
- Fight Till Death (Slayer cover) appeared on "Straight to Hell: A Tribute to Slayer" (CD, Cleopatra/Deadline, 1999)
- Left For Dead appeared on "Road Kill Vol. 2" (CD, Pavement Music, 1999)
- Tomb Of Armenus appeared on "Deftone 2/99" (CD, Deftone Magazine, Feb 1999)
- Darkness Foretold appeared on "The Morbid One" (CD, Morbid Records, 1999)
- Humans Shall Pay appeared on "Fire on the Brain – Volume 1" (CD, Olympic, 2001)
- Face Down appeared on "Metal for the Masses Vol. 3" (2×CD, Century Media Records, 2004)
- Butchering Death appeared on "Dreaded Compilation Vol. Sicks" (Cassette tape, Copremesis Records)
- Gorebag appeared on "Death Metal Legends" (CD, Pavement Music, 2008)
