= Tribulation (band) =

Swedish heavy metal band

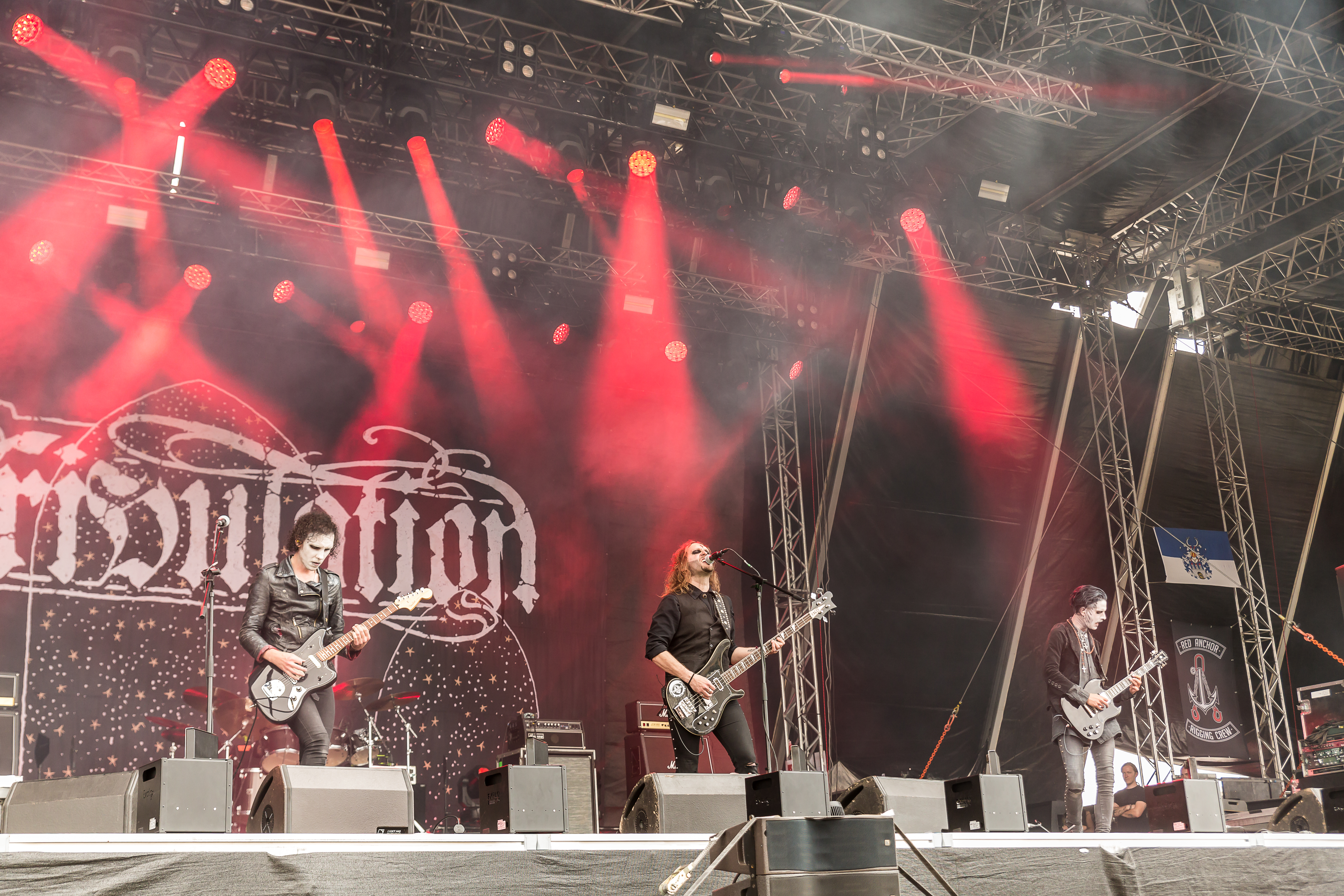
- Tribulation performing at Rockharz Open Air 2023

Background information
- Also known as: Hazard (2001–2004)
- Origin: Arvika, Sweden
- Genres: Gothic metal; heavy metal; black metal; death metal (early)
- Years active: 2005–present
- Labels: Century Media, Metal Blade, Blood Harvest, Pulverised
- Members: Adam Zaars; Johannes Andersson; Oscar Leander; Joseph Tholl
- Past members: Jakob Johansson; Jakob Ljungberg; Jonathan Hultén
- Website: tribulation.se

Tribulation is a Swedish heavy metal band from Arvika that formed in 2005. In early 2009, the band released its debut studio album, The Horror. Their second full-length studio album, The Formulas of Death, was released in 2013. In 2015, they released their third full-length studio album, Children of the Night, a departure from the death metal of their first two albums, drawing on traditional heavy metal, black metal and gothic rock as well as the occult and mythology. Decibel described the group as "blackened goth metallers".

== Band members ==
Tribulation live at Party.San 2023

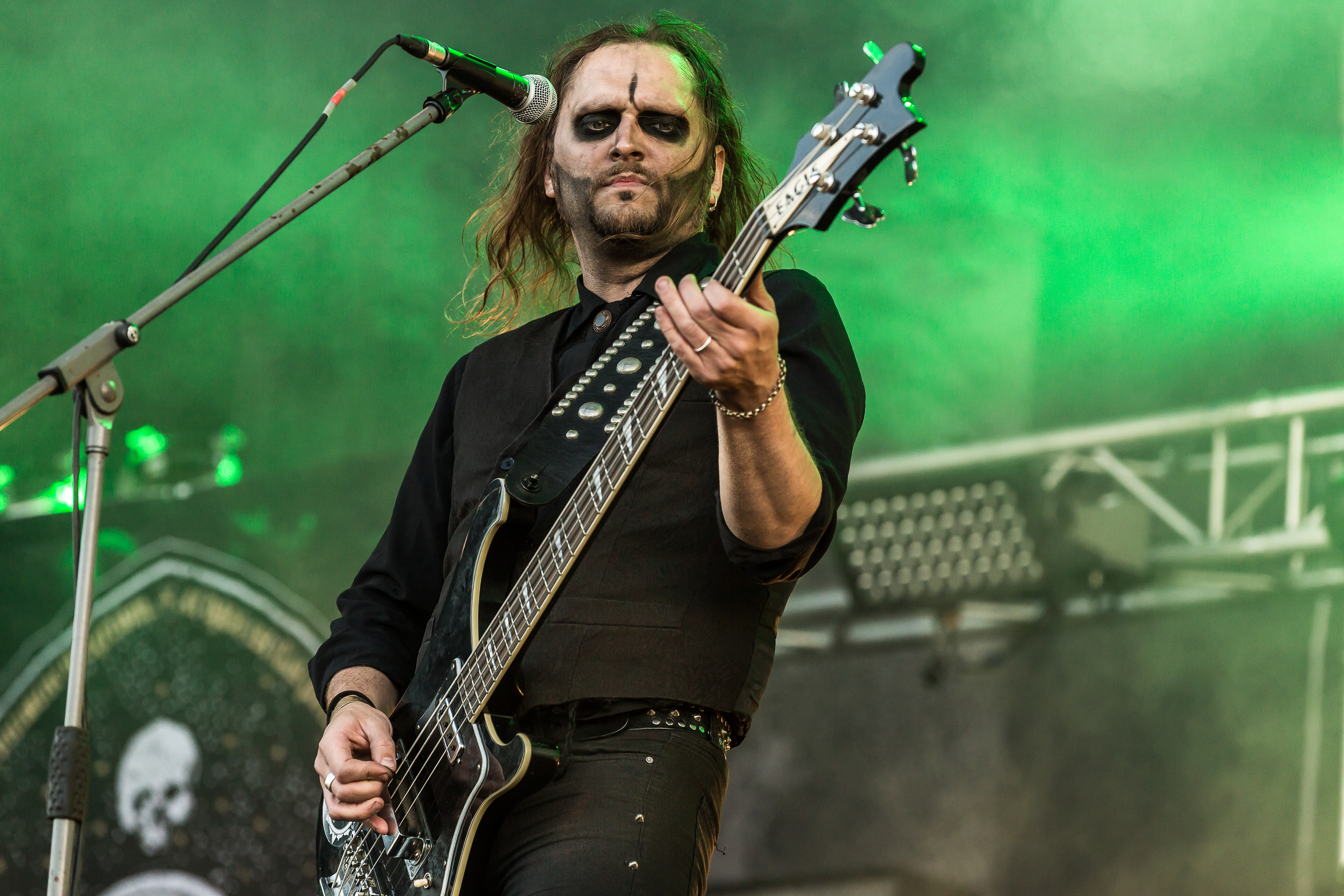
Johannes Andersson

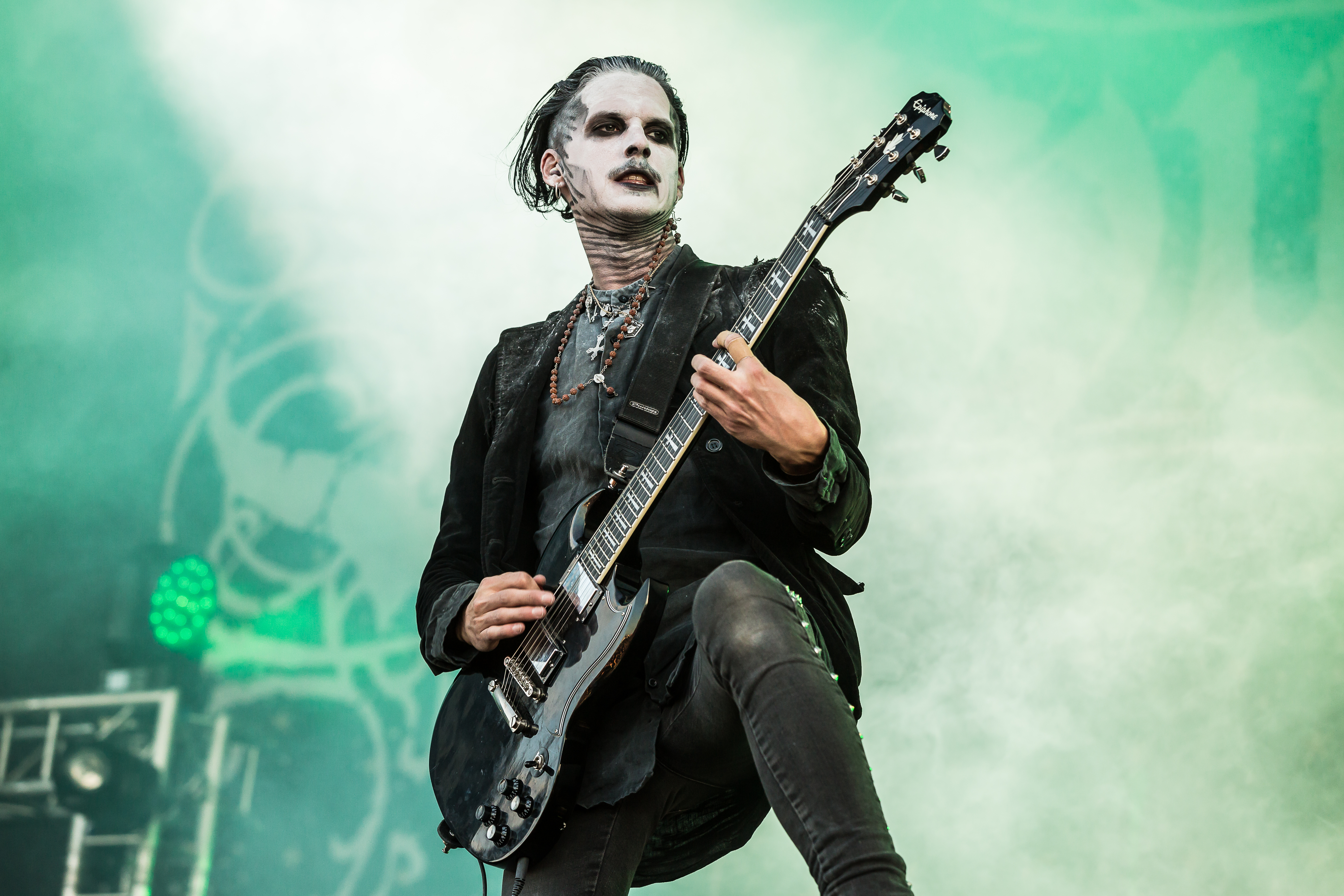
Adam Zaars

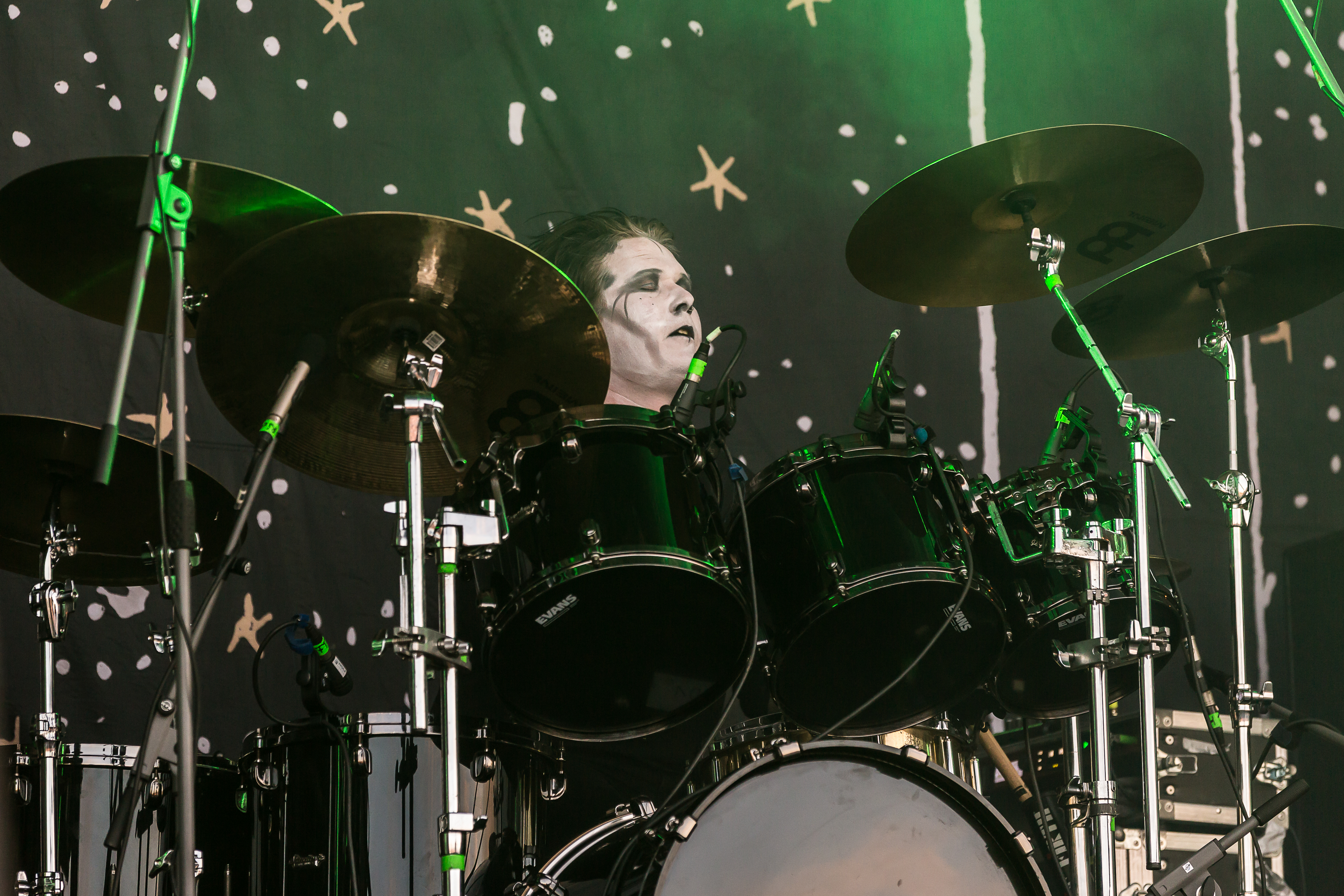
Oscar Leander

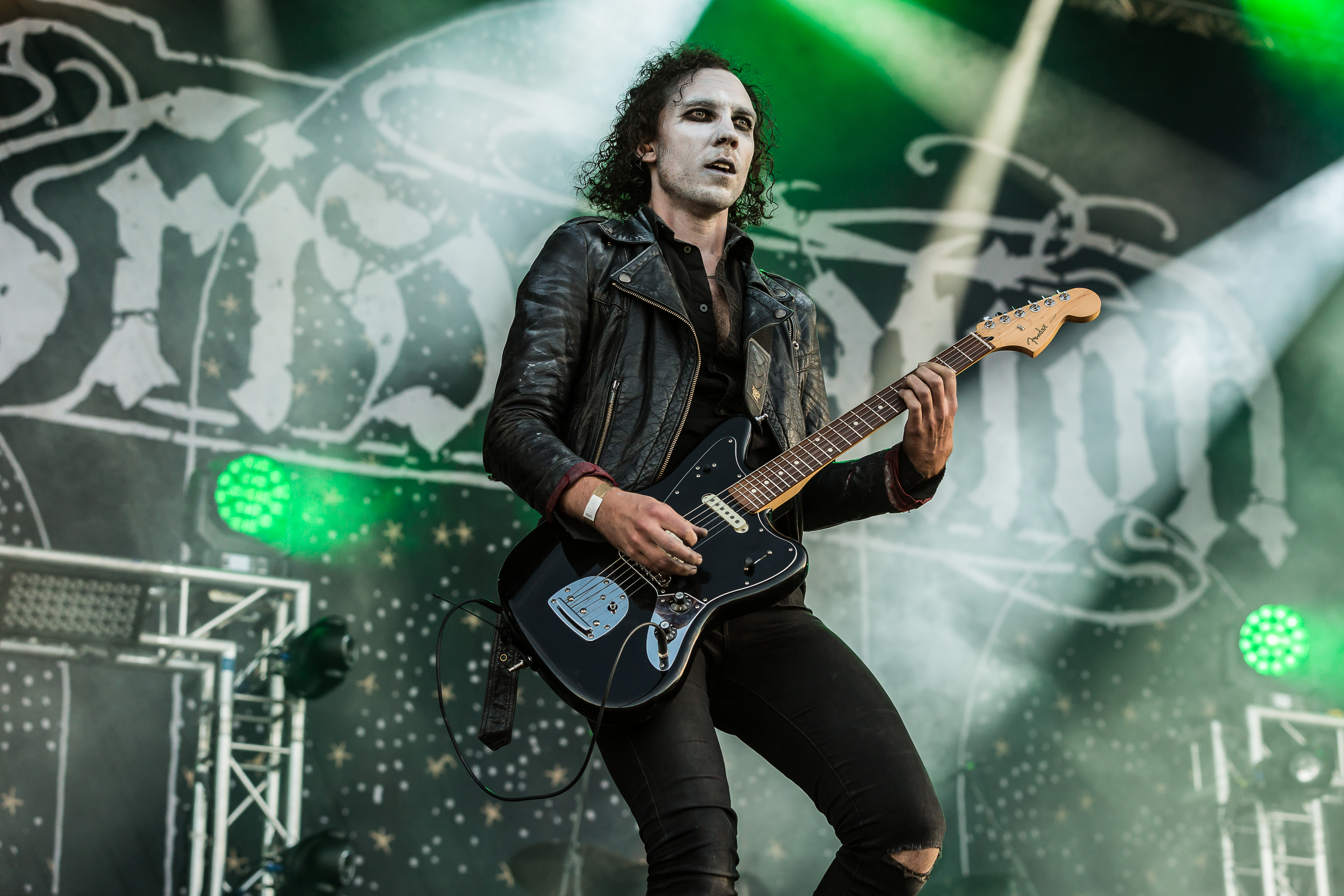
Joseph Tholl

Current

- Johannes Andersson – bass, vocals (2005–present)
- Adam Zaars – rhythm guitar (2005–present)
- Oscar Leander – drums (2017–present)
- Joseph Tholl – lead guitar (2020–present)

Former

- Jakob Johansson – drums (2005–2012)
- Jakob Ljungberg – drums (2012–2017)
- Jonathan Hultén – lead guitar (2005–2020)

== Discography ==
=== Studio albums ===
- The Horror (2009)
- The Formulas of Death (2013)
- The Children of the Night (2015)
- Down Below (2018)
- Where the Gloom Becomes Sound (2021)
- Sub Rosa In Æternum (2024)

=== EPs ===
- Putrid Rebirth (2006)
- Waiting for the Death Blow (2015)
- Melancholia (2016)
- Lady Death (2017)
- Nightbound (2018)
- Hamartia (2023)

=== Live albums ===
- Alive & Dead at Södra Teatern (2019)
