= The Children of the Night (album) =

Studio album by Tribulation
- Released: 20 April 2015
- Genre: Gothic metal; heavy metal; black 'n' roll
- Length: 56:32
- Label: Century Media
- Producer: Ola Ersfjord

Tribulation chronology
The Formulas of Death (2013)	The Children of the Night (2015)	Down Below (2018)

The Children of the Night is the third studio album by Swedish heavy metal band Tribulation. It was released on 20 April 2015 through Century Media Records.

== Musical style ==
The album's sound is a stark departure from the death metal style of Tribulation's previous records. It features a heavy metal and extreme metal sound with elements from psychedelic rock, progressive metal, thrash metal, classic rock, hard rock, and gothic rock. It attributes influences to various rock and metal music acts such as Mercyful Fate, At the Gates, Led Zeppelin, Hawkwind, the Doors, Iron Maiden, Deep Purple and Pink Floyd.

The title of the album is a reference to Kiss's 1982 album Creatures of the Night.

== Reception ==
Professional ratings
Review scores
Source	Rating
Decibel	9/10
Pitchfork	8.4/10
Sputnikmusic	4/5 stars

The album generally received positive reviews from music critics. Chris Dick of Decibel magazine wrote: "There are few bands who are capable of Children of the Night". Pitchfork critic Grayson Haver Currin described the album as "a heavy metal record that wanders beyond any comfort zone" and "a sprawling, compulsory tale that doesn't turn dull". Loudwire's Joe DiVita thought that the record "offers a refreshing take on a beloved style with enough extreme metal elements in tact [sic] that should please fans on both sides of the fence." Michael Nelson of Stereogum regarded it as "the best record he has heard in 2015."

Pitchfork's Brandon Stosuy listed The Children of the Night as number two on his list of "The Best Metal Albums of 2015". Spin magazine critic Colin Joyce listed the album as number six on the publication's list of "The 20 Best Metal Albums of 2015".

== Track listing ==
1. "Strange Gateways Beckon" – 4:29
2. "Melancholia" – 5:17
3. "In the Dreams of the Dead" – 5:52
4. "Winds" – 6:52
5. "Själaflykt" – 5:52
6. "The Motherhood of God" – 5:23
7. "Strains of Horror" – 6:14
8. "Holy Libations" – 6:34
9. "Cauda Pavonis" – 2:55
10. "Music from the Other" – 7:04

== Personnel ==
Album personnel as adapted from album liner notes.

Tribulation

- Johannes Andersson – bass, lead vocals
- Adam Zaars – rhythm guitar, backing vocals, vibraphone, xylophone
- Jonathan Hultén – lead guitar, backing vocals
- Jakob Ljungberg – drums, percussion

Other personnel

- Martin Borgh – additional instruments
- Ola Ersfjord – producer, recording engineer, mixing
- Chris Common – mastering
- Johan Voxberg – drum technician
- Adam Zaars – design, layout
- Jonathan Hultén – cover art
- Susanna Berglund – photography
- Linda Åkerberg – photography
