= Loch Vostok =

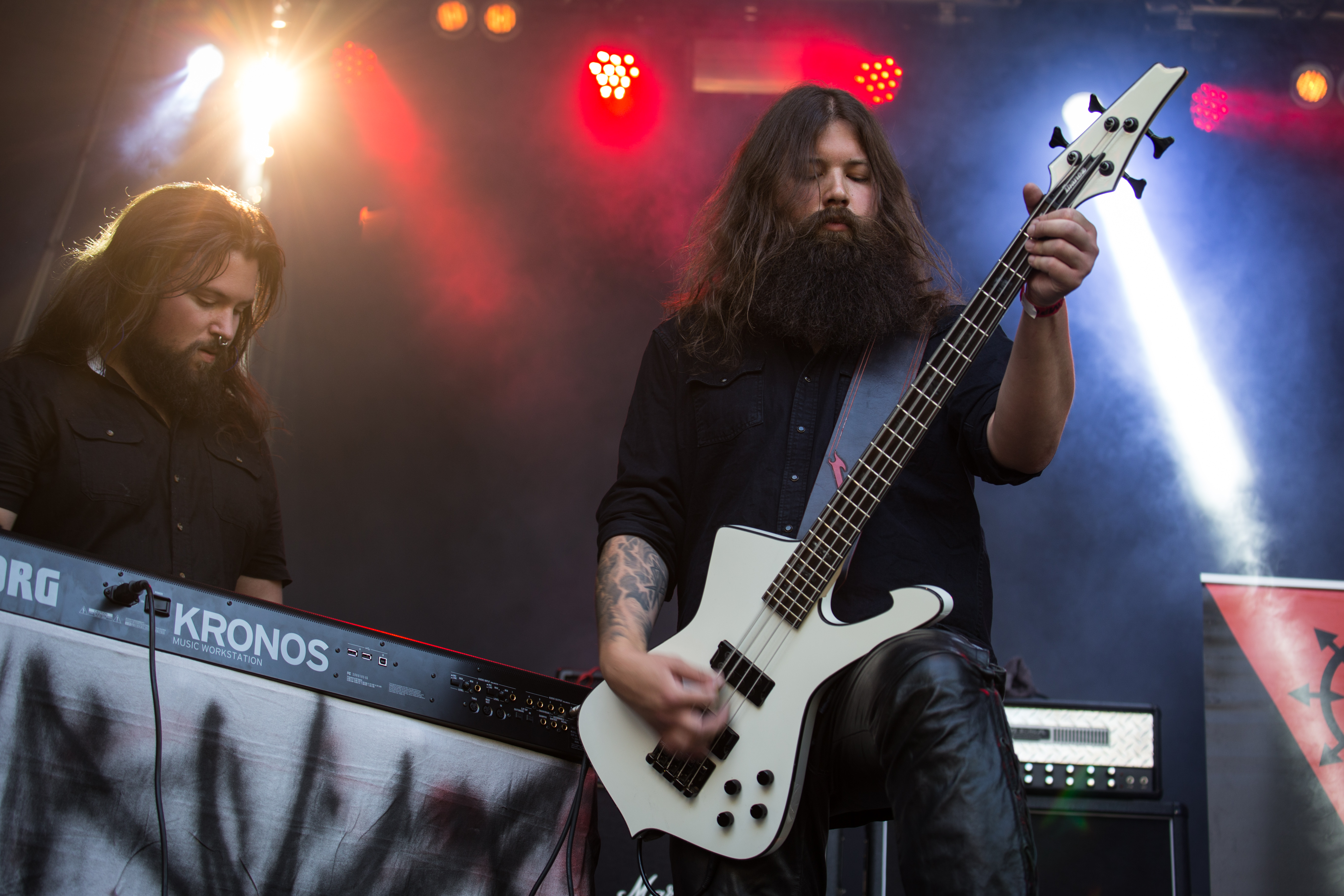
- Loch Vostok performing live at Turock Open Air, Essen 2015

Background information
- Origin: Uppsala, Sweden
- Genre: Progressive metal
- Years active: 2001–present
- Labels: ViciSolum Productions, Nightmare Records, Escapi Music, Magnetism
- Members: Teddy Möller; Niklas Kupper; Jimmy Mattsson; Lawrence Dinamarca; Fredrik Klingwall
- Past members: Erik Grandin; Andreas Lindahl; Sebastian Okupski; Mattias Hagberg; Alvaro Svanerö; Tomas "Tym" Jonsson
- Website: lochvostok.com

Loch Vostok is a progressive metal band from Uppsala, Sweden. Named after a subterranean lake in Antarctica, it rose from the collapse of the progressive metal band Mayadome in 2001.

== Biography ==
Loch Vostok was formed in 2001 by drummer Teddy Möller after the demise of his previous progressive metal band, Mayadome. Bringing along keyboardist Sebastian Okupski, bass player Erik Grandin, and new recruits guitarist Niklas Kupper and drummer Alvaro Svanerö, Möller switched roles from drums to lead singer and guitarist for the new band. However, Grandin couldn't relocate to the United States and was replaced by Tomas "Tym" Jonsson. Möller had played with him previously in Mellow Poetry.

Loch Vostok recorded a self-financed album with producer Daniel Bergstrand in 2002. The result was Dark Logic. An album where the lyrics were entirely based on infamous serial killers such as Henry Lee Lucas, Andrei Chikatilo and Ed Gein. The Russian distributor "CD-Maximum" was the first to pick up the album shortly after Magnetism Records released it officially worldwide in August 2004.

After the album's release, keyboard player Sebastian Okupski left Loch Vostok to focus on other projects. The vacancy was filled by Andreas Lindahl of Platitude. Due to the distance between Uppsala and Gothenburg, he left the band after recording the new album Destruction Time Again!.

In December 2005, keyboardist/composer Fredrik Klingwall of Flagellation, Anima Morte, etc., joined Loch Vostok. With Destruction Time Again! on their new label, Escapi Music, they hit the road supporting King Diamond in the Scandinavian leg of his European 2006 tour. With the album well received, Loch Vostok set out to do more gigs to support the album following the King Diamond tour in 2006 and 2007 with Pyramaze, Grave and Rotting Christ, as well as playing the 5-year anniversary of Headway Festival (A festival which they had also played in 2003) in Amsterdam.

In 2007, they also began the recordings of the follow-up to 2006 years Destruction Time Again! in Teddy's own Blueflame Studio, an album that came to be Reveal No Secrets, which was released in the summer of 2009. After this release, the band entered a kind of hibernation era, with Möller being very busy with his other band, F.K.Ü. Current drummer Svanerö decided to leave and was replaced by Lawrence Dinamarca. In 2011, the band signed a three-album deal with Vicisolum Productions and released the critically acclaimed Dystopium, shortly followed by a tour with Therion and Leprous. Tomas "Tym" Jonsson decided to leave the band before the tour due to complications with a herniated spine and was replaced on bass by Jimmy Mattsson of Planet Rain.

A year later, the fifth album, V: The Doctrine Decoded, was announced and furthermore released on 4 October 2012.

== Members ==
=== Current members ===
- Teddy Möller – vocals/guitar (2000-2019)
- Niklas Kupper – guitar/backing vocals (2001–2009) and (2011–)
- Patrik Janson – bass (2018–)
- Lawrence Dinamarca – drums (2010–)
- Fredrik Klingwall - keyboard (2005-2015, 2016-)
- Jonas Radehorn - vocals (2019-)

=== Former members ===
- Erik Grandin – bass (2001–2002)
- Sebastian Okupski – keyboard (2001–2004)
- Andreas Lindahl – keyboard (2004–2005)
- Alvaro Svanerö – drums (2001–2009)
- Tomas "Tym" Jonsson – bass (2002–2010)
- Mano Lewys – guitar (2010–2011)
- Mattias Hagberg – keyboard, backing vocals (2015–2016)
- Jimmy Mattsson - bass (2010-2018)

== Discography ==
- Dark Logic (2004)
- Destruction Time Again! (2006)
- Reveal No Secrets (2009)
- Dystopium (2011)
- V - The Doctrine Decoded (2012)
- From These Waters (2015)
- Strife (2017)
- Opus Ferox – The Great Escape (2021)
- Opus Ferox II – Mark of the Beast (2024)
