= Jens Bogren =

Swedish record producer (born 1979)

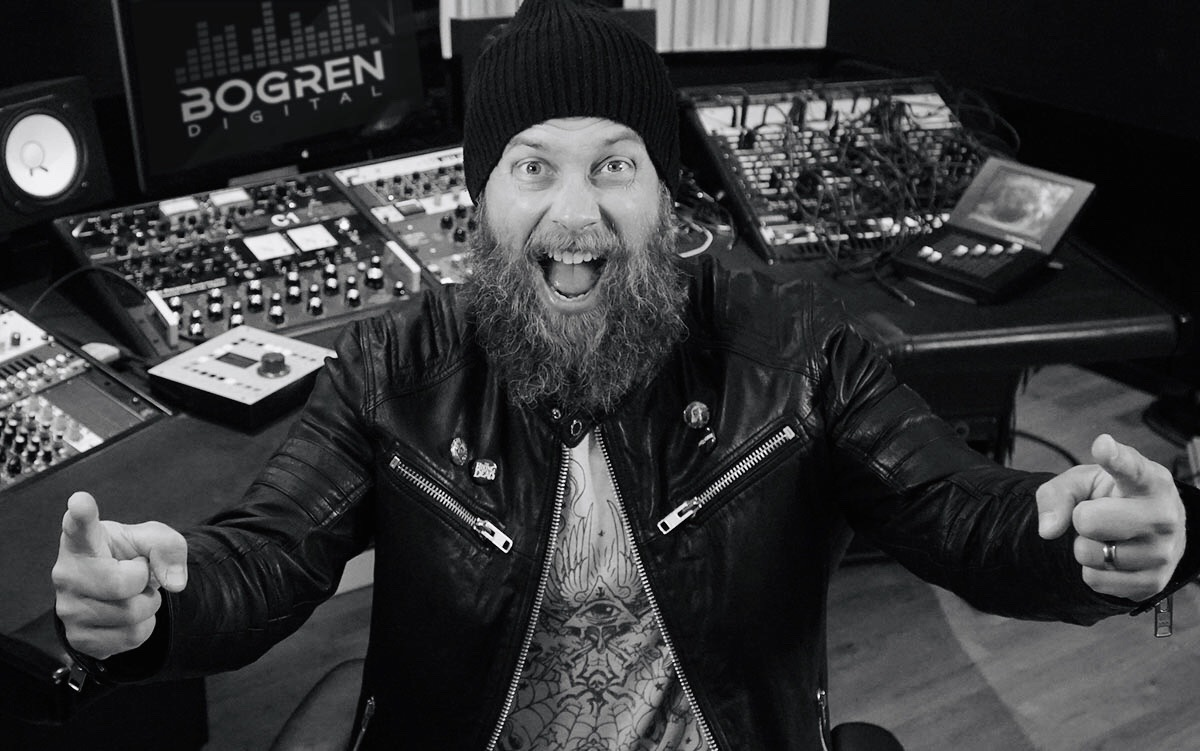

Background information
- Born: 13 November 1979 (age 46)
- Occupations: Record producer; sound engineer
- Years active: 2001–present

Jens Peter Daniel Bogren (born 13 November 1979) is a Swedish record producer, mixer and recording engineer specializing in heavy metal music. He has worked on albums by Opeth, Dimmu Borgir, Sepultura, Arch Enemy, At the Gates, Katatonia, Babymetal, Soilwork, James LaBrie, Moonspell, God Forbid, Kreator, Devin Townsend, Ihsahn, Dark Tranquillity, Paradise Lost, Amon Amarth, DragonForce, The Ocean, Haken, Between the Buried and Me, Rotting Christ, Symphony X, Myrath, Angra, Dir En Grey, and Powerwolf, amongst others. Bogren lives in Örebro, Sweden and runs both Fascination Street Studios and Bogren Digital.

== Other ventures ==
Bogren is the co-founder of Bogren Digital, a music software company that develops audio plug-ins and virtual instruments based on his production work. Through Bogren Digital, he has collaborated with artists including Trivium, Dimmu Borgir, Dååth, and Slipknot on signature virtual instruments and plug-ins.

He has an educational course with URM Academy titled How It’s Done w/ Jens Bogren, in which he demonstrates his production process by recording and mixing a song with Ihsahn of Emperor.

Bogren has also appeared multiple times on Nail The Mix, where he has deconstructed mixes for artists such as Opeth, Amon Amarth and Between the Buried and Me.

== Discography ==
| Release year | Artist | Album | Role |
|---|---|---|---|
| 2003 | Katatonia | Viva Emptiness | Mixing |
| 2004 | Dionysus | Anima Mundi | Producer, recording and mixing |
| 2004 | Bloodbath | Nightmares Made Flesh | Producer, engineering |
| 2004 | Pain of Salvation | BE | Producer, mixing |
| 2005 | Opeth | Ghost Reveries | Producer, engineering, mixing and mastering |
| 2005 | Soilwork | Stabbing the Drama | Engineering (additional) |
| 2006 | Daylight Dies | Dismantling Devotion | Mixing |
| 2006 | Katatonia | The Great Cold Distance | Producer, engineering, mixing and mastering |
| 2006 | Dionysus | Fairytales and Reality | Producer, recording and mixing |
| 2006 | Amon Amarth | With Oden on Our Side | Producer, engineering and mixing |
| 2007 | Pain of Salvation | Scarsick | Producer, mixing (assistant) and mastering |
| 2007 | Oceans of Sadness | Mirror Palace | Mixing |
| 2007 | Symphony X | Paradise Lost | Mixing |
| 2007 | InMe | Daydream Anonymous | |
| 2008 | Eluveitie | Slania | Producer, recording, mixing and mastering |
| 2008 | Draconian | Turning Season Within | Mixing and mastering |
| 2008 | Ihsahn | angL | Engineering |
| 2008 | Daylight Dies | Lost to the Living | Mixing and mastering |
| 2008 | Universum | Leto Destinatus | Mixing and mastering |
| 2008 | Opeth | Watershed | Producer, recording, mixing and mastering |
| 2008 | Opeth | Still Life DVD re-release | Mixing |
| 2008 | Paradise Lost | The Anatomy of Melancholy | Mixing and mastering |
| 2008 | Amon Amarth | Twilight of the Thunder God | Producer, engineering, mixing and mastering |
| 2008 | Oceans of Sadness | The Arrogance of Ignorance | Producer, mixing and mastering |
| 2009 | God Forbid | Earthsblood | Mixing and mastering |
| 2009 | Paradise Lost | Faith Divides Us – Death Unites Us | Producer, mixing and mastering |
| 2009 | Homem Mau | Pelo Lado de Dentro | |
| 2009 | Gwyllion | The Edge of All I Know | Producer, mixing and mastering |
| 2009 | Katatonia | Night Is the New Day | Mastering |
| 2009 | Lion's Share | Dark Hours | Mixing and mastering |
| 2009 | Swallow the Sun | New Moon | Producer, engineering, recording, mixing and mastering |
| 2009 | Iron Mask | Shadow of the Red Baron | Mixing and mastering |
| 2010 | Ihsahn | After | Mixing and mastering |
| 2010 | Soilwork | The Panic Broadcast | Mixing and engineering |
| 2010 | Pain of Salvation | Road Salt One | Mastering (track 3) |
| 2010 | Slechtvalk | A Forlorn Throne | Mixing and mastering |
| 2010 | James LaBrie | Static Impulse | Mixing and mastering |
| 2010 | Dimenssion | Mundo Diablo | |
| 2010 | Enslaved | Axioma Ethica Odini | Mixing |
| 2010 | Creation's Tears | Methods to End It All | Co-producer, mixing and mastering |
| 2011 | Universum | Mortuus Machina | Mixing and mastering |
| 2011 | Amon Amarth | Surtur Rising | Producer, recording, mixing and mastering |
| 2011 | Lake of Tears | Illwill | Mastering |
| 2011 | Compilation | Småstadshjärtan | |
| 2011 | Chaos Divine | The Human Connection | Mixing and mastering |
| 2011 | Myrath | Tales of the Sands | Mastering |
| 2011 | Alpine Fault | Iraena's Ashes | Mastering |
| 2011 | Symphony X | Iconoclast | Mixing and mastering |
| 2011 | Voyager | The Meaning of I | Mixing and mastering |
| 2011 | Draconian | A Rose for the Apocalypse | Co-producer, recording, mixing and mastering |
| 2011 | The Devin Townsend Project | Deconstruction | Mixing |
| 2011 | Leprous | Bilateral | Mixing and mastering |
| 2011 | Opeth | Heritage | Engineering |
| 2011 | Vildhjarta | Måsstaden | Mastering |
| 2012 | Borknagar | Urd | Mixing and mastering |
| 2012 | God Forbid | Equilibrium | Mixing and mastering |
| 2012 | Ihsahn | Eremita | Mixing and mastering |
| 2012 | Be'lakor | Of Breath and Bone | Mixing and mastering |
| 2012 | Kreator | Phantom Antichrist | Producer, engineering and mixing |
| 2012 | Ne Obliviscaris | Portal of I | Mixing and mastering |
| 2012 | Enslaved | RIITIIR | Mixing |
| 2012 | Daylight Dies | A Frail Becoming | Mixing and mastering |
| 2012 | Paradise Lost | Tragic Idol | Producer and mixing |
| 2012 | The HAARP Machine | Disclosure | Mastering |
| 2012 | The Safety Fire | Grind the Ocean | Mastering |
| 2012 | Obsidian Kingdom | Mantiis | Mastering |
| 2012 | Witchcraft | Legend | Producer |
| 2012 | Headspace | I Am Anonymous | |
| 2013 | Rotting Christ | Κατά τον δαίμονα εαυτού / Kata Ton Daimona Eaytoy (Do What Thou Wilt) | Mixing and mastering |
| 2013 | Orphaned Land | All Is One | Mixing and mastering |
| 2013 | Until Rain | Anthem To Creation | Mixing and mastering |
| 2013 | Soilwork | The Living Infinite | Producer, mixing and mastering |
| 2013 | In Vain | Ænigma | Mixing |
| 2013 | Dark Tranquillity | Construct | Mixing and mastering |
| 2013 | Eyesburn | Reality Check | Mastering |
| 2013 | Embion | L8NC | Mastering |
| 2013 | Leprous | Coal | Mixing |
| 2013 | Lux Aeterna | Echoes from Silence | Mastering |
| 2013 | Kalmah | Seventh Swamphony | Mixing and mastering |
| 2013 | Extol | Extol | Mixing and mastering |
| 2013 | James LaBrie | Impermanent Resonance | Mixing |
| 2013 | Haken | The Mountain | Mixing and mastering |
| 2013 | Primitivity | Evolution | |
| 2013 | Ihsahn | Das Seelenbrechen | Mixing and mastering |
| 2013 | The Ocean | Pelagial | Producer, mixing and mastering |
| 2013 | Mechanigod | Realms | Mastering |
| 2013 | Daydream XI | The Grand Disguise | Co-producer and mastering |
| 2013 | Parasite Inc. | Time Tears Down | Mastering |
| 2013 | Domine Nation | Titans' Rise | Mixing |
| 2013 | Omb | SwineSong | Mastering |
| 2013 | Tria Mera | Extinction EP | Mastering |
| 2014 | DragonForce | Maximum Overload | Producer and mixing |
| 2014 | Marty Friedman | Inferno | Mixing |
| 2014 | Arch Enemy | War Eternal | Mixing and mastering |
| 2014 | Total Death | Inmerso en la Sangre | Mastering |
| 2014 | Haken | Restoration | Mixing and mastering |
| 2014 | At the Gates | At War with Reality | Mixing and mastering |
| 2014 | Derivate | Derivate (EP) | Mastering |
| 2014 | Ne Obliviscaris | Citadel | Mixing and mastering |
| 2014 | Angra | Secret Garden | Producer and mixing |
| 2014 | Triosphere | The Heart of the Matter | Mixing and mastering |
| 2014 | Scribe | Hail Mogambo | Mastering |
| 2015 | Mokoma | Elävien kirjoihin | Mixing |
| 2015 | Moonspell | Extinct | Producer, mixing and mastering |
| 2015 | Kontinuum | Kyrr | Mastering |
| 2015 | Enslaved | In Times | Mixing |
| 2015 | Leprous | The Congregation | Mixing |
| 2015 | Between the Buried and Me | Coma Ecliptic | Mixing |
| 2015 | Solstice Coil | Commute | Mixing |
| 2015 | Silent Line | Shattered Shores | Mastering |
| 2015 | Powerwolf | Blessed & Possessed | Mastering |
| 2015 | Symphony X | Underworld | Mixing and mastering |
| 2015 | Soilwork | The Ride Majestic | Mixing and mastering |
| 2015 | Amorphis | Under the Red Cloud | Producer, engineering, mixing and mastering |
| 2015 | Dark Symphonica | Immersion | Mastering |
| 2015 | Caligula's Horse | Bloom | Mastering |
| 2015 | Earthside | A Dream In Static | Mixing and mastering (tracks 1, 6, 7) |
| 2015 | Draconian | Sovran | Mixing and mastering |
| 2016 | Borknagar | Winter Thrice | Mixing and mastering |
| 2016 | Hiranya | Breathe In | Mastering |
| 2016 | Fleshgod Apocalypse | King | Mixing and mastering |
| 2016 | Rotting Christ | Rituals | Mixing and mastering |
| 2016 | Myrath | Legacy | Mixing |
| 2016 | Babymetal | Metal Resistance | Mixing |
| 2016 | Ihsahn | Arktis | Mixing and mastering |
| 2016 | Haken | Affinity | Mixing and mastering |
| 2016 | Pain of Salvation | Remedy Lane Re:Visited | Remixing and remastering |
| 2016 | Fates Warning | Theories of Flight | Mixing |
| 2016 | Sinsaenum | Echoes of the Tortured | Mixing and mastering |
| 2016 | Stam1na | Elokuutio | Mixing and mastering |
| 2016 | Vola | Inmazes | Mastering |
| 2016 | Nick Johnston | Remarkably Human | Mastering |
| 2016 | KYROS | Vox Humana | Mastering |
| 2016 | Dark Tranquillity | Atoma | Mastering |
| 2016 | Trees of Eternity | Hour of the Nightingale | Producer, mixing and mastering |
| 2016 | Katatonia | The Fall of Hearts | Mixing and mastering |
| 2017 | Sepultura | Machine Messiah | Producer, recording, mixing and mastering |
| 2017 | Kreator | Gods of Violence | Producer, recording and mixing |
| 2017 | Replacire | Do Not Deviate | Mastering |
| 2017 | Leprous | Malina | Mixing |
| 2017 | Ex Deo | The Immortal Wars | Mixing and mastering |
| 2017 | Enslaved | E | Mixing |
| 2017 | Persefone | Aathma | Mixing and mastering |
| 2017 | Soul Enema | Of Clans and Clones and Clowns | Mixing and mastering |
| 2017 | Stonelayer | Stonelayer | Mastering |
| 2017 | Replacire | Do Not Deviate | Mastering |
| 2017 | DragonForce | Reaching into Infinity | Producer and mixing |
| 2017 | Daydream XI | The Circus of the Tattered and Torn | Mixing Feedback and Mastering |
| 2017 | Marty Friedman | Wall of Sound | Mixing |
| 2017 | Septicflesh | Codex Omega | Co-producer, mixing and mastering |
| 2017 | Arch Enemy | Will to Power | Mixing and mastering |
| 2017 | Caligula's Horse | In Contact | Mastering |
| 2017 | Prospekt | The Illuminated Sky | Mastering |
| 2017 | Dark Embrace | The Call Of The Wolves | Mastering |
| 2018 | In Vain | Currents | Mixing and mastering |
| 2018 | Angra | ØMNI | Producer, recording and mixing |
| 2018 | Orphaned Land | Unsung Prophets & Dead Messiahs | Mixing |
| 2018 | Amorphis | Queen of Time | Producer, recording and mixing |
| 2018 | Between the Buried and Me | Automata I, Automata II | Mixing and mastering |
| 2018 | Ihsahn | Ámr | Mastering |
| 2018 | Dimmu Borgir | Eonian | Co-producer, engineering and mixing |
| 2018 | Sunless Dawn | Timeweaver | Mastering |
| 2018 | Powerwolf | The Sacrament of Sin | Producer, engineering, recording and mixing |
| 2018 | Purest of Pain | Solipsis | Mastering |
| 2018 | Acod | The Divine Triumph | Mastering |
| 2018 | The Ocean | Phanerozoic I: Palaeozoic | Producer and mixing |
| 2019 | Swallow the Sun | When a Shadow Is Forced into the Light | Mixing |
| 2019 | Soen | Lotus | Mastering |
| 2019 | Rotting Christ | The Heretics | Mixing |
| 2019 | Myrath | Shehili | Mixing and mastering (select tracks only) |
| 2019 | Anthem | Nucleus | mixing and mastering |
| 2019 | Arch/Matheos | Winter Ethereal | Mixing |
| 2019 | Eluveitie | Ategnatos | Mixing |
| 2019 | Abandon Time | Pendulum | Mastering |
| 2019 | Taken | Unchained | Mastering |
| 2019 | Dead Joker | Ambiviolent | Mastering |
| 2019 | Suicidal Angels | Years of Aggression | Mixing |
| 2019 | Disillusion | The Liberation | Mastering |
| 2019 | Exhorder | Mourn the Southern Skies | Mixing and mastering |
| 2019 | Borknagar | True North | Mixing and mastering |
| 2019 | Total Death | La Noche Oscura del Alma | Mastering |
| 2019 | Wilderun | Veil of Imagination | Mastering |
| 2019 | Acid Reign | The Age Of Entitlement | Mastering |
| 2019 | Insomnium | Heart Like a Grave | Mixing and mastering |
| 2019 | Carcariass | Planet Chaos | Mastering |
| 2020 | Loathe | I Let It In and It Took Everything | Mastering |
| 2020 | Sepultura | Quadra | Producer, recording and mixing |
| 2020 | Psychotic Waltz | The God-Shaped Void | Mixing and mastering |
| 2020 | FERVENT | REBIRTH | Mastering |
| 2020 | Caligula's Horse | Rise Radiant | Mixing and mastering |
| 2020 | Ensiferum | Thalassic | Mixing and mastering |
| 2020 | Omega Diatribe | Metanoia | Mastering |
| 2020 | The Ocean | Phanerozoic II: Mesozoic / Cenozoic | Producer and mixing |
| 2020 | Enslaved | Utgard | Mixing |
| 2020 | Dark Tranquility | Moment | Mixing and mastering |
| 2021 | Marty Friedman | Tokyo Jukebox 3 | Mixing |
| 2021 | Dordeduh | Har | Mastering |
| 2021 | Between the Buried and Me | Colors II | Mixing |
| 2021 | Powerwolf | Call of the Wild | Mixing and mastering |
| 2021 | At the Gates | The Nightmare of Being | Producer, recording, mixing and mastering |
| 2021 | Spiritbox | Eternal Blue | Mastering |
| 2021 | Be'lakor | Coherence | Mixing |
| 2021 | Omnium Gatherum | Origin | Mixing |
| 2021 | Swallow the Sun | Moonflowers | Mixing |
| 2021 | 褪色 (Return to Innocence) | 褪色 (Return to Innocence) EP | Mastering |
| 2021 | Mire | A New Found Rain | Mixing and mastering |
| 2022 | Wilderun | Epigone | Mixing |
| 2022 | Amorphis | Halo | Producer and mixing |
| 2022 | Amon Amarth | "Put Your Back into the Oar" | Producer, recording and mixing |
| 2022 | Animals as Leaders | Parrhesia | Mastering |
| 2022 | The Halo Effect | Days of the Lost | Mixing |
| 2022 | Monuments | In Stasis | Mastering |
| 2022 | Ibaraki (茨木) | Rashomon (羅生門) | Mixing and mastering |
| 2022 | James LaBrie | A Beautiful Shade of Grey | Mastering |
| 2022 | Septicflesh | Modern Primitive | Co-producer, engineering, mixing and mastering |
| 2022 | Thornhill | Heroine | Mastering |
| 2022 | April Weeps | Cataclastic | Mastering |
| 2022 | Belphegor | The Devils | Producer, mixing and mastering |
| 2022 | Revocation | Netherheaven | Mixing and mastering |
| 2022 | Disillusion | Ayam | Mixing |
| 2022 | Scalpel | Century in the Boilpit | Mastering |
| 2023 | Anthem | Crimson & Jet Black | Producer, mixing and mastering |
| 2023 | Haken | Fauna | Mixing |
| 2023 | Enslaved | Heimdal | Mixing, Atmos mixing |
| 2023 | The Halo Effect | "Path of Fierce Resistance" | Mixing |
| 2023 | Crypta | Shades of Sorrow | Mastering |
| 2023 | Breakkaway | "I'll See You When the Night Comes" | Mastering, Mixing Assistant |
| 2023 | Omnium Gatherum | Slasher (EP) | Mixing |
| 2023 | breakk.away | "OUTSIDE" | Mastering, Atmos mixing |
| 2023 | Extol | Labyrinth of Ill / Exigency (EP) | Mixing and mastering |
| 2023 | The Halo Effect | "The Defiant One" | Mixing |
| 2023 | Monuments | "Nefarious" | Mastering |
| 2023 | Lamia Antitheus | Story of a Vampire | Mixing and mastering |
| 2024 | The Halo Effect | "Become Surrender" | Mixing |
| 2024 | Ihsahn | Ihsahn | Mixing |
| 2024 | Borknagar | Fall | Mixing |
| 2024 | Suicidal Angels | Profane Prayer | Mixing |
| 2024 | Exhorder | Defectum Omnium | Mixing and mastering |
| 2024 | Ivory Tower | Heavy Rain | Mixing |
| 2024 | In Vain | Solemn | Mixing and mastering |
| 2024 | Dååth | The Deceivers | Mixing |
| 2024 | Trivium | "Ember to Inferno" (Re-recorded) | Mixing |
| 2024 | Rotting Christ | Pro Xristou | Mixing |
| 2024 | Shrapnel | In Gravity | Producer, mixing and mastering |
| 2024 | Replacire | The Center That Cannot Hold | Mixing and mastering |
| 2024 | Dark Tranquillity | Endtime Signals | Mixing and mastering |
| 2024 | Ensiferum | Winter Storm | Mixing and mastering |
| 2025 | The Halo Effect | March of the Unheard | Mixing |
| 2025 | Septicflesh | Amphibians (EP) | Producer |
| 2025 | Dynazty | Game of Faces | Mixing |
| 2025 | Arch Enemy | Blood Dynasty | Producer, mixing, vocals (choirs) |
| 2025 | Eluveitie | Ànv | Producer, mixing |
| 2025 | Behemoth | The Shit Ov God | Engineering (drums), mixing and mastering |
| 2025 | Haken | Liveforms: An Evening with Haken | Mixing and mastering |
| 2025 | The Haunted | Songs of Last Resort | Mixing and mastering |
| 2025 | Between the Buried and Me | The Blue Nowhere | Mixing |
| 2025 | Mors Principium Est | Darkness Invisible | Mixing |
| 2025 | Revocation | New Gods, New Masters | Mixing and mastering |
| 2025 | Testament | Para Bellum | Mixing |
| 2025 | Coroner | Dissonance Theory | Mixing and mastering |
| 2025 | Omnium Gatherum | May the Bridges We Burn Light the Way | Producer, mixing |
| 2026 | Kreator | Krushers of the World | Producer, mixing |
| 2026 | 褪色 (Return to Innocence) | 决战时刻 (Decisive Battle Moment) | Mixing |
| 2026 | At the Gates | The Ghost of a Future Dead | Producer, recording, mixing |
| 2026 | Behemoth | I, Scvlptor (EP) | Engineer (drums: tracks 1 and 5), mixing and mastering (tracks 1-6) |
| 2026 | Sworn | Null Crowned the Infinite | Producer, mixing and mastering |
| 2026 | The Ocean | Solaris | Producer, mixing and mastering |
| 2026 | Iapetus | The Mother Void | Mixing |
| 2026 | Insomnium | Netherworlds | Mixing |
| 2026 | Mental Cruelty | Echoes of a Forlorn Land | Mixing and mastering |
| 2026 | Enslaved | Mið | Mixing |
| 2026 | Extol | Aura of Decay | Mixing and mastering |
