= Murder of Crows =

A murder of crows is the collective noun for a group of crows.

Murder of crows may refer to:

== Theater, film, television ==
- A Murder of Crows (film), 1999 American film
- Murder of Crows, a play written in 1992 by Mac Wellman
- "A Murder of Crows", a 2010 episode of season 29 of the American television series Nature about the current study of crows
- "A Murder of Crowes", the second episode of season 5 of the FX series Justified

== Music ==
- The Murder of Crows, a band comprising Gaelynn Lea and Alan Sparhawk
- A Murder of Crows (album), 2003 studio album by Deadsoul Tribe
- "A Murder of Crows", a song on Sum 41's 2016 album 13 Voices
- A Murder of Crows (album), 2025 studio album by Mick Jenkins

== Other ==
- A Murder of Crows, the second novel in The Junction Chronicles series by David Rotenberg
- Murder of Crows, the second book in the Others series by Anne Bishop
- A Murder of Crows, a collected edition of the comic Swamp Thing, written by Alan Moore
- Sword of the Stars: A Murder of Crows, a 2006 expansion to the video game Sword of the Stars

== See also ==
- A Crow Left of the Murder..., 2004 studio album by Incubus
- "Murder of Birds", opening track on Jesca Hoop's 2014 album Undress
- "A Murder of One", a 1993 song by Counting Crows
