= No Reply (album) =

Studio album by Daylight Dies
- Released: October 1, 2002
- Recorded: 2002
- Genre: Melodic death metal Doom metal
- Label: Relapse Records

Daylight Dies chronology
No Reply (2002)	Live at the Contamination Festival (2005)

Professional ratings
Review scores
Source	Rating
Allmusic	3/5 stars
BW&BK	8/10 stars
Rock Hard	7.5/10 stars

No Reply is the debut full-length album by Daylight Dies released by Relapse Records in 2002.

== Track listing ==
No.	Title	Length
1.	"The Line That Divides"	7:13
2.	"I Wait"	6:48
3.	"Hollow Hands"	6:08
4.	"Four Corners"	8:11
5.	"Unending Waves"	7:05
6.	"In the Silence"	7:08
7.	"Minutes Pass"	8:46
8.	"Back in the World"	3:10
9.	"Everything That Belongs"	6:44
Total length:		61:13

== Credits ==
- Guthrie Iddings – harsh vocals, piano (on track 8)
- Barre Gambling – guitars
- Egan O'Rourke – bass, clean vocals
- Jesse Haff – drums
