= Colliding Skies =

Studio album by Chaos Divine
- Released: 6 March 2015
- Recorded: Underground Studios, Perth
- Genre: Progressive metal
- Length: 56:39
- Label: Firestarter Music & Distribution
- Producer: Chaos Divine

Chaos Divine chronology
The Human Connection (2011)	Colliding Skies (2015)	Legacies (2020)

Professional ratings
Review scores
Source	Rating
Sputnikmusic	3/5 stars
Metal Storm	7.5/10 stars
Metal Temple	5/5 stars

Colliding Skies is the third studio album by Australian progressive metal band Chaos Divine. It was released on 6 March 2015 through Firestarter Music & Distribution.

== Track listing ==
No.	Title	Length
1.	"Landmines"	7:42
2.	"Badge Of Honour"	4:16
3.	"Painted With Grey"	4:24
4.	"Soldiers"	4:50
5.	"Symbiotic"	6:17
6.	"Tides"	5:17
7.	"Before The Dawn"	5:17
8.	"The Shepherd"	6:34
9.	"Mara"	5:53
10.	"With Nothing We Depart"	6:09
Total length:		56:39

== Personnel ==
Chaos Divine

- David Anderton - Vocals
- Ryan Felton - Guitar, keyboards, artwork, backing vocals on 'Soldiers'
- Simon Mitchell - Guitar, engineering
- Michael Kruit - Bass guitar
- Ben Mazzarol - Drums

Additional personnel

- Brody Simpson - Additional drum engineering, percussion
- Dylan Hooper - Saxophone on 'With Nothing We Depart'
- Troy Nababan, Andy Jones, Jon Mazzardis - Backing vocals on 'Soldiers'
- Forrester Savell - Mixing, mastering
