= The Human Connection =

Studio album by Chaos Divine
- Released: 25 March 2011
- Recorded: Underground Studios, Perth
- Genre: Progressive metal
- Length: 60:06
- Label: Firestarter Music & Distribution
- Producer: Chaos Divine

Chaos Divine chronology
Avalon (2008)	The Human Connection (2011)	Colliding Skies (2015)

Professional ratings
Review scores
Source	Rating
Sputnikmusic	4.5/5 stars
Metal Obsession	9.5/10 stars

The Human Connection is the second studio album Australian progressive metal band Chaos Divine. It was released on 25 March 2011 through Firestarter Music & Distribution.

== Track listing ==
No.	Title	Length
1.	"One Door"	6:17
2.	"At The Ringing Of The Siren"	5:02
3.	"The Beaten Path"	6:27
4.	"Chasing Shadows"	6:38
5.	"Beautiful Abyss"	6:43
6.	"Silence"	5:53
7.	"Invert Evolution"	4:39
8.	"Astral Plane"	6:12
9.	"No Road Home (Solastalgia)"	12:15
Total length:		60:06

== Personnel ==
Chaos Divine

- David Anderton - Vocals
- Ryan Felton - Guitar, keyboards, sampling, artwork
- Simon Mitchell - Guitar, engineering
- Michael Kruit - Bass guitar
- Ben Mazzarol - Drums

Additional personnel

- Jens Bogren - Mixing, mastering
- Troy Nababan - Assistant engineering
- James Hewgill - Additional post-production
