= Time Tears Down =

Studio album by Parasite Inc.
- Released: 2 August 2013
- Genre: Melodic death metal
- Length: 47:20
- Label: Good Damn Records

Time Tears Down is the first full-length studio album by the German melodic death metal band Parasite Inc. It was released on 2 August 2013 via Good Damn Records (now Rebel Tune Records).

== Background ==
Time Tears Down was recorded in the band's own recording-studio. Sound engineering and mixing was done by the band itself. The album was mastered by Jens Bogren in the Fascination Street Studios. The band re-recorded all eight songs from their 2010 demo album for this album with the exception of the intro and an interlude. The bonus song "Deadlife" was released on physical copies only and is the oldest song written by the band, although never released before.

== Reception ==
The album received positive reviews and high ratings by leading German metal magazines. It reached number 26 in the official German rock-metal charts and stayed several weeks in the top 30. The music video for the song "The Pulse of the Dead" on YouTube was also successful.

== Track listing ==
No.	Title	Length
1.	"Fire the Machines"	1:05
2.	"Back for War"	2:27
3.	"Time Tears Down"	4:17
4.	"Chaos Inside"	3:43
5.	"Function or Perish"	4:39
6.	"Armageddon in 16 to 9"	4:14
7.	"The Pulse of the Dead"	4:11
8.	"The Scapegoat"	3:42
9.	"In the Dark"	3:51
10.	"Unmeant Outcasts"	3:44
11.	"Hatefilled"	2:14
12.	"The End of Illusions"	5:45
Total length:		43:52

Physical Edition Bonus Track
No.	Title	Length
13.	"Deadlife"	3:28
Total length:		47:20

== Personnel ==
=== Parasite Inc. ===
- Kai Bigler – vocals, guitar
- Benjamin Stelzer– drums
- Kevin Sierra – guitar
- Stefan Krämer– bass

=== Production ===
- Mastering by Jens Bogren
