= No Need to Reason =

Studio album by Kontinuum
- Released: July 6, 2018
- Genre: Gothic rock
- Length: 46:52
- Label: Season Of Mist

Kontinuum chronology
Kyrr (2015)	No Need to Reason (2018)

No Need to Reason is the third album of Icelandic post-black metal band Kontinuum. It was released on 6 July 2018 through Season Of Mist.

Professional ratings
Review scores
Source	Rating
Metal Hammer	3.5/5
Metal Storm	8.5/10

== Tracklist ==
No.	Title	Length
1.	"Shivers"	4:20
2.	"Lifelust"	5:57
3.	"Warm Blood"	2:29
4.	"Neuron"	5:07
5.	"No Need to Reason"	4:11
6.	"Low Road"	5:02
7.	"Erotica"	3:43
8.	"Stargaze"	5:18
9.	"Two Moons"	5:43
10.	"Black Feather"	5:02
Total length:		46:52
