= Automata II =

Studio album by Between the Buried and Me
- Released: July 13, 2018
- Recorded: August–September 2017
- Studio: The Basement Studios, Winston-Salem, North Carolina
- Genre: Progressive metal; technical death metal
- Length: 33:12
- Label: Sumerian
- Producer: Jamie King, Between the Buried and Me

Between the Buried and Me chronology
Automata I (2018)	Automata II (2018)	Colors II (2021)

Automata II is the ninth studio album by the American progressive metal band Between the Buried and Me. It was released on July 13, 2018 through Sumerian Records, and it is the second part of a two-piece album, the first one being Automata I, which was released March 9, 2018.

== Background ==
On the release of the album, vocalist Tommy Giles Rogers Jr. stated:

Holding our tongues for 'Automata II' was challenging. We worked so hard on these songs and finally we get to release the other half of this material to the world! I think this is some of the best material we've ever released. It's a result of everything we’ve been striving for up to this point. There are plenty of twists/turns and bizarre moments, but there is also a lot of beauty in the music and the story. 'Automata' is now complete and our protagonist found his version of home and peace. We are all in this together.

Through his official Facebook page, Blake Richardson also talked about the album:

On a personal note, I am genuinely stoked for y’all too hear this part of the double album. We’ve been sitting on this material for a long time and it’s a great feeling for everyone to finally be able to check it out. There’s a track on here that’s like 13 minutes long and it’s THE SHIT. We got riffs, choruses, breakdowns, blasts, horns, drum solos [...]

Bassist Dan Briggs added:

'Automata II' sees us at our most dynamic and most creative. It feels like turning a page into a whole new terrain and us working all these years together to arrive at this point. It's quirky, adventurous, melodic, dark and full of theatrics.

== Critical reception ==
Professional ratings
Aggregate scores
Source	Rating
Metacritic	81/100
Review scores
Source	Rating
AllMusic	4/5 stars
Exclaim!	9/10
MetalSucks	4/5 stars
PopMatters	8/10 stars
The Prog Report	(positive)

Review aggregator Metacritic scored the album an 81 out of 100 based on four music critics, citing "universal acclaim".

Allmusic's Thom Jurek claimed that "Automata II can be listened to on its own, but it holds much greater power when taken together with its predecessor. It is easily the more musically adventurous of the two recordings, making it an indispensable part of Between the Buried and Me's provocative catalog.

Victor Giol of The Prog Report stated that "This will please both the longtime fans as well as new listeners; a very well done feather in BTBAM’s prog concept album cap. Automata is sure to be a top prog album of 2018".

== Track listing ==
All tracks are written by Between the Buried and Me.

No.	Title	Length
1.	"The Proverbial Bellow"	13:16
2.	"Glide"	2:13
3.	"Voice of Trespass"	7:58
4.	"The Grid"	9:45
Total length:		33:12

== Personnel ==
Between the Buried and Me

- Tommy Giles Rogers Jr. – vocals, keyboards
- Paul Waggoner – lead guitar
- Dustie Waring – rhythm guitar
- Dan Briggs – bass, keyboards
- Blake Richardson – drums

Additional musicians

- Cameron MacManus – baritone sax, trombone
- Jonathan Wiseman – trumpet

Production

- Jamie King – production, engineering, drum and piano engineering
- Kevin King – additional production
- Jens Bogren – mixing, mastering
- Kris Hilbert – drum and piano engineering

Management

- Nick "Biggie" Grimaldi (Good Fight Entertainment) – management
- Ash Avildsen and Nick Walters (Sumerian Records) – A&R
- Dave Shapiro and Tim Borror (The Agency Group) – North America booking
- Tom Taaffe (The Agency Group) – international booking
- Bryan K. Christner, Esq. – legal representation

Artwork

- Corey Meyers – art direction, layout, photography
- Aaron Strelecki and Andrew Strelecki – photography

== Charts ==
Chart (2018)	Peak position
Swiss Albums (Schweizer Hitparade)	69
US Billboard 200	65
US Independent Albums (Billboard)	1
US Top Rock Albums (Billboard)	3
