= Onwards (album) =

Studio album by Triosphere
- Released: 2006 (Norway, Japan); 2007 (United States, Europe)
- Genre: Heavy metal, power metal, progressive metal
- Label: Face Front; Plastic Head Distribution; Spiritual Beast
- Producer: Rune Stavnesli and Marius Silver Bergesen

Triosphere chronology
Deadly Decadence (2005)	Onwards (2006)	The Road Less Travelled (2010)

Singles from The Road Less Travelled
- 1. "Trinity" Released: 2006

Onwards is the first studio album from the Norwegian heavy metal band Triosphere. It was released in Norway in 2006 by FaceFront Records and the rest of Europe in 2007 by Plastic Head Distribution. The Japanese label Spiritual Beast released the album in Asia in 2006 and in the United States in 2007.

== Track listing ==
All lyrics are written by Ida Haukland except track 2 by Marius Silver Bergensen; all music is composed by Silver except track 7 and 8 by Silver/Haukland.

No.	Title	Length
1.	"Onwards Part I (All is Fair in Love and War?...)"	0:26
2.	"Onwards Part II (Decadent One)"	3:32
3.	"Trinity"	4:53
4.	"Lament"	3:45
5.	"Spitfire"	3:55
6.	"The Silver Lining"	4:32
7.	"Gunnin' for Glory"	3:51
8.	"Sunriser"	4:47
9.	"Twilight"	4:21
10.	"Onwards Part III (A Sole Twin’s Search in Solitude)"	6:13
11.	"Onwards Part IV (Retrospect, Moving Forwards in Reverse)"	7:06
Total length:		47:21

Japanese bonus tracks
No.	Title	Length
12.	"Onwards Part V (Towards a New Horizon)"	2:14
13.	"Mean Man" (W.A.S.P. cover)	3:56

== Reception ==
The album has received positive reviews from metal review sites and the specialized press. In August 2009, Onwards receives the award for Metal album of the Year from "Just Plain Folks Music Organization", world's largest independent music organization, in competition with more than 40.000 artists in all genres around the world.

Professional ratings
Review scores
Source	Rating
Encyclopaedia Metallum	78%
Heavymetal.no	9/10
Lords of Metal	77/100
The Metal Crypt	3.75/5
Pavillon 666	9.5/10
Spirit of Metal	17/20

== Personnel ==
=== Band members ===
- Ida Haukland - vocals and bass
- Marius Silver Bergesen - lead and rhythm guitars
- Ørjan Aare Jørgensen - drums

=== Additional personnel ===
- Arid Følstad - keyboards
- Ann Helen Samnsve - violin and viola
- Espen Godø - mellotron (on 8 and 9)
- Tommy Sebastian - male vocals (on 2 and 10)
- Pete Beck - backing vocals (on 4, 9 and 10) and tambourine
