= Deadsoul Tribe (album) =

Studio album by Deadsoul Tribe
- Released: 20 March 2002
- Genre: Progressive metal
- Length: 45:03
- Label: InsideOut Music

Deadsoul Tribe chronology
Deadsoul Tribe (2002)	A Murder of Crows (2003)

Deadsoul Tribe
Review scores
Source	Rating
MetalReviews.com	85/100

Deadsoul Tribe is the debut full-length studio album by the progressive metal band Deadsoul Tribe, released on 20 March 2002. The brief intro to "Powertrip" (before any instruments can be heard) is from the film, Fear and Loathing in Las Vegas. The sample heard in the middle of "One Bullet" is from the film, Young Frankenstein.

== Track listing ==
1. "Powertrip" − 3:28
2. "Coming Down" − 5:22
3. "Anybody There?" − 1:18
4. "The Haunted" − 4:52
5. "The Drowning Machine" − 3:09
6. "You" − 3:59
7. "Under the Weight of My Stone" − 1:42
8. "Once" − 4:50
9. "One Bullet" − 5:01
10. "Empty" − 1:02
11. "Cry for Tomorrow" − 4:10
12. "Into..." (Bonus Track) − 1:26
13. "...Into the Spiral Cathedral" (Bonus Track) − 4:44

== Credits ==
- Devon Graves − lead vocals, guitar, flute
- Roland Ivenz − bass
- Adel Moustafa − drums
- Volker Wilschko − rhythm guitar
