= The Road Less Travelled (Triosphere album) =

Studio album by Triosphere
- Released: May 28, 2010
- Recorded: 2010
- Genre: Heavy metal, power metal, progressive metal
- Length: 56:28
- Label: AFM Records
- Producer: Marius Silver Bergesen, Ida Haukland

Triosphere chronology
Onwards (2006)	The Road Less Travelled (2010)	The Heart Of The Matter (2014)

Singles from The Road Less Travelled
- 1. "Human Condition" Released: 2010

The Road Less Travelled is the second studio album by Norwegian heavy metal band Triosphere. It was released in 2010 by AFM Records. It is the first album to including new guitarist Tor Ole Byberg, with the band expanding into a quartet.

The album's style is different from its predecessor, Onwards, as it has a more melodic sound. "Echoes" is an all-piano and cello instrumental medley of the tracks 2 to 10. The Japanese edition also includes "Lawless", in tribute to Blackie Lawless, and a cover of the Guns N' Roses's song "Welcome to the Jungle". Guitarist Marius Silver Bergensenn wrote all instrumental parts, with vocal melodies and lyrics by singer and bassist Ida Haukland.

== Production ==
In July 2010, Ida Haukland said the new album "...is about daring to choose a path that, even though it might be unconventional or more challenging, nevertheless leads you towards your goal and ambitions."

The Road Less Travelled is produced by Silver and Haukland, making it the first disc of the band to be only produced by the band itself. This time, Silver is not credited for any lyrics, and Haukland for any music (except for all the vocal melodies). The album thanks includes the bands W.A.S.P., Arch Enemy and Kamelot and the singer Jørn Lande.

== Track listing ==
All lyrics are written by Ida Haukland; all music is composed by Marius Silver Bergensenn and Haukland except when noted^{1}.

No.	Title	Length
1.	"Ignition (Intro)" (Bergensenn)	1:59
2.	"Driven"	4:38
3.	"Human Condition"	4:36
4.	"Death of Jane Doe"	4:45
5.	"Marionette"	5:33
6.	"The Road Less Travelled"	5:26
7.	"The Anger and the Silent Remorse"	6:24
8.	"Watcher"	4:47
9.	"Twenty One"	4:49
10.	"Worlds Apart"	6:24
11.	"The Last Haven (Outro)" (Bergensenn)	2:16
12.	"Echoes" (Bergensenn; bonus track)	4:51
Total length:		56:28

Japanese bonus tracks
No.	Title	Length
13.	"Lawless (A Tribute to W.A.S.P.)"	6:01
14.	"Welcome to the Jungle" (Guns N' Roses cover; written by Guns N' Roses)	4:18

^{1}Bergensenn is credited solely for composing the music, but Haukland is credited for "lyrics and vocals melodies", meaning that she acted as composer for the vocals parts.

== Reception ==
Professional ratings
Review scores
Source	Rating
Blistering.com	8.5/10 stars
Dangerdog.com	5/5 stars
Funeral Rain	8/10 stars
Metal Forge	9.5/10 stars
Metal Underground	4/5 stars
Nightfall in Metal Earth	5/5 stars

Since its release, The Road Less Travelled has received very favourable reviews. Blistering.com gave the album a good review staging Triosphere were a "Smart, savvy, free-of-pretense progressive metal". The review went on to conclude "we’re looking at the future of power/progressive metal right in front of our faces".

Dangerdog Music Reviews stated the three ingredients of the album were "bulletproof chops, songwriting skill, and imagination" and "beyond recommended" the album, giving it the maximum rating. The Road Less Travelled was later choose as one of the fifteen Albums of the Year, with the site making it at the top of the internet page with the words "Complete and utter perfection. What more is there to say?".

== Personnel ==
=== Triosphere ===
- Ida Haukland - vocals and bass
- Marius Silver Bergesen - lead and rhythm guitar
- Tor Ole Byberg - rhythm guitar
- Ørjan Aare Jørgensen - drums

=== Additional personnel ===
- Espen Godø - keyboards and mellotron
- Kjell Magne Robak - cello on (4, 7, 8 and 12)
- Arild Følstad - piano (on 12)
- Erling Malm - backing vocals (on 5 and 6)
- Alessandro Elide - percussion (on 2 and 10)

=== Production ===
- Marius Silver Bergesen, Ida Haukland - production
- Tommy Hansen - mixing
