= Methods to End It All =

Studio album by Creation's Tears
- Released: 4 October 2010
- Genres: Gothic metal, alternative metal
- Length: 36:40
- Label: Cure for Poison Records
- Producers: Jens Bogren & David Castillo

Methods to End It All is the debut album by heavy metal band Creation's Tears who are based in Northern Ireland, with some members based in England. Methods to End It All has been referred to by journalist Malcolm Dome and producer Jens Bogren as belonging to the Gothic metal genre while others have drawn comparisons to Lacuna Coil, Within Temptation, Opeth, Paradise Lost, My Dying Bride and Anathema.

The band's personnel, fronted by singer/guitarist Brian Eddie Reynolds includes former members of established Heavy metal acts; Lee Morris ex Paradise Lost and guest female vocalist Sarah Jezebel Deva ex Cradle Of Filth. Methods to End It All would be the first Heavy Metal Music album to feature Lee Morris since his departure from Paradise Lost in 2004.

In a completely unexpected twist and just days before recording sessions for Methods to End It All commenced, bassist Ian Coulter announced he would be leaving Creation's Tears to concentrate on his new marriage. Coulter did however play bass on the band's Methods to End It All album.

Recording sessions for Methods to End It All commenced in January 2010. Creation's Tears employed three producers for different attributes of the recording. Ex Kill II This member Mark Mynett recorded the drums with Lee Morris in Huddersfield. Producers, Jens Bogren (Opeth, Katatonia, Soilwork, Amon Amarth) and David Castillo (Inme, Eluveitie, Katatonia) recorded all guitars at the famous Fascination Street Studio in Örebro with vocals and bass recorded at Ghost Ward Studios Stockholm where Katatonia recorded Night Is the New Day.

The debut Creation's Tears album Methods to End It All had initially been touted for a Spring 2010 release but following the band's vocalist Brian Eddie Reynolds contracting serious food poisoning during the recording sessions in Stockholm, the release was subsequently postponed. Reynolds would finish a small vocal section at his home studio in Ballymena.

Sarah Jezebel Deva ex Cradle Of Filth made a guest appearance on Methods to End It All track Creation's Tears.

Methods to End It All was eventually released on 4 October 2010 via Cure For Poison Records and distributed through Code 7 / Plastic Head distribution in UK & Republic of Ireland

== Track listing ==
All lyrics are written by Brian Eddie Reynolds; all music is composed by Brian Eddie Reynolds.

No.	Title	Length
1.	"Another Collision"	3:51
2.	"I Fail"	4:15
3.	"Creation's Tears (feat Sarah Jezebel Deva)"	3:03
4.	"Odyssey (OPUS IX)"	5:06
5.	"I'm Falling (You'll Never Know)"	2:54
6.	"Parody Paradigm"	4:46
7.	"The Last Tear Is Cried For Romance"	4:27
8.	"No Saviour Here"	3:46
9.	"Untimely Reminder"	4:27

== Credits ==
=== Personnel ===
- Brian Eddie Reynolds – vocals, guitars
- Ian Coulter – bass
- Lee Morris – session drums
- Sarah Jezebel Deva – guest vocals on "Creation's Tears"

=== Liner notes ===
- Produced by David Castillo with additional production by Jens Bogren & Brian EDDIE Reynolds.
- Mixed & Mastered by Jens Bogren at Fascination Street Studios, Örebro, Sweden, May–July 2010.
- Pre-production by Mark Mynett, Brian EDDIE Reynolds & Ian Coulter.
- Drums recorded & engineered by Mark Mynett at Blue Rooms, Hudders?field, England 15th – 17 January 2010.
- All guitars & (Vocals: Creation's Tears, Odyssey, No Saviour Here, I'm Falling) engineered & produced by David Castillo at Fascination Street Studios, Örebro, Sweden 21 Jan – 2 February 2010.
- Sarah Jezebel Deva's vocals recorded & engineered by Daniel Abela, Escape Route Studios, Essex, England 9 February 2010.
- Vocals (Another Collision, I Fail, Parody Paradigm, The Last Tear Is Cried For Romance, Untimely Reminder) & all bass engineered & produced by David Castillo at Ghost Ward Studio, Stockholm, Sweden 24th – 29 March 2010.
- Additional vocals on "Untimely Reminder" recorded & produced by Brian EDDIE Reynolds at Cure For Poison Studio, County Antrim, Northern Ireland.
- Front cover photo by Abigael Dani
- Additional cover photography by Brian EDDIE Reynolds.
- Album cover layout & design by Jonny Crozet & Laura Yabsley.
- All songs written & arranged by Brian EDDIE Reynolds.
- All lyrics written by Brian EDDIE Reynolds.
