= Legacies (album) =

Studio album by Chaos Divine
- Released: 16 October 2020
- Studios: Underground Studios and Hammerspace Studios, Perth
- Genre: Progressive metal
- Length: 62:17

Chaos Divine chronology
Colliding Skies (2015)	Legacies (2020)

Professional ratings
Review scores
Source	Rating
Metal Temple	10/10

Legacies is the fourth studio album by Australian progressive metal band Chaos Divine. It was released on 16 October 2020, five years after their previous album Colliding Skies. The single "Beacon" was released ahead of the album on 2 September 2020. The band celebrated the release of the album with a special live show in their home city of Perth.

== Track listing ==
No.	Title	Length
1.	"Instincts"	4:04
2.	"No Saviour (Rise & Fall)"	4:16
3.	"Unspoken"	4:57
4.	"Only Son"	3:40
5.	"Guarding Gravity"	5:09
6.	"Colours of War"	4:35
7.	"Beacon"	5:28
8.	"False Flags"	5:42
9.	"Dead Rivers Flow"	5:04
10.	"Behind the Seal"	4:55
11.	"The Key"	4:34
12.	"Legacies"	1:53
13.	"Into the Now"	8:00
Total length:		62:17

== Personnel ==
Chaos Divine

- David Anderton - vocals, lyrics
- Ryan Felton - guitar, backing vocals on "Behind the Seal"
- Simon Mitchell - guitar, recording and engineering
- Michael Kruit - bass
- Tim Stelter - drums

Additional personnel

- Brody Simpson - drum recording and engineering, percussion
- Troy Nababan - guitar/bass recording and engineering
- Forrester Savell - mixing, mastering
- Kat Atkinson - artwork
