= A Lullaby for the Devil =

Studio album by Deadsoul Tribe
- Released: 11 September 2007
- Genre: Progressive metal
- Length: 53:46
- Label: InsideOut Music

Deadsoul Tribe chronology
The Dead Word (2005)	A Lullaby for the Devil (2007)

A Lullaby for the Devil
Review scores
Source	Rating
Blabbermouth.net	7/10
Disagreement.net	10/10 stars
Metal.de	10/10 stars
MetalReviews.com	85/100
Metal Temple	8/10
Rock Hard	8/10

A Lullaby for the Devil is the fifth full-length studio album by the progressive metal band Deadsoul Tribe. It was released on 11 September 2007 by InsideOut Music. The initial pressing of the album will include a multimedia section with acoustic live material. The cover artwork is a hidden tribute to Ian Anderson of Jethro Tull, his typical pose with a flute from the 70s like a Pied-Piper (ratcatcher).

== Track listing ==
1. "Psychosphere" − 3:36
2. "Goodbye City Life" − 8:27
3. "Here Come the Pigs" − 4:01
4. "Lost in You" − 4:55
5. "A Stairway to Nowhere" − 6:35
6. "The Gossamer Strand" − 6:21
7. "Any Sign at All" − 6:17
8. "Fear" − 4:24
9. "Further Down" − 2:57
10. "A Lullaby for the Devil" − 6:13

== Credits ==
- Devon Graves − lead vocals, guitar, flute
- Roland Ivenz − bass
- Adel Moustafa − drums
- Roland Kerschbaumer − guitar
