= The God-Shaped Void =

Studio album by Psychotic Waltz
- Released: February 14, 2020
- Recorded: 2019
- Genre: Progressive metal
- Length: 58:51
- Label: Inside Out
- Producer: Ulrich Wild

Psychotic Waltz chronology
Bleeding (1996)	The God-Shaped Void (2020)

Singles from The God-Shaped Void
- 1. "Devils and Angels" Released: December 13, 2019; 2. "All the Bad Men" Released: January 24, 2020

The God-Shaped Void is the fifth studio album by American progressive metal band Psychotic Waltz, released on February 14, 2020. This is the band's first studio album since 1996's Bleeding.

== Track listing ==
The God-Shaped Void track listing
No.	Title	Length
1.	"Devils and Angels"	6:30
2.	"Stranded"	4:49
3.	"Back to Black"	3:53
4.	"All the Bad Men"	3:59
5.	"The Fallen"	5:49
6.	"While the Spiders Spin"	5:49
7.	"Pull the String"	4:54
8.	"Demystified"	5:13
9.	"Season of the Swarm (Bonus track)"	5:58
10.	"Sisters of the Dawn"	6:41
11.	"In the Silence"	5:16
Total length:		58:51

== Personnel ==
Psychotic Waltz

- Devon Graves – lead vocals, flute
- Dan Rock – guitars, keyboards
- Brian McAlpin – guitars
- Ward Evans – bass
- Norman Leggio – drums

Production

- Ulrich Wild – production
- Jens Bogren – mixing, mastering

== Charts ==
Sales chart performance for The God-Shaped Void
Chart (2020)	Peak position
German Albums (Offizielle Top 100)	9
Hungarian Albums (MAHASZ)	15
Swiss Albums (Schweizer Hitparade)	8

== See also ==
- List of 2020 albums
