= Lost to the Living =

Studio album by Daylight Dies
- Released: July 14, 2008
- Recorded: Volume 11 Studios; Techtronic Laboratories
- Genre: Death-doom, melodic death metal
- Label: Candlelight Records

Daylight Dies chronology
Dismantling Devotion (2006)	Lost to the Living (2008)	A Frail Becoming (2012)

Professional ratings
Review scores
Source	Rating
AllMusic	3.5/5 stars
Kerrang	4/5 stars
Metal Hammer	8/10 stars
Revolver	4/5 stars
Terrorizer	8/10 stars

Lost to the Living is the third full-length album by Daylight Dies and was to be released by Candlelight Records on June 24, 2008, but was delayed until July 14, 2008, due to problems with printing the album.

== Track listing ==
No.	Title	Length
1.	"Cathedral"	7:14
2.	"A Portrait in White"	5:02
3.	"A Subtle Violence"	5:40
4.	"And a Slow Surrender"	3:27
5.	"At a Loss"	6:26
6.	"Woke up Lost"	5:23
7.	"Descending"	5:20
8.	"Last Alone"	4:59
9.	"The Morning Light"	7:57
Total length:		51:28

== Credits ==
- Nathan Ellis – harsh vocals
- Barre Gambling – guitars
- Charley Shackelford – guitars
- Egan O'Rourke – bass, clean vocals, engineer
- Jesse Haff – drums

=== Session musicians ===
- Matthew Golombisky & Tomorrow Music Orchestra – strings, woodwinds

== Production ==
- Jens Bogren – mixing, mastering
- Travis Smith – layout
