= The Heart of the Matter (Triosphere album) =

The Heart Of The Matter

Studio album by Triosphere
- Released: 7 November 2014 (Europe); 2 December 2014 (US)
- Recorded: 2 October 2013 - September 2014
- Genres: Heavy metal, power metal, progressive metal
- Label: AFM Records
- Producers: Marius Silver Bergesen, Ida Haukland

Triosphere chronology
The Road Less Travelled (2010)	The Heart Of The Matter (2014)

The Heart of the Matter is the third studio album by Norwegian heavy metal band Triosphere, released on 7 November 2014. It is the last album with original drummer Ørjan Aare Jørgensen, who left prior to the release.

Described by Triosphere as "the most intense and the most fragile music the band as ever done", it took four years to be completed from the creative process to its final form, with a recording lasting almost an entire year. Following their usual songwriting method, all songs were composed by guitarist Marius Silver Bergensenn except for the melodies composed by vocalist and bassist Ida Haukland, who also wrote all the lyrics.

The album received widespread acclaim from critics, with much praise being given to its energy, composition, and Ida Haukland's vocals and lyrics. It was later voted Best Album of the Year by both Metalholic and Metal Pigeon.

== Production ==
Recording of the album started in October 2013, with Ørjan Aare Jørgensen recording his drums part from 2 to 10 October. His departure from the band was announced on 1 November 2013, although he continued to perform until 7 March 2014. Ida Haukland recorded her bass and then vocal parts in March 2014.

In August 2014, Espen Godø, who provided keyboards for Triosphere's two previous albums, recorded piano, mellotron and hammond for the upcoming album. On October 6, the band stated that string arrangements for new albums were almost complete. Chris Pettersen, who also supervised string arrangements for The Road Less Travelled, also participated on the new album.

Marius Silver Bergesen and Tor Ole Byberg finished the last two solos of the upcoming album on 7 November 2014. The album features two guest guitar soloists: Jørn Viggo Lofstad of Pagan's Mind (described as a "good friend of the band and one of the best players to ever come out of Norway") on "Relentless”, and Simone Mularoni of DGM on “The Sentinel”.

== Reception ==
Professional ratings
Review scores
Source	Rating
Dangerdog.com	4.5/5 stars
Grande Rock	8.5/10 stars
Metalholic	9.8 stars on a 10 point scale
The Metal Pigeon	(very positive)
Metal Storm	9/10 stars
Metal Underground	4.5/5 stars
PlanetMosh	5/5 stars

The Heart of the Matter has received very favourable reviews. Metal Storm gave a highly positive review, calling the album "timeless, yearning, nostalgic, and burning like a fire on the shoreline's edge that doesn't quit no matter how hard the waves crash", and concluding with "Mature in every way possible, yet with the enthusiasm of youthful hope and the biting mark of inner angst to keep us alive, Triosphere tears down the walls that so many would live eternally in."

Metalholic gave it a near-perfect rating of 9.8 out of 10, stating "The Heart of the Matter is a near perfect record–an auditory magnum opus. Triosphere’s members have combined to create a nearly flawless masterpiece of progressive metal tinged with power and traditional metal elements. Ida Haukland’s lyrical content feels like poetry; her voice powerful and emotive, adds depth and magic to every track. The songs on The Heart of the Matter are riveting and cinematic in scope. This is an album equally heavy and melodic, inspired and intelligent, diverse and dynamic." It was later voted album of the year by the site.

Metal Underground called the songwriting of The Heart of the Matter"fantastic" and "epic", and said it contained "some of the best riffs of the year", giving the album 4.5 out of 5. Describing the album as "a rather terrific and enjoyable album of melodic heavy metal", Dangerdog commented on the band's "superb sense of songwriting", with "an arsenal of weapons to draw from whether an abundance of catchy riffs, a strong melody, vocal harmony, notable rock groove, or sizzling leads."

In its Top Ten Albums of 2014 list, of which Triosphere was named number 1, The Metal Pigeon called the album "absolutely flawless and perfect in all aspects" [...] This is the best metal album of the year, regardless of subgenre, regardless of your preference for accessibility or extremity, and regardless of any preconceptions you might have about a female fronted metal band." He highly praised Haukland's vocals, describing her as "a sonically powerful vocalist with both high and low range, all while capably demonstrating a mastery of melody", as well as her and Silver's songwriting: "Together they weave a dark, stormy, and feverish take on progressive power metal that is both technically brilliant and emotionally resonant". The review was concluded by "an album with nothing to complain about and everything to get excited by, The Heart of the Matter is a beautiful, aggressive, elegantly chaotic masterpiece."

== Track listing ==
All lyrics are written by Ida Haukland; all music is composed by Marius Silver Bergensen and Haukland^{1}.

No.	Title	Length
1.	"My Fortress"	4:43
2.	"Steal Away the Light"	3:53
3.	"The Sentinel"	4:04
4.	"Breathless"	5:18
5.	"Departure"	4:46
6.	"The Heart's Dominion"	5:01
7.	"As I Call"	4:07
8.	"Relentless"	4:14
9.	"The Sphere"	4:37
10.	"Remedy"	5:29
11.	"Storyteller"	4:58
12.	"Virgin Ground"	3:09

^{1}Bergensenn is credited solely for composing the music, but Haukland is credited for "lyrics and vocals melodies", meaning that she acted as composer for the vocals parts.

== Personnel ==
Triosphere

- Ida Haukland - lead and backing vocals, bass
- Marius Silver Bergesen - lead and rhythm guitars
- Tor Ole Byberg - lead and rhythm guitars
- Ørjan Aare Jørgensen - drums

Additional musicians

- Espen Godø - piano, Mellotron, Hammond organ
- Jørn Viggo Lofstad - guitar solo on "Relentless"

Production

- Marius Silver Bergesen and Ida Haukland - production
- Jens Bogren - mixing, mastering
