= Primitivity =

American instrumental cello rock band

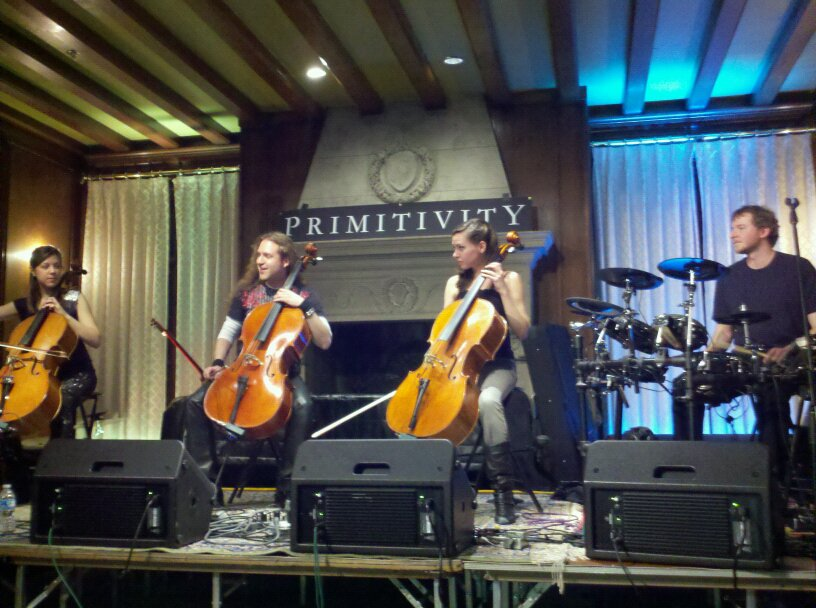

Background information
- Origin: Washington D.C., United States
- Genres: Cello rock, cello metal
- Years active: 2000 – present
- Labels: Independent
- Members: Loren Westbrook-Fritts, cello
- Past members: David Teie, cello Natalie Spehar, cello Devree Lewis, cello Kristin Ostling, cello Mauricio Betanzo, cello Kacy Clopton, cello Keith Thomas, cello Danny Villanueva, percussion Robby Burns, percussion
- Website: primitivity.com

Primitivity is an American instrumental cello rock band consisting of three cellists and a percussionist. Primitivity began primarily as a cover band playing songs by the thrash metal band Megadeth and the cello rock band Apocalyptica. The band has released one album entirely of Megadeth covers titled Plays Megadeth For Cello. Primitivity has also composed and performed original songs for cello rock ensemble. The group was selected as a 2010 Artist In Residence at Strathmore Hall in Bethesda, Maryland.

== History ==
Primitivity was originally formed in July 2000 and debuted on the NPR show From the Top while performing a cello arrangement of "Skin O My Teeth" by Megadeth. Primitivity recorded Plays Megadeth For Cello and performed with different lineups from 2002 to 2009 with lead cellist Loren Westbrook-Fritts. The band performed as a quintet from 2009–2010 until reforming in 2010 as a quartet with three cellos and a drummer. The latest lineup has performed covers of the Beatles, Led Zeppelin, AC/DC, Muse, Metallica, and System of a Down. The band released Evolution in 2013, which features all original music. The album is mastered by Jens Bogren, producer of metal bands Symphony X, DragonForce, and Opeth.

== Members ==
=== Current ===
- Loren Westbrook-Fritts – cello

== Discography ==
=== Plays Megadeth For Cello ===
- Released 24 February 2010

Plays Megadeth For Cello is the debut album by American rock cello group Primitivity, released in 2010. It features eight instrumental Megadeth covers arranged and played on cellos. The title similar to how Apocalyptica started playing Metallica covers from 1996's Plays Metallica by Four Cellos, but instead plays for their rival band instead.

1. "Skin o' My Teeth" – 3:18
2. "Symphony of Destruction" – 5:29
3. "Architecture of Aggression" – 3:13
4. "Foreclosure of a Dream" – 4:17
5. "Train of Consequences" – 3:30
6. "Addicted To Chaos" – 5:25
7. "A Tout le Monde" – 4:22
8. "Hangar 18" – 5:17

=== Evolution ===
- Released 16 October 2013

Evolution is the second album by the American rock cello group Primitivity, released in 2013. It features eleven original instrumental compositions.

1. "Sacrifice"
2. "Primitivity"
3. "Convergence"
4. "Ascend"
5. "Forgiven"
6. "Overdrive"
7. "Psycho Logic"
8. "Transcendence"
9. "Revival"
10. "Emergence"
11. "Prayer"

== See also ==
- Cello Rock
