= The January Tree =

Studio album by Deadsoul Tribe
- Released: 30 August 2004
- Genre: Progressive metal
- Length: 51:02
- Label: InsideOut Music

Deadsoul Tribe chronology
A Murder of Crows (2003)	The January Tree (2004)	The Dead Word (2005)

The January Tree is the third full-length studio album by the progressive metal band Deadsoul Tribe, released on 30 August 2004 by InsideOut Music.

== Reception ==
Blabbermouth rated the album six out of ten, noting "Much like its wintery theme, this album is cold, somewhat desolate and strangely attractive in some aspects." MusicOMH described it as "most certainly an album of two halves. Its second segment lacks the genius of the first, but it still provides a compelling, if slightly hit-and-miss performance."

== Track listing ==
No.	Title	Length
1.	"Spiders and Flies"	6:05
2.	"Sirens"	4:27
3.	"The Love of Hate"	3:42
4.	"Why?"	6:32
5.	"The Coldest Days of Winter"	3:32
6.	"Wings of Faith"	4:37
7.	"Toy Rockets"	5:31
8.	"Waiting for the Answer"	5:43
9.	"Just Like a Timepiece"	7:20
10.	"Lady of Rain"	3:31
Total length:		50:00

== Credits ==
- Devon Graves − lead vocals, guitar, flute
- Roland Ivenz − bass
- Adel Moustafa − drums
- Roland Kerschbaumer − rhythm guitar
- Volker Wilschko − guitar
