= Avalon (Chaos Divine album) =

Studio album by Chaos Divine
- Released: 12 September 2008
- Recorded: Sing Sing Studios, Melbourne; Felton/Mitchell Studios, Perth
- Genre: Progressive metal
- Length: 48:58
- Label: Firestarter Music & Distribution
- Producer: Chaos Divine and Jarrad Hearman

Chaos Divine chronology
Ratio EP (2006)	Avalon (2008)	The Human Connection (2011)

Professional ratings
Review scores
Source	Rating
The Metal Forge	9/10 stars

Avalon is the debut studio album by Australian progressive metal band Chaos Divine. It was released on 12 September 2008 through Firestarter Music & Distribution.

== Track listing ==
No.	Title	Length
1.	"Contortion"	5:14
2.	"Our Delusion"	4:55
3.	"Refuse The Sickness"	5:07
4.	"Avalon"	5:25
5.	"Cages"	4:59
6.	"Brand New Eyes"	3:48
7.	"The Carnal Thirst"	6:55
8.	"Rapture"	5:35
9.	"Narcosis"	4:12
10.	"Alone In The Sky"	3:48
Total length:		48:58

== Personnel ==
Chaos Divine

- Dave Anderton - Vocals, keyboards
- Simon Mitchell - Guitar
- Ryan Felton - Guitar, keyboards, artwork
- Michael Kruit - Bass guitar
- Chris Mitchell - Drums

Additional personnel

- Jarrad Hearman - Producer, recording & mixing
- Joseph Carra - Mastering, compiling
