= Deadsoul Tribe =

Austrian progressive metal band

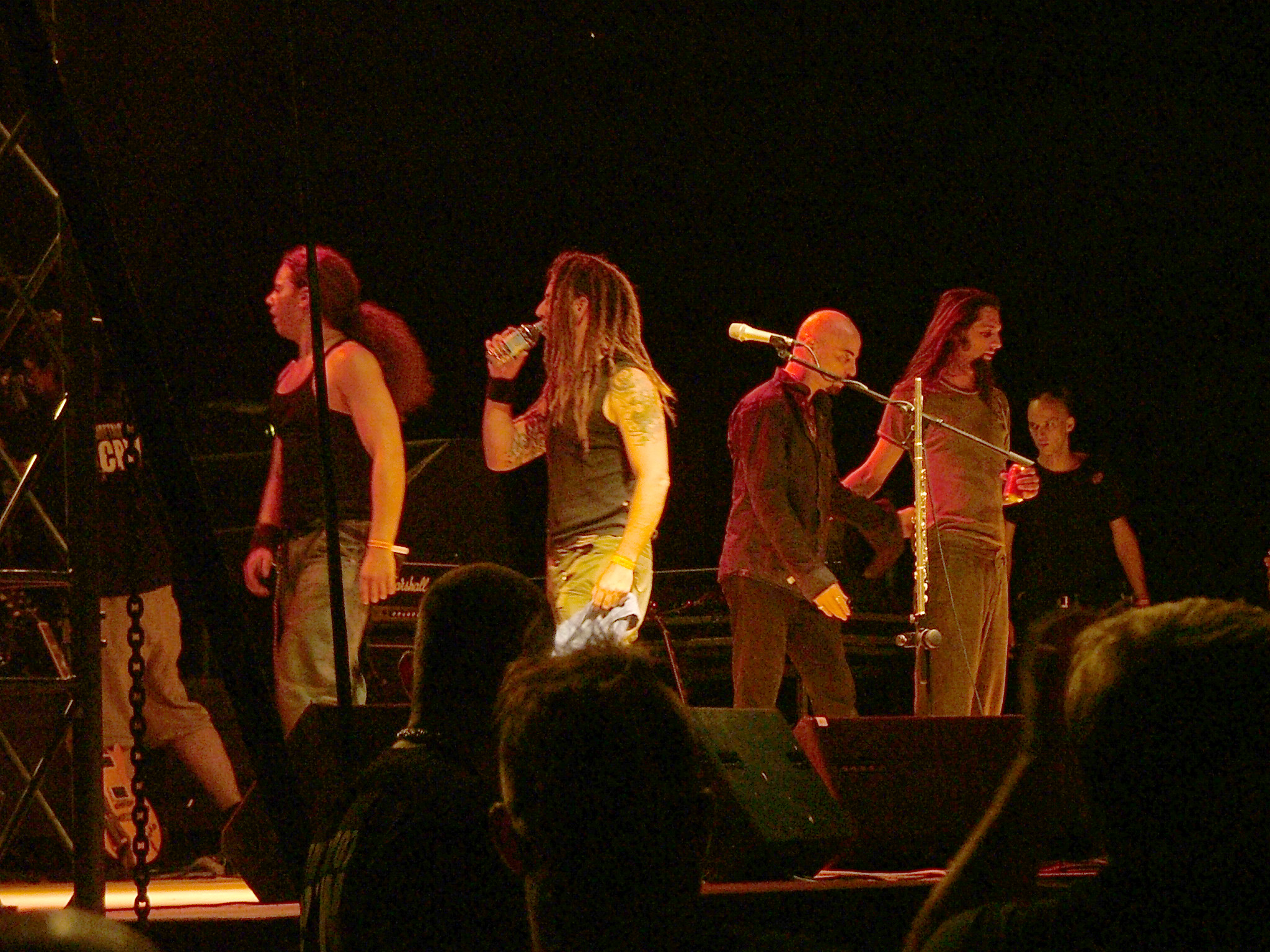
- Deadsoul Tribe at Metalcamp, Slovenia, 2007

Background information
- Origin: Vienna, Austria
- Genres: Progressive metal
- Years active: 2000−2009
- Label: InsideOut Music
- Members: Devon Graves; Adel Moustafa; Roland Ivenz; Roland "Rollz" Kerschbaumer
- Website: deadsoultribe.com

Deadsoul Tribe were an Austrian progressive metal band founded by Devon Graves (known as 'Buddy Lackey') from Psychotic Waltz.

== History ==
Deadsoul Tribe was formed by Devon Graves in 2000. Graves was originally the vocalist for another progressive metal band, Psychotic Waltz, where he was credited as Buddy Lackey, but departed from the group in 1997, claiming that he felt himself to be the band's "weakest link". In Deadsoul Tribe Graves serves as the principal songwriter, lead vocalist and guitarist as well as the producer on all of its releases.

The remainder of the band consisted of Adel Moustafa on drums and Roland Ivenz on bass, with Roland "Rollz" Kerschbaumer, who joined the band in 2002, providing additional guitar work. The band's sound is characterized by heavy usage of tribal rhythms, dark atmospherics and unusual time signatures.

Several Deadsoul Tribe tracks, such as "Black Smoke and Mirrors" on A Murder of Crows and "Toy Rockets" on The January Tree feature Devon Graves on flute, an instrument he picked up largely due to his admiration for Jethro Tull frontman Ian Anderson.

The band's fifth studio album, A Lullaby for the Devil, was released on 11 September 2007.

On 20 November 2009, the band split up.

== Members ==
- Devon Graves − vocals, guitar, keyboards, flute (2000−2009)
- Adel Moustafa − drums (2000−2009)
- Roland Ivenz − bass (2000− 2009)
- Roland "Rollz" Kerschbaumer − rhythm guitar (2002−2009)
- Volker Wiltschko − guitar (2000−2004)

== Discography ==
Studio albums

- Deadsoul Tribe (2002)
- A Murder of Crows (2003)
- The January Tree (2004)
- The Dead Word (2005)
- A Lullaby for the Devil (2007)

== See also ==
Related genres

- Progressive metal
- Progressive rock
- Neo-prog

Related bands

- Psychotic Waltz
