= Stone's Reach =

Studio album by Be'lakor
- Released: 20 June 2009
- Genre: Melodic death metal
- Length: 59:25
- Label: Prime Cuts

Be'lakor chronology
The Frail Tide (2007)	Stone's Reach (2009)	Of Breath and Bone (2012)

Stone's Reach is the second studio album by Australian melodic death metal band, Be'lakor, released in 2009. Stone's Reach won “Best Melodeath/Gothenburg” album in 2009 metalstorm.net awards. The album was remastered and rereleased for vinyl on 19 December 2014 and digitally 22 December 2014. In 2014, Stone's Reach was voted "The Best Melodeath / Gothenburg Metal Album" in the Metalstorm.net ten year anniversary awards.

The album was tracked, edited and mixed at PennyDrop Audio in Cheltenham, Melbourne by Warren Hammond.

== Track listing ==
No.	Title	Length
1.	"Venator"	8:37
2.	"From Scythe to Sceptre"	6:58
3.	"Outlive the Hand"	8:39
4.	"Sun's Delusion"	9:09
5.	"Held in Hollows"	7:23
6.	"Husks"	2:48
7.	"Aspect"	5:51
8.	"Countless Skies"	10:00
Total length:		59:25
