= Parasite Inc. =

German melodic death metal band

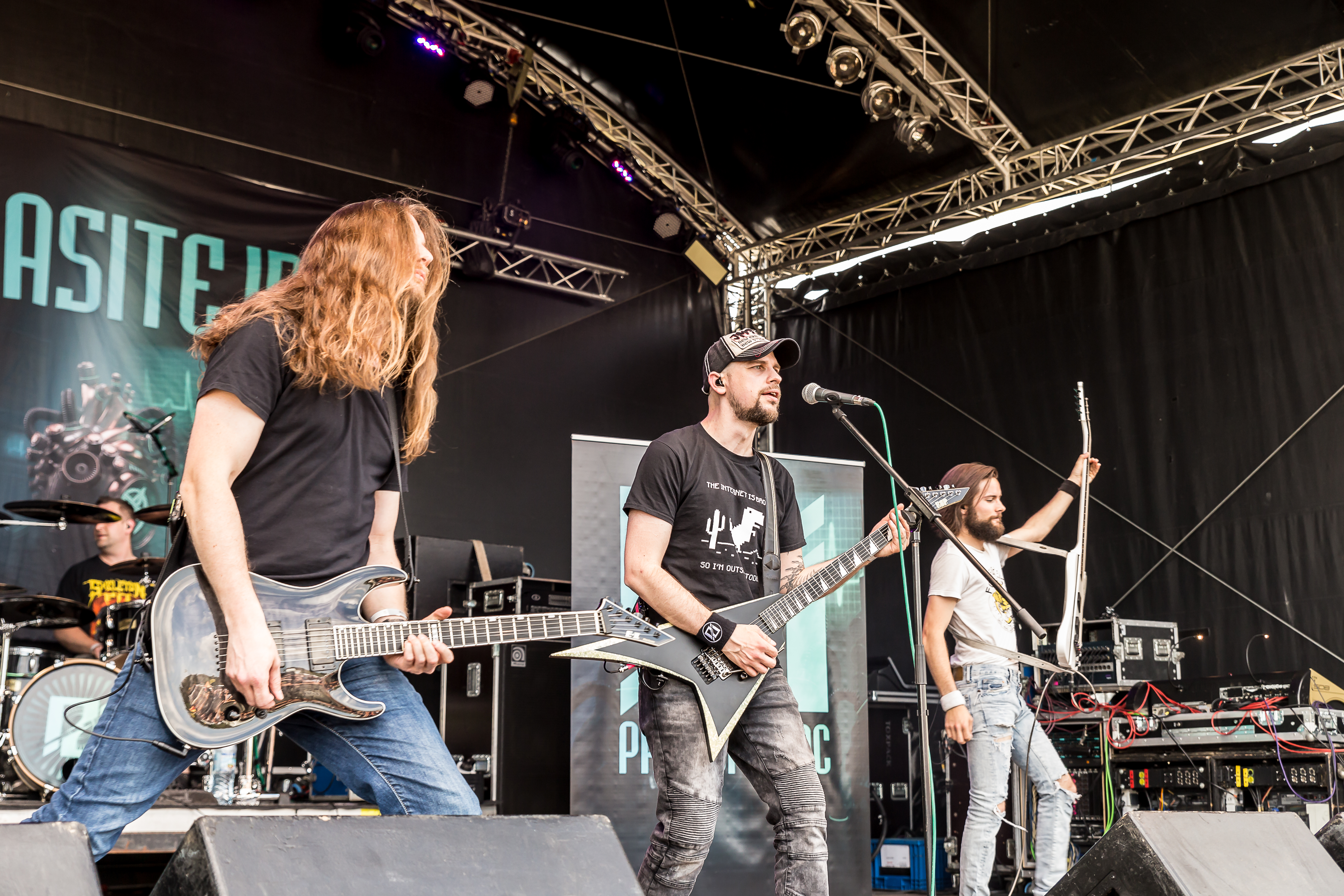
- Parasite Inc. in 2019

Background information
- Origin: Aalen, Germany
- Genres: Melodic death metal
- Years active: 2007–present
- Labels: Reaper Entertainment
- Members: Kai Bigler; Benjamin Stelzer; Dominik Sorg; Lucien Mosesku
- Past members: Patrick Hauf; Benedikt Grubauer; Sebastian Schmid; Kevin Sierra; Stefan Krämer
- Website: parasiteinc.de

Parasite Inc. is a German melodic death metal band from Aalen. Formed in 2007, the band currently consists of Kai Bigler (vocals, guitar), Dominik Sorg (guitar), Lucien Mosesku (bass) and Benjamin Stelzer (drums).

== History ==
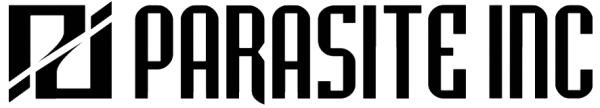
The group's logo

The band formed in 2007 after guitar player Kai Bigler and drummer Benjamin Stelzer decided to start a band. The line-up was completed by Benedikt Grubauer (guitar) and Patrick Hauf (bass). During the first two years the band wrote songs for an album and played several concerts. In early 2010 they released a self-titled demo album, which was recorded in late 2009 in the band's own recording studio. The mixing was done by Hendrik Kröger, while the mastering was done by the band itself. About that time Patrick Hauf left the band and was replaced by Sebastian Schmid. The demo received critical acclaim, high review scores and sold out soon. In the same year Parasite Inc. was chosen out of over 2000 applicants to play at the Summer Breeze Open Air as part of the New Blood Award.

In the following years the band played many more concerts among others with Heaven Shall Burn, Hatesphere, The Sorrow and Hackneyed. In summer 2011 Benedikt Grubauer left the band and was replaced by Kevin Sierra (ex-Hackneyed). In 2012 Parasite Inc. signed a record deal with Good Damn Records (later renamed to Rebel Tune Records). For their first official release Time Tears Down they re-recorded all songs of the demo album alongside 5 new songs. The album was mixed by the band itself and mastered by Jens Bogren (Fascination Street Studios). During the recordings Sebastian Schmid left the band. Stefan Krämer (Skelton Pit, ex-Torment Tool) took his place.

Time Tears Down was released on 2 August 2013 via Good Damn Records. The album received very good reviews and high ratings by leading German metal magazines. It also reached number 26 in the official German rock-metal charts and stayed in the top 30 for several weeks. The music video for the song The Pulse of the Dead was especially successful on YouTube. In 2014 Kevin Sierra left the band and Dominik Sorg became a new full-time member. Following the release of Time Tears Down the band played concerts all over Europe including the Out-and-Loud Festival of 2014 in Germany, the Karmøygeddon Festival in Norway and the Summer Breeze Festival in Germany, both in 2016. In 2018 Parasite Inc. signed to Reaper Entertainment for the release of their sophomore album, Dead and Alive, which was released on 17 August 2018 and hit German charts on #33 one week later. During summer 2019 Stefan Krämer left the band and Lucien Mosesku joined the band as their new bass player. In November 2020 Parasite Inc. released a live album Live at the EMFA recorded at the European Metal Festival Alliance via Reaper Entertainment.

In late 2021 the last few songs for their third record 'Cyan Night Dreams' were written and recorded. The band released three singles ('I Am', 'Cyan Night Dreams', 'Follow The Blind') before the album was released on August 19th 2022. The album hit the German charts on #20, this marks the highest chart entry of Parasite Inc. so far.

== Musical style ==
Parasite Inc.'s musical style is mostly categorised as melodic death metal by the music press and the band itself. It features characteristics of death metal as well as harmonic riffing as found in classical heavy metal and also incorporates electronic and industrial elements. Historically, vocalist Kai Bigler only used screaming and growling in his vocals. However, he has started to introduce clean singing parts into some of the songs on the new album, Cyan Night Dreams.

== Members ==
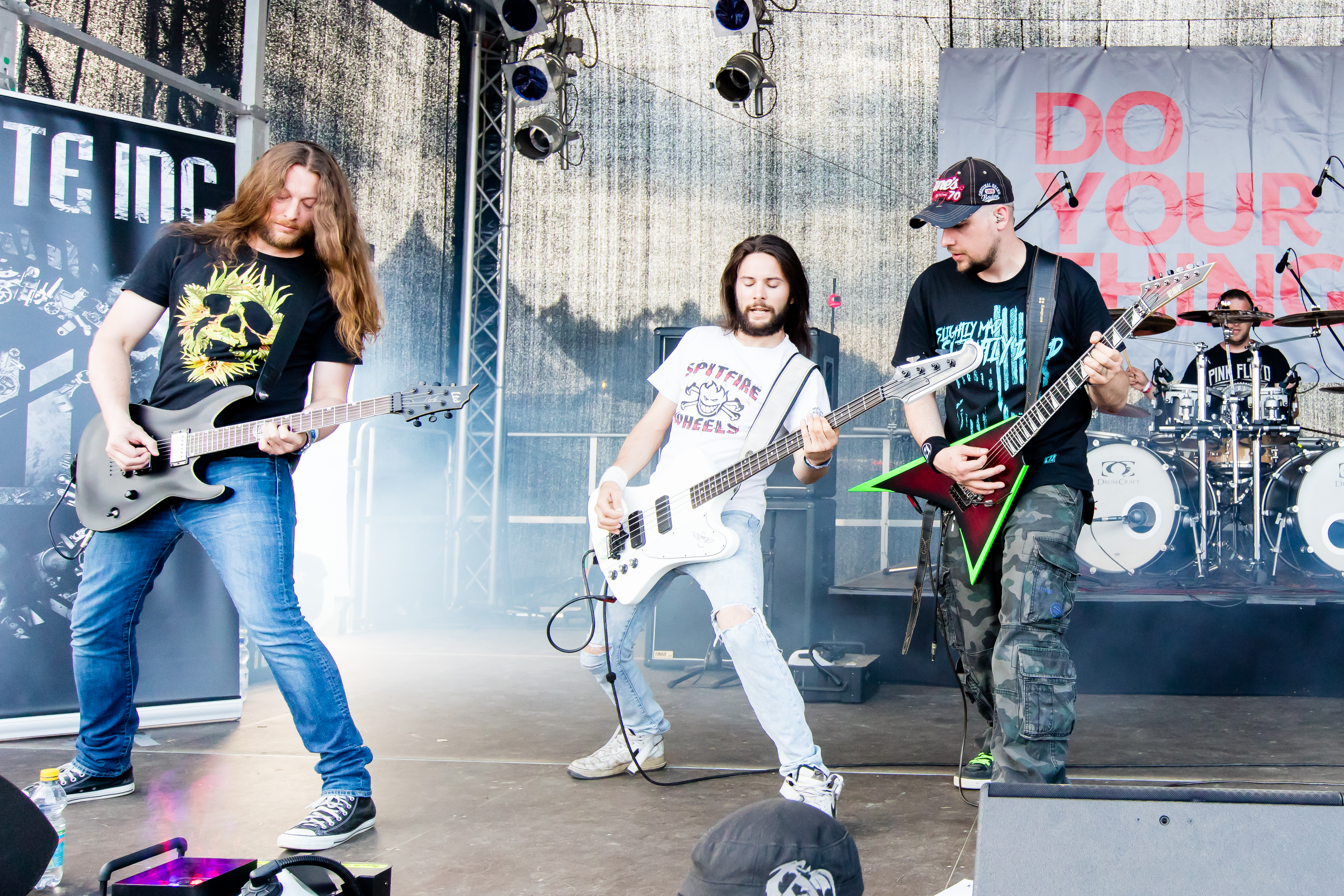
Parasite Inc. performing in 2016

Current members

- Kai Bigler – lead vocals, guitar (2007–present)
- Benjamin Stelzer – drums (2007–present)
- Lucien Mosesku – bass, backing vocals (2019–present)
- Dominik Sorg – guitar (2014–present)

Former members

- Patrick Hauf – bass (2007–2009)
- Benedikt Grubauer – guitar (2007–2011)
- Sebastian Schmid – bass (2009–2013)
- Kevin Sierra – guitar (2011–2014)
- Stefan Krämer – bass (2013–2019)

Timeline

== Discography ==
Studio albums

- August 2013: Time Tears Down (Good Damn Records)
- August 2018: Dead and Alive (Reaper Entertainment)
- August 2022: Cyan Night Dreams (Reaper Entertainment)

Live albums

- 2020: Live at the EMFA 2020 (Reaper Entertainment)

Demo album

- 2010: Parasite Inc. (self-released)

Sampler contributions

- 2010: Local Underground with "Unmeant Outcasts" (via Maniacs Music)
- 2012: Local Underground II with "The Pulse of the Dead" (via Maniacs Music)
