= Vessels (Be'lakor album) =

Studio album by Be'lakor
- Released: 24 June 2016
- Recorded: Legion Studio Productions, Melbourne, 2015
- Genre: Melodic death metal
- Length: 55:05
- Label: Napalm Records
- Producer: Be'lakor, Julian Renzo

Be'lakor chronology
Of Breath and Bone (2012)	Vessels (2016)	Coherence (2021)

Professional ratings
Review scores
Source	Rating
Angry Metal Guy	3.5/5 stars
Metal.de	4.0/5 stars
Metal Blast	5.0/5 stars
Metal Hammer	3.5/5 stars
Sputnikmusic	4.5/5 stars
Heavy Blog Is Heavy	4/5 stars

Vessels is the fourth studio album by Australian melodic death metal band, Be'lakor, released on 24 June 2016. Vessels won “Best Heavy Album” in The Age Music Victoria, an Australian industry-voted music award, awards in 2016.

== Track listing ==
No.	Title	Length
1.	"Luma"	1:59
2.	"An Ember's Arc"	8:28
3.	"Withering Strands"	10:56
4.	"Roots to Sever"	7:05
5.	"Whelm"	7:19
6.	"A Thread Dissolves"	2:58
7.	"Grasping Light"	6:51
8.	"The Smoke of Many Fires"	9:29
Total length:		55:05
