= Gwyllion (band) =

Belgian power metal band

- Origin: Kortrijk, Belgium
- Genres: Symphonic power metal
- Years active: 2003–2009
- Labels: Rubicon, Black Bards, Alive
- Members: Wouter Debonnet; Martijn Debonnet; Steve Deleu; Thomas Halsberghe; Joris Debonnet
- Past members: Annelore Vantomme; Valerie Vanhoutte; Ann Van Rooy

Gwyllion was a symphonic power metal band from Kortrijk, Belgium, that was active from 2003 to 2009. Founded by singer Annelore Vantomme and drummer Wouter Debonnet, the band released two studio albums before it split up.

== History ==
In 2004, they recorded a demo Forever Denying the Never with interim singer Valerie Vanhoutte. Two years later, the band decided to look for a different singer and Annelore Vantomme joined them again; also a second guitarist was taken in. With this line-up they recorded a full-length studio album Awakening the Dream which was published in 2007. It was a self-release in Europe and was published by Rubicon Music in Japan. It received positive reviews by the Mindview magazine and others. The same year, Gwyllion played as opening acts for After Forever, Diablo Swing Orchestra and Haggard.

A second studio album, The Edge of All I Know, was produced in 2008 in Sweden by Jens Bogren who has also worked with acts like Opeth, Pain Of Salvation and Katatonia. In late 2008, the band signed with the German label Black Bards Entertainment to release the album in Europe. In Japan, the album was again released by Rubicon. Shortly before the release in 2009, singer Vantomme had to leave the band for personal reasons and was quickly replaced by Ann van Rooy. The album was lauded by the German music press, e.g. by Metal Hammer and Sonic Seducer. The latter marked a reminiscence of early works by Nightwish or Epica, and praised the aesthetics of the songs.

After the release of The Edge of All I Know in 2009, the band received airplay in Belgium, the Netherlands, Germany and America. Later that year they played at the Celtic Rock Open Air in Germany. In autumn 2009, singer Ann van Rooy and the other band members decided to part ways. Shortly after, it was decided to end the Gwyllion project.

== Members ==
=== Core members ===
- Martijn Debonnet − guitar and vocals (2003-2009)
- Steve Deleu − guitar (2007-2009)
- Thomas Halsberghe − bass guitar (2003-2009)
- Joris Debonnet − keyboards and vocals (2003-2009)
- Wouter Debonnet − drums (2003-2009)

=== Former members ===
- Annelore Vantomme − vocals (2003, 2007-2009)
- Valerie Vanhoutte − vocals (2004-2006)
- Ann Van Rooy − vocals (2009)

Timeline

== Discography ==
- Forever Denying The Never (demo, 2004).
- Awakening the Dream (self-release, 2007)
- The Edge of All I Know (Black Bards Entertainment, Alive, 2009)
