= The Dead Word =

Studio album by Deadsoul Tribe
- Released: 11 November 2005
- Genre: Progressive metal
- Length: 46:57
- Label: InsideOut Music

Deadsoul Tribe chronology
The January Tree (2004)	The Dead Word (2005)	A Lullaby for the Devil (2007)

The Dead Word is the fourth full-length studio album by the progressive metal band Deadsoul Tribe, released on 11 November 2005 by InsideOut Music.

== Track listing ==
1. "Prelude: Time and Pressure" − 1:40
2. "A Flight on an Angels Wing" − 4:31
3. "To My Beloved…" − 5:56
4. "Don't You Ever Hurt?" − 4:56
5. "Some Sane Advice" − 3:57
6. "Let the Hammer Fall" − 4:03
7. "Waiting in Line" − 6:34
8. "Someday" − 1:34
9. "My Dying Wish" − 4:01
10. "A Fistful of Bended Nails" − 5:25
11. "The Long Ride Home" − 4:20

== Credits ==
- Devon Graves − lead vocals, guitar, flute
- Roland Ivenz − bass
- Adel Moustafa − drums
- Roland Kerschbaumer − guitar
