= The Frail Tide =

Studio album by Be'lakor
- Released: 21 April 2007
- Genre: Melodic death metal
- Length: 42:50
- Label: Self-released

Be'lakor chronology
The Frail Tide (2007)	Stone's Reach (2009)

The Frail Tide is the first studio album by Australian melodic death metal band, Be'lakor, released on 21 April 2007.

== Track listing ==
No.	Title	Length
1.	"Neither Shape Nor Shadow"	7:41
2.	"The Desolation of Ares"	8:08
3.	"Tre'aste"	5:41
4.	"A Natural Apostasy"	6:38
5.	"Paths"	6:03
6.	"Sanguinary"	8:40
Total length:		42:50
