= Dismantling Devotion =

Studio album by Daylight Dies
- Released: March 7, 2006
- Genre: Melodic death metal Doom metal
- Label: Candlelight Records
- Producer: Jens Bogren, Egan O'Rourke

Daylight Dies chronology
Live at the Contamination Festival (2005)	Dismantling Devotion (2006)	Lost to the Living (2008)

Professional ratings
Review scores
Source	Rating
Allmusic	link
Kerrang	link
Metal Hammer	link
Revolver	link
Terrorizer	link

Dismantling Devotion is the second full-length album by Daylight Dies released by Candlelight Records in 2006.

== Track listing ==
No.	Title	Length
1.	"A Life Less Lived"	8:23
2.	"Dead Air"	5:23
3.	"A Dream Resigned"	7:28
4.	"All We Had"	6:55
5.	"Solitary Refinement"	5:23
6.	"Strive to See"	6:39
7.	"Lies that Bind"	5:53
8.	"Dismantling Devotion"	6:59
Total length:		53:03

== Credits ==
- Nathan Ellis – harsh vocals
- Barre Gambling – guitars
- Charley Shackelford – guitars
- Egan O'Rourke – bass, clean vocals
- Jesse Haff – drums

=== Session musicians ===
- Matthew Golombisky – contrabass
