= Deadly Decadence =

EP by Triosphere
- Released: 2005
- Recorded: Studio Godt Selskap, Trondheim
- Genre: Heavy metal, power metal, progressive metal
- Length: 14:28
- Producer: Rune Stavnesli

Triosphere chronology
Deadly Decadence (2005)	Onwards (2006)

Deadly Decadence is an EP and the debut recording by the Norwegian heavy metal band Triosphere.

It was released in 2005 one year after the band's creation, and was followed up by their first full-length album, Onwards (which also includes tracks 2 and 3) a year later.

== Track listing ==
All music by Marius Silver Bergesen, all lyrics by Ida Haukland.

No.	Title	Length
1.	"The Holy Trinity of Decadence"	4:50
2.	"The Silver Lining"	4:28
3.	"Sunriser"	4:53

== Personnel ==
Triosphere

- Ida Haukland - lead vocals, bass
- Marius Silver Bergesen - lead and rhythm guitars
- Ørjan Aare Jørgensen - drums

Production

- Rune Stavnesli - producing
