= Coherence (Be'lakor album) =

Studio album by Be'lakor
- Released: 29 October 2021
- Studio: Pony Music, Melbourne
- Genre: Melodic death metal
- Length: 60:03
- Label: Napalm Records
- Producer: Be'lakor; Troy McCosker

Be'lakor chronology
Vessels (2016)	Coherence (2021)

Singles from Coherence
- 1. "Hidden Window" Released: 2021; 2. "Foothold" Released: 2021; 3. "Valence" Released: 2021

Coherence is the fifth studio album by the Australian melodic death metal band Be'lakor. It was released by the music label Napalm Records on 29 October 2021.

== Background ==
Coherence is the first new full length album released by the band since 2016. The album was mixed by Jens Bogren (Opeth, Katatonia, Leprous, At the Gates). Three music videos were released for the album. The videos for "Hidden Window" and "Foothold" are lyric videos, while the video for "Valence" is a typical music video.

Keyboardist Steve Merry stated in regards to the album "Coherence has two of our longest ever songs; it has some really substantial instrumental tracks; it’s heavy and progressive in places, but still full of the melody that drives our work. The album’s lyrics also explore quite different ideas to those of our earlier albums."

== Reception ==
Professional ratings
Review scores
Source	Rating
Metal Injection	9/10
Sonic Perspectives	8.9/10
Sputnikmusic	4.2/5
Distorted Sound	9/10

The album was well received by both fans and critics. Metal Injection noted that "their progressive-inflected brand of melodic death metal is rocking enough to satisfy people who crave a true death metal experience, yet dynamic enough to please those who don't feel like listening to an hour of blast beats... Coherence is an outstanding melodic death metal album and is highly recommended to metal fans of all persuasions." This is the kind of album that proclaims its prowess right away, but has enough staying power to keep even the most devoted listeners occupied for the rest of 2021, if not well into the next year, thanks to its highly involved and complicated nature. Be'lakor's songwriting abilities are unrivaled in the genre, as they push and pull dynamics and atmosphere like no one else in the melodic death metal genre. The sheer wealth of sensations evoked by this record is a treat to behold, yet it is done so without vanity or self-indulgence.

The album was nominated 'Global Metal Release Of The Year' at the 2021 Global Metal Apocalypse awards, it finished 4th.

== Track listing ==
Coherence track listing
No.	Title	Length
1.	"Locus"	10:49
2.	"The Dispersion"	1:53
3.	"Foothold"	7:19
4.	"Valence"	9:10
5.	"Sweep of Days"	5:17
6.	"Hidden Window"	8:24
7.	"Indelible"	4:59
8.	"Much More Was Lost"	12:11

== Personnel ==
Be'Lakor

- George Kosmas – guitar, vocals
- Shaun Sykes – guitar
- John Richardson – bass
- Elliott Sansom – drums
- Steven Merry - Keyboard

Production

- Troy McCosker – producer
- Jens Bogren - mixing
- Tony Lindgren - mastering

== Charts ==
Chart performance for Coherence
Chart (2021)	Peak position
German Albums (Offizielle Top 100)	51
Swiss Albums (Schweizer Hitparade)	75
US Top Album Sales (Billboard)	94
