= Be'lakor =

Australian melodic death metal band

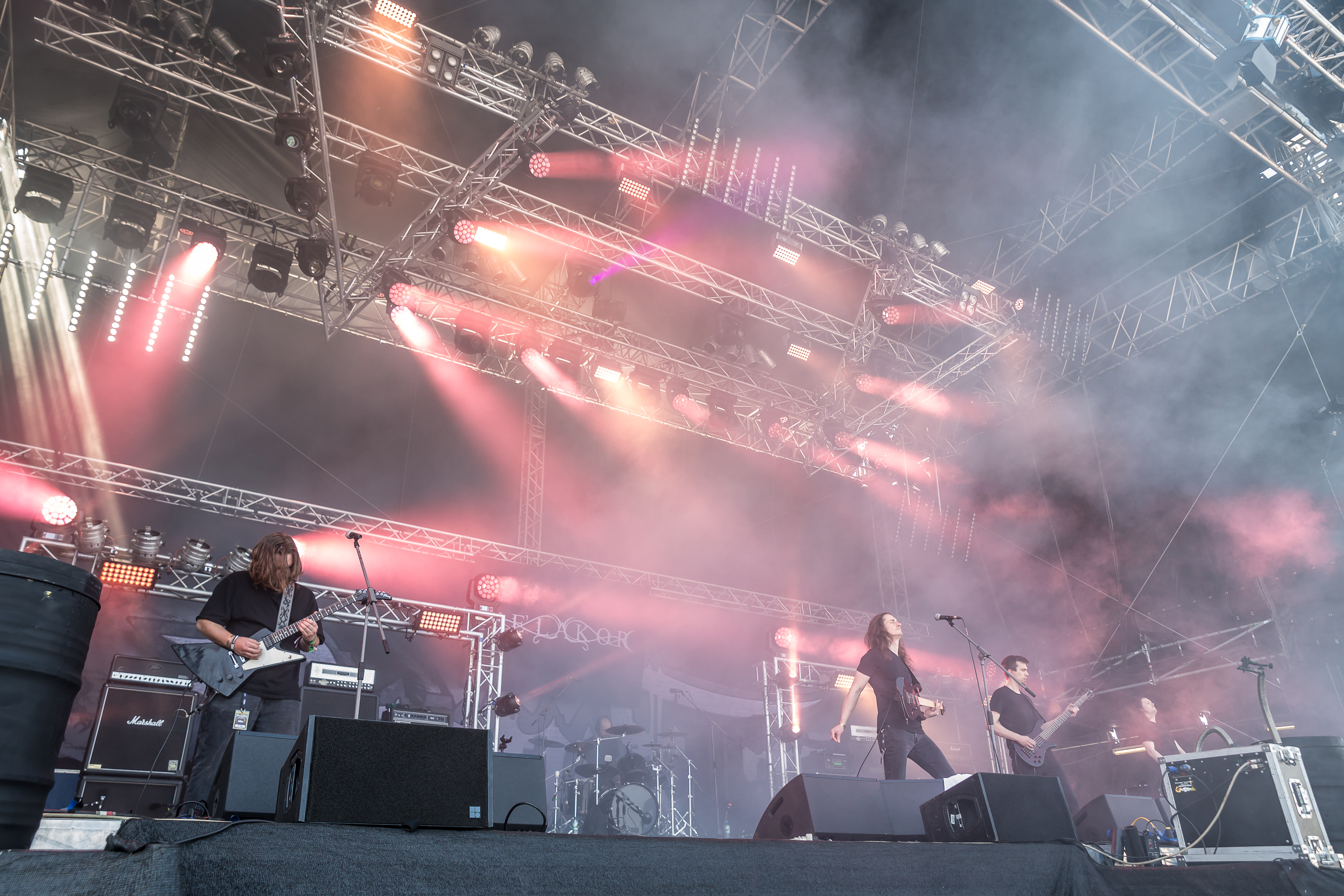
- Be’Lakor live in 2023

Background information
- Origin: Melbourne, Victoria, Australia
- Genres: Melodic death metal
- Years active: 2004–present
- Labels: Kolony, Prime Cuts, Descent, Napalm
- Members: George Kosmas; Shaun Sykes; Steven Merry; John Richardson; Elliott Sansom
- Past members: Jimmy Vanden Broeck
- Website: belakorband.com

Be'lakor is an Australian melodic death metal band from Melbourne, Victoria.

== History ==
Be'lakor formed in 2004. In 2007, the band self-released their debut album, The Frail Tide, which received generally positive reviews. In 2008, Be'lakor signed with Descent Productions, and re-released The Frail Tide in digipack form. In 2009, Be'lakor embarked on a national tour, and signed with Prime Cuts Music. Their second album, Stone's Reach, was released on 20 June 2009 and received much praise by reviewers. In November 2009, Be'lakor signed with Kolony Records.

In March 2010, Be'lakor's album Stone's Reach took first place in Metal Storm's "Best Melodeath/Gothenburg Metal Album" for 2009. Be'lakor also supported Turisas on their national tour of Australia in May. They were the opening act for Alestorm in Melbourne for their "PLUNDER DOWNUNDER” tour in June 2010. The band also performed at the Summer Breeze Open Air Festival in Germany in August 2010.

Be'lakor released their third album Of Breath and Bone in June 2012. They began touring Europe, playing Brutal Assault in the Czech Republic. They also performed at the Summer Breeze Open Air Festival in Germany during August 2012. They supported Apocalyptica in Melbourne during their 2012 Australia tour in September, and At the Gates in Melbourne during their tour in November. On 24 June 2016, Be'lakor released Vessels, the band's fourth album. Coherence followed five years later, on 29 October 2021. In March 2025, the band announced their first ever North American tour, covering cities in United States and Canada.

== Band members ==
Current

- George Kosmas – vocals, guitars (2004–present)
- Shaun Sykes – guitars (2004–present)
- John Richardson – bass (2004–present)
- Steven Merry – keyboards, piano (2004–present)
- Elliott Sansom – drums (2015–present)

Former

- Jimmy Vanden Broeck – drums (2004–2015)

Touring

- Matt Dodds – guitars (2015)

== Discography ==
- The Frail Tide (2007)
- Stone's Reach (2009)
- Of Breath and Bone (2012)
- Vessels (2016)
- Coherence (2021)

== Awards and nominations ==
=== Music Victoria Awards ===
The Music Victoria Awards are an annual awards night celebrating Victorian music. They commenced in 2006.

Year	Nominee / work	Award	Result	Ref.
Music Victoria Awards of 2016	Vessels	Best Heavy Album	Won	
