= Triosphere =

Norwegian heavy metal band

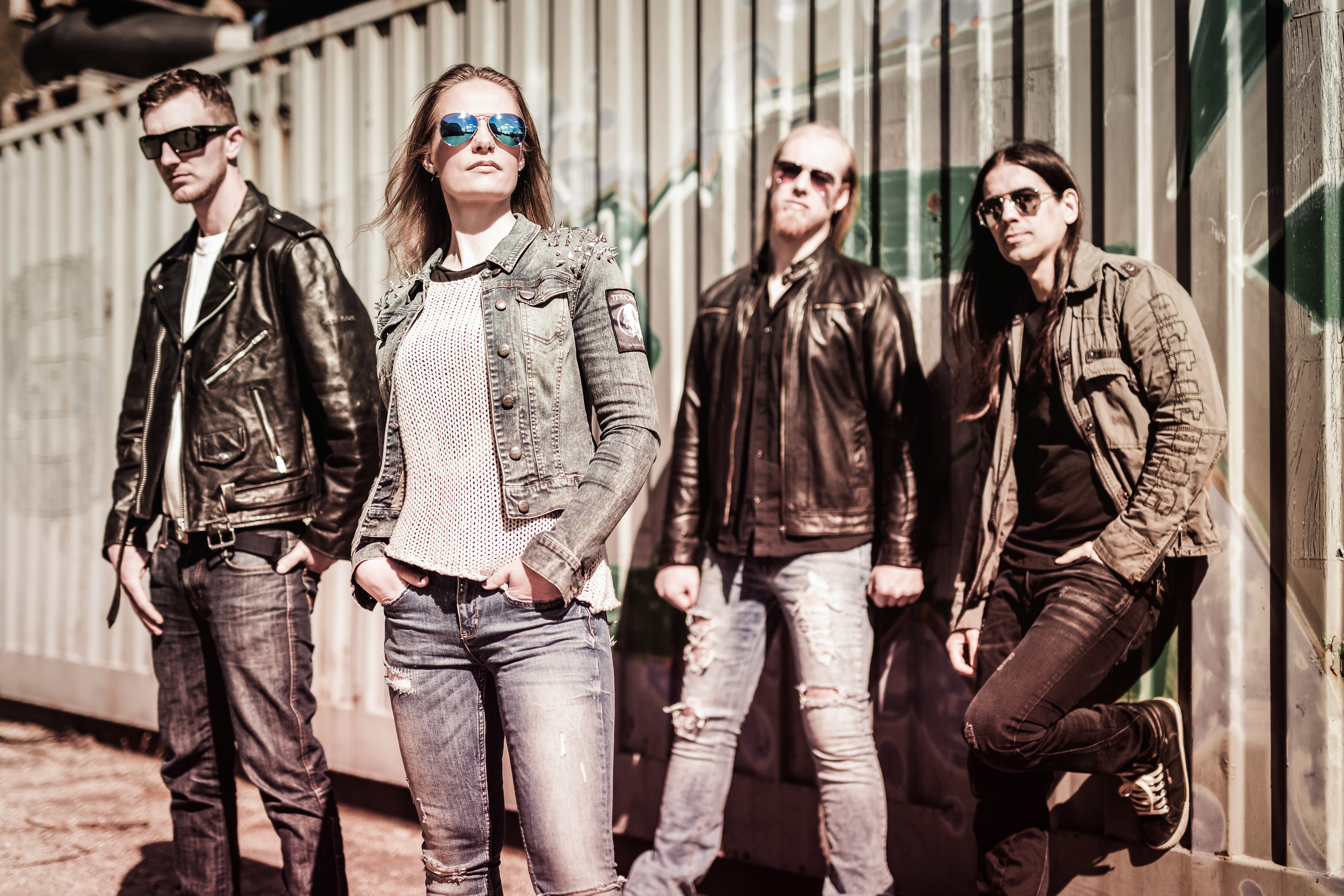
- Triosphere in 2016. From left to right: Tårneby, Haukland, Byberg, and Bergesen.

Background information
- Origin: Norway
- Genres: Heavy metal, power metal, progressive metal
- Years active: 2004 – present
- Labels: AFM Records, Face Front, Plastic Head Distribution, Spiritual Beast
- Members: Ida Haukland; Marius "Silver" Bergesen; Tor Ole Byberg; Kenneth Tårneby
- Past members: Ørjan Aare Jørgensen
- Website: http://www.thetriosphere.com/

Triosphere is a Norwegian heavy metal band from Trondheim, created in 2004 by singer and bassist Ida Haukland, and guitarist Marius Silver Bergesen. They are defined by their heavy metal sound emphasising their power metal-like melodies and choruses, while also featuring progressive elements. Bergesen is the composer of all instrumental parts, with Haukland acting as lyricist, and composer of the vocal parts.

The band was originally formed as a trio consisting of Haukland, Silver, and drummer Ørjan Aare Jørgensen, who released their first EP Deadly Decadence in 2005. After recording their first album Onwards released in 2006, they expanded into a quartet with the addition of second guitarist Tor Ole Byberg and toured with various bands including W.A.S.P., Kamelot, Arch Enemy, and Sonata Arctica. Meanwhile, they released the albums The Road Less Travelled in 2010 and The Heart of the Matter in 2014, both to critical acclaim. Jørgensen left the band in March 2014 after recording his parts for The Heart of the Matter, and was replaced by Kenneth Tårneby in November.

== History ==
Triosphere formed in 2004, and released their first EP, Deadly Decadence, in 2005. 2006 saw the Norwegian release of their debut album Onwards, which was subsequently released in Asia, the United States and the rest of Europe, and received positive reviews from critics. Created as a trio, the band's line-up expanded in 2006 to incorporate second guitarist Byberg, previously only recognized as a live member.

In 2006 and 2007, Triosphere did two Norwegian tours with W.A.S.P., as well as three European tours from 2007 to 2009 alongside several artists including W.A.S.P., Kotipelto, Chris Caffery, Kamelot, Jørn Lande, Arch Enemy, and Destruction. In August 2009, the band received the award for Metal album of the Year from the "Just Plain Folks Music Organization", the world's largest independent music organization, in competition with more than 40,000 artists in all genres around the world.

Their second album, The Road Less Travelled was picked up by AFM Records and released on May 28, 2010. The album is for the first time produced by Bergesen (also co-producer of the previous album) but also by Haukland. It received very favourable reviews from critics, and was later featured in several "Best Albums of the Year" lists from heavy metal-focused websites.

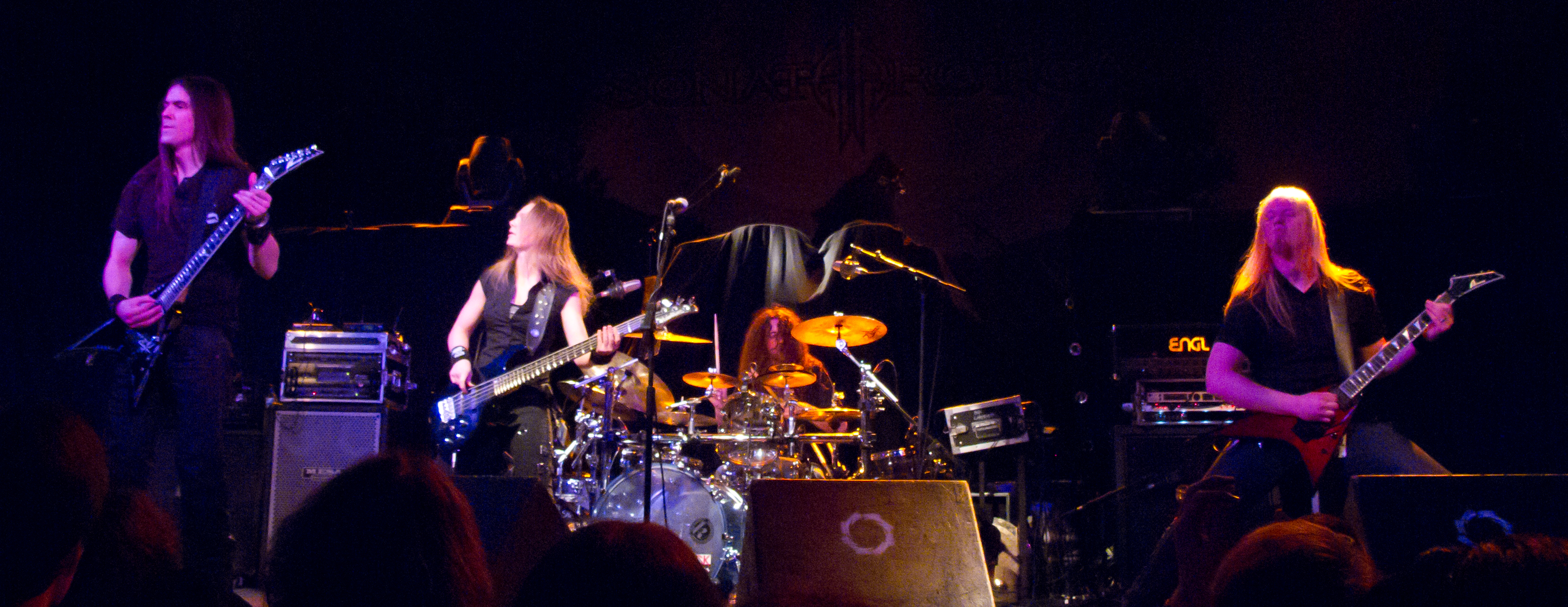
Triosphere performing in 2011. Left to right: Silver, Haukland, Jørgensen, and Byberg.

Triosphere joined first Sonata Arctica on their Days of Grays tour, and then shortly after Crimson Glory for a new European tour following the release.

On 2012 Triosphere toured again, this time supporting Kamelot. On November 1, 2013, Triosphere announced that Ørjan Aare Jørgensen had decided to leave the band. He continued to act as drummer until a replacement was found, and departed after a last concert on March 7, 2014, having already recorded his parts for the upcoming album.

On November 7, 2014, the band released their third album The Heart of the Matter. A teaser sample was published on their YouTube channel on September 23. A few days before the release, they announced that Kenneth Tårneby, who had been performing with them since March 2014, was now their full-time drummer. The Heart of the Matter received rave reviews from critics.

On July 12, 2016, the band announced that they had begun writing their fourth album. Although most of 2017 was focused to working on their next album, they also performed another tour with Sonata Arctica from February to March 2017. On September 8, 2018, they made their live American debut, playing at ProgPower USA 2018 at the Center Stage in Atlanta.

== Discography ==
=== Albums ===
- Onwards (2006)
- The Road Less Travelled (2010)
- The Heart of the Matter (2014)
- Oceans Above, Stars Below (2026)

=== Demo ===
- Deadly Decadence (2005)

=== Singles ===
- "Trinity"
- "Human Condition"

=== Music videos ===
- "Trinity"
- "Onwards Part 2"
- "Marionette"

== Members ==
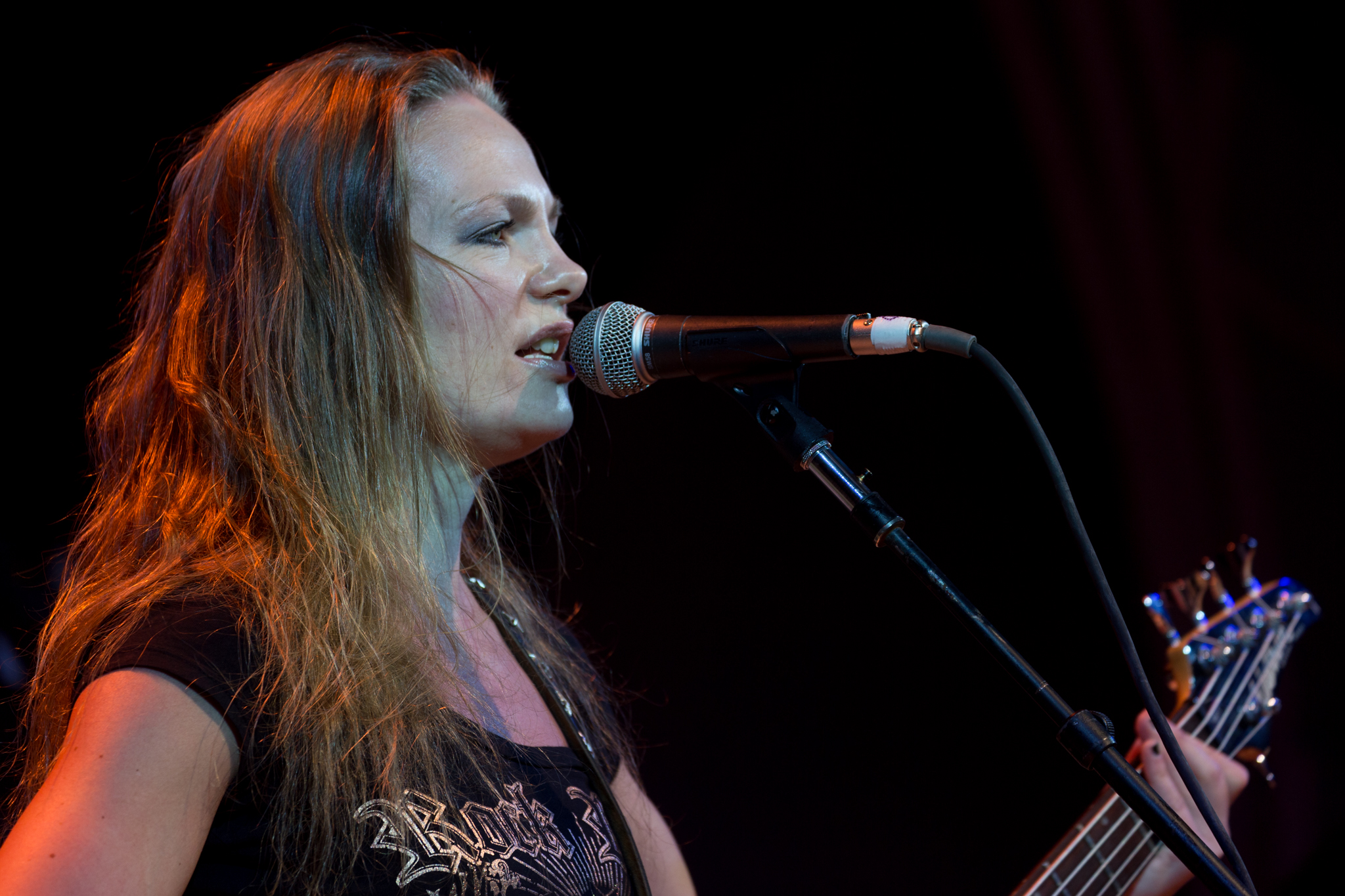
Ida Haukland performing with Triosphere in 2015 at 70000 Tons of Metal.

Current members

- Ida Haukland - lead vocals, bass (2004–present)
- Marius Silver Bergesen - lead and rhythm guitar, live backing vocals (2004–present)
- Tor Ole Byberg - rhythm guitar, live backing vocals (2006–present)
- Kenneth Tårneby - drums (2014–present)

Session members

- Espen Godø - studio keyboards and Mellotron (2006–present)

Former members

- Ørjan Aare Jørgensen - drums (2004–2014)

Former session members

- Anders Vinje - live drums (2011)
- Vidar Lehmann - live drums (2012)
