= Creation's Tears =

Irish heavy metal/gothic metal band

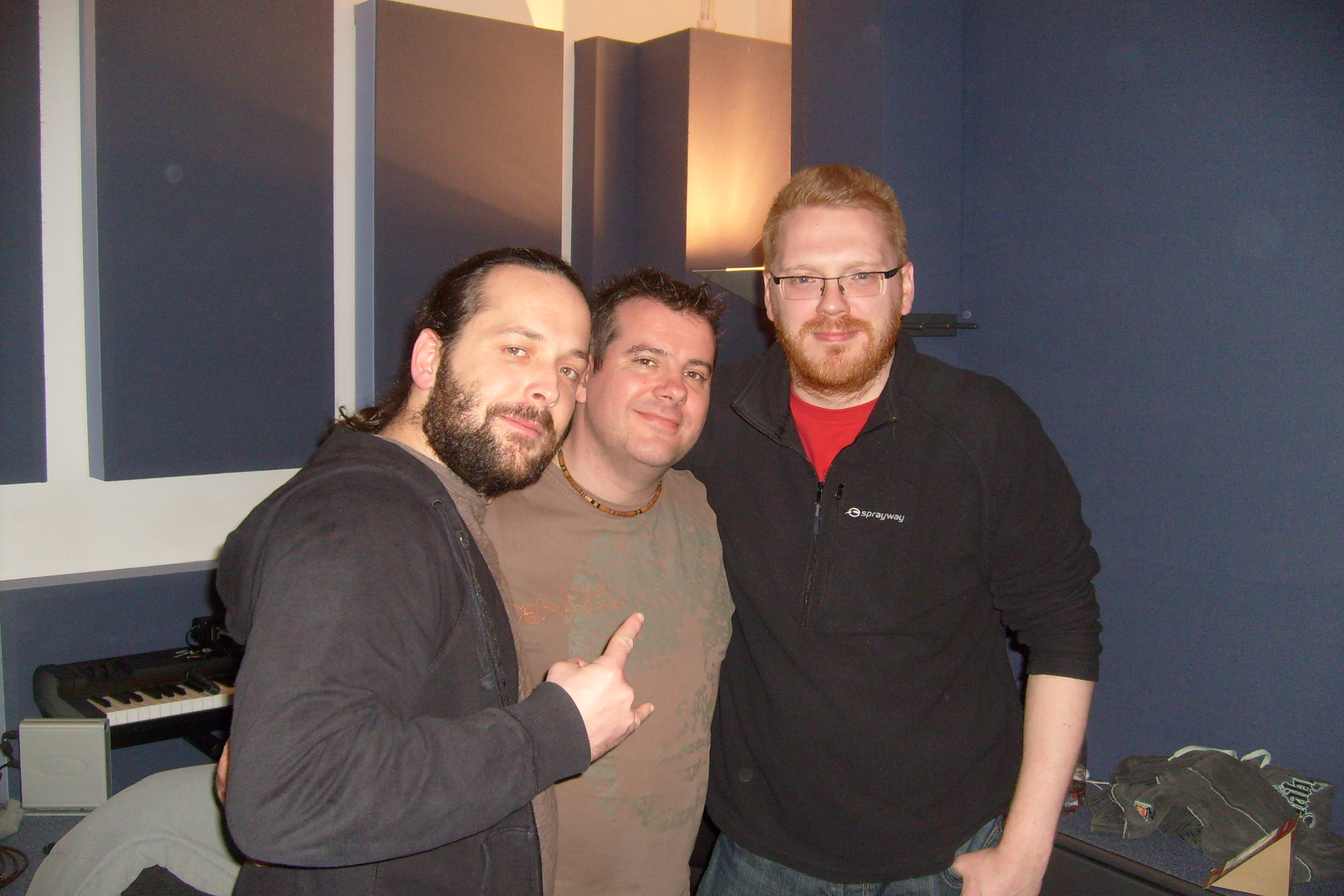
- From left to right: Brian Eddie Reynolds, Lee Morris, Ian Coulter during recording sessions for Methods To End It All in 2010

Background information
- Origin: Ballymena, Northern Ireland & England, United Kingdom
- Genres: Gothic metal, heavy metal, doom metal, alternative rock, hard rock
- Years active: 2002–2005 and 2009–2011
- Members: Brian Eddie Reynolds; Lee Morris (session); Sarah Jezebel Deva (session)
- Website: www.CreationsTears.com

Creation's Tears are an Irish heavy metal/gothic metal band based in Northern Ireland, with some members based in England.

The band's personnel includes former members of established heavy metal acts; Lee Morris ex Paradise Lost and guest female vocalist Sarah Jezebel Deva ex Cradle of Filth. Creation's Tears frontman Brian Eddie Reynolds was one of the earlier pioneers of the death metal scene in Northern Ireland fronting the band Apathy whose "Lack of Emotion" EP featured in Downtown Radio presenter Johnny Hero's NI Chart during the early 1990s in Sunday Life (the biggest-selling Northern Ireland-only Sunday newspaper).

== Genre ==
There is much debate as to the genre of the band. British author, radio DJ and journalist Malcolm Dome has classified the band as "Brit Goth", akin to a fusion of Lacuna Coil and Anathema. Various music publications have also slotted the band into the gothic metal genre. Germany's Legacy Magazine hears elements of thrash metal in the mix. Other publications allude to doom metal influences like My Dying Bride, Opeth, Katatonia and Paradise Lost, while Blistering.com heralds it as being "accessibly morose". The UK's Terrorizer magazine surmises in their Goth Metal supplement, Dominion Mag, that Methods To End It All is "dark rock 'n' roll" and long-standing Kerrang! scribe Steve Beebee hails it as "Dark Metal." The recurring theme is that Creation's Tears are "versatile", "melodic" and "metal." Band frontman Reynolds has been documented in rock music press as saying that Methods To End It All is definitely not a gothic album.

== Biography ==
=== Formation and early career (2002–2005) ===
Creation's Tears initially formed in the middle of 2002 in Ballymena, Northern Ireland by Reynolds who quickly recruited former Apathy member Ian Coulter to fill the role of bassist. The name Creation's Tears was the title of an Apathy song from their 1995 album entitled Inertia. Joe Gillespie guitars and Jonny Crozet drums completed the first Creation's Tears line-up. The band played their first live gig in Belfast on the same bill as Vader, Krisiun, Decapitated and Prejudice. The initial Creation's Tears line-up continued to play only a mere handful of gigs thereafter and failed to produce any recorded material at that time. Owing to the relocation of two band members, the band went on hiatus in 2004/2005 until 2009.

=== Reformation (2009–present) ===
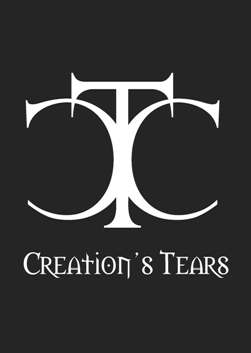
Creation's Tears logo

==== Methods To End It All era ====
In early 2009, Creation's Tears frontman, Reynolds began to pen new material for what would become the Methods To End It All album.

In late 2009, around a dozen songs had been completed by Reynolds but the more pressing issue of finding a suitable drummer within Northern Ireland's small local heavy metal music fraternity was persisting.

Having been a fan of the Paradise Lost album Draconian Times, Reynolds decided that the former Paradise Lost drummer Morris who first played with Paradise Lost on Draconian Times would be the obvious choice. Methods To End It All would be the first heavy metal music album to feature Morris since his departure from Paradise Lost in 2004.

In a completely unexpected twist and just days before recording commenced, bassist Coulter announced he would be leaving Creation's Tears to concentrate on his new marriage. Coulter did however play bass on the band's Methods To End It All album.

Reynolds played all guitar parts (lead, rhythm and acoustic) on the Methods To End It All album.

Recording sessions for Methods To End It All commenced in January 2010. Creation's Tears employed three producers for different attributes of the recording. Ex Kill II This member Mark Mynett recorded the drums with Lee Morris in Huddersfield, England. Producers Jens Bogren (Opeth, Katatonia, Soilwork, Amon Amarth) and David Castillo (Inme, Eluveitie, Katatonia) recorded all guitars at the acclaimed Fascination Street Studio in Örebro, Sweden with vocals and bass recorded at Ghost Ward Studios Stockholm, Sweden where Katatonia recorded Night Is the New Day.

Sarah Jezabel Deva, ex Cradle Of Filth, made a guest appearance on Methods To End It All track Creation's Tears. A different version of the same track (written by Reynolds) appeared on Apathy's Inertia album (1995) but featured Laura Reynolds in the female vocal role. The original version of the song had only one verse (as opposed to two as on Methods To End It All) and also featured a long instrumental outro.

The debut Creation's Tears album Methods To End It All had initially been touted for a Spring 2010 release but following the band's vocalist, Reynolds contracting serious food poisoning during the recording sessions in Stockholm, the release was subsequently postponed. Reynolds would finish a small vocal section at his home studio in Ballymena.

The band chronicled the recording process with a series of DIY "Making of" videos on their YouTube channel. Methods To End It All was eventually released on 4 October 2010 via Cure For Poison Records and distributed through Code 7 / Plastic Head distribution in UK & the Republic of Ireland.

Creation's Tears has been on hold since 2011 as Reynolds suffered a Brainstem Stroke which caused Stroke-Induced Epilepsy and permanent damage to his central nervous system. In February 2017, drummer Lee Morris joined the band Magnum

== Members ==
=== Current members ===
- Brian Eddie Reynolds - vocals, guitars
- Lee Morris - drums (session)
- Ian Coulter - bass (session)

=== Methods To End It All ===
- Brian Eddie Reynolds - vocals, guitars
- Ian Coulter - bass
- Lee Morris - drums (Methods To End It All album)
- Sarah Jezebel Deva - guest vocals (track: "Creation's Tears")

=== Former members ===
- Joe Gillespie - Guitars (2002–2005)
- Jonny Crozet - Drums (2002–2004)
- Ian Coulter - Bass (2002–2005, 2009–2010)
- Conor Mullan - Live Drums (2011)
- Steve Emerson - Live Guitars (2011)

== Discography ==
=== Studio albums ===
- Methods to End It All (2010)
