= A Murder of Crows (album) =

Studio album by Deadsoul Tribe
- Released: 28 July 2003
- Genre: Progressive metal
- Length: 61:13
- Label: Inside Out Music

Deadsoul Tribe chronology
Deadsoul Tribe (2002)	A Murder of Crows (2003)	The January Tree (2004)

Professional ratings
Review scores
Source	Rating
Allmusic	2.5/5 stars

A Murder of Crows is the second full-length studio album by the progressive metal band Deadsoul Tribe, released on 28 July 2003 by InsideOut Music. This time the entire band has come to play for the album with the addition of Roland Kerschbaumer for rhythm guitar and replaced Volker Wilschko to guitar. The song, "Time" is the bonus track for the limited edition which comes in a slipcase.

== Track listing ==
1. "Feed (Part 1 – Stone by Stone)" − 5:04
2. "Feed (Part 2 – The Awakening)" − 2:53
3. "The Messenger" − 5:15
4. "In a Garden Made of Stones" − 6:26
5. "Some Things You Can't Return" − 5:20
6. "Angels in Vertigo" − 4:38
7. "Regret" − 4:36
8. "Crows on the Wire" − 6:48
9. "I'm Not Waving" − 5:34
10. "Flies" − 5:12
11. "Black Smoke and Mirrors" − 4:58
12. "Time" (Bonus Track) − 4:28

== Credits ==
- Devon Graves − guitar, lead vocals, bass, flute, keyboard
- Roland Ivenz − bass
- Adel Moustafa − drums
- Roland Kerschbaumer − rhythm guitar
- lorenna faucher − guitar
