= Of Breath and Bone =

Studio album by Be'lakor
- Released: 1 June 2012
- Recorded: Pennydrop Audio, Melbourne, December 2011 – February 2012
- Genre: Melodic death metal
- Length: 56:18
- Label: Kolony Records
- Producer: Be'lakor

Be'lakor chronology
Stone's Reach (2009)	Of Breath and Bone (2012)	Vessels (2016)

Professional ratings
Review scores
Source	Rating
About.com	4/5 stars
Angry Metal Guy	4.5/5 stars
Metal Hammer	6/7 stars
Metal Storm	4/5 stars
Sputnik Music	3.5/5 stars

Of Breath and Bone is the third studio album by Australian melodic death metal band, Be'lakor. It was released on 1 June 2012. In the 2012 metalstorm.net awards, Of Breath and Bone won “Best Melodeth/Extreme Power/Gothenburg” album.

== Track listing ==
No.	Title	Length
1.	"Abeyance"	8:04
2.	"Remnants"	6:14
3.	"Fraught"	6:46
4.	"Absit Omen"	6:06
5.	"To Stir the Sea"	1:29
6.	"In Parting"	9:21
7.	"The Dream and the Waking"	9:17
8.	"By Moon and Star"	8:58
Total length:		56:18

== Cover art ==
The cover art is a copy of Gabriel Ferrier's Chaperon Rouge painting.
