= Daylight Dies =

American melodic death-doom band

- Daylight Dies, 2008

Background information
- Origin: Asheville, North Carolina, United States
- Genres: Death-doom, melodic death metal
- Years active: 1996–2026
- Labels: Candlelight, Relapse, Tribunal
- Members: Nathan Ellis; Barre Gambling; Charley Shackelford; Egan O'Rourke; Jesse Haff
- Past members: Guthrie Iddings; Matthew Golombisky
- Website: www.daylightdies.com

Daylight Dies was an American melodic death-doom band from North Carolina, United States.

== History ==
Barre Gambling and Jesse Haff formed Daylight Dies in 1996. In 1999, the two recorded the band's first demo, The Long Forgotten Demo. In 2000, singer Guthrie Iddings joined the band and the trio recorded the band's second demo, Idle, released through Tribunal Records. In 2001, bassist Egan O'Rourke joined and the band recorded a two-song demo meant for record labels only. In late 2001, they signed with Relapse Records.

In 2002, Daylight Dies released their debut studio album, No Reply. Afterwards, the band toured Europe with Katatonia and the United States and Canada with Lacuna Coil in support of the album. After the tour, Iddings left the band to pursue a career and Nathan Ellis replaced him. Charley Shackelford joined as a second guitarist. In November 2005, Daylight Dies signed with Candlelight Records and released their second studio album, Dismantling Devotion, in March 2006.

On July 13 and 14, 2006, Daylight Dies performed as main support for Emperor in New York City. The band premiered their first music video for the song "Lies That Bind" on August 9, 2006. Between October 20 and November 19, 2006, they embarked on their first full North American tour in support of Dismantling Devotion with Portugal's Moonspell and Sweden's Katatonia.

Daylight Dies entered the studio in December 2007 to record their third album, Lost to the Living. Like Dismantling Devotion, Jens Bogren mixed and mastered the album at Fascination Street Studios. After the album's release in 2008, the band supported it with two North American tours, one with Candlemass and another with Soilwork, Darkane and Swallow the Sun.

The band recorded their fourth and final album in late 2011, A Frail Becoming. Bogren mixed and mastered the album at Fascination Street Studios. It was released by Candlelight Records in 2012.

On July 28, 2026, Jesse Haff announced the disbanding of Daylight Dies on the band's Facebook page after Barre Gambling's exit from the band.

== Band members ==
=== Final lineup ===
- Nathan Ellis – harsh vocals (2004–2026)
- Barre Gambling – guitars (1996–2026), bass (2000)
- Charley Shackelford – guitars (2004–2026)
- Egan O'Rourke – bass, clean vocals (2001–2026)
- Jesse Haff – drums (1996–2026)

=== Former ===
- Matthew Golombisky – bass (1999), contrabass (2006, as sessionist), strings/woodwinds (2008, as sessionist)
- Guthrie Iddings – harsh vocals (2000–2004)

=== Session musicians ===
- Johnny Wooten – harsh vocals (1999)
- Robert Daugherty – live guitars (2003)

== Discography ==
=== Studio albums ===
- No Reply (2002, Relapse)
- Dismantling Devotion (2006, Candlelight)
- Lost to the Living (2008, Candlelight)
- A Frail Becoming (2012, Candlelight)

=== Singles ===
- "A Portrait in White" (2008, Candlelight)

=== Live albums ===
- Live at the Contamination Festival (2005, Relapse)

=== Demo ===
- The Long Forgotten (1999, Self-released/Independent)

Line up:

- Jesse Haff – drums
- Barre Gambling – guitars
- Matthew Golombisky – bass

Session:

- Johnny Wooten – harsh vocals

=== EP ===
- Idle (2000, Tribunal Records)

Line up:

- Barre Gambling – guitars, bass
- Jesse Haff – drums
- Guthrie Iddings – harsh vocals
