= Chaos Divine =

Australian progressive metal band

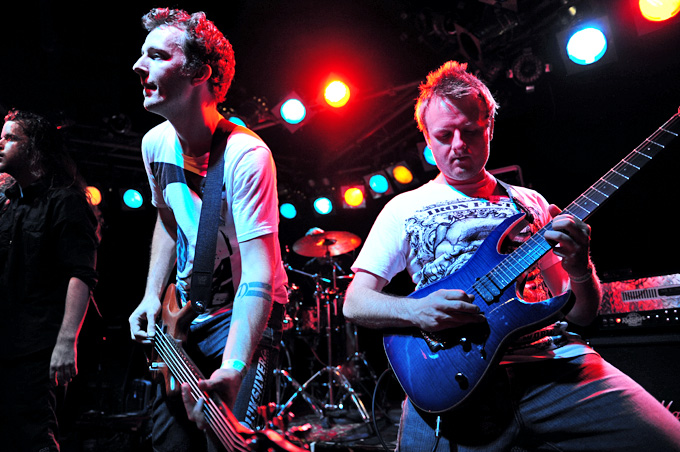

Background information
- Origin: Perth, Western Australia, Australia
- Genre: Progressive metal
- Years active: 2005–present
- Labels: Firestarter Music & Distribution
- Members: Simon Mitchell; David Anderton; Ryan Felton; Tim Stelter; Michael Kruit
- Past members: Chris Mitchell; Ben Mazzarol

Chaos Divine are an Australian progressive metal band from Perth, Western Australia. The band consists of vocalist David Anderton, guitarists Simon Mitchell and Ryan Felton, bassist Michael Kruit and drummer Tim Stelter. Since 2005, the band has released an EP, three studio albums and two singles.

== History ==
The 2006 Ratio EP, which saw the band tour nationally, was publicly voted as the second-best Australian metal release of its year on Triple J's Full Metal Racket program.

In late 2008, Chaos Divine completed their debut full-length debut album Avalon, recorded at Melbourne's Sing-Sing Studios and released nationally through Firestarter Music. The album went on to win the WAM Song of the Year Award in the Heavy Rock/Metal category with the track '"Refuse the Sickness".

Chaos Divine was also among the top-five finalists nominated for the Metal/Hardcore award at the National MusicOz awards held in Sydney and broadcast live to a national television audience, in both 2007 and 2008. Avalon was also voted in the top 10 international metal albums of the year by Triple J.

In 2009 the band joined the country's largest national music festival, the Big Day Out, and went on to tour Europe with an appearance at the Progpower Europe Festival in The Netherlands with a run of further dates through Belgium. Later that year, the band picked up five Australian Heavy Metal Awards (including best band) with a live performance at the Forum in Sydney during the awards show.

Since their formation, Chaos Divine has played alongside established metal acts such as Slayer and Trivium

On 25 March 2011, the band released their second full-length album, The Human Connection through Firestarter Music and Distribution. Recorded in Perth, Western Australia, the album was mixed and mastered by producer Jens Bogren of Fascination Street Studio, Sweden (Opeth, Symphony X, Katatonia).

On 9 September 2012, the band recorded and released a single containing a cover of the Toto smash hit "Africa". The single contained two b-side tracks, an acoustic version of the 2011 track "Beautiful Abyss" and a remix of the track "Astral Plane".

Following the late withdrawal of Volbeat at the Perth 2014 Soundwave Festival on 3 March 2014, Chaos Divine was added to the local line-up to perform at the festival.

The band released the first single from their third studio album entitled "Soldiers" on 31 October 2014. The single was recorded in Perth at Underground Studios and mixed and mastered by renowned music producer and engineer Forrester Savell.

The band's third studio album was released in March 2015 following a successful crowd-funding campaign which saw the band raise $15,000 towards the album's production and release.

== Members ==
- Ryan Felton – lead guitar (2005–present)
- Simon Mitchell – rhythm guitar (2005–present)
- Tim Stelter – drums (2017–present)
- David Anderton – lead vocals (2005–present)
- Michael Kruit – bass guitar (2005–present)

=== Former members ===
- Chris Mitchell – drums (2007–2008)
- Ben Mazzarol – drums (2005–2007, 2008–2017)

== Discography ==
=== Studio albums ===
Title	Details
Avalon	Released: September 2008; Label: Firestarter Music (FIRE2007008); Format: CD, digital download
The Human Connection	Released: March 2011; Label: Firestarter Music (FIRE0023); Format: CD, digital download
Colliding Skies	Released: March 2015; Label: Firestarter Music; Format: CD, LP digital download
Legacies	Released: October 2020; Label: Chaos Divine Music; Format: CD, LP digital download, streaming

=== EPs ===
Title	Details
Ratio	Released: 2006; Format: CD, digital download

== Awards ==
=== WAM Song of the Year ===
The WAM Song of the Year was formed by the Western Australian Rock Music Industry Association Inc. (WARMIA) in 1985, with its main aim to develop and run annual awards recognising achievements within the music industry in Western Australia.

Year	Nominee / work	Award	Result (wins only)
2008	"Refuse the Sickness"	Heavy Rock/Metal Song of the Year	Won
2014	"Soldiers"	Heavy Rock/Metal Song of the Year	Won
2015/16	"Badge of Honour"	Heavy Rock/Metal Song of the Year	Won
