= A Frail Becoming =

Studio album by Daylight Dies
- Released: October 9, 2012
- Recorded: late 2011/early 2012
- Genres: Death-doom, melodic death metal
- Length: 48:50
- Label: Candlelight Records

Daylight Dies chronology
Lost to the Living (2008)	A Frail Becoming (2012)

Professional ratings
Review scores
Source	Rating
AllMusic	link

A Frail Becoming is the fourth and final full-length album by Daylight Dies. It was released by Candlelight Records on October 9, 2012, four years after the release of the band's last album Lost to the Living. It was the last album released before Daylight Dies disbanded in 2026.

== Production and recording ==
Drummer Jesse Haff stated in an interview:

"A Frail Becoming is an album which, at many times during its creation, felt as if it may never be realized. As each of our lives proceeded down different paths, the challenges and obstacles we faced felt daunting and at times impassible. Out of this struggle we forged ahead, determined to write the best collection of music we've ever created. Thankfully our perseverance prevailed and A Frail Becoming stands as the most accomplished and varied album of our career."

The recording of A Frail Becoming commenced late 2011. Bassist/vocalist Egan O'Rourke coordinated capturing individual performances of Haff, guitarists Barre Gambling and Charley Shackelford, and vocalist Nathan Ellis.

Haff notes:

"While still sounding distinctly Daylight Dies, each songs stands independently on its own, uncompromisingly representing a reflection of the moment in time they were each born in. Expect beautiful and haunting guitar-driven dark metal, enveloped by a wall of rhythms and textures one minute, and deeply expressive guitar leads, solos and acoustic passages the next."

== Track listing ==
No.	Title	Length
1.	"Infidel"	5:20
2.	"The Pale Approach"	5:19
3.	"Sunset"	6:04
4.	"Dreaming of Breathing"	5:06
5.	"A Final Vestige"	5:46
6.	"Ghosting"	4:50
7.	"Hold On To Nothing"	6:09
8.	"Water's Edge"	1:33
9.	"An Heir to Emptiness"	8:43
Total length:		48:50

== Credits ==
- Nathan Ellis – harsh vocals
- Barre Gambling – guitars
- Charley Shackelford – guitars
- Egan O'Rourke – bass, clean vocals
- Jesse Haff – drums

== Production ==
- Jens Bogren – mixing (at Fascination Street Studios)
- Egan O'Rourke - production and engineering
- Jeff Dunne - drum editing
- Jonathan Mehring – photography
- Agni Kaster – packaging design
