= Kontinuum =

Icelandic rock band

- Origin: Reykjavík, Iceland
- Genres: Progressive metal; post-metal; gothic rock
- Years active: 2010–present
- Labels: Candlelight Records; Season of Mist
- Members: Birgir Thorgeirsson; Engilbert Hauksson; Ingi Þór Pálsson; Erik Quick; Thorlakur Thor Gudmundsson
- Past members: Kristján Einar Guðmundsson; Kristján B. Heiðarsson

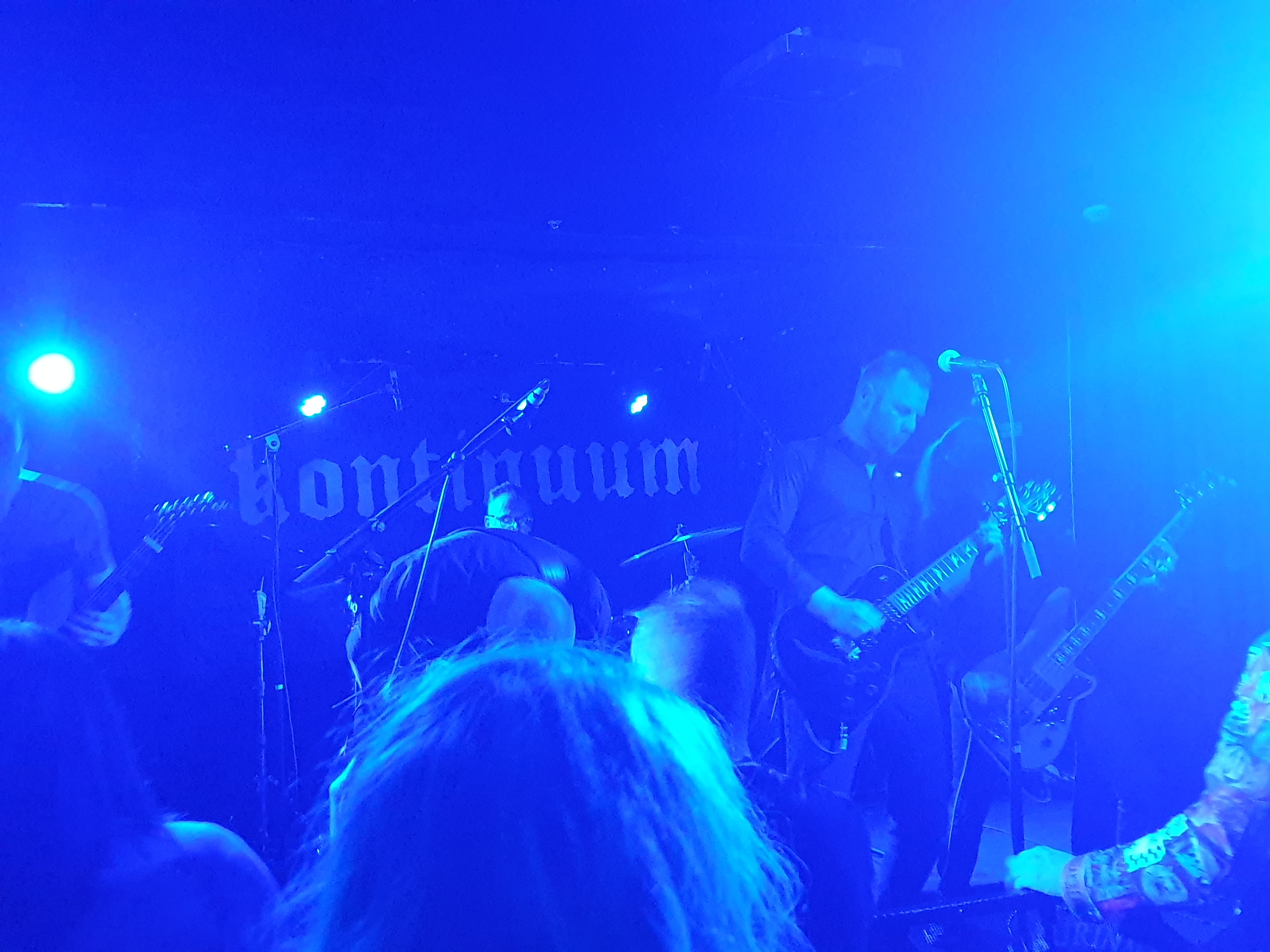
Kontinuum, gig in Reykjavík 2021

Kontinuum is an Icelandic rock band. It is made up of Birgir Thorgeirsson, Engilbert Hauksson, Ingi Þór Pálsson, Erik Quick and Thorlakur Thor Gudmundsson.

The band was formed in Reykjavík in 2010 and started recording materials for their first album, Earth Blood Magic, released in 2012 receiving critical acclaim, and selected Icelandic Rock Album of the Year by Morgunblaðið newspaper. Kontinuum released their second album, Kyrr, in April, 2015. The bands third album, No Need to Reason was released in 2018

== Discography ==
=== Albums ===
- 2012: Earth Blood Magic
- 2015: Kyrr
- 2018: No Need to Reason

=== Singles ===
- 2012: "Steinrunninn Skógur"
- 2012: "Moonshine"
- 2014: "Í Huldusal"
- 2014: "Breathe"
- 2018: "Two Moons"
- 2020: "Shivers"
- 2021: "Hjartavél"
- 2022: "Hafið Logar"
