= Between the Buried and Me discography =

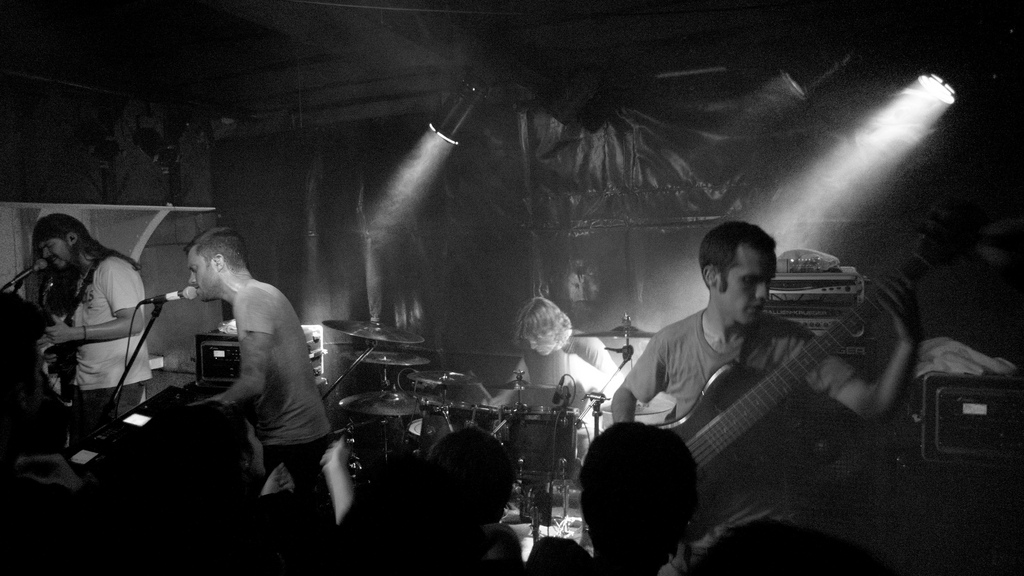
- Between the Buried and Me in 2010
- Studio albums: 10
- Extended plays: 1
- Live albums: 4
- Compilation albums: 2
- Singles: 1
- Music videos: 7
- Demo albums: 1

Between the Buried and Me is a North Carolina-based progressive metalcore band. The discography of the group has seen a shift from a short, song-based approach in their earlier albums to a more conceptual approach in their later offerings. The band has been known throughout their career for employing a wide variety of musical styles in their compositions, often combining them with technically demanding playing.

== Albums ==
=== Studio albums ===
List of studio albums, with selected chart positions
Title	Album details	Peak chart positions									
Title	Album details	US	US Heat.	US Indie.	US Rock	US Hard Rock	GER	JPN	SCO	SWI	UK
Between the Buried and Me	Released: April 30, 2002; Label: Lifeforce; Formats: CD, digital download	—	—	—	—	—	—	—	—	—	—
The Silent Circus (Note: Later re-released with bonus tracks by Victory Records.)	Released: October 21, 2003; Label: Victory; Formats: CD, digital download	—	—	—	—	—	—	—	—	—	—
Alaska (Note: Later re-released as a purely instrumental version but missing the third, sixth, and seventh tracks from the original album.)	Released: September 6, 2005; Label: Victory; Formats: CD, digital download	121	2	12	—	—	—	—	—	—	—
Colors	Released: September 18, 2007; Label: Victory; Formats: CD, digital download	57	—	5	15	6	—	—	—	—	—
The Great Misdirect	Released: October 27, 2009; Label: Victory; Formats: CD, digital download	36	—	7	14	6	—	—	—	—	—
The Parallax II: Future Sequence	Released: October 9, 2012; Label: Metal Blade; Formats: CD, digital download	22	—	5	7	3	—	—	—	—	—
Coma Ecliptic	Released: July 10, 2015; Label: Metal Blade; Formats: CD, digital download	12	—	2	1	1	53	205	42	—	74
Automata I	Released: March 9, 2018; Label: Sumerian; Formats: CD, digital download	35	—	1	7	4	—	—	—	88	—
Automata II	Released: July 13, 2018; Label: Sumerian; Formats: CD, digital download	65	—	1	8	3	—	—	—	69	—
Colors II	Released: August 20, 2021; Label: Sumerian; Formats: CD, digital download	—	—	—	—	—	62	—	75	54	—
The Blue Nowhere	Released: September 12, 2025; Label: Inside Out; Formats: CD, digital download	—	—	—	—	—	—	—	—	—	—
"—" denotes a recording that did not chart.

=== Cover albums ===
List of cover albums
Title	Album details
The Anatomy Of	Released: June 13, 2006 (US); Label: Victory; Formats: CD, LP, digital download

=== Live albums ===
List of live albums, with selected chart positions
Title	Album details	Peak chart positions		
Title	Album details	US	US Indie.	US Hard Rock
Colors_LIVE	Released: October 14, 2008; Label: Victory; Formats: CD, digital download	100	12	18
Future Sequence: Live at the Fidelitorium	Released: September 30, 2014; Label: Metal Blade; Formats: CD, DVD	—	—	—
Coma Ecliptic: Live	Released: April 28, 2017; Label: Metal Blade; Formats: CD, DVD, Blu-ray, Vinyl	—	—	—
The Great Misdirect: Live	Released: June 13, 2022; Label: Sumerian; Formats: Vinyl	—	—	—
"—" denotes a recording that did not chart.

=== Compilation albums ===
- Dead and Dreaming: An Indie Tribute to Counting Crows (Victory, 2004) – "Colorblind"
- Best Of (2011)

== EPs ==
List of EPs, with selected chart positions
Title	Album details	Peak chart positions			
Title	Album details	US	US Indie.	US Rock	US Hard Rock
The Parallax: Hypersleep Dialogues	Released: April 12, 2011; Label: Metal Blade; Formats: CD, digital download	54	8	16	5

== Singles ==
- "Obfuscation" (2009)
- "Bohemian Rhapsody" / "Vertical Beta 461" (2016)
- "The Tank" / "Rapid Calm" split with The Dear Hunter (2018)

=== Other appearances ===
Title	Year	Band	Album
"Jellybelly"	2026	The Smashing Pumpkins	Sending Hearts To All My Dearies: A Tribute To The Smashing Pumpkins

== Music videos ==
Year	Title	Director(s)
2002	"Aspirations"	Ian Larson
2004	"Mordecai"	—
2005	"Alaska"	Shane Drake
2009	"Obfuscation"	Kevin McVey
2012	"Astral Body"	Wes Richardson
2013	"Lay Your Ghosts to Rest"	Raymond McCrea Jones, Wes Richardson
2015	"The Coma Machine"	Wes Richardson
2018	"Condemned to the Gallows"	—
2018	"Millions"	Wes Richardson
2021	"Fix The Error"	Tony Celano
2021	"The Future Is Behind Us"	Erez Bader
2025	"Things We Tell Ourselves In The Dark"	Miles Skarin
2025	"The Blue Nowhere"	Mirko Witzki
"—" denotes currently unknown information
