= Best Of (Between the Buried and Me album) =

Greatest hits album by Between the Buried and Me
- Released: March 29, 2011
- Length: 132:01
- Label: Victory (#627)
- Producer: Between the Buried and Me; Matthew Ellard; Jamie King

Between the Buried and Me chronology
The Great Misdirect (2009)	Best Of (2011)	The Parallax: Hypersleep Dialogues (2011)

Best Of is a greatest hits compilation album by the American progressive metal band Between the Buried and Me. The three-disc CD/DVD set was released by Victory Records on March 29, 2011. Best Of was also released shortly after the announcement of Between the Buried and Me's signing to Metal Blade Records. The album's packaging features several hidden images that can be revealed by using a decoder.

Jason Lymangrover of Allmusic gave the album three and a half out of five stars, and stated, "Boasting two discs and a bonus DVD with four music videos, as well as some slick packaging, it's a nice collector's item for fans, and a good jumping-off point for people looking to get their feet wet with one of the most versatile prog-metalcore groups in the business." However, Lymangrover also said, "it's not quite the full experience because BTBAM's impressive first self-titled album is not included, and the band's albums often play conceptually from front to end, but these are minor complaints."

== Track listing ==
All tracks are written by Between the Buried and Me.

Disc 1 (CD)
No.	Title	Original release (Year)	Length
1.	"Mordecai"	The Silent Circus (2003)	5:46
2.	"Ad a Dglgmut"	The Silent Circus (2003)	7:38
3.	"Aesthetic"	The Silent Circus (2003)	3:47
4.	"Shevanel Take 2"	The Silent Circus (2003)	3:15
5.	"Alaska"	Alaska (2005)	3:59
6.	"Selkies: The Endless Obsession"	Alaska (2005)	7:23
7.	"All Bodies"	Alaska (2005)	6:12
8.	"Backwards Marathon"	Alaska (2005)	8:30
9.	"Foam Born A: The Backtrack"	Colors (2007)	2:13
10.	"Foam Born B: The Decade of Statues"	Colors (2007)	5:21
11.	"Prequel to the Sequel"	Colors (2007)	8:36
12.	"Viridian"	Colors (2007)	2:51
13.	"White Walls"	Colors (2007)	14:11
Total length:			79:42

Disc 2 (CD)
No.	Title	Original release (Year)	Length
1.	"Mirrors"	The Great Misdirect (2009)	3:36
2.	"Obfuscation"	The Great Misdirect (2009)	9:05
3.	"Mordecai" (live)	Colors Live (2008)	5:33
4.	"Shevanel Cut a Flip" (live)	Colors Live (2008)	6:55
5.	"Backwards Marathon" (live)	Colors Live (2008)	9:03
6.	"Ad a Dglgmut" (live)	Colors Live (2008)	8:11
7.	"Selkies: The Endless Obsession" (live)	Colors Live (2008)	9:56
Total length:			52:19

Disc 3 (DVD)
No.	Title	Length
1.	"Mordecai" (music video)	6:07
2.	"Alaska" (music video)	3:58
3.	"Obfuscation" (music video)	9:24
4.	"Synesthesia" (Colors companion film)	64:13
