= Colors Live =

Video by Between the Buried and Me
- Released: October 14, 2008
- Recorded: August 2, 2008
- Venue: Rocketown, Nashville, Tennessee
- Label: Victory
- Producer: Jamie King; Shane Holloman

Between the Buried and Me chronology
Colors (2007)	Colors Live (2008)	The Great Misdirect (2009)

Professional ratings
Review scores
Source	Rating
Allmusic	3.5/5 stars

Colors Live (stylized as Colors_LIVE) is the first video album by the American progressive metal band Between the Buried and Me. It was released on October 14, 2008. The concert was filmed at the Rocketown in Nashville, Tennessee on Friday, August 2, 2008. The album peaked at number 100 on the Billboard 200 chart.

The band played two sets during the concert—the first included the band's 2007 Colors album in its entirety and the second was of previously released songs as voted by fans via a special website. The DVD includes both sets. The audio CD contains only the band's performance of Colors.

The DVD is mixed in Dolby Stereo, contrary to the most current live releases which make heavy use of surround sound. There is a slideshow on the DVD including photography from David Shaw and Eric Dale; both photographers took all photography for the CD and DVD.

== Track listing ==
DVD

Set 1:

1. "Foam Born (A) The Backtrack"
2. "(B) The Decade of Statues"
3. "Informal Gluttony"
4. "Sun of Nothing"
5. "Ants of the Sky"
6. "Prequel to the Sequel"
7. "Viridian"
8. "White Walls"

Set 2:

1. "Mordecai" (from The Silent Circus)
2. "Shevanel Cut a Flip" (from Self-titled album)
3. "Backwards Marathon" (from Alaska)
4. "Ad a Dglgmut" (from The Silent Circus)
5. "Aspirations" (from Self-titled album)
6. "Selkies: The Endless Obsession" (from Alaska)

== Track listing ==
CD

Lyrics written by Tommy Giles Rogers Jr. Music written by Between the Buried and Me.

No.	Title	Length
1.	"Foam Born (A) The Backtrack"	3:12
2.	"(B) The Decade of Statues"	5:20
3.	"Informal Gluttony"	6:47
4.	"Sun of Nothing"	10:59
5.	"Ants of the Sky"	13:10
6.	"Prequel to the Sequel"	9:08
7.	"Viridian"	2:05
8.	"White Walls"	15:31
Total length:		66:12

== Personnel ==
Between the Buried and Me

- Tommy Giles Rogers Jr. – lead vocals, keyboards
- Paul Waggoner – guitars, backing vocals
- Dustie Waring – guitars
- Dan Briggs – bass, backing vocals
- Blake Richardson – drums, percussion

Technical personnel

- Jamie King – mixing, production
- Shane Holloman – film director, production
- Michael Quinlan – assistant director
- April Kimbrell – film producer
- Craig Hill – film producer
- James Pickett – dolly grip
- Kyle Spicer – camera
- Phillip Allen – camera
- Trevor Wild – camera
- Wes Richardson – camera
- Kyle Rullmann – dolly camera
- United Saints – filming
- Courtney Warner – sound engineering
- Chuck Johnson – lighting
- Jimmy Chang – technician, stage manager
- Brandon Proff – artwork
- CK Cates – photography director
- David Shaw – photography
- Eric Dale – photography
