= Colors II =

Studio album by Between the Buried and Me
- Released: August 20, 2021
- Recorded: 2020
- Studio: The Basement Studios, Winston-Salem, North Carolina
- Genre: Progressive metal; technical death metal; progressive rock
- Length: 78:40
- Label: Sumerian
- Producer: Jamie King, Between the Buried and Me

Between the Buried and Me chronology
Automata II (2018)	Colors II (2021)	The Blue Nowhere (2025)

Singles from Colors II
- 1. "Fix the Error" Released: June 25, 2021; 2. "Revolution in Limbo" Released: July 23, 2021

Colors II is the tenth studio album by the American progressive metal band Between the Buried and Me. It was released on August 20, 2021 through Sumerian Records, their second and final release with the label, after the two-part album Automata I and II. It serves as a direct follow-up to their 2007 album Colors. It is also the band's last album to feature rhythm guitarist Dustie Waring after his dismissal from the band in 2023.

== Background ==
In regards of the conception of the album, vocalist Tommy Giles Rogers Jr. explained:

Especially with 2020, we really wanted to give it all we could and show the world we’re still here. That’s part of the reason we named it Colors II. We were in a similar spot when we did the first Colors. Back then, we had just gotten done with Ozzfest. We were wondering, 'Where do we belong in this music scene?' We still struggle with that. At both of these moments in our career, we decided to just be ourselves and write the best album we can. We came out guns blazing, and I feel like it’s some of our most creative material in a long time.

Guitarist Paul Waggoner added:

Colors was very much our attempt at a do-or-die statement. We had to establish our identity and be who we really wanted to be in order to have a career. This time around, our industry was shut down for a year. Once tours were canceled due to the pandemic, we were like, 'We've got to write a record, and it's got to be good'. We had to do something next level.

== Concept ==
About the concept, Rogers commented:

Musically, it flows like a sequel to Colors, but it wasn’t just another version of that album. On the original, I was analyzing myself and analyzing humanity. With last year, I was in a perfect position to do that. I wrote lyrics in the same way, but they felt new. It was more of a real-world concept by virtue of making a continuation. Music’s purpose is to help. That's a big theme of this album. Once our songs are done, they belong to our listeners. Maybe this will help them move forward creatively or in life.

And about the track "Fix the Error", he shared:

The intention was to write a metal song with a big gospel vibe. It turned into this monster. It's a small story on the record about this guy who lives in a big apocalyptic city. He retires from his job, but he wants to take down this huge corporation. The song is a celebration of taking down corruption and saying, 'Fuck you', to the man. It's about as punk as we’ll ever get.

== Release and promotion ==
The first single "Fix the Error" was released on June 25, 2021. An animated music video was released for the song on July 7, 2021, animated by Tony Celano. The second single "Revolution in Limbo" was released on July 23, 2021. A music video for "The Future Is Behind Us" was released on August 20, 2021, the same date as the album release.

== Critical reception ==
Professional ratings
Aggregate scores
Source	Rating
Metacritic	68/100
Review scores
Source	Rating
Blabbermouth.net	8/10
Distorted Sound	9/10
Exclaim!	7/10
Kerrang!	4/5
Metal Hammer	4.5/5 stars
Metal Injection	9.5/10

The album received generally positive reviews from music critics upon its release. On review aggregator Metacritic, the album holds a score of 68 out of 100 based on four reviews.

Kerrang! gave the album 4 out of 5 with writer James Hickie stating: "Unsurprisingly, at 80 minutes long, and with exhaustive closing track 'Human Is Hell (Another One with Love)' taking up 15 of those, it's entirely too much music to wrestle with on cursory listens, and requires serious dedication, though that's no bad thing in an age when streaming has fundamentally altered the attention span. As a result, the uninitiated are likely to be overwhelmed by such a glut of material, particularly when it takes so many stylistic detours and about-turns. It's worth the endeavour, though, because there's some sublime music here, deep and diverse, which has plenty to offer nerds and newbies alike."

Metal Hammer gave the album a positive review, stating: "In being so loyal to the structure of what's come before, Colors II doesn't reinvent progressive metal like its predecessor, but by all other metrics, it lives up to its lineage. It's the only album to ever recapture Colors' brand of restlessness, reaffirming that BTBAM are once-in-a-lifetime masterminds."

=== Accolades ===
Publication	Accolade	Rank
Consequence	Top 30 Metal & Hard Rock Albums	23
Loudwire	The 45 Best Rock + Metal Albums of 2021	18
Metal Hammer	Top 10 Prog Metal Albums of 2021	5
PopMatters	The 75 Best Albums of 2021	58
PopMatters	The 10 Best Progressive Rock/Metal Albums of 2021	1
Prog	Top 20 Albums of 2021	18
Loudwire	The 35 Best Metal Songs of 2021 ("Fix the Error")	21

== Track listing ==
No.	Title	Length
1.	"Monochrome"	3:14
2.	"The Double Helix of Extinction"	6:16
3.	"Revolution in Limbo"	9:12
4.	"Fix the Error"	5:00
5.	"Never Seen / Future Shock"	11:41
6.	"Stare into the Abyss"	3:53
7.	"Prehistory"	3:07
8.	"Bad Habits"	8:43
9.	"The Future Is Behind Us"	5:22
10.	"Turbulent"	5:56
11.	"Sfumato" (Instrumental)	1:09
12.	"Human Is Hell (Another One with Love)"	15:07
Total length:		78:40

== Personnel ==
Credits for Colors II adapted from liner notes.

Between the Buried and Me

- Tommy Giles Rogers Jr. – vocals, keyboards
- Paul Waggoner – lead guitar
- Dustie Waring – rhythm guitar
- Dan Briggs – bass, keyboards
- Blake Richardson – drums, harsh vocals on "Revolution in Limbo"

Additional musicians

- Mike Portnoy – first drum solo on "Fix the Error"
- Navene Koperweis – second drum solo on "Fix the Error"
- Ken Schalk – third drum solo on "Fix the Error"

Production

- Jamie King – production, engineering
- Jens Bogren – mixing
- Richardo Borges – mixing
- Tony Lindgren – mastering
- Corey Meyers – photography, layout, design
- Jason Prushko – engineering
- Thomas Cuce – engineering
- Aaron Strelecki – photography

== Charts ==
Chart performance for Colors II
Chart (2021)	Peak position
German Albums (Offizielle Top 100)	62
Scottish Albums (OCC)	75
Swiss Albums (Schweizer Hitparade)	54
UK Independent Albums (OCC)	24
UK Rock & Metal Albums (OCC)	10
