= Coma Ecliptic =

Studio album by Between the Buried and Me
- Released: July 10, 2015
- Genre: Progressive metal; progressive rock
- Length: 68:31
- Label: Metal Blade
- Producer: Jamie King

Between the Buried and Me chronology
The Parallax II: Future Sequence (2012)	Coma Ecliptic (2015)	Automata I (2018)

Professional ratings
Aggregate scores
Source	Rating
Metacritic	73/100
Review scores
Source	Rating
Allmusic	4/5 stars
Alternative Press	4/5 stars
Consequence of Sound	C−
Exclaim!	8/10
The Guardian	5/5 stars
Kerrang!	2/5 stars
PopMatters	9/10 stars

Coma Ecliptic is the seventh studio album by the American progressive metal band Between the Buried and Me, released on July 10, 2015 through Metal Blade Records. The band first announced the album through Twitter on September 8, 2014 saying "It has begun! #rockopera". Similar to previous releases by the band, Coma Ecliptic is a concept album. The first single, "Memory Palace" was released on April 3, 2015.

== Overview ==
The band has stated that the concept of Coma Ecliptic involves a man stuck in a coma, journeying through his past lives. It was added that the man faces a choice to either stay or move on to something better. Each song is its own episode in a fashion similar to "The Twilight Zone".

Coma Ecliptic is notably the first album since 2005's Alaska to feature no songs over 10 minutes in length, although the track "Memory Palace" is close to the mark, clocking in at 9:54. This album also has a smaller emphasis on growling compared to other albums. Vocalist Tommy Rogers decided to use clean vocals more frequently, as he felt they better fit the tone of the songs being written.

== Reception ==
The album received generally positive reviews from professional critics. Review aggregator Metacritic scored the album a 73 out of 100 based on 7 music critics, citing 'generally favorable reviews'. Thom Jurek of Allmusic gave the album a positive review saying, "Coma Ecliptic holds together as an album. Despite, and perhaps because of, its relative accessibility it is exceptionally creative. Ultimately, Between the Buried & Me, despite employing many tropes and influences, come off sounding like no one but themselves." Calum Slingerland of Exclaim! opined, "While the noticeable shift away from death metal may discourage some, Coma Ecliptic succeeds in pushing Between the Buried and Me's creativity in a new direction, avoiding a simple rehash of their winning formula."

Dom Lawson from The Guardian gave the album a perfect rating calling it "ingenious, sprawling prog-metal" and saying "From the rock opera crescendos of the opening "Node" onwards, the album dares to be both a quintessentially prog-rock experience and a timely act of modern metal derring-do." Chris Cope of Prog added that "at its best, Coma Ecliptic holds some of this band’s most impressive moments to date."

Some opinions were generally mixed on the band's shift away from technical death metal on Coma Ecliptic. Jon Hadusek of Consequence of Sound gave the album a rating of C−, saying, "Coma Ecliptic clocks in at over an hour, but most discouraging is the band’s failure to translate the album’s conceptual themes to the listener in that timespan." Kerrang! received the album negatively: "They're suspended in an airy updraft of synths and clean guitar lines that are so '70s prog-rock they should be wearing a Rick Wakeman from Yes-styled cape."

== Appearances ==
The second track "The Coma Machine" is featured and available as downloadable content in the game Rock Band 4.

== Track listing ==
All tracks are written by Between the Buried and Me.

No.	Title	Length
1.	"Node"	3:31
2.	"The Coma Machine"	7:35
3.	"Dim Ignition"	2:16
4.	"Famine Wolf"	6:50
5.	"King Redeem/Queen Serene"	6:58
6.	"Turn on the Darkness"	8:26
7.	"The Ectopic Stroll"	7:02
8.	"Rapid Calm"	7:59
9.	"Memory Palace"	9:54
10.	"Option Oblivion"	4:22
11.	"Life in Velvet"	3:38
Total length:		68:31

== Personnel ==
=== Between the Buried and Me ===
- Dan Briggs – bass, keyboards, backing vocals
- Blake Richardson – drums, percussion
- Tommy Giles Rogers Jr. – vocals, keyboards
- Paul Waggoner – lead guitar, vocals on "Turn on the Darkness"
- Dustie Waring – rhythm guitar

=== Additional personnel ===
- Jamie King – production
- Jens Bogren – mixing

== Charts ==
Chart (2015)	Peak position
Canadian Albums (Billboard)	17
Japanese Albums (Oricon)	–
German Albums (Offizielle Top 100)	53
Scottish Albums (OCC)	42
UK Albums (OCC)	74
US Billboard 200	12
US Top Rock Albums (Billboard)	1
US Top Hard Rock Albums (Billboard)	1
US Indie Store Album Sales (Billboard)	1
US Independent Albums (Billboard)	2
