= The Blue Nowhere =

Studio album by Between the Buried and Me
- Released: September 12, 2025
- Genres: Progressive metal; technical death metal; progressive rock; metalcore
- Length: 71:20
- Label: InsideOut Music
- Producers: Between the Buried and Me

Between the Buried and Me chronology
| Colors II (2021) | The Blue Nowhere (2025) |

Singles from The Blue Nowhere
- 1. "Things We Tell Ourselves In The Dark" Released: June 12, 2025; 2. "Absent Thereafter" Released: July 24, 2025; 3. "The Blue Nowhere" Released: September 4, 2025

The Blue Nowhere is the eleventh studio album by the American progressive metal band Between the Buried and Me. It was released on September 12, 2025 through InsideOut Music, their first release with the label. It is also their first album without member Dustie Waring since their 2005 release Alaska, and their first as a four-piece band. The song "Things We Tell Ourselves In The Dark" serves as the first single for the band released with a musical video on June 12, 2025. The four-year gap is the longest the band has had between studio albums, since the release of Colors II in 2021.

It was elected by Loudwire as one of the 11 best progressive metal albums of 2025.

== Background ==
Vocalist Tommy Giles Rogers explained about approaching the concept of the album without having one:

[the 10-track collection] exists in a world that’s not tied to a storyline. It’s more about a feeling, where the songs live for me.” [He describes the lyrical approach to The Blue Nowhere] as “journal entries, fleeting and introspective thoughts – chaotic at times, depending on the music.

In regards of their first single, Rogers shared:

This track emerged from the maniac genius of Dan Briggs. The song deals with the dark cloud that is ego, so I tried to vocally approach it with a different kind of confidence than normal, almost like a pop song… even though it takes you down crazy avenues, you can sit back and sing along.

Bassist Dan Briggs added:

It’s one of the rare songs I started around the bass and that foundational funky idea, while also maintaining a pretty straightforward melodic idea underneath everything, no matter how dense it got rhythmically. I love when we have arrangements that feel like they have a page turn into another dimension, but I thought it was important for this one to feel really seamless as it moved dynamically. Even when it gets heavy, I thought it’d be fun at the core to still feel like it was Prince’s band playing, keeping it funky.

== Track listing ==
All lyrics are written by Tommy Rogers; all music is composed by Dan Briggs, Blake Richardson, Rogers, and Paul Waggoner.

The Blue Nowhere track listing
| No. | Title | Length |
|---|---|---|
| 1. | "Things We Tell Ourselves in the Dark" | 7:59 |
| 2. | "God Terror" | 6:41 |
| 3. | "Absent Thereafter" | 10:28 |
| 4. | "Pause" | 2:49 |
| 5. | "Door #3" | 5:58 |
| 6. | "Mirador Uncoil" | 0:52 |
| 7. | "Psychomanteum" | 11:12 |
| 8. | "Slow Paranoia" | 11:28 |
| 9. | "The Blue Nowhere" | 6:01 |
| 10. | "Beautifully Human" | 7:52 |
| Total length: | | 71:20 |

Deluxe vinyl and Bandcamp edition bonus track
| No. | Title | Length |
|---|---|---|
| 11. | "Overture" | 4:08 |

== Personnel ==
Credits adapted from Tidal.

=== Between the Buried and Me ===
- Dan Briggs – bass, bass synthesizer, keyboards, production (all tracks); upright bass (tracks 4–6), acoustic guitar (4, 7, 9, 10), sitar (8)
- Blake Richardson – drums, percussion, production
- Tommy Giles Rogers – vocals, keyboards, production
- Paul Waggoner – guitars, production (all tracks); acoustic guitar (4, 5, 7, 9, 10)

=== Additional musicians ===
- Walter Fancourt – saxophone (3), bass clarinet (7)
- John Wiseman – trumpet (3)
- Susan Mandel – cello (6, 8, 10)
- Adam Kramer – viola (6, 8, 10)
- Taya Ricker – violin (6, 8, 10)
- Carmen Granger – violin (8, 10)
- Baron Thor Young – bassoon (6, 8)
- Kate Serbinowski – clarinet (6, 8)
- Isabel Aviles – flute (6, 8)
- Ger Vang – oboe (6, 8)
- Ray Hearne – tuba (6, 8)

=== Technical personnel ===
- Jamie King – co-production, engineering
- Jens Bogren – mixing
- Tony Lindgren – mastering

== Charts ==
Chart performance for The Blue Nowhere
| Chart (2025) | Peak position |
|---|---|
| French Rock & Metal Albums (SNEP) | 31 |
| German Albums (Offizielle Top 100) | 78 |
| UK Albums Sales (OCC) | 80 |
| UK Rock & Metal Albums (Official Charts) | 14 |
| US Top Album Sales (Billboard) | 18 |
