= Automata I =

Studio album by Between the Buried and Me
- Released: March 9, 2018
- Recorded: August–September 2017
- Studios: The Basement Studios, Winston-Salem, North Carolina
- Genres: Progressive metal; technical death metal
- Length: 35:13
- Label: Sumerian
- Producers: Jamie King, Between the Buried and Me

Between the Buried and Me chronology
Coma Ecliptic (2015)	Automata I (2018)	Automata II (2018)

Automata I is the eighth studio album by the American progressive metal band Between the Buried and Me. It was released on March 9, 2018, through Sumerian Records, their first release with the label. It is the first part of a two-piece album; the second, Automata II, was released on July 13, 2018.

Between the Buried and Me began recording the album on July 31, 2017, and finished on September 6, 2017, announcing it in January 2018 with 2018 tour dates set with The Dear Hunter and Leprous. Longtime producer and collaborator Jamie King returned to produce the album.

A music video for "Condemned to the Gallows" was released on January 19, 2018. On March 9, 2018, the band released the second music video from the album for the song, "Millions". The album was released later that same day.

== Background ==
About the album, guitarist Paul Waggoner remarked:

We never want to repeat ourselves. We're always trying to do something different, and this album fell right into that sort of pattern. We push ourselves into new places, while retaining our basic sound. Musically, we go somewhere that's fun and challenging. We never know how it's going to turn out. These are uncharted waters for us. We've never written an entire piece and presented it in separate parts like this.

== Concept ==
Automata is a concept album. According to an official press release, the album will revolve around the concept of being able to view the dreams of others, frontman Tommy Rogers commented:

What if dreams could be broadcast for the purpose of entertainment? Could you consume the innermost thoughts of another person on screen? If you could, what does that say about an attention-starved audience? More importantly, what would become of the dreamer?

During an interview with That Drummer Guy, he also added:

The protagonist in the story... his dreams are broadcast over the entire world as a form of entertainment and because of this he is taken advantage of by a company called "Voice of Trespass". It follows one of his dreams where he is searching for a family that he's lost, [...] all those different aspects of the story and deals a lot with his personal well-being, corruption, depression, the audience's perspective on the whole thing, [...] it showcases his life in a way and things that he deals with.

== Reception ==
Professional ratings
Aggregate scores
Source	Rating
Metacritic	70/100
Review scores
Source	Rating
AllMusic	3.5/5 stars
The A.V. Club	C+
Exclaim!	8/10
Metal Injection	9/10
MetalSucks	4/5 stars
PopMatters	8/10 stars
Team Rock	4/5 stars

Automata I received generally positive reviews from professional critics, noting the band's continued technical proficiency found in their previous albums, while some felt ambivalent of the album's significantly shorter length—drawing comparisons to their 2011 extended play, The Parallax: Hypersleep Dialogues, which is five minutes shorter—and the band's decision to release Automata in two parts. Review aggregator Metacritic scored the album a 70 out of 100 based on five music critics, citing "generally favorable reviews".

The Prog Report praised the album, referring to the song "Blot" as a "song [that] brings all the elements which one would expect—it doesn't disappoint", comparing the track with the sound of bands like Haken and Nova Collective (bassist Dan Briggs being a member of this band). They also add that the song "shines as it has everything BTBAM has to offer at the highest level of musical performance. The ending chorus is epic; but, just when you think a conclusion is due, the abrupt ending reminds us the second part is just a few months away..."

MetalSucks's Phil Boozeman gave the album 4 devil horns claiming "Automata is also a perfect jumping-on spot for new fans, as it winds up being one of the band's easiest-to-digest releases" and that "Musically, BTBAM are already in outer space while every other metal band remains stuck on earth — and yet Automata finds the band somehow continuing to push themselves in new territory". He also added that the song "Blot" "may very well represent BTBAM's strongest work to date".

== Track listing ==
All tracks are written by Tommy Giles Rogers Jr., Dan Briggs, Blake Richardson, Dustie Waring and Paul Waggoner

No.	Title	Length
1.	"Condemned to the Gallows"	6:35
2.	"House Organ"	3:41
3.	"Yellow Eyes"	8:45
4.	"Millions"	4:43
5.	"Gold Distance" (instrumental)	1:02
6.	"Blot"	10:27
Total length:		35:13

== Personnel ==
=== Between the Buried and Me ===
- Dan Briggs – bass, keyboards
- Blake Richardson – drums
- Tommy Giles Rogers Jr. – vocals, keyboards
- Paul Waggoner – guitars
- Dustie Waring – guitars

=== Additional personnel ===
- Jamie King – production, engineering, piano
- Kris Hilbert – piano, additional drum production
- Jens Bogren – mixing, mastering
- Kevin King – additional production
- Cameron MacManus – trombone, baritone saxophone
- Jonathan Wiseman – trumpet
- Corey Meyers – art direction, layout, photography
- Aaron Strelecki – photography
- Andrew Strelecki – photography

== Charts ==
Chart (2018)	Peak position
Swiss Albums (Schweizer Hitparade)	88
US Billboard 200	35
US Independent Albums (Billboard)	1
US Top Hard Rock Albums (Billboard)	4
US Top Rock Albums (Billboard)	7
