= The Great Misdirect =

Studio album by Between the Buried and Me
- Released: October 27, 2009
- Recorded: June 1 – July 2, 2009
- Studios: Basement Studios in Winston-Salem, North Carolina
- Genres: Progressive metal; technical death metal; metalcore
- Length: 59:35
- Label: Victory
- Producers: Between the Buried and Me; Jamie King

Between the Buried and Me chronology
Colors Live (2008)	The Great Misdirect (2009)	Best Of (2011)

Singles from The Great Misdirect
- 1. "Obfuscation" Released: September 29, 2009

Professional ratings
Aggregate scores
Source	Rating
Metacritic	64/100
Review scores
Source	Rating
Allmusic	3/5 stars
Alternative Press	3/5 stars
Exclaim!	(favorable)
Fangoria	4/4 stars
Rock on Request	(favorable)
Slant Magazine	3/5 stars
Sputnikmusic	(4/5)

The Great Misdirect is the fifth studio album by the American progressive metal band Between the Buried and Me. It was released on October 27, 2009 through Victory Records and was produced by Jamie King. Despite containing only six tracks, the album reaches nearly an hour in total time length. The album contains their longest song, "Swim to the Moon", which surpasses 17 minutes. Frontman Tommy Giles Rogers described The Great Misdirect as "some of the best material we've ever created."

== Background and production ==
Between the Buried and Me began recording for The Great Misdirect during the summer of 2009. On August 31, the band released a four-minute teaser of the album containing various short clips of the album's songs onto their MySpace profile. On September 1, the band played a new song entitled "Obfuscation" as well as "Disease, Injury, Madness" at the Lincoln Theatre in Raleigh, North Carolina.

Rogers has stated that the nearly 18-minute-long closing song "Swim to the Moon" is - in some ways - a companion piece to "Sun of Nothing", a song featured on their previous album, Colors. This song is the prequel to the "Parallax Saga" following this album, The Parallax: Hypersleep Dialogues and The Parallax II: Future Sequence.

The Great Misdirect also features their lead guitarist Paul Waggoner performing opening vocals on "Desert of Song" and Chuck Johnson performing vocals on "Swim to the Moon". A backwards message is included in the song "Disease, Injury, Madness" at 3:17-3:37. It is difficult to hear over the acoustic guitar riffs, but a voice is heard saying "You will sleep with the rest of the non-believers... If you disagree you will sleep... You will sleep with the rest of the non-believers...."

== Music ==
Musically, this album is a continuation of the progressive metal, technical death metal, metalcore and death metal sound the band is known for.

== Release ==
On September 16, 2009, "Obfuscation" was streamed live on Victory's metal focused web platform, VictoryMetal.com. The Great Misdirect debuted at #36 on the Billboard 200. The deluxe edition of the album was released on October 26, it included a "making of" documentary about the album, a walk through of all the band members' gear, and a 5.1 surround sound mix of the album. The name of the record is derived from the last line of the song "Obfuscation".

On March 16, 2010 the album was released in a limited edition vinyl, limited to 200 copies as clear pink vinyl and 1,250 as clear orange.

== Legacy ==
The second song "Obfuscation" is featured as downloadable content in Rock Band 2 via the Rock Band Network. It is also featured in the game Saints Row 3 on the radio "Blood 106.66".

== Track listing ==
All lyrics are written by Tommy Giles Rogers Jr.; all music is composed by Between the Buried and Me.

No.	Title	Length
1.	"Mirrors"	3:38
2.	"Obfuscation"	9:15
3.	"Disease, Injury, Madness"	11:03
4.	"Fossil Genera - A Feed from Cloud Mountain"	12:11
5.	"Desert of Song"	5:34
6.	"Swim to the Moon"	17:54
Total length:		59:34

== Personnel ==
Credits for The Great Misdirect adapted from liner notes.

Between the Buried and Me

- Tommy Giles Rogers Jr. – vocals, keyboards
- Paul Waggoner – electric and acoustic guitar, classical guitar, lap steel guitar, additional vocals on "Desert of Song"
- Dan Briggs – bass, fretless bass
- Dustie Waring – electric guitar, slide guitar, acoustic guitar, guitar effects
- Blake Richardson – drums, percussion

Production

- Jamie King – production, engineering, mixing, mastering
- Justin Johnson – engineering
- Brandon Proff – layout, concept design
- Chuck Johnson – photography, vocals on "Swim to the Moon"
