= Pulse (Thomas Giles album) =

Studio album by Thomas Giles
- Released: February 1, 2011
- Recorded: The Basement Studios in Winston-Salem, North Carolina
- Genres: Alternative rock, experimental rock, electronic, acoustic
- Length: 44:29
- Label: Metal Blade
- Producers: Thomas Giles, Jamie King

Pulse is the debut studio album by the American solo artist Thomas Giles — the pseudonym for vocalist and keyboardist Tommy Giles Rogers Jr. of the progressive metal band Between the Buried and Me. The album was released on February 1, 2011 through Metal Blade Records. Tommy Rogers previously released the album Giles under the name Giles in 2005 through Victory Records.

A music video for the opening track "Sleep Shake" was released on January 26, 2011.

Professional ratings
Review scores
Source	Rating
About.com	4/5 stars
Metal Injection	3/5 stars
Punknews	4/5 stars
Sputnik Music	3/5 stars
The Music	4/5 stars

== Track listing ==
All tracks are written by Tommy Giles Rogers Jr., except where noted.

No.	Title	Writer(s)	Length
1.	"Sleep Shake"		4:55
2.	"Reverb Island"		3:55
3.	"Mr. Bird"		4:24
4.	"Catch & Release"		3:25
5.	"Hamilton Anxiety Scale"	Rogers, Jake Troth	4:09
6.	"Scared"		2:35
7.	"Reject Falicon"		4:21
8.	"Medic"		2:48
9.	"Suspend the Death Watch"		5:14
10.	"Armchair Travel"		3:38
11.	"Hypoxia"		5:06
Total length:			44:29

== Personnel ==
- Thomas Giles - all instruments, production
- Jamie King - production
