= The Parallax II: Future Sequence =

Studio album by Between the Buried and Me
- Released: October 9, 2012
- Recorded: The Basement Studios in Winston-Salem, North Carolina
- Genres: Progressive metal; technical death metal; progressive death metal
- Length: 72:33
- Label: Metal Blade
- Producer: Jamie King

Between the Buried and Me chronology
The Parallax: Hypersleep Dialogues (2011)	The Parallax II: Future Sequence (2012)	Coma Ecliptic (2015)

The Parallax II: Future Sequence is the sixth studio album by the American progressive metal band Between the Buried and Me, released on October 9, 2012. The album's concept is the continuation of the band's 2011 EP The Parallax: Hypersleep Dialogues. Paul Waggoner and Dustie Waring (guitars) described it as being their favorite release up to now, being mature, dynamic, and with various metal influences from 1970s progressive rock, to jazz and fusion.

== Concept and story line ==
The Parallax II: Future Sequence starts with the end of the story ("Goodbye to Everything") where the two prospects wait for their planet to fly into the sun and burn. Following the opening song, the album picks up right where the 2011 EP, The Parallax: Hypersleep Dialogues, ended. Prospect 2 (on a spaceship in the middle of space) finds that his home on the old planet has disappeared so he starts to think about who he is in a dream and he finds that he does not understand his purpose ("Astral Body"). Prospect 2 then decides to either end his own life on the ship, or go back to the new planet where he planted human souls for government. He decides to go back to the new planet and on the way there he feels remorse as he wishes he could have gone back and told his wife that he was leaving to go to the new planet ("Lay Your Ghosts To Rest"). The next song, "Autumn" is described as a way to set up the atmosphere for the rest of the story.

Prospect 1 returns to his home from being adrift at sea ("Swim to the Moon", The Great Misdirect) to find everything gone and not what he remembers of home. He then begins to have these dreams that show him meeting someone with identical looks but a different agenda and when he wakes from these dreams one day, he finds that a city is being built around him. He buries his head in the dirt because of how loud the construction is. Then someone pulls his head from the dirt. This person happens to be the same person he dreamed about, himself, or known as Prospect 2 to the listener ("Extremophile Elite"). Then there is a flash back in the second half of Extremophile Elite that details Prospect 2's landing on the new planet. Once he lands on the planet, he stumbles his way to what seems like machines building a city in the distance and this is when he finds Prospect 1's head in the ground, but he thought it was just a dead man. So he pulls his head out of the ground to find the note that he left for his wife on the old planet under the mans skull. But finding the note turns out to be a dream.

Now that the prospects have met each other, they recollect over their losses and pains and know that they must decide what to do with the new planet ("Parallax"). The story then cuts to the beginning of time and introduces "The Night Owls", the creator of all ("The Black Box"). Prospect 2 becomes determined to destroy the Earth and so he tries to persuade Prospect 1 to join him and he agrees only because of his fear of Prospect 2. However, Prospect 1 internally decides to start a new life and live with his new love interest, who is never introduced in the album. Then another flashback takes place, Prospect 2's wife talks about how he has hurt her and left no note as to where he is. She then ends her own life by burning down their house ("Telos").

The album then travels to between The Great Misdirect and The Parallax: Hypersleep Dialogues. Prospect 1 drowns. He sinks to the bottom of the ocean and is revived by a village of sea creatures. The creatures analyze him to understand humans while he is hypnotized through their music. He is then sent back to the surface and The Parallax: Hypersleep Dialogues starts ("Bloom").

A new character known as "The Black Mask" was hired by the government to prevent the note that was left for Prospect 2's wife from being read on the old planet. The Black Mask never puts thought and feelings into his work. However, he kept the note and starts reading it years after. Eventually, the note gets to him and he tries to give the note to Prospect 2's wife only to find the house burned to the ground with the woman inside ("Melting City").

Now that Prospect 2 knows to destroy humanity and he discovers that The Night Owls and Prospect 1 have betrayed him. On the ship there is a box with instructions in it to use a gravity tractor to tow large asteroids. He will tow a large asteroid between the Earth and Sun to pull the Earth into the sun. Before he puts the plan into action, he finds Prospect 1 (who had vanished to live his "normal" life) and gasses his house to kidnap him. Then the Night Owls leave the Prospects' life, departing for an unknown journey. Prospect 1 wakes on the ship and accepts his death and the death of humanity ("Silent Flight Parliament").

== Reception ==
Professional ratings
Aggregate scores
Source	Rating
Metacritic	74/100
Review scores
Source	Rating
About.com	4/5 stars
AbsolutePunk	92%
AllMusic	4/5 stars
Blabbermouth.net	10/10
Blistering	9.5/10
Decibel	8/10 stars
Loudwire	5/5 stars
Popmatters	5/10
Revolver	3/5 stars

The album has received generally favourable reviews, with a Metacritic score of 74. About.com praised the band for balancing the immediacy of "Astral Body" with the longer songs described as "mini-symphonies". Several critics credited the band's songwriting for incorporating Between the Buried and Me's stylistic diversity into a cohesive form more attentive to developing core themes. However, the album was criticized by Brice Ezell of PopMatters as "the work of a band comfortable in its own ambition. It's all too easy to be impressed, and that's the exact kind of complacency one wouldn't expect from these guys". Writing for Revolver, Paige Camisasca similarly criticized the band's heavier material for sounding like "a less-than-inspired rehash of the group's previous work".

== Track listing ==
All lyrics are written by Tommy Giles Rogers Jr.; all music is composed by Between the Buried and Me.

No.	Title	Length
1.	"Goodbye to Everything"	1:39
2.	"Astral Body"	5:01
3.	"Lay Your Ghosts to Rest"	10:02
4.	"Autumn" (instrumental)	1:17
5.	"Extremophile Elite"	9:58
6.	"Parallax"	1:15
7.	"The Black Box"	2:10
8.	"Telos"	9:45
9.	"Bloom"	3:29
10.	"Melting City"	10:19
11.	"Silent Flight Parliament"	15:09
12.	"Goodbye to Everything Reprise"	2:29
Total length:		72:33

== Personnel ==
=== Between the Buried and Me ===
- Dan Briggs – bass, additional keyboards
- Blake Richardson – drums, percussion
- Tommy Giles Rogers Jr. – vocals, keyboards
- Paul Waggoner – lead guitar
- Dustie Waring – rhythm guitar

=== Guest musicians ===
- Amos Williams (of Tesseract) – spoken word on 'Parallax'
- Walter Fancourt (of Trioscapes) – bass clarinet, flute, tenor saxophone
- Ricky Alexander – violin
- Julian Hinshaw – tuba
- Maddox Giles (Vocalist Tommy Giles Rogers' infant son) – alien noises

=== Production ===
- Produced by Between the Buried and Me and Jamie King
- Engineered, mixed and mastered by Jamie King
- Additional production editing by Kevin King
- Art and Design by Chandler Owen

== Charts ==
Chart	Peak position	Weeks on chart
Billboard 200	22	2
U.S. Indie	5	2
U.S. Rock	7	2
U.S. Hard Rock	3	4
