= The Anatomy Of =

Studio album of cover songs by Between the Buried and Me
- Released: June 13, 2006
- Studio: The Basement Studios, Rural Hall, North Carolina
- Length: 69:56
- Label: Victory
- Producer: Jamie King

Between the Buried and Me chronology
Alaska (2005)	The Anatomy Of (2006)	Colors (2007)

Professional ratings
Review scores
Source	Rating
Allmusic	link
Lambgoat	link

The Anatomy Of is a cover album by the American progressive metal band Between the Buried and Me. It is the second release to include Dan Briggs, Blake Richardson, and Dustie Waring and consists entirely of cover songs by Between the Buried and Me's favorite bands and musical inspirations.

The band stays close to the original style of each song, resulting in an album of widely varying genres.

== Track listing ==
No.	Title	Writer(s)	Original artist (date)	Length
1.	"Blackened"	James Hetfield, Jason Newsted, Lars Ulrich	Metallica (1988)	6:40
2.	"Kickstart My Heart"	Nikki Sixx	Mötley Crüe (1989)	4:55
3.	"The Day I Tried to Live"	Chris Cornell	Soundgarden (1994)	5:28
4.	"Bicycle Race"	Freddie Mercury	Queen (1978)	3:09
5.	"Three of a Perfect Pair"	Adrian Belew, Bill Bruford, Robert Fripp, Tony Levin	King Crimson (1984)	4:11
6.	"Us and Them"	Richard Wright, Roger Waters	Pink Floyd (1973)	7:52
7.	"Geek U.S.A."	Billy Corgan	The Smashing Pumpkins (1993)	5:25
8.	"Forced March"	Karl Buechner	Earth Crisis (1995)	3:52
9.	"Territory"	Igor Cavalera, Max Cavalera, Andreas Kisser, Paulo Jr.	Sepultura (1993)	4:50
10.	"Change"	Shannon Hoon	Blind Melon (1992)	4:07
11.	"Malpractice"	Mike Patton	Faith No More (1992)	4:02
12.	"Little 15"	Martin L. Gore	Depeche Mode (1987)	4:31
13.	"Cemetery Gates"	Phil Anselmo, Darrell Abbott, Rex Brown, Vinnie Paul Abbott	Pantera (1990)	7:05
14.	"Colorblind"	Adam Duritz, Charlie Gillingham	Counting Crows (1999)	3:47
Total length:				69:56

== Chart positions ==
Year	Chart	Peak
2006	Top Heatseekers	2
2006	Independent Albums	9
2006	Billboard 200	151

== Personnel ==
Between the Buried and Me

- Tommy Giles Rogers – vocals, keyboards
- Paul Waggoner – guitars, vocals on track 10
- Dan Briggs – bass
- Dustie Waring – guitars
- Blake Richardson – drums

Production and art

- Jamie King – production, mixing, mastering
- Paul Friemel – art direction, layout, illustration
