= The Further Side =

Studio album by Nova Collective
- Released: 10 March 2017
- Recorded: 2014–2016
- Genres: Progressive metal, progressive rock, jazz fusion
- Length: 47:52
- Label: Metal Blade

Singles from The Further Side
- 1. "Dancing Machines" Released: 31 January 2015

The Further Side is the debut and, as of 2026, only studio album by Anglo-American progressive metal supergroup Nova Collective, released on 10 March 2017 via Metal Blade. It was promoted by the single "Dancing Machines", released earlier on 31 January.

Nova Collective was formed in 2014 by British guitarist Richard Henshall (Haken, To-Mera) and American bassist Dan Briggs (Between the Buried and Me). After exchanging demos and performing jams, they were joined by American drummer Matt Lynch (Cynic, Trioscapes) and British keyboardist Pete Jones (then ex-Haken). The group announced in December of that year that they were working on their debut album, then scheduled for a 3 March 2017 release.

The group is self-defined as a blend of jazz fusion and progressive rock; critics also see elements of both genres and progressive metal in their sound, with some pointing out touches of Latin jazz, samba and world music.

== Critical reception ==
Professional ratings
Review scores
Source	Rating
Metal.de	9/10
Prog	0/5 stars
Sea of Tranquility	5/5 stars
Classic Rock	4/5 stars
Metal Injection	9/10

The album was acclaimed by the critics. Writing for Prog, Chris Cope said the band's debut "shoots far beyond their day job groups, yet it still subtly and smartly snatches snippets from their vibrantly colourful palettes" and concluded his review by saying that it "is at times darkly demonic but utterly uplifting, challenging but cohesive, zany but zoned in. But it's also almost certainly one of the most exciting prog releases of the last few years."

His Future plc peer Jo Kendall, at Classic Rock, wrote that Henshall and Briggs "take no prisoners" on the album, which she called "a jazz-fusion thrill ride [...]. Crisp production, sublime musicality and the odd curveball [...] posit a jaw-dropping new unit."

Writing for Metal.de, Michael said that the album "combines American spontaneity with the uncompromising nature of classic British (jazz) prog" and called it an effort "whose enormous technical finesse never becomes an end in itself, but always serves the song." He praised the album's production, commenting that "every single instrument is superbly detailed and given just enough space so as not to overshadow the rest. As a result, 'The Further Side' sounds crisp and dynamic, making it easy to imagine NOVA COLLECTIVE rocking out live." He concluded by saying that "this supergroup has certainly earned its 'super' status and delivered a truly impressive debut. [...] The result is a diverse musical adventure that is surprisingly much more enjoyable than one would expect."

On Metal Injection, Greg Kennelty opened his review claiming that Nova Collective "penned a debut album which masterfully sums up modern progressive rock and metal into six succinct songs". He commented that the power of the album "lies in the reappearances of overarching themes throughout each song, and the differences between each composition" and concluded by saying that "The Further Side is a great album. It retains the controlled spastic madness of Between The Buried And Me, the eternally strange and semi-ethnic musings of Haken, and the always bombastic and jazz-heavy punches thrown by Trioscapes, yet adds a thematic and very fusion-influenced element into the mix that can only be classified now as Nova Collective."

Writing for Echoes and Dust, Liam Savage considered the album "a modern take on the classic jazz fusion and prog heavyweights of the 1970's". He weighted that the bass sound "isn't put front and centre in any capacity on this album" while "all the other members get time to showcase their respective instruments" and concluded by saying that "it would be impossible to think that with the history and talent of all the band members that this project wouldn't equate to anything but pure genius, and that's just what we receive."

In a 5-star review for Sea of Tranquility, the site's manager Pete Pardo described the sound as "highly intricate, yet melodic fusion, the songs adventurous yet engaging and accessible" and concluded that "the sheer magnitude of just how good The Further Side actually is took me a little by surprise. This could very well be the instrumental prog/fusion release of 2017 folks...it's that damn good."

The album was elected as one of the best prog albums of 2017 by the Prog Report and was named "Instrumental Album of the Year" by Sonic Perspectives.

== Track listing ==
The Further Side track listing
No.	Title	Length
1.	"Dancing Machines"	09:46
2.	"Cascades"	06:54
3.	"Air"	06:51
4.	"State of Flux"	09:40
5.	"Ripped Apart and Reassembled"	05:42
6.	"The Further Side"	08:59
Total length:		47:52

== Personnel ==
- Richard Henshall — guitars
- Dan Briggs — bass
- Pete Jones — keyboards
- Matt Lynch — drums
- Jamie King — engineering
- Rich Mouser — mixing
