= Dustie Waring =

American guitarist

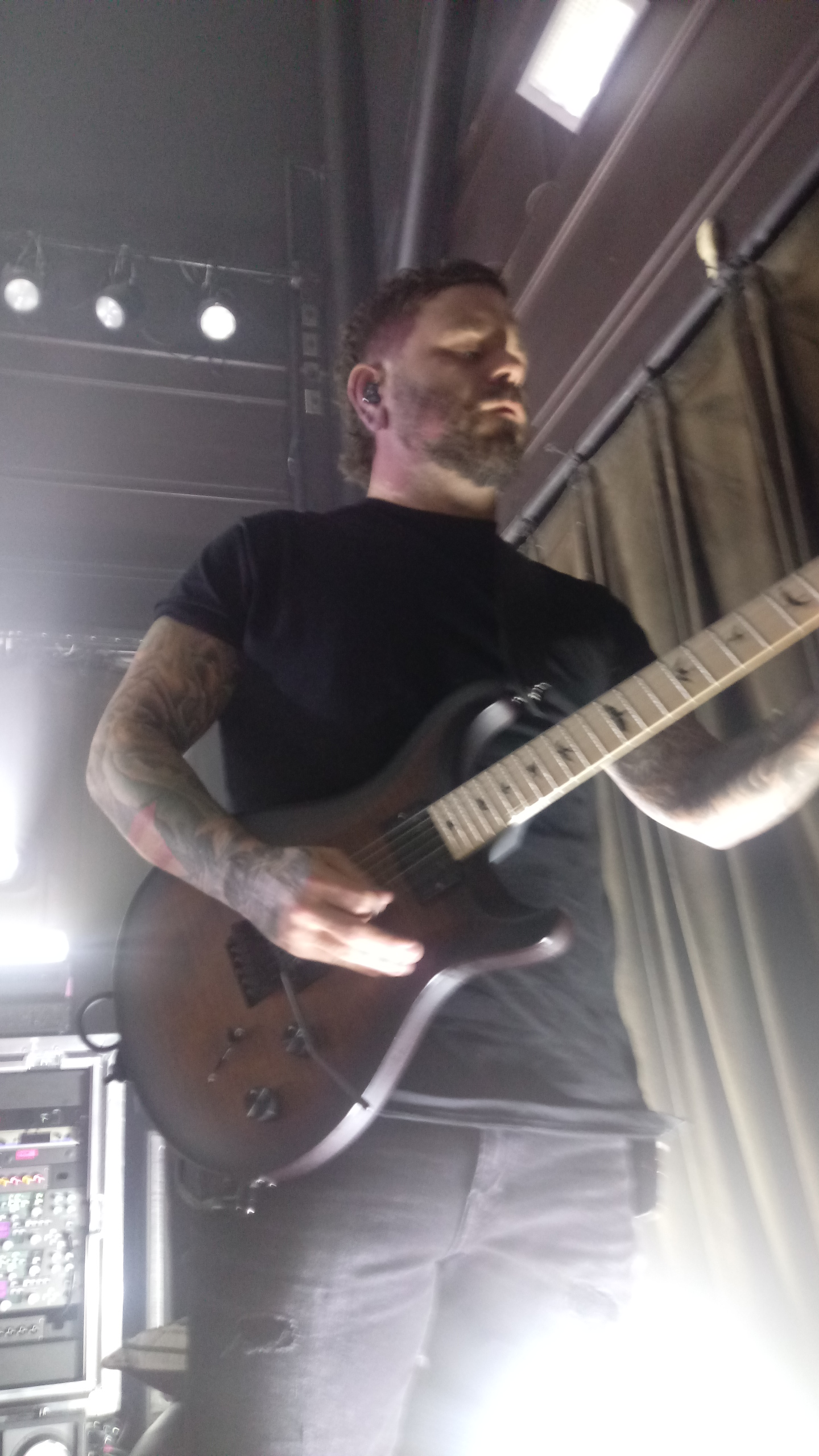
- Waring performing with Between the Buried and Me in 2021

Background information
- Born: Robert Dustie Waring; January 31, 1985 (age 41); Clemmons, North Carolina, U.S.
- Genres: Progressive metal, metalcore, deathcore
- Occupation: Guitarist
- Member of: Glass Casket
- Formerly of: Between the Buried and Me

Robert Dustie Waring (born January 31, 1985) is an American guitarist. He is known as the former guitarist for the progressive metal band Between the Buried and Me. He is also a guitarist for the deathcore band Glass Casket. Waring joined Between the Buried and Me along with Glass Casket bandmate Blake Richardson, replacing Shane Blay as rhythm guitarist.

== Career ==
Waring first started playing guitar after being inspired by guitarists like Randy Rhoads and felt further inspired by Pantera as well as his father and uncle. By the time he was fifteen, he had already started playing shows. In 2001, Gadrel, later renamed to Glass Casket, formed with Waring in Winston-Salem and would release their debut album, We Are Gathered Here Today, in 2004 that was produced by Jamie King, who previously produced albums like Between the Buried and Me, and would continue to produce future release by Between the Buried and Me.

In 2005, following the departure of Shane Blay, Waring would join Between the Buried and Me as they began work on their next album following The Silent Circus. The album, titled Alaska, would be the first album to feature Waring, along with Dan Briggs and Blake Richardson who had formed Glass Casket along with Waring.

In 2006, the band would release another album titled The Anatomy Of, where the album included various covers of songs from bands like Pantera and Metallica. Also in 2006, Glass Casket would release their next album, A Desperate Man's Diaries. After relentless touring, the band would be invited to Ozzfest 2006. Ozzfest pushed the band to want to further move into a unique direction that would set them apart from bands they would be commonly grouped with. The album that would come out of this was Colors, released in 2007. The album would give the band a push further into a progressive metal sound as well as grow each band member individually, including Waring's playing.

Following the release of A Desperate Man's Diaries, Glass Casket went inactive as individual members focused on other projects. Waring would continue to find success with Between the Buried and Me with the years following. Glass Casket remained inactive until Waring stated on Between the Buried and Me's message board that a new album was being planned for 2013. In 2023, it was announced that the band had signed to Silent Pendulum Records and would release a new album and reissue their previous two albums on vinyl. In June, the band released a self-titled EP. Waring is currently living in Nashville, Tennessee.

== Guitars ==
Waring plays on PRS Guitars and has a signature model of his own. He is known for heavily supporting PRS and in 2014 his signature model was first released and today he plays the DW CE 24 "Floyd" based on a core model.

== Allegation ==
On April 29, 2023, an anonymous person posted on the r/BetweenTheBuriedAndMe subreddit a set of screenshots from Instagram messages showing exchanges between her and Waring that accuse him of raping and impregnating her after a show. Shortly after, Between the Buried and Me would announce that Waring would sit out on their upcoming tour celebrating ten years of The Parallax II: Future Sequence where his position would be filled by Tristan Auman. Along with the announcement that Waring would sit out on the tour, Waring and his lawyer would also deny the allegations suggesting there was more to the story, citing text message evidence indicating this (and multiple subsequent incidences of sex between the two, where the accuser traveled multiple hours to see him) were consensual, and that the accuser had sent him numerous explicit messages and photos in the time following.

Waring would play at a festival in September 2023 along with the band following the allegations, but would be once again dropped from their following Colors Experience tour, having his position filled by Tristan Auman again. Waring would post to Instagram a letter to the band's corporate lawyer on April 8, 2024, stating that the band had previously asked him to leave the band during a meeting in North Carolina on January 4, 2024. The letter stated that the reasoning was not tied to the previous allegations, as according to the lawyer, they had been proven false, and instead the allegations are suggested to be part of an extortion plot against Waring. The letter states that the reasoning, suggesting Waring's performance on stage was unsatisfactory, as well as his behavior regarding the band, family of the band, and the band's on-tour crew, was not worthy reasoning to remove Waring from the band. Waring's lawyer is currently threatening to sue the band, and individually threatening to name Tommy Giles Rogers Jr. and Paul Waggoner as defendants, following his removal from the past two tours. The lawyer also stated that the band wished for his removal so they can receive a higher salary.

== Honors and awards ==
- Nominated for a GRAMMY Award, Best Metal Performance Condemned To The Gallows
