= The Parallax: Hypersleep Dialogues =

EP by Between the Buried and Me
- Released: April 12, 2011
- Recorded: December 13–23, 2010
- Studio: Metalworks Studios in Mississauga, Ontario, and Rattlebox Studios in Toronto, Ontario
- Genre: Progressive metal, technical death metal, avant-garde metal
- Length: 30:02
- Label: Metal Blade
- Producer: David Bottrill; Between the Buried and Me

Between the Buried and Me chronology
Best Of (2011)	The Parallax: Hypersleep Dialogues (2011)	The Parallax II: Future Sequence (2012)

The Parallax: Hypersleep Dialogues is an extended play by the American progressive metal band Between the Buried and Me. It was released on April 12, 2011, and was the group's first release through Metal Blade Records after leaving Victory Records in 2010. The entire EP was made available for streaming two weeks before its release on March 31, 2011.

The Parallax: Hypersleep Dialogues is the first release in a two-part concept album suite. The second half, The Parallax II: Future Sequence is a full-length album that was released on October 9, 2012. Between the Buried and Me made the conscious decision to precede a studio album with an extended play for several reasons, particularly to release a first album on Metal Blade fairly quickly. In addition to being part of a concept album series, frontman Tommy Giles Rogers also listed wanting to keep the group's name "out there" and seeking new material to perform at concerts in an interview with MetalSucks.

In support of the release, Between the Buried and Me toured North America with Job for a Cowboy, The Ocean and Cephalic Carnage during April through May 2011. During this tour, the group performed the entire EP, along with several tracks from previous albums, live at all concert dates.

== Concept and story line ==
The Parallax: Hypersleep Dialogues is written from the perspective of the characters Prospect 1 and Prospect 2. Prospect 1 is a seemingly normal citizen, whereas Prospect 2 is a space pilot tasked with planting human souls on a new planet.

The first track, "Specular Reflection", opens with Prospect 1 after the events of "Swim to the Moon" (The Great Misdirect). Prospect 1 wakes up on an island after attempting suicide by drowning. While on the island, he begins having dreams about seeing someone that looks exactly like him. Meanwhile, Prospect 2 begins having dreams about being on an island while flying towards the new planet.

In the second track, "Augment of Rebirth", Prospect 2 begins to develop a god complex as he arrives at the new planet and fulfills his mission. At the same time, Prospect 1 signals a passing boat to take him back to civilization.

In the final track, "Lunar Wilderness", Prospect 1 returns home only to find it has somehow vanished without a trace. Prospect 2 flies back to his home planet, discovering it has also disappeared.

== Reception ==
=== Critical reception ===
Professional ratings
Aggregate scores
Source	Rating
Metacritic	77/100
Review scores
Source	Rating
Allmusic	3.5/5 stars
Daily Dischord	9/10
Decibel	7/10
PopMatters	6/10
Revolver	4/5 stars
Rock Sound	8/10
Audiopinions	10/10

The Parallax: Hypersleep Dialogues received generally favorable reviews. Jason Lymangrover of Allmusic praised David Bottrill's production stating that it "is perfectly suited, and only enhances the band's ever-intensifying talents," and that the EP itself is "a short one, but even with a 30-minute running time, the EP cobbles together enough intricate twists and turns that it feels massive, and each of the three songs is an epic journey in precision." Adrien Begrand of PopMatters noted that, "there's nothing at all new [that Between the Buried and Me is] doing here, but what matters most is just how fresh they can make this new material sound, predictable as it all may feel."

Jeff Treppel of Decibel said that the concept of the EP was difficult to follow, commenting that "if they want you to care about what's going on, they fail."

=== Charts and sales ===
In its first week of release, The Parallax: Hypersleep Dialogues sold around 10,000 units and debuted on the US Billboard 200 chart at number 54. On other Billboard charts, the album ranked at number 16 on Rock Albums, number 8 on Independent Albums, number 5 on Hard Rock Albums and number 13 on Tastemaker albums.

== Track listing ==
All lyrics are written by Tommy Rogers; all music is composed by Between the Buried and Me.

No.	Title	Length
1.	"Specular Reflection"	11:21
2.	"Augment of Rebirth"	10:19
3.	"Lunar Wilderness"	8:22
Total length:		30:02

== Personnel ==
The Parallax: Hypersleep Dialogues as adapted from the CD liner notes.

Between the Buried and Me

- Dan Briggs – bass guitar
- Blake Richardson – drums, percussion
- Tommy Giles Rogers – vocals, keyboards
- Paul Waggoner – guitars
- Dustie Waring – guitars

Production

- David Bottrill – engineering, production
- Mat Klucznyk – assistant engineer
- Jamie King – mixing, mastering, additional production
- Between the Buried and Me – production
- Sons of Nero – artwork, layout

== Charts ==
Chart performance for The Parallax: Hypersleep Dialogues
Chart (2011)	Peak position
Canadian Albums (Nielsen SoundScan)	64
UK Independent Albums (OCC)	43
UK Rock & Metal Albums (OCC)	29
US Billboard 200	54
US Independent Albums (Billboard)	8
US Top Hard Rock Albums (Billboard)	5
US Top Rock Albums (Billboard)	16
US Top Tastemaker Albums (Billboard)	13
