= Obfuscation (disambiguation) =

Obfuscation is obscuring the intended meaning of communication by making it difficult to understand.

Obfuscation may also refer to:

- Obfuscation (software), creating code that is intentionally difficult for humans or computers to understand
- "Obfuscation", a song by Between the Buried and Me from the 2009 album The Great Misdirect
- Obfusc/ation, a volume of The Early Years 1965–1972 by Pink Floyd
