= The Silent Circus =

Studio album by Between the Buried and Me
- Released: October 21, 2003; October 3, 2006 (reissue)
- Recorded: 2003
- Genres: Metalcore; progressive metal; technical death metal
- Length: 52:56
- Label: Victory
- Producers: Matthew Ellard; Between the Buried and Me

Between the Buried and Me chronology
Between the Buried and Me (2002)	The Silent Circus (2003)	Alaska (2005)

Re-issue cover
- Cover for the reissue of The Silent Circus

Professional ratings
Review scores
Source	Rating
AllMusic	3/5 stars
PopMatters	8/10
Punknews	5/5 stars

The Silent Circus is the second studio album by the American progressive metal band Between the Buried and Me. Released October 21, 2003, it was their first album to be released through Victory Records after their departure from Lifeforce Records. It was re-released in 2006 with a bonus DVD included. The album includes 10 tracks with a hidden song titled "The Man Land" hidden at the end of "The Need for Repetition". This is the band's last release with guitarist Nick Fletcher and bassist Jason King. It is also the band's only album with drummer Mark Castillo and the only album not produced by Jamie King. The album was remixed and remastered in 2020.

A music video was released for the song "Mordecai"; the video starts with the first nineteen seconds of "Reaction" before transitioning into "Mordecai".

The two part song "Lost Perfection" are the first songs in the Parallax story, which would further develop in "Prequel to the Sequel" from their album Colors and "Swim to the Moon" from their album The Great Misdirect. The Parallax story later became its own EP and album respectively, The Parallax: Hypersleep Dialogues and The Parallax II: Future Sequence.

Some journalists consider it to be among the greatest and most important metalcore releases of the genre's second wave.

== Reception and legacy ==
The album received generally positive reviews from professional critics. Adrien Begrand of PopMatters opined in a positive review for the album, "The Raleigh, North Carolina, band had sliced and diced its way through multiple extreme metal subgenres, bridging the "math metal" complexity of the Dillinger Escape Plan, the godly hardcore of Converge, the furious technical death metal of Nile, and the more melodic strains of mid-'90s Swedish death metal with astonishing dexterity." Kurt Morris of Allmusic commented, "One minute the band may be playing thrash metal and the next they're flowing into death growls and thick guitar riffs. They certainly show a mastery of the hardcore and metal styles that many bands their age can take a lot longer to understand. The metal take on things can seemingly change in a flash as lead singer Tommy Rogers fleshes out his vocals and utilizes the keyboards to create something that sounds more like it should be on a Smashing Pumpkins album".

In 2020, John Hill of Loudwire included The Silent Circus in his list of the "Top 25 Metalcore Albums of All Time." In 2021, the album was included on BrooklynVegan's list of "15 Seminal Albums From Metalcore's Second Wave (2000-2010)."

== Track listing ==
All lyrics are written by Tommy Rogers; all music is composed by Between the Buried and Me.

No.	Title	Length
1.	"Lost Perfection A) Coulrophobia"	4:13
2.	"B) Anablephobia"	3:01
3.	"Camilla Rhodes"	4:49
4.	"Mordecai"	5:48
5.	"Reaction"	2:01
6.	"(Shevanel Take 2)"	3:14
7.	"Ad a dglgmut"	7:38
8.	"Destructo Spin"	4:46
9.	"Aesthetic"	3:45
10.	"The Need for Repetition" (song ends at 6:16, a hidden track entitled "The Man Land" begins at 11:16.)	13:37
Total length:		52:56

Re-issue DVD
No.	Title	Length
1.	"Lost Perfection A) Coulrophobia" (live)	3:51
2.	"Lost Perfection B) Anablephobia" (live)	3:00
3.	"Destructo Spin" (live)	4:09
4.	"Roboturner" (live)
5.	"All Bodies" (live)
6.	"Mordecai" (live)
7.	"Alaska" (live)
8.	"Metal Injection Interview"
9.	"Mordecai" (music video)	6:07
10.	"Alaska" (music video)	3:58

== Personnel ==
Between the Buried and Me

- Tommy Giles Rogers – lead vocals, keyboards
- Paul Waggoner – lead guitar, rhythm guitar, backing vocals, vocals on "Shevanel Take 2"
- Nick Fletcher – rhythm guitar
- Jason King – bass guitar
- Mark Castillo – drums

Production

- Matthew Ellard – production, mixing, recording
- Between the Buried and Me – production
- Carl Platter – drum technician
