= Tama Iron Cobra =

Bass drum pedal line

Overview
- Type: Chain Drive, Strap Drive
- Production: 1992–present

Body and chassis
- Layout: standard footboard, longboard (speed cobra), single pedal, double pedal

Powertrain
- Propulsion: rolling glide, flexi-glide, powerglide

The Tama Iron Cobra is a bass drum pedal line made between 1992 and the present. They are a full-baseplate, double chain or Kevlar strap drive, professional quality bass drum pedal used by many leading drummers. The Iron Cobra comes in both single and double pedal configurations with 3 different drive choices and, recently, a longboard Speed Cobra option. Tama also produces an Iron Cobra Junior pedal for beginner to intermediate audiences. The pedal's initial popularity was due to its adjustability, but it has since become known for its durability over time.

== History ==
Tama Drums introduced the first Iron Cobra pedal prototype in 1992. This pedal had some of the eventual features of the production Iron Cobras but, with quickly machined, blocky parts, it looked quite a bit less refined than the eventual consumer version.

In 1993, the first-generation Iron Cobra went on the market. The pedals looked similar to previous Tama models, having the typical silver, squared off footboard of the Tama pedals of the 1980s. The main difference with the new Cobra was the added adjustability of many of the components. The pedal was offered in a slightly less adjustable standard version and a full-featured professional version. The pedal was mostly the native silver color of the metal, with a few black painted details.

In 1998, the second-generation Iron Cobra was released. This version had a more refined, curved footboard, updated branding and logo, and a black powder-coated finish. The bearings were upgraded and the hoop clamp was upgraded. All of the adjustment mechanisms were refined for the second generation, as the pedal had built its name on adjustability the past 5 years. It was during this time when the standard non-professional version became known as the Iron Cobra Junior. The Junior version had only a single chain drive, as opposed to the double chain of the full professional version.

In 2011, the third generation Iron Cobra came out with a new set of features. The pedal retained the black styling of the second generation with a few changes in features. This Cobra had a footboard surface that was smoother, the bearing housing was redesigned, the cam shapes were altered slightly, and the baseplate came with a feature called the Cobra Coil. The Cobra coil was a spring mounted beneath the footboard that was supposed to increase speed and responsiveness. Unlike the other upgrades, this Cobra Coil feature is unique to the Iron Cobra line and has come to be seen as a gimmick, rather than a true upgrade, adding very little to the playability of the pedals.

In 2013, the third-generation pedals were joined by two new variants, the duo-glide, which allowed the cam shape to be altered, and the Speed Cobra, a longboard version with a unique light sprocket cam, new fastball bearing type, and a different beater shape.

== Features ==
Since the beginning the Iron Cobra was known for adjustability. Through all the generations, the pedal has had the ability to adjust the footboard angle independently of the beater shaft angle, adjust the beater head angle, adjust the hoop clamp size, adjust the beater shaft length, adjust the feel of the beater with a sliding weight, and adjust the spring tension. Not all of these adjustments are universally possible on all other pedals from other manufacturers. The cam shape is not adjustable on the Iron Cobra, except on the third gen. duo-glide model, but the pedal has historically been offered with two different optional cams. The rolling-glide cam is round for a smooth action, while the power glide cam changes radius mid-stroke for more acceleration. While most of the Iron Cobra pedals are double chain drive, the flexi-glide version has a Kevlar strap drive. Since at least the second generation, the pedals have come with a hard plastic carrying case.

== Artists ==
Prominent drummers to use the pedal include Zach Hill, Dave Lombardo, Scott Travis, Joey Jordison, Mike Portnoy, Gavin Harrison, Stewart Copeland, Lars Ulrich, and Derrick Plourde.
