= Tommy Giles Rogers Jr. =

American singer and keyboardist

Tommy Giles Rogers
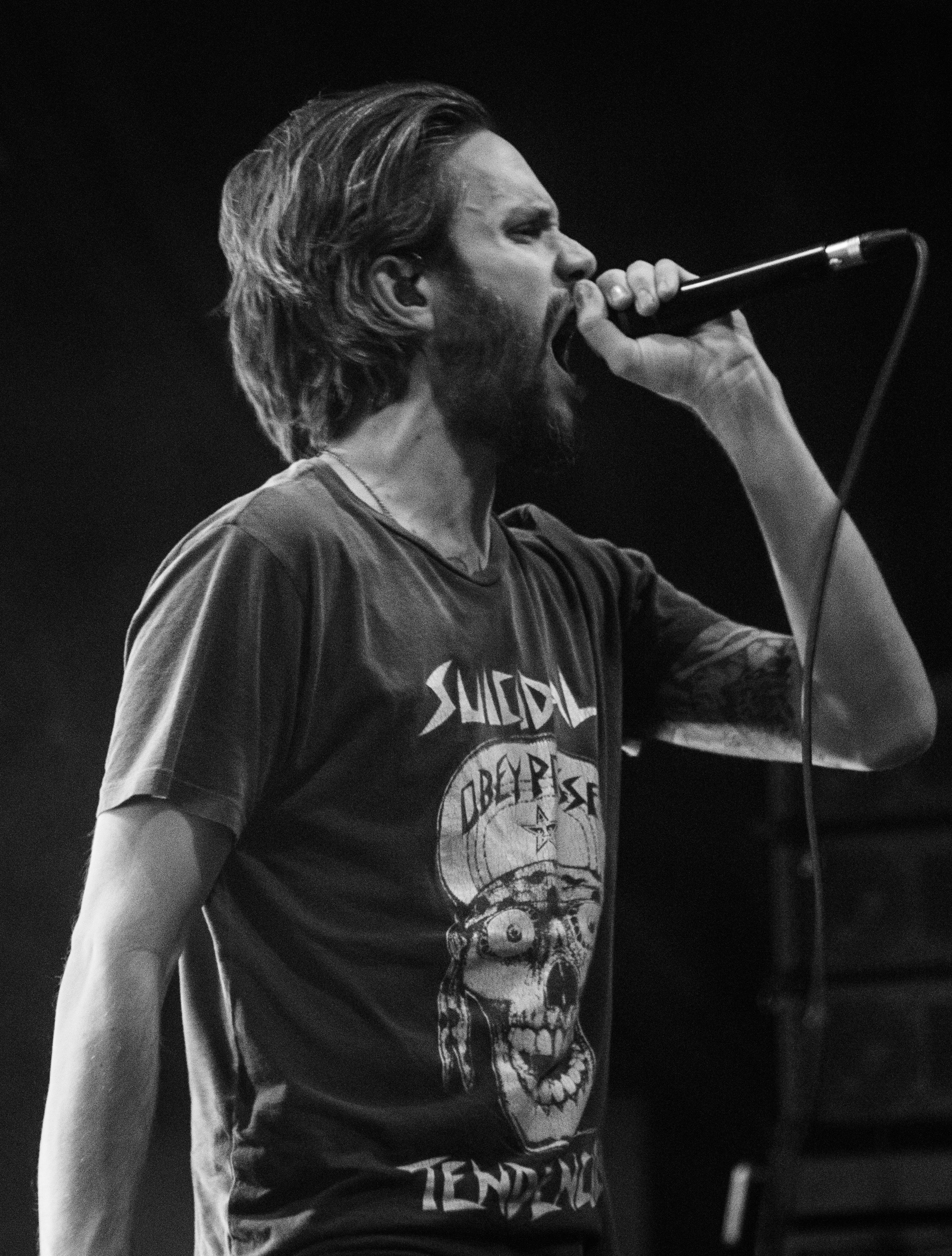
- Rogers in 2015

Background information
- Born: Thomas Giles Rogers Jr. December 30, 1980 (age 44); Morganton, North Carolina, U.S.
- Origin: Raleigh, North Carolina, U.S.
- Genres: Progressive metal; metalcore; technical death metal; progressive rock; industrial; electronica
- Occupations: Singer; musician; songwriter
- Instruments: Vocals; keyboards; guitar; drums
- Years active: 1999–present
- Member of: Between the Buried and Me; Thomas Giles
- Formerly of: Prayer for Cleansing; From Here On; Undying

Tommy Giles Rogers (born December 30, 1980) is an American musician, most notable for being the lead vocalist, keyboardist and lyricist of the progressive metal band Between the Buried and Me, which he co-founded in 2000. His vocal style combines death growls and screams with peaceful clean singing melodies, sometimes including falsetto. In 2005, Stylus Magazine named Rogers one of the three most versatile rock singers at the time.

== Career ==
Rogers grew up playing guitar but he sang for a hardcore punk band named Soul Integrity in high school. In 1999, he became the guitarist for the metalcore band Prayer for Cleansing; when they disbanded, Rogers co-founded the progressive metal band Between the Buried and Me in 2000. Although he intended to be their guitar player at first, the band could not find a vocalist which prompted him to take that role. After acquiring a full lineup, Between the Buried and Me released their three-song demo and then their self-titled debut album in 2002. In 2004, Rogers released a self-titled debut album for his electronica side project, named Giles. Rogers was one of the vocalists for the metal band From Here On and has appeared in numerous other musical projects, including the metal band Undying. He was part of a clothing line and a small musical duo project with Jacob Troth that is known as Jacob Rogers.

He has made numerous vocal guest appearances since the success of Between the Buried and Me, such as his featuring on the Devin Townsend Project album Deconstruction and the Ayreon album The Source, portraying The Chemist.

Rogers recorded a solo album under the name of Thomas Giles, entitled Pulse, which was released February 1, 2011. His other solo albums are Modern Noise, released November 25, 2014, Velcro Kid, released November 4, 2016, and Don't Touch the Outside, which was released on November 9, 2018, via Sumerian Records.

== Influences ==
Rogers' biggest influence is experimental singer Mike Patton, including his bands Mr. Bungle and Faith No More. Other artists that have greatly influenced him are Radiohead, Pink Floyd, The Mars Volta, Nine Inch Nails, and Muse. Since high school, one of his biggest inspirations has been electronic music; some of these artists include Adult, Funker Vogt, Air and Dieselboy. The singer has consistently named the Beatles among his favorite bands. Furthermore, Rogers draws techniques from directors and filmmakers of works like The Twilight Zone, The Hateful Eight and The Godfather series.

Rogers grew up a big fan of extreme metal, but only once he discovered metallic hardcore bands such as Earth Crisis he began to write music devotedly. After being in hardcore bands until his early 20s, Rogers realized that his tastes were much wider and decided to explore many musical avenues. He has a long-standing fascination with the Scandinavian black metal scene, admiring its experimentation around the turn of the millennium and bands like Ulver and Leprous.

In 2019, Rogers named Radiohead's OK Computer, any Beatles record and Mr. Bungle's California his three favorite albums.

== Personal life ==
Rogers currently resides in Laguna Niguel, California with his wife and son. He is vegan and straight edge.

== Discography ==
With Between the Buried and Me

- Between the Buried and Me – Lifeforce (2002)
- The Silent Circus – Victory (2003)
- Alaska – Victory (2005)
- The Anatomy Of – Victory (2006)
- Colors – Victory (2007)
- Colors Live – Victory (2008)
- The Great Misdirect – Victory (2009)
- The Parallax: Hypersleep Dialogues – Metal Blade (2011)
- The Parallax II: Future Sequence – Metal Blade (2012)
- Coma Ecliptic – Metal Blade (2015)
- Automata I – Sumerian Records (2018)
- Automata II – Sumerian Records (2018)
- Colors II – Sumerian Records (2021)
- The Blue Nowhere - Inside Out Music (2025)

With Jacob Rogers

- Jacob Rogers (2012)

As Giles

- Giles – Victory (2004)

As Thomas Giles

- Pulse – Metal Blade (2011)
- Modern Noise – Metal Blade (2014)
- Dutch Book (Original Score) – Self-Released (2015)
- Velcro Kid – Sumerian Records (2016)
- Don't Touch the Outside – Sumerian Records (2018)
- Feel Better (EP) – Wise and Silent (2020)
- Feel Nothing (EP) – Wise and Silent (2021)

With Prayer For Cleansing

- The Tragedy – Southern Empire (2004)

With From Here On

- Hope for a Bleeding Sky – Tribunal Records (1999, 2005)

As a guest

- August Burns Red – Constellations – featured vocals on "Indonesia" (2009)
- The Devin Townsend Project – Deconstruction – featured vocals on "Planet of The Apes" (2011)
- Intensus – Intensus – featured vocals on "Outlast Robinsum" and "I'm A Wisdom" (2011)
- Johnny Booth – Connections – featured vocals on "Ink and Sky" (2011)
- The Safety Fire – Mouth of Swords – featured vocals on "Beware The Leopard (Jagwar)" (2013)
- Abnormal Thought Patterns – Altered States of Consciousness – featured vocals on "Nocturnal Haven" (2015)
- Ayreon – The Source – character "The Chemist"; featured on "The Day That the World Breaks Down", "Sea of Machines", "Everybody Dies", "Star of Sirrah", "Condemned to Live", "Aquatic Race", "Bay of Dreams", "The Source Will Flow" and "The Human Compulsion" (2017)
- Charlie Griffiths – Tiktaalika – featured vocals on "Arctic Cemetery" and "Under Polaris" (2022)

== Honors and awards ==
- Nominated for a GRAMMY Award, Best Metal Performance Condemned To The Gallows
