= Between the Buried and Me (album) =

Studio album by Between the Buried and Me
- Released: April 30, 2002
- Recorded: December 2001 – January 2002
- Studio: The Basement Studios, Rural Hall, North Carolina
- Genre: Progressive metalcore; death metal; math rock
- Length: 48:26
- Label: Lifeforce
- Producer: Jamie King

Between the Buried and Me chronology
Between the Buried and Me (2002)	The Silent Circus (2003)

Professional ratings
Review scores
Source	Rating
AllMusic	4/5 stars
Mind Equals Blown	7.5/10
PopMatters	6/10

Between the Buried and Me is the debut studio album by the American progressive metal band Between the Buried and Me. It was produced by Jamie King and was released on April 30, 2002 through Lifeforce Records.

This is the band's only studio album with drummer and clean vocalist Will Goodyear. A music video was released for the song "Aspirations" and was directed by Ian Larson.

== Background ==
Between the Buried and Me formed in 2000 in Raleigh, North Carolina after the demise of metalcore bands From Here On and Prayer for Cleansing, which Rogers, Waggoner, and Goodyear had been members of. Guitarist Nick Fletcher and bassist Jason King would subsequently join the band.

In 2001, the band would record a demo featuring the songs "What We Have Become", "More of Myself to Kill" and "The Use of a Weapon"; these three songs would be re-recorded for Between the Buried and Me. After the demo's release, the band would be signed to Lifeforce Records.

== Release history ==
The album was re-released in 2004 by the band's then current label, Victory Records. This version was released as an enhanced CD featuring the music videos for "Aspirations" and "Mordecai". The release also came with a sampler CD featuring songs by other bands that were signed to Victory at the time.

A remixed and remastered version of the album was released in 2020 alongside remixed and remastered versions of The Silent Circus, Alaska, and Colors. The remixed and remastered version was released digitally and on vinyl through Craft Recordings.

== Lyrics ==
The songs on the album demonstrate numerous concepts—one of which, the song "Arsonist", was written about their strong feelings against the Westboro Baptist Church in Topeka, Kansas, which has become well known as a controversial religious organization and hate group. The song "Fire for a Dry Mouth" was written as a "fuck you" to a former friend of the band, according to PopMatters.

== Track listing ==
All lyrics are written by Tommy Rogers; all music is composed by Between the Buried and Me.

No.	Title	Length
1.	"More of Myself to Kill"	6:48
2.	"Arsonist"	4:50
3.	"Aspirations"	5:45
4.	"What We Have Become"	5:07
5.	"Fire for a Dry Mouth"	6:05
6.	"Naked by the Computer"	5:33
7.	"Use of a Weapon"	4:51
8.	"Shevanel Cut a Flip"	9:27
Total length:		48:26

Enhanced content music videos
No.	Title	Length
1.	"Aspirations"	6:04
2.	"Mordecai"	6:06

== Personnel ==
Between the Buried and Me

- Tommy Giles Rogers – lead vocals
- Paul Waggoner – lead guitar, rhythm guitar, backing vocals
- Nick Fletcher – rhythm guitar
- Jason King – bass guitar
- Will Goodyear – drums, clean vocals, layout, design

Production

- Jamie King – production, engineering, editing, mixing
- David Stith – layout, design
- Alan Douches – mastering
- Allison Mannerino – photography
