= Alaska (Between the Buried and Me album) =

Studio album by Between the Buried and Me
- Released: September 6, 2005
- Recorded: June 2005
- Studios: Basement Studios in Winston-Salem, North Carolina
- Genres: Progressive metal; technical death metal; progressive metalcore; mathcore
- Length: 53:50
- Label: Victory
- Producers: Matthew Ellard; Jamie King; Between the Buried and Me

Between the Buried and Me chronology
| The Silent Circus (2003) | Alaska (2005) | The Anatomy Of (2006) |

Professional ratings
Review scores
| Source | Rating |
|---|---|
| AllMusic | 4.5/5 stars |
| Blabbermouth.net | 8.5/10 |
| Lambgoat | 8/10 |
| Sputnikmusic | 5/5 stars |
| Stylus | A− |

Alaska is the third studio album by the American progressive metal band Between the Buried and Me. It was released on September 6, 2005 through Victory Records and is the first album to feature the band's longest lasting lineup, with the addition of Dustie Waring on guitar, Dan Briggs on bass, and Blake Richardson on drums. This lineup would remain until 2023 following Waring's dismissal from the band. The band co-produced the album with Matthew Ellard, who produced the band's last album The Silent Circus, and Jamie King, who had previously produced the band's self-titled album. The album was remixed and remastered in 2020.

While Alaska did not sell as well as its predecessor The Silent Circus upon release, it still achieved high critical reviews and it includes some of the band's most notable songs, such as its title track and "Selkies: The Endless Obsession". Another version of Alaska was released featuring instrumental versions of most its songs (excluding tracks 3, 6, and 7). A music video was released for the song "Alaska".

== Track listing ==
All lyrics are written by Tommy Rogers; all music is composed by Between the Buried and Me.

| No. | Title | Length |
|---|---|---|
| 1. | "All Bodies" | 6:12 |
| 2. | "Alaska" | 3:57 |
| 3. | "Croakies and Boatshoes" | 2:22 |
| 4. | "Selkies: The Endless Obsession" | 7:23 |
| 5. | "Breathe In, Breathe Out" (instrumental) | 0:55 |
| 6. | "Roboturner" | 7:07 |
| 7. | "Backwards Marathon" | 8:27 |
| 8. | "Medicine Wheel" (instrumental) | 4:18 |
| 9. | "The Primer" | 4:46 |
| 10. | "Autodidact" | 5:30 |
| 11. | "Laser Speed" (instrumental) | 2:53 |
| Total length: | | 53:50 |

== Personnel ==
=== Between the Buried and Me ===
- Tommy Giles Rogers – lead vocals, keyboards
- Paul Waggoner – lead guitar, vocals
- Dan Briggs – bass
- Dustie Waring – rhythm guitar
- Blake Richardson – drums, percussion

=== Production ===
- Produced by Matthew Ellard and Jamie King
- Engineered by Jamie King
- Mixed by Matthew Ellard
- Kris Smith – mix assistant
- Alan Douches – mastering
- Wes Richardson – artwork and layout
