= Colors (Between the Buried and Me album) =

Studio album by Between the Buried and Me
- Released: September 18, 2007
- Recorded: May 2007
- Studios: Basement Studios in Winston-Salem, North Carolina
- Genres: Progressive death metal; avant-garde metal; metalcore
- Length: 64:26
- Label: Victory
- Producers: Between the Buried and Me; Jamie King

Between the Buried and Me chronology
The Anatomy Of (2006)	Colors (2007)	Colors Live (2008)

Colors is the fourth studio album by the American progressive metal band Between the Buried and Me, released on September 18, 2007, through Victory Records. Although separated in 8 tracks, Colors gives the impression of one continuous song, with transitions between each part. The album was remixed and remastered in 2020. In August 2021, the band released a sequel to Colors, titled Colors II.

In 2024, John Hill of Loudwire named it the best metalcore album of 2007.

== Overview ==
Colors was recorded in April through May 2007 at the Basement Studios with Jamie King as the chosen producer for it. Prior to its release, it received great praise and sold 12,600 copies in its first week of release, reaching 57th on the Billboard 200, which was the first time the band reached the top 100 on the list. Mike Portnoy of Dream Theater, one of Between the Buried and Me's main influences, named Colors his favorite album of the year. PopMatters wrote, "A true marvel, this challenging but ultimately highly rewarding album is an example of a young band just discovering what it’s capable of. At the rate they’re going, the modern metal pantheon awaits," while Ultimate Guitar also named it "Best Album of the Year" in their annual This Year in Metal.

A live DVD, titled Colors Live, was released on October 14, 2008, and includes footage from a live show on August 2, 2008, at Rocketown in Nashville, Tennessee.

The song "Prequel to the Sequel" is featured as downloadable content for the video game, Rock Band 2, though it is the radio edited version of the song, shortened to five minutes, leaving the polka verse and everything after missing.

In May 2017, Between the Buried and Me announced a 10th anniversary tour of the album with The Contortionist, Polyphia, and Toothgrinder.

== Music ==
The band described the album as "adult contemporary progressive death metal".

Dave Donnelly of AllMusic described the music of Colors as being "an anomaly on the otherwise more conservative, pop-punk and hardcore oriented Victory Records label" noting that the group "play a progressive style of extreme metal" which incorporated a range of styles.

Loudwire commented about the song "Ants of the Sky": "The 13-minute track weaves in and out of demented carnival metal, psychedelic solos, smooth jazz guitar, space rock and a goddamn country hoedown… not to mention the most tear-jerkingly beautiful solo of Paul Waggoner’s career."

== Promotion ==
Two weeks before the release of Colors, the band released a series of videos for the songs. The videos consisted of clips from classic films, and each video was shown for one day before being removed. The videos were designated different colors to coincide with the album's theme, although having no known relation to the lyrics:

- "Foam Born (a) The Backtrack" and "(b) The Decade of Statues" – orange
- "Informal Gluttony" – green
- "Sun of Nothing" – yellow
- "Ants of the Sky" – red
- "Prequel to the Sequel" – aqua
- "Viridian" – blue
- "White Walls" – purple

== Reception ==
Professional ratings
Review scores
Source	Rating
About.com	4/5 stars
AllMusic	3/5 stars
Alternative Press	4.5/5 stars
Blabbermouth.net	9/10
Exclaim!	(highly favorable)
PopMatters	8/10
Punknews.org	4.5/5 stars
Rock Hard	7/10
Sputnikmusic	4/5 stars
Ultimate Guitar	(9.7/10)

In 2014, Prog put Colors at #45 on their "Top 100 Greatest Prog Albums Of All Time" list commenting that "Between The Buried And Me found their range and musical mobility here. Aside from metal, it has influences from jazz and pop. It’s an album that encompasses differing styles but has an irresistible dynamic." Loudwire placed the album at #7 on their "Top 100 Hard Rock and Heavy Metal Albums of the 21st Century" list, saying that it was "nothing less than a complete metamorphosis of progressive metal."

Kerrang named the album in their list "The 21 Best U.S. Metalcore Albums Of All Time." Loudwire named it at fifth in their list "Top 25 Progressive Metal Albums of All Time." ThoughtCo also named Colors in their list "Essential Progressive Metal Albums."

== Track listing ==
All lyrics are written by Tommy Rogers; all music is composed by Between the Buried and Me.

No.	Title	Length
1.	"Foam Born (A) The Backtrack"	2:14
2.	"(B) The Decade of Statues"	5:21
3.	"Informal Gluttony"	6:48
4.	"Sun of Nothing"	10:59
5.	"Ants of the Sky"	13:11
6.	"Prequel to the Sequel"	8:37
7.	"Viridian" (instrumental)	2:52
8.	"White Walls"	14:14
Total length:		64:26

== Personnel ==
Credits for Colors adapted from liner notes.

Between the Buried and Me

- Tommy Giles Rogers – vocals, keyboards
- Paul Waggoner – guitar
- Dan Briggs – bass
- Dustie Waring – guitar
- Blake Richardson – drums, percussion

Guest musicians

- Adam Fisher (Fear Before) – harsh and clean vocals on "Prequel to the Sequel"
- Graham Bennett – didgeridoo on "Informal Gluttony"

Production

- Jamie King – production, engineering, mixing, mastering
- Brandon Proff – layout
- Chuck Johnson – photography
