= Between the Buried and Me =

American progressive metal band

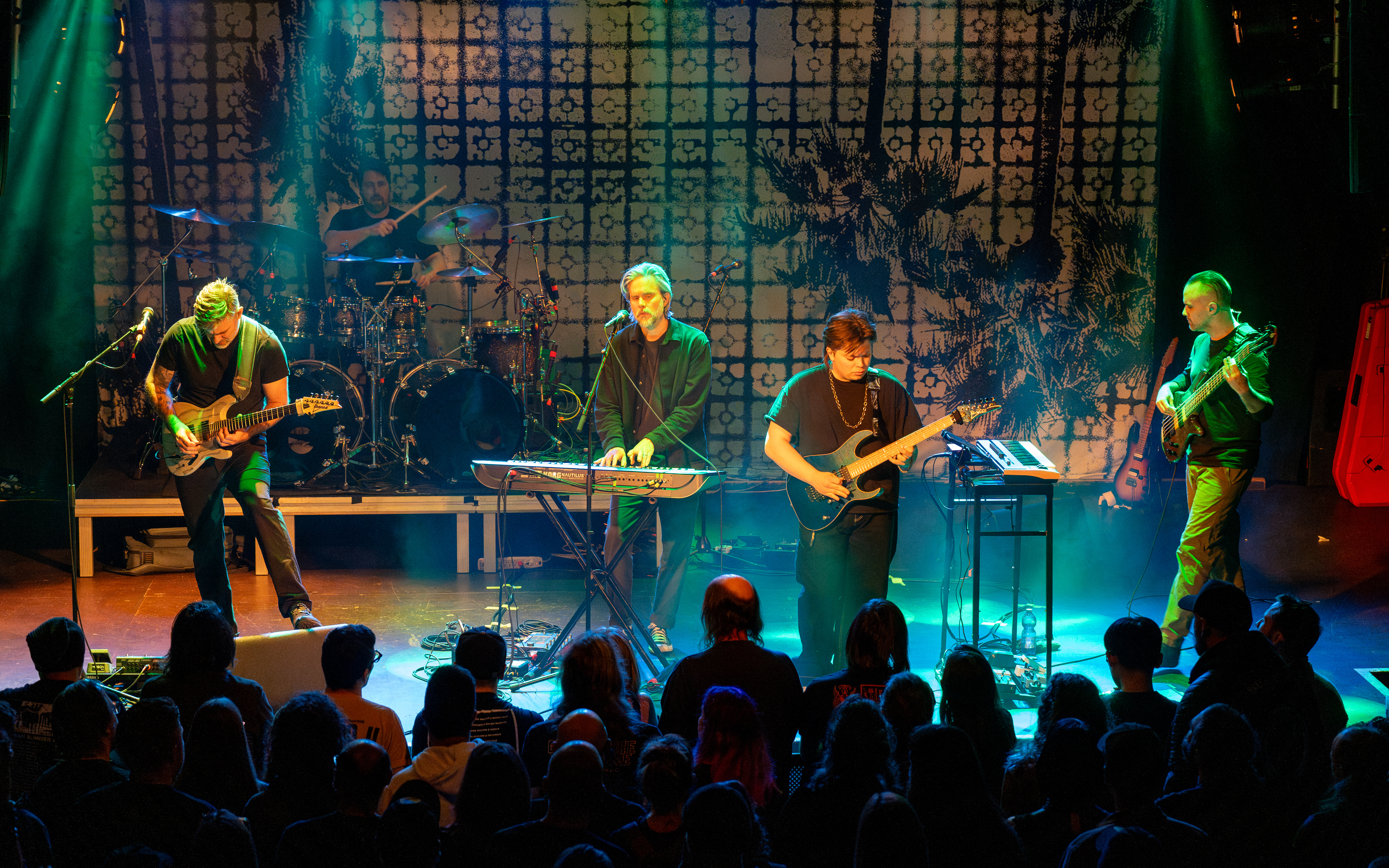
- Between the Buried and Me performing in March 2026. L–R: Paul Waggoner, Blake Richardson, Tommy Giles Rogers Jr., Tristan Auman, Dan Briggs

Background information
- Origin: Raleigh, North Carolina, U.S.
- Genres: Progressive metal; metalcore; technical death metal; avant-garde metal
- Years active: 2000–present
- Labels: Lifeforce; Victory; Metal Blade; Sumerian; Inside Out
- Spinoff of: Prayer for Cleansing
- Members: Tommy Giles Rogers; Paul Waggoner; Dan Briggs; Blake Richardson
- Past members: Will Goodyear; Nicholas Fletcher; Jason King; Mark Castillo; Kevin Falk; Shane Blay; Jason Roe; Dustie Waring
- Website: Official website

Between the Buried and Me, often abbreviated as BTBAM, is an American progressive metal band from Raleigh, North Carolina. Formed in 2000, the band consists of Tommy Giles Rogers Jr. (lead vocals, keyboards), Paul Waggoner (guitar, backing vocals), Dan Briggs (bass, keyboards), and Blake Richardson (drums).

Their debut eponymous album was released through Lifeforce Records in 2002, shifting to Victory Records for subsequent releases until their signing to Metal Blade in 2011, where Between the Buried and Me released their first extended play, The Parallax: Hypersleep Dialogues that year, and its full-length follow-up, The Parallax II: Future Sequence, the following year. Their seventh studio album, Coma Ecliptic, was released in July 2015, and their eighth and ninth albums, Automata I and II, were released in 2018. Their tenth album, Colors II (a follow-up to 2007's Colors), was released in August 2021, and their eleventh studio album, The Blue Nowhere, was released in September 2025.

== History ==
=== Formation and eponymous album (2000–2002) ===
The band was formed in 2000, in Raleigh, North Carolina after the demise of the metalcore bands From Here On and Prayer for Cleansing, of which Rogers, Waggoner, and Goodyear were members. Nick Fletcher and Jason King joined on guitar and bass, respectively. The name "Between the Buried and Me" was chosen after a section of lyrics in the Counting Crows song "Ghost Train".

Between the Buried and Me's first release was a demo containing three songs, all of which were re-recorded for the band's self-titled debut album, released through Lifeforce Records in 2002. The song "Aspirations" became the band's first music video. The album was not initially successful but caught the attention of Victory Records, to which they signed. Victory reissued the album in 2004 as an enhanced CD. The band toured in support of their first album with Canadian metalcore group The End.

=== The Silent Circus, Alaska, and The Anatomy Of (2003–2006) ===
In August 2003, Between the Buried and Me traveled to Q Division Studios in Somerville, Massachusetts to record their second record, The Silent Circus, released in October the same year. It was re-released in 2006 with a live DVD of the band's performance at The Cat's Cradle in Chapel Hill, North Carolina on July 17, 2005. Mark Castillo played drums on The Silent Circus, replacing Goodyear.

After the release of The Silent Circus, the band went through numerous members before the current lineup was assembled for their third album, Alaska. On drums, Mark Castillo was replaced with Jason Roe, and later with Blake Richardson. On guitar, Fletcher was replaced with Shane Blay, and later with Dustie Waring. And on bass, King was replaced with Kevin Falk, and later with Dan Briggs.

In September 2005, Between the Buried and Me released Alaska. The album released the songs "Selkies: The Endless Obsession", "The Primer", and "Backwards Marathon" as singles. In the following year, the band released their first cover album, The Anatomy Of, a collection of covers of bands that influenced them, including Metallica, King Crimson, Pantera, Faith No More, Queen, Pink Floyd, Earth Crisis, Counting Crows, and Soundgarden. In early 2006, Between the Buried and Me was on tour supporting Bleeding Through along with Every Time I Die and Haste the Day. They were also on the Ozzfest 2006 Second Stage, and they played as the main support band for DragonForce on their Ozzfest off-date headline tour. In late 2006, they were on the Radio Rebellion Tour headlined by Norma Jean.

=== Colors and The Great Misdirect (2007–2009) ===
In September 2007, Between the Buried and Me released their fourth studio album (fifth including The Anatomy Of), Colors. Band members called it "a 65 minute opus of non stop pummeling beautiful music... we have described this release as 'new wave polka grunge'." The band also described the album as "adult contemporary progressive death metal".

In September 2007, after the release of Colors, the band toured with Animosity and Horse the Band. Giant (now known as BraveYoung) also supported their shows in the US. The run concluded with their November 4 appearance at the Saints and Sinners Fest in Asbury Park, New Jersey. In December 2007, they embarked on a headlining tour, supported by August Burns Red and Behold... The Arctopus. The band were the main support on The Dillinger Escape Plan's 2008 UK tour. Between the Buried and Me were one of the acts that took part at "Progressive Nation '08", the first in what became an annual progressive music festival, also featuring Dream Theater, Opeth, and 3.

Starting in summer 2008 and continuing in the fall, they supported Children of Bodom's US headlining tour, alongside The Black Dahlia Murder. In early December 2008, they went on a short four-show tour around the Carolinas and Georgia (US) with other bands from the Carolinas, such as He Is Legend, Advent, and Nightbear. Between the Buried and Me finished a month-long tour of Australia on January 9 with headliners Bleeding Through, As Blood Runs Black, In Trenches, and The Abandonment. In September 2009, Between the Buried and Me performed a Canadian Tour with Killswitch Engage and In Flames co-headlining, along with the support of Protest the Hero.

On May 31, 2009, the group entered the studio to record their fifth album (sixth including The Anatomy Of), The Great Misdirect. They released the single "Obfuscation" on September 29 and the album on October 27.

=== The Parallax and Metal Blade Records (2010–2014) ===
In February 2010, Between the Buried and Me supported Mastodon along with Baroness on their US headlining tour. During the summer of 2010, they were on the Cool Tour with As I Lay Dying, Underoath, War of Ages, The Acacia Strain, Architects, Cancer Bats, and Blessthefall.

In early 2010, Between the Buried and Me toured across North America with Cynic, Devin Townsend, and Scale the Summit. Afterwards, they traveled to Europe supporting Lamb of God, along with Job for a Cowboy and August Burns Red.

In February 2011, Between the Buried and Me were confirmed to play at the New England Metal & Hardcore Festival on Saturday, April 16 in Worcester, MA. They were the main support for Hatebreed. In April and May 2011, they headlined a tour featuring Job for a Cowboy, The Ocean, and on select dates Cephalic Carnage.

Between the Buried and Me stated their move from Victory to Metal Blade Records and quickly released an EP entitled The Parallax: Hypersleep Dialogues on April 12, 2011. In May, Victory Records announced the release of a greatest hits album as a three-disc set. On January 16, 2012, Between the Buried and Me revealed that work on the full-length second part to The Parallax had begun and was later released as The Parallax II: Future Sequence on October 9, 2012.

Between the Buried and Me announced a headlining European tour beginning in Paris on September 2, 2011, and continuing throughout the mainland and into the UK, ending up in Moscow on September 30. The tour was supported by Animals as Leaders. In July 2011, the band announced their headlining North American "Saints&Sinners Tour" playing throughout November and December with Animals as Leaders and TesseracT. The band created a few medleys for this tour, and performed songs that they hadn't played in years. They co-headlined the 2012 Summer Slaughter under Cannibal Corpse with numerous other metal bands such as Exhumed, Job for a Cowboy, The Faceless, and Veil of Maya, followed by a co-headlining tour through Europe and UK with Periphery and The Safety Fire.

They also toured Japan and Australia with Animals as Leaders in November 2012.

Starting in February 2013, they toured with Coheed and Cambria.

In fall 2013, they embarked on The Future Sequence Tour, where they played The Parallax II: Future Sequence in full. The Faceless, The Contortionist, and The Safety Fire provided support.

On February 14, 2014, it was announced Between the Buried and Me would record and release a live album for The Parallax II: Future Sequence, playing it in its entirety with additional instruments, including a saxophone, percussionists, flute, and a string quartet. The release, titled Future Sequence: Live at the Fidelitorium, was released September 30, 2014.

=== Coma Ecliptic and Colors 10th Anniversary Tour (2015–2017) ===
On March 17, 2015, they announced that Coma Ecliptic would be released through Metal Blade Records on July 7, 2015, and released the song "Memory Palace" on April 3.

From 2015 - 2017, Between the Buried and Me went out on their Coma Ecliptic World Tour and headlined with / co-headlined for August Burns Red, Animals as Leaders, Devin Townsend Project, Fallujah, Enslaved, and The Contortionist.

The band released "Coma Ecliptic: Live" on April 28, 2017, which has their entire Coma Ecliptic album played live.

In the fall of 2017, Between the Buried and Me toured for the Colors 10th Anniversary Tour where they performed the whole album.

=== Automata and Sumerian Records (2018–2019) ===
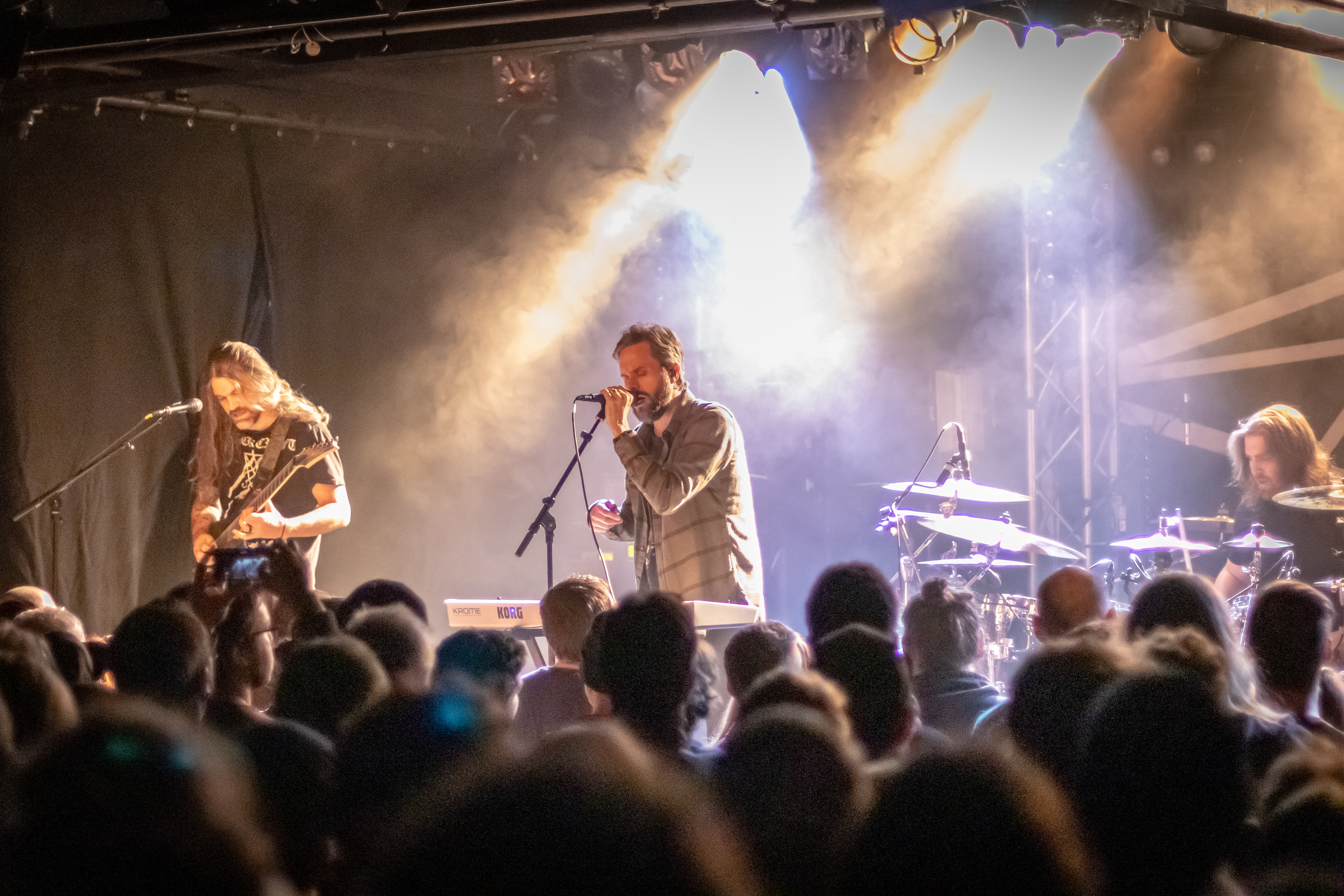
Between the Buried and Me performing in 2018

Recording of the band's upcoming eighth full-length album began on July 31, 2017 and finished on September 6, with the release date scheduled in early 2018.

On December 28, 2017, bassist Dan Briggs posted footage of a song they had finished recording separate from the eighth studio album completed in September 2017. It was their interpretation of The Dear Hunter's track "The Tank" for an exclusive 7-inch split with the band.

In January 2018, the band announced Automata, a two-part studio album. Automata I was announced a release date of March 9, 2018, via Sumerian Records. The second part, Automata II, was released on July 13, 2018.

Their "Between the Buried and Me Spring 2018 Tour" was announced, spanning March 2 to April 7, 2018, across the contiguous United States. The tour would be supported by The Dear Hunter with special guests Leprous. It was announced on the Thomas Giles Instagram that their exclusive split 7-inch single with The Dear Hunter would be available for VIP package buyers on the tour. The split 7-inch would contain each band recording their interpretation of a song from the other band.

The band headlined the entire 2018 portion of the Summer Slaughter tour. They were joined up with bands such as Born of Osiris, Veil of Maya, ERRA, The Agony Scene, Allegaeon, Terror Universal, Soreption, and Entheos.

In early 2019, they toured Automata II in the US beginning in February and ending in March. Opening acts were Astronoid and TesseracT, except for a few dates.

=== Postponed 20th anniversary tour and Colors II (2020–2024) ===
In spring 2020, the band was set to headline a 20th anniversary tour across North America, with the first set composed of songs spanning their career and the second set being The Great Misdirect performed in its entirety. Due to the COVID-19 pandemic, the band postponed the tour until it was safe to tour again. The tour was rebranded as a 21st anniversary tour in 2021 and kicked off in Atlanta on August 3 of that year.

The band revealed on November 16, 2020, that they were writing their upcoming tenth studio album and were recording it for a scheduled release sometime in 2021.

On June 24, 2021, the band announced the release of their new album, Colors II (the follow-up to 2007's Colors) through SiriusXM's Liquid Metal channel. The album was released on August 20, 2021. The album's first single, "Fix the Error", was released online on June 25, 2021, along with a music video on July 7.

The band announced in March 2023 a North American tour from June to July, in which they performed The Parallax II: Future Sequence in its entirety. It was the second tour without Dustie Waring following sexual assault allegations. His position was filled by Tristan Auman of Sometime in February from Charlotte, North Carolina. Waring had sat out on their previous Island in Limbo tour in Europe due to back issues, but later performed at a festival in September 2023 with the band following the allegations. Waring was dropped once again on their following tour in which they performed Colors and Colors II across two nights in each city. Waring and his lawyer threatened to sue the band following Waring's removal from the past two tours and the band's attempt to fire him.

=== The Blue Nowhere (2025–present) ===
Between the Buried and Me announced a 2025 US tour entitled "Comalaska", which featured the band playing Coma Ecliptic and Alaska in full every night, celebrating both albums' 10th and 20th anniversaries respectively, with support from Protest the Hero. They announced a European summer tour playing Colors in its entirety. On June 12, 2025, the band announced their next studio album, The Blue Nowhere, coinciding with the release of the album's first single, "Things We Tell Ourselves In The Dark". The album was released on September 12, 2025, and is the first without Dustie Waring since their 2005 album, Alaska, and their first release to be recorded with four members. Paul Waggoner recording all guitar tracks in place of Waring. It would be their first release after signing with Inside Out Music.

The band will tour the US in 2026 with a rotating lineup of supporting acts, including Imperial Triumphant, The World Is a Beautiful Place & I Am No Longer Afraid to Die, Thank You Scientist, and Fallujah. The band has stated that they will be performing a "new set" on this tour.

== Musical style and influences ==
Between the Buried and Me has been classified as progressive metalcore, progressive metal, technical death metal, metalcore, and avant-garde metal, along with various musical styles. Loudwire described their sound as a "special blend of soaring melodies, imaginative storytelling and ingeniously playful yet virtuosic eccentricities." The band's guitar work incorporates extensive sweep picking, frequently pulling influence from bluegrass music and jazz. Some of the band's songs have also incorporated elements of space music. Johnny Loftus of AllMusic stated that the band has a tendency to play thrash metal-inspired riffs. Frontman Tommy Giles Rogers employs both screaming and clean vocals, as well as death growls. According to Loftus: "The metal take on things can seemingly change in a flash as [Rogers] fleshes out his vocals and utilizes the keyboards to create something that sounds more like it should be on a Smashing Pumpkins album". The band's recorded catalogue also contains occasional sentimental ballads, such as "Desert of Song" from The Great Misdirect (2009), which employs acoustic guitar and slide guitar, and is sung by guitarist Paul Waggoner. Some of the band's styles have also been described as math rock and hardcore punk. The band was generally associated with the traditional metalcore style early in its career before fully embracing progressive elements on Alaska (2005) and Colors (2007).

The band's lyrics explore philosophical and science fiction topics. AllMusic called the band "a thinking man's metal outfit".

The band is known for frequently incorporating reprises into their arrangements.

On the band's cover album, The Anatomy Of, the band paid tribute to many of their diverse influences, including Sepultura, Metallica, Blind Melon, Mötley Crüe, Queen, King Crimson, Soundgarden, Faith No More, Pantera, Pink Floyd, Depeche Mode, Earth Crisis, Counting Crows, and The Smashing Pumpkins. Bassist Dan Briggs stated that some of the band's music pulls influence from Van Halen and Huey Lewis and the News.

=== Impact ===
Loudwire considered them to be one of the greatest metal bands of all time in 2016. The same publication wrote in 2025: "For over 20 years, Between the Buried and Me have been at the front of the pack in the world of progressive metal. Bold, adventurous, daring and readily willing, they truly embody what it means to be progressive and have made great evolutionary strides." The publication also said they were among progressive metal's "Big Four" along with Dream Theater, Opeth and Queensryche.

== Band members ==
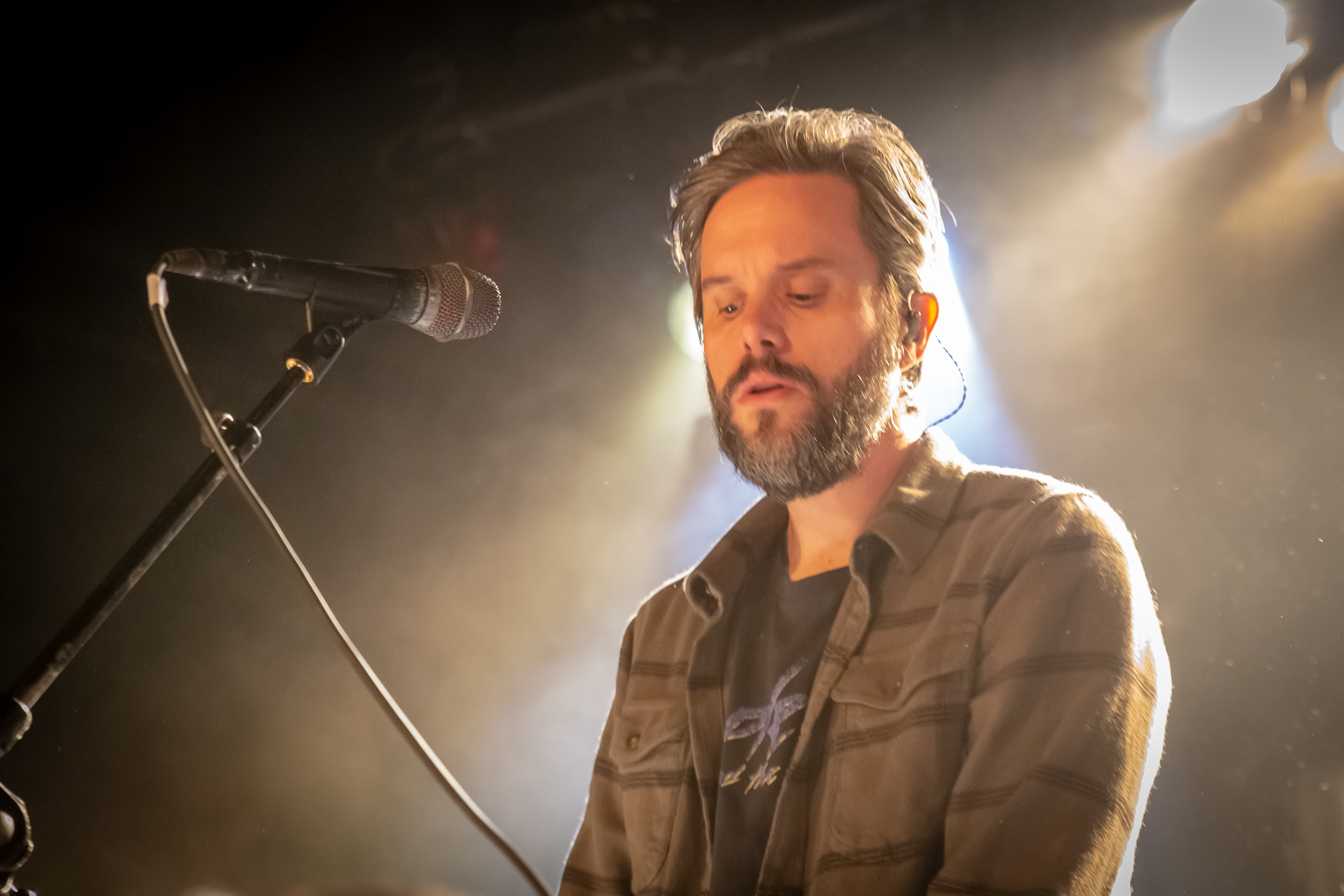
Tommy Giles Rogers

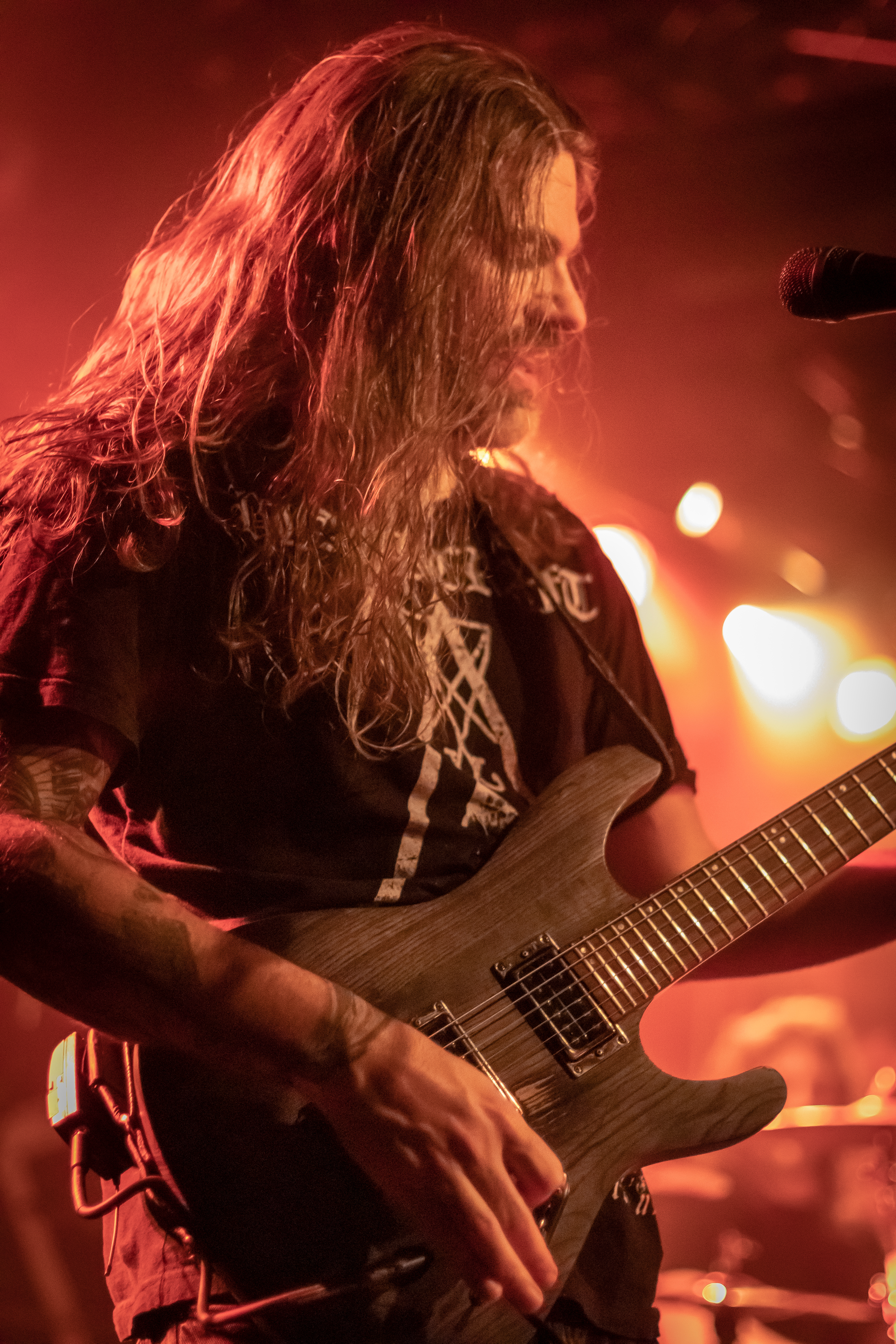
Paul Waggoner

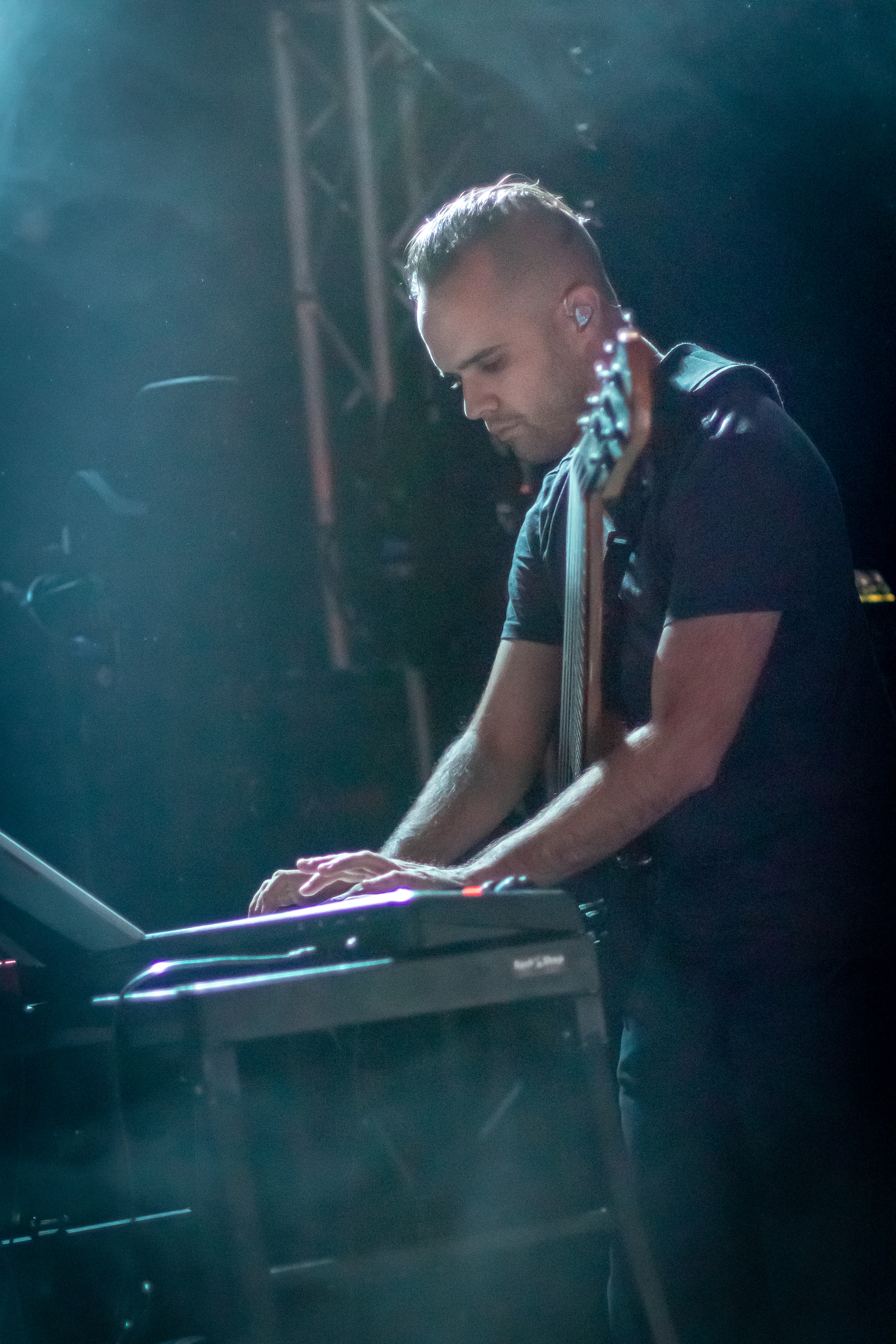
Dan Briggs

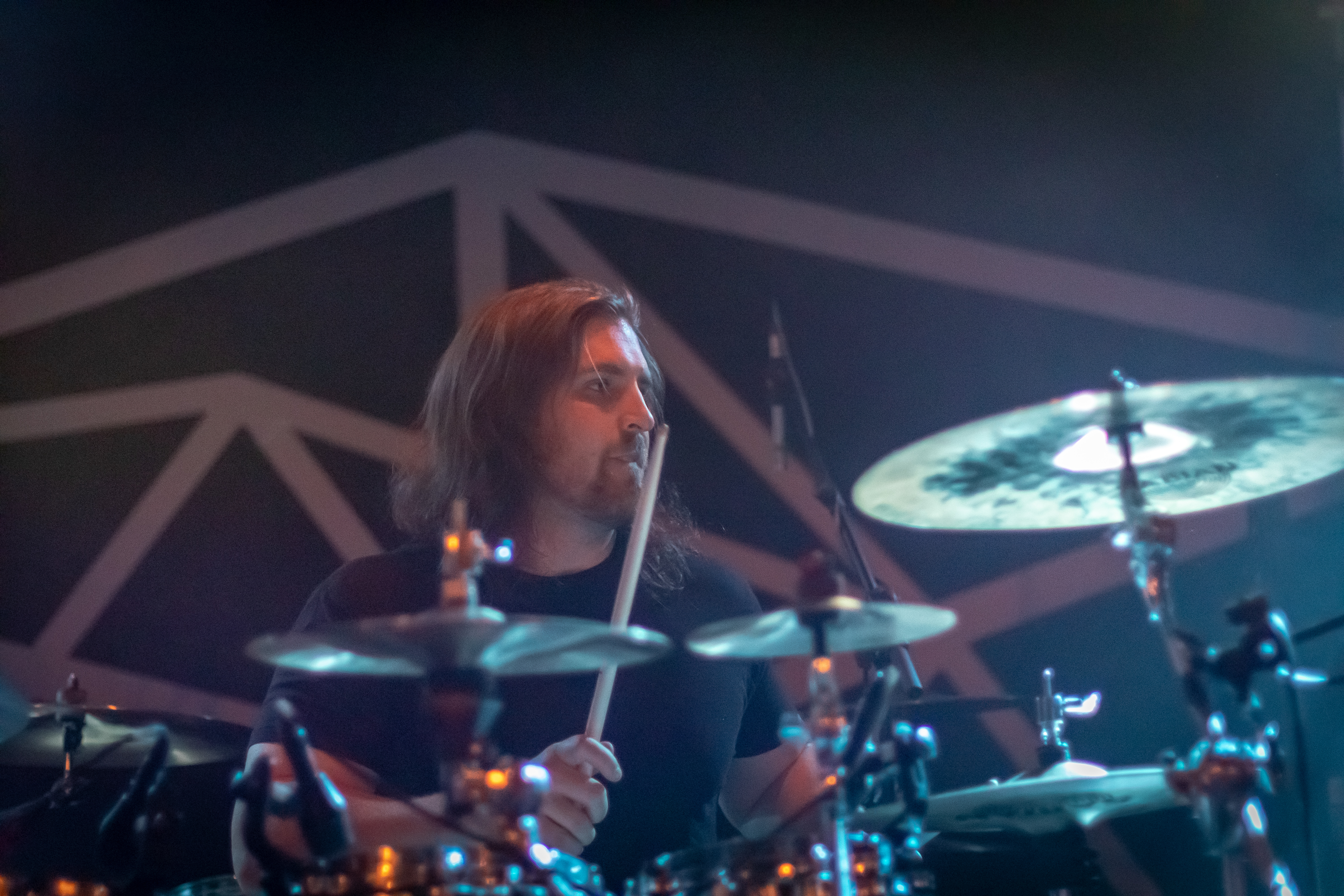
Blake Richardson

Current

- Tommy Giles Rogers – lead vocals, keyboards (2000–present)
- Paul Waggoner – lead guitar, backing and additional clean vocals (2000–present), rhythm guitar (2023–present)
- Dan Briggs – bass (2005–present), keyboards (2011–present), backing vocals (2005–2008)
- Blake Richardson – drums (2005–present) additional backing and unclean vocals (2018–present)

Touring

- Tristan Auman – rhythm and lead guitar (2023–present), backing vocals (2025–present)

Former

- Jason Schofield King – bass (2000–2004)
- Will Goodyear – drums, clean vocals (2000–2002)
- Marc Duncan – rhythm guitar (2000)
- Nicholas Shawn Fletcher – rhythm guitar (2000–2003)
- Michael Howard Reig – drums (2002–2003)
- Mark Castillo – drums (2003–2004)
- Shane Blay – rhythm guitar (2004)
- Jason Roe – drums (2004–2005)
- Kevin Falk – bass (2004–2005)
- Dustie Waring – rhythm guitar (2005–2023)

Timeline

== Discography ==
Studio albums

- Between the Buried and Me (2002)
- The Silent Circus (2003)
- Alaska (2005)
- The Anatomy Of (2006) (Note: Released as a cover album.)
- Colors (2007)
- The Great Misdirect (2009)
- The Parallax: Hypersleep Dialogues (2011) (Note: Released as a mini-album.)
- The Parallax II: Future Sequence (2012)
- Coma Ecliptic (2015)
- Automata I (2018)
- Automata II (2018)
- Colors II (2021)
- The Blue Nowhere (2025)
