= Blake Richardson (drummer) =

American drummer

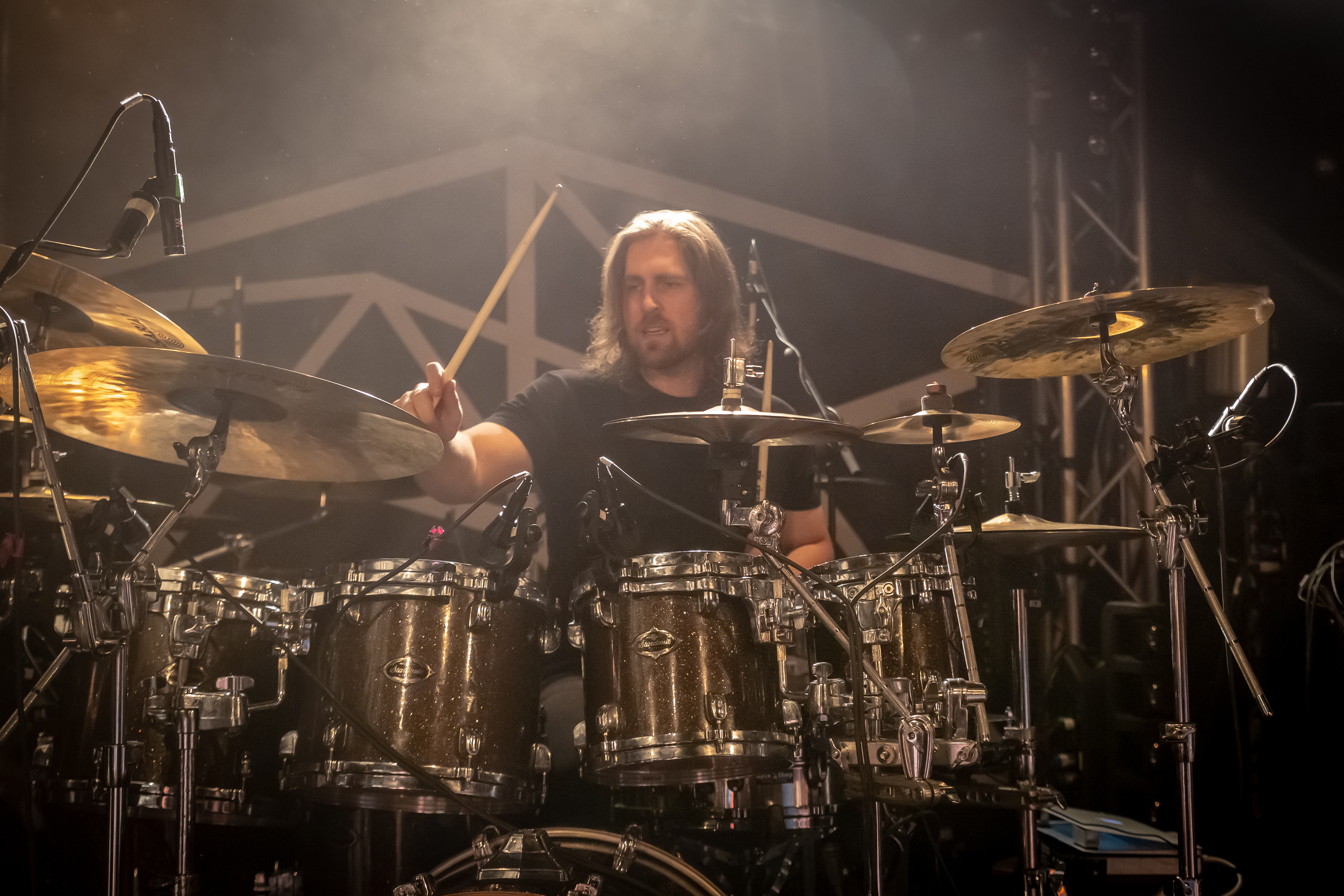
- Richardson with Between the Buried and Me in 2018

Background information
- Born: Cartland Blake Richardson; June 29, 1984 (age 42)
- Origin: North Carolina, United States
- Genres: Progressive metal; metalcore; technical death metal; progressive rock; deathcore
- Occupations: Drummer; musician
- Instruments: Drums, vocals
- Years active: 2001–present

Cartland Blake Richardson is an American musician who is the drummer for progressive metal band Between the Buried and Me, as well as Glass Casket. Joining in early 2005, Richardson replaced Between the Buried and Me's former drummer Jason Roe.

== Biography ==
Richardson attended middle school at Calvary Baptist Day School in Winston-Salem, North Carolina. He later attended Mt. Tabor High School and performed an annual drum solo for a school-club project named 'Spartan Spectacular'. Playing since he was 11 years old, he became an immediate fan of 1990s grunge music. Being inspired by bands such as Soundgarden, Nirvana, and Smashing Pumpkins, his passion for heavy music grew as much as his love for drumming did. After taking lessons for several years from local jazz percussionist/drummer Robert Crutchfield, he developed his skills and started playing with his first band, Glass Casket, at the age of 17. After significant touring throughout the US, he graduated high school in 2003 and attended NC State University for two years.

After getting an offer to play drums for home-state friends Between the Buried and Me he helped to start writing the band's third full-length album Alaska and finally left school in 2005 to tour full-time. Since then the band has toured relentlessly. Sharing the stage with friends in Black Dahlia Murder, Bleeding Through, Every Time I Die, and Dillinger Escape Plan helped land them a spot on Ozzfest 2006 with System of a Down and Ozzy Osbourne. After seemingly endless touring to support his first album with Between the Buried and Me, the band began writing for their fourth studio album Colors. This album helped push the band, as well as Richardson's drumming style, into the more progressive metal element. Not going unnoticed, the band's developed new sound and groundbreaking new album helped them earn a spot on the first ever "Progressive Nation Tour", which featured Dream Theater, Opeth, and Three.

== Style ==
Richardson's drumming is characterized by a fusion of death metal elements and jazz influences. Noted for his blast beats, odd timing, double bass drumming, and fill-heavy style, Richardson is considered a standout in his field. His favorite drummers include Terry Bozzio, Dennis Chambers, Dave Grohl, Simon Phillips, Dave Weckl, Morgan Ågren, Virgil Donati, Ken Schalk and Tomas Haake.

During the Progressive Nation 2008 tour Blake performed alongside Mike Portnoy (Dream Theater) where the two soloed together.

== Equipment ==
Tama Starclassic Bubinga - Custom Finish

- 2x 22 in × 14 in (560 mm × 360 mm) kick drums
- 10 in × 6.5 in (250 mm × 170 mm) rack tom
- 12 in × 7 in (300 mm × 180 mm) rack tom
- 14 in × 14 in (360 mm × 360 mm) rack tom
- 16 in × 14 in (410 mm × 360 mm) floor tom
- 20 in × 14 in (510 mm × 360 mm) gong bass drum
- 14 in × 6 in (360 mm × 150 mm) STARPHONIC brass snare drum

Sabian Cymbals:

- 9" Radia Cup Chime
- Sabian Low Max Stax
- 10" HH Duo Splash
- 18" HHX Evolution Crash
- 19" AAX Holy China
- 17" AAX X-treme China (on left)
- 21" AA Holy China (on right)
- 21" HH Raw Bell Dry Ride
- 14" HHX Evolution Hi-Hats
- 12" Chopper Cymbal
- 15" Birdbath (cracked)

Tama Iron Cobra Power Glide Single Kick Pedals, Tama Hardware

3A Vic Firth Drumsticks

Evans Drumheads (Hybrid on snare, Emad on kick drums, and EC2 SST on toms)

== Honors and awards ==
- Nominated for a GRAMMY Award, Best Metal Performance Condemned To The Gallows
