= Dan Briggs (musician) =

American bassist

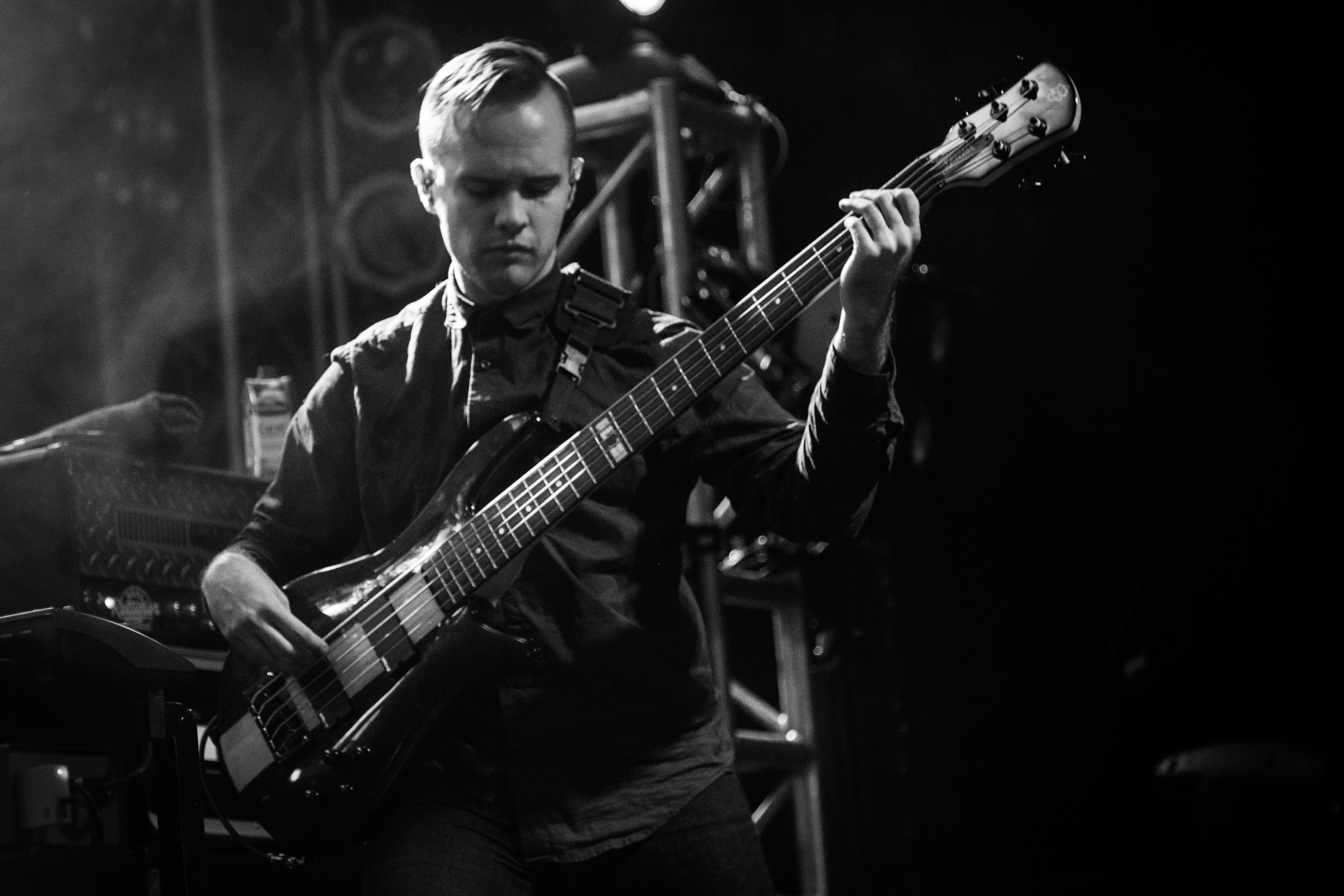
- Dan Briggs with BTBAM in 2015

Background information
- Born: September 27, 1984 (age 41)
- Genres: Progressive metal; progressive rock; jazz fusion
- Instruments: Bass, guitar, keyboards
- Member of: Between the Buried and Me; Orbs; Trioscapes; Nova Collective

Daniel Hanford Briggs (born September 27, 1984) is a musician from Erie, Pennsylvania, best known for playing bass and keyboards for the American progressive metal band Between the Buried and Me.

In addition to his bass duties with Between the Buried and Me, he also plays bass for jazz fusion band Trioscapes and progressive rock band Nova Collective as well as both guitar and bass in the band Orbs. He is a vegan and straight edge.

Dan uses Spector NS-5XL bass guitars with D'Addario EXL160-5 nickel wound strings, a Fender-reissued Sunn 300T amp and an Ampeg SVT-810E. Dan states that he chose a Spector over other bass guitars because he got it at the age of 16 and it was the "nicest bass in my price range." The Spector Bass guitar has stock EMGs and is tuned in C# Standard. Regarding guitar playing, Briggs has stated, "I never use the pick as I learned with my fingers."

== Honors and awards ==
- Nominated for a GRAMMY Award, Best Metal Performance Condemned To The Gallows
