= Paul Waggoner =

American guitarist

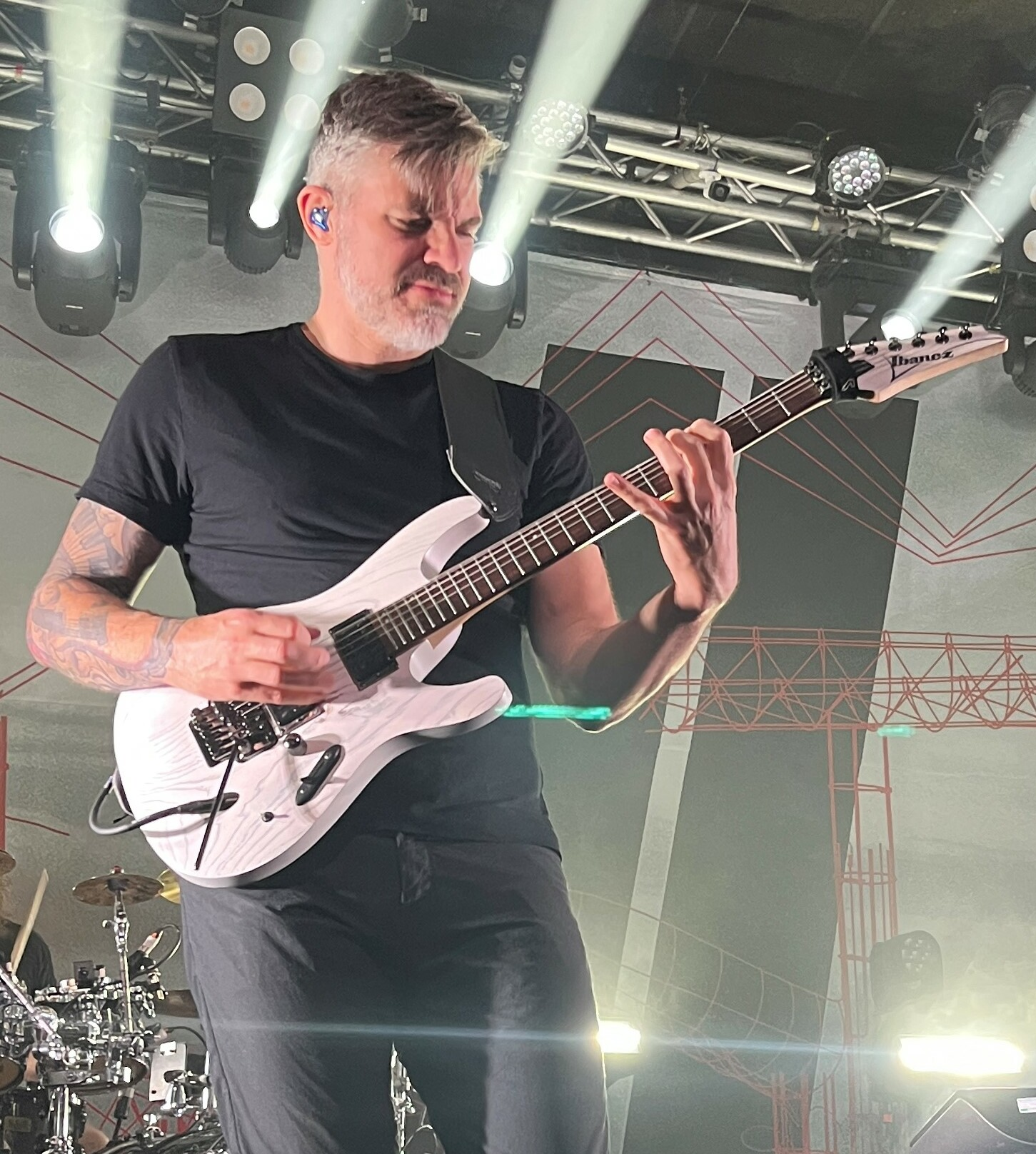
- Waggoner performing with Between the Buried and Me in 2023

Background information
- Born: Paul Andrew Waggoner; February 10, 1979 (age 47)
- Origin: United States
- Genres: Progressive metal, metalcore
- Occupation: Guitarist
- Member of: Between the Buried and Me; Prayer for Cleansing

Paul Andrew Waggoner (born February 10, 1979) is an American musician who is the lead guitarist of the progressive metal band Between the Buried and Me. He also played guitar in the metalcore band Prayer for Cleansing, as well as live guitar, as needed, for Lamb of God between 2010 and 2014.

== Influences ==
A fan of progressive music, Waggoner has cited Jason Becker, Tony MacAlpine, John Petrucci, Steve Vai and Pat Metheny as influences on his craft. Despite his mostly metal and jazz influential background, he has also listed Weezer frontman Rivers Cuomo as one of his first guitar idols.

== Equipment ==
Waggoner has played PRS guitars in the past, but now uses Ibanez guitars exclusively. He has signature guitars with Ibanez: the PWM20, PWM10 and PWM100. He also has signature pickups with Mojotone: the PW Hornet.

Waggoner uses D'Addario strings.

== Personal life ==
Waggoner is married with no children. He is vegan and straight edge.

Waggoner formerly owned and operated Nightflyer Roastworks (previously called Parliament Coffee Roasters), and Queen City Grounds, a small-batch specialty grade coffee roastery and cafe.

== Honors and awards ==
- Nominated for a GRAMMY Award, "Best Metal Performance" for Condemned To The Gallows
