= Amon Amarth discography =

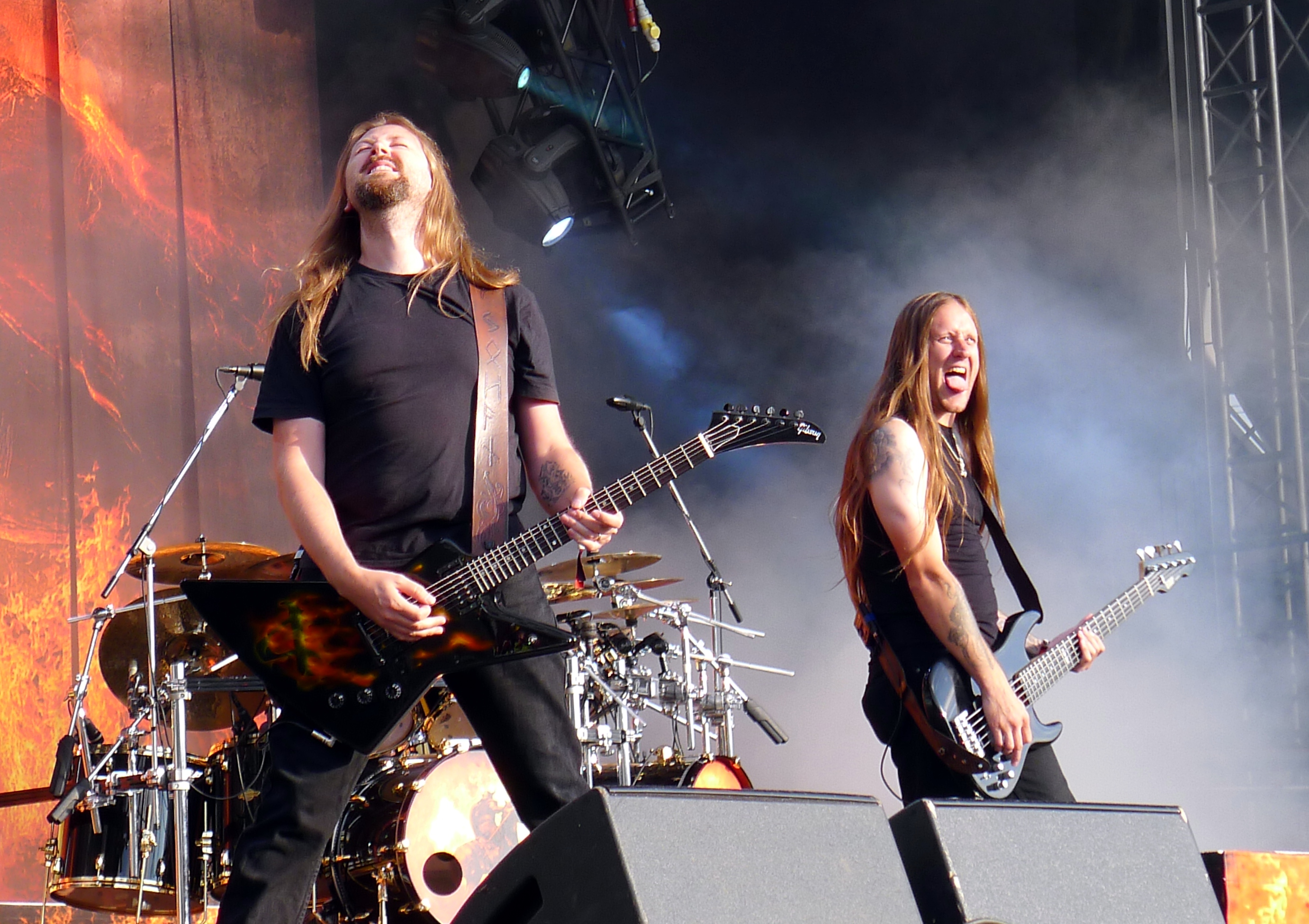
- Amon Amarth live at Tuska Open Air 2011
- Studio albums: 13
- Extended plays: 3
- Compilation albums: 1
- Video albums: 1
- Music videos: 23
- Demos: 3

This is a discography for the Swedish melodic death metal band Amon Amarth. The band is from Stockholm and was founded in 1992. Their lyrics mostly deal with the Vikings, their mythology and their history. The band comprises vocalist Johan Hegg, guitarists Olavi Mikkonen and Johan Söderberg, bassist Ted Lundström, and drummer Jocke Wallgren. Amon Amarth has released thirteen studio albums, one compilation album, three EPs, one video album, and twenty seven music videos.

== Albums ==
=== Studio albums ===
List of studio albums, with selected chart positions
| Title | Album details | Peak chart positions | | | | | | | | | | Certifications | Sales |
| Title | Album details | SWE | AUT | BEL | CAN | FIN | FRA | GER | SWI | UK | US | Certifications | Sales |
|---|---|---|---|---|---|---|---|---|---|---|---|---|---|
| Once Sent from the Golden Hall | Released: 10 February 1998; Label: Metal Blade; Formats: CD | — | — | — | — | — | — | — | — | — | — | | |
| The Avenger | Released: 2 November 1999; Label: Metal Blade; Formats: CD | — | — | — | — | — | — | — | — | — | — | | |
| The Crusher | Released: 8 May 2001; Label: Metal Blade; Formats: CD | — | — | — | — | — | — | — | — | — | — | | |
| Versus the World | Released: 14 January 2003 (US) 18 November 2002 (EU); Label: Metal Blade; Formats: CD | — | — | — | — | — | — | — | — | — | — | | US: 36,146+ |
| Fate of Norns | Released: 7 September 2004; Label: Metal Blade; Formats: CD, digital download | — | 56 | — | — | — | — | 31 | — | — | — | | US: 44,288+ |
| With Oden on Our Side | Released: 3 October 2006; Label: Metal Blade; Formats: CD, digital download | 21 | 27 | — | — | — | — | 21 | — | — | — | | US: 78,394+ |
| Twilight of the Thunder God | Released: 30 September 2008; Label: Metal Blade; Formats: CD, digital download | 11 | 14 | 69 | — | 10 | 116 | 6 | 21 | 126 | 50 | | US: 72,646+ |
| Surtur Rising | Released: 29 March 2011; Label: Metal Blade; Formats: CD, digital download | 8 | 12 | 45 | 19 | 16 | 146 | 8 | 20 | 75 | 34 | | US: 28,920+ |
| Deceiver of the Gods | Released: 25 June 2013; Label: Metal Blade; Formats: CD, digital download | 9 | 7 | 44 | — | 12 | 67 | 3 | 9 | 67 | 19 | | US: 17,000+ |
| Jomsviking | Released: 25 March 2016; Label: Metal Blade; Formats: CD, digital download | 5 | 1 | 18 | 8 | 4 | 38 | 1 | 3 | 30 | 19 | BVMI: Gold | US: 20,000+ |
| Berserker | Released: 3 May 2019; Label: Metal Blade; Formats: CD, digital download | 5 | 2 | 11 | 19 | 4 | 50 | 1 | 1 | 25 | 47 | | |
| The Great Heathen Army | Released: 5 August 2022; Label: Metal Blade; Formats: CD, digital download | 20 | 4 | 36 | — | 7 | — | 1 | 3 | 95 | — | | |
| The Allfather Awakens | Released: 2 October 2026; Label: Metal Blade; Formats: CD, digital download | 4 | 2 | — | — | 10 | 106 | 4 | 5 | — | — | | |
"—" denotes a recording that did not chart or was not released in that territory.

=== Compilation albums ===
| Title | Album details |
|---|---|
| Hymns to the Rising Sun | Released: 8 September 2010; Label: Metal Blade; Formats: CD, digital download |

=== Video albums ===
List of video albums, with selected chart positions
| Title | Album details | Peak chart positions | | Certifications |
| Title | Album details | SWE | GER | Certifications |
|---|---|---|---|---|
| Wrath of the Norsemen | Released: 12 May 2006; Label: Metal Blade; Formats: DVD | 2 | 91 | RIAA: Gold; MC: Platinum |

== EPs ==
| Year | EP details |
|---|---|
| Sorrow Throughout the Nine Worlds | Released: 5 April 1996; Label: Pulverised; Formats: CD, MCD |
| Under the Influence | Released: 21 June 2013; Label: Metal Blade; Formats: CD, digital download |
| Heathen Hammer | Released: 20 July 2022; Label: Metal Blade; Formats: CD (Supplement to Metal Hammer Germany 08/2022) |

== Music videos ==
| Year | Title | Director | Album |
|---|---|---|---|
| 2003 | "Death in Fire" | Michael Schneider | Versus the World |
| 2004 | "The Pursuit of Vikings" | Heiko Tippelt, Phillip Hirsch | Fate of Norns |
| 2006 | "Runes to My Memory" | Bill Schacht | With Oden on Our Side |
| 2007 | "Cry of the Black Birds" | Bill Schacht | With Oden on Our Side |
| 2008 | "Twilight of the Thunder God" | Dariusz Szermanowicz | Twilight of the Thunder God |
| 2009 | "Guardians of Asgaard" | Dariusz Szermanowicz, Pawel Krawczyk | Twilight of the Thunder God |
| 2011 | "Destroyer of the Universe" | David Brodsky | Surtur Rising |
| 2014 | "Father of the Wolf" | Ramon Boutviseth | Deceiver of the Gods |
| 2014 | "Deceiver of the Gods" | Soren Schaller | Deceiver of the Gods |
| 2016 | "First Kill" | Darek Szermanowicz | Jomsviking |
| 2016 | "At Dawn's First Light" | Darek Szermanowicz | Jomsviking |
| 2016 | "Raise Your Horns" | Vince Edwards | Jomsviking |
| 2017 | "The Way of Vikings" | Grupa 13 | Jomsviking |
| 2019 | "Raven's Flight" | Roboshobo | Berserker |
| 2019 | "Crack the Sky" | Roboshobo | Berserker |
| 2019 | "Mjölner, Hammer of Thor" | Roboshobo | Berserker |
| 2019 | "Shield Wall" | Phil Wallis | Berserker |
| 2020 | "Fafner's Gold" | Jörg Maas | Berserker |
| 2022 | "Put Your Back Into The Oar" | Ryan Mackfall | Heathen Hammer |
| 2022 | "Get In The Ring" | Dariusz Szermanowicz | The Great Heathen Army |
| 2022 | "The Great Heathen Army" | Pavel Trebukhin | The Great Heathen Army |
| 2022 | "Find a Way or Make One" | Mikis Fontagnier | The Great Heathen Army |
| 2022 | "Oden Owns You All" | Pavel Trebukhin | The Great Heathen Army |
| 2025 | "We Rule the Waves" | Pavel Trebukhin | The Allfather Awakens |
| 2026 | "Upphaf" | Pavel Trebukhin | The Allfather Awakens |
| 2026 | "Gjallarhorn" | Pavel Trebukhin | The Allfather Awakens |
| 2026 | "Eight Legs of Thunder" | Dariusz Szermanowicz | The Allfather Awakens |

== Demos ==
=== Demo 1 ===
Demo 1 is a demo self-released in 1991/1992. It is extremely rare and only a few copies exist. The demo was released under the band's first name, Scum, as a grindcore band.

Track listing

| No. | Title | Length |
|---|---|---|
| 1. | "Warriors of the Past" | 6:13 |
| 2. | "Epitaph" | 4:02 |
| 3. | "Light of Death" | 4:20 |
| Total length: | | 14:35 |

Credits

- Puppe M. – vocals
- Olli M. − lead guitar
- Vesa M. − rhythm guitar
- Petri T. − bass
- Niko K. − drums

=== Thor Arise ===
Thor Arise is a demo recorded in 1993. It was never initially released due to its low production standards. The album features "Sabbath Bloody Sabbath", a cover of the Black Sabbath song. The song "Thor Arise" was re-recorded as a bonus track on the digipak version of The Avenger. "Risen from the Sea" was re-recorded on The Crusher. The entire demo was re-released with the "Viking Edition" of Versus the World.

Track listing

| No. | Title | Length |
|---|---|---|
| 1. | "Risen from the Sea" | 5:43 |
| 2. | "Atrocious Humanity" | 5:54 |
| 3. | "Army of Darkness" | 5:26 |
| 4. | "Thor Arise" | 6:30 |
| 5. | "Sabbath Bloody Sabbath" (Black Sabbath cover) | 4:22 |
| Total length: | | 27:55 |

Credits

- Johan Hegg − vocals
- Olavi Mikkonen − lead guitar
- Anders Hansson − rhythm guitar
- Ted Lundström − bass
- Niko Kaukinen − drums

=== The Arrival of the Fimbul Winter ===
The Arrival of the Fimbul Winter is a demo self-released in 1994. Its original release was limited and consisted of 1000 copies. The demo was released on three different colour tapes with different styles. The "labels" for the demo are not professionally made, and were created by the band for the release of the demo. Both "Burning Creation" and "The Arrival of the Fimbul Winter" were re-released on Sorrow Throughout the Nine Worlds, "Without Fear" was re-recorded on Once Sent from the Golden Hall.

Track listing

| No. | Title | Length |
|---|---|---|
| 1. | "Burning Creation" | 4:48 |
| 2. | "The Arrival of the Fimbul Winter" | 4:38 |
| 3. | "Without Fear" | 4:42 |
| Total length: | | 14:08 |

Credits

- Johan Hegg − vocals
- Olavi Mikkonen − lead guitar
- Anders Hansson − rhythm guitar
- Ted Lundström − bass
- Niko Kaukinen − drums
