= Hymns to the Rising Sun =

Greatest hits album by Amon Amarth
- Released: 8 September 2010
- Recorded: 1998, 2002, 2004, 2006, 2008
- Genre: Melodic death metal
- Length: 67:36
- Label: Metal Blade

Hymns to the Rising Sun is a greatest hits album by Swedish melodic death metal band Amon Amarth. It was released through Metal Blade Records on 8 September 2010 in Japan.

== Track listing ==
No.	Title	From	Length
1.	"Twilight of the Thunder God"	Twilight of the Thunder God	4:08
2.	"Guardians of Asgaard"	Twilight of the Thunder God	4:23
3.	"Live for the Kill"	Twilight of the Thunder God	4:09
4.	"Varyags of Miklagaard"	Twilight of the Thunder God	4:18
5.	"Runes to My Memory"	With Oden on Our Side	4:32
6.	"Cry of the Black Birds"	With Oden on Our Side	3:49
7.	"Hermod's Ride to Hel"	With Oden on Our Side	4:40
8.	"Asator"	With Oden on Our Side	3:04
9.	"Pursuit of Vikings"	Fate of Norns	4:30
10.	"The Fate of Norns"	Fate of Norns	5:57
11.	"Death in Fire"	Versus the World	4:54
12.	"Where Silent Gods Stand Guard"	Versus the World	5:56
13.	"Victorious March"	Once Sent from the Golden Hall	7:55
14.	"Children of the Grave" (Black Sabbath cover)	The Metal Forge Volume Three: A Tribute To Black Sabbath	5:21
Total length:			67:36
