= Surtur Rising =

Studio album by Amon Amarth
- Released: 29 March 2011
- Studio: Fascination Street Studio, Örebro, Sweden
- Genre: Melodic death metal
- Length: 48:40
- Label: Metal Blade
- Producer: Jens Bogren

Amon Amarth chronology
Twilight of the Thunder God (2008)	Surtur Rising (2011)	Deceiver of the Gods (2013)

Surtur Rising is the eighth studio album by Swedish melodic death metal band Amon Amarth. It is named after the mythical giant, Surtr. The album was released on 29 March 2011. The album debuted at number 34 on the American Billboard 200 chart as well as number 19 on the Canadian album charts.

On 27 June 2011, the band released a music video, with footage taken during a live performance in Philadelphia, Pennsylvania, and directed by David Brodsky, for the third track on the album, "Destroyer of the Universe".

== Reception ==
Professional ratings
Aggregate scores
Source	Rating
Metacritic	82/100
Review scores
Source	Rating
AllMusic	4.5/5 stars
Blabbermouth.net	9/10 stars
Metal Hammer	7/7 stars
PopMatters	8/10 stars
Revolver	3/5 stars

Surtur Rising was released to universal acclaim. Germany's Metal Hammer chose the album as the album of the month in March 2011.

== Track listing ==
All tracks are written by Amon Amarth.

Standard CD edition
No.	Title	Length
1.	"War of the Gods"	4:33
2.	"Töck's Taunt – Loke's Treachery Part II"	5:58
3.	"Destroyer of the Universe"	3:41
4.	"Slaves of Fear"	4:25
5.	"Live Without Regrets"	5:03
6.	"The Last Stand of Frej"	5:37
7.	"For Victory or Death"	4:30
8.	"Wrath of the Norsemen"	3:44
9.	"A Beast Am I"	3:37
10.	"Doom Over Dead Man"	7:32
Total length:		48:40

iTunes edition bonus track
No.	Title	Length
11.	"Aerials" (System of a Down cover)	3:39

Japanese edition bonus track
No.	Title	Length
11.	"War Machine" (Kiss cover)	3:35

Deluxe CD/DVD edition bonus tracks
No.	Title	Length
11.	"Balls to the Wall" (Accept Cover)	5:22
12.	"War Machine" (Kiss cover)	3:35

Digipak edition

The digipack edition includes a 10-track audio CD and a bonus Live DVD.

The length of the last track, "Doom over dead Man", is listed as 7:32 on the back of the album, but skipping to the track or ripping it produces a song length of 5:56. An instrumental part 1:36 long is hidden in the pregap between tracks 9 and 10, which can only be heard by rewinding or playing straight through.

Live DVD

This DVD, included in the digipack and deluxe editions, contains over four hours of live concert footage filmed during the "Bloodshed Over Bochum" concert series in 2008 where Amon Amarth played the first four albums on four successive nights.

Once Sent from the Golden Hall
No.	Title	Length
1.	"Ride for Vengeance"
2.	"The Dragon's Flight Across the Waves"
3.	"Without Fear"
4.	"Victorious March"
5.	"Friends of the Suncross"
6.	"Abandoned"
7.	"Amon Amarth"
8.	"Once Sent from the Golden Hall"

The Avenger
No.	Title	Length
1.	"Bleed for Ancient Gods"
2.	"The Last with Pagan Blood"
3.	"North Sea Storm"
4.	"Avenger"
5.	"God, His Son and Holy Whore"
6.	"Metalwrath"
7.	"Legend of a Banished Man"

The Crusher
No.	Title	Length
1.	"Bastards of a Lying Breed"
2.	"Masters of War"
3.	"The Sound of Eight Hooves"
4.	"Risen from the Sea"
5.	"As Long as the Raven Flies"
6.	"A Fury Divine"
7.	"Annihilation of Hammerfest"
8.	"The Fall Through Ginnungagap"
9.	"Releasing Surtur's Fire"

Versus the World
No.	Title	Length
1.	"Death in Fire"
2.	"For the Stabwounds in Our Backs"
3.	"Where Silent Gods Stand Guard"
4.	"Versus the World"
5.	"Across the Rainbow Bridge"
6.	"Down the Slopes of Death"
7.	"Thousand Years of Oppression"
8.	"Bloodshed"
9.	"...And Soon the World Will Cease to Be"

Vinyl picture disc editions

A 2-sided vinyl LP picture disc is also available in the North American market with the following 10 tracks, and the European market edition includes a 4-sided vinyl LP picture disc with the following 10 tracks and "Balls to the Wall" (Accept cover) bonus track, with the fourth side etched.

== Personnel ==
Production and performance credits are adapted from the album liner notes.

Amon Amarth

- Johan Hegg – vocals
- Olavi Mikkonen – lead guitar
- Johan Söderberg – rhythm guitar
- Ted Lundström – bass
- Fredrik Andersson – drums

Production

- Jens Bogren – production, mixing, mastering
- Urban Näsvall – drumtech
- Martin Jacobsson – orchestral arrangements
- Dark Passenger Orchestra – orchestra
- Tom Thiel – cover artwork
- Thomas Ewerhard – design, layout
- Steve Brown – photos

Guest musicians

- Simon Solomon – guitar solo on "The last Stand of Frej" and "A Beast am I"

== Charts ==
Chart (2011)	Peak position
Austrian Albums (Ö3 Austria)	12
Belgian Albums (Ultratop Flanders)	45
Belgian Albums (Ultratop Wallonia)	54
Canadian Albums (Billboard)	19
Dutch Albums (Album Top 100)	62
Finnish Albums (Suomen virallinen lista)	16
French Albums (SNEP)	146
German Albums (Offizielle Top 100)	8
Irish Albums (IRMA)	76
Scottish Albums (OCC)	80
Swedish Albums (Sverigetopplistan)	8
Swiss Albums (Schweizer Hitparade)	20
UK Albums (OCC)	75
UK Independent Albums (OCC)	10
UK Rock & Metal Albums (OCC)	6
US Billboard 200	34
US Independent Albums (Billboard)	6
US Top Hard Rock Albums (Billboard)	1
US Top Rock Albums (Billboard)	7
US Top Tastemaker Albums (Billboard)	10
