= Wrath of the Norsemen =

Video by Amon Amarth
- Released: 12 May 2006
- Genre: Melodic death metal
- Length: 443:46
- Label: Metal Blade

Professional ratings
Review scores
| Source | Rating |
|---|---|
| Metal-Rules | 4.5/5 stars |

Wrath of the Norsemen is a live DVD by Swedish melodic death metal band Amon Amarth. It features live footage of the band playing their music. It also contains interviews and behind-the-scenes footage. The DVD was certified gold by the RIAA.

== Track listing ==
=== Disc one ===
Also included backstage and other footage.

Live in Cologne, Germany – 16 August 2005
| No. | Title | Length |
|---|---|---|
| 1. | "Intro" | 1:52 |
| 2. | "An Ancient Sign of Coming Storm" | 4:36 |
| 3. | "Pursuit of Vikings" | 5:57 |
| 4. | "Ride for Vengeance" | 4:55 |
| 5. | "Masters of War" | 5:16 |
| 6. | "The Last with Pagan Blood" | 5:38 |
| 7. | "Once Sealed in Blood" | 5:23 |
| 8. | "Bastards of a Lying Breed" | 5:41 |
| 9. | "Fate of Norns" | 6:01 |
| 10. | "1000 Years of Oppression" | 6:06 |
| 11. | "Versus the World" | 5:55 |
| 12. | "North Sea Storm" | 5:29 |
| 13. | "Releasing Surtur's Fire" | 5:32 |
| 14. | "Annihilation of Hammerfest" | 5:42 |
| 15. | "Friends of the Suncross" | 5:02 |
| 16. | "Bloodshed" | 5:30 |
| 17. | "Amon Amarth" | 11:54 |
| 18. | "For the Stabwounds in Our Backs" | 5:32 |
| 19. | "Where Silent Gods Stand Guard" | 6:53 |
| 20. | "Bleed for Ancient Gods" | 4:25 |
| 21. | "Victorious March" | 7:56 |
| 22. | "Death in Fire" | 7:44 |
| 23. | "The Vikings Are Coming – A look behind the scenes in Cologne" | 28:15 |
| Total length: | | 02:37:14 |

=== Disc two ===
Live at Summer Breeze festival, Abtsgmünd – 18 August 2005
| No. | Title | Length |
|---|---|---|
| 1. | "Intro" | 1:23 |
| 2. | "An Ancient Sign of Coming Storm" | 4:37 |
| 3. | "Pursuit of Vikings" | 6:47 |
| 4. | "Releasing Surtur's Fire" | 6:00 |
| 5. | "Masters of War" | 5:24 |
| 6. | "Fate of Norns" | 6:12 |
| 7. | "1000 Years of Oppression" | 7:42 |
| 8. | "Versus the World" | 6:18 |
| 9. | "For the Stabwounds in Our Backs" | 4:57 |
| 10. | "Victorious March" | 8:00 |
| 11. | "Death in Fire" | 7:41 |

Live at the Metal Blade Rrröööaaarrr, Stuttgart, LKA – 2 October 2005
| No. | Title | Length |
|---|---|---|
| 1. | "Sorrow Throughout the Nine Worlds" | 7:41 |
| 2. | "Dragons Flight Across the Waves" | 6:02 |
| 3. | "God His Son and Holy Whore" | 4:26 |
| 4. | "The Sound of Eight Hooves" | 5:46 |
| 5. | "Thor Arise" | 5:03 |
| 6. | "Fall Through Ginnungagap" | 5:50 |
| 7. | "Burning Creation" | 5:32 |
| 8. | "And Soon the World Will Cease to Be" | 6:35 |
| 9. | "Valkyries Ride" | 5:39 |
| 10. | "Pursuit of Vikings" | 6:00 |
| 11. | "Beheading of a King" | 5:38 |
| 12. | "Revenge of the Zombie (Six Feet Under cover)" | 4:11 |
| 13. | "Death in Fire" | 5:42 |
| Total length: | | 02:16:35 |

=== Disc three ===
Live at the Wacken Open Air 2004 – 6 August 2004
| No. | Title | Length |
|---|---|---|
| 1. | "Where Silent Gods Stand Guard" | 5:59 |
| 2. | "The Sound of Eight Hooves" | 4:56 |
| 3. | "Avenger" | 7:49 |
| 4. | "Death in Fire" | 5:40 |
| 5. | "Pursuit of Vikings" | 4:41 |
| 6. | "Bastards of a Lying Breed" | 5:53 |
| 7. | "Masters of War" | 5:45 |
| 8. | "Versus the World" | 5:26 |
| 9. | "Bleed for Ancient Gods" | 6:04 |

Live in Ludwigsburg, Rockfabrik, Germany – record release show for "Fate of Norns" – 5 September 2004
| No. | Title | Length |
|---|---|---|
| 1. | "For the Stabwounds in Our Backs" | 5:47 |
| 2. | "Versus the World" | 6:27 |
| 3. | "Masters of War" | 5:40 |
| 4. | "North Sea Storm" | 6:13 |
| 5. | "Thousand Years of Oppression" | 5:57 |
| 6. | "Bloodshed" | 5:38 |
| 7. | "The Last with Pagan Blood" | 6:28 |
| 8. | "An Ancient Sign of Coming Storm" | 5:28 |
| 9. | "Pursuit of Vikings" | 4:47 |
| 10. | "Fate of Norns" | 6:27 |
| 11. | "Once Sealed in Blood" | 6:38 |
| 12. | "Death in Fire" | 5:01 |
| 13. | "The Sound of Eight Hooves" | 5:49 |
| 14. | "Bleed for Ancient Gods" | 6:37 |
| 15. | "Where Silent Gods Stand Guard" | 6:11 |
| 16. | "Victorious March" | 8:36 |
| Total length: | | 02:29:57 |

== Credits ==
=== Band members ===
- Johan Hegg – vocals
- Olavi Mikkonen – lead guitar
- Johan Söderberg – rhythm guitar
- Ted Lundström – bass
- Fredrik Andersson – drums

=== Production ===
- Amon Amarth – arrangements, production
- Anders Eriksson – post production
- Thomas Ewerhard – design, cover art
- Harris Johns – mastering, mixing
- Achim Kohler – mastering, mixing

== Release dates ==
| Region | Date |
|---|---|
| Austria, Germany, Switzerland | 12 May 2006 |
| Rest of Europe | 15 May 2006 |
| US, Canada | 29 May 2006 |
