= Gimme Radio =

Internet radio in San Francisco

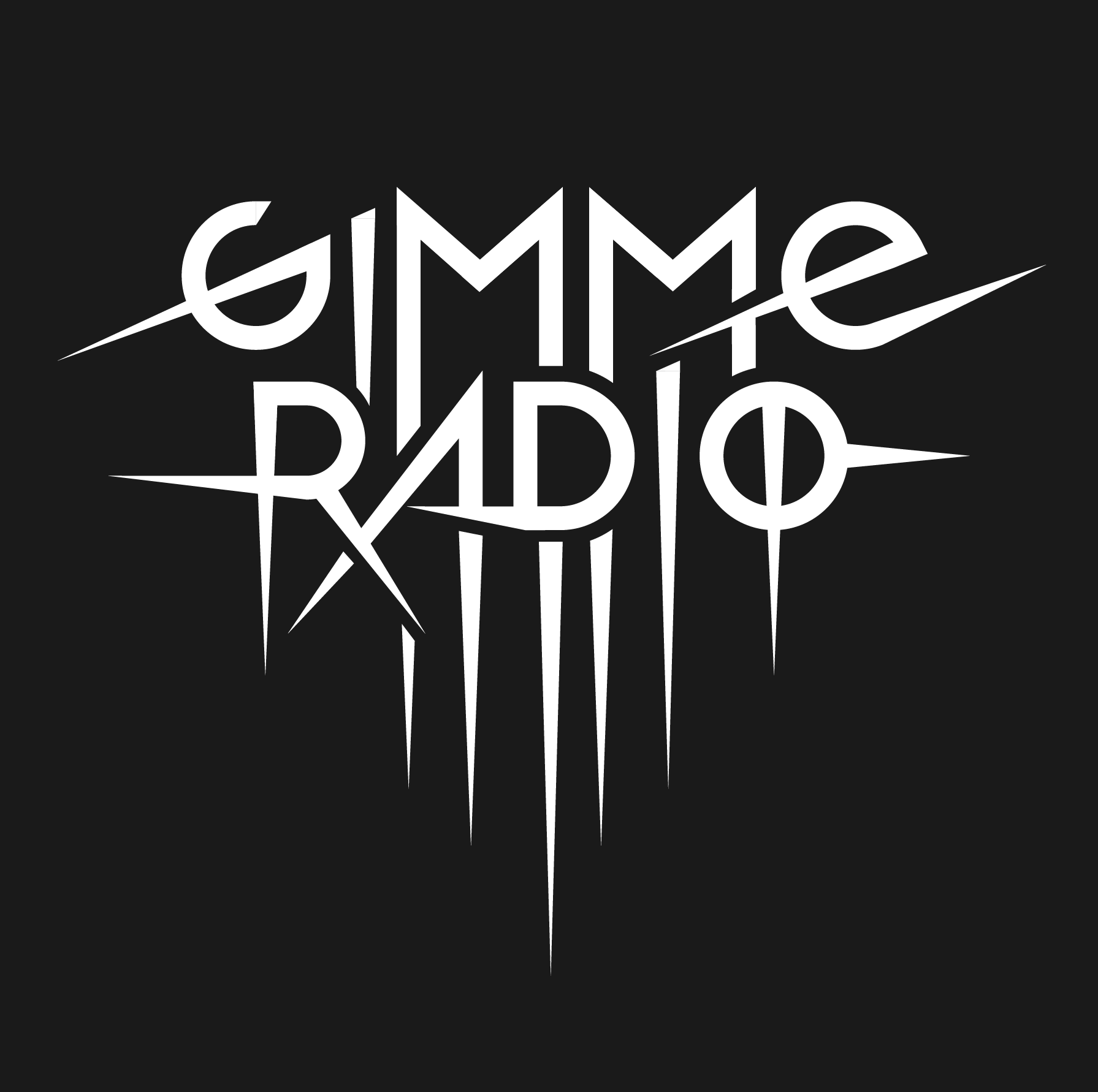
- Industry: Internet radio
- Founded: June 2017
- Defunct: April 2023
- Headquarters: San Francisco, California
- Key people: Tyler Lenane; David Rosenberg; Jon Maples
- Website: gimmeradio.com

Gimme Radio was an Internet radio station and online store established in June 2017. Based in San Francisco, California, it was founded as an advertising-free service. Gimme broadcast heavy metal music 24/7 and among its DJs were Megadeth's Dave Mustaine, Lamb of God's Randy Blythe and Amon Amarth's Johan Hegg.

Gimme Radio has been described as the first streaming platform dedicated exclusively to heavy metal.

== History ==
Gimme Radio was co-founded by Tyler Lenane (Chief Executive Officer), David Rosenberg (Chief Operating Officer), Jon Maples (Chief Product Officer) and Andrew Gilliland (Chief Creative Officer), all of whom have previous experience at streaming services: Lenane is the former business development executive at Apple Music, Rosenberg is the former head of distribution partnerships at Google Play, and Maples previously served as vice president of product at Rhapsody and 8tracks. Gimme Radio is the first streaming service of Gimme Media.

They founded the radio as a response to the streaming services which have often "left [the metal community] out" of their focuses and innovations, despite being highlighted as the most loyal demographic by genre in 2015 on Spotify, with its fans relying on more traditional formats such as vinyls and CDs. Around 50% of the music played on Gimme Radio were premieres from established acts and a considerable portion were underground music. Gimme had no sponsors and depended exclusively on sellings, including exclusive vinyl, collectible items and enabling listeners to purchase the records which were playing at the moment.

Gimme Radio was curated by and associated with many musicians, music journalists, producers and label affiliates, in a freeform, non-playlist approach. Among its radio shows were "The Dave Mustaine Show", "The Power Remains" with Randy Blythe, and "Hammer of the North" with Johan Hegg. Other associates and DJs included Dave Catching, Ben Weinman, Albert Mudrian, Carlos Ramirez and a rotating roster of Metal Blade and Nuclear Blast guest DJs. JJ Koczan, editor of The Obelisk webzine, hosted the specialty show "The Obelisk Show", dedicated to stoner, doom and sludge metal.

At the end of 2017, Gimme Radio released mobile applications for Android and iOS operating systems.

In November 2018, Gimme announced a membership subscription tier called The Vault which enabled its members to listen to all its previous programs, listen to them offline, new radio shows and other exclusive features. On the 17th of that month, Gimme celebrated its first anniversary with a show co-sponsored by Decibel.

In February 2019, Gimme announced the launching of Gimme Country, an online country music radio that followed the same format as Gimme Radio, which led to the creation of Gimme Metal to differentiate it. Its first four DJs were Brandy Clark, Russ Tolman, Joshua Hedley and Dillon Carmichael.

In April 2023, Tyler Lenane announced the shutdown of Gimme Radio, as well as their respective Gimme Metal and Gimme Country apps due to a lack of finances needed to keep the company running.
