= Berserker (Amon Amarth album) =

Studio album by Amon Amarth
- Released: 3 May 2019
- Genre: Melodic death metal
- Length: 56:45
- Label: Metal Blade
- Producer: Jay Ruston

Amon Amarth chronology
Jomsviking (2016)	Berserker (2019)	The Great Heathen Army (2022)

Singles from Berserker
- 1. "Raven's Flight" Released: 19 March 2019; 2. "Crack the Sky" Released: 17 April 2019

Berserker is the eleventh studio album by Swedish melodic death metal band Amon Amarth. It was released on 3 May 2019 through Metal Blade Records. The album was produced by Jay Ruston and marks the first album by the band to feature drummer Jocke Wallgren, who joined the band in 2016.

== Critical reception ==
Exclaim! rated the album 8/10, describing the band's "sound that emphasized strong, triumphant riffage and bombastic songwriting" and stated that the album "features some of their strongest material" since Twilight of the Thunder God. Loudwire named it one of the 50 best metal albums of 2019.

== Track listing ==
All songs written by Amon Amarth

No.	Title	Length
1.	"Fafner's Gold"	5:00
2.	"Crack the Sky"	3:49
3.	"Mjölner, Hammer of Thor"	4:42
4.	"Shield Wall"	3:46
5.	"Valkyria"	4:43
6.	"Raven's Flight"	5:20
7.	"Ironside"	4:30
8.	"The Berserker at Stamford Bridge"	5:13
9.	"When Once Again We Can Set Our Sails"	4:24
10.	"Skoll and Hati"	4:27
11.	"Wings of Eagles"	4:03
12.	"Into the Dark"	6:48
Total length:		56:45

== Personnel ==
=== Amon Amarth ===
- Johan Hegg − vocals
- Olavi Mikkonen − lead guitar
- Johan Söderberg − rhythm guitar
- Ted Lundström − bass
- Jocke Wallgren − drums

=== Production ===
- Jay Ruston − production
- Michael Lord – orchestration on "Into the Dark"

=== Cover art ===
- Brent Elliott White – cover art, interior art

== Charts ==
Chart (2019)	Peak position
Australian Albums (ARIA)	19
Austrian Albums (Ö3 Austria)	2
Belgian Albums (Ultratop Flanders)	11
Belgian Albums (Ultratop Wallonia)	48
Canadian Albums (Billboard)	19
Czech Albums (ČNS IFPI)	67
Dutch Albums (Album Top 100)	57
Finnish Albums (Suomen virallinen lista)	4
French Albums (SNEP)	50
German Albums (Offizielle Top 100)	1
Hungarian Albums (MAHASZ)	12
Norwegian Albums (VG-lista)	33
Polish Albums (ZPAV)	27
Portuguese Albums (AFP)	16
Scottish Albums (OCC)	9
Spanish Albums (PROMUSICAE)	20
Swedish Albums (Sverigetopplistan)	5
Swiss Albums (Schweizer Hitparade)	1
UK Albums (OCC)	25
US Billboard 200	47
