= With Oden on Our Side =

Studio album by Amon Amarth
- Released: 22 September 2006
- Recorded: May–June 2006
- Studio: Fascination Street Studio, Örebro, Sweden
- Genre: Melodic death metal
- Length: 42:17
- Label: Metal Blade
- Producer: Jens Bogren

Amon Amarth chronology
Fate of Norns (2004)	With Oden on Our Side (2006)	Twilight of the Thunder God (2008)

With Oden on Our Side is the sixth studio album by Swedish melodic death metal band Amon Amarth, and their first album to enter the Billboard charts, the Top Heatseekers and the Independent Albums chart, peaking at number 15 and number 26 respectively.

It was recorded in May and June 2006 and was released in Europe on 22 September 2006 by Metal Blade Records. A limited edition digipak was also released with a second disc that includes live songs, demos, and unreleased recordings. With Oden on Our Side was also released on a limited red LP. The songs "Runes to My Memory" and "Cry of the Black Birds" were both made into music videos, with the first single being featured in the 2011 video game Saints Row: The Third by developer Volition.

== Style ==
With Oden on Our Side takes on a heavier approach compared to their previous album Fate of Norns; according to vocalist Johan Hegg, in an interview with Dutch metal magazine Aardschok, the album would go back to their roots such as their debut, Once Sent from the Golden Hall. When asked about the meaning of the album's title, Hegg remarked:

Well, it kind of has several meanings to it. Oden is, of course, the highest god in Scandinavian mythology, and he's the god of warfare, wisdom, poetry, and artistry. The reason we chose the title is that it suited the lyrical concepts of the album and signified the feeling we had during the writing and recording of the album. We literally felt as if we had the Gods on our side.

— PyroMusic interview with Johan Hegg

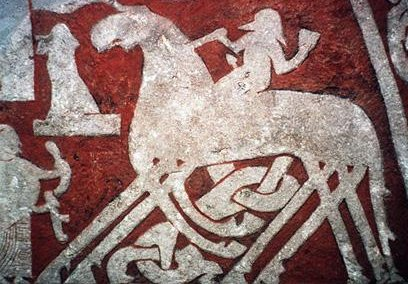
The inspiration for the album art is of a depiction of Odin riding his eight-legged horse Sleipnir on the Tjängvide image stone.

== Cover art ==
The album cover art features the Norse God Odin riding on his fabled octopedal horse Sleipnir in a depiction borrowed from the Tjängvide image stone. The background depicts the Valknut, a symbol whose meaning is uncertain, though archeological evidence suggests it to be associated with Odin. Letters of the Runic alphabet can be seen on the edges of the triangles forming the Valknut. The Runes on top spell out "With Oden on our Side", whereas the bottom right runes spell "Amon Amarth" using characters from the Elder Futhark.

== Reception ==
Professional ratings
Review scores
Source	Rating
AllMusic	3.5/5 stars
Blabbermouth.net	8/10

Since its release, With Oden on Our Side has received favorable reviews. Greg Prato of AllMusic gave the album three and a half stars naming it a competent example of the melodic death metal genre, stating that Johan Hegg's vocals complement the Iron Maiden-esque guitar riffing from Olavi Mikkonen and Johan Söderberg. Blabbermouth.net gave With Oden on Our Side a score of 8 out of 10 comparing its quality to that of Versus the World and Fate of Norns.

=== Accolades ===
Publication	Country	Accolade	Year	Rank
Loudwire	US	Top 100 Hard Rock + Metal Albums of the 21st Century	2016	63

== Track listing ==
All tracks are written by Amon Amarth.

No.	Title	Length
1.	"Valhall Awaits Me"	4:44
2.	"Runes to My Memory"	4:33
3.	"Asator"	3:04
4.	"Hermod's Ride to Hel - Lokes Treachery Part 1"	4:41
5.	"Gods of War Arise"	6:03
6.	"With Oden on Our Side"	4:35
7.	"Cry of the Black Birds"	3:50
8.	"Under the Northern Star"	4:17
9.	"Prediction of Warfare"	6:37
Total length:		42:17

Limited digipak edition bonus CD
No.	Title	Length
1.	"Where Silent Gods Stand Guard" (live)	6:11
2.	"Death in Fire" (live)	4:55
3.	"With Oden on Our Side" (demo)	4:32
4.	"Hermod's Ride to Hel - Lokes Treachery Part 1" (demo)	4:49
5.	"Once Sent from the Golden Hall" (Sunlight Recording)	4:03
6.	"Return of the Gods" (Sunlight Recording)	3:34
Total length:		28:04

== Credits ==
=== Personnel ===
==== Amon Amarth ====
- Johan Hegg − vocals
- Olavi Mikkonen − lead guitar
- Johan Söderberg − rhythm guitar
- Ted Lundström − bass
- Fredrik Andersson − drums

==== Production ====
- Jens Bogren – production, engineering, mixing
- Anders "Shadow" Ström – additional recording
- Thomas Eberger – mastering

=== Studios ===
- Fascination Street studios, Örebro, Sweden
- Cutting Room, Stockholm – mastering
- Amon Amarth's rehearsal studio – recording (2006 demos)
- Sunlight Studio – recording (1997 demos)

== Charts ==
Chart	Peak position
Austrian Albums (Ö3 Austria)	27
German Albums (Offizielle Top 100)	21
Swedish Albums (Sverigetopplistan)	21
