= The Great Heathen Army =

Studio album by Amon Amarth
- Released: 5 August 2022
- Studios: Backstage Productions, Derbyshire, England.
- Genre: Melodic death metal
- Length: 42:59
- Label: Metal Blade
- Producer: Andy Sneap

Amon Amarth chronology
Berserker (2019)	The Great Heathen Army (2022)	The Allfather Awakens (2026)

Singles from The Great Heathen Army
- 1. "Get in the Ring" Released: 2 June 2022

The Great Heathen Army is the twelfth studio album by Swedish melodic death metal band Amon Amarth. It was released on 5 August 2022, through Metal Blade Records.

== Critical reception ==
Professional ratings
Review scores
Source	Rating
AngryMetalGuy	2.5/5 stars
Blabbermouth.net	8.5/10
Kerrang!	4/5 stars
Metal Injection	8/10
Metal Storm	5.5/10
Sonic Perspectives	9/10
Sputnikmusic	3.3/5 stars

Dan Slessor of Kerrang! described the album as "a step back towards their melodic death metal origins, and it is definitely to their betterment, delivering perhaps the strongest collection since 2008's Twilight of the Thunder God".

Blabbermouth.net portrayed the album as "Both an unapologetic, festival-ready dose of new, gleaming, Viking-populated anthems, and one of the darkest and most brutal albums they have yet made".

== Track listing ==
All songs written by Amon Amarth, except additional lyrics on "Saxons and Vikings" by Biff Byford.

The Great Heathen Army track listing
No.	Title	Length
1.	"Get in the Ring"	4:24
2.	"The Great Heathen Army"	4:04
3.	"Heidrun"	4:42
4.	"Oden Owns You All"	4:17
5.	"Find a Way or Make One"	4:30
6.	"Dawn of Norsemen"	5:32
7.	"Saxons and Vikings" (featuring Saxon)	4:55
8.	"Skagul Rides with Me"	4:34
9.	"The Serpent's Trail"	6:01
Total length:		42:59

== Personnel ==
Amon Amarth

- Johan Hegg − vocals
- Olavi Mikkonen − lead guitar
- Johan Söderberg − rhythm guitar
- Ted Lundström − bass
- Jocke Wallgren − drums

Other personnel

- Biff Byford − vocals (track 7)
- Paul Quinn - guitars (track 7)
- Doug Scarratt - guitars (track 7)
- Andy Sneap − production, mixing, mastering

== Charts ==
=== Weekly charts ===
Weekly chart performance for The Great Heathen Army
Chart (2022)	Peak position
Australian Digital Albums (ARIA)	17
Austrian Albums (Ö3 Austria)	4
Belgian Albums (Ultratop Flanders)	36
Belgian Albums (Ultratop Wallonia)	56
Dutch Albums (Album Top 100)	32
Finnish Albums (Suomen virallinen lista)	7
French Albums (SNEP)	79
German Albums (Offizielle Top 100)	1
Polish Albums (ZPAV)	43
Swedish Albums (Sverigetopplistan)	20
Scottish Albums (Official Charts)	17
Spanish Albums (Promusicae)	77
Swiss Albums (Schweizer Hitparade)	3
UK Albums (Official Charts)	95
UK Independent Albums (Official Charts)	4
UK Rock & Metal Albums (Official Charts)	2

=== Year-end charts ===
Year-end chart performance for The Great Heathen Army
Chart (2022)	Position
German Albums (Offizielle Top 100)	86
