= The Avenger (album) =

Studio album by Amon Amarth
- Released: 2 September 1999
- Recorded: March 1999
- Studio: The Abyss
- Genre: Melodic death metal
- Length: 36:12
- Label: Metal Blade
- Producer: Peter Tägtgren

Amon Amarth chronology
Once Sent from the Golden Hall (1998)	The Avenger (1999)	The Crusher (2001)

Professional ratings
Review scores
Source	Rating
AllMusic	3.5/5 stars

The Avenger is the second studio album by Swedish melodic death metal band Amon Amarth, released by Metal Blade Records on 2 September 1999. It was the first Amon Amarth album with guitarist Johan Söderberg and drummer Fredrik Andersson, thus completing the line-up that remained up until 2015, when Andersson left the band. It was also released as a digipak version, containing a bonus track "Thor Arise", a re-recording of the title track from their first demo, Thor Arise. The album was also released as an LP version. Later, Metal Blade Records re-released the album in 2005 on Picture LP, limited to 500 hand-counted copies. A deluxe edition was released in 2009 that featured the album remastered by Jens Bogren, and a bonus cd of the original album played live in its entirety in Bochum, Germany.

== Quote and feud ==
Exact quote for the album, by the band:

Any references made to implicate that there are cover bands out there that really sucks [sic] found in this recording are purely intentional.

The quote was a result of a short-lived feud with heavy metal band HammerFall, and fears consumers and press alike viewed the album as unoriginal or a near-cover work of another band.

== Track listing ==
All lyrics are written by Johan Hegg.

No.	Title	Music	Length
1.	"Bleed for Ancient Gods"	Olavi Mikkonen	4:31
2.	"The Last with Pagan Blood"	Mikkonen	5:39
3.	"North Sea Storm"	Mikkonen	4:56
4.	"Avenger"	Mikkonen	7:11
5.	"God, His Son and Holy Whore"	Mikkonen; Martin Lopez	4:00
6.	"Metalwrath"	Mikkonen	3:50
7.	"Legend of a Banished Man"	Mikkonen	6:05
Total length:			36:12

Limited digipak edition bonus track
No.	Title	Length
8.	"Thor Arise" (re-recording from Thor Arise demo)	5:07
Total length:		41:19

2009 remastered edition bonus CD
No.	Title	Length
1.	"Bleed for Ancient Gods" (live in Bochum, Germany in 2008)	4:29
2.	"The Last with Pagan Blood" (live in Bochum, Germany in 2008)	5:00
3.	"North Sea Storm" (live in Bochum, Germany in 2008)	5:12
4.	"Avenger" (live in Bochum, Germany in 2008)	7:15
5.	"God, His Son and Holy Whore" (live in Bochum, Germany in 2008)	4:09
6.	"Metalwrath" (live in Bochum, Germany in 2008)	3:57
7.	"Legend of a Banished Man" (live in Bochum, Germany in 2008)	6:03
Total length:		36:05

== Personnel ==
=== Amon Amarth ===
- Johan Hegg − vocals
- Olavi Mikkonen − lead guitar
- Johan Söderberg − rhythm guitar
- Ted Lundström − bass
- Fredrik Andersson − drums

=== Other ===
- Engineered and mixed by Peter Tägtgren.
- Mastered at Cutting Room in Stockholm by Peter In De Betou, April 1999.
- Cover and layout by Thomas Everhard.
