= Sorrow Throughout the Nine Worlds =

EP by Amon Amarth
- Released: 5 April 1996
- Recorded: November 1995 at The Abyss
- Genre: Melodic death metal
- Length: 24:39
- Label: Pulverised

Amon Amarth chronology
Sorrow Throughout the Nine Worlds (1996)	Once Sent from the Golden Hall (1998)

Sorrow Throughout the Nine Worlds is an early EP by Swedish melodic death metal band Amon Amarth, released in 1996 by Pulverised Records. A small-run album pre-dating the band's move to Metal Blade Records, it was distributed as a mini CD, and is also referred to as a demo.

It was originally released as a digipak limited to 1500 copies and later re-pressed as a normal MCD in two different versions of 1500 and 1000 copies. The MCD was re-issued in 2000, digitally remastered in a press of 2000 copies. It was also released as a limited picture disc by Metal Supremacy Records with 500 copies in 2001. The entire EP was eventually re-released in the "Viking edition" of Versus the World.

== Track listing ==
All tracks are written by Amon Amarth.

No.	Title	Length
1.	"Sorrow Throughout the Nine Worlds"	3:50
2.	"The Arrival of the Fimbul Winter"	4:26
3.	"Burning Creation"	5:03
4.	"The Mighty Doors of the Speargod's Hall"	5:42
5.	"Under the Grayclouded Winter Sky"	5:38
Total length:		24:39

== Credits ==
=== Band members ===
- Johan Hegg – vocals
- Olavi Mikkonen – lead guitar
- Anders Hannson – rhythm guitar
- Ted Lundström – bass
- Niko Kaukinen – drums

=== Other ===
- Mixed and engineered by Peter Tägtgren
- Cover by Amon Amarth
- Layout by Honvie
