= Jomsviking (album) =

Studio album by Amon Amarth
- Released: 25 March 2016
- Studios: Backstage Productions, Derbyshire, England
- Genre: Melodic death metal
- Length: 52:08
- Label: Metal Blade
- Producer: Andy Sneap

Amon Amarth chronology
Deceiver of the Gods (2013)	Jomsviking (2016)	Berserker (2019)

Singles from Jomsviking
- 1. "First Kill" Released: 25 January 2016; 2. "At Dawn's First Light" Released: 15 March 2016

Jomsviking is the tenth studio album by Swedish melodic death metal band Amon Amarth. It was mixed and produced by Andy Sneap and released on 25 March 2016 through Metal Blade Records.

== Background ==
This is the band's first concept album. Vocalist Johan Hegg described the concept of the album:

The Jomsvikings and their world is the background for the story of a young man that is in love with a girl but unfortunately she's being married off. He accidentally kills a man when this happens and he has to flee — but he swears to have revenge and win her back. He can't let go of the past. He feels that he's been wronged and his life has been destroyed. The way the story evolves is not a happy story.

— Johan Hegg, Blabbermouth

== Critical reception ==
Professional ratings
Aggregate scores
Source	Rating
Metacritic	79/100
Review scores
Source	Rating
About.com	3.5/5 stars
AllMusic	4/5 stars
Exclaim!	7/10
Metal Hammer	3.5/5 stars
PopMatters	7/10 stars
Sputnikmusic	4/5
AntiHero Magazine	3/5 stars
Metal Injection	9/10

Writing for Exclaim!, Renee Trotier wrote that "while longtime fans might be a bit thrown off by some of the more melodic traditional metal elements throughout Jomsviking, the music is well suited to both the concept's narrative and a natural evolution of Amon Amarth's more well known style."

The album was certified Gold in Germany.

== Track listing ==
All tracks are written by Amon Amarth.

No.	Title	Length
1.	"First Kill"	4:21
2.	"Wanderer"	4:42
3.	"On a Sea of Blood"	4:04
4.	"One Against All"	3:37
5.	"Raise Your Horns"	4:23
6.	"The Way of Vikings"	5:11
7.	"At Dawn's First Light"	3:50
8.	"One Thousand Burning Arrows"	5:49
9.	"Vengeance Is My Name" (digibook edition bonus track)	4:41
10.	"A Dream That Cannot Be" (featuring Doro Pesch)	4:22
11.	"Back on Northern Shores"	7:08
Total length:		52:08

Japanese edition bonus tracks
No.	Title	Length
12.	"Death in Fire 2016"	4:55
13.	"Death in Fire" (live)	5:05
Total length:		62:08

== Credits ==
Writing, performance and production credits are adapted from the album liner notes.

=== Personnel ===
==== Amon Amarth ====
- Johan Hegg − vocals
- Olavi Mikkonen − lead guitar
- Johan Söderberg − rhythm guitar
- Ted Lundström − bass

==== Session musicians ====
- Tobias Gustafsson − drums

==== Guest musicians ====
- Doro Pesch − clean female vocals on "A Dream That Cannot Be"

==== Production ====
- Andy Sneap – production, recording, mixing

==== Visual art ====
- Tom Thiel − cover art
- Thomas Ewerhard − layout
- Niclas Mortensen – additional artwork
- John Lorenzi – additional artwork
- Sam Didier – additional artwork
- Christian Sloan Hall – additional artwork
- Adi Kalingga – additional artwork
- Thomas Ewerhard – additional artwork
- Garip Jensen − photos, digital editing

=== Studios ===
- Backstage Productions, Derbyshire – recording, mixing

== Charts ==
=== Weekly charts ===
Chart (2016)	Peak position
Australian Albums (ARIA)	15
Austrian Albums (Ö3 Austria)	1
Belgian Albums (Ultratop Flanders)	18
Belgian Albums (Ultratop Wallonia)	29
Canadian Albums (Billboard)	8
Dutch Albums (Album Top 100)	35
Finnish Albums (Suomen virallinen lista)	4
French Albums (SNEP)	34
German Albums (Offizielle Top 100)	1
Hungarian Albums (MAHASZ)	25
Norwegian Albums (VG-lista)	22
Scottish Albums (Official Charts)	18
Spanish Albums (Promusicae)	64
Swedish Albums (Sverigetopplistan)	5
Swiss Albums (Schweizer Hitparade)	3
UK Albums (Official Charts)	30
UK Album Downloads (Official Charts)	42
UK Rock & Metal Albums (Official Charts)	2
US Billboard 200	19
US Top Rock Albums (Billboard)	4

=== Year-end charts ===
Chart (2016)	Position
German Albums (Offizielle Top 100)	82

== Certifications ==
Region	Certification	Certified units/sales
Germany (BVMI)	Gold	100,000^{‡}
^{‡} Sales+streaming figures based on certification alone.
