= Deceiver of the Gods =

Studio album by Amon Amarth
- Released: 25 June 2013
- Studio: Backstage Productions, Derbyshire, England
- Genre: Melodic death metal
- Length: 47:52
- Label: Metal Blade
- Producer: Andy Sneap

Amon Amarth chronology
Surtur Rising (2011)	Deceiver of the Gods (2013)	Jomsviking (2016)

Deceiver of the Gods is the ninth studio album by Swedish melodic death metal band Amon Amarth. It was released in Sweden and Finland on 19 June 2013, and in the US on 25 June 2013 through Metal Blade Records. Former Candlemass singer Messiah Marcolin makes a guest appearance on the track "Hel".

The title of the album and its artwork were revealed on 12 April 2013, and the title song was released on the band's homepage a day later, available for streaming or as a free download. A video for the song was released in September 2014.

In Canada, the album debuted at number 9 on the Canadian Albums Chart. This was the band's last album with longtime drummer Fredrik Andersson before he left the band in March 2015.

== Reception ==
Professional ratings
Aggregate scores
Source	Rating
Metacritic	67/100
Review scores
Source	Rating
About.com	2.5/5 stars
AllMusic	4/5 stars
Decibel Magazine	9/10 stars
Exclaim!	8/10
The Guardian	4/5 stars
Pitchfork	5.6/10
Revolver	4/5 stars

According to Metacritic, the album received "generally favorable reviews based on 7 critics", with an aggregate score of 67 out of 100. Allmusic praised the album for balancing "unyielding blasts of Viking brutality" with "artful melodies" while Exclaim.ca similarly awarded a favorable score for the band's mixture of "soaring melodies" with the "raw precision" of the rhythms. However, Pitchfork criticized the album as formulaic and uninspired while About.com described the album as a "letdown" due to Amon Amarth's "playing it safe" approach. This view was contrary to that expressed in Decibel Magazine, where the album was praised for duelling guitars invoking Thin Lizzy, Iron Maiden, and Judas Priest while the "expertly woven ebb and flow of tempo and style" caused the album to go "from rampaging to brooding to anthemic over a well-conceived trajectory." Tony Vilgotsky of Russian magazine Mir Fantastiki have rated this album with 7 of 10, saying that Deceiver of the Gods slightly doesn't reach the level of previous Amon Amarth's work, Surtur Rising, but this doesn't spoil the overall impression of the record.

== Track listing ==
All tracks are written by Amon Amarth.

No.	Title	Length
1.	"Deceiver of the Gods"	4:19
2.	"As Loke Falls"	4:38
3.	"Father of the Wolf"	4:19
4.	"Shape Shifter"	4:02
5.	"Under Siege"	6:17
6.	"Blood Eagle"	3:15
7.	"We Shall Destroy"	4:25
8.	"Hel" (featuring Messiah Marcolin of ex-Candlemass)	4:09
9.	"Coming of the Tide"	4:16
10.	"Warriors of the North"	8:12
Total length:		47:52

Under the Influence - Limited digipak edition bonus CD
No.	Title	Length
1.	"Burning Anvil of Steel" (Style Parody of Judas Priest)	4:27
2.	"Satan Rising" (Style Parody of Black Sabbath)	4:20
3.	"Snake Eyes" (Style Parody of Motörhead)	3:13
4.	"Stand Up to Go Down" (Style Parody of AC/DC)	3:27
Total length:		15:27

Japanese edition bonus tracks
No.	Title	Length
11.	"Masters of War" (live)	5:10
12.	"Ride for Vengeance" (live)	4:37
13.	"Versus the World" (live)	5:57
Total length:		63:36

== Personnel ==
Amon Amarth

- Johan Hegg − vocals
- Olavi Mikkonen − lead guitar
- Johan Söderberg − rhythm guitar
- Ted Lundström − bass
- Fredrik Andersson − drums

Additional musicians

- Messiah Marcolin − guest vocals on "Hel"

Production

- Andy Sneap − production, mixing, mastering
- Tom Thiel − artwork

== Charts ==
Chart (2013)	Peak position
Austrian Albums (Ö3 Austria)	7
Belgian Albums (Ultratop Flanders)	48
Belgian Albums (Ultratop Wallonia)	44
Canadian Albums (Billboard)	9
Danish Albums (Hitlisten)	27
Finnish Albums (Suomen virallinen lista)	12
French Albums (SNEP)	67
German Albums (Offizielle Top 100)	3
Hungarian Albums (MAHASZ)	15
Japanese Albums (Oricon)	156
Norwegian Albums (VG-lista)	37
Scottish Albums (OCC)	70
Swedish Albums (Sverigetopplistan)	9
Swiss Albums (Schweizer Hitparade)	9
UK Albums (OCC)	67
UK Independent Albums (OCC)	14
UK Rock & Metal Albums (OCC)	4
US Billboard 200	19
US Independent Albums (Billboard)	4
US Top Hard Rock Albums (Billboard)	4
US Top Rock Albums (Billboard)	5
US Top Tastemaker Albums (Billboard)	2
