= The Crusher (album) =

Studio album by Amon Amarth
- Released: 8 May 2001
- Recorded: November 2000
- Studio: The Abyss
- Genre: Melodic death metal
- Length: 45:59
- Label: Metal Blade
- Producer: Peter Tägtgren, Amon Amarth

Amon Amarth chronology
The Avenger (1999)	The Crusher (2001)	Versus the World (2002)

Reissue
- The cover to the deluxe reissue edition (2009)

Professional ratings
Review scores
Source	Rating
About.com	4/5 stars
AllMusic	3.5/5 stars

The Crusher is the third studio album by Swedish melodic death metal band Amon Amarth. It was released on 8 May 2001, through Metal Blade Records. The album was also released on the Double LP and Picture LP versions on 29 June 2007, which were hand-counted and limited to only 500 copies. A deluxe edition was released in 2009 that featured the album remastered by Jens Bogren, and a bonus CD of the original album played live in its entirety in Bochum, Germany.

== Track listing ==
All lyrics are written by Johan Hegg.

No.	Title	Music	Length
1.	"Bastards of a Lying Breed"	Olavi Mikkonen	5:33
2.	"Masters of War"	Mikkonen; Fredrik Andersson	4:35
3.	"The Sound of Eight Hooves"	Mikkonen	4:50
4.	"Risen from the Sea (2000)"	Mikkonen; Ted Lundström; Nico Kaukinen; Anders Hansson	4:26
5.	"As Long as the Raven Flies"	Mikkonen	4:04
6.	"A Fury Divine"	Mikkonen	6:36
7.	"Annihilation of Hammerfest"	Mikkonen; Johan Söderberg	5:03
8.	"The Fall Through Ginnungagap"	Mikkonen	5:21
9.	"Releasing Surtur's Fire"	Mikkonen	5:30
Total length:			45:59

Limited edition bonus track
No.	Title	Length
10.	"Eyes of Horror" (Possessed cover)	3:34
Total length:		49:33

2009 remastered edition bonus CD
No.	Title	Length
1.	"Bastards of a Lying Breed" (live in Bochum, Germany in 2008)	5:41
2.	"Masters of War" (live in Bochum, Germany in 2008)	5:10
3.	"The Sound of Eight Hooves" (live in Bochum, Germany in 2008)	5:02
4.	"Risen from the Sea (2000)" (live in Bochum, Germany in 2008)	4:24
5.	"As Long as the Raven Flies" (live in Bochum, Germany in 2008)	3:36
6.	"A Fury Divine" (live in Bochum, Germany in 2008)	6:09
7.	"Annihilation of Hammerfest" (live in Bochum, Germany in 2008)	5:14
8.	"The Fall Through Ginnungagap" (live in Bochum, Germany in 2008)	5:40
9.	"Releasing Surtur's Fire" (live in Bochum, Germany in 2008)	5:17
Total length:		46:13

== Personnel ==
=== Band members ===
- Johan Hegg – vocals
- Olavi Mikkonen – lead guitar
- Johan Söderberg – rhythm guitar
- Ted Lundström – bass
- Fredrik Andersson – drums

=== Other ===
- Engineered by Lars Szöke and mixed by Peter Tägtgren
- Mastered at Cuttingroom by Peter In the Betou
- Bonus track "Eyes of Horror" recorded at Das Boot studio
- Cover by Tom Thiel and Thomas Everhard
- Layout by Thomas Everhard

== Release history ==
Date	Release
8 May 2001	Original
29 August 2009	Reissue
