= Amon Amarth =

Swedish melodic death metal band

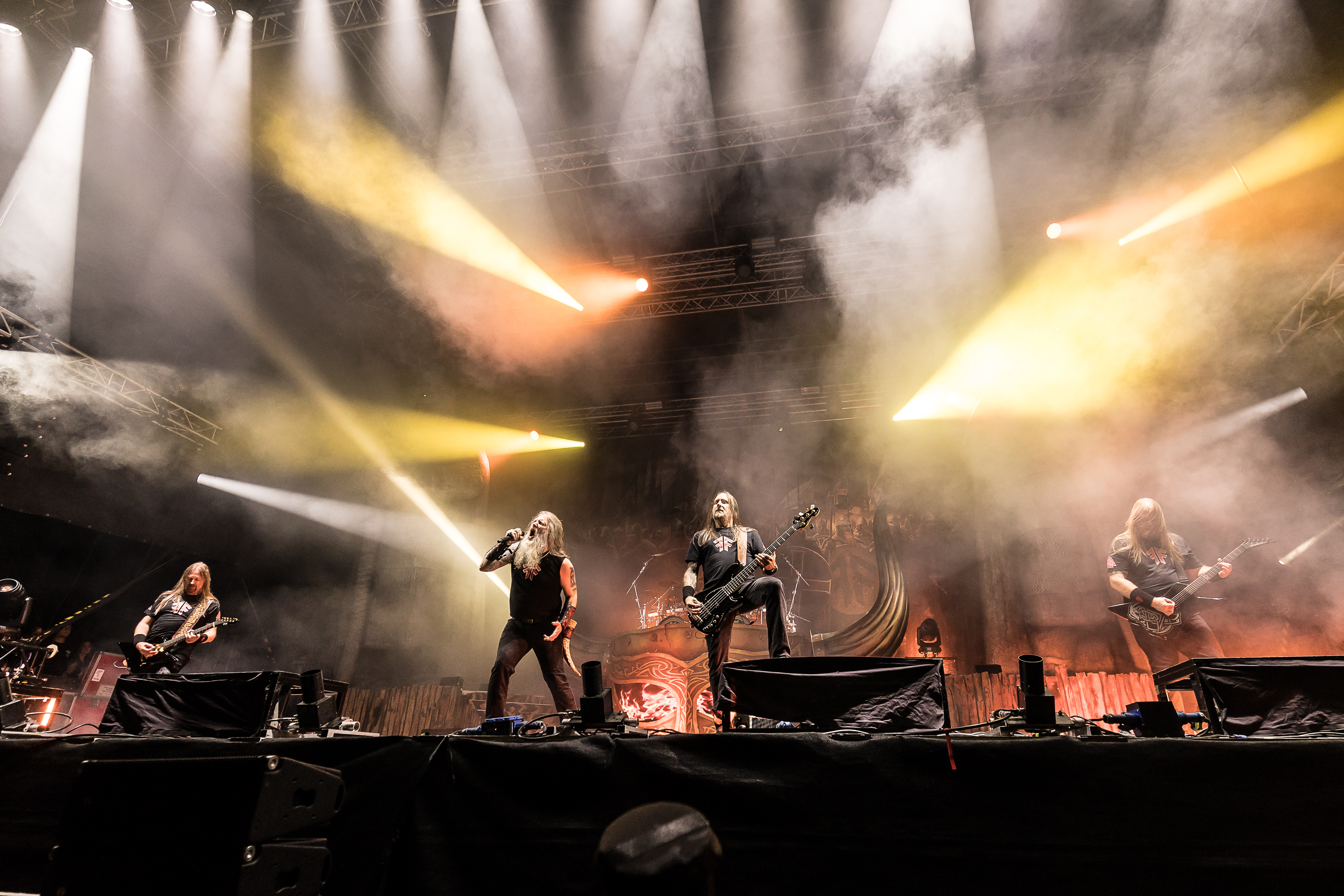
- Amon Amarth live at Full Rewind 2024

Background information
- Origin: Tumba, Sweden
- Genre: Melodic death metal
- Years active: 1992–present
- Labels: Metal Blade; Sony Music
- Members: Olavi Mikkonen; Johan Hegg; Ted Lundström; Johan Söderberg; Jocke Wallgren
- Past members: Niko Kaukinen; Anders Hansson; Martin Lopez; Fredrik Andersson
- Website: amonamarth.com

Amon Amarth (/əˈmɒn əˈmɑːrθ/) are a Swedish melodic death metal band from Tumba, formed in 1992. The band takes their name from the Sindarin name of Mount Doom, a volcano in J. R. R. Tolkien's Middle-earth. Their lyrics mostly revolve around Viking mythology and history, and so they are sometimes labelled "Viking metal", though they are musically melodic death metal, a term the band prefers. Amon Amarth is composed of lead guitarist Olavi Mikkonen, vocalist Johan Hegg, bassist Ted Lundström, rhythm guitarist Johan Söderberg, and drummer Jocke Wallgren.

The band has released 13 studio albums, one compilation album, one EP, one video album, and ten music videos. Their debut album, Once Sent from the Golden Hall, was released in 1998. Five more studio releases followed. The band had its breakthrough with the 2008 album Twilight of the Thunder God, which debuted at No. 10 on the Swedish album charts and No. 50 on the US Billboard 200. Six more albums, Surtur Rising, Deceiver of the Gods, Jomsviking, Berserker, The Great Heathen Army, and The Allfather Awakens, followed in 2011, 2013, 2016, 2019, 2022, and 2026 respectively.

== History ==
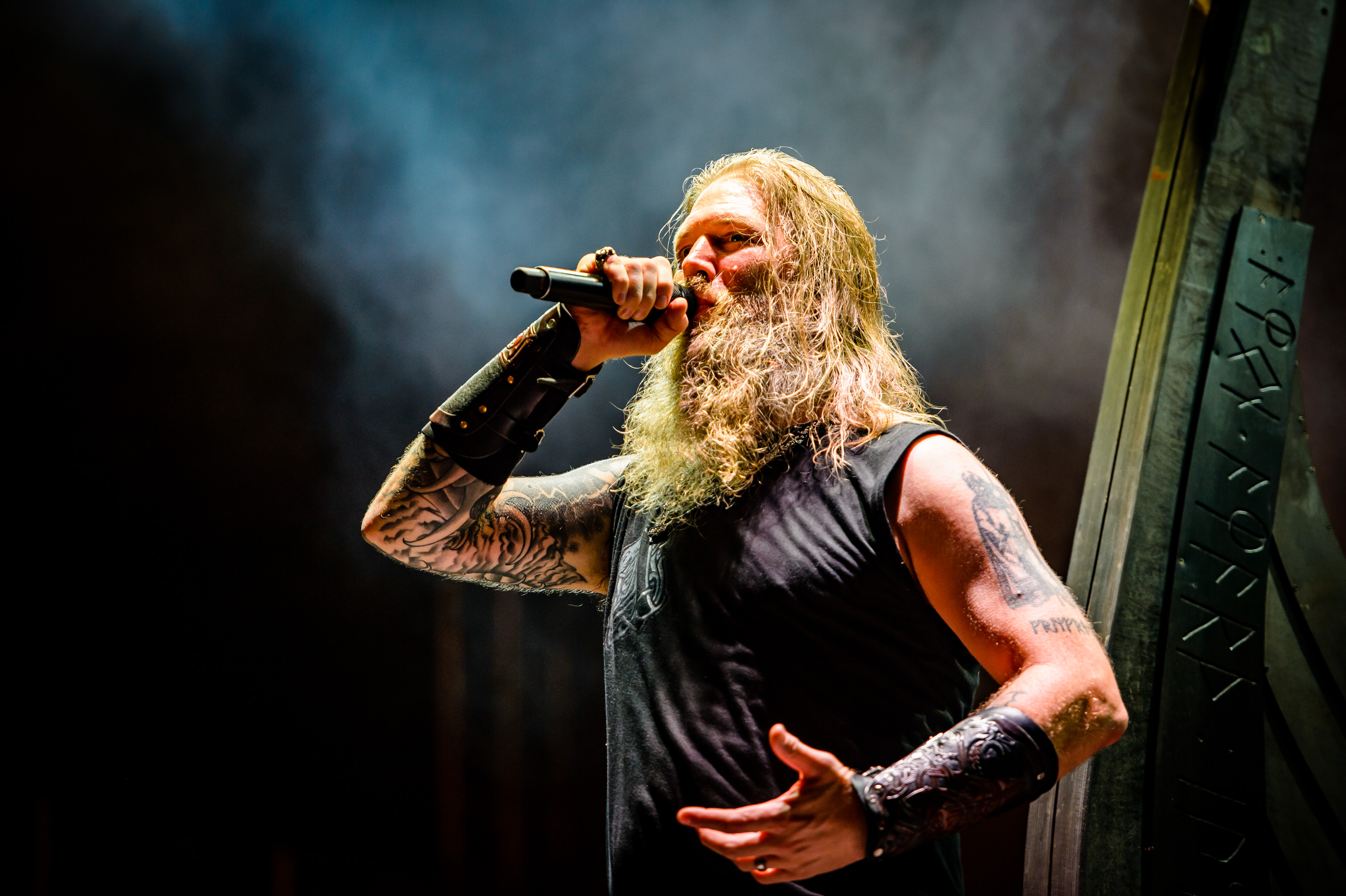
Johan Hegg in 2017

=== Formation (1988–1991) ===
The band emerged from the previous grindcore (or death metal) band Scum, founded in 1988 by Paul "Themgoroth" Mäkitalo (Dark Funeral) on vocals, Olavi Mikkonen on lead guitar, Petri Tarvainen on bass and Vesa Meriläinen played on rhythm guitar.

=== Early recordings (1992–1997) ===
After a 1991 demo, Scum broke up and Amon Amarth formed in 1992. Hegg replaced Mäkitalo on vocals, Anders Hansson replaced Meriläinen on rhythm guitar, and Ted Lundström replaced Tarvainen on bass, before recording its first demo, Thor Arise, in 1993. Raw and uneven in sound and execution, it was never officially released due to low quality standards, but the band caught the attention of extreme metal fans with its "infectious brand of epic-sounding brutality and unadorned conviction". In 1994, another demo, The Arrival of the Fimbul Winter, was recorded. 1,000 copies were issued.

In 1996, they signed with Pulverised Records, on which they released their first MCD, Sorrow Throughout the Nine Worlds, which sold 6,000 copies.

=== Signed with Metal Blade (1998–2007) ===
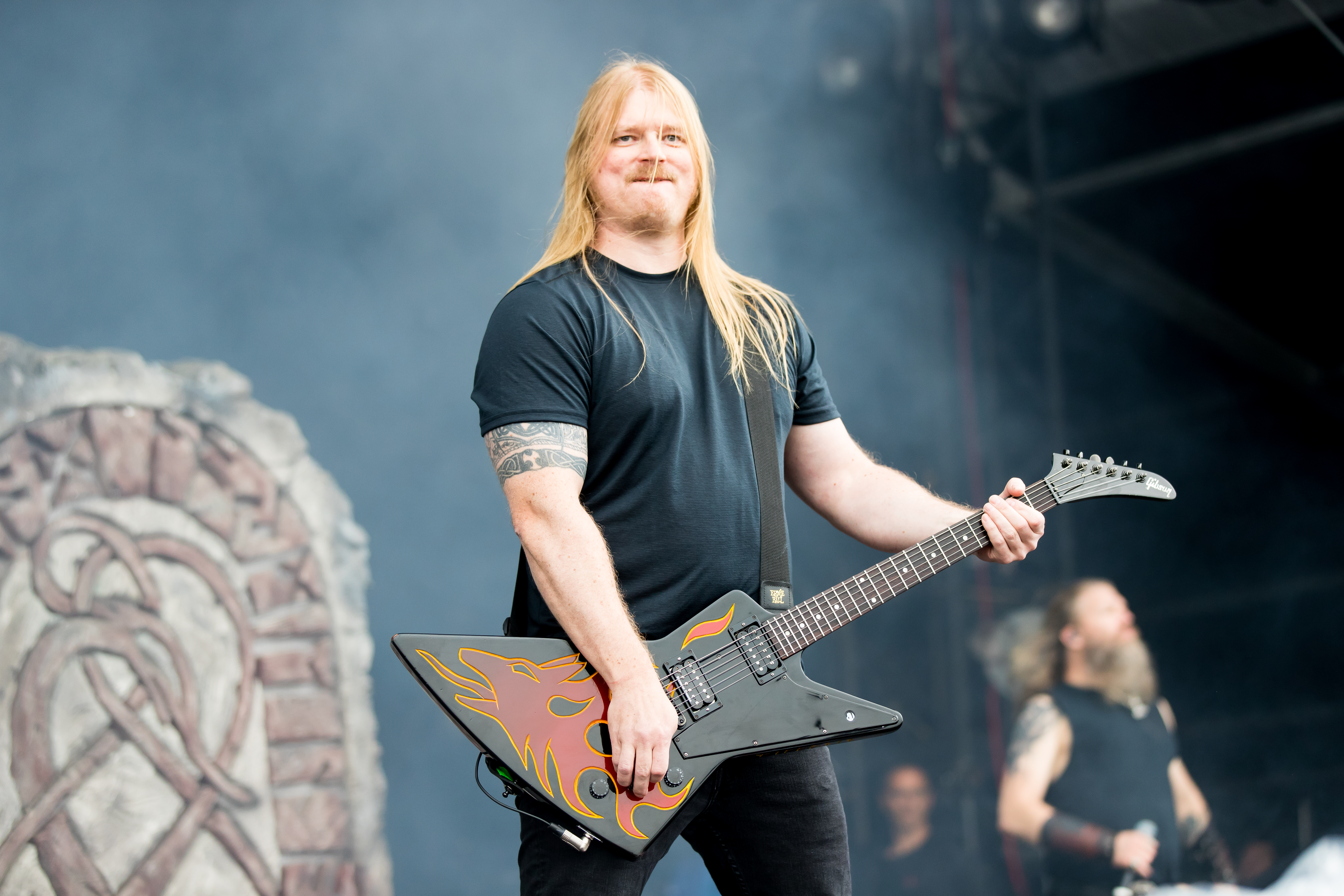
Olavi Mikkonen in 2016

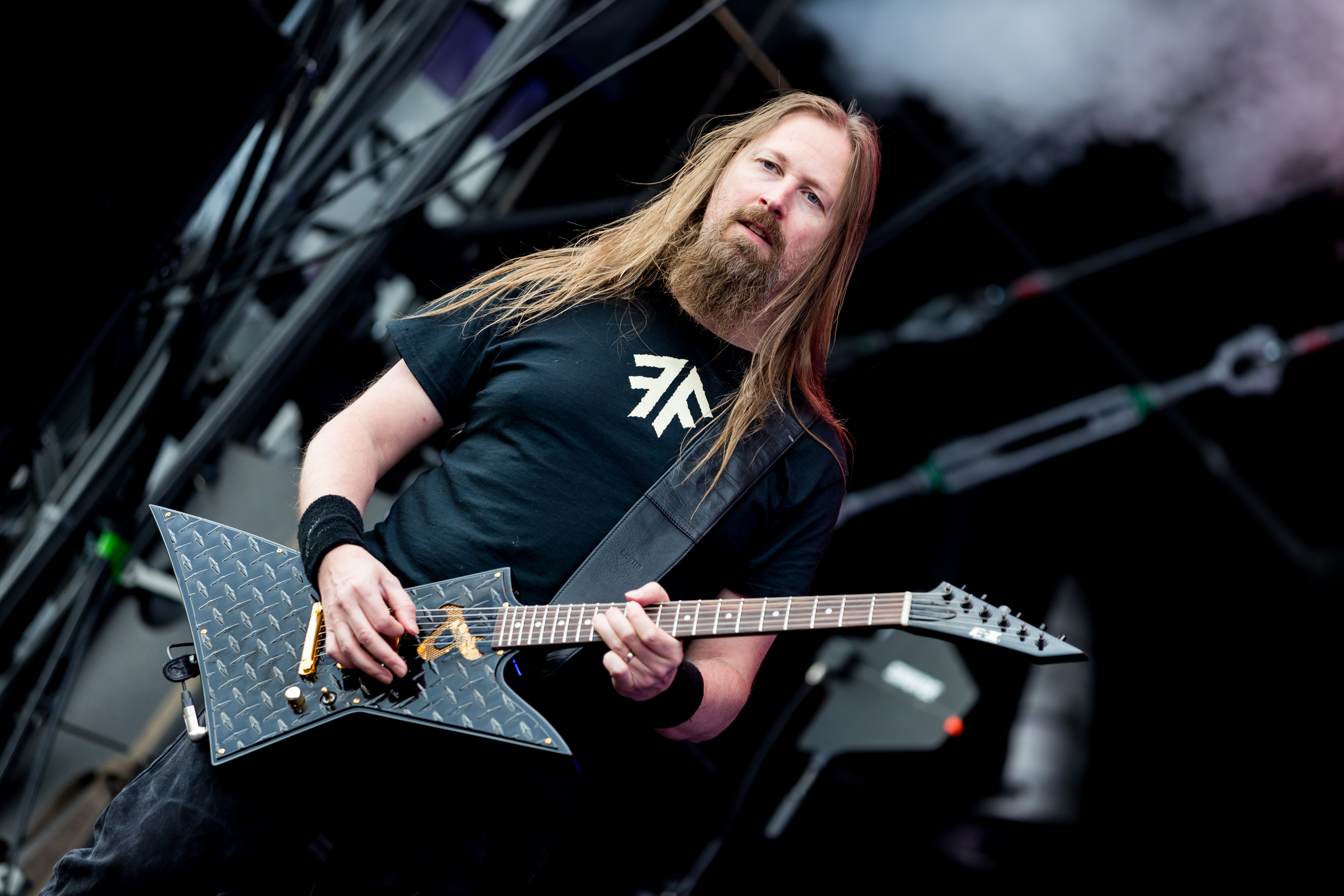
Johan Söderberg in 2019

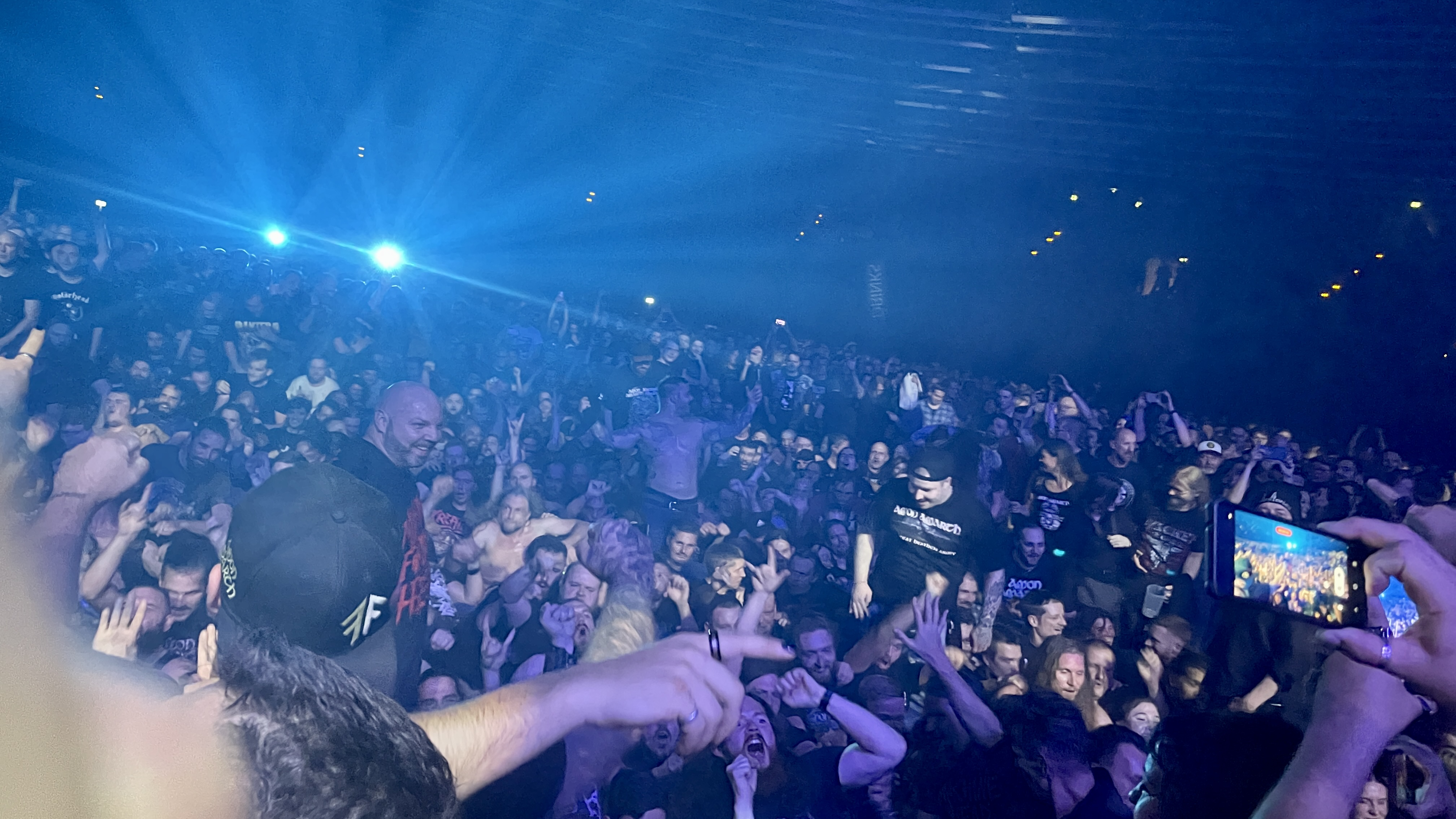
Fans doing a rowingboatshow

They signed with Metal Blade Records, releasing the debut album Once Sent from the Golden Hall. Described as "a compelling fusion of buzzsaw riff work, melodic harmonies and soul-crushing rhythms punctuated by Hegg's callous black/death roar and accounts of Norse battles and treachery," it made Amon Amarth popular internationally. According to AllMusic, the song that bore the group's namesake was the most memorable, containing "the chaotic noises of battle, the screams of the dying, and much sword-clashing to boot." Since then, they have performed at multiple Canada and US tours, festival appearances, eight music videos, and appearances in over 100 metal magazines.

In June 1998, as the band was about to begin a tour with Deicide, Six Feet Under and Brutal Truth, guitarist Anders Hansson left and was replaced with Johan Soderberg. After the tour, Martin Lopez quit to join Opeth and Fredrik Andersson (ex-A Canorous Quintet) came in. With him, the band recorded and released their second full-length album, The Avenger, in 1999. The release was supported by the X-Mas Massacre Festivals Tour with Morbid Angel headlining. The band performed at Wacken Open Air in August of 1999.

The Crusher, released in 2001, was considered the group's most aggressive album. The band toured with Marduk and Vader to support it, taking part in No Mercy Festival. Their first American tour, scheduled for Autumn 2001, was cancelled due to the attacks of September 11th and was held later in January 2002. In April 2002, the band toured Europe with Vomitory, and in August performed at Wacken Open Air before a crowd of 12,000. Versus The World was released, alongside The Viking Edition, which contained a bonus CD with demos Thor Arise and Arrival Of The Fimbul Winter. Touring continued until spring 2004, when the band started working on Fate of Norns, released on 6 September 2004. The follow-up, With Oden on Our Side, was released in 2006, and showed, (according to AllMusic) that "Amon Amarth continue to be champions of the worldwide death metal tournament" and rose to #26 in the US Top Independent album charts. The album's material was not included in the DVD Wrath Of The Norsemen, released in May 2006. The band performed at Wacken Open Air in August of that year.

In early January 2008, the band's first tour of Australia and New Zealand took place, supporting Dimmu Borgir, after finishing a US and Canadian tour with Sonic Syndicate and Himsa.

=== Renewed contract with Metal Blade (2008–2014) ===
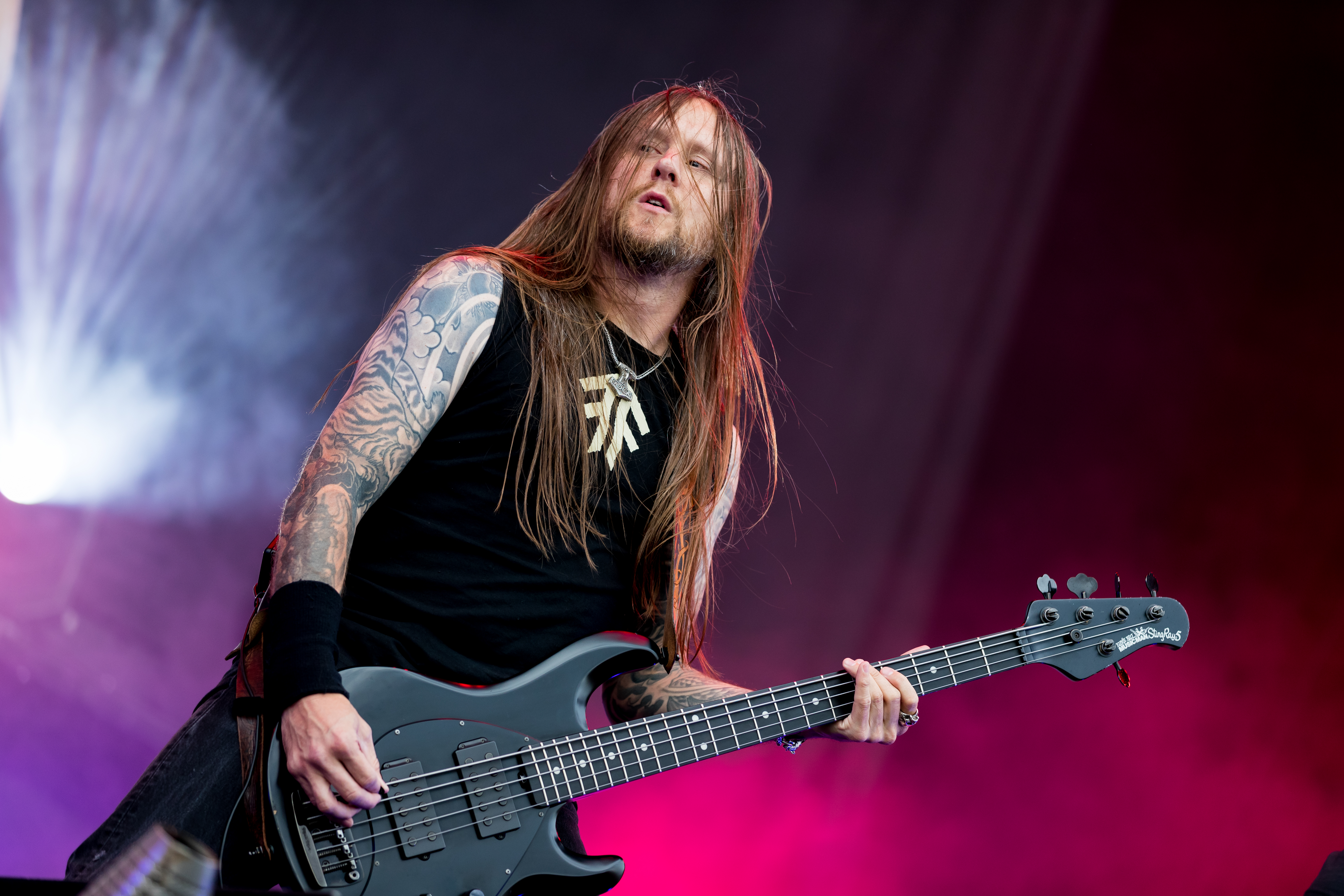
Ted Lundström in 2019

Amon Amarth extended its record deal with Metal Blade Records for three more albums. The band released Twilight of the Thunder God, which featured guest appearances by Lars-Göran Petrov of Entombed, Roope Latvala of Children of Bodom, and the cello metal band Apocalyptica. An eight-page comic strip based on Norse mythology that was released by magazines in Europe accompanied the release of the album. The album reached #50 in the U.S., #6 in Germany, #10 in Finland, #11 in Sweden, #14 in Austria, and #21 in Switzerland. It ended up at the #7 position in Revolver Magazine's Top 20 Albums that year.

Amon Amarth embarked on a North American headlining tour in October 2008, with support from Ensiferum, Belphegor, and The Absence. In 2009, the band returned to the U.S. for another series of dates with Goatwhore, Skeletonwitch and Lazarus A.D. and later in 2010 with Holy Grail and Eluveitie. In between, Amon Amarth were named "Best Breakthrough Act" at Metal Hammer's Golden Gods Awards. The band also supported Slayer in its Unholy Alliance Chapter III European tour. Amon Amarth played its first show in India, headlining the Deccan Rock Festival in Bangalore on 5 December 2009.

On 30 November 2010, Amon Amarth confirmed its next album, Surtur Rising, would be released in spring 2011. The drums were recorded at Park Studios, while bass and guitars were recorded at Fascination Street Studios. On 27 January 2011, Metal Blade Records released the new album's first single, "War of the Gods", on YouTube. On 29 March 2011, Surtur Rising was released in North America. To support the album, the band embarked on a 4-month world tour with Children Of Bodom and Ensiferum, among others.

Amon Amarth performed at Wacken Open Air in 2012, Hellfest 2013, Download Festival 2013, Sweden Rock Festival, and Mayhem Festival 2013.

On 25 June 2013, Amon Amarth released its ninth studio album, Deceiver of the Gods. The album cover, according to the band, depicted Ragnarök, the last battle between the Æsir gods and Loki, accompanied by the army of the dead.

In 2014, Hegg co-founded Grimfrost, a company that produces and sells reproductions of Viking Age artefacts, as well as products inspired by Viking Age culture.

=== Departure of Fredrik Andersson and Jomsviking (2015–2017) ===
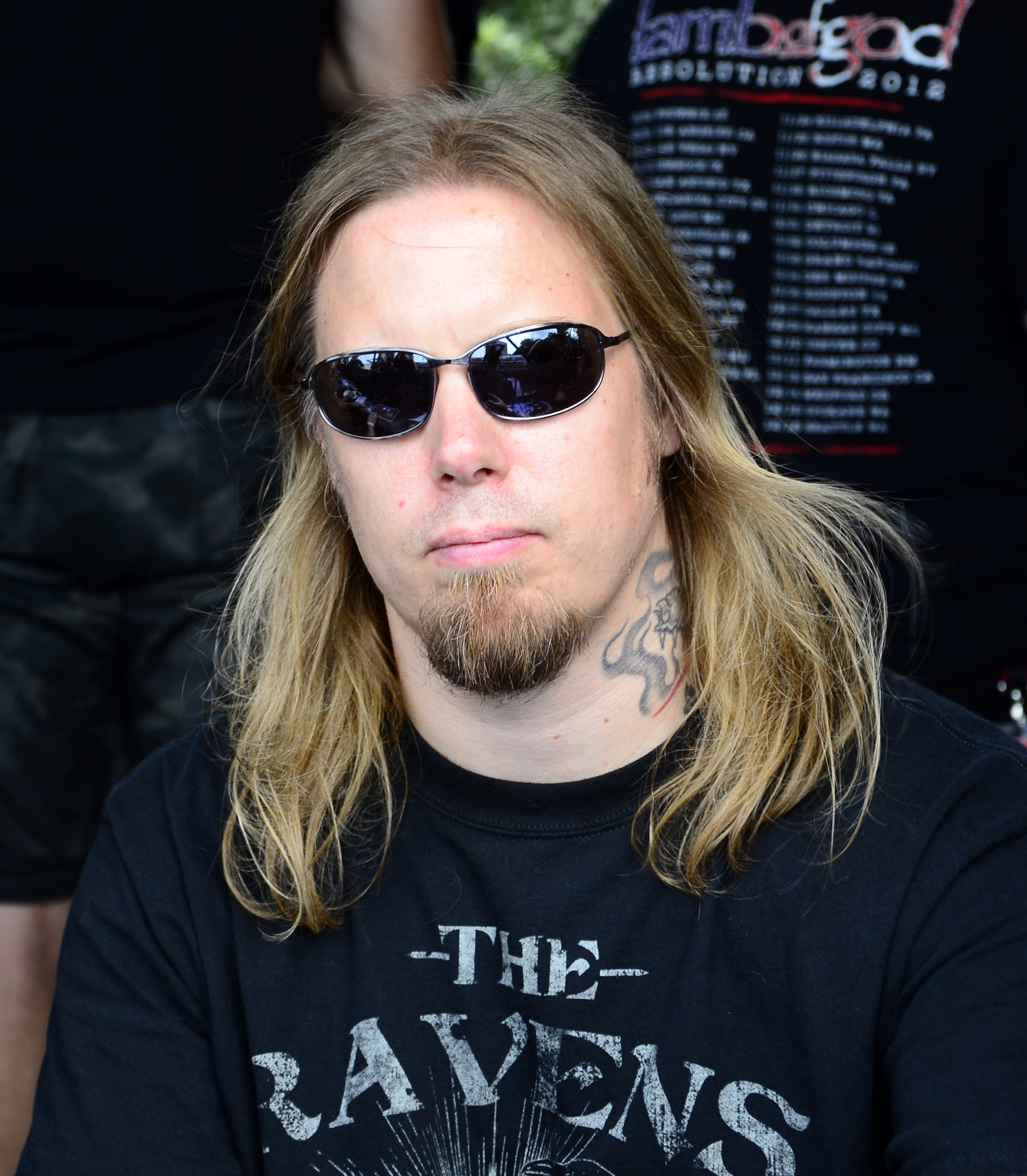
Fredrik Andersson

On 19 March 2015, Amon Amarth posted on its Facebook page that it had parted ways with drummer Fredrik Andersson after 17 years of collaboration. Andersson would later release a statement saying that he was "forced out" of the band and that his departure reasons revolved around the distribution of music royalties. He would later release an apology, explaining that his upset was caused by an assumption that he'd keep receiving residuals even after leaving the band.

The band released its 10th album, Jomsviking, on 25 March 2016. Session drummer Tobias Gustafsson (formerly of Vomitory) was recruited to complete the album.

From 22 to 25 March, the band performed four intimate album release shows in London, Paris, Tilburg, and Berlin to mark the release of Jomsviking. They supported Megadeth, Suicidal Tendencies and Metal Church on the Dystopia tour in the United States in September and October 2016, and headlined a tour in the UK and Ireland with Testament as special guests.

On 30 September 2016, Amon Amarth announced Jocke Wallgren as their full-time drummer. The band toured North America in May 2017 with support from Goatwhore.

In an August 2017 interview at Bloodstock Open Air festival, guitarist Johan Söderberg stated that Amon Amarth would begin working on their eleventh studio album after the Jomsviking tour. He was quoted as saying, "After this summer, we're done touring with this album. That's when we're gonna start to write stuff for the next one." The band performed at Wacken Open Air that summer.

In October 2017, Johan Hegg joined the DJ roster for Gimme Radio, promoting his involvement with Amon Amarth as well as his favorite music and playlists on the show, "Hammer of the North."

In November 2017, Ride & Crash Games partnered with Amon Amarth to release a self-titled video game centered around the band's songs and lyrics. It is currently available on iOS and Android.

=== Berserker (2018–2022) ===
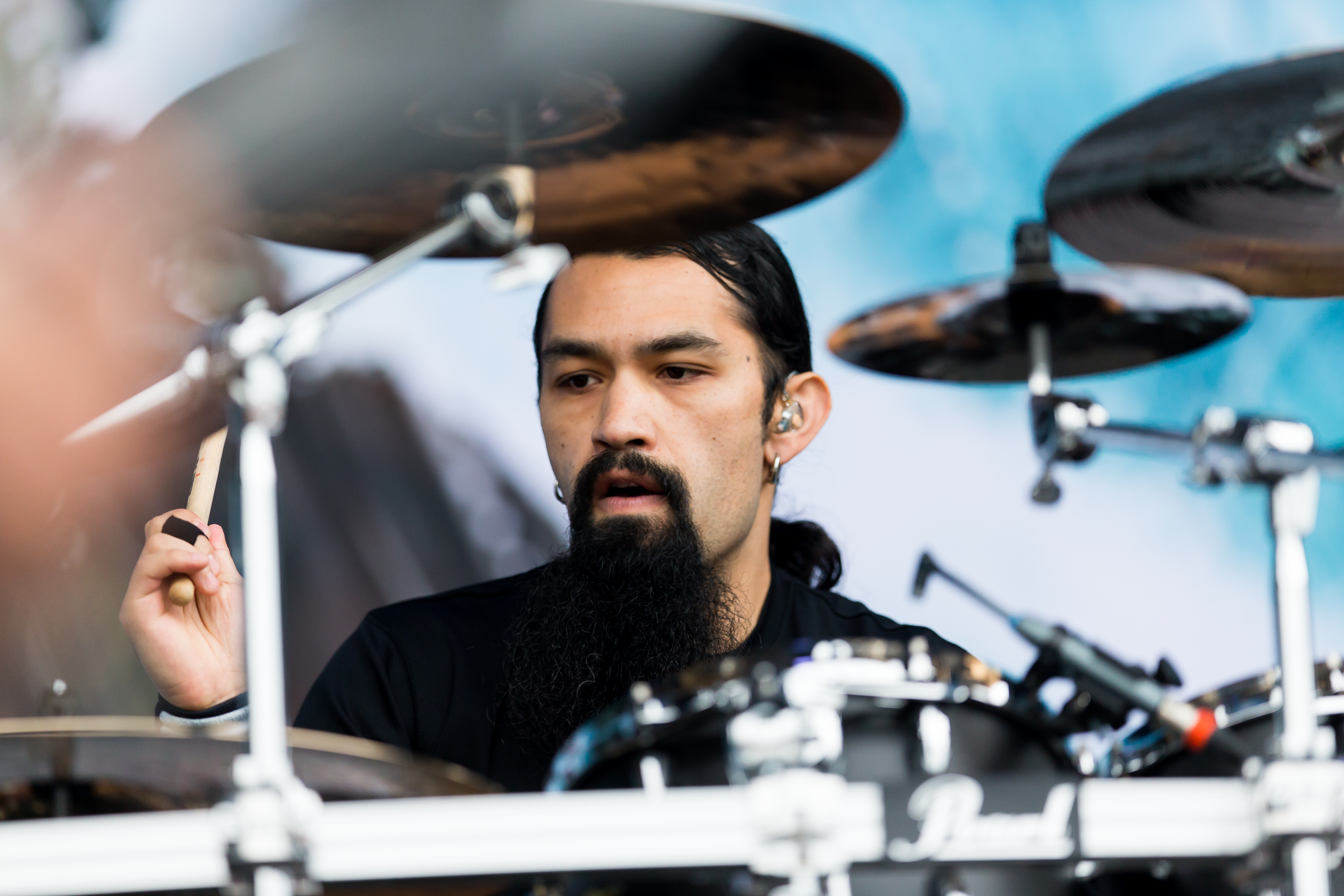
Jocke Wallgren in 2016

On 7 January 2019, the band announced that they had finished recording their 11th studio album with producer Jay Ruston, tentatively due in the spring. Vocalist Johan Hegg stated that he waited for the music to be completed before writing any lyrics, a different approach compared to previous albums. While saying that it is not a concept album, Hegg revealed that one of the tracks was titled "Berserker At Stamford Bridge" and "The Shield Wall". He stated, "It's also about sticking together in the face of adversity. Then there's more introverted stuff, as well – songs that relate to my private life, and I got the ideas for those songs from my wife."

In May 2019, Amon Amarth embarked on a North American tour as part of Slayer's final world tour, featuring Lamb of God and Cannibal Corpse.

On 19 March 2019, the band released a song titled "Raven's Flight" and revealed the name of their next album was Berserker, released on 3 May 2019.

On 15 April 2019, Amon Amarth announced a headlining tour of North America to begin in September in support of Berserker alongside fellow Swedish bands Arch Enemy, At the Gates and Grand Magus.

On 17 April 2019, the band released the music video for Berserker's second single, "Crack the Sky".

On 3 May 2019, the band released the album Berserker.

In Late 2019, it was announced the band would play South America with support from Powerwolf. The tour was scheduled between 28 February, beginning in Brasilia, and ending on 21 March in Bogota. However, the tour ended on 14 March after the Hell and Heaven Metal Fest in Mexico due to the COVID-19 pandemic.

On 28 May 2021, the band released a re-recorded version of the song "Masters of War" for the 20th anniversary of their third album, The Crusher.

On 16 February 2022, the band released the standalone single "Put Your Back Into the Oar."

=== The Great Heathen Army (2022–2025) ===
Amon Amarth announced in June 2022 that their 12th full-length album was titled The Great Heathen Army. It is the first album to feature the band on the album cover since their debut album. Paired with the announcement of the album was a release of a music video for "Get in the Ring" featuring Erick Redbeard, a wrestler for AEW. The album was released on 5 August 2022.

Amon Amarth toured with Machine Head as a part of the Vikings and Lionhearts Tour 2022, a concert tour of Europe taking place in September and October 2022.

Amon Amarth headlined 2022 the Great Heathen Tour of North America in November and December 2022, with support from Carcass, Obituary, and Cattle Decapitation.

Amon Amarth headlined the 2024 Metal Crushes All tour in April and May 2024, with support from Cannibal Corpse, Obituary, and Frozen Soul.

=== The Allfather Awakens (2026–present) ===
Amon Amarth toured with Dethklok with support from Castle Rat in April and May 2026. The band appeared at Welcome to Rockville, which took place in Daytona Beach, Florida in May 2026.

On 23 July 2026, the band announced that their thirteenth studio album titled The Allfather Awakens would be released on 2 October 2026. Singles were released for the tracks "Gjallarhorn", "Upphaf", and "We Rule the Waves".

== Musical style and lyrics ==
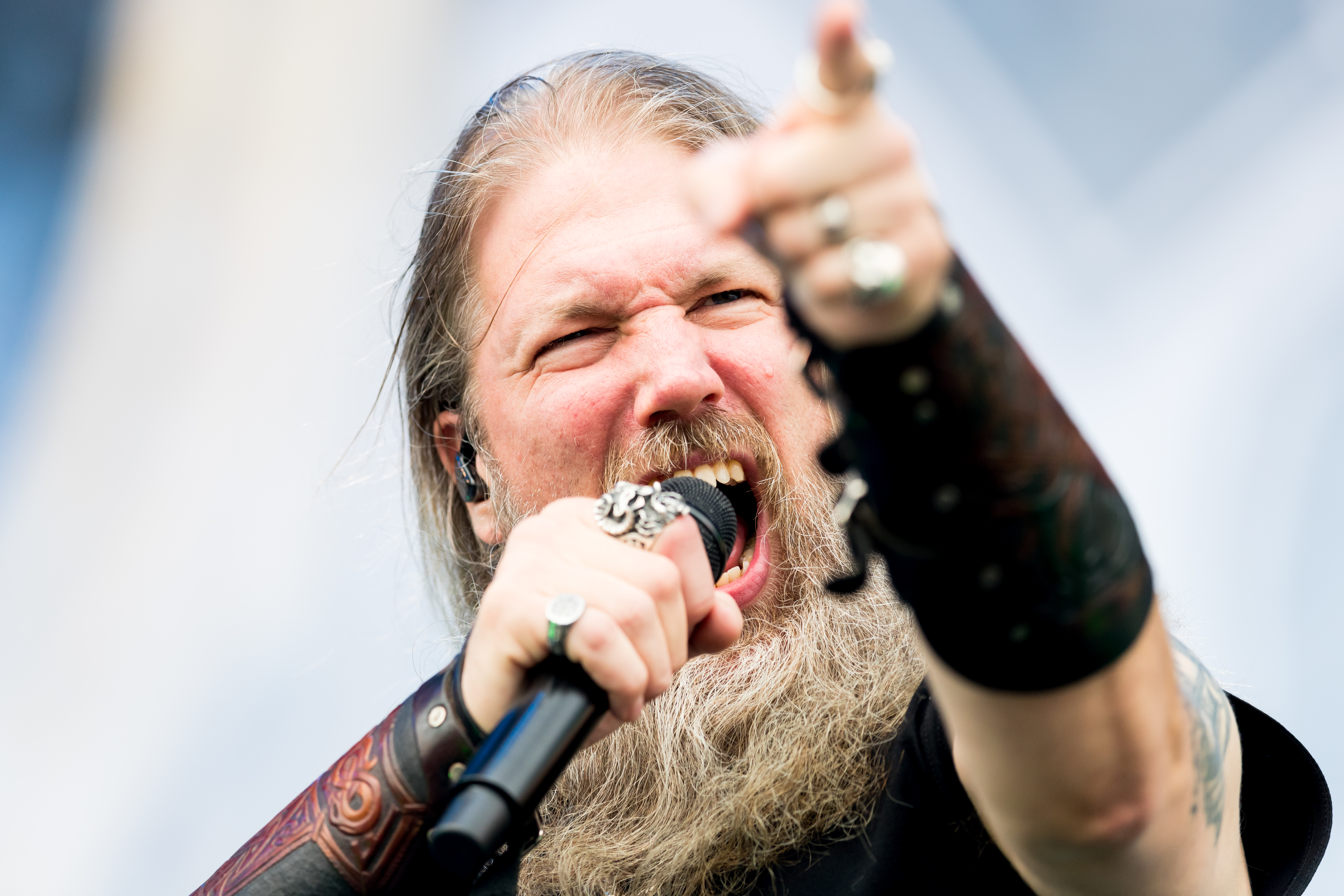
Frontman Johan Hegg

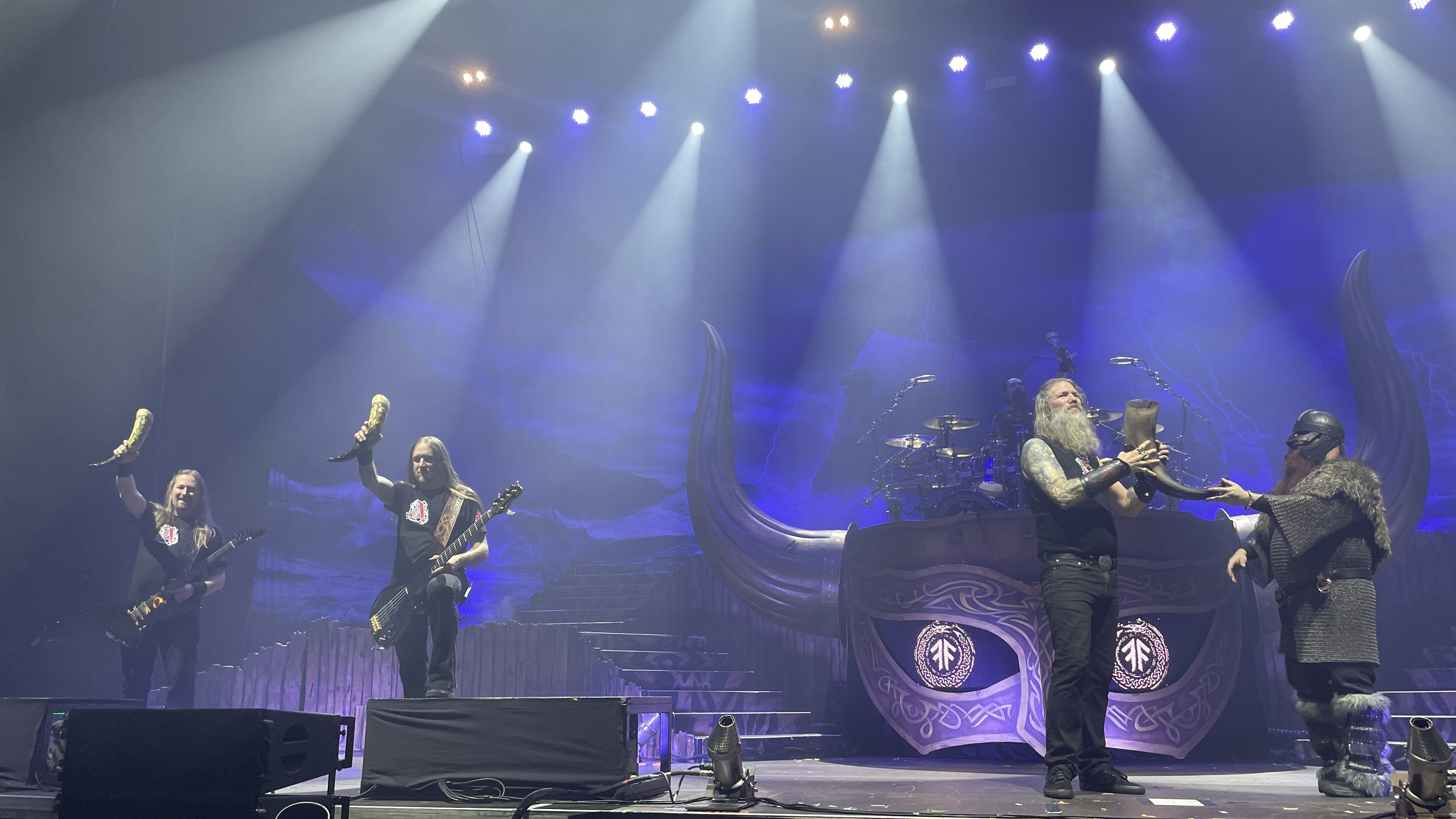
Amon Amarth is enjoying the drinkshow

As Scum, the band played grindcore. In 1992, the band changed their name to Amon Amarth and adopted a more death metal-oriented style. The band is usually considered melodic death metal.

The band bases most of its song lyrics on Norse mythology, the Viking Age, and the pre-Christian world, themes that have traditionally been present in Viking metal. Viking metal emerged in the late 1980s and early 1990s as an offshoot of black metal, popularized by bands like Bathory and Enslaved. Though a death metal band, Amon Amarth is often labeled as Viking metal due to its lyrical themes.

In regard to the band's reputation as a Viking metal band, Imke von Helden writes in "Barbarians and Literature: Viking Metal and its Links to Old Norse Mythology" that "During the 1990s, Swedish Amon Amarth added a new dimension to the definition of viking metal by means of its death metal style of music." She further explains in "Scandinavian Metal Attack: The Power of Northern Europe in Extreme Metal" that

Though most Viking metal bands have a black metal background, Viking metal is defined by topics rather than music. That is why death metal bands like Amon Amarth and Unleashed are often included in the league of Viking metal bands.

— Imke von Helden

When asked to comment on the band's genre, vocalist Johan Hegg remarked:

We play death metal. We write about Vikings so, therefore, some refer us to Viking metal, but I have no idea what that is. I can't imagine the Vikings were into metal at all except on the swords and stuff. And musically, I guess they only played these strange lip instruments and some bongos or whatever.

— The Metal Web's interview with Johan Hegg

Hegg has also addressed the band's relationship to the pagan metal phenomenon and its choice of subject matter:

We don't really see ourselves as one of those bands doing pagan folklore music. The reason we took the Viking theme and mythology theme as a lyrical theme for the band was, perhaps, more accidental from the start. When we wrote the first song with Viking lyrics, we felt it was a topic that suited the music that we wanted to write really well...It was something different, as well, from a lot of other bands. In Sweden, I think only Bathory and Unleashed had done anything like it. For us, it was to do something different, to stand out a little bit, to use those lyrics.

— The Norse Mythology Blog's interview with Johan Hegg

Journalists have noted that, due to the co-opting of Viking and Norse mythology and related symbolism by members of white supremacist or neo-Nazi groups (especially by metal bands with white supremacist or neo-Nazi members), Amon Amarth has sometimes been mistakenly assumed to be associated with such ideologies. As examples against such associations, Sophia DeBoick of The New European noted Hegg's disapproval of a Kentucky official's refusal to issue same-sex marriage licenses, as well as a disclaimer on the Grimfrost website which states that the company does not "approve the usage of cultural features or the symbolism of our forefathers in association with white supremacy, racial elitism or other forms of extremism." Beat Magazine's Kosa Monteith referred to the band's Viking aesthetic as "almost camp or kitschy", arguing that their resistance of the "Viking metal" label derives from "Vikings being somewhat co-opted by the far right and fascists for their own shitty ends. Amon Amarth aren't fascists. They're not Nazis. Not even Scandi occultists [...] They don't claim to be honouring the spiritual tradition of a thousand-year racial ancestry. The name? Not Norse. Not even Swedish. It's Elvish: the name for Tolkien's Mount Doom. They're just pleasant dudes geeking out about fantasy and cool stories. Which is pretty metal."

== Band members ==
Current

- Olavi Mikkonen − lead guitar (1992–present)
- Johan Hegg − vocals (1992–present)
- Ted Lundström − bass (1992–present)
- Johan Söderberg − rhythm guitar (1998–present)
- Jocke Wallgren − drums (2016–present)

Former

- Niko Kaukinen − drums (1992–1996)
- Anders Hansson − rhythm guitar (1992–1998)
- Martin Lopez − drums (1996–1998)
- Fredrik Andersson − drums (1998–2015)

Session

- Tobias Gustafsson − drums (2015–2016)

== Discography ==
Amon Amarth logo

- Once Sent from the Golden Hall (1998)
- The Avenger (1999)
- The Crusher (2001)
- Versus the World (2002)
- Fate of Norns (2004)
- With Oden on Our Side (2006)
- Twilight of the Thunder God (2008)
- Surtur Rising (2011)
- Deceiver of the Gods (2013)
- Jomsviking (2016)
- Berserker (2019)
- The Great Heathen Army (2022)
- The Allfather Awakens (2026)
