= Fate of Norns =

Studio album by Amon Amarth
- Released: 6 September 2004
- Recorded: May/June 2004
- Studio: Berno Studios in Malmö, Sweden
- Genre: Melodic death metal
- Length: 39:58
- Label: Metal Blade
- Producer: Berno Paulsson, Amon Amarth

Amon Amarth chronology
Versus the World (2002)	Fate of Norns (2004)	With Oden on Our Side (2006)

Professional ratings
Review scores
Source	Rating
AllMusic	4/5 stars

Fate of Norns is the fifth studio album by Swedish melodic death metal band Amon Amarth. It was released on 6 September 2004 through Metal Blade Records. This album continued their slower, heavier sound which started on the previous album Versus the World. Before Fate of Norns was officially released by Metal Blade, promo copies were distributed with CD-ROM extras including pictures, biographies, sheets and logos. The album was released in conventional LP format as well as a limited digipak edition. The latter includes a live bonus DVD, Amon Amarth Live at Grand Rokk, which features live recordings and three-camera footage of a live performance in Reykjavík, Iceland on 5 March 2004. "The Pursuit of Vikings" was also made into a music video.

When asked to comment on the album, lead vocalist Johan Hegg, remarked:

The sound is more mature than on previous albums. I think the foundation for this sound started when we changed studios from Abyss to Berno when we got to working with Berno Paulsson. We improved the sound a lot for this album. We were able to make all the instruments work better together and still make them prominent one by one in the production as well. We were also able to keep the heaviness and brutality we need to be Amon Amarth.

— Johan Hegg

== Track listing ==
All songs written and composed by Amon Amarth.

No.	Title	Length
1.	"An Ancient Sign of Coming Storm"	4:38
2.	"Where Death Seems to Dwell"	4:58
3.	"The Fate of Norns"	5:57
4.	"The Pursuit of Vikings"	4:30
5.	"Valkyries Ride"	4:57
6.	"The Beheading of a King"	3:24
7.	"Arson"	6:45
8.	"Once Sealed in Blood"	4:50
Total length:		39:58

Live at Grand RokkReykjavík 2004 in Reykjavík, Iceland - Limited digipak edition bonus DVD
No.	Title	Length
1.	"Death in Fire"	4:58
2.	"For the Stabwounds in our Backs"	4:58
3.	"The Last with Pagan Blood"	5:39
4.	"Masters of War"	4:30
5.	"The Sound of Eight Hooves"	4:57
6.	"Bloodshed"	5:24
7.	"Versus the World"	5:24
8.	"Siegreicher Marsch"	8:11
Total length:		44:00

== Personnel ==
=== Band members ===
- Johan Hegg – vocals
- Olavi Mikkonen – lead guitar
- Johan Söderberg – rhythm guitar
- Ted Lundström – bass
- Fredrik Andersson – drums

=== Other ===
- Mixed and mastered at Berno Studio by Berno Paulsson
- Horn on "Arson" by Udo Schlangschnabel
