= Versus the World (Amon Amarth album) =

Studio album by Amon Amarth
- Released: 18 November 2002
- Recorded: August 2002
- Studio: Berno Studios in Malmö, Sweden
- Genre: Melodic death metal
- Length: 47:49
- Label: Metal Blade
- Producer: Berno Paulsson, Amon Amarth

Amon Amarth chronology
The Crusher (2001)	Versus the World (2002)	Fate of Norns (2004)

Professional ratings
Review scores
Source	Rating
Rock Hard	9/10
AllMusic	4/5 stars

Versus the World is the fourth studio album by Swedish melodic death metal band Amon Amarth, released on 18 November 2002 by Metal Blade Records. It was also released with a bonus disc featuring the Sorrow Throughout the Nine Worlds EP as well as their two demos; Thor Arise, The Arrival of the Fimbul Winter (the first being unreleased before) and a German version of "Victorious March" entitled "Siegreicher Marsch" which was on Once Sent from the Golden Hall. The song "Death in Fire" was made into a music video. Versus the World was the first Amon Amarth album to showcase a more midpaced and heavy sound, unlike their earlier faster works. A deluxe edition was released in 2009 that featured the album remastered by Jens Bogren, and a bonus cd of the original album played live in its entirety in Bochum, Germany.

When asked to comment on the album, vocalist Johan Hegg remarked:

This is the darkest, heaviest and most melancholic album we've ever done and the atmosphere can be felt through the whole album. I would say it's the most even album we've done so far and that the concept can be recognized in every song.

— Johan Hegg interview with The Metal Web

== Reception ==
In 2005, Versus the World was ranked number 413 in Rock Hard magazine's book of The 500 Greatest Rock & Metal Albums of All Time.

== Track listing ==
All tracks are written by Amon Amarth.

No.	Title	Length
1.	"Death in Fire"	4:54
2.	"For the Stabwounds in Our Backs"	4:56
3.	"Where Silent Gods Stand Guard"	5:46
4.	"Versus the World"	5:22
5.	"Across the Rainbow Bridge"	4:51
6.	"Down the Slopes of Death"	4:09
7.	"Thousand Years of Oppression"	5:42
8.	"Bloodshed"	5:13
9.	"...And Soon the World Will Cease to Be"	6:57
Total length:		47:49

Limited Viking Edition bonus CD
No.	Title	Length
1.	"Siegreicher Marsch" (German version of "Victorious March"')	7:54
2.	"Sorrow Throughout the Nine Worlds" (taken from Sorrow Throughout the Nine Worlds EP)	3:53
3.	"The Arrival of the Fimbul Winter" (taken from Sorrow Throughout the Nine Worlds EP)	4:26
4.	"Burning Creation" (taken from Sorrow Throughout the Nine Worlds EP)	4:57
5.	"The Mighty Doors of the Speargod's Hall" (taken from Sorrow Throughout the Nine Worlds EP)	5:43
6.	"Under the Grayclouded Winter Sky" (taken from Sorrow Throughout the Nine Worlds EP)	5:36
7.	"Burning Creation" (taken from The Arrival of the Fimbul Winter demo)	4:47
8.	"Arrival of the Fimbul Winter" (taken from The Arrival of the Fimbul Winter demo)	4:38
9.	"Without Fear" (taken from The Arrival of the Fimbul Winter demo)	4:42
10.	"Risen from the Sea" (taken from Thor Arise demo)	5:43
11.	"Atrocious Humanity" (taken from Thor Arise demo)	5:54
12.	"Army of Darkness" (taken from Thor Arise demo)	5:27
13.	"Thor Arise" (taken from Thor Arise demo)	6:31
14.	"Sabbath Bloody Sabbath" (Black Sabbath cover; taken from Thor Arise demo)	4:22
Total length:		74:38

2009 remastered edition bonus CD
No.	Title	Length
1.	"Death in Fire" (live in Bochum, Germany in 2008)	5:08
2.	"For the Stabwounds in Our Backs" (live in Bochum in 2008)	5:20
3.	"Where Silent Gods Stand Guard" (live in Bochum in 2008)	5:49
4.	"Versus the World" (live in Bochum in 2008)	5:58
5.	"Across the Rainbow Bridge" (live in Bochum in 2008)	5:07
6.	"Down the Slopes of Death" (live in Bochum in 2008)	4:38
7.	"Thousand Years of Oppression" (live in Bochum in 2008)	6:07
8.	"Bloodshed" (live in Bochum in 2008)	5:43
9.	"...And Soon the World Will Cease to Be" (live in Bochum in 2008)	7:08
Total length:		50:58

== Release history ==
Region	Date
Europe	18 November 2002
North America	14 January 2003

== Personnel ==
=== Band members ===
- Johan Hegg – vocals
- Olavi Mikkonen – lead guitar
- Johan Söderberg – rhythm guitar
- Ted Lundström – bass
- Fredrik Andersson – drums

=== Other ===
- Produced and engineered by Berno Paulsson.
- Mixed and mastered by Henrik Larsson in September 2002.
- Cover by Tom Thiel and Thomas Everhard
