= Twilight of the Thunder God =

Studio album by Amon Amarth
- Released: 17 September 2008
- Recorded: May–June 2008
- Studios: Fascination Street Studio in Örebro, Sweden
- Genre: Melodic death metal
- Length: 43:34
- Label: Metal Blade
- Producer: Jens Bogren

Amon Amarth chronology
With Oden on Our Side (2006)	Twilight of the Thunder God (2008)	Surtur Rising (2011)

Twilight of the Thunder God is the seventh studio album by Swedish melodic death metal band Amon Amarth. Twilight of the Thunder God was released in September 2008. The album's name and title track refer to Thor's slaying of the Midgard Serpent Jörmungandr.

== Background ==
In anticipation of this album, there was a series of six vlog-format studio diaries which displayed the recording process of this album in the studio. The first focused on Fredrik Andersson recording the drums. The second vlog focused on Olavi Mikkonen recording the rhythm guitar position. The third vlog focused on Ted Lundström recording bass guitar and band members preparing food. The fourth episode focused on Johan Hegg recording vocals. The fifth video was Johan Söderberg performing and recording guitar solos. The final vlog featured Olavi Mikkonen and Ted Lundström packing up the studio, as well as an album preview.

A series of 8-page comics were made during the production of the album, eponymously entitled "Twilight of the Thunder God", released in magazines throughout Europe.

On 27 June 2008, the title of this album was announced. Twilight of the Thunder God features several guest appearances featuring Entombed vocalist Lars-Göran Petrov on "Guardians of Asgaard", Children of Bodom and Stone guitarist Roope Latvala who contributes a solo on the track "Twilight of the Thunder God", and Finnish cello metal band Apocalyptica guesting on "Live for the Kill".

Approximately a month later on 25 July 2008, the album artwork was revealed, featuring Thor, the Norse God of Thunder, in battle with Jörmungandr.

On 27 August 2008, Amon Amarth released the information that they had recently finished work on a video clip for the title track of the album. The video clip was shot in Jomsborg, Poland. The band notes that while they were there, a heavy storm came through the town, resulting in the roughest conditions the band has ever shot a music video in.

== Reception ==
Professional ratings
Aggregate scores
Source	Rating
Metacritic	(80/100)
Review scores
Source	Rating
About.com	4.5/5 stars
AllMusic	3.5/5 stars
Blabbermouth	7.5/10 stars
IGN	8/10 stars
PopMatters	8/10 stars
Sputnikmusic	4/5 stars

The album debuted at number 50 on the Billboard 200, and debuted at number 11 on the Swedish album charts. This makes the band's first album to chart on the top 200, and also the band's highest chart debut in their native country of Sweden, debuting 10 places higher than their previous release, With Oden on Our Side.

Initial critical response to Twilight of the Thunder God was positive. At Metacritic, which assigns a normalized rating out of 100 to reviews from mainstream critics, the album has received an average score of 80, based on 5 reviews.

The album was ranked number six on Metal Hammer's Top 50 Albums of 2008.

== Legacy ==
The title track has been covered by many metal artists - most notably, Swedish power metal band Sabaton as a bonus track on various renditions of their 2012 album Carolus Rex, Corvus Corax on their 2013 album Gimlie, Swiss metal band Rage of Light in 2017, and Feuerschwanz on the Deluxe Edition of their 2021 album Memento Mori.

== Track listing ==
All tracks are written by Amon Amarth.

No.	Title	Length
1.	"Twilight of the Thunder God" (featuring Roope Latvala)	4:09
2.	"Free Will Sacrifice"	4:09
3.	"Guardians of Asgaard" (featuring Lars-Göran Petrov)	4:23
4.	"Where Is Your God?"	3:11
5.	"Varyags of Miklagaard"	4:18
6.	"Tattered Banners and Bloody Flags"	4:30
7.	"No Fear for the Setting Sun"	3:54
8.	"The Hero"	4:02
9.	"Live for the Kill" (featuring Apocalyptica)	4:10
10.	"Embrace of the Endless Ocean"	6:44
Total length:		43:34

Live at Summer Breeze Open Air 2007 - Limited digibook edition bonus DVD/CD
No.	Title	Length
1.	"Intro"	2:38
2.	"Valhall Awaits Me"	4:48
3.	"Runes to My Memory"	4:45
4.	"Cry of the Black Birds"	4:34
5.	"Asator"	3:35
6.	"Pursuit of Vikings"	5:50
7.	"Fate of Norns"	6:50
8.	"Without Fear"	4:31
9.	"With Oden on Our Side"	4:47
10.	"Where Silent Gods Stand Guard"	7:31
11.	"An Ancient Sign of Coming Storm"	4:56
12.	"Victorious March"	8:47
13.	"Death in Fire"	6:02
Total length:		69:34

== Personnel ==
=== Band members ===
- Johan Hegg − vocals
- Olavi Mikkonen − lead guitar
- Johan Söderberg − rhythm guitar
- Ted Lundström − bass
- Fredrik Andersson − drums

=== Guest musicians ===
- Lars-Göran Petrov − vocals on "Guardians of Asgaard"
- Roope Latvala − guitar solo on "Twilight of the Thunder God"
- Apocalyptica − cellos on "Live for the Kill"
- Ronny Milianowicz – horns, brass, choir vocals on “Tattered Banners and Bloody Flags”

=== Credits ===
- Tom Thiel − album artwork
- Peter Damin − drum technician

== Charts ==
Chart (2008)	Peak position
Hungarian Albums (MAHASZ)	33

== Release history ==
Region	Date	Label	Format
Sweden, Finland	17 September 2008	Metal Blade	CD
Denmark, Austria, Switzerland, Italy	19 September 2008	Metal Blade	CD
The rest of Europe	22 September 2008	Metal Blade	CD
North America and elsewhere	30 September 2008	Metal Blade	CD, Enhanced CD
