= Once Sent from the Golden Hall =

Studio album by Amon Amarth
- Released: 10 February 1998
- Recorded: 1997
- Studio: The Abyss
- Genre: Melodic death metal
- Length: 44:51
- Label: Metal Blade
- Producer: Peter Tägtgren, Amon Amarth

Amon Amarth chronology
Sorrow Throughout the Nine Worlds (1996)	Once Sent from the Golden Hall (1998)	The Avenger (1999)

Professional ratings
Review scores
Source	Rating
About.com	4/5 stars
AllMusic	2.5/5 stars

Once Sent from the Golden Hall is the debut studio album by Swedish melodic death metal band Amon Amarth, released by Metal Blade Records on 10 February 1998. The album was originally limited and only 1000 copies were sold on CD and LP versions. Later the album was re-released by Metal Blade in 2005 on Picture LP with 500 hand-counted copies. A deluxe edition was released in 2009 that featured the album remastered by Jens Bogren, and a bonus CD of the original album played live in its entirety in Bochum, Germany. Martin Lopez left the band soon after the release of this album to join Swedish band Opeth, making this the only album with him on drums. Likewise, it is also the only album to feature guitarist Anders Hansson.

The artwork for the 2009 remastered edition features four swords (like the ones used to form the 'A A' on the inside flap) bordering the original image. The band's logo sits half an inch above the swords in flaming letters using the band's signature font, below the four swords is the album title. All artwork was created by Peter Kinmark.

== Track listing ==
No.	Title	Lyrics	Music	Length
1.	"Ride for Vengeance"	Johan Hegg	Olavi Mikkonen	4:30
2.	"The Dragons' Flight Across the Waves"	Hegg	Mikkonen	4:35
3.	"Without Fear"	Hegg	Mikkonen; Anders Hansson	4:50
4.	"Victorious March"	Hegg; Mikkonen	Mikkonen	7:58
5.	"Friends of the Suncross"	Hegg	Mikkonen	4:43
6.	"Abandoned"	Hegg	Mikkonen	6:02
7.	"Amon Amarth"	Hegg; Ted Lundström	Mikkonen	8:08
8.	"Once Sent from the Golden Hall"	Hegg	Mikkonen	4:11
Total length:				44:57

2009 remastered edition bonus track
No.	Title	Length
9.	"Siegreicher Marsch" (German version of "Victorious March"')	7:54
Total length:		52:51

2009 remastered edition bonus CD
No.	Title	Length
1.	"Ride for Vengeance" (live in Bochum, Germany in 2008)	4:38
2.	"The Dragons' Flight Across the Waves" (live in Bochum, Germany in 2008)	5:02
3.	"Without Fear" (live in Bochum, Germany in 2008)	4:18
4.	"Victorious March" (live in Bochum, Germany in 2008)	7:32
5.	"Friends of the Suncross" (live in Bochum, Germany in 2008)	4:33
6.	"Abandoned" (live in Bochum, Germany in 2008)	5:59
7.	"Amon Amarth" (live in Bochum, Germany in 2008)	8:27
8.	"Once Sent from the Golden Hall" (live in Bochum, Germany in 2008)	4:33
Total length:		45:02

== Personnel ==
=== Amon Amarth ===
- Johan Hegg – vocals
- Olavi Mikkonen – lead guitar
- Anders Hansson – rhythm guitar
- Ted Lundström – bass
- Martin Lopez – drums

=== Other ===
- Engineered by Peter Tägtgren
- Cover by Peter Kinmark
