= Vexed (disambiguation) =

Vexed is British comedy-drama, police procedural television series.

Vexed may also refer to:

- Vexed (British band), British metal band
- Vexed (Italian band), Italian thrash metal band
- "Vexed" (Dizzee Rascal song), 2003

== See also ==
- Vex (disambiguation)
