= The Wrong Stuff =

The Wrong Stuff may refer to

- "The Wrong Stuff" (Quantum Leap episode)
- "The Wrong Stuff" (G.I. Joe: A Real American Hero episode)
- "The Wrong Stuff" (Saved by the Bell: The New Class episode)
- "The Wrong Stuff" (The Hogan Family episode)
- "The Wrong Stuff" (Gama bomb song)
