= Leprous =

Norwegian progressive metal band

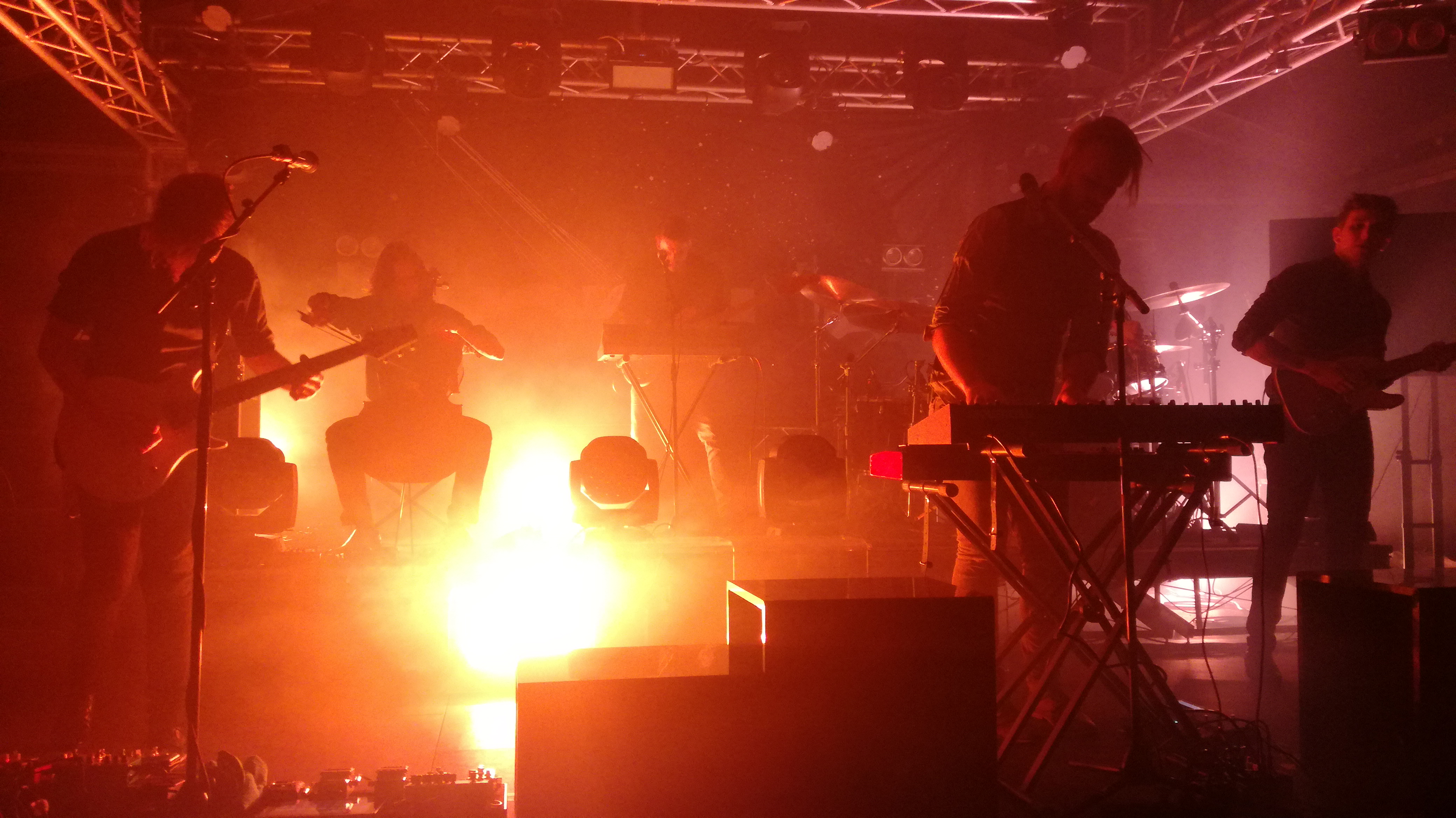
- Leprous performing in 2017 during their Malina Tour

Background information
- Origin: Notodden, Norway
- Genres: Progressive metal; progressive rock; avant-garde metal; alternative metal
- Years active: 2001–present
- Labels: Sensory Records; Inside Out/Century Media
- Spinoff of: Ihsahn
- Members: Einar Solberg; Tor Oddmund Suhrke; Robin Ognedal; Baard Kolstad; Simen Børven
- Past members: Stian Lonar; Esben Meyer Kristensen; Kenneth Solberg; Truls Vennman; Halvor Strand; Tor Stian Borhaug; Rein Blomquist; Martin Skrebergene; Øystein Landsverk; Tobias Ørnes Andersen
- Website: leprous.net

Leprous is a Norwegian progressive metal band formed in 2001 by singer and keyboardist Einar Solberg and guitarist Tor Oddmund Suhrke. After releasing several demos with relatively unstable lineups, the band released their first studio album, Tall Poppy Syndrome, in 2009. They subsequently gained prominence as the live backing band of Ihsahn (who is Solberg's brother-in-law), who, in turn, contributed on several Leprous records as guest singer or producer. Their acclaimed 2011 album Bilateral led to further attention.

After two albums which followed a similar musical direction, Coal (2013) and The Congregation (2015), Leprous took a less metal, more rock-oriented approach with Malina (2017), their first record not to feature harsh vocals. The band further experimented on 2019's Pitfalls, which mixes art rock, pop and progressive influences into their established sound. Leprous released their seventh studio album, Aphelion, in 2021, and their eighth studio album titled Melodies of Atonement in 2024. Their albums have received mostly positive reviews.

== History ==
The band's roster solidified by the time they recorded their debut album, Tall Poppy Syndrome in August 2008. American label Sensory Records signed the band and released the album in May 2009. Alex Henderson of AllMusic praised the band's debut for moving past the "staunchly pre-90s mentality" of contemporary progressive metal by blending the influence of Pink Floyd and King Crimson with alternative metal bands such as Tool.

The album received positive reviews while the band gained attention as the live band for Emperor's frontman, Ihsahn, whose wife, Starofash, is the sister to Leprous vocalist/keyboardist Einar Solberg. In 2010, Leprous appeared at ProgPower USA and ProgPower Europe, and later supported Therion on their European tour. After that tour, the band announced that they had split with bassist Halvor Strand, who was replaced by Rein Blomquist.

At the end of February 2011 the band announced that they had signed with Inside Out, with worldwide distribution through Century Media. The band's debut for Inside Out Records, Bilateral, was released on 22 August 2011 in Europe and a day later in North America and featured artwork by American surrealist Jeff Jordan and Spanish designer Ritxi Ostariz. The album featured a guest vocal appearance by Ihsahn and trumpets by Vegard Sandbukt.

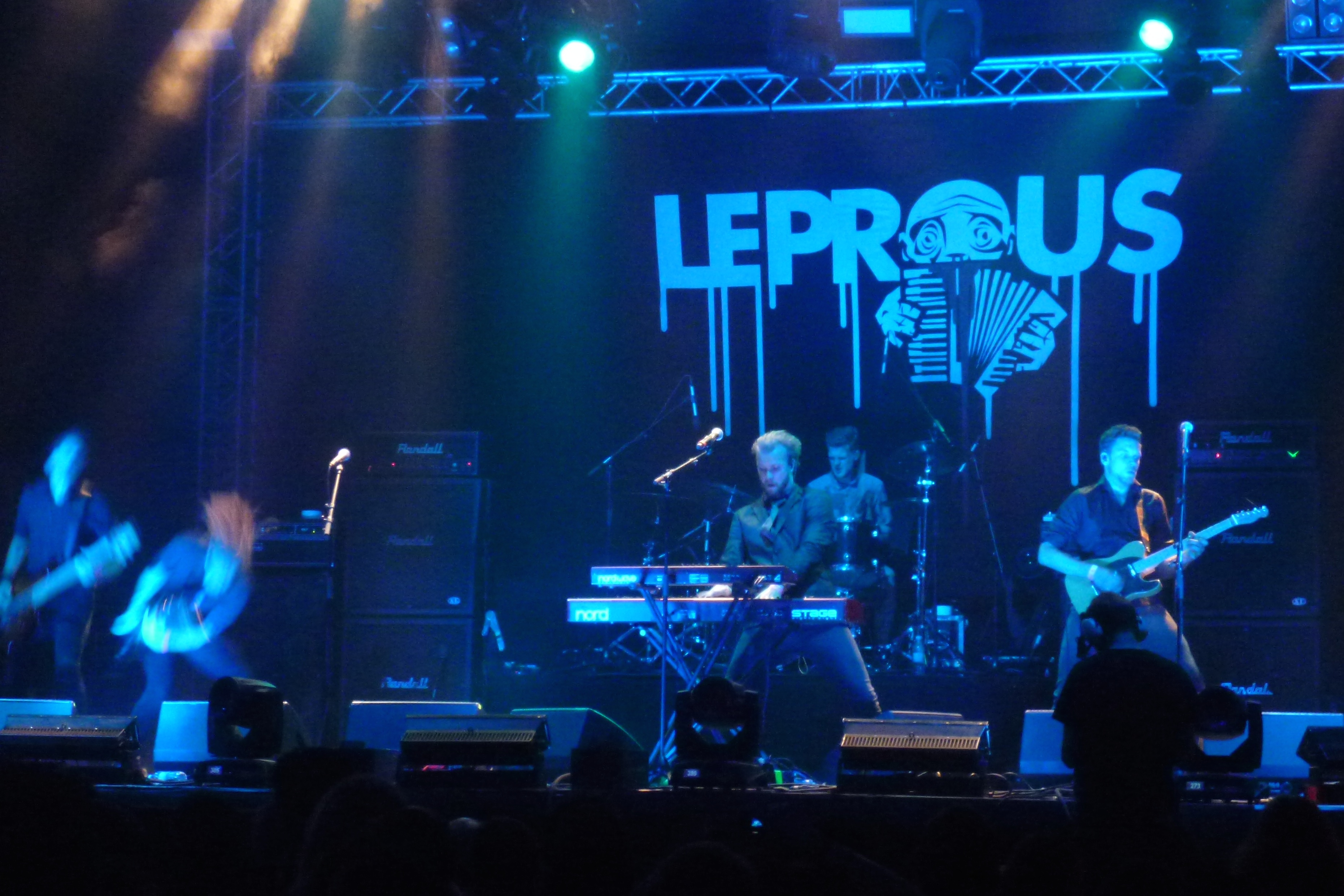
Leprous at Wacken Open Air 2013

On 20 May 2013, Leprous released Coal. Vocalist Einar Solberg described the album as "a more melancholic and darker album than the more playful Bilateral. By darker, I don't mean more aggressive, but more severe. There is still a big range in the dynamics, but no jumping between different moods within a song."

On 5 May 2014, the band announced the departure of drummer Tobias Ørnes Andersen. He was replaced by Baard Kolstad, who played with Leprous throughout their 2013 Coal tour. The statement also revealed that the band was working on material for their next album.

In early June 2014, Prog magazine Radio Show on Team Rock Radio in the United Kingdom published tour dates for an Inside Out records showcase featuring labelmates Haken, Maschine and Leprous for Autumn 2014 in the United Kingdom and Europe.

On 25 May 2015, the album The Congregation was released via Inside Out Music. A video for the track "The Price" was shot and then released on 8 April. On 30 April 2015, another track of the album, "Rewind", was released.

On 1 March 2017, Leprous announced through their official Facebook page that a new studio album would be released. The album, Malina, was released on 25 August 2017.

The band released a new single, "Golden Prayers", on 1 June 2018.

On 25 January 2019, Leprous released a cover of "Angel" by Massive Attack, along with an accompanying music video. The band had already performed the cover live during shows in late 2018.

Leprous entered the studio to record their sixth album in early 2019. The album, titled Pitfalls, was officially announced on 26 August 2019, along with the designated release date of 25 October 2019, as well as the artwork and tracklist.

Leprous continued to regularly perform live throughout 2020 and 2021, with the events streamed online from their home town of Notodden. This included performances of each of their studio albums (except Tall Poppy Syndrome) in full, including multiple live debuts and many songs performed for the first time with the band's current lineup.

On 9 June 2021, Leprous announced their seventh studio album Aphelion, with a release date of 28 August 2021. The band announced that the first single from Aphelion would be released on 26 June 2021.

On 30 May 2024, Leprous announced the release date of their next album Melodies of Atonement along with its lead single "Atonement" in a blog post on their website as well as their X account. Two more singles were released in the interim before the album, "Silently Walking Alone" and "Like a Sunken Ship".

== Musical style and influences ==
Leprous' style is typically classified as progressive metal or progressive rock and singled out for its progressive elements, peculiar harmonies, accomplished vocals, and blending of different genres. Their sound has also been categorized as avant-garde metal and alternative metal. However, the band's members do not affiliate themselves with a specific genre.

While all the members contribute to Leprous' music, Tor Oddmund Suhrke (guitarist) has penned most of the lyrics, and Einar Solberg (singer and keyboardist) composes the backbone for most of their songs; both are the only constant members in the band's line-up. In his formative years, the frontman took singing and piano lessons and he used to notate Leprous songs but later stopped doing so after feeling that their compositions written intuitively were better. The band has emphasized their intention of taking different approaches on every album.

The use of eight-string guitar has been a consistent element of the band's style. Contrary to the prevalent uses in modern progressive metal and djent, Tor Oddmund Suhrke's playing style includes the use of complex chords in a variety of alternate guitar tunings (often necessitated by the fact the chord progressions are originally written by Einar Solberg on keyboard). As of Pitfalls, the use of eight-string guitars has decreased; instead, it is the first album to feature acoustic guitars, as well as band members rotating to perform additional keyboards and percussion live.

Suhrke cited the Mars Volta's Omar Rodríguez-López, Opeth's Mikael Åkerfeldt, Porcupine Tree's Steven Wilson, and the Dillinger Escape Plan's Ben Weinman as his four biggest guitar influences.

== Band members ==
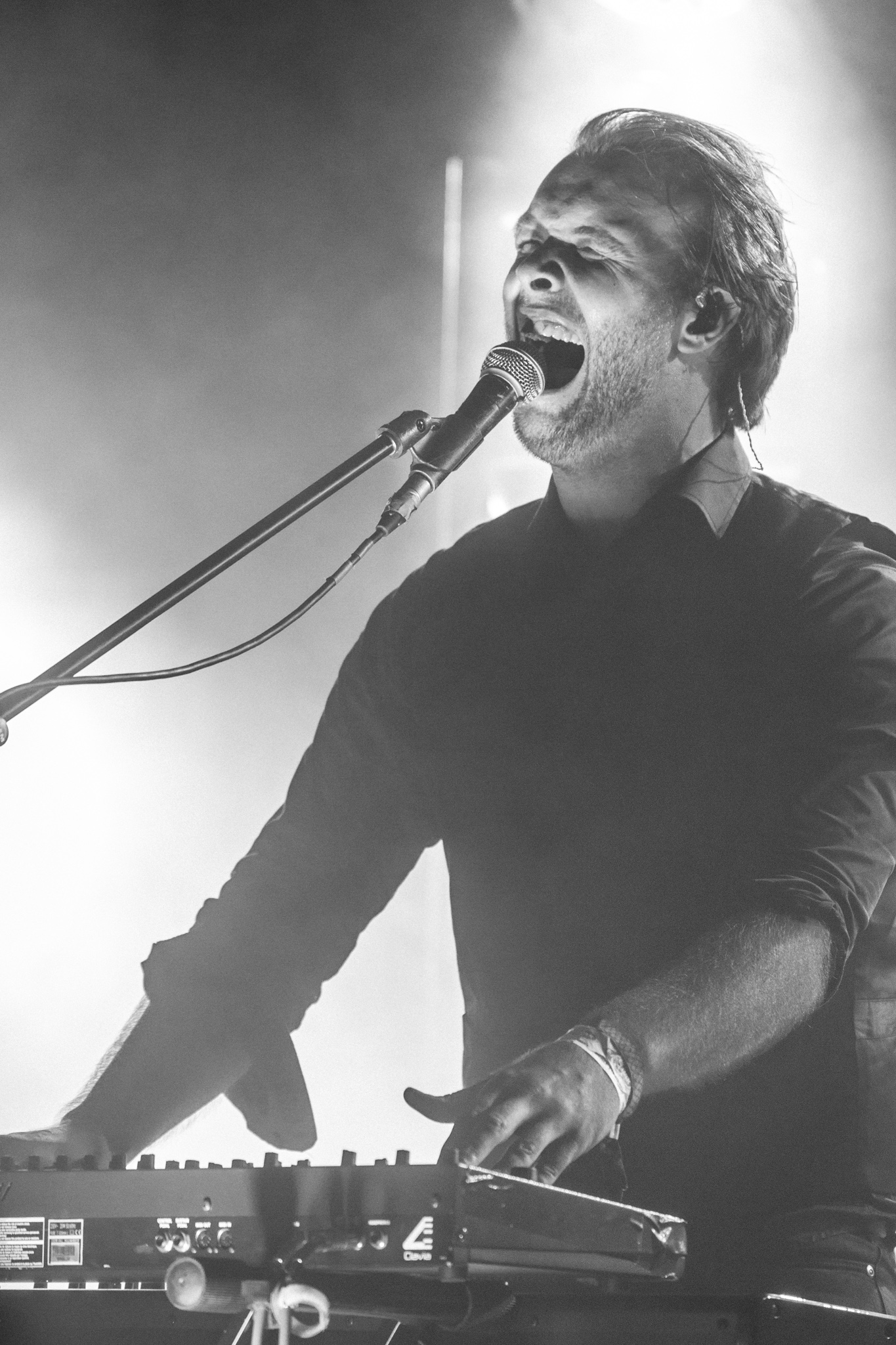
Einar Solberg performing with Leprous in Cologne in October 2014

=== Current ===
- Einar Solberg – lead vocals, keyboards (2001–present)
- Tor Oddmund Suhrke – guitars, backing vocals, keyboards (2001–present)
- Baard Kolstad – drums (2014–present)
- Simen Børven – bass, backing vocals (2015–present)
- Robin Ognedal – guitars, backing vocals (2017–present)

=== Touring ===
- Harrison White - keyboards, backing vocals (2023-present)

=== Former ===
- Stian Lonar – bass (2001–2002)
- Esben Meyer Kristensen – guitars (2001–2003)
- Kenneth Solberg – guitars (2001–2003, 2003–2004)
- Truls Vennman – drums (2001–2005)
- Halvor Strand – bass (2002–2010)
- Øystein Landsverk – guitars, backing vocals (2004–2017)
- Tor Stian Borhaug – drums (2005–2007)
- Tobias Ørnes Andersen – drums (2007–2014)
- Rein Blomquist – bass (2010–2013)
- Martin Skrebergene – bass (2013–2015)
- Raphael Weinroth-Browne – cello, keyboards, backing vocals (2017–2024, touring)
- Pedro Miguel Nuñez Diaz – trumpet (2021)

== Discography ==
=== Studio albums ===
- Tall Poppy Syndrome (2009)
- Bilateral (2011)
- Coal (2013)
- The Congregation (2015)
- Malina (2017)
- Pitfalls (2019)
- Aphelion (2021)
- Melodies of Atonement (2024)

=== Live albums ===
- Live at Rockefeller Music Hall (2016)
- Live 2022 (2023)
- An Evening of Atonement (2025)

=== Demos ===
- Silent Waters (2004)
- Aeolia (2006)
