= Witches Brew (record label) =

European record label

- Founded: May 2002
- Founder: Cheryl Schindler
- Genre: Thrash metal Death metal Heavy metal Speed metal Doom metal
- Country of origin: Germany
- Location: Laaber, Regensburg
- Official website: witchesbrew.eu

Witches Brew is an underground European record label that sells music via online distribution.

== Background ==
Witches Brew was born out of online magazine The Metal Gospel and began signing mainly extreme metal artists in early 2002. The name Witches Brew was inspired by the Manilla Road song "Witches Brew".

== Last artists ==
- Acero Letal
- Acid Age
- Alitor
- Amok
- Blackened
- Chain of Dogs
- Endless Recovery
- Excimer
- Goat of Mendes
- Hammerwhore
- Hillbilly Revenge
- Midnite Hellion
- Nadimac
- Nightbreed
- Pyöveli
- Redimoni
- Saboter
- Shrapnel Storm
- Speed Whöre
- Tyrant's Kall
- Vigilance

== Releases ==
BREW055 – NADIMAC – "Manifest Protiv Sudbine"
BREW054 – SHRAPNEL STORM – "Mother War"
BREW053 – SPEED WHÖRE – "The Future Is Now"
BREW052 – NIGHTBREED – "Nightbreed"
BREW051 – VOLCANIC – "Okkult Witch"
BREW050 – BLACKENED – "Underground Attack"
BREW049 – ACERO LETAL – "Veloz Invencible / Duro Metal"
BREW048 – EXCIMER – "Thrash from Fire"
BREW047 – SABOTER – "Saboter"
BREW046 – HUMAN SLAUGHTER / HILLBILLY REVENGE – "Hillbilly Slaughter"
BREW045 – PYÖVELI – "Still Underground"
BREW044 – ACID AGE – "Drone Shark Ethics"
BREW043 – TYRANT'S KALL – "Dagon"
BREW042 – ENDLESS RECOVERY – "Resistant Bangers"
BREW041 – ALITOR – "Eternal Depression"
BREW040 – REDIMONI / GRAVEYARD – "The Procession of the Gravedemons – The Ultimate Profanation"
BREW039 – TERRA CAPUT MUNDI – "Lost in the Warp"
BREW038 – SEASONS OF THE WOLF – "Anthology"
BREW037 – CHAIN OF DOGS – "Burning Bridges in a World of Death – De Ep's en nog get mieë"
BREW036 – AMOK – "Somewhere in the West"
BREW035 – MIDNITE HELLION "Hour Of The Wolf"
BREW034 – STONE MAGNUM – "From Time... to Eternity"
BREW033 – SACRIFICIAL BLOOD – "Unholy Fucking Hatred"
BREW032 – CHAIN OF DOGS – "Gebroake, gehange en gewroake"
BREW031 – PYÖVELI – "Not a God, Just an Executioner
BREW030 – DEATHHAMMER – "Phantom Knights"
BREW029 – EVIL SHEPHERD – "Sowing Death"
BREW028 – MECHANIX – "Sonic Point Blank"
BREW027 – HORRIFIER – "Grim Fate"
BREW026 – SCYTHE – "Season Of The Tall Pines"
BREW025 – TORTURE PULSE – "Plague Poetry"
BREW024 – AMOK – "Downhill Without Brakes"
BREW023 – SALUTE – "The Underground"
BREW022 – SAURON – "Satanic Assassins"
BREW021 – MADGOYA – "Put Olindrali Avlijanera"
BREW020 – DEATHHAMMER – "Forever Ripping Fast"
BREW019 – IMMACULATE – "Thrash, Kill 'N' Deströy"
BREW018 – REDIMONI – "Into The Coiling Arms Of Mayhem"
BREW017 – PYÖVELI – "The New Renaissance Of Speed & Thrash Metal"
BREW016 – SCYTHE – "Decay"
BREW015 – GAMA BOMB – "Survival of the Fastest"
BREW014 – REDIMONI – "The Onset Of Chaos"
BREW013 – HAMMERWHORE – "Hammerwhore"
BREW012 – DEVIL LEE ROT – "Metalizer"
BREW011 – SCYTHE – "The Process Of Rotting"
BREW010 – VEXED – "Destruction Warfare"
BREW009 – DEVIL LEE ROT – "Metal Dictator / Soldier From Hell"
BREW008 – TOXIC HOLOCAUST – "Evil Never Dies"
BREW007 – SCYTHE – "Poetry Of Illusions"
BREW006 – DEVIL LEE ROT – "Hellscraper / A Little Devil Ain't Enough"
BREW005 – THE CHASM – "Conjuration Of The Spectral Empire"
BREW004 – VEXED – "Nightmare Holocaust"
BREW003 – THARGOS – "Killfukk"
BREW002 – HATEWORK – "Madbent For Disaster"
BREW001 – SCYTHE – "On My Way Home"

== See also ==
- List of record labels
