= Aphelion (Leprous album) =

Studio album by Leprous
- Released: 27 August 2021
- Recorded: 2020–2021
- Studio: Ghostward Studios (Sweden), Ocean Sound Recordings (Norway), Cederberg Studios (Norway)
- Genre: Progressive rock; progressive metal; art rock; hard rock; synth-pop
- Length: 56:10
- Label: Inside Out Music
- Producer: David Castillo; Christer Cederberg; Anders Boska; Henning Svoren

Leprous chronology
Pitfalls (2019)	Aphelion (2021)	Melodies of Atonement (2024)

Singles from Aphelion
- 1. "Castaway Angels" Released: 5 December 2020; 2. "Running Low" Released: 25 June 2021; 3. "The Silent Revelation" Released: 30 July 2021

Aphelion is the seventh studio album by Norwegian progressive metal band Leprous, released on 27 August 2021 via Inside Out Music. The album was first hinted by the single "Castaway Angels" in December 2020, and six months later, the band announced the album and began releasing two singles prior to the album's release; "Running Low" and "The Silent Revelation", plus a music video for "Nighttime Disguise". It was recorded in several recording studios in Scandinavia. During the recording process, longtime collaborator Raphael Weinroth-Browne was involved for the third time in row, contributing with additional cello. Most of the songs were written and composed by Leprous vocalist and keyboardist Einar Solberg.

== Production and composition ==
Leprous recorded the album at Ghostward Studios (Sweden), Ocean Sound Recordings (Norway), and Cederberg Studios (Norway), with producer David Castillo and mix engineer Adam Noble, both known for their production work with Placebo.

Einar Solberg's original idea for the album title was Adapt, "more than anything because we had very much in mind the vital situation in which we currently find ourselves and with which we have been living for a year and a half. When something like this happens it makes you appreciate the life before and the things before the pandemic, and then you have to "adapt" in the way that one can.""The meaning is like when basically the sun is furthest away from you, so whenever the light is furthest away, there are still things you can do. And that's where the word Adapt comes into play. So you adapt, instead of thinking that you wished that you were much closer to the light and that everything was much easier. You just adapt and you do whatever you can with what you have." The new album title "Aphelion" was chosen after "the point in the orbit of an object where it is farthest from the sun, and it has a symbolic value which I will leave to your own interpretation" or "the bridge over the path of a celestial body in heliocentric orbit that is furthest from the star around which it revolves."

The cover artwork, photographed by Øystein Aspelund and graphic-designed by Elena Sigida, is described as "a pyramid in the middle of a Norwegian landscape and at night". The pyramid actually exists somewhere in the middle of the mountains in Western Norway. It represents "that you are trapped in a small building with no possibility of going anywhere, but at the same time, you can see all that wonderful world that surrounds you without the possibility of accessing it or going anywhere. You are confined there, in a tiny area. This whole idea speaks a bit of the many restrictions that we have been living in the last year and a half, but that at the same time, you are capable of doing some things, despite the restrictions to which you are subjected."

The album was not initially planned, but writing and recording commenced while in COVID quarantine. According to Einar Solberg, some of the songs are Pitfalls leftovers that never made it to the final track list. At first, the band intended to make an EP out of them. They recorded the song "Castaway Angels" and "fell in love with that studio", doing more songs there. Later, they tried another studio and recorded some more work there. Solberg described the process of creating the album "kind of a relatively relaxed process compared to before, because it was just like, yeah, let's just build this album gradually. Instead of doing everything in one process, we have like 10 smaller separate processes."

Einar stated how different this album is compared to their previous works, "It's intuitive and spontaneous. We've experimented with many completely different ways of writing music and explored new ways to work. There has been no room for overthinking, exaggerated perfectionism or carefully planned songs. I believe this is one of the strengths of this album. It feels alive, it feels free and it does not come across as too calculated." He also pointed out the advantages and challenges for the band when adapting to the pandemic, saying that they were able to do a lot of streams and record and compose music and that touring wasn't "the only thing we can do. Of course, we've had challenges, like everyone has had, but you can either adapt to the situation and do something, or you can think about how much better things used to be before."

Alongside session cellist Raphael Weinroth-Browne and session violinist Chris Baum, the group Blåsemafian performed brass for the album, specifically the songs "Running Low", "Out of Here", and "Nighttime Disguise". Due to COVID restrictions, Blåsemafian did not record in the same studio as Leprous, using instead their own facility.

Einar Solberg stated that this album "seems to be quite free, especially compared to Pitfalls", but both albums are what he considered "maybe the only really personal albums". Unlike Pitfalls which "is in the more early stages of discovering that you're struggling with it, and kind of panicking a bit and not in acceptance of the situation whatsoever, Aphelion is in a much later stage when you've gotten to work a lot with it and gotten further and gotten to accept the fact that it's something that you probably have to live with during your life, but that it is something that gradually fades more and more in the background."

The band has planned to perform the entire album live on stream. Solberg said they're going to play two shows in a day, so they have to take care of themselves in order to play the whole album twice. They have also planned a tour in December that will also celebrate the 20th anniversary of the band's inception, along with the possibility of releasing their demos. According to Solberg, they wish they could release Aeolia or the demos that came before.

The final track "Nighttime Disguise" was written with the help of fans, who bought tickets to watch the band throughout a week as they streamed the process of creating a song based on parameters (such as the time signature, the vocal style, the dynamics, the key, the tempo and the instrumentation) that had previously been chosen by the fans via a poll. The end of that song displays Solberg's growl vocals for the first time in five years.

== Promotion ==
"Castaway Angels" was first released as a standalone single on 5 December 2020. The album's pre-release singles "Running Low" and "The Silent Revelation" debuted on 25 June and 30 July 2021, respectively. Aphelion was released by Inside Out Music on 27 August; on that same day a video for closing track "Nighttime Disguise" was released. Leprous will begin a European headlining tour in December that would also be a 20th anniversary tour for the band.

== Reception ==
Professional ratings
Review scores
Source	Rating
Blabbermouth.net	8/10
Blezt	6.7/10
Sonic Perspectives	9/10
Louder Sound	4/5
Science of Noise	8.5/10
Metal Storm	7.8/10
Metal Injection	9/10
Prog Radio	4/5 stars
ViaOmega	9.5/10
Metal.de	9/10

Magazines Prog has two reviews written for Aphelion, considering the album among the best releases of 2021, with one unrated review stating, "With Aphelion, Leprous have cast off the last vestiges of progressive metal. The album touches on prog, djent, pop, funk, trip hop and electronica, but the result is much greater than the sum of its parts. Nobody else sounds like this: Leprous have entered uncharted territory, proving utterly fearless in the process."

Andrea C., reviewing for Tuonela Magazine, says that the band "continues its journey into all-clean-singing/rock territories with their upcoming album, “Aphelion.” The band's seventh studio effort comes on the heels of 2019's highly acclaimed “Pitfalls” and pretty much follows the same path of delivering unique and fascinating melodies that toe the line between heavy rock and synth-pop."

The Prog Report has highlighted the album's dynamic range to be "honestly astounding. For a band that developed their identity within their own sound, it’s amazing to see they can still make such a diverse album covering all their elements. From incredibly technical compositions, aggressive riffs & intricate vocal lines to deep, emotional and personal lyrics, Aphelion manages to give everything a Leprous fan would want. And not only that, it is accessible enough to new fans as a very fitting introductory album. Aphelion is a dramatic display of emotion through technical music and everything within it is executed flawlessly."

Radio Metal explains in a moderately positive review, "The fundamentals of Aphelion were developed during the previous exercise. What Leprous has achieved is an exercise in mastery. That of its formula which becomes capable of chiseling independent, varied, moving and oh so fluid pieces. All without being reduced. Aphelion takes on the appearance of a series of singles that the listener struggles to take in default. As if listening to Leprous was gradually starting to become essential. If we refuse to adhere to it, at least it deserves to be tested. Aphelion is of this caliber. Appreciating it will always depend on the effects of each individual as with any musical work; to dodge it, on the other hand, is a loophole."

It was elected by both PopMatters and Metal Hammer as the 8th best progressive metal album of 2021.

== Track listing ==
All lyrics are written by Einar Solberg, except where noted; all music is composed by Solberg, except where noted.

No.	Title	Lyrics	Music	Length
1.	"Running Low"	Tor Oddmund Suhrke, Solberg		6:36
2.	"Out of Here"			4:14
3.	"Silhouette"	Suhrke		3:45
4.	"All the Moments"		Solberg, Leprous	6:52
5.	"Have You Ever?"		Simen Børven, Solberg	4:42
6.	"The Silent Revelation"			5:42
7.	"The Shadow Side"	Suhrke, Solberg		4:29
8.	"On Hold"			7:48
9.	"Castaway Angels"		Solberg, Suhrke, Leprous	4:56
10.	"Nighttime Disguise"		Leprous	7:04
Total length:				56:10

Bonus tracks (limited edition CD, LP)
No.	Title	Lyrics	Music	Length
11.	"A Prophecy to Trust"	Suhrke	Solberg, Suhrke	2:59
12.	"Acquired Taste" (Live 2021)	Suhrke		9:09

== Personnel ==
=== Leprous ===
- Einar Solberg – vocals, keyboards, production (tracks 1–4, 6–10)
- Tor Oddmund Suhrke – guitars
- Robin Ognedal – guitars
- Simen Daniel Lindstad Børven – bass, production (track 5)
- Baard Kolstad – drums

=== Additional musicians ===
- Raphael Weinroth-Browne – cello
- Chris Baum – violin
- Blåsemafian – brass orchestra

=== Technical personnel ===
- David Castillo – recording, production (tracks 3, 6–8)
- Christer Cederberg – production (track 1)
- Anders Boska, Henning Svoren – production (tracks 4, 9, 10)
- Adam Noble – mixing
- Robin Schmidt – mastering
- Øystein Aspelund – photography
- Elena Sigida – cover artwork

== Charts ==
Chart performance for Aphelion
Chart (2021)	Peak position
Austrian Albums (Ö3 Austria)	24
Belgian Albums (Ultratop Wallonia)	102
Dutch Albums (Album Top 100)	31
Finnish Albums (Suomen virallinen lista)	11
German Albums (Offizielle Top 100)	22
Scottish Albums (OCC)	58
Swiss Albums (Schweizer Hitparade)	10
UK Rock & Metal Albums (OCC)	7
