= Bilateral (album) =

Studio album by Leprous
- Released: 22 August 2011
- Recorded: 2010–2011
- Genre: Progressive metal; alternative metal; avant-garde metal
- Length: 58:05
- Label: Inside Out Music

Leprous chronology
Tall Poppy Syndrome (2009)	Bilateral (2011)	Coal (2013)

Professional ratings
Review scores
Source	Rating
AllMusic	3.5/5 stars

Bilateral is the second studio album by Norwegian progressive metal band Leprous. It was recorded in Ivory Shoulder Studios and Juke Joint Studio by Vegard Tveitan and Heidi Solberg Tveitan, and mixed and mastered at Fascination Street Studio by Jens Bogren. Additional editing by Ivar Barstad. Art direction and design by Ritxi Ostáriz. Cover painting by Jeff Jordan. All songs published by Magic Art Publishing.

In order to define the band's vision about music and what it means to be progressive, guitarist Tor Oddmund Suhrke provided his insight on this matter and other subjects in an interview with the monthly music magazine Guitar World.

The album features guest vocals by Ihsahn on the 4th track of the album, "Thorn", and the trumpet on "Thorn" and "Painful Detour" are played by Vegard Sandbukt. Trumpet and additional keyboards were recorded in Kulturkirken Jacob, in Oslo by Rune Børø.

== Track listing ==
All lyrics are written by Tor Oddmund Suhrke

No.	Title	Music	Length
1.	"Bilateral"	Øystein Landsverk, Einar Solberg, Tor Oddmund Suhrke	4:00
2.	"Forced Entry"	Solberg, Landsverk	10:20
3.	"Restless"	Landsverk	3:30
4.	"Thorn"	Solberg, Suhrke, Landsverk	5:47
5.	"Mb. Indifferentia"	Solberg	6:33
6.	"Waste of Air"	Solberg	5:32
7.	"Mediocrity Wins"	Suhrke, Solberg	6:07
8.	"Cryptogenic Desires"	Solberg	2:45
9.	"Acquired Taste"	Solberg	5:13
10.	"Painful Detour"	Solberg, Suhrke	8:18
Total length:			58:05

== Personnel ==
Leprous

- Einar Solberg – vocals, keyboards
- Tor Oddmund Suhrke – guitars, backing vocals
- Øystein Landsverk – guitars, backing vocals
- Rein Blomquist – bass guitar
- Tobias Ørnes Andersen – drums

Other musicians

- Ihsahn – vocals on "Thorn"
- Vegard Sandbukt – trumpet on "Thorn" and "Painful Detour"
- Jens Bogren – mixing and mastering
