= The Congregation (Leprous album) =

Studio album by Leprous
- Released: 25 May 2015
- Recorded: 2014–2015
- Genres: Progressive metal; progressive rock; avant-garde metal
- Length: 65:41
- Label: Inside Out Music

Leprous chronology
Coal (2013)	The Congregation (2015)	Malina (2017)

The Congregation is the fourth studio album by Norwegian progressive metal band Leprous. The album was released on 25 May 2015 in Europe and 2 June 2015 in North America. This album was partially recorded at Fascination Street in Sweden, and the vocals developed with Heidi Solberg Tveitan and Ihsahn at Mnemosyne Studios in Norway.

It is the last album to feature longtime guitarist Øystein Landsverk, who was featured on all Leprous albums until then. It is also the first album of the band without drummer Tobias Ørnes Andersen, who was replaced with Baard Kolstad, and with Simen Daniel Børven on bass.

== Reception ==
The album was nominated for the 2015 Spellemannprisen in the "metal" category.

== Track listing ==
All lyrics are written by Tor Oddmund Suhrke, except where noted; all music is composed by Einar Solberg, except where noted.

No.	Title	Lyrics	Music	Length
1.	"The Price"		Solberg, Baard Kolstad	5:14
2.	"Third Law"		Solberg, Suhrke	6:18
3.	"Rewind"			7:07
4.	"The Flood"	Solberg, Suhrke		7:51
5.	"Triumphant"			4:25
6.	"Within My Fence"	Solberg, Suhrke	Solberg, Martin Skrebergene	3:16
7.	"Red"			6:35
8.	"Slave"			6:37
9.	"Moon"			7:13
10.	"Down"	Solberg	Solberg, Kolstad	6:26
11.	"Lower"	Solberg, Elibereth Lasombrae		4:39
Total length:				65:46

Limited Edition CD/LP bonus track
No.	Title	Music	Length
12.	"Pixel"	Solberg, Suhrke	5:16
Total length:			71:02

== Personnel ==
=== Leprous ===
- Einar Solberg – vocals, keyboards
- Tor Oddmund Suhrke – guitar
- Øystein Landsverk – guitar
- Simen Børven – bass guitar
- Baard Kolstad – drums

=== Production ===
- Jens Bogren – mixing
- Nihil – cover art

== Charts ==
Chart (2015)	Peak position
Belgian Albums (Ultratop Flanders)	167
Belgian Albums (Ultratop Wallonia)	190
Dutch Albums (Album Top 100)	66
Finnish Albums (Suomen virallinen lista)	39
German Albums (Offizielle Top 100)	78
