= Coal (Leprous album) =

Studio album by Leprous
- Released: 20 May 2013
- Recorded: 2012–2013
- Genre: Progressive metal; progressive rock; avant-garde metal
- Length: 55:45
- Label: Inside Out Music, Century Media Group

Leprous chronology
Bilateral (2011)	Coal (2013)	The Congregation (2015)

Coal is the third studio album by Norwegian progressive metal band Leprous, released on 20 May 2013.

It is the last album to feature drummer Tobias Ørnes Andersen, who was featured on all albums until then, and bassist Rein Blomquist.

== Track listing ==
All lyrics written by Tor Oddmund Suhrke, except for "The Cloak" written by Einar Solberg. All music written by Leprous.

Standard edition
No.	Title	Length
1.	"Foe"	5:15
2.	"Chronic"	7:19
3.	"Coal"	6:50
4.	"The Cloak"	4:09
5.	"The Valley"	8:59
6.	"Salt"	4:30
7.	"Echo"	9:41
8.	"Contaminate Me"	9:02
Total length:		55:45

Limited edition CD/Vinyl LP
No.	Title	Length
9.	"Bury"	4:45
10.	"Foe" (Remix)	4:02

== Personnel ==
- Einar Solberg – vocals, synthesizer, grand piano
- Tor Oddmund Suhrke – guitar, baritone guitar
- Øystein Landsverk – guitar
- Rein Blomquist – bass
- Tobias Ørnes Andersen – drums, electronic drums, additional percussions

Other musicians

- Ihsahn – string arrangement on "Chronic", guest vocals on "Contaminate Me"
- Håkon Aase – violin on "Contaminate Me"

Technical

- Vegard Tveitan, Heidi Solberg Tveitan – production
- Leprous – production, editing
- Rune Børø – grand piano and violin recording
- Jens Bogren – mixing
- Tony Lindgren – mastering
- Ritxi Ostáriz – art direction and design
- Jeff Jordan – cover art
