= Malina (album) =

Studio album by Leprous
- Released: 25 August 2017
- Recorded: 2016–2017
- Studio: Ghostward Studios, Sweden
- Genre: Progressive metal; progressive rock; art rock
- Length: 58:48
- Label: Inside Out Music
- Producer: David Castillo

Leprous chronology
| The Congregation (2015) | Malina (2017) | Pitfalls (2019) |

Singles from Malina
- 1. "From the Flame" Released: 16 June 2017; 2. "Stuck" Released: 28 July 2017; 3. "Illuminate" Released: 18 August 2017

Professional ratings
Review scores
| Source | Rating |
|---|---|
| MetalSucks | 3/5 stars |

Malina is the fifth studio album by Norwegian progressive metal band Leprous, released on 25 August 2017 through Inside Out Music.

Malina is the first album to feature Robin Ognedal on guitar, and the first not to feature former guitarist Øystein Landsverk, who left the band after 13 years.

== Promotion ==
The track listing was revealed on 16 June 2017, with lead single "From the Flame" also being released that day. On 28 July 2017 a radio edit version of the song "Stuck" was released as the album second single. A music video for the third single "Illuminate" was unveiled on 17 August 2017.

== Track listing ==
All lyrics are written by Tor Oddmund Suhrke, except where noted; all music is composed by Einar Solberg, except where noted.

| No. | Title | Lyrics | Music | Length |
|---|---|---|---|---|
| 1. | "Bonneville" | Solberg | | 5:28 |
| 2. | "Stuck" | Suhrke, Solberg | | 6:48 |
| 3. | "From the Flame" | | Solberg, Suhrke | 3:51 |
| 4. | "Captive" | | | 3:43 |
| 5. | "Illuminate" | | Solberg, Baard Kolstad | 4:21 |
| 6. | "Leashes" | | | 4:09 |
| 7. | "Mirage" | Solberg, Milica Maric | | 6:48 |
| 8. | "Malina" | Solberg | | 6:15 |
| 9. | "Coma" | | | 3:55 |
| 10. | "The Weight of Disaster" | | | 6:00 |
| 11. | "The Last Milestone" | Solberg | | 7:30 |
| Total length: | | | | 58:48 |

CD/LP only
| No. | Title | Length |
|---|---|---|
| 12. | "Root" | 4:08 |
| Total length: | | 62:56 |

== Personnel ==
=== Leprous ===
- Einar Solberg – vocals, keyboards
- Tor Oddmund Suhrke – guitars
- Robin Ognedal – guitars
- Simen Børven – bass
- Baard Kolstad – drums

=== Additional personnel ===
- Raphael Weinroth-Browne – cello, strings
- David Castillo – production
- Jens Bogren – mixing

== Charts ==
| Chart (2017) | Peak position |
|---|---|
| Austrian Albums (Ö3 Austria) | 42 |
| Belgian Albums (Ultratop Flanders) | 52 |
| Belgian Albums (Ultratop Wallonia) | 138 |
| Dutch Albums (Album Top 100) | 68 |
| Finnish Albums (Suomen virallinen lista) | 23 |
| French Albums (SNEP) | 182 |
| German Albums (Offizielle Top 100) | 34 |
| Greek Albums (IFPI) | 64 |
| Swiss Albums (Schweizer Hitparade) | 39 |
