= Citizen Brain =

Studio album by Gama Bomb
- Released: 9 June 2008
- Recorded: January–February 2008
- Genre: Thrash metal
- Length: 38:21
- Label: Earache
- Producer: Scott Atkins

Gama Bomb chronology
Survival of the Fastest (2006)	Citizen Brain (2008)	Tales from the Grave in Space (2009)

Professional ratings
Review scores
Source	Rating
Big Cheese	link
Classic Rock	link
Decibel	(6/10) link
The Irish News	(favorable) link
Kerrang!	link
Rock Sound	(7/10) link
Terrorizer	(7.5/10) link
Zero Tolerance	(4/5) link
AllMusic	link

Citizen Brain is the second album by the Irish thrash metal band Gama Bomb. It was released on 9 June 2008 in Europe and 24 June 2008 in the United States and rest of the world by Earache Records. A Bonus DVD featuring tour and studio footage was included in early pressings of the album.

== Track listing ==
All tracks were written by Gama Bomb, except "Bullet Belt" and "Space Invaders" (music by Kevy Canavan, lyrics by Gama Bomb), "Evil Voices" and "Thrashoholic" (music by Gama Bomb/Kevy Canavan, lyrics by Gama Bomb).

No.	Title	Length
1.	"Zombie Blood Nightmare"	2:38
2.	"Evil Voices"	2:34
3.	"Final Fight"	2:48
4.	"Time Crime"	2:26
5.	"Global Warning"	2:29
6.	"OCP"	0:41
7.	"Hammer Slammer"	3:18
8.	"Sentenced to Thrash"	3:12
9.	"Zombi Brew"	2:29
10.	"Hell Trucker"	2:19
11.	"Return of the Technodrome"	2:19
12.	"Thrashoholic"	2:10
13.	"In the Court of General Zod"	2:47
14.	"Space Invaders"	2:50
15.	"Bullet Belt"	3:28

== In-song references ==
Citizen Brain contains many subtle pop-culture references, with musical allusions to cult favourites The A-Team ("Final Fight"), This Is Your Life ("Sentenced to Thrash"), Mario Brothers, Tetris ("Final Fight"), Teenage Mutant Ninja Turtles ("Return of the Technodrome"), RoboCop ("OCP") and Superman ("In the Court of General Zod"). There are also lyrical references to Commando, EC Comics, Ren and Stimpy, The Twilight Zone, Final Fight, Streets of Rage and to other thrash bands.
