= An Overdose of Death... =

Studio album by Toxic Holocaust
- Released: September 2, 2008
- Recorded: May 11–20, 2008
- Genres: Thrash metal, black metal, crossover thrash
- Length: 36:34
- Label: Relapse
- Producer: Jack Endino

Toxic Holocaust chronology
Hell on Earth (2005)	An Overdose of Death... (2008)	Conjure and Command (2011)

Professional ratings
Review scores
Source	Rating
AllMusic	3/5 stars
Blabbermouth	7/10 stars
Scream Magazine	2/6 stars

An Overdose of Death... is the third full-length album released by American thrash metal band Toxic Holocaust on September 2, 2008. Music videos have been made for "Wild Dogs", "Nuke the Cross", and "The Lord of the Wasteland". These songs are all staples in the Toxic Holocaust discography. Along with "Future Shock", critical reviews mark these as the best songs of a good but mixed album. The Vocals delivered by Joel Grind are black thrash oriented. This album is the first of which the black thrash operation released on Relapse Records.

== Track listing ==
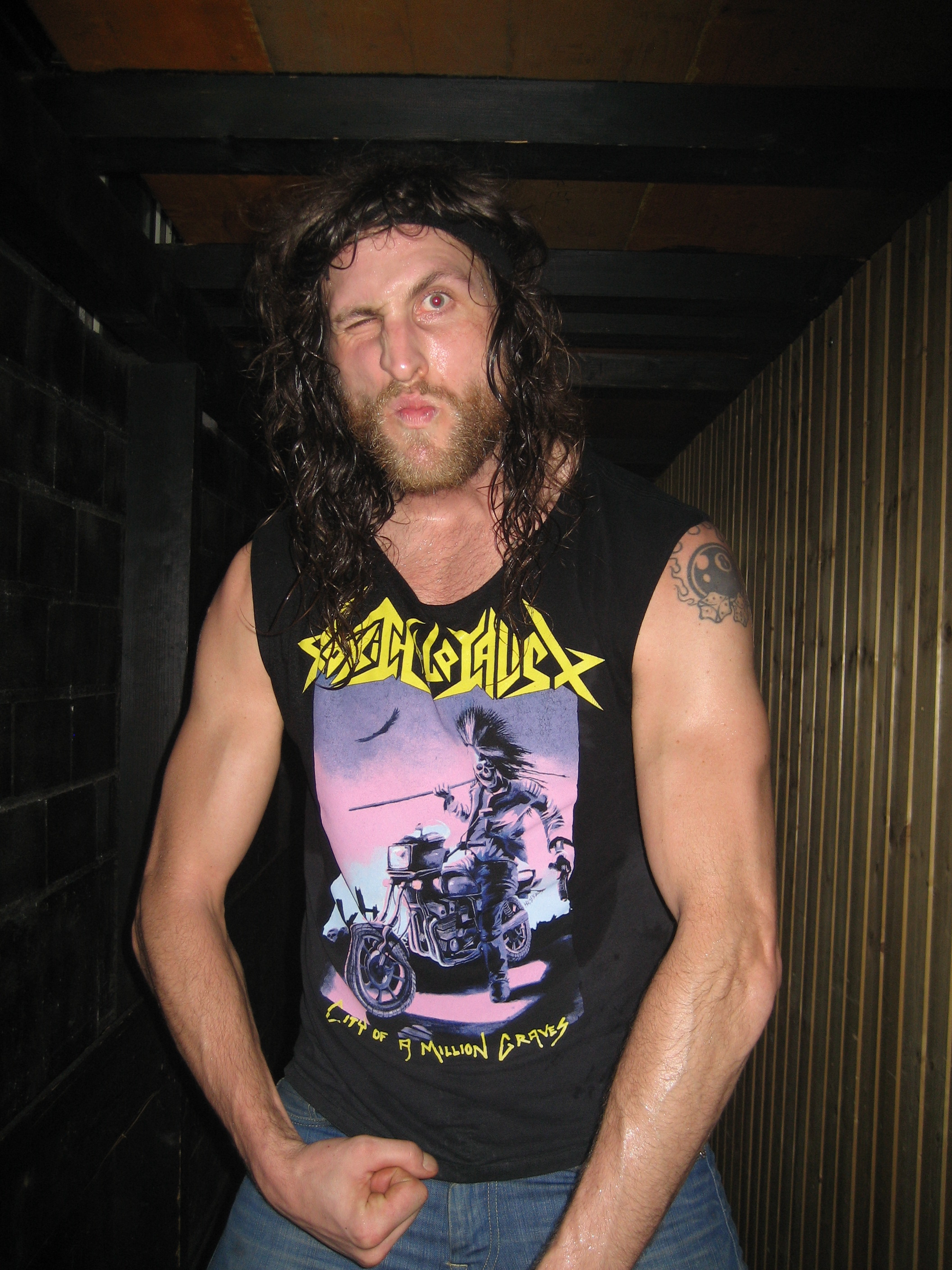
Bass guitarist Ola Flink of Soilwork wearing t-shirt Toxic Holocaust - City of a Million Graves

All songs written by Joel Grind.

No.	Title	Length
1.	"Wild Dogs"	2:18
2.	"Nuke the Cross"	2:48
3.	"Endless Armageddon"	3:15
4.	"Future Shock"	2:33
5.	"War Game"	0:59
6.	"In the Name of Science"	3:24
7.	"March from Hell"	2:53
8.	"Gravelord"	2:17
9.	"War Is Hell"	3:01
10.	"The Lord of the Wasteland"	2:48
11.	"Feedback, Blood, and Distortion"	3:27
12.	"Death from Above"	2:00
13.	"City of a Million Graves"	4:51
Total length:		36:34

- The Japanese edition includes the bonus track "666".

== Personnel ==
Toxic Holocaust

- Joel Grind - vocals, rhythm guitar, bass
- 'Personality' Paul Barke - lead guitar, production
- Donny Paycheck - drums

Production

- Jack Endino - producer
- Halseycaust - artwork
