= Untouchable Glory =

Studio album by Gama Bomb
- Released: 30 October 2015
- Genre: Thrash metal
- Length: 31:34
- Label: AFM
- Producer: Scott Atkins

Gama Bomb chronology
The Terror Tapes (2013)	Untouchable Glory (2015)	Speed Between the Lines (2018)

Untouchable Glory is the fifth studio album by Irish thrash metal band Gama Bomb. It was released internationally on 30 October 2015 via AFM Records.

== Recording and release ==
Untouchable Glory was recorded in Dublin and Omeath, Ireland & Suffolk, England over spring/summer 2015, with Scott Atkins producing. The first song taken from the album, "Ninja Untouchables / Untouchable Glory", was released on 25 September 2015 with an accompanying music video. This was followed by a second single for the track "She Thing" on 16 October.

== Artwork ==
The album cover was painted by Graham Humphreys, who had previously worked on the band's 2013 release The Terror Tapes and cover design and inlay artwork was created by long term designer Rory McGuigan. Lead singer Philly Byrne explained the concept behind the cover, saying "The theme behind this album, loosely, is exploitation cinema... the concept of the album cover being a retro movie poster. Graham Humphreys – his mainstay as an artist is recreating that vintage movie poster style for re-released classic movies. He's a portrait artist really, so we wanted to capitalise on that. Just as importantly, the sleeve and inlay was designed by Rory McGuigan. He created a separate movie poster for each track that's completely authentic to a different time, place and niche of exploitation cinema."

== Track listing ==
No.	Title	Length
1.	"Ninja Untouchables/Untouchable Glory"	2:46
2.	"Avenge Me!"	2:24
3.	"Drinkers, Inc."	3:05
4.	"My Evil Eye"	2:48
5.	"Tuck Your T-Shirt in"	3:14
6.	"Ride the Night"	2:50
7.	"She Thing"	2:11
8.	"Witching Mania"	2:30
9.	"James Joints"	0:57
10.	"Raging Skies"	3:02
11.	"I Will Haunt You"	2:56
12.	"After the Fire"	2:51

== Personnel ==
=== Gama Bomb ===
- Philly Byrne – vocals
- Paul Caffrey – drums
- Domo Dixon – guitar
- Joe McGuigan – bass
- John Roche – guitar

=== Recording personnel ===
- Scott Atkins – producer, mixing
- Domo Dixon – additional production
