= Conjure and Command =

Studio album by Toxic Holocaust
- Released: July 19, 2011
- Recorded: December 2010 in Dexter's Lab, Milford, CT
- Genres: Thrash metal, black metal, crossover thrash
- Length: 32:09
- Label: Relapse

Toxic Holocaust chronology
An Overdose of Death... (2008)	Conjure and Command (2011)	From the Ashes of Nuclear Destruction (2013)

Singles from Conjure and Command
- 1. "Revelations" Released: May 2013

Professional ratings
Review scores
Source	Rating
AllMusic	3.5/5 stars
Blabbermouth	7.5/10 stars
Austin Chronicle	3/5 stars

Conjure and Command is the fourth studio album released by American thrash metal band Toxic Holocaust, released on July 19, 2011. This is the first release featuring a full band in the studio instead of Joel Grind performing all instruments and vocals himself. The most popular songs on this album are “Bitch”, “Red Winter”, and “The Liars Are Burning”. All of which have solid riffs in perfect timing.

== Track listing ==
All songs written by Joel Grind.

No.	Title	Length
1.	"Judgment Awaits You"	1:55
2.	"Agony of the Damned"	3:59
3.	"Bitch"	2:49
4.	"Red Winter"	3:32
5.	"Nowhere to Run"	3:46
6.	"I Am Disease"	4:24
7.	"In the Depths (Of Your Mind)"	2:43
8.	"The Liars Are Burning"	2:54
9.	"Revelations"	2:50
10.	"Sound the Charge"	3:17
Total length:		32:09

== Personnel ==
Toxic Holocaust

- Joel Grind – lead vocals, guitars
- Phil Zeller – bass, backing vocals
- Nick Bellmore – drums

Additional musician

- Tim Smith – backing vocals

Production

- Daniel "Sawblade" Shaw – cover art
- Joel Grind – layout, design
- Dave Schiff – layout, design
- Dan Randall – mastering
