= Pitfalls =

- Art by Elicia Edijanto

Studio album by Leprous
- Released: 25 October 2019
- Recorded: February–July 2019
- Studio: Ghostward Studios, Stockholm, Sweden
- Genre: Art rock; progressive rock
- Length: 55:10
- Label: Inside Out Music
- Producer: David Castillo; Einar Solberg

Leprous chronology
Malina (2017)	Pitfalls (2019)	Aphelion (2021)

Singles from Pitfalls
- 1. "Below" Released: 30 August 2019; 2. "Alleviate" Released: 20 September 2019; 3. "Distant Bells" Released: 11 October 2019

Pitfalls is the sixth studio album by Norwegian progressive metal band Leprous, released on 25 October 2019 via Inside Out Music and preceded by the singles "Below", "Alleviate", and "Distant Bells". It was recorded over six months at Ghostward Studios. A cellist, violinist, and classical choir were recruited for the production. Most of the songs were written and composed by Leprous vocalist Einar Solberg.

A majority of critics approved of the album, bestowing particular esteem on the singing as well as the songs "Below", "Observe the Train", "At the Bottom", and "The Sky Is Red". Solberg's creative control was for some a point of contention. Pitfalls charted higher than its predecessor Malina in the Wallonia region of Belgium, Finland, France, the UK (rock and metal releases), and Top Heatseekers in the US.

== Production and composition ==
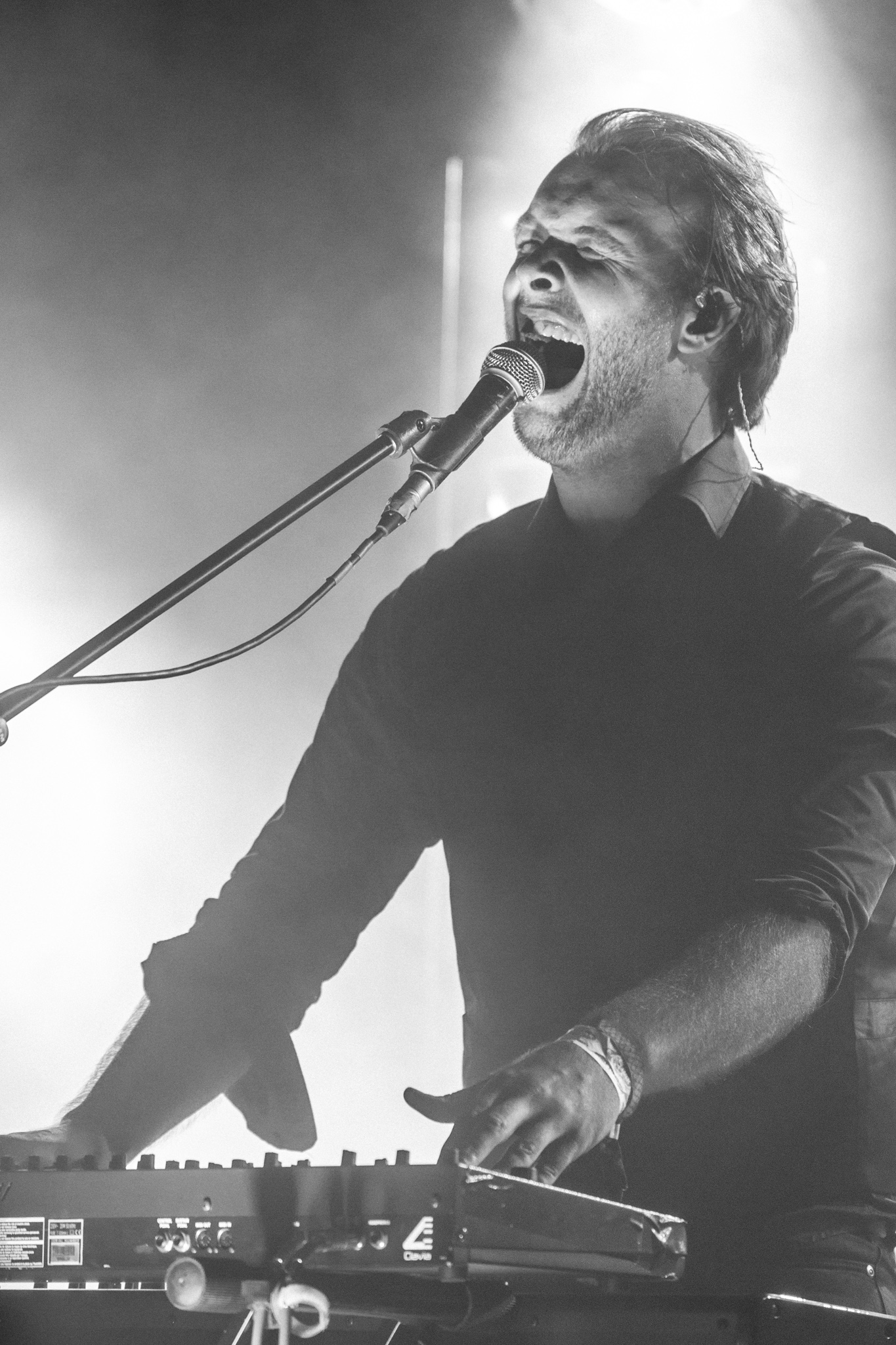
Singer Einar Solberg was the principal songwriter, contrary to previous albums.

Leprous recorded the album from February to July 2019 at Ghostward Studios in Stockholm, Sweden, with producer David Castillo and mix engineer Adam Noble, who was chosen in pursuit of a different sound. The process, unlike before, had no predetermined method or objective. Deriving from a baseline of electronic templates, the band added instruments to the initial halves of the songs and then the rest. Thirteen tracks were planned, but only nine could be completed due to time constraints. Vocalist and keyboardist Einar Solberg devoted around eighty days in studio. He intended for each take to be different, that he could avail of his favourites among them. Much of the vocals and some nylon-string guitar were done at Solberg's cabin. He saw Pitfalls as Leprous' largest production and musical departure yet, noting also that every song bears its own musical identity. His lyrics were written during a one-and-a-half-year struggle with depression and anxiety. This marked the first time Solberg was more prolific than guitarist Tor Oddmund Suhrke, who usually serves as the main lyricist. Suhrke did, however, pen "I Lose Hope", "By My Throne", and "At the Bottom". Cellist Raphael Weinroth-Browne and violinist Chris Baum contributed additional music, receiving MIDI files of their segments prior to recording. Weinroth-Browne divided his time between Canada and Sweden, travelling to Stockholm for the solos and more ambient parts, whereas Baum worked from the United States. Indonesian artist Elicia Edijanto's illustration was purchased after bassist Simen Børven showed her work to Solberg. (Note: Solberg interpreted the Buddha figure as representing mindfulness and flute player as thoughts in a person's consciousness.)

"Below" was the earliest song put in writing, originally assembled with piano and vocals. Its music video was directed by Dariusz Szermanowicz and shot in Wrocław, Poland. "I Lose Hope" was frowned upon in its infancy, but reached new potential in studio, at which point Børven and drummer Baard Kolstad applied a groove reminiscent of hip hop. "Observe the Train" endured the most iterations of the album for its desired outcome. According to Solberg, it is about the mindfulness of one's train of thoughts; the need to "stop fighting and start accepting" despair. Dissatisfied with "Alleviate", he abandoned all but the pop-based chorus chord progression and verse notes that would later be improved through vocal lines. Troll Toftenes helmed the video for the song. Weinroth-Browne inserted harmonic and pizzicato elements to "Alleviate". His solos on "At the Bottom" and "Distant Bells" were improvised. Although mostly an acoustic player, Kolstad used electronic drums on "Below", "At the Bottom", and "Distant Bells". Instrumentation for the latter was composed by Børven, drawing on the idea of creating something out of nothing with influences from his Nordic jazz and symphonic pop background. He employed a grand piano at the start to maintain intensity despite the low dynamics. Suhrke did the preliminary sketch; Solberg brought about the melodies, vocal lines, lyrics, and some arrangements. There was doubt about whether to incorporate "Foreigner", but they discovered it worked well as a passage between "Distant Bells" and the finale. A classical choir in Belgrade, Serbia, was booked for "The Sky Is Red", causing the full piece to contain hundreds of sound layers. It was almost entirely written and composed in an hour and a half, when Solberg was immersed in a flow state.

== Promotion ==
The singles "Below", "Alleviate", and "Distant Bells" debuted on 30 August, 20 September, and 11 October 2019, respectively. Pitfalls was released by Inside Out Music on 25 October as a limited mediabook CD with two bonus tracks, jewelcase CD, 2LP vinyl record including the CD, and on digital streaming platforms. Leprous began a European headlining tour in November featuring The Ocean and Port Noir. Weinroth-Browne also joined them. Kolstad performed a drum playthrough of "The Sky Is Red".

== Reception ==
Magazines Prog and PopMatters, websites Sputnikmusic and Ultimate Guitar, and drummer Mike Portnoy included Pitfalls among the best releases of 2019.

Professional ratings
Review scores
Source	Rating
Blabbermouth.net	8.5/10
Blezt	8.7/10
Sonic Perspectives	9.4/10
Sputnikmusic	4/5
ViaOmega	9.5/10

Dom Lawson, reviewing for Blabbermouth.net, beheld "Below" as evocative of "grateful tears", termed "Observe the Train" an "elegant" chamber pop waltz, and gave thanks to "The Sky Is Red" for its "feverish prog worship", "conviction and class". To Mathias Bergfjord at Blezt, the album amounted to a masterpiece of melancholic and catchy tunes, explaining that "Below" possesses all the traits that made it one of Leprous' best. He complimented the melodies on "Observe the Train" as gorgeous, the first half of "Alleviate" as seductive, and "Foreigner" as hard-hitting. Scott Medina at Sonic Perspectives declared Pitfalls to be "exquisite", taking note of Solberg's "angelic falsetto highs and powerful lower delivery". Medina praised "I Lose Hope" and "Observe the Train" for their catchy choruses and effective arrangements, thought "At the Bottom" offered thrilling dynamics, and lauded Leprous for displaying their full range on "The Sky Is Red", which he dubbed a "brilliantly enigmatic" closer. Sputnikmusic believed that the pop, dance, and electronic music successfully resulted in "something new and refreshing". Writing for ViaOmega, Uta Arnold agreed with Medina on what she thought was an "outstanding vocal performance". Commending Kolstad's drum work, she especially liked his "soft and cautious" demeanor in the slower songs. Arnold found that the downhearted parts were flawlessly expressed by the cello sounds of Weinroth-Browne. "I Lose Hope" was her favourite song, deeming it "the most enthralling", while also describing "At the Bottom" and "Foreigner" as "electrifying".

Metal Storm designated the final minutes of "At the Bottom" as the highlight of the album, appreciated the choruses on "Alleviate", and favoured "The Sky Is Red" for its rhythmic complexity, technical virtuosity, and "captivating" hooks. Tuonela Magazine's David Araneda likened the opening track to a James Bond score when alluding to the string section, which was said to complement the "warmth" of Solberg's voice. He viewed "Observe the Train" as a calming interval that boasted intriguing vocal harmonies and would lead into an "injection of energy" with "By My Throne". Araneda echoed the sentiments on "The Sky Is Red". Fraser Lewry of Louder Sound opined, "Pitfalls packs such an emotional wallop you almost fear for the health of its instigator, but it also feels joyous. The arrangements are sublime, the performances infallible. It’s an album of craft, and ambition, and absolute fearlessness".

Conversely, Sputnikmusic levied the main criticism on Solberg's dominant role and remarked that it could have been his solo album; Metal Storm did so as well, decrying the pervasive presence of vocals for relegating guitars and drums to the background and writing that "not enough of the material on Pitfalls offers up an emotionally resonant experience at the level of past work".

== Track listing ==
All lyrics are written by Einar Solberg, except where noted; all music is composed by Solberg, except where noted.

No.	Title	Lyrics	Music	Length
1.	"Below"			5:53
2.	"I Lose Hope"	Tor Oddmund Suhrke		4:44
3.	"Observe the Train"			5:08
4.	"By My Throne"	Suhrke		5:45
5.	"Alleviate"			3:42
6.	"At the Bottom"	Suhrke		7:21
7.	"Distant Bells"		Simen Børven; Solberg	7:23
8.	"Foreigner"			3:52
9.	"The Sky Is Red"			11:22
Total length:				55:10

Bonus tracks (Note: "Golden Prayers" was first released in June 2018; "Angel" followed in January 2019.)
No.	Title	Lyrics	Music	Length
10.	"Golden Prayers"	Suhrke		4:28
11.	"Angel"	Massive Attack	Massive Attack	6:27
Total length:				66:05

== Personnel ==
=== Leprous ===
- Einar Solberg – vocals, keyboards
- Tor Oddmund Suhrke – guitars
- Robin Ognedal – guitars
- Simen Daniel Lindstad Børven – bass
- Baard Kolstad – drums

=== Additional musicians ===
- Raphael Weinroth-Browne – cello
- Chris Baum – violin

=== Production and design ===
- Einar Solberg – production
- David Castillo – recording, production
- Adam Noble – mixing
- Robin Schmidt – mastering
- Elicia Edijanto – cover artwork

== Charts ==
Pitfalls performed better than 2017's Malina in Belgium (Wallonia), Finland, France, among rock and metal albums in the UK, and on Top Heatseekers in the US.

Album chart (2019)	Peak
Austria (Ö3 Austria)	61
Belgium (Ultratop Wallonia)	82
Finland (Suomen virallinen lista)	17
France (SNEP)	120
Germany (Offizielle Top 100)	36
Italy (FIMI)	98
Spain (PROMUSICAE)	62
Switzerland (Schweizer Hitparade)	46
UK Rock & Metal (OCC)	13
US Top Heatseekers (Billboard)	17
