= Melodies of Atonement =

Studio album by Leprous
- Released: 30 August 2024
- Studio: Ghostward Studios (Sweden)
- Length: 51:40
- Label: Inside Out Music
- Producer: David Castillo; Einar Solberg; Leprous

Leprous chronology
| Aphelion (2021) | Melodies of Atonement (2024) | An Evening of Atonement (2025) |

Singles from Melodies of Atonement
- 1. "Atonement" Released: 31 May 2024; 2. "Silently Walking Alone" Released: 26 June 2024; 3. "Like a Sunken Ship" Released: 14 August 2024

Melodies of Atonement is the eighth studio album by Norwegian progressive metal band Leprous, released on 30 August 2024 via Inside Out Music. The album was recorded at GhostWard Studios in Sweden. Most of the songs were written and composed by Leprous vocalist and keyboardist Einar Solberg.

== Reception ==
Professional ratings
Review scores
| Source | Rating |
|---|---|
| Blabbermouth.net | 8.5/10 |
| Metal Injection | 8.5/10 |

Dom Lawson of Blabbermouth.net said that the album "is the sound of Leprous rediscovering their potency as a living, breathing band" and "is the kind of immaculate statement that we expect, but this time Leprous are really hammering it home."

== Track listing ==
All lyrics are written by Einar Solberg, except where noted; all music is composed by Solberg, except where noted.

Melodies of Atonement track listing
| No. | Title | Lyrics | Music | Length |
|---|---|---|---|---|
| 1. | "Silently Walking Alone" | | | 4:05 |
| 2. | "Atonement" | | Einar Solberg, Simen Børven | 4:49 |
| 3. | "My Specter" | | | 3:55 |
| 4. | "I Hear the Sirens" | | | 4:31 |
| 5. | "Like a Sunken Ship" | Tor Oddmund Suhrke | | 4:04 |
| 6. | "Limbo" | | | 5:56 |
| 7. | "Faceless" | Suhrke | | 6:25 |
| 8. | "Starlight" | | Solberg, Børven | 6:09 |
| 9. | "Self-Satisfied Lullaby" | | | 6:21 |
| 10. | "Unfree My Soul" | | Robin Ognedal, Solberg | 5:21 |
| Total length: | | | | 51:40 |

Limited edition bonus track
| No. | Title | Music | Length |
|---|---|---|---|
| 11. | "Claustrophobic" | Solberg, Børven | 3:13 |

== Personnel ==
=== Leprous ===
- Einar Solberg – vocals, keyboards, production
- Tor Oddmund Suhrke – guitars
- Robin Ognedal – guitars
- Simen Daniel Lindstad Børven – bass
- Baard Kolstad – drums

=== Additional musicians ===
- Lyan Cahuac Hun – piano (tracks 7 and 10)
- John Lönnmyr – Hammond organ (track 6)

== Charts ==
Chart performance for Melodies of Atonement
| Chart (2024) | Peak position |
|---|---|
| Austrian Albums (Ö3 Austria) | 19 |
| Belgian Albums (Ultratop Flanders) | 128 |
| Dutch Albums (Album Top 100) | 85 |
| Finnish Albums (Suomen virallinen lista) | 22 |
| French Albums (SNEP) | 92 |
| German Albums (Offizielle Top 100) | 20 |
| Scottish Albums (OCC) | 89 |
| Swiss Albums (Schweizer Hitparade) | 11 |
| UK Album Downloads (OCC) | 43 |
| UK Rock & Metal Albums (OCC) | 6 |
