= Tales from the Grave in Space =

Studio album by Gama Bomb
- Released: 5 November 2009
- Recorded: September–October 2009 at Grindstone Studios in Suffolk, England
- Genre: Thrash metal
- Length: 30:56
- Label: Earache
- Producer: Scott Atkins

Gama Bomb chronology
Citizen Brain (2008)	Tales from the Grave in Space (2009)	The Terror Tapes (2013)

Tales from the Grave in Space is the third studio album by Irish thrash metal band Gama Bomb, and one of the first albums ever to be released as a free download by a signed band. In a partnership between the band and record label Earache Records, the album was available for free download from 5 November 2009, hosted by RapidShare. It was physically released on 25 January in the UK and Europe and the US on 8 March.

== Artwork ==
The album cover was created by Jeff Jordan, known for his work with The Mars Volta. He took inspiration from classic pulp and sci-fi artists like Virgil Finlay, and the themes of 1950s horror comics like Tales from the Crypt. It was then designed into an album cover by Rory McGuigan, who styled it after a Hammer Horror movie poster.

The cover's concept was created by frontman Philly Byrne, based on the Lost Cosmonauts conspiracy theory. The cover of the album shows a skeletal cosmonaut, attached by living tentacles to a vast, abstract piece of masonry – the titular Grave – in space. Byrne described the artwork as a "sort of 'Doctor Who-meets-Arthur C. Clarke' thing [about] an alien object that absorbs whatever it encounters."

The album's inlay was designed by Rory McGuigan, imitating the pre-Comics Code Authority horror and fantasy comics of the 1950s.

Tales from the Grave in Space is dedicated to the memory of late Evile bassist Mike Alexander.

== Promotion ==
Gama Bomb released Tales from the Grave in Space as a free download available from Earache Records website on 5 November 2009, hosted by RapidShare, in one of the first official deals between a band and the one-click hosting website. Radiohead used a similar release method on their seventh studio album, In Rainbows, which was released through the band's own website on 10 October 2007 as a digital download for which customers could make whatever payment that they wished, including nothing. Significantly, Gama Bomb had the backing of Earache Records to release the record via RapidShare, a site often considered to be a threat to the music industry as it allows users to anonymously upload files for download.

Gama Bomb frontman Philly Byrne, a self-proclaimed fan of file sharing, said, "We're giving the album away for free as a natural progression. It's an open-handed gesture that reflects the room the download revolution has created in the music business [...] taking away the many restrictions of a physical-only traditional release opens us up to a new and wider audience. More people will hear the music and enjoy it and talk about it, and if that leads to them helping us out by buying a t-shirt or coming to a show, so be it."

In an apparent vindication of this decision, bassist Joe McGuigan has said that despite it already being given away for free online, the physical copy of the album actually sold more than copies than the band's previous album Citizen Brain.

== Reception ==
Professional ratings
Review scores
Source	Rating
AllMusic	3/5 stars
Metal Hammer	7/10 stars
Kerrang!	4/5 stars
Terrorizer	8/10 stars
Big Cheese	4/5 stars

Tales from the Grave in Space was well received by critics and fans like, with Kerrang! magazine awarding it four Ks and Metal Hammer magazine giving it a rating of 7/10. Due to the novel nature of the album's release, advance review copies were not made available to journalists.

== Pop culture references ==
Tales from the Grave in Space's lyrics and lead guitar work reference Withnail & I, the "Amok Time" battle music from Star Trek, D.A.R.Y.L., video game The Last Ninja and Don't Look Now among many others. The track "We Respect You" features mentions of High Spirits, Steve Guttenberg, singer Tane McClure and actors Michael Biehn, Michael J. Fox, Ronny Cox, Christopher Lee, Kurt Russell, Gary Busey, Christopher Walken, Christopher Lloyd, Peter Falk, Jean-Claude Van Damme and Bill Paxton as well as directors John Hughes, John Carpenter and Bruno Mattei.

== Half Cut ==
On the album's physical release in January 2010 a limited edition double CD version featured the bonus EP Half Cut, an Irish slang term meaning 'drunk'. The five track EP features material recorded during and after the Tales From The Grave In Space sessions, was produced by Scott Atkins and engineered by Morgan Dunne.

== Track listing ==
=== Tales from the Grave in Space ===
No.	Title	Length
1.	"Slam Anthem"	2:34
2.	"New Eliminators of Atlantis B.C."	3:05
3.	"Three Witches"	2:39
4.	"Last Ninjas Unite"	2:16
5.	"Escape from Scarecrow Mountain"	2:35
6.	"Mussolini Mosh"	1:12
7.	"We Respect You"	2:28
8.	"Apocalypse 1997"	2:32
9.	"Return to Blood Castle"	2:43
10.	"Polterghost"	2:50
11.	"Skeletron"	3:08
12.	"Mummy Invasion"	2:48

=== Half Cut ===
No.	Title	Length
1.	"Cellar Dweller"	2:08
2.	"Deep Red"	2:56
3.	"Curry Chip"	0:47
4.	"Welcome Back to Life"	2:12
5.	"Exhumed Maniac"	3:23
