= Chemistry of Consciousness =

Studio album by Toxic Holocaust
- Released: October 25, 2013
- Recorded: 2013
- Studios: GodCity Studios, Audiosiege Engineering
- Genres: Thrash metal, black metal, crossover thrash
- Length: 28:05
- Label: Relapse

Toxic Holocaust chronology
From the Ashes of Nuclear Destruction (2013)	Chemistry of Consciousness (2013)	Primal Future: 2019 (2019)

Singles from Chemistry of Consciousness
- 1. "Out of the Fire" Released: October 1, 2013

Chemistry of Consciousness is the fifth studio album by American thrash metal band Toxic Holocaust, released on October 25, 2013.

== Track listing ==
All tracks are written by Toxic Holocaust.

No.	Title	Length
1.	"Awaken the Serpent"	1:38
2.	"Silence"	2:12
3.	"Rat Eater"	3:42
4.	"Salvation Is Waiting"	2:49
5.	"Out of the Fire"	2:53
6.	"Acid Fuzz"	2:31
7.	"Deny the Truth"	2:18
8.	"Mkultra"	2:07
9.	"I Serve..."	2:30
10.	"International Conspiracy"	2:32
11.	"Chemistry of Consciousness"	2:53
Total length:		28:05

Bonus track
No.	Title	Length
12.	"Wargasm" (L7 cover)	2:37
Total length:		30:42

== Personnel ==
Toxic Holocaust

- Joel Grind - guitars, lead vocals
- Phil Zeller - bass, backing vocals
- Nick Bellmore - drums

Production

- Kurt Ballou - mixing
- Brad Boatright - mastering
