= Primal Future: 2019 =

Studio album by Toxic Holocaust
- Released: October 4, 2019
- Genre: Thrash metal
- Length: 39:22
- Label: E1 Music

Toxic Holocaust chronology
| Chemistry of Consciousness (2013) | Primal Future: 2019 (2019) |

Singles from Primal Future: 2019
- 1. "Chemical Warlords" Released: August 13, 2019

Professional ratings
Review scores
| Source | Rating |
|---|---|
| Blabbermouth.net | 8/10 |
| KNAC.com | 3.5/5 |
| Metal Hammer | 6/7 |
| Powermetal.de | 8/10 |
| Punknews.org | 4/5 |
| The Rockpit | 10/10 |

Primal Future: 2019 is the sixth studio album by American thrash metal band Toxic Holocaust, released on October 4, 2019.

"Chemical Warlords" was released as a single on August 13, 2019. A music video for "New World Beyond" was released on February 28, 2020.

== Critical reception ==
Blabbermouth.net concluded: "If you want progress, look elsewhere. But if you want to hear some real deal blood 'n' thunder that would make Lemmy glow with paternal pride, Joel Grind is still the man to provide it." Metal Hammer remarked that Grind's vocals in "Cybernetic War" are reminiscent of the band Running Wild. Powermetal.de called the album an enormously entertaining and enjoyable experience. The Rockpit wrote: "[...] if you love your metal fun and heavy, slick but raw and just so goddamn good in all areas, you just can’t go wrong with this album." KNAC.com highlighted "Time's Edge" as a great track that has "some versatility with harmonics". Punknews.org said "It’s an album that can hold its own against the band’s best material."

== Track listing ==
Primal Future: 2019 track listing
| No. | Title | Length |
|---|---|---|
| 1. | "Chemical Warlords" | 4:53 |
| 2. | "Black Out the Code" | 4:56 |
| 3. | "New World Beyond" | 4:14 |
| 4. | "Deafened by the Roar" | 1:30 |
| 5. | "Time's Edge" | 4:16 |
| 6. | "Primal Future" | 4:32 |
| 7. | "Iron Cage" | 4:01 |
| 8. | "Controlled by Fear" | 2:28 |
| 9. | "Aftermath" | 3:05 |
| 10. | "Cybernetic War" | 5:27 |
