= Tall Poppy Syndrome (album) =

Studio album by Leprous
- Released: 5 May 2009
- Recorded: August 2008
- Genre: Progressive metal; technical death metal; avant-garde metal; alternative metal
- Length: 63:00
- Label: Sensory Records

Leprous chronology
Aeolia (2006)	Tall Poppy Syndrome (2009)	Bilateral (2011)

Professional ratings
Review scores
Source	Rating
About.com	4.5/5 stars
AllMusic.com	3.5/5 stars

Tall Poppy Syndrome is the debut studio album by Norwegian progressive metal band Leprous. It was recorded and mixed at Black Lounge Studio/The Abyss by Jonas Kjellgren, mastered at West West Side by Alan Douches.

== Track listing ==
No.	Title	Lyrics	Music	Length
1.	"Passing"	Tor Oddmund Suhrke	Suhrke, Einar Solberg, Øystein Landsverk	8:31
2.	"Phantom Pain"	Halvor Strand	Solberg, Suhrke	6:50
3.	"Dare You"	Suhrke	Landsverk, Solberg	6:45
4.	"Fate"	Suhrke	Suhrke	4:38
5.	"He Will Kill Again"	Strand	Solberg	7:31
6.	"Not Even a Name"	Strand	Solberg, Suhrke	8:46
7.	"Tall Poppy Syndrome"	Suhrke	Landsverk, Solberg, Suhrke, Tobias Ørnes Andersen	8:28
8.	"White"	Strand	Landsverk, Solberg	11:31
Total length:				63:00

== Personnel ==
- Einar Solberg – lead vocals, keyboards
- Tor Oddmund Suhrke – guitars, backing vocals
- Øystein Landsverk – guitars, backing vocals
- Halvor Strand – bass
- Tobias Ørnes Andersen – drums
