= Survival of the Fastest =

Studio album by Gama Bomb
- Released: September 1, 2005
- Recorded: July – December, 2004
- Genre: Thrash metal, speed metal
- Length: 29:16; 34:00 (bonus tracks)
- Label: Witches Brew
- Producer: Gama Bomb

Gama Bomb chronology
| Survival of the Fastest (2005) | Citizen Brain (2008) |

Survival of the Fastest is the first album by the Irish thrash metal band Gama Bomb. The album was released on the European music label Witches Brew in 2006, after an initial 2005 self-release.

== Track listing ==
All lyrics and music written by Gama Bomb except "Bullet Belt" (music by Kevy Canavan, lyrics by Gama Bomb).

| No. | Title | Length |
|---|---|---|
| 1. | "Zombie Creeping Flesh" | 2:42 |
| 2. | "Steel Teeth (The Metal Jaw)" | 2:46 |
| 3. | "Zombie Kommand" | 2:50 |
| 4. | "Atomizer" | 3:13 |
| 5. | "Fortified Zone" | 2:15 |
| 6. | "Racists!" | 3:33 |
| 7. | "Scientists?" | 2:39 |
| 8. | "Hell Trucker" | 2:49 |
| 9. | "Nuke the Skeets" | 0:14 |
| 10. | "Skellington Crew" | 3:06 |
| 11. | "Bullet Belt" | 3:50 |

=== Bonus tracks ===
12. "The Survival Option" – 2:11
13. "M.A.D." – 2:34

These were originally released on the band's 2004 single "The Fatal Mission" and were not included on the 2005 limited-release version of the album.

== Band members ==
- Philly Byrne – lead vocals
- Joe McGuigan – bass guitar and backing vocals
- Luke Graham – rhythm guitar
- Kevy Canavan – lead guitar
- Ronan Fitzpatrick – drums
- Damien Boyce – drums on "M.A.D" and "The Survival Option"

== Production ==
- Alwyn Walker - engineer
- Darrell Walker - mastering
- David Watson - album cover art
- Rory McGuigan - album design
