= Gama Bomb =

Thrash metal band based in Northern Ireland

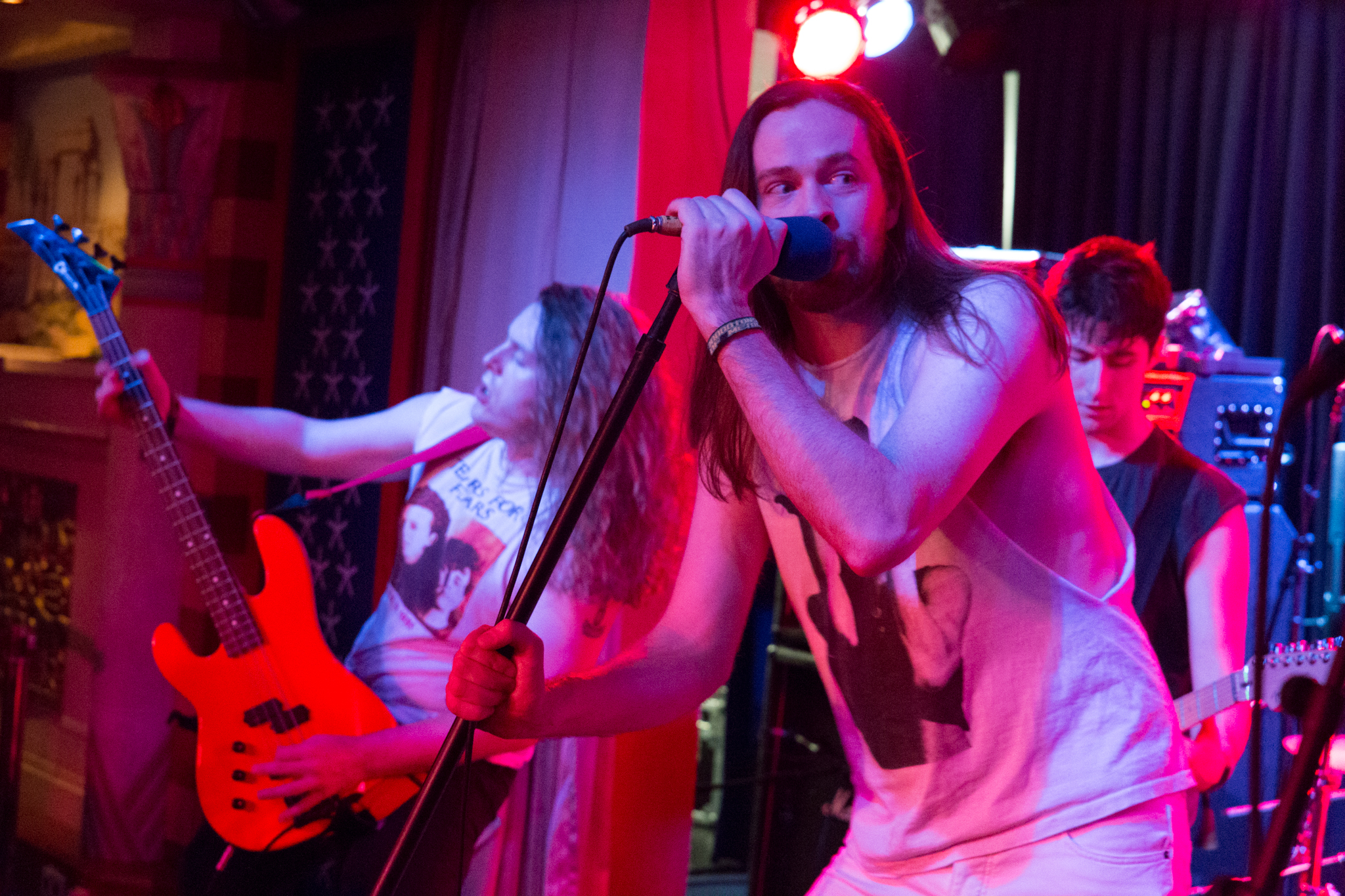
- Gamma Bomb at 70000 Tons of Metal 2015

Background information
- Origin: Newry, Northern Ireland
- Genre: Thrash metal
- Years active: 2002–present
- Labels: Earache, AFM, Prosthetic
- Members: Philly Byrne; Joe McGuigan; John Roche; Domo Dixon; Chris Williams
- Past members: Paul Caffrey; Luke Graham
- Website: gamabomb.net

Gama Bomb are a thrash metal band based in Northern Ireland. The band's 2009 album Tales from the Grave in Space was one of the first released as a free download by a band signed to a record label.

== History ==
=== Beginnings (2002–2005) ===
Joe McGuigan and Philly Byrne formed Gama Bomb with guitarist Luke Graham in Newry in 2002. The band gained attention with their demo The Survival Option that year. In 2003, they toured and released the single "The Fatal Mission". During this period, Byrne appeared on stage as a chef, priest, pirate, or scientist. Gama Bomb's first tour dates outside Ireland were in 2004, supporting punk band The Dangerfields on a tour of Scotland.

=== Debut album and search for label (2005–2007) ===
Gama Bomb released a full-length album, Survival of the Fastest, independently in 2005 and then through Witches Brew in early 2006. At this point, original guitarist Kevy Canavan departed and drummer Paul Caffrey joined the band. In late 2005, Domo Dixon filled the vacant guitar spot. In April 2006, as the album was commercially released, Gama Bomb embarked on the "Insane Quest for Flesh" tour, their first UK tour, supported by Mutant and Deceptor.

The album and tour gained them coverage in NME and Terrorizer, and Gama Bomb self-recorded a demo of their new album Citizen Brain, seeking a larger label to help them tour Europe. Earache Records took interest in the band. In May 2007, Gama Bomb joined the Hungarian thrash band Black Sister on a split 7-inch EP released by Problem? Records. The Gama Bomb side had new tracks "Zombi Brew" (from the Citizen Brain demo) and "Frightmare On Hell St.", together with a cover of the punk band The Dangerfields' song, "Maniac". The EP was released exclusively on 7-inch vinyl and limited to 200 copies.

=== Earache and Citizen Brain: 2008–2009 ===
In September 2007, Gama Bomb signed a recording contract with Earache Records. The band contributed the song "Zombi Brew" to Thrashing Like A Maniac, a compilation released by Earache that included other then-new thrash artists such as Evile, Municipal Waste, Mutant (London), Short Sharp Shock and Send More Paramedics.

In July 2008, Earache released Citizen Brain, and the band toured Europe extensively to support the album. The band became vocal in its support of music downloading, and led a campaign to 'Stamp Out Inferior Metal', asking fans to bring along CDs they regret buying and to destroy them at shows.

In summer 2009, the band played mainstage bookings at the European metal festivals Hellfest in France and Tuska Open Air in Finland alongside Mötley Crüe, WASP, Anthrax and Suicidal Tendencies.

In January 2009, Gama Bomb were voted best newcomer in a Terrorizer readers' poll. Also in early 2009, the band toured Europe with Exodus and Overkill as part of the Killfest tour.

=== Tales from the Grave in Space (2009–2011) ===
Gama Bomb announced via their MySpace blog in August 2009 that they were returning to the studio to record their third album, Tales from the Grave in Space, for a November 2009 release. The album was produced by Scott Atkins, who had produced Citizen Brain.

On 8 September the band announced that Tales from the Grave in Space would be released online, completely free, on 5 November via RapidShare, making them the first metal band to release a free album while signed to a record label. Issue 200 of the UK version of Metal Hammer, sold in branches of Tesco, came with a copy of the CD as a cover mount. A physical version of the album was later released, and bassist Joe McGuigan reported that despite the album having already being given away for free, Tales from the Grave in Space actually outsold Citizen Brain physically.

In 2010, Gama Bomb was nominated in the Best Underground Band category of the Metal Hammer Golden Gods Awards but lost to Immortal. In July they supported Sepultura on a UK tour, and in the autumn they embarked on their first US tour, supporting Overkill, Forbidden and DRI. The band toured extensively in 2011 as well, with two shows in Mexico in May, a UK tour in September, a European tour in October, and their first South American show in December while supporting Dark Funeral in Brazil.

=== The Terror Tapes (2012–2015) ===
In March 2012, the band revealed via Facebook that vocalist Byrne had undergone surgery for vocal fold nodules, sustained over the last year's touring, and was recovering from the procedure. During this period the band played a show in Enschede, Netherlands, with McGuigan filling in for Byrne as the vocalist. On 3 April, the band announced that founding member Graham was leaving amicably after 10 years on rhythm guitar. John Roche of Slave Zero, who played with the band on tour in 2011, was selected to replace him. In July 2012, the band celebrated its tenth anniversary with two shows in Belfast and Dublin, reuniting on stage with the former guitarists Canavan and Graham for greatest-hits sets.

The band's fourth album, The Terror Tapes was released on AFM Records on 19 April 2013 in Europe and 22 April in the UK and Ireland, followed by a US release on 7 May. The album was recorded in Dublin and Suffolk and produced by the band's long-time producer, Scott Atkins. The cover featured art by the veteran horror movie poster artist Graham Humphreys, whose work includes posters for A Nightmare on Elm Street and Evil Dead.

The first single, "'Terrorscope", was released as a free download on 26 March, followed by a 7-inch vinyl maxi-single. Byrne said of the single's free release: "It was really important to us to give people some music for nothing. It's how we get our music and we want people to know we're cool with them doing that, as long as they support us. Support comes from a lot of different places, not just the front pocket." The video for Terrorscope was released on 20 March.

To support the album, the band undertook the 'Speed of Sound' European tour with Artillery and Brazilian band Torture Squad in May, before playing a series of summer festivals.

=== Untouchable Glory (2015–2018) ===
Gama Bomb released Untouchable Glory on 30 October 2015, with a launch gig at London's Camden Underworld on Halloween night. Untouchable Glory was recorded in Dublin and Omeath, Ireland, and Suffolk, England, over spring and summer 2015, with Scott Atkins again producing.

The first song taken from the album 'Ninja Untouchables / Untouchable Glory' was released on 25 September 2015 with an accompanying music video. This was followed by a second single for the track 'She Thing' on 16 October. In preparation for the album, Byrne attended opera singing lessons in London as rehabilitation for his 2013 vocal surgery. The first song taken from the album 'Ninja Untouchables / Untouchable Glory' was released on 25 September 2015 with an accompanying music video. This was followed by a second single for the track 'She Thing' on 16 October. 2016 found the band touring throughout South America as well as headlining shows in Ireland and Europe.

=== Speed Between the Lines and Sea Savage (2018–2021) ===
In March 2018 Gama Bomb returned to Scott Atkins's Grindstone studios in England to begin work on their sixth album, Speed Between the Lines. Work would be undertaken on and off during the year as the band planned to mark the 10th anniversary of their Citizen Brain album with a series of European dates in the summer. Speed Between the Lines was released in October 2018 and was preceded by the 7-inch single and video for "Bring out the Monster", introducing the band's mascot, Snowy The Gamabombinable Snowman.

In November 2019 the band played their first shows in Asia with two concerts at Japanese Assault Fest in Tokyo.

In January 2020, the band announced the amicable departure of drummer Paul Caffrey after 15 years with the band.

In May 2020, Gama Bomb announced their signing to Prosthetic Records and released Living For The Lockdown, a standalone single in support of Irish homelessness charity Dublin Simon Community.

The band would spend most of 2020 Self-producing their seventh album Sea Savage in isolation due to the COVID-19 pandemic, with Vader and Decapitated drummer James Stewart guesting. The album was produced by guitarist Domo Dixon, mixed by Zack Ohren (Testament, Carcass) and was released on 4 December 2020. The album's art was once again created by Graham Humphreys, and featured a redesigned version of the band's mascot, Snowy.

The lead single Sea Savage featured a music video shot on location at Fanad lighthouse in County Donegal, referencing the 2019 film The Lighthouse. Singles Sheer Khan and Lords of the Hellfire Club followed.

=== Bats (2023–present) ===
2020 saw the addition of former Shrapnel drummer, Chris Williams join the band as their touring drummer, completing the line up once more.

In 2023, the band released a single of a folk cover featuring the singer "Spider Stacy" from Irish band The Pogues, it was the first piece of "new" material since 2020 and is unknown if there will be a new album.

On September 11, 2023, the band released a new single, "Speed Funeral", and announced their upcoming album, Bats, would be released on November 10.

On September 3, 2024, it was announced that former Shrapnel drummer Chris Williams was officially a member of the band having been the touring drummer since 2020. Chris finished up with Shrapnel at the end of 2024.

== Snowy 'The Gamabombinable Snowman' ==
The band make use of their own mascot - depicted as a humanoid 'yeti' monster - on their merchandise, music videos and album art. The character was introduced in the 2018 song and music video for Bring Out The Monster, making its first appearance on an album sleeve with 2020's Sea Savage. The figure of Snowy was key to the concept of Sea Savage, which was presented as a Victorian stage play about the band voyaging in search of the yeti. Snowy makes on-stage appearances as part of Gama Bomb's stage shows.

== Musical style and lyrical themes ==
Stylistically rooted in 1980s thrash metal the band has stated that its influences include acts such as Nuclear Assault, Kreator, Agent Steel, Sodom, old Slayer and early Megadeth. AllMusic labelled their music as punk metal (crossover thrash).

Gama Bomb's lyrics often refer to the horror, action and science fiction movies, cartoons and computer games of the 1980s, as well as paying tribute to many classic heavy metal themes. They also write topical songs on social issues like racism and global warming. The band is known for injecting its own sense of humour into its lyrics, with bizarre song concepts which lampoon classic thrash metal topics.

== Members ==
- Philly Byrne – vocals (2002–present)
- Domo Dixon – lead guitar (2005–present)
- John Roche – rhythm guitar (2012–present)
- Joe McGuigan – bass (2002–present)
- Chris Williams – touring (2020–2024) drums (2024-present)

=== Past members ===
- Steve Campbell – lead guitar (2002)
- Kevy Canavan – lead guitar (2002–2005)
- Luke Graham – rhythm guitar (2002–2012)
- Damien Boyce – drums (2002–2004)
- Ronan Fitzpatrick – drums (2004–2005)
- Paul Caffrey – drums (2005–2020)

== Discography ==
=== Studio albums ===
- Survival of the Fastest (2006)
- Citizen Brain (2008)
- Tales from the Grave in Space (2009)
- The Terror Tapes (2013)
- Untouchable Glory (2015)
- Speed Between the Lines (2018)
- Sea Savage (2020)
- Bats (2023)

=== Singles and EPs ===
- "The Survival Option" (2002)
- "The Fatal Mission" (2004)
- "Zombi Brew" (2007)
- "Half Cut" (2010)
- Terrorscope (2013)
- Give Me Leather (2018)
- Living for the Lockdown (2020)
- Thunder Over London (2021)
- Necronomicon Automaton (2025)

=== Compilation contributions ===
- Thrashing Like a Maniac (2007)
