= Evil Never Dies =

Studio album by Toxic Holocaust
- Released: October 1, 2003
- Genres: Thrash metal, black metal, crossover thrash
- Length: 32:11
- Labels: Witches Brew; Relapse Records

Toxic Holocaust chronology
| Evil Never Dies (2003) | Toxic Thrash Metal (2004) |

2010 Reissue Cover
- 2010 Relapse Records reissue cover

Professional ratings
Review scores
| Source | Rating |
|---|---|
| AllMusic | 3.5/5 stars |
| Blabbermouth | 7.5/10 stars |
| Scream Magazine | 3/6 stars |

Evil Never Dies is the debut studio album of thrash metal band Toxic Holocaust. It was re-released in 2010 along with Hell on Earth to general critical approval.

== Track listing ==
| No. | Title | Length |
|---|---|---|
| 1. | "Evil Never Dies" | 1:20 |
| 2. | "War Is Hell" | 3:23 |
| 3. | "Enemy of Jesus" | 2:54 |
| 4. | "Damned to Fire" | 2:03 |
| 5. | "Exxxecutioner" | 3:16 |
| 6. | "666" | 2:08 |
| 7. | "Summon the Beast" | 4:28 |
| 8. | "Demise" | 1:38 |
| 9. | "Warfare" | 1:44 |
| 10. | "Dead to the World" | 2:43 |
| 11. | "Fallout" | 3:18 |
| 12. | "Atomik Destruktor" | 3:16 |
| Total length: | | 32:11 |

== Personnel ==
- Joel Grind - vocals, guitar, bass, drums
