= Aeolia (album) =

Demo album by Leprous
- Released: 2006
- Genres: Progressive metal; experimental rock; progressive death metal; jazz fusion
- Length: 65:56

Leprous chronology
Silent Waters (2004)	Aeolia (2006)	Tall Poppy Syndrome (2009)

Aeolia is the second demo album by Norwegian progressive metal band Leprous, released in 2006. It was recorded and mixed at Symfonique and Juke Joint Studio by Mnemosyne. Art Design by Bjørn Tore Moen. Although a self-released demo, it is occasionally regarded as the band's first full-length album due to the running time being longer than that of most other Leprous recordings.

== Track listing ==
All lyrics are written by Halvor Strand; all music is composed by Leprous.

No.	Title	Length
1.	"Disclosure"	11:03
2.	"Black Stains"	4:49
3.	"Last Word"	3:20
4.	"Aeolus Shadow"	7:15
5.	"The Great Beast"	8:06
6.	"Indecisive"	6:25
7.	"Close Your Heart"	11:02
8.	"Deformed Beauty"	1:17
9.	"Eye of the Storm"	10:56
Total length:		64:13

== Personnel ==
- Einar Solberg – synth, vocals
- Tor Oddmund Suhrke – guitar, vocals
- Øystein Landsverk – guitar, backing vocals
- Halvor Strand – bass
- Tor Stian Borhaug – drums
