= Vex =

Vex or VEX may refer to:

== Technology ==
- VEX prefix, a microprocessor opcode prefix and coding scheme for the x64 and x86 instruction set architecture
- Vex, a scripting language in the software Houdini
- Venus Express, a European Space Agency space mission to the planet Venus
- Vex, a suborbital test Tronador rocket in development by Argentina
- VEX Robotics, a robotics program for elementary through university students
- Vulnerability Exploitability eXchange, an industry standard for describing software vulnerabilities and their exploitability.

== Fiction ==
- Voltayre's Encyclopedia Xenobiologica, a fictional guide to the 1994 Babylon 5 universe
- Vex, a character in the 2010 Canadian television series Lost Girl
- Vex, a character in the 2011 video game Darkspore
- Vex, a character in the 2011 video game The Elder Scrolls V: Skyrim
- The Vex, a race of semi-organic machines and one of the four alien enemy factions found in the 2014 video game Destiny
- Vex'ahlia "Vex" de Rolo, a half-elven ranger / rogue character in the 2015 American web series Critical Role where professional voice actors play the role-playing game Dungeons & Dragons
- Vex, a mob from Minecraft summoned by Evokers.
- Vex, The Gloomist, a playable champion character in the MOBA video game League of Legends
- Vex (Ninjago), a character in Ninjago

== Other uses ==
- Vex (album), by Steel Pulse
- Vex, Switzerland, a municipality
- Ulorin Vex, English model
- Vex (brachiopod), a brachiopod genus; See List of brachiopod genera
- Virgin Express, a European airline, now merged into Brussels Airlines

== See also ==
- VEX Robotics Competition, a robotics competition
- FIRST Vex Challenge, another robotics competition
- Z.Vex Effects, a US effects pedal company founded by Zachary Vex
  - Z.Vex Fuzz Factory, a brand of fuzz box used for musical effects
