= Vexed (Italian band) =

Italian metal band

Vexed is an Italian thrash metal band. They released five albums.

== Select discography ==
- Endless Armageddon (2001)
- Nightmare Holocaust (2003, Witches Brew)
- Destruction Warfare (2004, Witches Brew)
- Hellblast Extinction (2006)
- Void MMXII (2012, Punishment 18 Records)
- Legion Deathblood (2016, Punishment 18 Records)
