= Jeff Jordan (painter) =

American surrealist painter

- Born: 1948 (age 77–78)
- Known for: The Mars Volta album cover art
- Style: Surrealism
- Website: Official website

Jeff Jordan (born c. 1948) is an American surrealism painter in Eureka, California. He is best known for painting several of The Mars Volta's album covers, including for The Bedlam in Goliath.

== Early life ==
To avoid being drafted into the Vietnam War and sent to Southeast Asia, Jordan joined the American Air Force in 1966 and was stationed in Iceland before returning to the United States and working as a missile guard at Vandenberg Air Force Base.

== Career ==
Jordan's interests vary widely and he has explored a wide range of art styles; as such, it took him 25 years to settle on his surrealist style. His work is done by hand with acrylic and oil paints. After years of working as a commercial artist who felt uninspired by his commissions, he teamed up with The Mars Volta for their album Amputechture (2006). The cover is Jordan's painting Big Mutant, while Dwarf Dancing is on the CD face and LP labels. Agadez was used as the cover art for The Bedlam in Goliath (2008) and was also the name of the album's eighth track. Rolling Stones readers chose this as the second best album cover of 2008. The band's fifth studio album, Octahedron, features Jordan's artwork on the front and back covers as well as throughout the LP packaging. He has also created t-shirts and live backdrops for the band.

== Album artwork credits ==
=== The Mars Volta ===
- Amputechture (2006)
- Wax Simulacra (2007)
- The Bedlam in Goliath (2008)
- Octahedron (2009)

=== Gama Bomb ===
- Tales from the Grave in Space (2009)

=== Leprous ===
- Bilateral (2011)
- Coal (2013)

=== Protest the Hero ===
- Volition (2013)

=== Graham Czach ===
- Lucid (2010)
