= The Terror Tapes =

Studio album by Gama Bomb
- Released: 19 April 2013
- Genre: Thrash metal
- Label: AFM
- Producer: Scott Atkins

Gama Bomb chronology
Tales from the Grave in Space (2009)	The Terror Tapes (2013)	Untouchable Glory (2015)

Singles from The Terror Tapes
- 1. "Terrorscope" Released: 26 March 2013 (free download) April 2012 (vinyl)

The Terror Tapes is the fourth studio album by Irish thrash metal band Gama Bomb. It was released on 19 April 2013 in Europe and 7 May in the US via AFM Records.

== Background ==
The Terror Tapes was recorded in Dublin, Ireland and Suffolk, UK by Scott Atkins (Cradle of Filth, Stamping Ground) over autumn and winter 2012. The band had suffered throat surgery, tendon injury and the loss of original member Luke Graham before recording began. Before signing to AFM lead singer Philly Byrne said "We recorded without a label, did it all the hard way. We've spent long enough in the shadows; now we're ready to re-emerge"

== Release ==
The first single, "Terrorscope", was released as a free download on 26 March 2013 and released on limited edition vinyl in April 2013. The album followed on 19 April 2013 in Europe and on 7 May 2013 in the US.

== Artwork ==
The album cover was created by Graham Humphreys, best known for classic horror movie posters including A Nightmare on Elm Street and Evil Dead. Lead singer Philly Byrne said of the collaboration "We grew up in terror of VHS covers painted by Graham, but we never knew his name. We found him, had the audacity to chat to him, and now it's a dream come true to work together and to see the astounding work he's done for us." The cover shows a man being consumed by a giant, living tape machine.

== Track listing ==
No.	Title	Length
1.	"The Wrong Stuff"	3:20
2.	"Legend of Speed"	2:23
3.	"Backwards Bible"	3:29
4.	"Beverly Hills Robocop"	4:21
5.	"Smoke the Blow with Willem Dafoe"	1:17
6.	"We Started the Fire"	3:13
7.	"Terrorscope"	3:29
8.	"The Cannibals Are in the Streets (Therefore) All Flesh Must Be Eaten"	3:47
9.	"Shitting Yourself to Live"	0:21
10.	"Matrioshka Brain"	3:45
11.	"Metal Idiot"	2:20
12.	"Wrecking Ball"	4:33
Total length:		36:02
