= Toxic Holocaust =

American thrash metal band

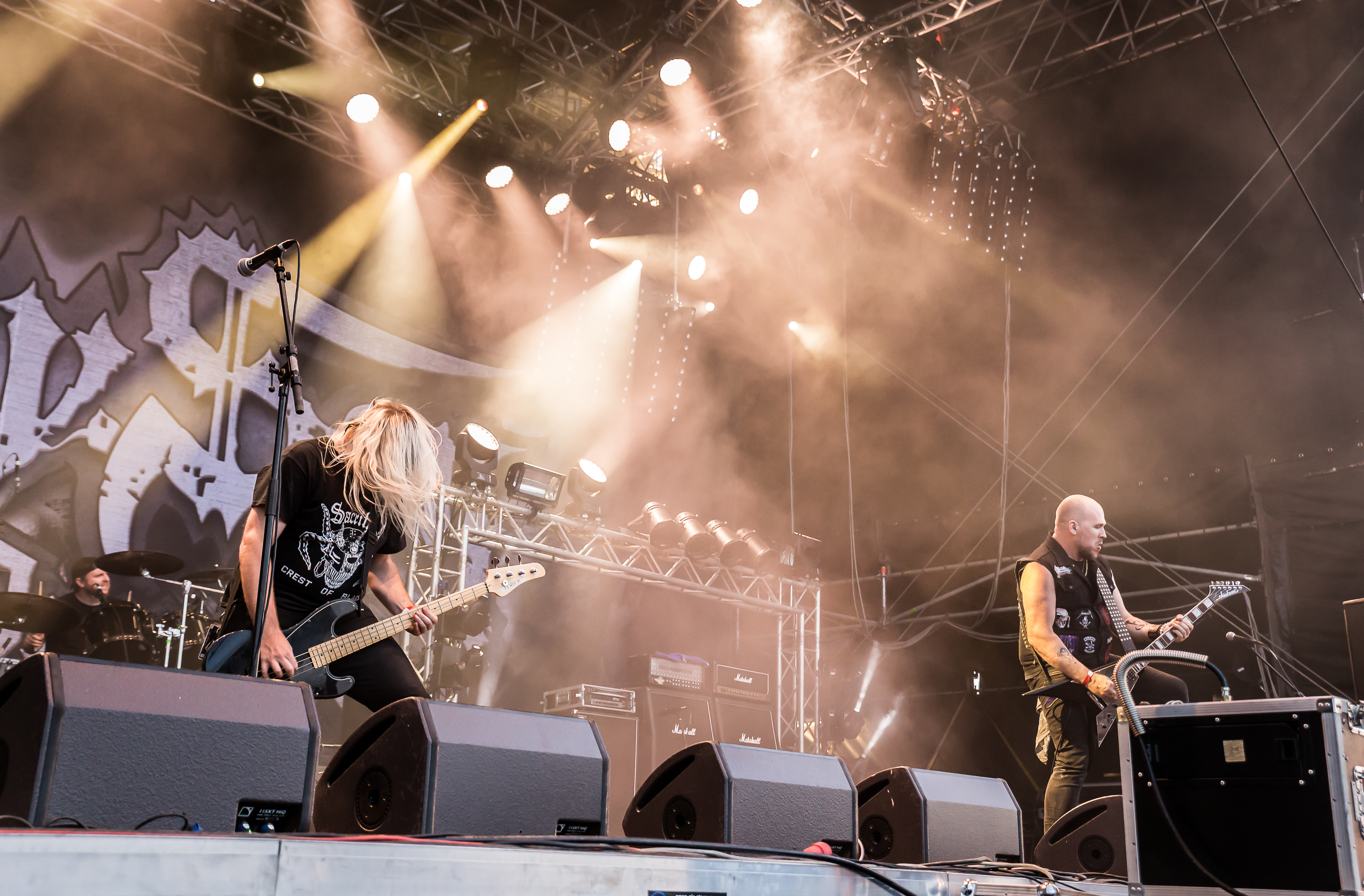
- Toxic Holocaust at Party.San Metal Open Air 2018

Background information
- Origin: Portland, Oregon, U.S.
- Genre: Thrash metal
- Years active: 1999–present
- Labels: Relapse, eOne
- Members: Joel Grind; Tyler Becker; Robert Gray
- Past members: Al Positions; Phil Zeller; Nick Bellmore
- Website: toxicholocaust.com

Toxic Holocaust is an American thrash metal band from Portland, Oregon.

== History ==
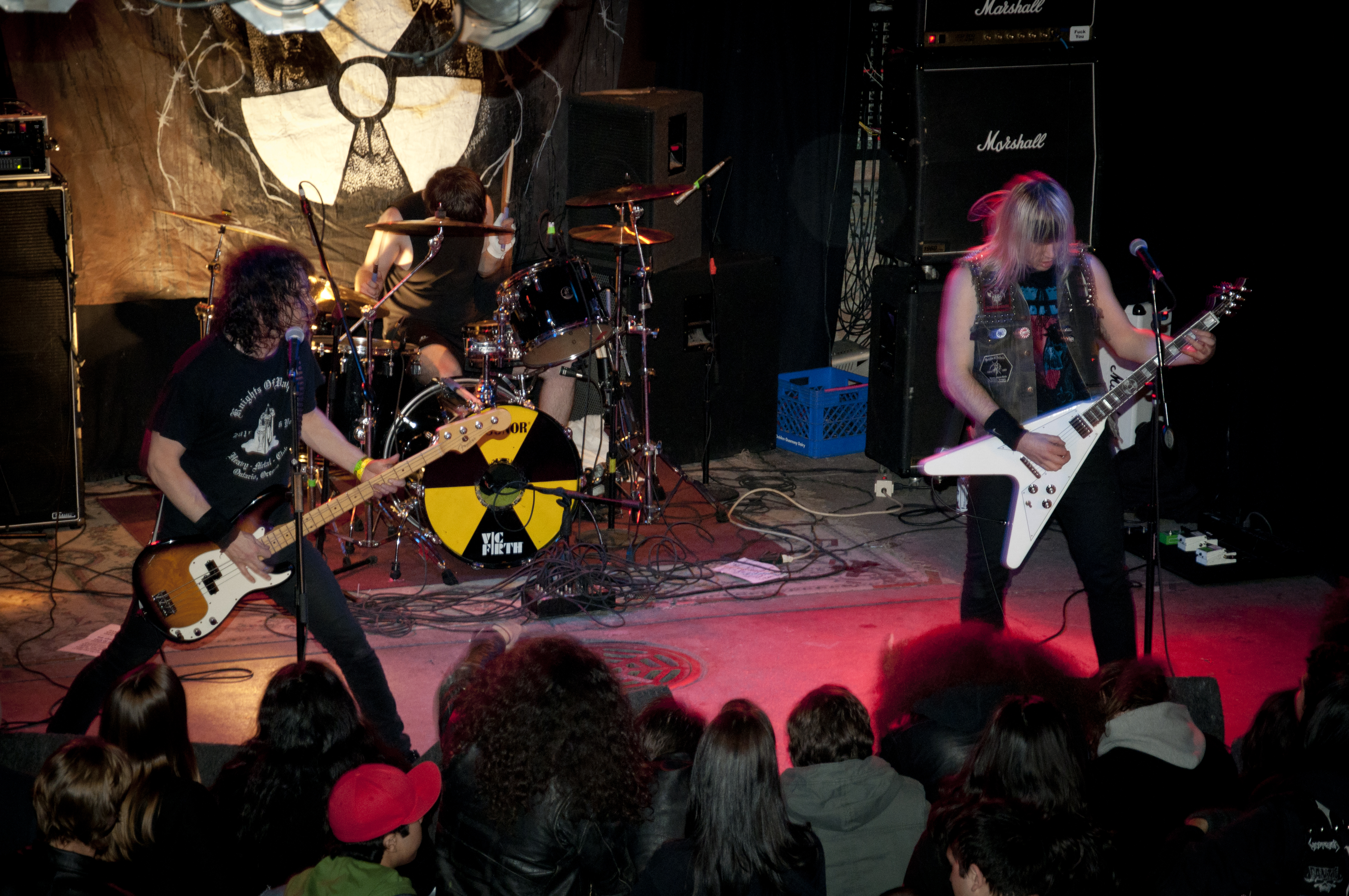
Toxic Holocaust in 2011

Joel Grind founded Toxic Holocaust in 1999. He originally wrote and recorded all of the band's music himself, and after a couple of demo releases (Radiation Sickness, 1999; Critical Mass, 2002), he made his official album debut as Toxic Holocaust with Evil Never Dies (2003).

Two years later, after some touring with a hired backing band, Grind released the second Toxic Holocaust album, Hell on Earth (2005), which once again he wrote and recorded by himself. The album notably features cover art by Ed Repka, known for having created iconic covers for albums by Megadeth, Death and others. Extensive touring followed, along with a recording contract with Relapse Records.

In addition to releasing the third Toxic Holocaust album, An Overdose of Death... (2008), Relapse reissued Evil Never Dies and Hell on Earth. Toxic Holocaust also recorded and released a number of other recordings: Gravelord (2009, EP), Conjure and Command (2011), and Chemistry of Consciousness (2013).

In 2019 Joel Grind signed to Entertainment One, and released Primal Future: 2019 later that year. Tours were planned but halted due to the spread of COVID-19.

The band is scheduled to perform at the Hell's Heroes music festival in Houston in March 2026.

== Musical style and influences ==
Toxic Holocaust plays thrash metal that is heavily influenced by punk rock, and has been compared to bands such as Venom, Discharge, Motörhead, D.R.I., The Exploited and Slayer. They also take influence from first-wave black metal.

== Other projects ==
Grind now works as a music producer, and has been involved in side projects other than Toxic Holocaust. He has released synth tracks, as well as metal albums for his solo projects War Ripper and the Yellowgoat Sessions. Grind is known for being social with his fans and can often be seen at the merchandise table before a Toxic Holocaust show.

== Personal life ==
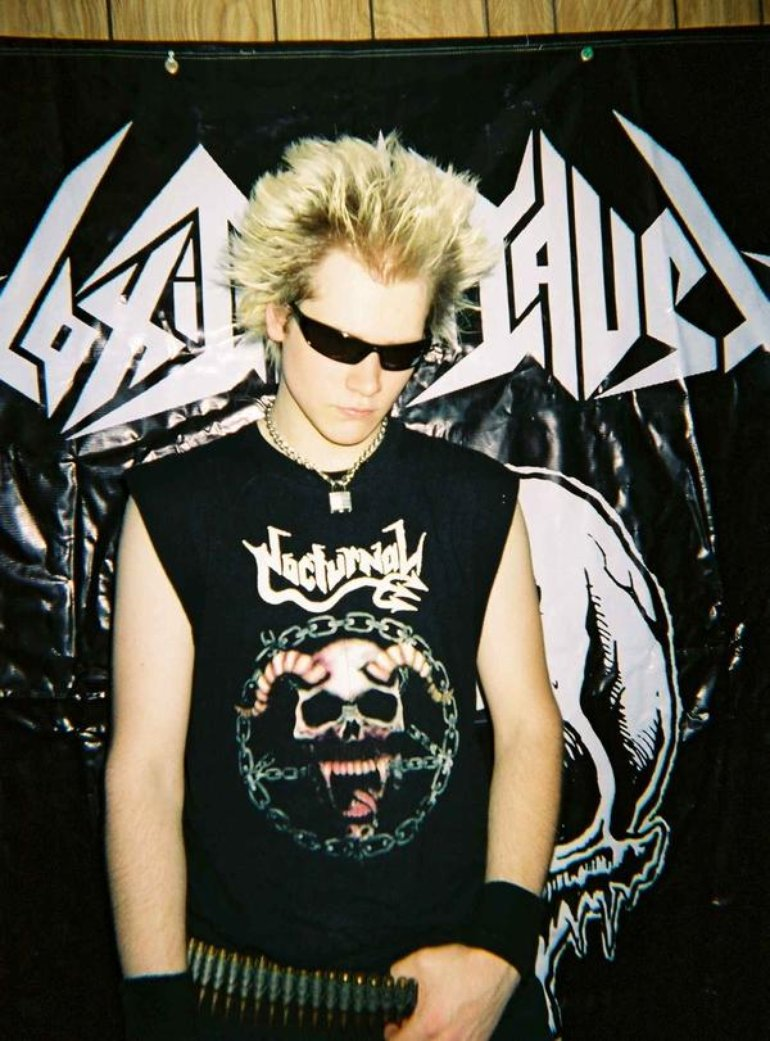
Joel Grind around the release of Evil Never Dies

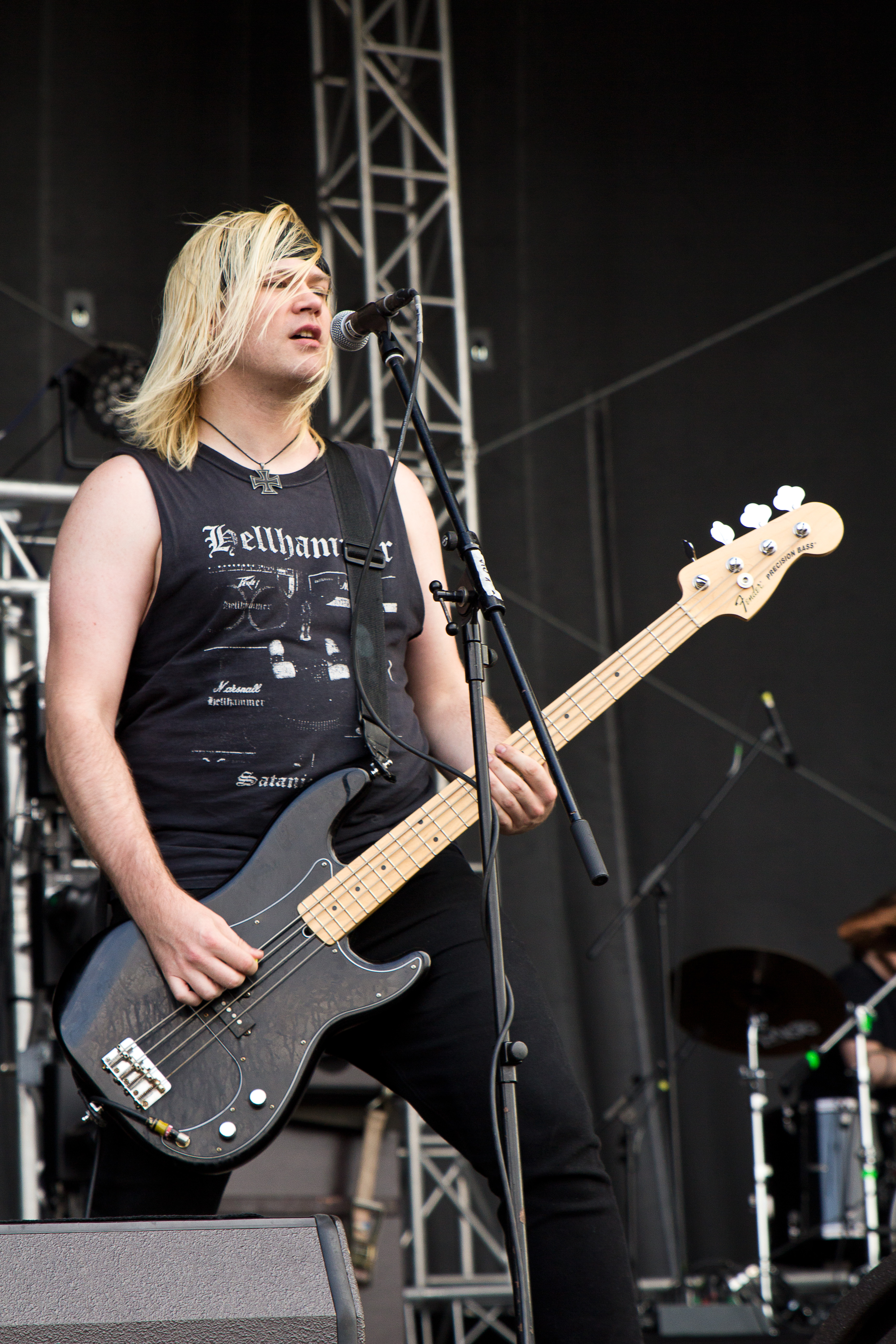
Joel Grind at Party.San Open Air 2015

Joel Grind is the frontman and main songwriter of Toxic Holocaust. He now lives in Oregon. Grind began his musical career at a young age, first playing drums. His musical influences included bands such as Metallica, Bathory, Venom, and Sodom. As a teen, he ran a home recording and mixing business for local bands. In 1999, he started Toxic Holocaust. Around this time, he picked up guitar.

== Members ==
=== Current members ===
- Joel Grind – lead vocals (1999–present), bass (1999–2008, 2015–present), guitars (1999–2015), drums (1999–2008)
- Tyler Becker – drums (2018–present)
- Rob Gray – guitars, backing vocals (2019–present)

=== Past members ===
- Donny Paycheck – drums (2008)
- Al Positions – drums (2008–2009)
- Phil Zeller – bass, backing vocals (2008–2015)
- Nick Bellmore – drums (2009–2018)
- Charlie Bellmore – guitars, backing vocals (2015–2018)
- Eric Eisenhauer – guitars, backing vocals (2018–2019)

== Discography ==
=== Studio albums ===
- Evil Never Dies (2003)
- Hell on Earth (2005)
- An Overdose of Death... (2008)
- Conjure and Command (2011)
- Chemistry of Consciousness (2013)
- Primal Future: 2019 (2019)

=== EPs ===
- Death Master (2003, Gloom Records)
- Power from Hell (2004)
- Reaper's Grave (2006, Gloom Records)
- Gravelord (2009)

=== Demos ===
- Radiation Sickness (1999)
- Critical Mass (2002)
- Promo 2004 (2004)
- Demo 2007 (2008)

=== Live and video albums ===
- Only Deaf Is Real (2007, live album)
- Brazilian Slaughter 2006 (2008, video album)

=== Compilations ===
- Toxic Thrash Metal (2004, CD)
- From the Ashes of Nuclear Destruction (2013, CD)

=== Splits ===
- Toxic Holocaust / Oprichniki (2001, CD)
- Implements of Mass Destruction / Nuclear Apocalypse:666 (2002, CD)
- Outbreak of Evil (2004, CD)
- Thrashbeast from Hell (2004, tape)
- Blasphemy, Mayhem, War (2005, CD)
- Don't Burn the Witch... (2006, 10-inch)
- Speed n' Spikes Volume 1 (2008, 7-inch)
- Toxic Holocaust / Inepsy (2010, 12-inch)
- Toxic Holocaust / Midnight (2011, 7-inch to benefit the Japanese tsunami victims)
- Toxic Waste (with Municipal Waste) (2012, 12-inch)

=== Contributions ===
- Thrashing Like a Maniac (2007, CD)
- In the Sign of Sodom – Sodomaniac Tribute (2008, 12-inch)
- Power Trip – Nightmare Logic (2017, CD) [mastering]

=== Videography ===
- "Wild Dogs"
- "Nuke the Cross"
- "Lord of the Wasteland"
- "Judgement Awaits"
- "666"
- "Agony of the Damned"
- "Acid Fuzz"
- "New World Beyond"
