= Jordan O'Connor =

Canadian musician, composer and audio engineer

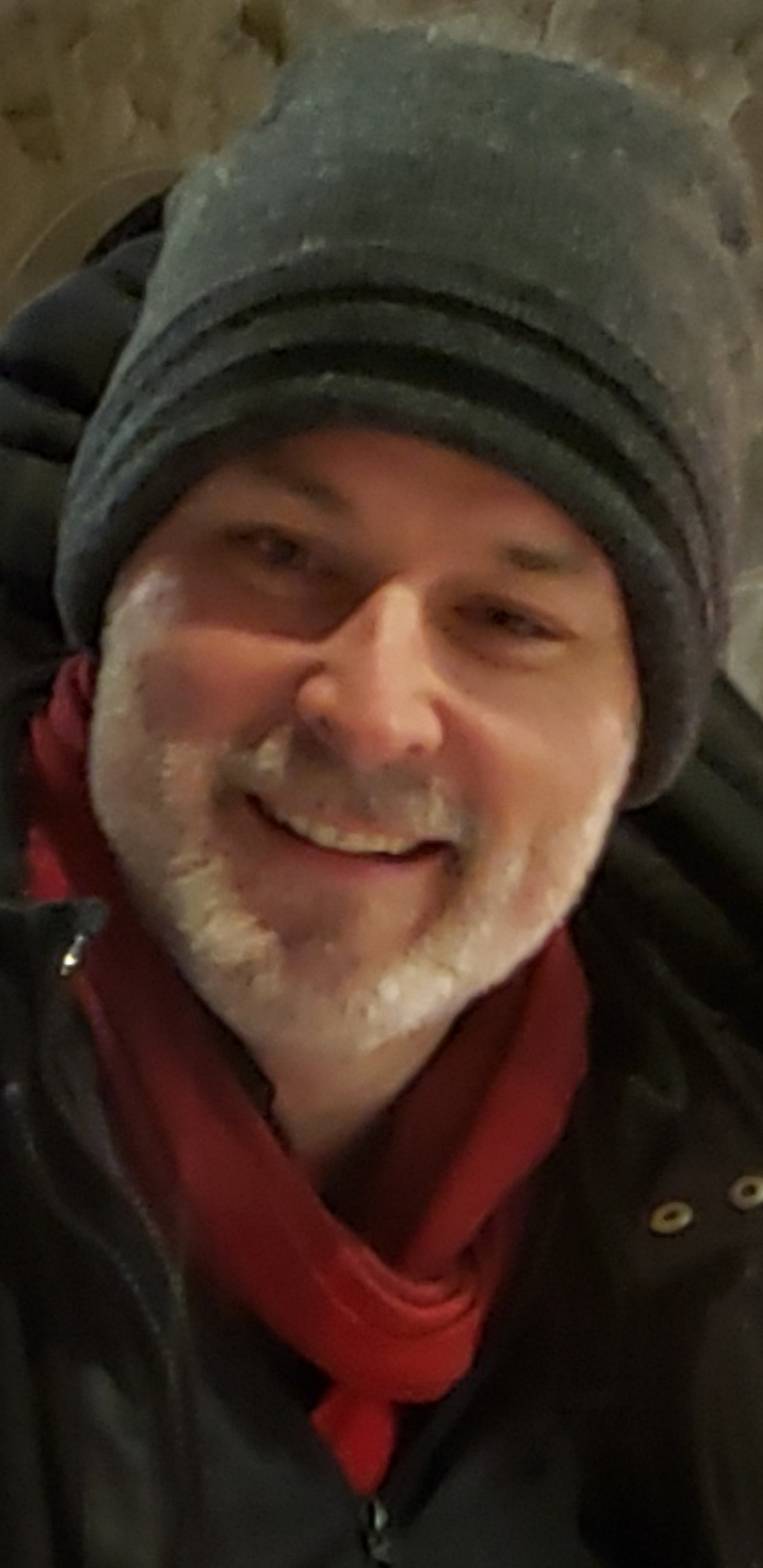
- Jordan O'Connor
- Born: November 20, 1972 (age 53); Ottawa, Ontario
- Occupations: musician, composer
- Website: http://www.jordanoconnor.com

Jordan O'Connor (born November 20, 1972, in Ottawa, Ontario) is a Canadian musician (electric and double bass), composer and audio engineer. He is signed to Candyrat Records and also works through his own production company The Breath and is composer-in-residence for the avant-garde music ensemble Euphonia.

== Biography ==
O'Connor has performed and recorded with a wide range of musicians, including fingerstyle guitarists Don Ross and Andy McKee, singer-songwriter Brooke Miller, jazz saxophone player Mike Murley, jazz pianist DD Jackson, pianist-trombonist Mark Ferguson, jazz guitarist Justin Haynes, Craig Harley, drummer Nick Fraser and others.

He released When We Were Little Girls with his band Cash Cow in 2000, which received the National Post's Album of the Year in 2000. The CD features O'Connor's original compositions with fellow musicians, Mike Murley (sax), Craig Harley (piano) and Nick Fraser (drums) and O'Connor on bass.

His second CD, Fragments vol. One (2001) features Bryden Baird (trumpet), David French (sax), Craig Harley (piano) and Jesse Baird (drums), with O'Connor on electric and acoustic bass. His third CD Falling Forward (2003) is a collection of improvisations by O'Connor (bass), Justin Haynes (guitar) and Nick Fraser (drums), with a bonus track featuring Craig Harley on organ.

In 2006, he released his first solo bass CD, entitled Lebreton, which is available for free download on his website. He is about to release his second Cash Cow CD, Love in the Big City, which will be available on Candyrat Records. He can also be heard on Don Ross's CDs Huron Street and Live in Your Head.

== The Breath.com ==
In 1999 O'Connor founded a production company named The Breath along with longtime friend and business partner, Shane Belcourt. Originally intended as a way to promote O'Connor's varied musical projects and Belcourt's folk-rock group (The Shane Anthony band), The Breath grew into a multimedia, audio and film company. In 2007, The Breath produced the feature film Tkaronto. O'Connor composed the score for this film, did film editing, and acted as a producer on the project. The Breath has also released two short films, Pookums and The Squeeze Box, for which O'Connor also composed the score.

The Breath has done work for the Métis Nation of Ontario, Indspire, the Government of Ontario, and Lotus Yoga Centre.

== Selected discography ==
• Red (2018): Jordan O'Connor
• Lost Radio (2017): Jordan O'Connor
• Live In Your Head (2006): Don Ross
• Lebreton (2006): Jordan O’Connor
• Falling Forward (2003): Jordan O’Connor
• Robot Monster (2004): Don Ross
• Fragments Vol. One (2001): Jordan O’Connor
• Huron Street (2001): Don Ross
• Tequila Vampire Matinee (2000): Kevin Quain
• Found (2000): Jennifer Ryan
• Hands Like Mine (2000): Shane Anthony Band
• When We Were Little Girls (2000): Jordan O’Connor’s Cash Cow
• Hangover Honeymoon (1999): Kevin Quain
• Sky Stories (1998): Shane Anthony Band
• Debunker (1997): The Unbeatables
• How Do You Feel About That? (1996): Jennifer Ryan
• The Great Dogs Are Loose In The Yard (1995): The Unbeatables
