= Don Ross =

Don Ross may refer to:

- Don Ross (acoustician) (1922–2015), civilian submariner and acoustics expert
- Don Ross (baseball) (1914–1996), American baseball player
- Don Ross (bodybuilder) (1946–1995), American bodybuilder and wrestler
- Don Ross (guitarist) (born 1960), Canadian fingerstyle guitarist
  - Don Ross (album)
- Don Ross (footballer) (1934–2026), Australian rules footballer
- Don Ross (ice hockey) (born 1942), American ice hockey player
- Don Ross (theatre producer) (1902–1980), English music hall performer and theatre producer
- Don Ross, Australian artist, inaugural vice-president of the Contemporary Art Society, Queensland Branch in 1961

== See also ==
- Donald Ross (disambiguation)
