= Calum Graham =

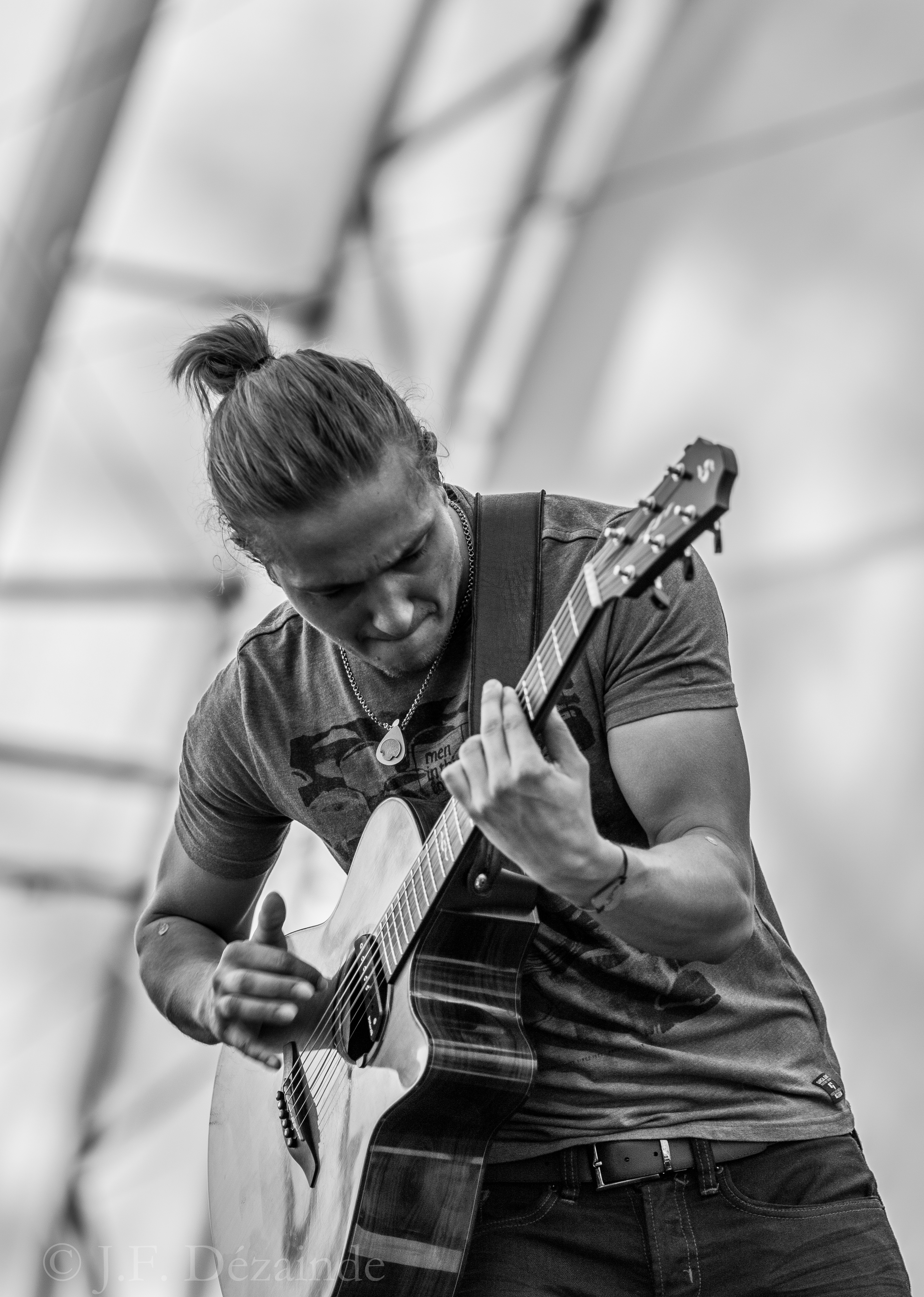
- Calum Graham at the 2016 Canadian Guitar Festival

Background information
- Born: October 29, 1991 (age 34); Fort St. John, British Columbia
- Genres: Fingerstyle guitar
- Occupations: Musician, composer, singer-songwriter
- Instruments: Guitar, vocals
- Years active: 2004–present
- Labels: CandyRat
- Website: calumgraham.com

Calum Graham is a Canadian fingerstyle guitarist and singer-songwriter. He has classical guitar training, but uses a percussive technique. He has released four albums. When he was 22 he was listed by Acoustic Guitar magazine as one of their 30 "great guitarists under 30".

== Early life ==
At the early age of 12, Graham developed a passion for the guitar during occasional lessons with his father. After graduating from secondary school, Graham began studies in Classical Guitar at the University of Calgary and Mount Royal University. During an electric guitar lesson, he was exposed to the album "Bearing Straight" by fingerstyle guitarist Don Ross. At this point, he began informal studies within the same genre.

In 2009 Graham won the Calgary Stampede Talent Search, and also the ensuing national-level talent contest. He came second in the fingerstyle guitar competition at the 2009 Canadian Guitar Festival, and won it in 2010.

In 2011 he won the Canada's Walk of Fame "A Song For Canada" song contest. The prize included C$25,000 in cash, and time in a recording studio.

== Discography ==
Album title	Year
Sunny Side Up	2009
Indivisibility (EP)	2010
12:34	2013
Phoenix Rising	2013
Tabula Rasa	2016
Thread of Creation	2019
Sympatheia	2022
Phoenix Rising (10 Year Anniversary Edition)	2024
