= CandyRat Records =

- Founded: 2005
- Founder: Rob Poland
- Genre: Fingerstyle, Percussive fingerstyle
- Country of origin: United States
- Location: Menomonee Falls, Wisconsin
- Official website: candyrat.com

CandyRat Records (also stylized as CANdYRAT) is an independent American record label and online music store located in Menomonee Falls, Wisconsin. They primarily represent instrumental guitar artists, with a focus on acoustic guitar, but include electronic music, alternative rock, singer-songwriter, and progressive rock, with musicians coming from many countries.

Rob Poland founded the label in 2004, first signing fingerstyle guitar talent Don Ross, followed by Andy McKee, Antoine Dufour, and three other artists before officially opening in 2005. CandyRat Records has been called the "biggest acoustical guitar label in the world", and the two-handed tapping technique of playing the guitar to produce bass, rhythm, melody and harmony, which is practised by many of its artists, has become known as the CandyRat style. The label gained fame after videos on its official YouTube page, 'rpoland', gained viral success. Recording sessions are filmed and uploaded, contributing to the success of the albums. As of November 2014, the most popular video on the channel, a live recording of Andy Mckee's "Drifting", garnered over 50 million views. Their YouTube channel has over a half-million subscribers and almost four-hundred million views.

CandyRat Guitar Night Tour features CandyRat Records' guitar virtuosos traveling the U.S. and the world. For 2017, Antoine Dufour and Ian Ethan Case toured. CandyRat is also a festival partner for the Wilson Center Guitar Competition & Festival, with Rob Poland and the CandyRat headliners as some of the judges for the fingerstyle competition.

== Artists ==
CandyRat Records had over 50 signed and independent artists as of August 2017.

=== Current ===
- Adam Ben Ezra
- Alex Anderson
- Alex Trugman
- Andrew White
- Antoine Dufour
- Ben Flanders
- Brendan Power
- Brooke Miller
- Calum Graham
- Chris Mike
- Chris Woods Groove
- Craig D'Andrea
- Daniel Voth
- Dean Magraw
- Derrin Nauendorf
- Don Ross
- Emma Dean
- Erick Turnbull
- Erik Mongrain
- Eva Atmatzidou
- Gareth Pearson
- Gregory Hoskins
- Guitar Republic
- Hunter van Larkins
- Ian Ethan Case
- Jimmy Wahlsteen
- Justin Taylor
- Kelly Sciandra
- Kelly Valleau
- Laszlo
- Luca Stricagnoli
- Lucas Michailidis
- Mark Minelli
- Mathieu Fiset
- Matthew Santos
- Michael Chapdelaine
- Michael Kobrin
- Michael Manring
- Mike Dawes
- Nicholas Barron
- Peter Ciluzzi
- Pino Forastiere
- Preston Reed
- Ray Montford Group
- Richard Barrett
- Ryan Ayers
- Ryan Spendlove
- Sammy Boller
- Sebastien Cloutier
- Sergio Altamura
- Spencer Elliott
- Stefano Barone
- Steffen Schackinger
- Steven Padin
- The Reign of Kindo
- Thomas Leeb
- Tommy Gauthier
- Trevor Gordon Hall
- Van Larkins

=== Former ===
- Maneli Jamal
- Andy McKee
- Robert Taylor
- Andy Fox
- Ewan Dobson
