= Justin St-Pierre =

Canadian composer (born 1978)

- Occupation: Fingerstyle player
- Years active: 2006 - currently
- Agent: Lea Deborde
- Website: www.justinst-pierre.com

Justin St-Pierre (born September 13, 1978 in Macamic, Quebec, Canada) is a Canadian composer and guitarist part of the fingerstyle movement. Influenced mostly by the places he visited and his environment, his style is as much indescriptible as meditative.

== Biography ==
Justin St-Pierre learned piano at the age of 8 for 2 years before discovering acoustic guitar. His first guitar belong to his father and was just an object of decoration in the living room before the young boy brought it to life.

From the age of 11 and during all his adolescence, he practiced acoustic and electric guitar in his basement. He learned guitar by himself and never took classes.

Justin St-Pierre was inspired early on by the work of Metallica, Pearl Jam, Kurt Cobain and all the underground Seattle scene.

He started a band at the age of 18, Synapse, and composed most of the pieces at the acoustic guitar before playing them with a bass.

He took luthierie lessons in 2002 and built his own guitar. In 2004, his music was used for the documentary Entre l'écorce et l'érable and launched his first demo, Le Vent du Nord (Wind of the North) that made him win the Frimat festival in 2006.

In 2006, Justin St-Pierre become owner of the music bar Rafiot and released his first album Rafiot in 2008 named after the culturel place.

In 2010, he travelled to France as the ambassador of his city, Val d'Or, for the FrancoFete festival.

In 2011, his second album La Faille (The Fault) is a tribute to his natal land, as it refers to the deep of the golddiggings of his region. The album is a success and made him travel in many territories of Canada.

At the same time, Justin St-Pierre met Erik Mongrain. The artist became a great friend and made him appreciate some fingerstyle figures as Don Ross or Michael Hedges.

After being a top finisher in several prestigious guitar competitions, Justin won in 2013 the first place of the Canadien Guitar Festival in Ontario.

Sheldon Schwartz, a famous luthier from Ontario, built him during one year his own guitar, The Arrow.

== Recent works ==
In 2015, Justin St-Pierre launched a crowdfunding campaign to finance his 3rd album L'Insulaire, that have been released in October 2015.

After touring in New Caledonia in 2015,2016 and 2018, he's now touring in Europe, US and Quebec.

== Label ==
Justin St-Pierre is part of the Fretmonkey Records Label since 2016.

== Discography ==
- Rafiot (2008)
- La Faille (2011)
- L'Insulaire (2015)
