= Kishibe =

Kishibe (written: 岸部 or 岸辺) is a Japanese surname. Notable people with the surname include:

- Ittoku Kishibe (岸部 一徳, born 1947), Japanese actor and musician
- Masaaki Kishibe (岸部 真明, born 1964), Japanese guitarist
- Shigeo Kishibe (岸辺 成雄, 1912–2005), Japanese musicologist
- Shiro Kishibe (岸部 四郎, born 1949), Japanese actor

== Fictional characters ==
- Kishibe (岸辺), a fictional character from the anime and manga series Chainsaw Man
- Rie Kishibe, a character from the game Digimon Story: Cyber Sleuth
- Rohan Kishibe (岸辺 露伴), a character from Jojo's Bizarre Adventure Diamond Is Unbreakable and protagonist of its spin-off Thus Spoke Rohan Kishibe

== See also ==
- Kishibe Station, a railway station in Suita, Osaka Prefecture, Japan
