= Stomp box =

Percussion instrument

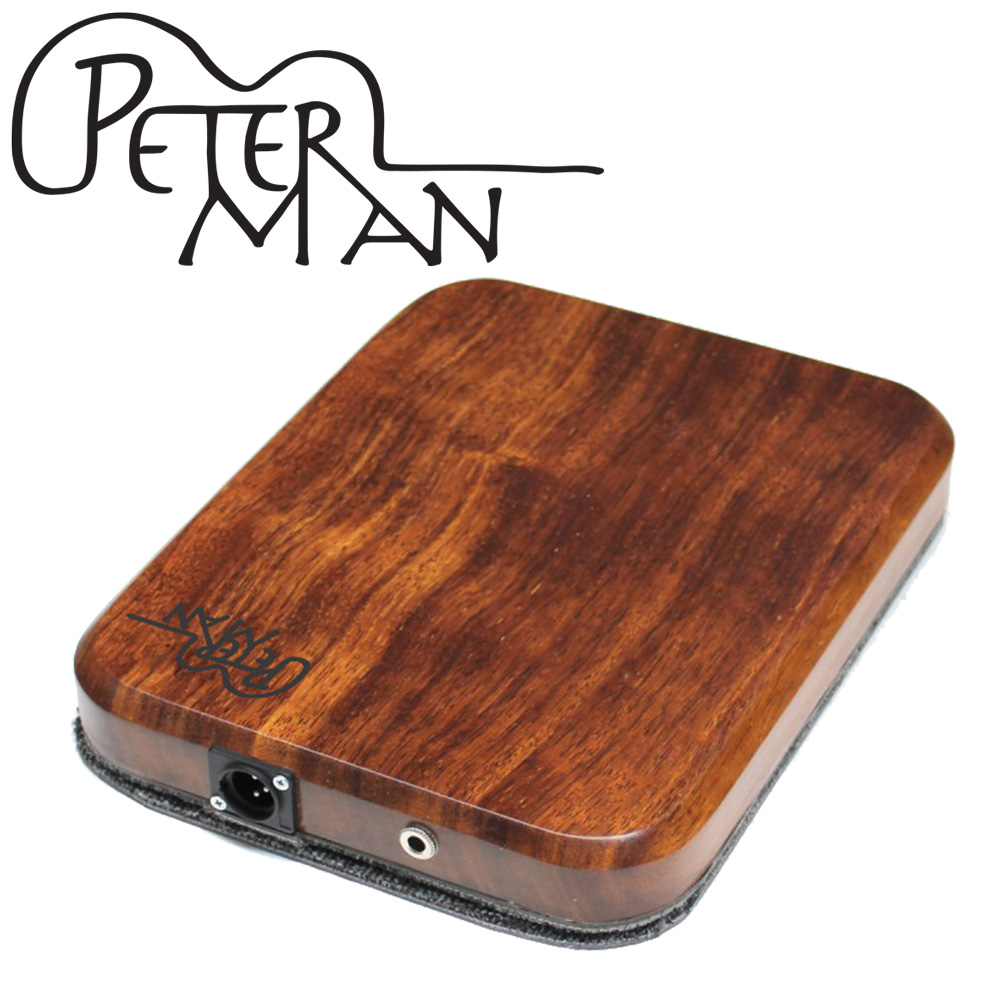
A Peterman Bigstomp stomp box used by Bob Malone

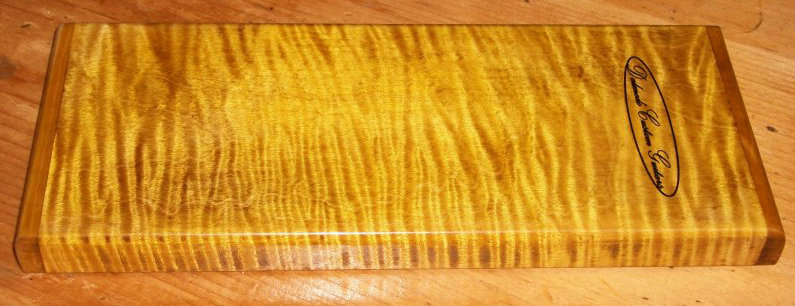
A flame maple stomp box handcrafted by Dalmedo Custom Guitars.

A stomp box (or stompbox) is a percussion instrument consisting of a small box placed under the foot, which is tapped or stamped on rhythmically to produce a sound similar to that of a bass drum. A stomp box allows a performer such as a singer or guitar player to create a simple rhythmic self-accompaniment. Stompboxes are most commonly used in American folk and blues music, but they are also used across the musical spectrum.

There are commercially produced stomp boxes available, such as the Wild Dog stomp box, Roland percussion pad, and Wazinator stomp box, but performers often simply mount a dynamic microphone inside whatever wooden box they have handy. Some homemade stomp boxes include customized features such as a built-in preamp or equalizer.

In 2010s-era use, a simple piezo transducer (or sometimes a microphone) is located inside the box to allow amplification of the stompbox's bass sound through the PA system or bass amplifier. Other stompboxes such as the PorchBoard Bass and the Peterman acoustic use magnetic sensors designed to produce low-end frequencies.

== Players ==
- Tash Sultana uses and endorses Wild Dog stomp boxes during their solo performances.
- John Hartford did not employ a stomp box, but used "a variety of props such as plywood squares and boards with sand and gravel on which to stomp, kick, and scrape to create natural and organic background noises" as well as "amplified plywood for tapping his feet" both in the studio and in live performance.
- Seasick Steve uses a self-made stomp box he named the Mississippi Drum Machine.
- Pete Flood
- Nathan Rogers
- Xavier Rudd
- John Lee Hooker did not use a stomp box, instead "stomping on a wooden pallet in time with the music."
- Jamie Cullum
- Jeff Lang
- Harry Manx
- Bob Malone
- Ash Grunwald
- Jon Boden uses "a large wooden box containing a microphone and made to sound like a kick drum—an idea he … borrowed from singer-songwriter Rory McLeod."
- Chris Woods (guitarist) had a stomp box made by Logarhythm, the "Chris Woods Signature Pro-log"
- John Butler

== Gallery ==
PorchBoard Bass

The Ellis stomp box

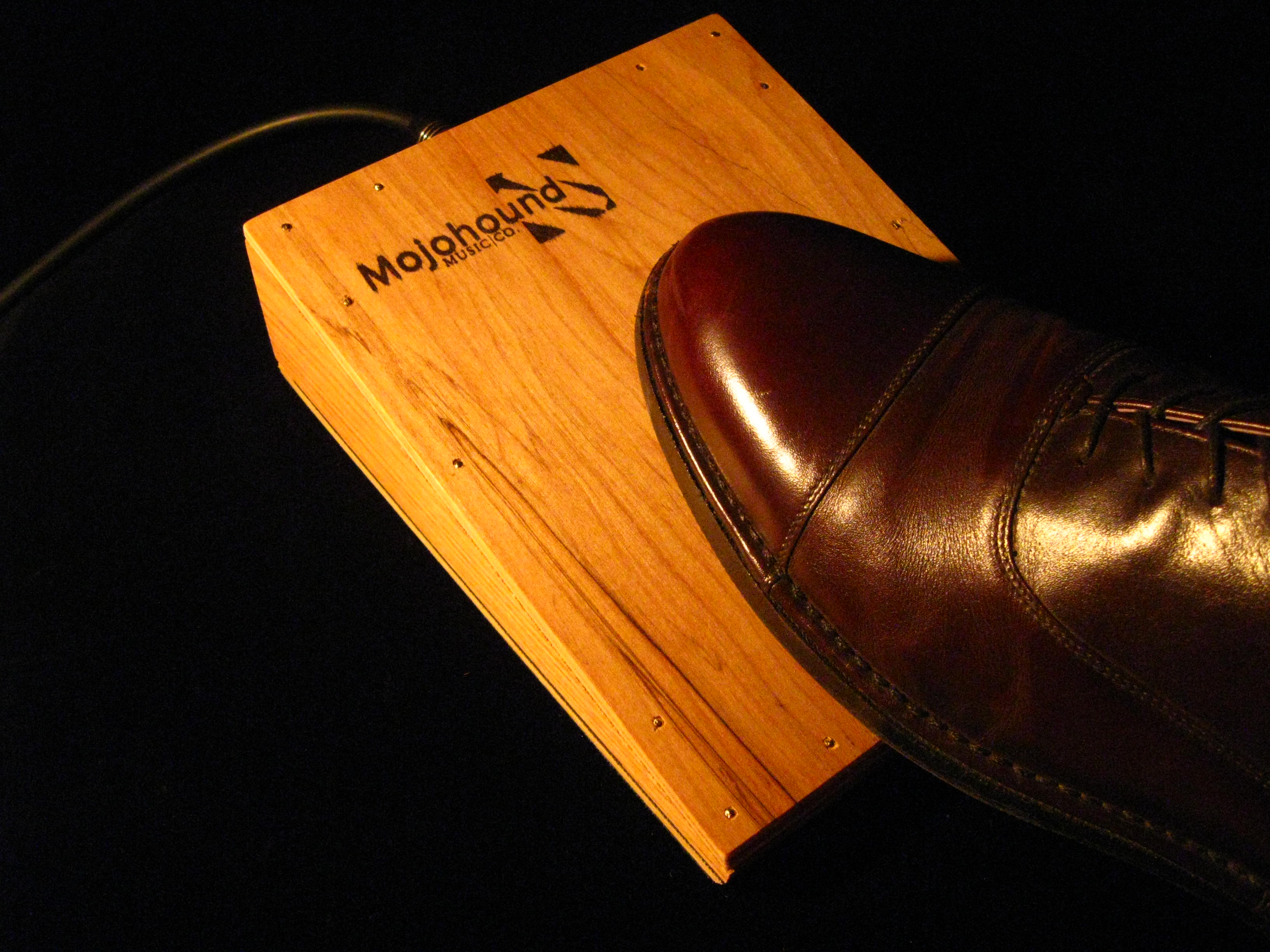
The Mojohound Music Company Stompbox (MDM-I)

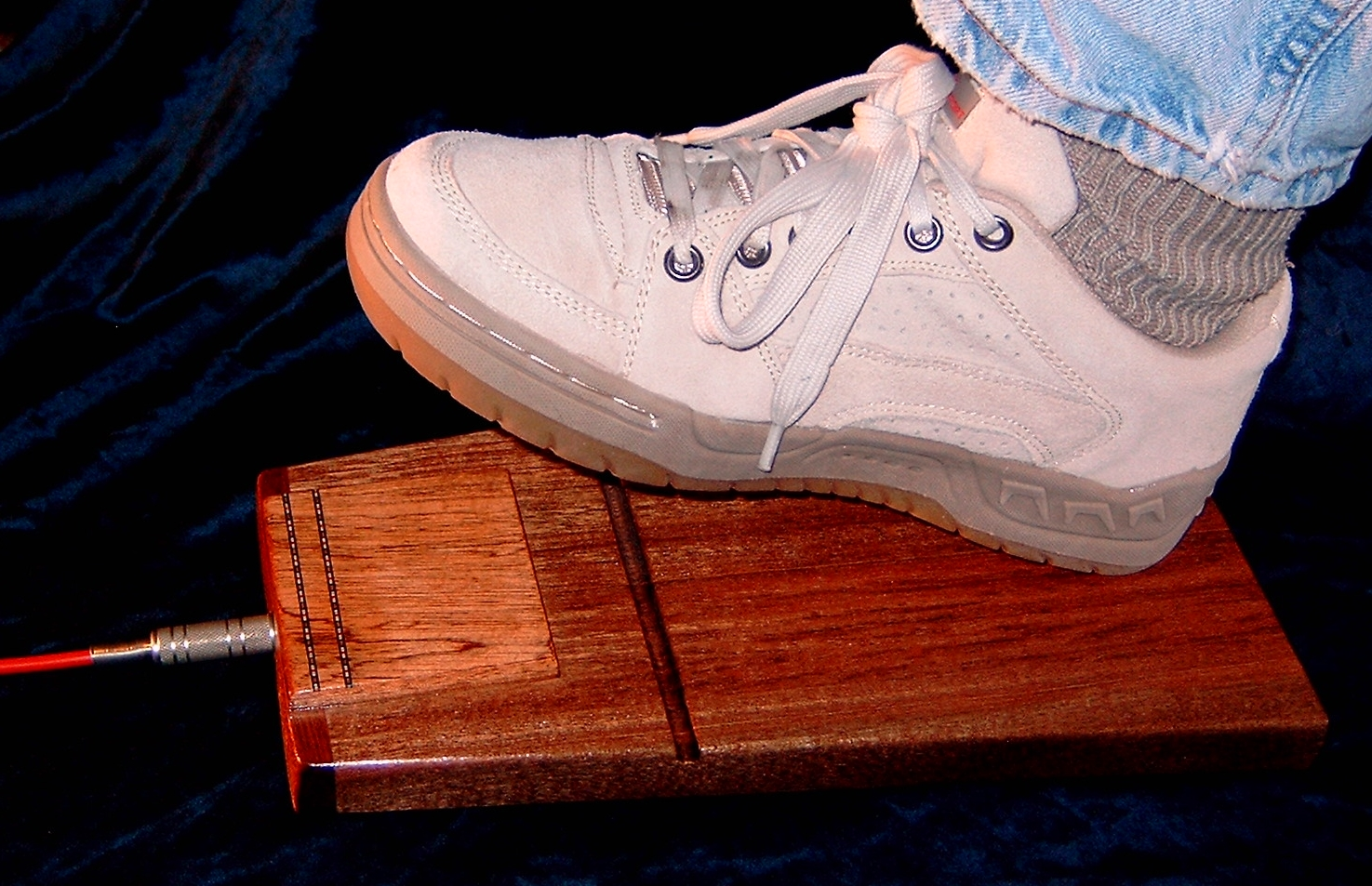
Big Foot Stomp by musiXtools

Pocket Stomp by musiXtools

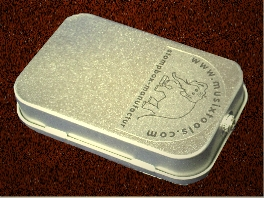
Tiny Tin Stompbox by musiXtools

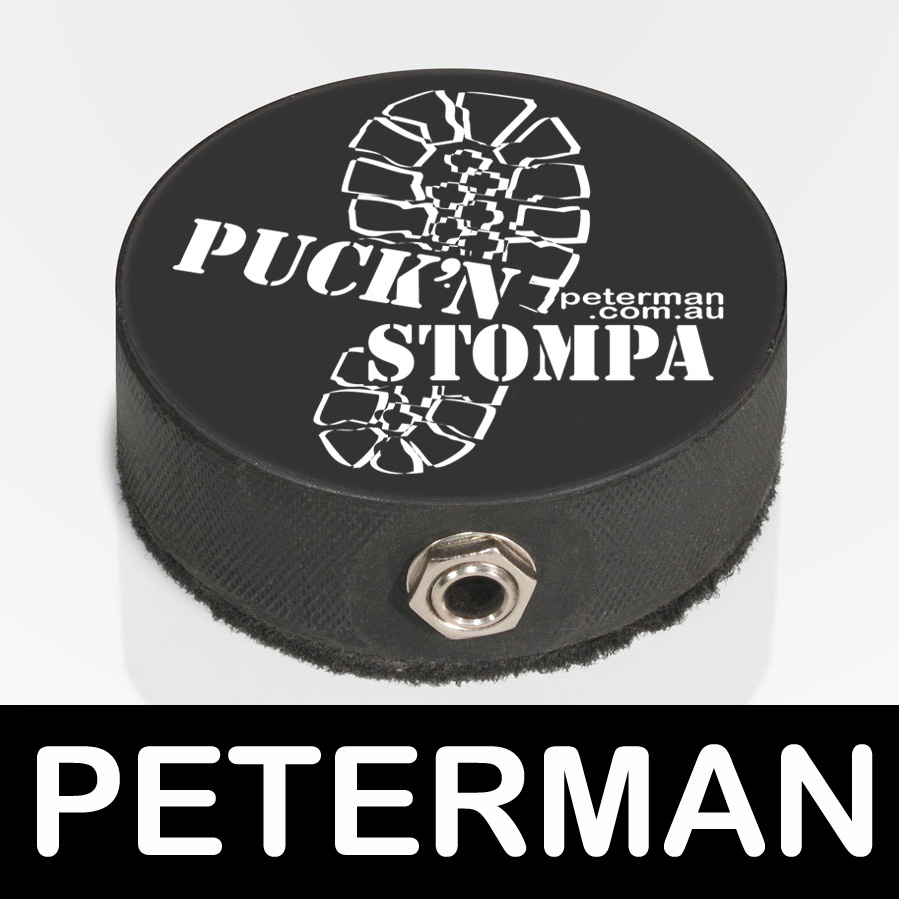
Puck'n Stompa by Peterman

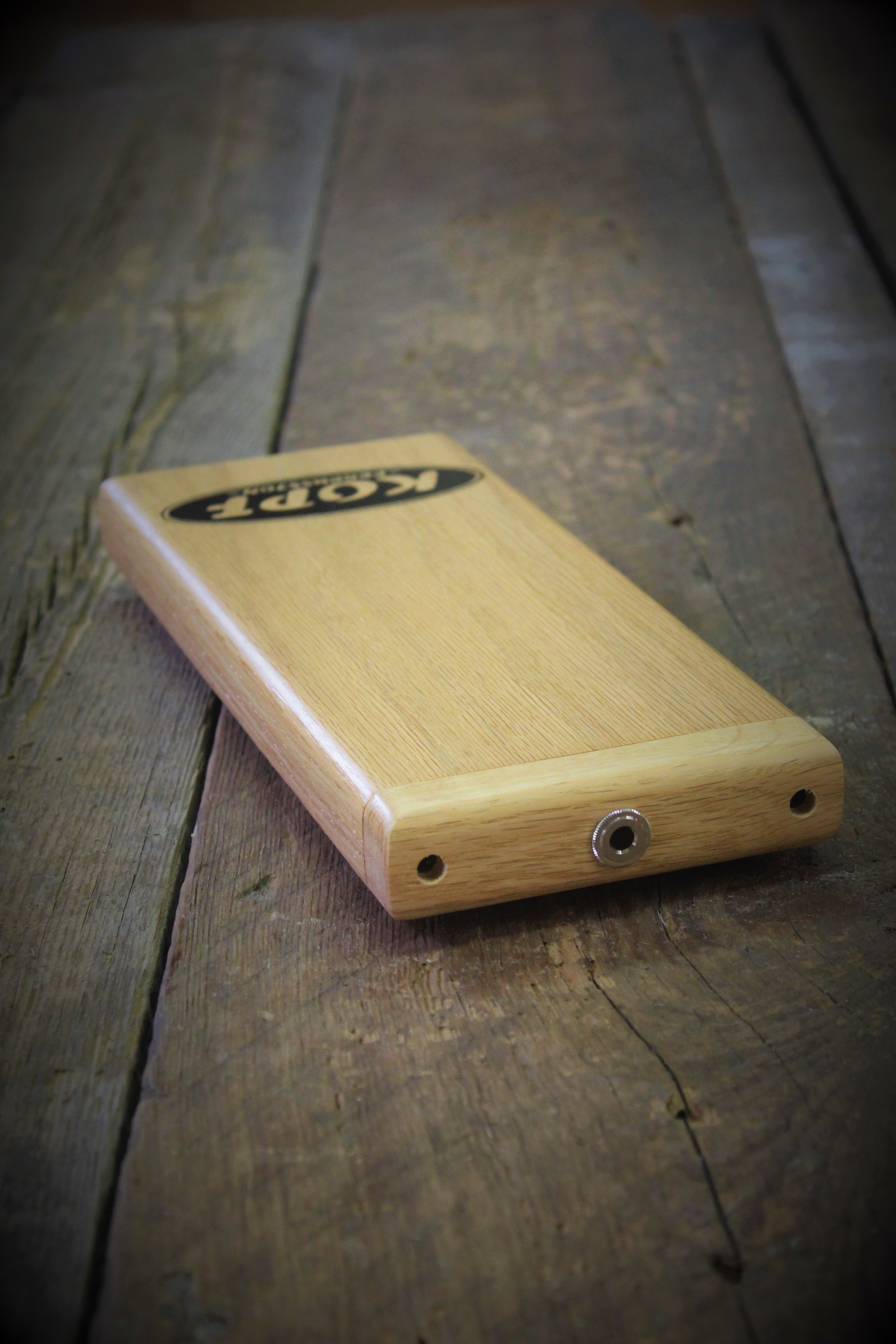
ToeKicker Acoustic Stompbox

== See also ==
- Cajón
- Effects unit
- Foot drum
- Electronic tuner
- Trigger pad
