= Music for Vacuuming =

Studio album by Don Ross
- Released: 2005
- Label: CandyRat

Don Ross chronology
Robot Monster (2003)	Music for Vacuuming (2005)	Live in Your Head (2006)

Music for Vacuuming is an album by Canadian guitarist Don Ross. It is his first for the Candyrat Records label.

== Track listing ==
1. "How to Eat an Avalanche" (solo version)
2. "Rockbarra"
3. "Dracula II"
4. "Brooke's Waltz"
5. "Tochigi"
6. "My Previous Life"
7. "Never Got to Pernambuco"
8. "Another Island of Women"
9. "How to Eat an Avalanche" (family version)
10. "Fleetstep Choreography"

== Personnel ==
- Don Ross – guitar
