= Three Hands =

Studio album by Don Ross
- Released: 1992
- Label: Duke Street Records

Don Ross chronology
Don Ross (1990)	Three Hands (1992)	This Dragon Won't Sleep (1995)

Three Hands is a recording by Canadian guitarist Don Ross, released in 1992. It is his last for Duke Street Records after being signed to a contract with Columbia/Sony Canada.

== Track listing ==
1. "Spirit Wars" (Geoff Bartley)
2. "Hoover the Musical Dog"
3. "Island of Women"
4. "A Child Must Grow"
5. "3 Hands"
6. "Run, Don't Walk"
7. "Sugar"
8. "Kehewin"
9. "Big Buck"
10. "Everybody Lies" (Leo Kottke)
11. "39 Weeks"
12. "Leger de Main"

== Personnel ==
- Don Ross – guitar, vocals
