= Donald Ross =

Donald Ross may refer to:

- Donald Ross (1941–2026), American politician
- Donald A. Ross (1857–1937), Canadian politician
- Donald Ross (golf course architect) (1872–1948), Scottish-born American golfer and golf course designer
- Donald P. Ross (1902–1973), American horse racetrack and racing stable owner and breeder
- Donald K. Ross (1910–1992), United States Navy officer and Medal of Honor recipient
- Donald Ross (surgeon) (1922–2014), British thoracic surgeon
- Donald Roe Ross (1922–2013), United States federal judge
- Donald Ross, Lord Ross (1927–2025), Lord Justice Clerk of Scotland
- Donald E. Ross (1930–2021), American engineer
- Donald Kemp Ross (1943–2022), American lawyer and co-author with Ralph Nader of the book Action for a Change
- Donald Ross (writer) (1942–2018), American comedy screenwriter and playwright; husband of Patti Deutsch
- Donald E. Ross (academic administrator) (fl. 1970s–2000s), former president of Lynn University

== See also ==
- Don Ross (disambiguation)
- Donaldo Ross (1904–1972), Uruguayan football player and coach
