= Tara McGowan-Ross =

Canadian writer and artist (born 1992)

- Born: May 1, 1992 (age 34); Toronto, Ontario, Canada
- Education: Concordia University
- Occupations: Writer, poet and artist
- Relatives: Don Ross (father)
- Writing career
- Genres: Poetry, memoir

Tara McGowan-Ross (born May 1, 1992) is a Canadian multidisciplinary artist, writer, editor and poet.

== Background ==
The daughter of guitarist Don Ross, McGowan-Ross was born in Toronto. Her mother died of breast cancer when she was young. At age 17, she moved to Halifax, where she finished high school. She later moved to Montreal, Quebec and studied philosophy at Concordia University.

McGowan-Ross is Mi'kmaw.

== Works ==
McGowan-Ross is the author of three books: two collections of poetry — Girth and Scorpion Season — and a memoir, Nothing Will Be Different.

Her 2021 memoir Nothing Will Be Different was shortlisted for 2022 Hilary Weston Writers' Trust Prize for Nonfiction.

== Personal life ==
McGowan-Ross is married; her husband is a painter.
