= Fates (album) =

Album by Erik Mongrain

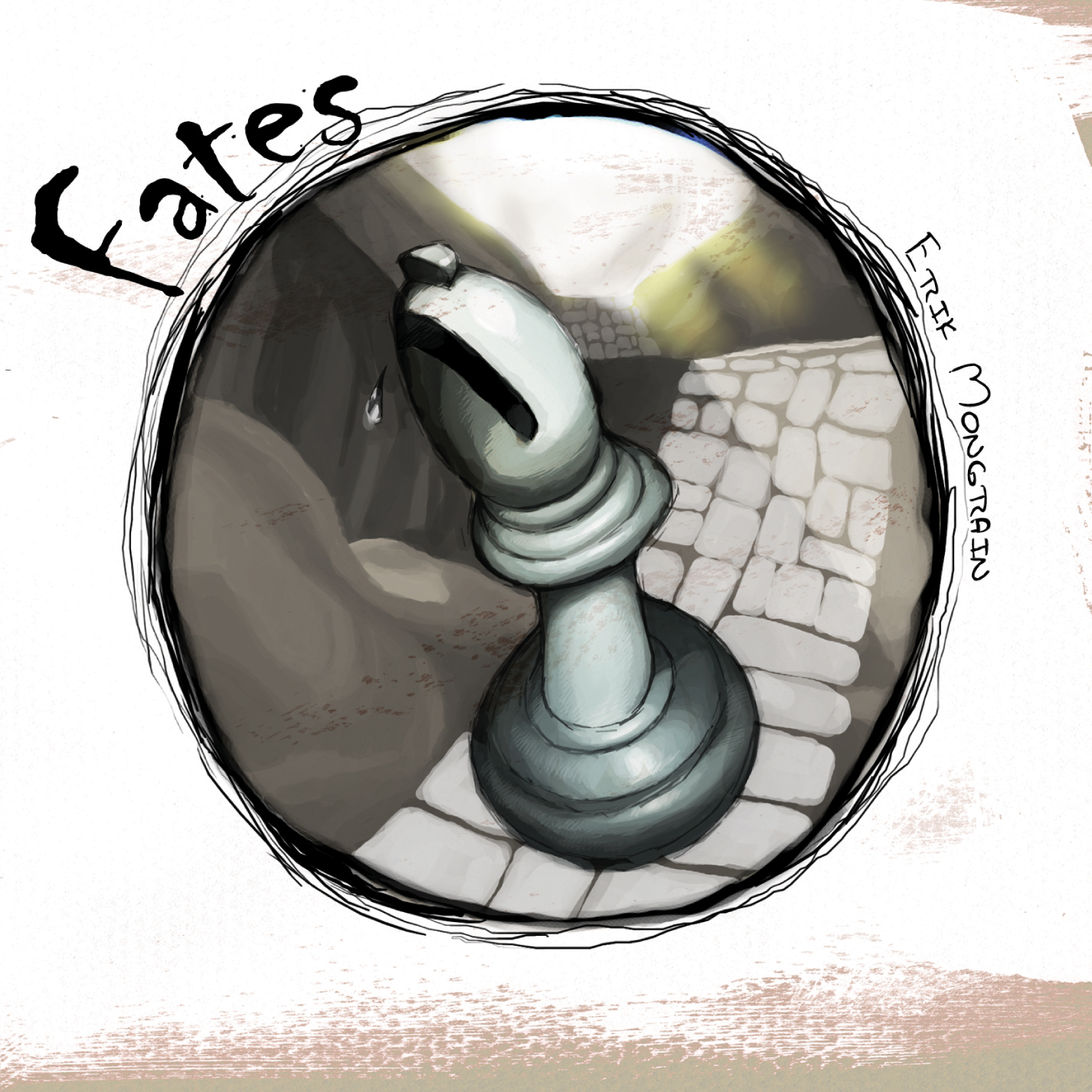

Studio album by Erik Mongrain
- Released: December 2006
- Recorded: 2006
- Genre: Instrumental
- Length: 42min 10s
- Label: Prophase Music
- Producer: Alter Ego Musique

Erik Mongrain chronology
Fates (2006)	Equilibrium (2008)

Professional ratings
Review scores
Source	Rating
AllMusic	3.5/5 stars
Q	4/5 stars
Rolling Stone	3.5/5 stars

Fates is the first album by Canadian guitarist Erik Mongrain. Released in December 2006, Fates contains ten songs including "AirTap!", "PercussienFa", "I Am Not", "Fusions" and "La Dernière Pluie". The album was produced by Serge Fiori.

Mongrain worked on the album for over two years, which was released worldwide in June 2007. The CD cover shows a chess bishop, drawn by Yan Mongrain, the guitarist's brother.

== Track listing ==
1. "PercussienFa" – 3:53
2. "Fates" – 4:59
3. "La Dernière Pluie" – 3:14
4. "Fusions – 3:24
5. "Géométrie D'une Erreur" – 4:40
6. "Mais Quand?" – 4:41
7. "AirTap!" – 3:48
8. "Confusion" #8 – 3:27
9. "Interprétations" – 4:17
10. "I Am Not" – 5:29

== Tracks translations and meanings ==
From CD booklet, written by Mongrain

1. "PercussienFa" (Neologism « Percussion on Fa ») – None explanations nor reasons but percussions of joy, discoveries and improvisations of a chosen musical structure!
2. "Fates" – I do not believe in destiny, chance does not exist... All is synchrony. Nothings happens for nothing, everything has its purpose, even the smallest thing! My vision it is, not necessarily yours! Here is however my ode to this synchrony called life.
3. "La dernière pluie" (from French : The last rain) – I love rain, I am rain's fool... I imagines what would be one last day on earth, with on last rain..!
4. "Fusions" – An utopian scenario! Two beings meeting by a canicular day, amidst a lively crowd. Their sight cross each other's, fusing from inside. Then scattered away from within the multitude.
5. "Géométrie d'une erreur" (from French : Geometry Of An Error) – A beautiful mistake of judgement from deep inside... Oh how can we hasty when passion flows about!
6. "Mais Quand?" (from French : But When?) – A French proverb states : "We harvest what we sow!" And me questioning: "But when?"
7. "AirTap!" – St-Sebastian, Spain, 9 AM. Sitting on stone stairs, underneath the shades of a tree. A pure sun edging out through the leaves, drawing crests of light. My coffee on my left and my guitar on my knees. It's with a heart filled with joy that these melodies came to me... and I played!
8. "Confusion #8" – There are many types of confusions, sad or grey, frenetic or joyful... Here is one I have lived. A confusion in which one could lose his mind, every choice appearing to me as either a good one or perhaps the bad one. For in the end not chose anything!
9. "Interprétations" – The amplitude that can create one interpretation, be it true or false.
10. "I am not" – Interrogations without any rationality and without any apparent reasons that assaulted me, suddenly, as if possessed by some force. A mental combat against a voice that states the opposite of what you've always been!
