= IVideosongs =

Online music instruction service

iVideosongs
- Type: Private company
- Industry: Music
- Founded: Georgia, United States of America (2007)
- Headquarters: Alpharetta, Georgia, United States of America
- Key people: Tim Gilbert, President & CEO 2010 and Tim Huffman, Co-Founder 2007
- Website: ivideosongs.com

iVideosongs, owned by Songmaster Studios Education LLC, is an online music instruction service where original artists show how to play the songs they have written and performed. The site also has song instruction from studio musicians and from professional music instructors. The company slogan is "We'll show you how to play complete songs accurately."

== Overview ==
iVideosongs lets users choose a skill level and genre, then download the high-definition video to their personal computer, iPod, iPad or other device. Each song title is presented in chapter format, so users learn the introduction, verse, chorus, bridge, outro and other elements. Each title includes a master performance, so participants can compare their progress against the song, and tablature notation to aid in learning.

For its iVideosongs products, Songmaster has licensed full rights to songs from BMG Music Publishing, EMI Music Publishing, Sony/ATV Music Publishing, Universal Music Publishing Group, Warner/Chappell Music as well as dozens of secondary and tertiary publishers, and pays royalties to stakeholders. This allows the company to provide complete and accurate instructional titles, presented exactly as they were originally written and performed, such as a lesson with Rush guitarist Alex Lifeson teaching students to play the song "Tom Sawyer". The iVideosongs titles are primarily for electric and acoustic guitarists, but titles for bass, keyboards and drums are also included in the catalog.

The Songmaster Websites have free tutorials to help beginning musicians develop proficiency in techniques such as slide guitar, playing chordal fills and walking bass lines. Beginning tutorials are also offered as a podcast through iTunes.

== History ==
iVideosongs was first launched on January 29, 2008 at the DEMO 08 conference in Palm Desert, California. Later that year, iVideosongs became one of the top 10 most subscribed podcasts on iTunes. iVideosongs got its start in Atlanta, GA, co-founded by Andy Morton and Grammy-nominated musician Tim Huffman.

iVideosongs was acquired by Songmaster Studios Education LLC in 2011. Based in Jupiter, Florida, Songmaster Studios produces and distributes a catalog of about 230 iVideosongs titles from its websites and through Apple's iTunes, Viacom's Rockband, Amazon, Alfred Publishing and other partners.

== Featured artists ==
Songmaster's featured artists include:

- Pierre Bensusan
- Jeff Carlisi
- D.J. Fontana
- Jon Foreman
- Russ Kunkel
- Sharon Isbin
- Chuck Leavell
- Mark Lee
- Alex Lifeson
- John McEuen
- Jim Messina
- Scotty Moore
- Graham Nash
- Ryan Newell
- John Oates
- Kim Richey

Instructors iVideosongs instructors include:

- Danny Grady
- Steve Rieck
- Rob Schumann
- Alex Winfield
