= Pat Kirtley =

American musician (born 1952)

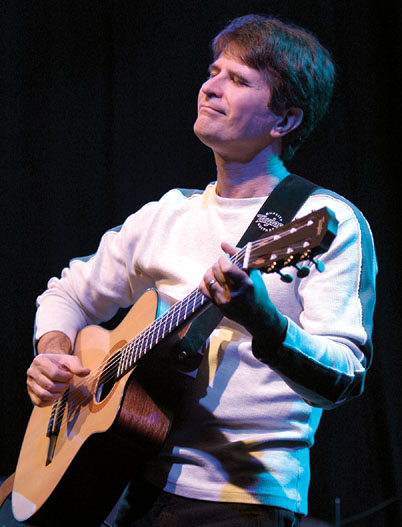
- Kirtley performing in 2005

Background information
- Born: 1952 (age 73–74); Kentucky, United States
- Genre: Fingerstyle guitar
- Occupations: Musician, studio engineer, composer
- Instrument: Guitar
- Years active: 1992–present
- Website: Pat Kirtley at MySpace

Pat Kirtley (born 1952) is an American fingerstyle guitarist, composer and guitar educator.

== Biography ==
Pat Kirtley was born in 1952 in Kentucky. He grew up in a musical Kentucky family. As a child he was exposed to the musical influences of his mother's family – listening to country and bluegrass – and his father's family who were more attracted to pop and classical music.

In his teenage years he was also drawn to recording and its technology. By age 13, he had acquired a tape recorder and had become interested in electronics, not just using the equipment, but teaching himself how to build and modify it. He soon began experimenting with tone modification and looping techniques on his recorder and took his early steps in recording with some of his first, never to be published compositions as a 14-year-old.

While always an ardent guitar player, Kirtley began his professional career on the other side of the microphone, working as a studio engineer and producer for twelve years beginning in the mid-70's. He continued playing and creating his compositions, but never published them or pursued working professionally as a guitarist until around 1989, when he began touring as a solo act. In 1992 he entered the fingerstyle competition at the Walnut Valley Festival in Winfield, Kansas - without notable success. He didn't give up, and won the 1994 National Thumbpicking Contest in Mountain View, Arkansas. That same year, he released his first CD Kentucky Guitar, which earned very positive reviews. The next year, 1995, he went to Winfield for the third time and became the National Fingerstyle Guitar Champion in the Walnut Valley Festival competition.

In 1996, Kirtley was chosen to participate in a project for Narada Records, a CD titled Guitar Fingerstyle, featuring a collection of tracks from leading contemporary acoustic guitar artists. The release was a success for the label, selling nearly a quarter-million copies worldwide. 1997 and 1998 saw Kirtley releasing two more CDs, Irish Guitar and Rural Life. Both contain his own solo guitar compositions, and arrangements of pop and traditional tunes. He then appeared on other artist's CDs as accompanying guitarist and also began developing pieces for a group/duo context, leading up to his CD "Just Listen" (2000), which featured collaborations with Tommy Emmanuel, jazz guitarist Craig Wagner, and acoustic super-group Nickel Creek. The group sound context was further developed on Kirtley's Brazilian Guitar, released in 2002. This CD focuses on Brazilian samba and bossa nova styles and was recorded with an ensemble setting. Here Kirtley's sound comes from the nylon-string guitar instead of his usual steel-string.

He co-authored a book about home recording and writes articles for guitar magazines about guitar technique, recording and other related topics, in magazines such as Electronic Musician, Acoustic Guitar, Onstage, Home Recording, and Wood & Steel, as well as in the German magazine Akustik Gitarre.^{,}

== Influences and technique ==
Kirtley's musical influences are quite diverse. He names among others Chet Atkins, Jerry Reed, Lenny Breau, Merle Travis, Mose Rager, Les Paul, Doc Watson, Antonín Dvořák, Johann Sebastian Bach, Edgar Varèse, Antonio Carlos Jobim, Luis Bonfa, John Cage, Harry Partch, Wendy Carlos, Jimi Hendrix, Bernard Herrmann, Dave Brubeck, Frank Zappa, David Crosby, Wes Montgomery and Keith Jarrett.

In the early years of his career he drew from country and bluegrass sources, but at the close of the '80s he began to explore Irish – Celtic music, using alternate tunings like DADGAD in guitar arrangements of Irish fiddle and airs. Later he ventured to Brazilian and South American music, adding to a repertoire not easily categorized. His compositions are a blend of folk, pop, and other traditions.

Coming from Kentucky, his "finger-" or "thumbpicker"-roots are close to the playing of Chet Atkins, Merle Travis and Doc Watson. Kirtley uses his thumb for a regular and driving alternate bass while playing the melody with the other fingers. This melody is often syncopated and creates a swinging tension in conjunction with the regular alternate bass. Additionally he uses the frailing-technique like a banjo player by lightly brushing several or all strings, alternating down- and upstrokes with bass notes. His bass-lines are meticulously composed and often repeatedly take over parts of the melody. In several of his pieces he uses single note runs build from open and fretted strings creating a very particular sound, mostly in intro- and outro-parts and bridges leading from one part of the piece to the next. Kirtley mainly composes short and clearly structured pieces, containing three choruses, with variations in the second and third chorus and an ending repeating the main melody.

== Guitars and technical equipment ==
On his CDs and in concerts Pat Kirtley uses the following guitars^{,}:

- Martin MC-28
- Martin 00-17 (1952)
- Taylor NS42 Nylon
- Taylor 512-CE
- Taylor 514-C
- Kirk Sand electroacoustic
- Godin Multiac MIDI guitar

His favored Taylor has an EMG magnetic soundhole- pickup with Fishman pickups in other guitars. On stage he mixes the pickup-signal with the input of a good condenser microphone.

In the recording studio he records with microphones and additional effects. Along with the Godin Multiac MIDI guitar he uses a Roland GR-series synthesizer, Lexicon Jamman, and Lexicon and Alesis reverbs.

Kirtley uses a Fred Kelly thumbpick and plays with plastic-reinforced nails. He prefers .012 to .054"-gauge Elixir Phosphor Bronze Light strings.

== Discography ==
Compiled mainly from discography at Funky Music

- 1994 Kentucky Guitar (Mainstring Music)
- 1997 Irish Guitar (Mainstring Music)
- 1998 Rural Life (Mainstring Music)
- 2000 Just Listen (Mainstring Music)
- 2002 Brazilian Guitar (Mainstring Music)
- 2011 December Smiles (Mainstring Music)

=== Collaborations, guest musician ===
- 1999 Before My Time, Todd Hallawell (Soundset)
- 2001 Wanted! Jesse James Alias: Steve Rector, Steve Rector (Hound Sound Music)
- 2004 Exotic America, Andy Robinson (Brontosaurus Records)
- 2005 Contrast, with Pauly Zarb (Pauly Zarb and Pat Kirtley)

=== Compilations ===
- 1996 Guitar Fingerstyle: A Narada Collection (Narada)
- 1997 Dance of the Celts: A Narada Collection (Narada)
- 1997 Masters of Acoustic Guitar (Narada)
- 1998 Celtic Fingerstyle Guitar V. 1: The Blarney Pilgrim (Rounder Records ROUN3157)
- 1998 Celtic Fingerstyle Guitar V. 2: Ramble to Cashel (Rounder Records ROUN3156)
- 1998 Acoustic Guitar Highlights, Vol. 2 (Solid Air)
- 2001 Guitar Fingerstyle 2: A Narada Collection (Narada)

=== Video, DVD ===
- 1998 The Blarney Pilgrim (vestapol 13063dvd)
- 1998 Ramble to Cashel (vestapol 13029dvd)
- 2004 Nine Pound Hammer: Guitar Styles of Western Kentucky (vestapol 13081dvd)
- 2004 Introduction to Thumbstyle Guitar (Mel Bay Productions GW301DVD)
- 2005 Introduction To Alternate Tunings (Mel Bay Productions GW302DVD)
- 2005 Introduction To Celtic Fingerstyle Guitar (Mel Bay Productions GW303DVD)
- 2008 Pickin' Like Chet Vol 1 Guitar (Stefan Grossman's Workshop GW985/6)2-DVD set
- 2008 Pickin' Like Chet Vol 2 Guitar (Stefan Grossman's Workshop GW987/8)2-DVD set

=== Sheet music, books ===
- 1999 Acoustic Guitar Artist Songbook, Vol. 1. String Letter Publishing, ISBN 978-1-890490-03-4
- 2000 Kentucky Guitar. Mel Bay Productions 97331D, ISBN 0-7866-4992-5
- 2000 Master Anthology of Fingerstyle Guitar Solos Vol.1. Mel Bay Productions 98370BCD, ISBN 978-0-7866-5290-7
- 2003 Irish Guitar: Celtic Guitar Solos. Mel Bay Productions 97332, ISBN 978-0-7866-7051-2
- 2006 Home Recording Studio Basics. Mike Levine, David Darlington, Pat Kirtley, Rusty Cutchin (Cherry Lane Music). ISBN 978-1-57560-563-0
