= Wintertide (album) =

Studio album by Don Ross
- Released: 1996
- Genre: Christmas
- Label: Columbia/Sony Canada

Don Ross chronology
| This Dragon Won't Sleep (1995) | Wintertide (1996) | Loaded, Leather, Moonroof (1997) |

Wintertide is an album by the Canadian guitarist Don Ross, released in 1996.

== Reception ==
Professional ratings
Review scores
| Source | Rating |
|---|---|
| Allmusic | 4/5 stars |

Music critic Roch Parisien, writing for Allmusic, wrote the album "[Ross] offers tasteful, often inventive arrangements of English, German, and French traditionals. Some harp, keyboard, trumpet and delicate percussion embellishments apply, but in general the sparser the better here."

== Track listing ==
1. "In the Bleak Midwinter"
2. "The First Noel"
3. "What Child Is This"
4. "Bring a Torch, Jeanette Isabella"
5. "Silent Night"
6. "Lo, How a Rose E’er Blooming"
7. "Once in Royal David’s City"
8. "O Come, O Come, Emmanuel"
9. "Jesu, Joy of Man's Desiring" (Johann Sebastian Bach)
10. "Huron Carol"
11. "God Rest You Merry Gentlemen"
12. "The Coventry Carol"

== Personnel ==
- Don Ross – guitar
