= DADGAD =

Guitar tuning associated with Celtic music

DADGAD tuning

D A D G A D, or Celtic tuning, is an alternative guitar tuning most associated with Celtic music, though it has also found use in rock, folk, metal and several other genres. Instead of the standard tuning (E_{2} A_{2} D_{3} G_{3} B_{3} E_{4}) the six guitar strings are tuned, from low to high, D_{2} A_{2} D_{3} G_{3} A_{3} D_{4} .

Tuning to D A D G A D from standard is accomplished by tuning the first, (Note: Counting the highest pitched string, E_{4}, as 1st, and the lowest pitched string, E_{2}, as 6th.) second, and sixth strings down a whole tone (two frets). The result is an open D, suspended fourth chord. Being suspended, the open tuning is neither intrinsically major nor minor.

== History ==
D A D G A D was popularized by British folk guitarist Davey Graham.

Inspired by hearing an oud player in Morocco, Graham experimented with detuning some of the guitar's strings from standard tuning (E_{2} A_{2} D_{3} G_{3} B_{3} E_{4}), arriving at D_{2} A_{2} D_{3} G_{3} A_{3} D_{4} or D A D G A D . He employed the tuning to great effect in his treatments of Celtic music, but also the folk music of India and Morocco. The first guitarists in Irish traditional music to use the tuning were Mícheál Ó Domhnaill and Dáithí Sproule.

Other proponents of the tuning include Roy Harper, John Martyn, Ben Howard, Andy Mckee, Russian Circles, Mike Dawes, Alejandro Aranda, Rory Gallagher, Luka Bloom, Stan Rogers, Jimmy Page (The Yardbirds' "White Summer" and Led Zeppelin's "Black Mountain Side" and "Kashmir" use this tuning), Neil Young, Artie Traum, Pierre Bensusan, Eric Roche, Midnight, Laurence Juber, Tony McManus, Stephen Wake, Bert Jansch, Richard Thompson, Dick Gaughan, Alistair Hulett, Steve von Till (along with its modified form, A A D G A D), Imaad Wasif, Mark Kozelek, Jeff Tweedy, Masaaki Kishibe, Paul McSherry, Acle Kahney (uses a 7 string variation, B♭ F B♭ E♭ F B♭ E♭ ), Sevendust (although downtuned), Kotaro Oshio, Ben Chasny, Al Petteway, Justin Currie, Lankum and Trey Anastasio. English folk musician Martin Carthy now mostly uses a related tuning, C G C D G A, whose evolution from E A D G B E he describes explicitly in his 1987 book.

"Upon This Mountain"
Instrumental folk song in D A D G A D guitar tuning by The Fitzcarraldos

The suitability of D A D G A D to Celtic music stems from the fact that it facilitates the use of a number of moveable chords, which retain open strings. These act as a drone on either the bass or treble strings, approximating the voicings used in traditional Scottish and Irish pipe music.

== See also ==
- List of guitar tunings
