= Equilibrium (Erik Mongrain album) =

Erik Mongrain album

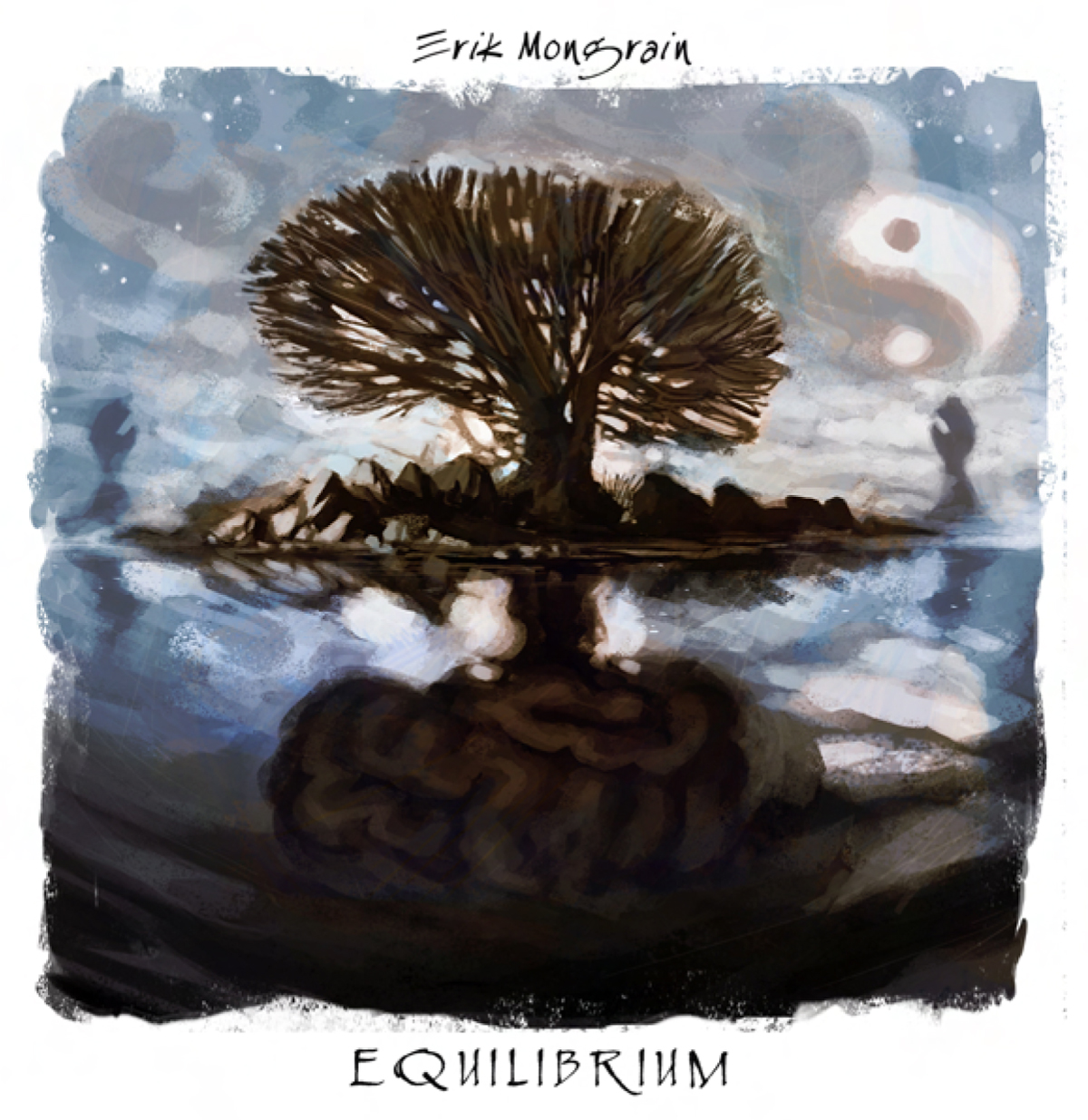

Studio album by Erik Mongrain
- Released: October 2008; May 13, 2009 (JP)
- Recorded: August 2008
- Genre: Acoustic
- Length: 40min 24s
- Labels: Alter Ego Musique, Prophase Music; Dreamusic Incorporated (JP)
- Producer: Alter Ego Musique

Erik Mongrain chronology
Fates (2006)	Equilibrium (2008)

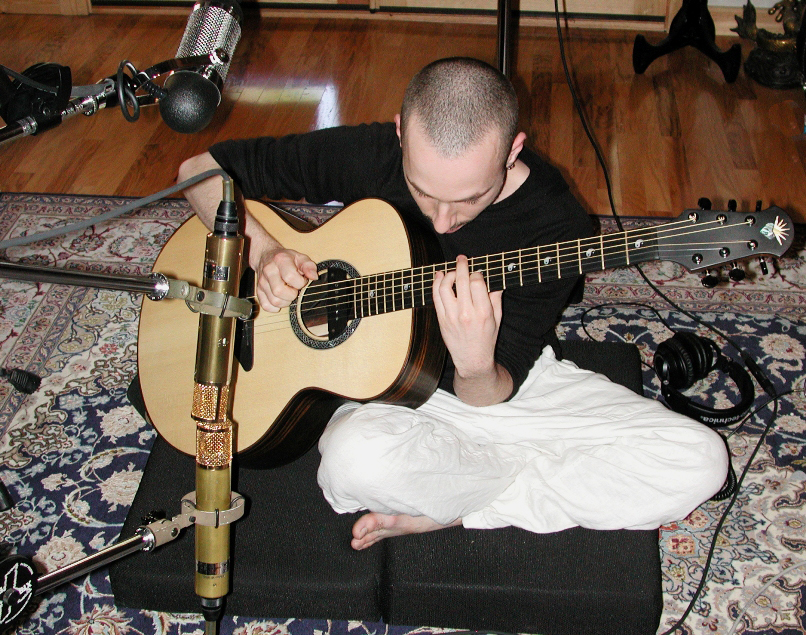
Erik Mongrain while recording the album Equilibrium at Paul Reed Smith's personal studio.

Equilibrium is the second album of the Canadian guitarist Erik Mongrain.

== Description ==
Equilibrium is an acoustic guitar album by Erik Mongrain, recorded at Paul Reed Smith's Dragon Crossing Studios in August 2008. Mongrain is accompanied by Michael Manring (fretless bass) and Bill Plumber (synthesizer).

The CD cover is a painting by Yan Mongrain, the guitarist's brother.

== Tracks listing ==
1. "A Ripple Effect" - 2:22
2. "Alone In The Mist" - 5:24
3. "Equilibrium" - 5:06
4. "Muse" - 5:17
5. "The Silent Fool" - 4:20
6. "Pandora's Box" - 4:07
7. "Eon's Illusion" - 4:09
8. "Raindigger" - 4:03
9. "Maelström" - 5:31

== Tracks translations and meanings ==
(from CD booklet, written by Erik's hand)

1. "A Ripple Effect"
I have a hyperactive mind. There is no switch to turn it off. One thought leading to another, it never ends...
2. "Alone In The Mist"
This how I feel when something or someone triggers the ultimate inner loneliness.
3. "Equilibrium"
An ode to the balance and imbalance of life, human nature and our planet. The Yin-Yang that is to live.
4. "Muse"
A love story that it should be but it can't be.
5. "The Silent Fool"
For all the moments in my life that I spoke too quickly, uncontrollably or stupidly. Living with regrets is harsh... Sometimes I just wish that I was mute!
6. "Pandora's Box"
When you receive a new guitar, there is always the magic of discovering how it sounds on every move you can think of. Although you've tried it first or figured out how it should sound, you truly never know exactly what you're going to get! Just like the Pandora's box, everything could pop out of it!
7. "Eon's Illusion"
A minute can be an eternity. This is a period of my life when I had to wait for a guitar in construction and my apartment in renovation. It seems to me it took forever when I was plunged into it, but now that I look back, it wasn't as bad as I thought it was! The illusion of time is tricky...
8. "Raindigger"
There are times in life when we try to reach for something or someone that we know will remain out of our grasp regardless of how fast we try to run for it. Try to picture yourself running with abandon into the night, your whole body slashed by rain and wind, reaching out as far as you can to try and get a glimpse of your goal...
9. "Maelström"
Ever been confused by love and all the choices it can lay upon you ? Confusion, like a maelstrom, can and will most likely swallow everything in its path... including part of your sanity!
