= Andy McKee =

American musician (born 1979)

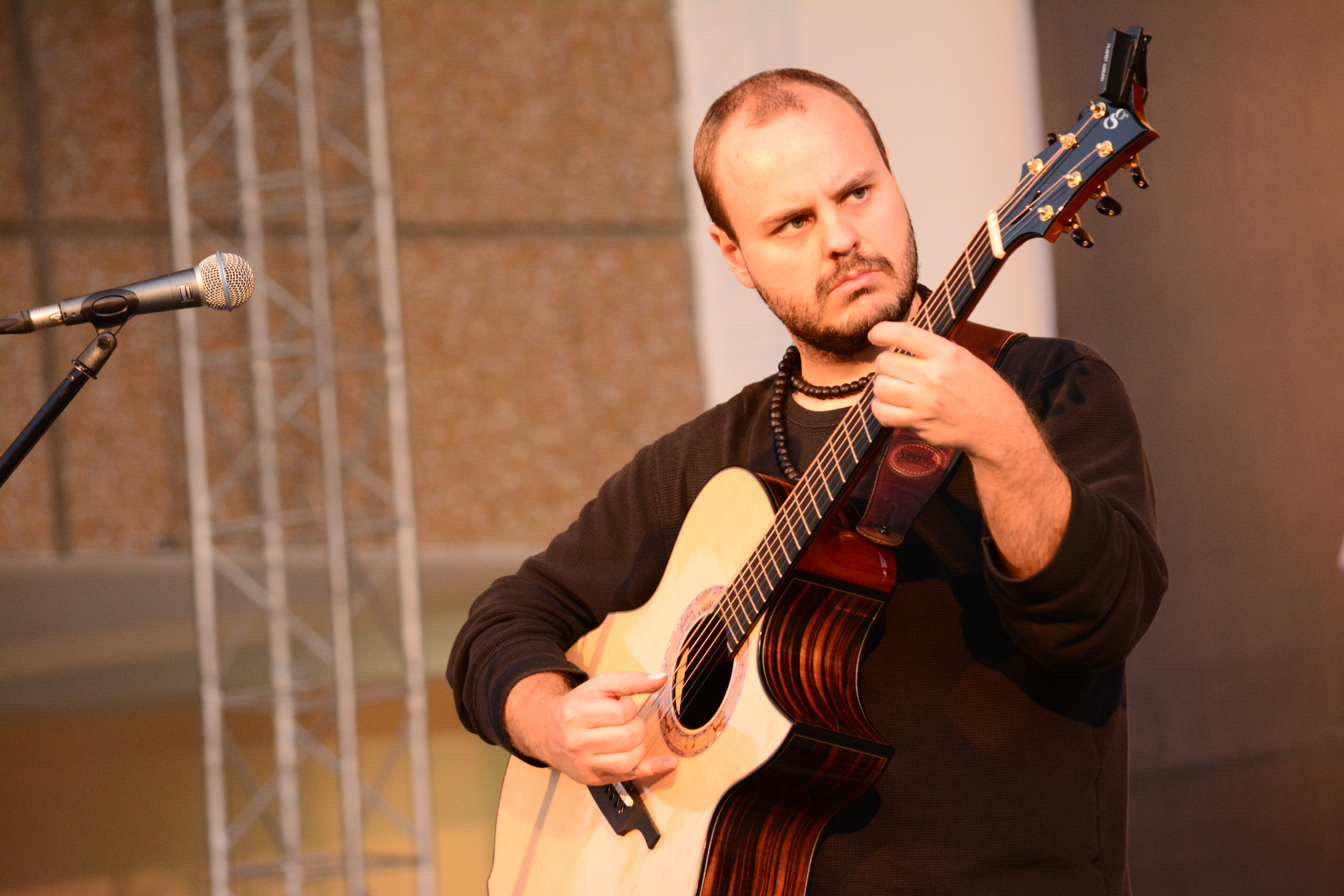
- McKee performing in 2014

Background information
- Born: April 4, 1979 (age 47); Topeka, Kansas, U.S.
- Genres: Folk, fingerstyle, percussive fingerstyle
- Occupation: Guitarist
- Instruments: Guitar, baritone guitar, harp guitar
- Years active: 2001–present
- Labels: Razor & Tie, CandyRat, Mythmaker
- Website: www.andymckee.com

Andy McKee (born April 4, 1979, in Topeka, Kansas) is an American fingerstyle guitar player who has released six studio albums, three extended plays, and one live album to date. A number of YouTube videos featuring McKee's highly-technical guitar performances have achieved viral fame, garnering hundreds of millions of views collectively.

== Life and career ==
McKee played his first guitar, an Aria nylon string bought by his father, at age 13. Initially underwhelmed by his guitar lessons, McKee began teaching himself how to play guitar. He began learning shred guitar music, including songs by Metallica, Eric Johnson, and Joe Satriani. McKee's electric guitar-playing cousin inspired him to continue learning, taking him out for his 16th birthday to see a guitarist named Preston Reed perform live at a clinic. McKee later bought an instructional videotape from Reed and began to learn many of his acoustic guitar techniques from it. Later that year, with his mother's permission, he obtained his GED in order to quit attending high school and play more guitar. He began to be influenced by primarily acoustic guitarists such as Michael Hedges, Billy McLaughlin, Pat Kirtley, and from Passion Session by Don Ross, as he continued studying the instrument on his own.

=== Nocturne (2001) ===
In 2001, McKee independently released his first album, Nocturne. That same year, he was placed third at the National Fingerstyle Guitar Competition in Winfield, Kansas. In 2003, McKee toured in Taiwan with Jacques Stotzem, Isato Nakagawa, and Masaaki Kishibe, and earned first place in the Miscellaneous Acoustic Instrument contest of the New Jersey State Fiddling and Picking Championships with a Ron Spillers harp guitar he purchased from Stephen Bennett in 2002.^{,} The instrument can be heard in a number of his songs on later albums, such as Into the Ocean and Gates of Gnomeria. Only 1,000 copies of Nocturne were ever produced and the album is now out of circulation.

=== Dreamcatcher (2004) ===
McKee released his second album, Dreamcatcher, in 2004. The album includes his cover of Toto's "Africa" and "Theme from Schindler's List," as well as a harp guitar tribute to Michael Hedges entitled "The Friend I Never Met." McKee used the title track to win the opportunity to perform with bassist Michael Manring, with whom he has since toured repeatedly. He placed second in the Fingerstyle Guitar Competition of the Canadian Guitar Festival that year. The album was later re-released by McKee's label in response to the popularity he garnered on YouTube.

=== Art of Motion (2005) ===
McKee's third CD, Art of Motion, was released on Candyrat Records in November 2005. Most of McKee's YouTube performances appear on the album, along with a handful of tracks carried over from Dreamcatcher. During the early stages of McKee's success on YouTube in late 2006 and early 2007, Art of Motion was the only album of his carried by Candyrat Records, and saw the most mainstream exposure as a result.

=== The Gates of Gnomeria (2007) ===
After his popularity due to his performances on YouTube and touring throughout much of 2007, McKee returned to the studio to record his fourth CD, The Gates of Gnomeria. The album contained six new songs, four songs which had been previously released on McKee's Nocturne album, as well as two cover songs. McKee spent the majority of 2008 on tour throughout the world, performing with other Candyrat artists.

=== The Thing That Came From Somewhere (2008) ===
In 2008, McKee released a collaborative album with Don Ross, entitled The Thing That Came From Somewhere. He also released a split DVD that same year with labelmate Antoine Dufour, each artist contributing eight songs to the disc; two of McKee's from Gates of Gnomeria.

=== Common Ground EP (2009) ===
In between touring, and helping promote his duo guitar record with Don Ross, McKee recorded an EP of two re-recordings of songs from his Dreamcatcher album, and a cover song by Japanese guitarist Masaaki Kishibe. The album was released digitally only, along with videos available on iTunes that include his performance of his two compositions.

=== Joyland (2010) ===
McKee announced in May 2009 that he intended to finish touring in the second half of the year and concentrate on recording his upcoming album. He stated in July 2009 that it would most likely be titled "Joyland", the title track of the album which originally went under the name "Music For A Vacant Amusement Park." The song was inspired by an amusement park in Topeka, Kansas named Boyle's Joyland that was open from 1951 to 1988. The album was completed in November 2009 and released digitally on March 23, 2010, with a physical release following on March 30, 2010 through Razor & Tie. In the background on the album cover is an image of the "Whacky Shack" at Wichita's Joyland Amusement Park (closed 2006). According to McKee, "On this album I've branched out a bit and included some instrumentation on a couple of songs. There's also a new harpguitar tune and a couple of covers such as "Layover" by Michael Hedges and Tears for Fears' "Everybody Wants to Rule the World." The album also features a DVD full of 75 minutes worth of additional video material, including a documentary called Andy McKee: Joyland and four new performance music videos directed by Jeremy Osbern.

=== Mythmaker EP (2014) ===
McKee maintained a prolific worldwide touring schedule for several years after the release of "Joyland," including tours with Antoine Dufour, Trevor Gordon Hall, Stephen Bennett, Jon Gomm, Eric Johnson, Peppino D'Agostino, Preston Reed, and others. On April 8, 2014, McKee released "Mythmaker," a four-song EP of new original material that included his first-ever solo piano composition ("June") and made use of electric guitar ("Lumine").

=== Live Book (2016) ===
In December 2015, McKee professionally recorded live shows at The Melting Point in Athens, GA, the Red Clay Music Foundry in Duluth, GA, and Workplay in Birmingham, AL, which he then edited together and released as his first ever live record, entitled "Live Book," on March 8, 2016.

=== Symbol EP (2021) ===
Beginning in 2020, due to the shuttering of the live touring industry during the COVID-19 pandemic, McKee began livestreaming weekly concerts to his fans through Facebook Live (dubbed "McKee Mondays") and offering online guitar instruction through TrueFire, as well as dedicated one-on-one lessons. In June 2021, McKee performed his first live show since the start of the pandemic in Nashville, Tennessee and announced his first release of new music since 2014's "Mythmaker," beginning with a six-track EP of cover songs entitled "Symbol" to be released on September 17, 2021. The first single from the EP, a cover of "Ragamuffin" by Michael Hedges, was released on July 15, 2021.

== Career progression ==
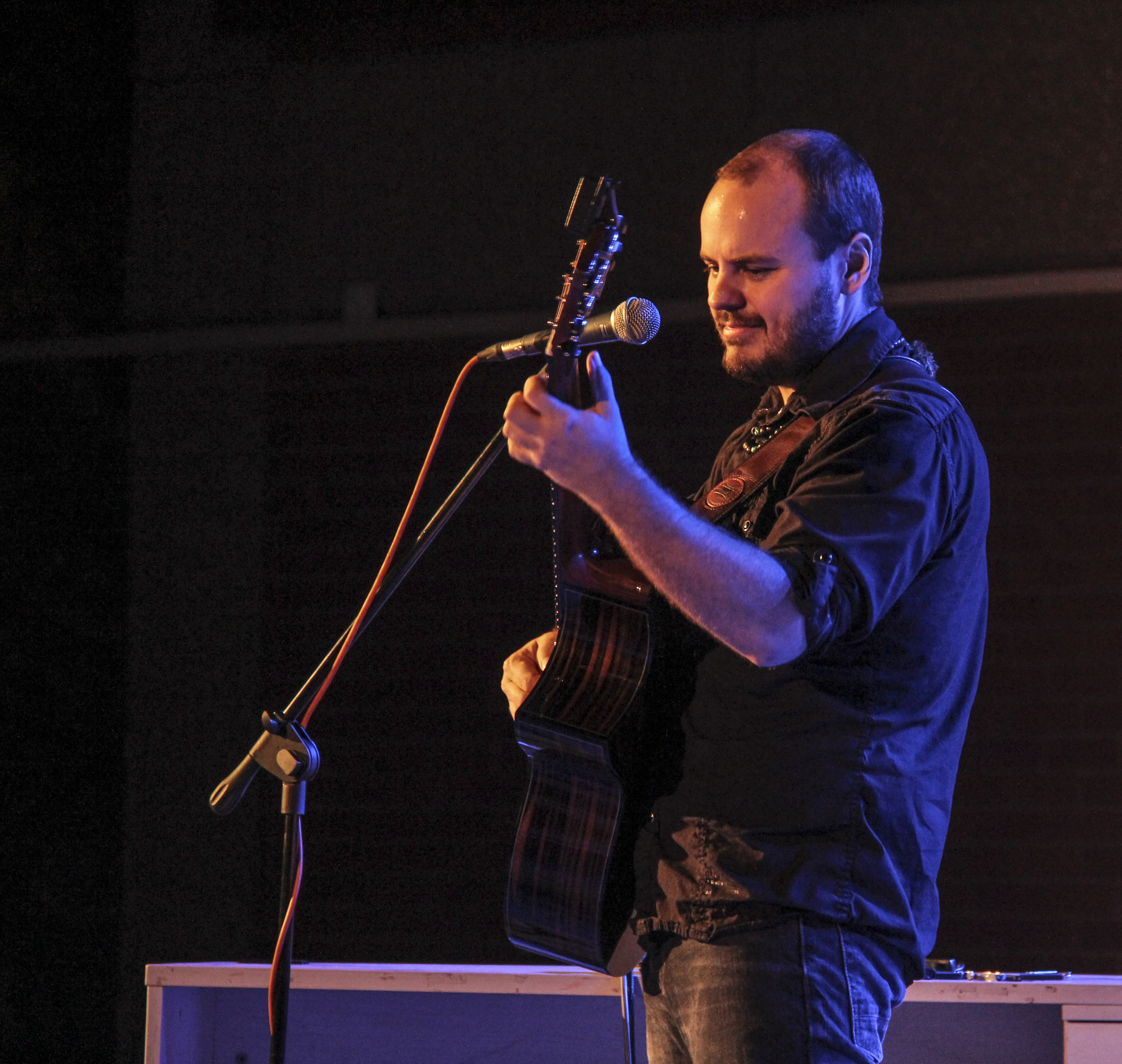
McKee at Glenn Gould Studio in Toronto, Ontario

Self-described as "just this guy from Topeka, Kansas, who kind of blew up on the Internet about a week before Christmas", McKee became one of Candyrat Records' best-selling artists after their video of "Drifting" was promoted by users at Digg. For a time, three of McKee's videos were concurrently the three most-watched on YouTube. In the wake of this exposure, he appeared by invitation on Woodsongs as well as Last Call with Carson Daly. He also contributed to Josh Groban's 2007 Grammy-nominated Christmas album, Noël, playing guitar on the song "Little Drummer Boy". Groban's album went on to become the best-selling CD of 2007 in the U.S., hitting #1 on the U.S. Billboard 200.

In 2010, McKee contributed to Lee Ritenour's CD 6 String Theory that also features guitarists like Steve Lukather, Slash, Neal Schon, Tal Wilkenfeld, and Mike Stern.

In 2012, McKee played alongside Prince on his Welcome 2 Australia tour. He played with Prince's band during the concert on Purple Rain, Sometimes It Snows in April, Mountains, Dance Electric, and Love, Thy Will Be Done. He also kicked off the Melbourne concert with Ebon Coast, Drifting, and The Friend I Never Met.

In 2016, McKee began developing and hosting a series of multi-day guitar workshops (or "boot camps") through Dreamcatcher Events. His first flagship boot camp, "Andy McKee's Musicarium," was hosted at the Full Moon Resort in Big Indian, New York (2016), with subsequent Musicariums being held at the EarthRise Institute in Petaluma, California (2018-2019) and the Hyatt Regency Sonoma Wine Country in Santa Rosa, California (2021).

== Equipment and influences ==
McKee has used the following equipment:

- Greenfield G4 and G2 Guitars
- Greenfield HG1.2 Harp Guitar
- Ernie Ball Music Man Electric Guitars – Steve Morse, Luke III and John Petrucci models
- Ernie Ball Everlast Coated Phosphor Bronze Acoustic Strings – Medium
- Shubb Capos
- Lance McCollum Baritone Guitar
- Ron Spillers Harp Guitar
- K&K Sound Pickups (internal)
- DTAR Solstice Pre-Amp
- T.C. Electronics Reverb
- König & Meyer Heli A-Guitar Stand

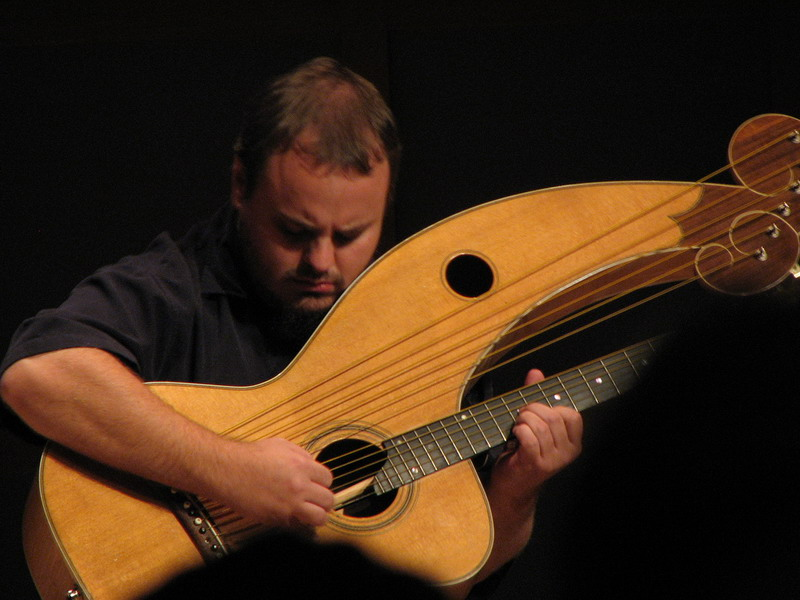
McKee at Glenn Gould Studio in Toronto, Ontario (2008)

McKee's influences include: Eric Johnson, Dream Theater, Michael Hedges, Preston Reed, Billy McLaughlin, Tommy Emmanuel, Björk, Steve Lukather, Metallica, Joe Satriani, Iron Maiden, Pantera, Vince DiCola, Toto, Peter Gabriel, Imogen Heap, King Crimson, Primus, Pat Metheny, and Don Ross.

McKee began listening to metal, such as Dream Theater, at an early age. He described on Woodsongs how he was a "metal freak" during childhood, even performing a Metallica song in his high school talent show. It was not until he saw Preston Reed that his influences began to shift towards acoustic songwriters such as Don Ross and Michael Hedges. Both walks of music continue to influence him, though he has stuck with acoustic music in his professional life.

An integral part of McKee's style of guitar playing is the use of alternate and open tunings, often combined with a regular and/or a banjo capo.

== Discography ==
Album title	Year
Nocturne	2001
Dreamcatcher	2004
Art of Motion	2005
The Gates of Gnomeria	2007
Split DVD with Antoine Dufour	2007
The Thing That Came From Somewhere with Don Ross	2008
Common Ground (EP)	2009
Joyland	2010
Mythmaker (EP)	2014
Live Book	2016
Symbol (EP)	2021
Pulse (EP)	2023
