= Altiplanos =

Studio album by Pierre Bensusan
- Released: May 3, 2005
- Recorded: 1998 – 2004
- Studio: Studio du Chien qui Tourne, Chateau-Thierry, France
- Genre: New Age, jazz, folk
- Length: 59:51
- Label: Favored Nations
- Producer: Pierre Bensusan

Altiplanos is Pierre Bensusan's sixth album, recorded between 1998 and 2004.

== Track listing ==
All songs by Pierre Bensusan, except Demain, dès l'Aube, by Victor Hugo and Pierre Bensusan, La Nuit des Météores Dotea Comu-Bensusan and Pierre Bensusan, Tacita Didier Malherbe and Pierre Bensusan.

1. "Sentimentales Pyromaniaques" – 2:41
2. "La Dame de Clevedon" – 5:13
3. "Sur un Fil" – 1:53
4. "Altiplanos" – 5:07
5. "Demain, dès l'Aube" – 5:49
6. "Scarabée" – 5:34
7. "If Only You Knew" – 3:42
8. "Hymn 11" – 4:30
9. "Long World" – 3:32
10. "Nefertari" – 3:58
11. "Sylva" – 2:29
12. "La Nuit des Météores" – 4:56
13. "Falafel à Montségur" – 7:28
14. "Tacita" – 3:36
15. "Chant de Nuit" – 2:27

== Personnel ==
- Pierre Bensusan – guitar, vocals, double bass, udu, percussion
- Blaise Boutlefeu – djembe, flute, percussion
- Michel Benita – contrabass, clavier keyboards
- Didier Malherbe – duduk
