= Robot Monster (album) =

Studio album by Don Ross
- Released: August 5, 2003
- Label: Narada/Virgin
- Producer: Don Ross, Christophe Bendel

Don Ross chronology
Huron Street (2001)	Robot Monster (2003)	Music for Vacuuming (2005)

Robot Monster is the ninth album by Canadian guitarist Don Ross, released in 2003. It is his third and final recording on the Narada/Virgin label. The album takes its title from the science-fiction film of the same name.

== Reception ==
Professional ratings
Review scores
Source	Rating
AllMusic	3/5 stars
Minor 7th	(no rating)

Music critic Mark Deming, writing for AllMusic, wrote "The disc is mostly balanced between the sort of aggressive, mojo-working-again kind of optimistic intensity and more reflective ballads that show a heart in the healing process. Knowing the story of his wife's passing from cancer makes the lush, languid, steel guitar-enhanced "Goodbye Kelly Goodbye" a true tearjerker." Critic Bernard Richter praised the album and wrote "Each one of the 12 tunes has a strong musical foundation, and the listener—while taken aback because of Ross' sheer virtuosity—is easily pulled into the music itself."

== Track listing ==
All songs by Don Ross except as noted.

1. "Robot Monster" – 4:22
2. "It's Fun Being Lucky" – 4:57
3. "So Much Time" (Don Ross, Christoph Bendel) – 5:03
4. "Elevation Music" – 3:16
5. "Dracula and Friends (Part One)" – 4:13
6. "June" – 5:05
7. "I Think of You" (Don Ross, Christoph Bendel) – 4:56
8. "Bubble Radio" – 3:53
9. "Dracula and Friends (Part Two)" – 3:17
10. "Fader Jones" – 4:41
11. "Goodbye Kelly Goodbye" – 3:26
12. "Oh Baby" (Don Ross, Christoph Bendel) – 5:00

== Personnel ==
- Don Ross – guitar, vocals, piano, sampling
- Andrew Craig – piano
- Colleen Allen – soprano sax
- Jordan O'Connor – upright bass
- Matthew Shawn Fleming - percussion

== Production Notes ==
- Produced by Don Ross and Christophe Bendel
- Engineered by Ron Skinner
- Mastered by Trevor Sadler
