= Loaded, Leather, Moonroof =

Studio album by Don Ross
- Released: November 14, 1997
- Label: Columbia/Sony Canada

Don Ross chronology
| Wintertide (1996) | Loaded, Leather, Moonroof (1997) | Passion Session (1999) |

Loaded, Leather, Moonroof is an album by Canadian guitarist Don Ross, released in 1997. Ross plays 6 and 7-string guitar and dobro on this release.

It was rated four out of five stars by L'Acadie Nouvelle.

== Track listing ==
All songs by Don Ross except as noted.

1. "Loaded, Leather, Moonroof"
2. "Meanwhile Road"
3. "Jesse Helms' Night in Havana"
4. "Sweet Sister"
5. "Carolan's Quarrel With the Landlady/Michael and Juliana"
6. "Jerry's Front Porch"
7. "Can't Find My Way Home"
8. "Wave From Your WIndow"
9. "Bruyere"
10. "Meanwhile Road (reprise)"

== Personnel ==
- Don Ross – guitar
