= This Dragon Won't Sleep =

Studio album by Don Ross
- Released: 1995
- Label: Columbia/Sony Canada

Don Ross chronology
Three Hands (1992)	This Dragon Won't Sleep (1995)	Wintertide (1996)

This Dragon Won't Sleep is a recording by Canadian guitarist Don Ross, released in 1995. It is his first for Columbia/Sony Canada. It features full band arrangements on most of the songs and a few solo guitar pieces.

== Track listing ==
1. "Godzilla"
2. "Head & Heart"
3. "Obrigado (Egberto)"
4. "This Dragon Won't Sleep"
5. "Yoyomama"
6. "Any Colour But Blue"
7. "Groovy Sunflowers"
8. "Afraid to Dance"
9. "Tierra Maya"
10. "Catherine"
11. "Au jardin D'Amour"
12. "Big Steps in Little Shoes"
13. "Zarzuela"

== Personnel ==
- Don Ross – guitar
