= Huron Street (album) =

Studio album by Don Ross
- Released: 2001
- Label: Narada/Virgin

Don Ross chronology
Passion Session (1999)	Huron Street (2001)	Robot Monster (2003)

Huron Street is the eighth album by Canadian guitarist Don Ross, released in 2001. The twelve compositions in this collection were all released previously, some on collections that were only available in Canada. They were all newly recorded for this release. It reached number nine on the Billboard Top New Age Albums chart.

== Reception ==
Professional ratings
Review scores
Source	Rating
Minor 7th	(no rating)

Minor 7th wrote the album "[Ross] revisits twelve fingerstyle tunes he wrote when just embarking on a life journey that ultimately led to winning the prestigious National Guitar Fingerstyle Championship at Winfield twice,.. Ross' music is not the plodding and timid guitarwork that sometimes is associated with new age, despite the fact that Narada is widely known as a new age label. Ross can really kick up some phosphor-bronze dust with his syncopated six-string sense on tunes such as "Loaded. Leather. Moonroof.", "Zarzuela", "Wall of Glass", "Lucy Watusi" and "Three Hands"."

== Track listing ==
All songs by Don Ross.

1. "Big Buck"
2. "Thin Air"
3. "Loaded.Leather.Moonroof"
4. "This Dragon Won't Sleep"
5. "King Street Suite"
6. "Zarzuela"
7. "In From the Cold"
8. "Wall of Glass"
9. "Midnight March"
10. "Lucy Watusi"
11. "Catherine"
12. "Three Hands"

== Personnel ==
- Don Ross – guitar, baritone guitar
- Jordan O'Connor – bass
