= Don Ross (album) =

Studio album by Don Ross
- Released: 1990
- Label: Duke Street Records

Don Ross chronology
Bearing Straight (1989)	Don Ross (1990)	Three Hands (1992)

Don Ross is the title of a recording by Canadian guitarist Don Ross, released in 1990.

== Track listing ==
1. "Groovy Sunflowers"
2. "Zarzuela"
3. "Thin Air"
4. "Bluefinger"
5. "Carolan's Quarrel with the Landlady, Michael and Juliana"
6. "Lucy Watusi"
7. "Wall of Glass"
8. "Enka"
9. "August on the Island"
10. "Little Giants"

== Personnel ==
- Don Ross – guitar
