= Brooke Miller (musician) =

Canadian singer-songwriter and musician (born 1982)

- Born: Brooke Ellen Miller; January 14, 1982 (age 44); Montague, Prince Edward Island, Canada
- Origin: Montreal, Quebec, Canada
- Genres: Acoustic rock
- Occupations: Musician, composer
- Instruments: Guitar, vocals
- Years active: 1995–present
- Labels: Sony, Hickory, Candyrat, Sparkle Plenty, Universal

Brooke Miller is a Canadian singer-songwriter and musician.

== Early life ==
Miller was born in Montague, Prince Edward Island, Canada on January 14, 1982. She played saxophone as a child and took up the guitar when she was ten years old. Around age 11 she began writing her own songs and at age 12 formed a trio that eventually toured the Maritimes as an opening act for other bands.

== Career ==
Miller released her first independent CD, Lending an Hourglass, in 2003. A fellow musician, Don Ross, produced her follow-up CD and Miller later married him. (they later divorced, with Miller now being engaged to Prince Edward Island artist Rick MacDonald) She was signed to Sony/ATV Music Publishing in New York City and released the album You Can See Everything on Sony's Hickory Records in 2007. The album was produced by Ross and Peter Lubin, and mixed by Frank Filipetti.

In 2010 Miller released the self-produced album Shake It Off on Candyrat Records. In 2011, her self-titled album featuring new material, and new versions of previously released songs, was issued on the Universal Music Group label. In 2012, Miller released an audiophile SACD/LP recording, entitled "Familiar", on the German hi-fi label Stockfisch Records.

Miller reports that her music has been influenced by Leon Redbone, Ricki Lee Jones, Bonnie Raitt, Bruce Cockburn, Ani DiFranco, Joni Mitchell and The Police.

== Discography ==
=== Albums ===
- 2003: Lending an Hourglass, Independent
- 2007: You Can See Everything, Hickory/Sony/ATV
- 2010: Shake It Off, Candyrat
- 2011: Brooke Miller, Sparkle Plenty/Universal
- 2012: Familiar, Stockfisch
- 2016: Impossible Story, https://brookemiller.bandcamp.com
