= Nicholas Barron =

American musician

Nicholas Barron is an American folk music, blues guitarist and singer-songwriter based in evanston, Illinois, United States. Born in the U.S. Virgin Islands, Barron soon moved to Columbia, Missouri and then Marblehead, Massachusetts, where he spent most of his childhood. At 17, he moved to Oak Park, Illinois, to live with his father and attend his senior year of high school at OPRF.

His mother was a children's librarian, while his father was a painter. His earliest memories are of him listening to his mother's extensive blues, folk, R&B and jazz records collection. Barron soon started playing guitar and developed a knack for performing for friends and family and being the hit of his high school's yearly talent show impersonating Elvis Presley and Bob Dylan. It was in adulthood that he moved to Chicago area and began his music career as a troubadour on the streets, and in the subways of Chicago's 'L' stations. In the mid-1990s, he founded his band Swimmer, that held a weekly Thursday night residency at The Elbo Room. Both of Swimmers CDs were called “the Best of the year” by local Chicago radio station WXRT.

Since his stint as a street performer, Barron has sung for several different Comcast sports radio and TV commercials and has opened for musicians such as B.B. King, Al Green, Johnny Cash, Neville Brothers, John Martyn, Joan Armatrading, Jay Leno, Buckwheat Zydeco, and The B52's. In 2007, he was introduced by James Taylor as the launch artist for The New York Times Emerging Artist Series.

== Discography ==
- Nicholas Barron and Waymon Davis (1989)
- Welcome to my Whirld (1998)
- Frequency Gel (2000)
- Get Down with Nicholas Barron (2002)
- Solo Acoustic Covers 1 (2003)
- Bigger Picture (2004)
- Live at Uncommon Ground (2005)
- I'm Not Superman (2007)
- As I Am (2007)
- Live in Transient Sound (2008)
