= Chris Woods (guitarist) =

British guitarist

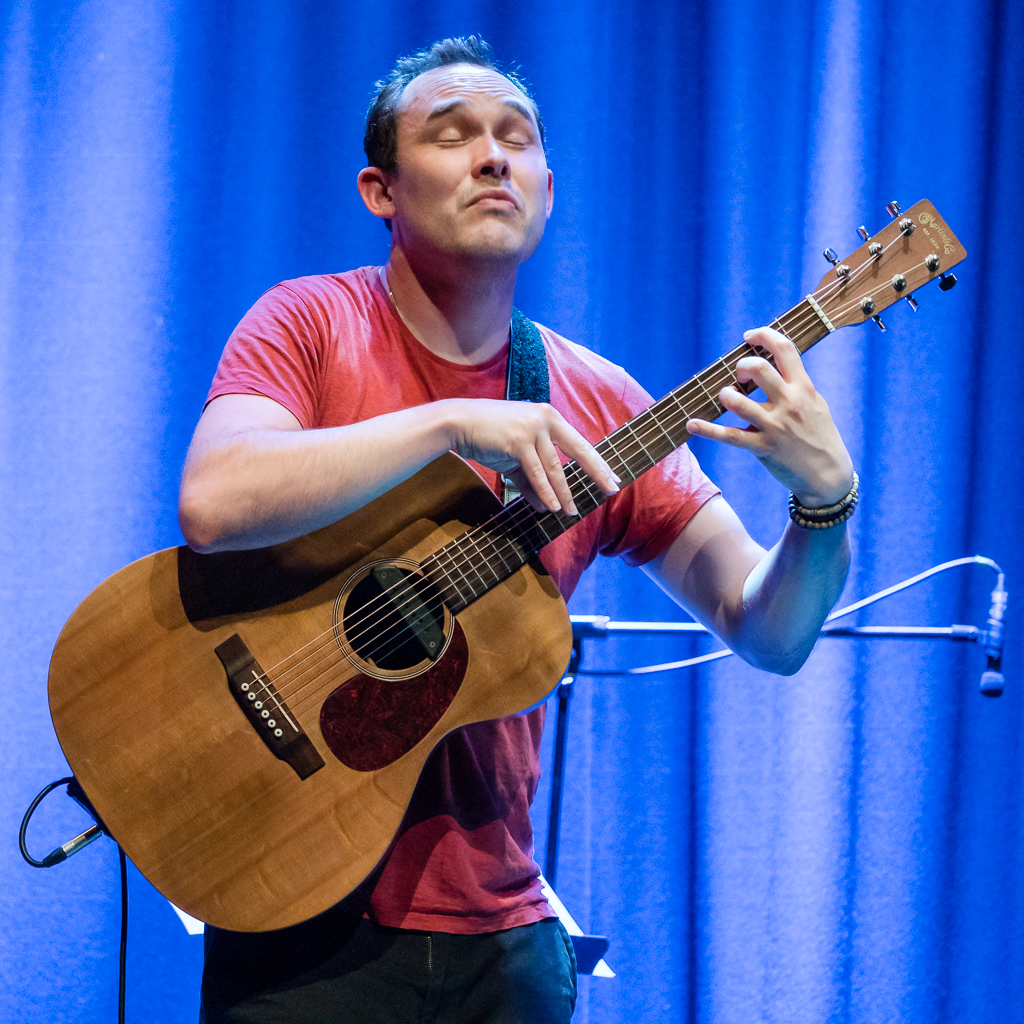

Background information
- Born: Sussex
- Genres: Jazz, world
- Occupations: Musician, composer
- Instrument: Guitar
- Years active: 2011–present
- Website: chriswoodsgroove.co.uk

Chris Woods, born in Sussex, is a British fingerstyle guitarist whose playing features extended techniques. Woods is also a composer, educator and author of Percussive Acoustic Guitar. Recording as ‘The Chris Woods Groove Orchestra’ and ‘Chris Woods Groove’.

== Playing style ==
Woods’ playing is characterised by the use of contemporary and extended guitar techniques, including; alternative tunings, tapping and guitar percussion. His technique was developed whilst experimenting at university with solo Jazz guitar playing as well as taking influence from artists such as John Martyn. Releasing music at the time of the ‘youtube percussive acoustic guitar boom’ he featured in the documentary ‘Acoustic Uprising’ which explored the percussive guitar boom phenomenon.

Woods uses a stomp box, to create an accompanying beat to his music. In 2012 the company Logarhtyhm created a signature stomp box for Woods, keeping his playing style in mind throughout the design process. His main guitar is a Martin 000x1.

He performs as a soloist as well as with various different instrumental ensemble line ups, past venues and events have included Glastonbury Festival, London Olympia, Real World Studios, the NAMM Show, Mikulassky Jazz Festival, Sage Gateshead and more.

== Compositions ==
Woods released two solo guitar collections; Woodcraft (2011), and Stories For Solo Guitar (2013) as well as a duo album with Will McNicol in 2015 48 hour Atlas, which was recorded and written in 48 hours.

Between 2015 and 2018, he released several singles and an EP as The Chris Woods Groove Orchestra, also containing and launching a project called Guitar Revolution.

Guitar Revolution is a composition made up of four parts, from beginner to advanced. Inviting members of the public to join at The London Acoustic Guitar Show in September 2016 to perform the piece. The music was published in Acoustic Magazine issue 120 and online for free.

After an oversubscribed pop-up performance at the London Acoustic Show. The Chris Woods Groove Orchestra toured the project with the support of Martin Guitars in early 2017, inviting the public to join at various different towns.

In late 2017, Chris Woods was commissioned to create a new score 'Orchestral Evolution' by Soundstorm Music Education Hub funded through support from Arts Council England.

== Educational publications ==
Woods is the author of Percussive Acoustic Guitar, which was first published by Hal Leonard in March 2013. He was approached by Leonard at the NAMM Show in California to write the 'how to play' percussive guide. The guide is used within educational establishments and as an academic reference for the style. The publication contains instruction on percussive guitar techniques. Categorising these percussive techniques as ‘String Slapping’, ‘Body Percussion’, ‘Tapping’, ‘Harmonics’ and ‘Alternate Tunings’. The categories are divided into chapters, with each chapter containing different examples. The examples all begin with their own ‘warm-up’. The book concludes with several full pieces and is accompanied by a DVD.

He also wrote a regular column for Acoustic Magazine, and contributed to Guitar Techniques magazine with the 'Creative Acoustic' Series including; Issue 253- Guitar Percussion Issue 254 – DADGAD, Issue 255 – Harmonics, Issue 256 – Partial Capo and Issue 289 - Percussive Acoustic. Both magazines are published by Future Publishing.
