= Bearing Straight =

Studio album by Don Ross
- Released: 1989
- Studio: Manta Sound
- Label: Duke Street Records
- Producer: Don Ross

Don Ross chronology
| Bearing Straight (1989) | Don Ross (1990) |

Bearing Straight is the title of the debut album of Canadian guitarist Don Ross, released in 1989.

== Track listing ==
- All songs written and arranged by Don Ross.
1. "The First Ride" 3:42
2. "Catherine" 5:57
3. "Midnight March" 5:30
4. "Silversmith" 6:20
5. "That'll Be the Phone" 3:42
6. "Patmos" 6:57
7. "The Is-Ought Controversy" 3:34
8. "Goby Fish" 3:10
9. "King Street Suite" 4:11
10. "Ginger and Fred" 3:27
11. "In From the Cold" 5:42
12. "New Aaron" 7:09
13. "Slow Burn" 5:51

== Personnel ==
- Don Ross – acoustic guitars
- David Piltch - acoustic bass on track 2
- Hugh Marsh - violin on track 2
