= Erik Mongrain =

Canadian composer and guitarist

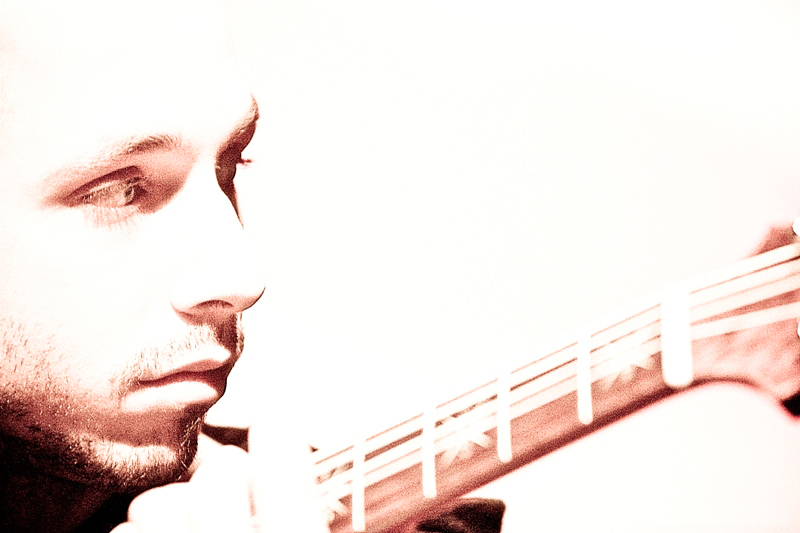

Background information
- Born: April 12, 1980 (age 46); Montreal, Quebec, Canada
- Genres: Acoustic rock
- Occupations: Guitarist, composer
- Instrument: Acoustic guitar
- Years active: 2001–present
- Labels: Prophase Music and Music Video Distributors
- Website: erikmongrain.com

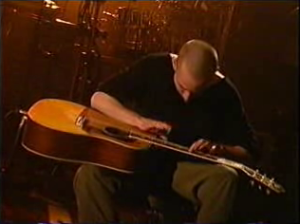
Lap-Tapping technique by Erik Mongrain

Equilibrium

Muse

Pandora's Box

AirTap!

Fates

Fusions

Mais Quand?

PercussienFa

Erik Mongrain (born April 12, 1980) is a Canadian composer and guitarist.

== Biography ==
Mongrain was inspired early on by the work of Metallica, Jimi Hendrix, and Kurt Cobain. When he was 18, he heard the work of guitarist Don Ross and he thought: "This was a new revelation to me. I finally found my niche." After that, he was heavily influenced by the work of Michael Hedges, and also began to experiment with a technique known as lap tapping.

Mongrain plays live shows in the United States, Japan, Germany, Canada, and England. He started out busking in the streets, before he was discovered in Spain; His music is featured in a documentary produced by Lance Trumbull for the Everest Peace Project. He was featured on the cover of Guild Guitar Company Magazine. Erik was featured in Le Journal de Montréal and many other acoustic guitar magazines. His first full-length album, Fates, was released in December 2006 on his website as a series of individually buyable/downloadable songs. The physical CD was released in June 2007 (May for Japan).

In 2007, Mongrain went on a tour around the world, particularly in Europe, Asia and America. He performed also at the famous Montreal International Jazz Festival and at the "Studio-théâtre" of the Place des Arts of Montreal where the live performance was recorded. Mongrain was invited for the premiere of the « World Music Heritage », a drive by Gontiti on the national Japanese network (NHK).

The iVideosongs company have filmed four clips including Equilibrium. The clips are tutorials of Mongrain's lap tapping style, downloadable on the company's Web site.

His "AirTap!" video has been viewed over 7 million times on YouTube.

On October 21, 2008, Mongrain launched his second album "Equilibrium" which contained nine new compositions.. The album was recorded in July 2008 in "The Dragon Crossing studios" owned by Paul Reed Smith (PRS Guitars) and located in Annapolis, Maryland. Musicians such as Michael Manring on fretless bass and Bill Plummer on synthesizers contributed to the album.

The album was launched live on Mongrain's official website (streamed broadcast) on 21 October 2008.

In August 2012, he released a 10-track album called Forward.

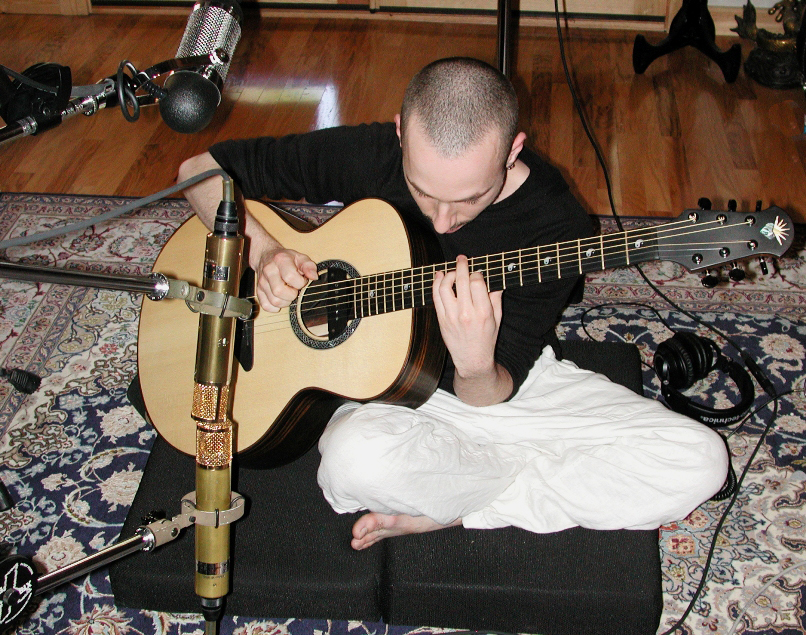
Recording of the Equilibrium album at Paul Reed Smith's personal studio

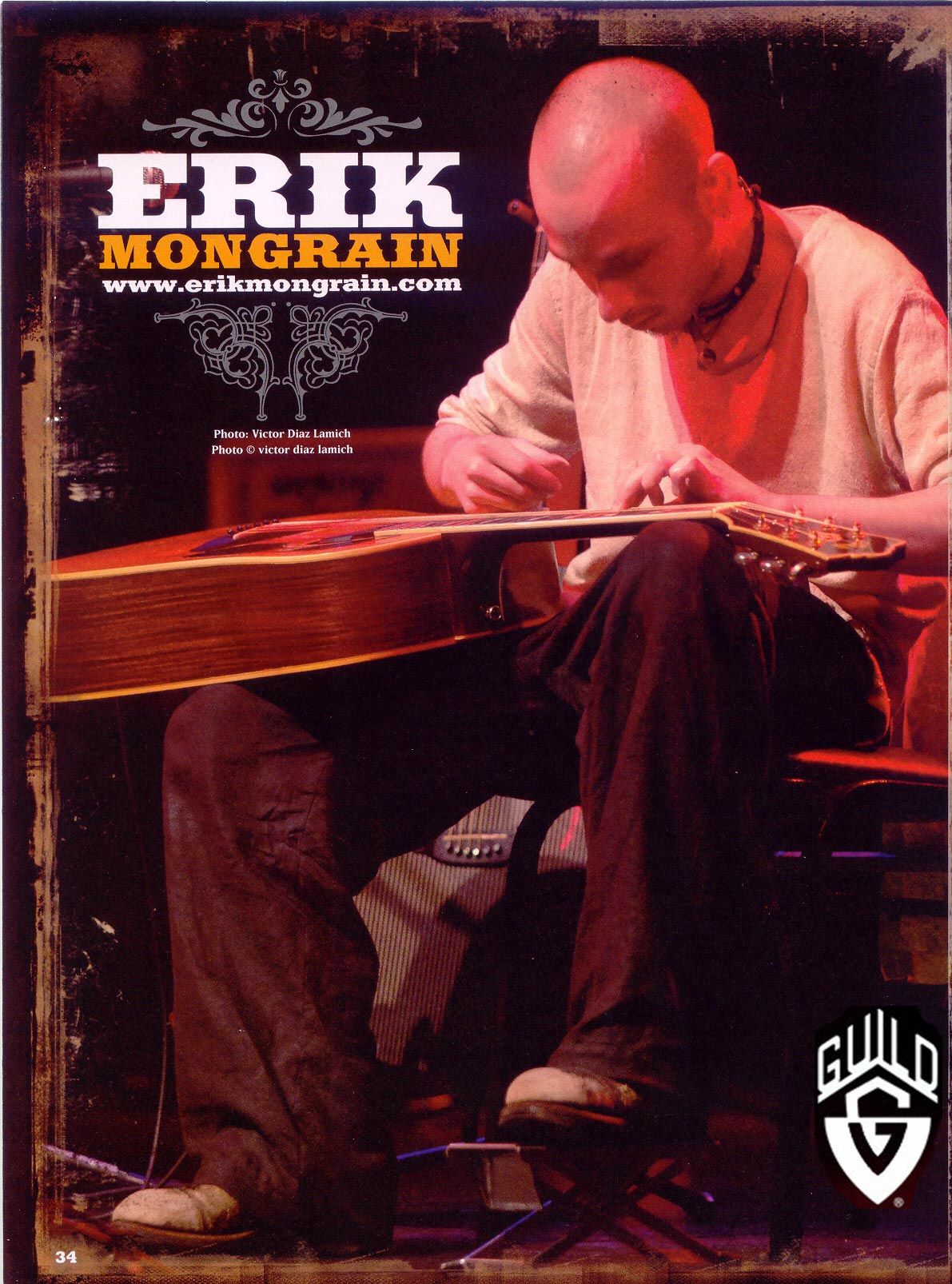
Erik Mongrain featured on 2007 Guild catalog

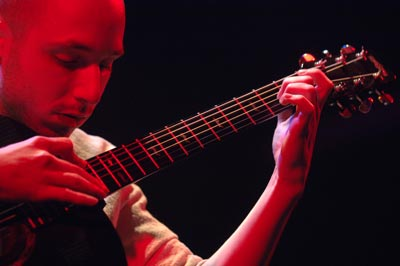
Concert in Montreal (2006)

== Discography ==
- Fates (2007)
- Equilibrium (2008)
- Forward (2012)
- Tempo (2022)

== See also ==
- Tapping
- Michael Hedges
- Preston Reed
- Don Ross
