= Passion Session =

Studio album by Don Ross
- Released: March 1999
- Label: Narada/Virgin
- Producer: Artie Traum

Don Ross chronology
Loaded, Leather, Moonroof (1997)	Passion Session (1999)	Huron Street (2001)

Passion Session is the seventh album by Canadian guitarist Don Ross and his first on the Narada/Virgin label. It was recorded in Berlin, Germany in the confines of the Passionskirche (The Church of the Passion) in Berlin's Kreuzberg neighborhood.

== Track listing ==
All songs by Don Ross except as noted.

1. "Klimbim" – 4:54
2. "Michael, Michael, Michael" – 4:12
3. "Berkeley Springs" (David Essig) – 3:30
4. "Tight Trite Night" – 4:00
5. "First Ride" – 4:06
6. "With You in Mind" – 4:51
7. "Annie and Martin" – 4:55
8. "So Little Time" – 4:14
9. "Give Me Seven Reasons" – 4:09
10. "Blue Bear" – 2:23
11. "No Goodbyes" – 3:57

== Personnel ==
- Don Ross – guitar

== Production notes ==
- Engineered by Knut Becker
