= Masaaki Kishibe =

Japanese-born guitarist

Masaaki Kishibe 岸部真明
- Born: January 13, 1964 (age 61); Osaka, Japan
- Genres: Fingerstyle, instrumental
- Occupation: Guitarist
- Instruments: Guitar, piano
- Years active: 1995–present
- Labels: M.K Music
- Website: jpp.co.jp/capo

Masaaki Kishibe (岸部真明, born January 13, 1964) is an acoustic guitarist from Japan.

== Biography ==
Masaaki Kishibe was born in Suita, Osaka, and began studying piano at a young age, eventually picking up the guitar by the time he was 14. Kishibe learned both instruments at a fast pace and ultimately decided he wanted to take learning music more seriously. Throughout the next decade, he formally studied in music schooling, under famed Japanese guitarist, and composer, Isato Nakagawa. Kishibe would go on to learning a variety of different techniques, as well as music theory, and eventually began composing his own music using the fingerstyle technique.

In 1990, Masaaki Kishibe became a student at Berklee College of Music in Boston, Massachusetts, and moved to the United States to pursue his studies; however, having no ultimate objective in where to direct his study attention, he failed to graduate, and returned to Japan, though still humbled by his experiences in the U.S. He continued to teach himself fingerstyle guitar playing, and began to write his own compositions.

In 1995, Kishibe wrote and recorded his first record, "Truth," to which he attempted to display his own personality through guitar composition and playing. While the works included many pieces that are memorable, and are cherished fan favorites, it was considered an album that had maturing to fulfill in his writing style.

Over the next four years, Kishibe would continue to improve his playing ability, as well as his writing ability, and the results came to 1999's "Growing Up".

Kishibe has continued to tour around the world, and continue to write and release music, composing five albums, and eventually began creating fingerstyle arrangements of popular pieces of music, including "Salut d'Amore" from the film, Nuovo Cinema Paradiso, and "When You Wish Upon A Star" from the Disney children's film, Pinocchio. He has also released separate live performance and instruction DVDs.

== American audience ==
While Kishibe is widely known around Japan and other Eastern countries, he was not particularly well known in the U.S. until he performed at the 32nd Walnut Valley Festival in Winfield, Kansas, in 2003 taking 2nd place overall in Fingerstyle Guitar; then subsequently touring with guitarist another former Walnut Valley winner, Andy McKee, throughout Taiwan. As McKee continued to rise to fame in the U.S., and helped bring attention to fingerstyle playing with the uploading of his videos of Rylynn and Drifting to YouTube, garnering millions of plays and overnight fandom, fans who became inspired by his form of playing would dig up more information on guitarists like McKee, particularly Andy's list of guitarists he recommended his fans to look into, which included his website for a great amount of time. As attention to McKee's recommendations grew, so did the growing popularity of music that listeners could find from Kishibe. Since his music is not available for purchase anywhere other than Japan, and only through ordering via e-mail with his Japanese distributor, Pooh Yokocho Inc, the easiest way for curious fans to hear Kishibe's music for the first time is through the few low bit rates MP3 files contained for free on his website. A particular song, "Hana," has been covered and performed by many professional and amateur guitarists around the world on YouTube. McKee himself recorded a cover of it on his 2009 EP, Common Ground. While Kishibe still has no American distribution, his fanbase continues to grow through the underground Internet music community.

== Discography ==
Album title	Year
Truth	1995
Growing Up	1999
Bloom	2002
Recollection	2005
Kiseki no Yama	2006
My Favorites	2008
12 Stories	2009
Ways	2013
Passion	2016
