= Don Ross (guitarist) =

Canadian fingerstyle guitarist (born 1960)

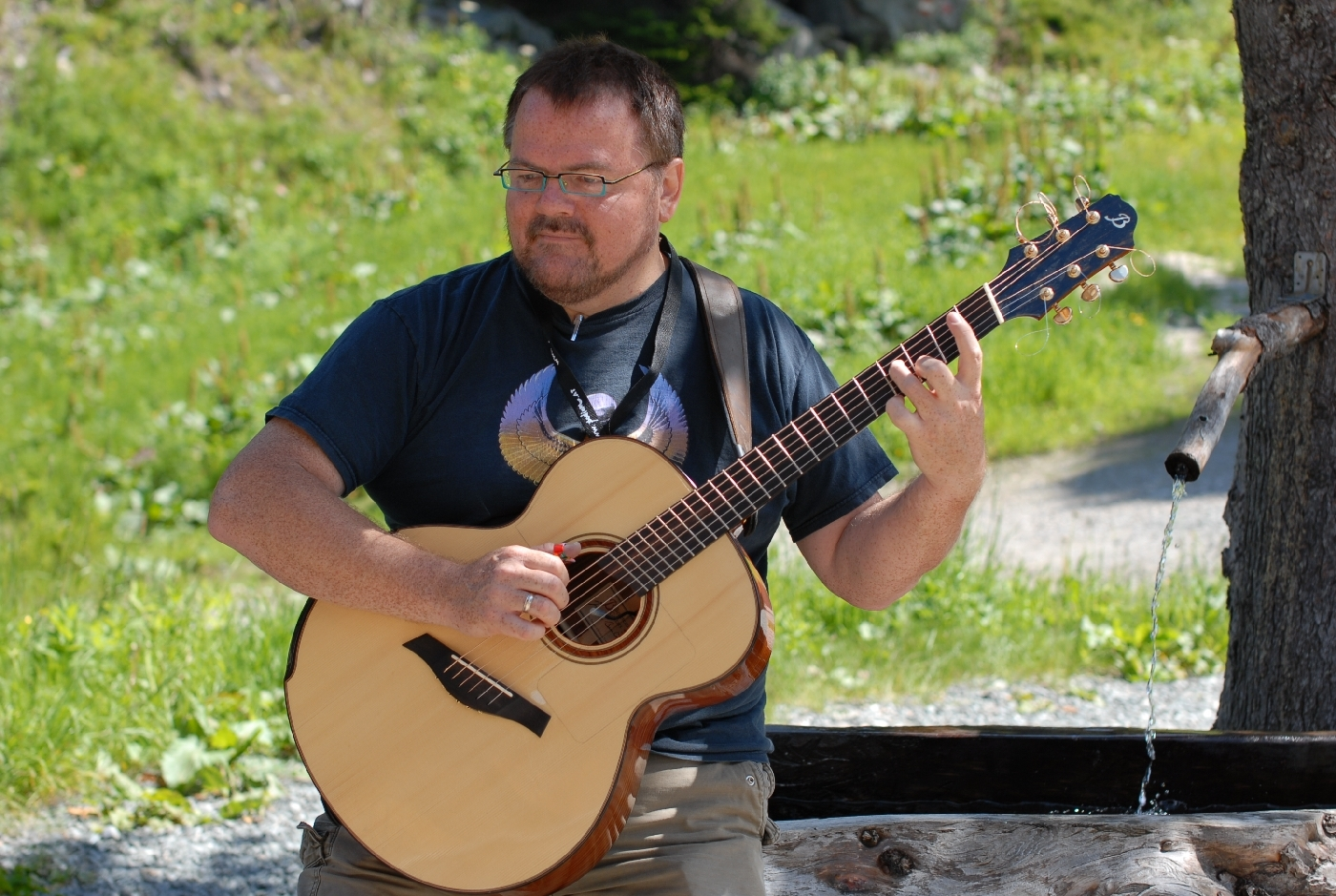
- Don Ross in 2009

Background information
- Born: Donald James Ross; November 19, 1960 (age 65); Montreal, Quebec
- Origin: Windsor, Nova Scotia
- Genres: New-age, pop rock, folk rock
- Occupation: Musician
- Instruments: Guitar, vocals
- Years active: 1986–present
- Labels: Duke Street, Sony, Narada, CandyRat, Goby Fish
- Formerly of: Men of Steel
- Website: donrossonline.com

Donald James Ross (born November 19, 1960) is a Canadian fingerstyle guitarist. He was the first person to win the National Fingerstyle Guitar Championship twice (1988 and 1996). His album Huron Street reached the top ten on the Billboard new-age music chart.

== Biography ==
Ross was born in Montreal, Quebec, to a Scottish immigrant father and a Mi'kmaq mother. He is a member of the Millbrook First Nation. He studied composition at the music department of York University in Toronto with David Mott, James Tenney and Phil Werren. After receiving his Bachelor of Fine Arts in Music in 1983, he studied philosophy at St. Hyacinth College and Seminary in Granby, Massachusetts, while living at San Damiano Friary in Holyoke. He started his novitiate for the Canadian custody of the Conventual Franciscans of Immaculate Conception Province at St. Francis Friary in Staten Island, New York. He decided to leave that pursuit and become a musician.

In 1986 Ross produced and published his first album, Kehewin, on cassette, and became a full-time musician. He performed as a duo with his late wife, singer Kelly McGowan, in 1986 and 1987, and then in a trio called Harbord Trio with her and violinist the late Oliver Schroer. At the same time he was a member of the new-age and jazz quartet called Eye Music. He composed for several theatre productions in Toronto dealing with First Nations life in Canada, such as The Ecstasy of Rita Joe (York University, 1989), Dreaming Beauty (Inner Stage Theatre, 1990) and Big Buck City (Cahoots Theatre, 1991). He also composed for the CBC radio serial Dead Dog Café. In 1987, some of his compositions were played by the Toronto Symphony Orchestra, the Vancouver Symphony Orchestra and the Thunder Bay Symphony Orchestra.

His first place win, after two previous attempts, in the 1988 American Walnut Valley Festival earned him a contract with Duke Street Records, Toronto, where he published his next two albums, 1989's Bearing Straight and 1990's Don Ross. The liner notes from "Bearing Straight" contain a written tribute from the late musician Michael Hedges, including the oft-quoted, "I play the guitar because it lets me dream aloud." Since then he has released several mostly instrumental CDs for Duke Street, Columbia Records and Narada Records, though some of them feature him as a singer. He published three instructional videos, several single transcriptions and a book with nine of his pieces, and worked with the magazine Canadian Musician. At the Ontario Council of Folk Festivals he won a prize with McGowan, and in 1996 he won first prize for the second time at the Walnut Valley Festival. Starting in 1997 he guided the Don Ross Cannington Guitar Weekend, a guitar workshop. More recently he has also led the workshop in Prince Edward Island, Port Hope, Ontario and in Nova Scotia.

In 2001, McGowan died, and Ross was a single father for four years. In 2005 he married Brooke Miller, a singer-songwriter from Prince Edward Island. They divorced in 2026.

Ross was the first artist to sign with indie record label Candyrat Records, in 2005. His second wife also joined the roster.

Ross has done three tours with the Men of Steel guitar group, the last of which was mounted in 2006. The band is a mix of international members including bluegrass maestro Dan Crary, acoustic guitarist Beppe Gambetta, and Celtic folk guitarist Tony McManus.

Ross performs most of his concerts solo, but has also regularly performed with Miller, Andy McKee, bassist Jordan O'Connor and guitarist/songwriter Julie Malía (a.k.a. Jule Malischke). He also has a quartet that performs his more jazz and funk based material, called Don Ross Louder Than Usual, featuring Andrew Craig on keyboards, Marito Marques on drums and O'Connor on bass.

In 2010–2011 Ross was a Dalhousie University professor teaching history of guitar and techniques, while still travelling extensively for music. He did not renew his contract for the following year due to high demand for concert appearances.

In 2012, Ross moved back to his hometown of Montreal, Quebec. He and Miller also lived for several years in Toronto, Ontario; Halifax, Nova Scotia; and Charlottetown, Prince Edward Island. He currently lives in Windsor, Nova Scotia.

During the COVID-19 pandemic, Ross studied for a Master of Arts degree online in Orchestration through the University of Chichester and ThinkSpace Education, graduating in 2021. He has spent much of the time since composing original orchestrations for video games, film, and television. Also in 2021, Ross won the Walter Carsen Prize for Excellence in the Performing Arts, administered by the Canada Council for the Arts. In 2023, Ross released his first solo album in six years, a mixture of solo and collaborative music entitled WATER. The album features collaborations with Bruce Cockburn, Brooke Miller, Michael Manring, The Atlantic String Machine, Sean Hall and the City of Prague Philharmonic Orchestra. His latest album, Songs That Found Me, a collection of vocal music, was released in April 2026.

Ross's daughter is writer Tara McGowan-Ross.

=== Style and technique ===
Ross's music borrows from blues, jazz, folk and classical music creating a style that he describes as "heavy wood". Ross names Bruce Cockburn, John Renbourn, Pierre Bensusan, Keith Jarrett, Egberto Gismonti and Pat Metheny as his main sources of inspiration. One of his songs, "Michael, Michael, Michael", is dedicated to Michael Hedges, and Ross has performed straight covers of his compositions. One obvious but unattributed influence is the psychedelic 1967 track 'Embryonic Journey' by Jefferson Airplane. Ross's advanced technique and his sure feeling for rhythm combine with uncommon ideas to make his style instantly recognizable. He often uses percussive techniques and plays intricate down and upstroke patterns with his thumb. These techniques have found their way into the toolboxes of many competitive fingerstyle guitarists. His use of acrylic nails allows him to get a consistent, clean tone without the hassle of broken fingernails.

Ross played a Lowden S-10 in the beginning of his career, and in 1997 started playing a Lowden O-10. Today he plays custom-made guitars by Marc Beneteau, a Canadian luthier from St. Thomas, Ontario. The Beneteaus are equipped with a combination of microphone and K&K pickups. Occasionally he plays a baritone guitar and a harp guitar by Marc Beneteau, or uses a custom 7-string by Oskar Graf, a luthier from Clarendon, Ontario.

In the liner notes to Ross' 2003 album Robot Monster, Bruce Cockburn writes, "Nobody does what Don Ross does with an acoustic guitar. He takes the corners so fast you think he's going to roll, but he never loses control."

== Discography ==
=== Solo or duo ===
- 1989: Bearing Straight, (Duke Street)
- 1990: Don Ross, (Duke Street)
- 1992: Three Hands, (Duke Street)
- 1995: This Dragon Won't Sleep, (Sony Canada)
- 1996: Wintertide, (Sony Canada)
- 1997: Loaded, Leather, Moonroof, (Sony Canada)
- 1999: Passion Session, (Narada)
- 2001: Huron Street, (Narada)
- 2003: Robot Monster, (Narada)
- 2005: Music for Vacuuming, (CandyRat)
- 2006: Men of Steel - Four Way Mirror, (Goby Fish)
- 2006: Live in Your Head, (Goby Fish)
- 2007: Wave From Your Window, (Goby Fish)
- 2008: The Thing That Came from Somewhere, with Andy McKee (CandyRat)
- 2009: Any Colour, (Goby Fish)
- 2010: Breakfast for Dogs, (CandyRat)
- 2012: Upright and Locked Position, (CandyRat)
- 2013: 12:34, with Calum Graham (CandyRat)
- 2014: PS15, (CandyRat)
- 2014: Flake, (CandyRat)
- 2017: A Million Brazilian Civilians, (CandyRat)
- 2023: Water (GFM)

=== Groups ===
- 1990: Circle of Stone, by Harbord Trio (Don Ross/Kelly McGowan/Oliver Schroer) (Familiar Music)
- 2003: Live: The Art of the Steel-String Guitar, by Men of Steel (Don Ross/Beppe Gambetta/Dan Crary/Tony McManus), (Thunderation)
- 2006: Four Way Mirror, by Men of Steel (Don Ross/Beppe Gambetta/Dan Crary/Tony McManus), (Goby Fish)
- 2019: Don Ross Louder Than Usual, with Andrew Craig on keyboards, Jordan O’Connor on bass, Marito Marques on drums, and Ross on guitar and vocals (GFM)

=== DVDs ===
- 2004: Don Ross: Live, (CandyRat)
- 2006: Don Ross/Andy McKee/Michael Manring: Live in Toronto, (CandyRat)

== See also ==
- Jon Gomm
- Erik Mongrain
- Andy Mckee
- First Nations music
- Music of Canada
