= Pierre Bensusan =

French-Algerian acoustic guitarist

- Born: Oran, Algeria
- Genres: New Age, jazz, folk, bluegrass
- Occupation: Musician
- Instrument: Guitar
- Years active: 1960s–present
- Labels: Rounder, Favored Nations
- Website: pierrebensusan.com

Pierre Bensusan (born 30 October 1957) is a French-Algerian acoustic guitarist. As Sephardic Jews, his family came from Spain, Spanish Morocco, and French Algeria. His music has been characterized as Celtic, folk, world music, New-age, and chamber jazz. He has published three books of music and tablature. He plays in DADGAD tuning.

== Biography ==
Bensusan was born in 1957 in Oran, French Algeria. Born in the middle of the Algerian War of Independence, he moved to Paris with his family as a child. He studied piano and classical music at the age of seven. Four years later, he began to teach himself guitar after his father had bought him a steel string acoustic guitar and a classmate taught him "a few chords". At seventeen, he signed a contract for his debut album, Près de Paris, which won the Grand Prix du Disque at the Montreux Festival.

His influences include Big Bill Broonzy, Larry Carlton, Martin Carthy, Ry Cooder, Joan Baez, Reverend Gary Davis, Davey Graham, Jimi Hendrix, Mississippi John Hurt, Bert Jansch, Nic Jones, Paco de Lucía, John McLaughlin, Pat Metheny, Wes Montgomery, John Renbourn, Django Reinhardt, Ralph Towner, and Doc Watson.

Bensusan uses DADGAD tuning system and electronics, such as delays, distortion, and volume pedals. He has stated that he became interested in playing in DADGAD because of its "mystical" and "romantic" quality which made him feel like he had gone back to the 16th or 17th century.

He includes scat-singing in his compositions, both composed and improvised. He has collaborated extensively with saxophonist Didier Malherbe. He performed the song "ELM" for the Cowboy Bebop soundtrack Cowboy Bebop No Disc for Yoko Kanno.

In 2006, Bensusan contributed his song "Falafel a Montsegur" to the album Artists for Charity – Guitarists 4 the Kids, produced by Slang Productions, to assist World Vision Canada in helping underprivileged children.

Intuite (Favored Nations, 2001) was his first instrumental, solo acoustic guitar album. It included a song he dedicated to Michael Hedges.

== Discography ==
- Pres de Paris (Cezame, 1975)
- 2 (Cezame, 1977)
- Musiques (Cezame, 1979)
- Solilai (Stockfisch; Claddagh 1981)
- Spices (CBS, 1988)
- Wu Wei (Rounder, 1994)
- Live Au New Morning (XIII Bis, 1997)
- Intuite (Favored Nations, 2000)
- Bamboule (Acoustic Music Records, 2001)
- International Guitar Night with Andrew York, Guinga, Brian Gore (Favored Nations, 2004)
- Altiplanos (Favored Nations, 2005)
- Vividly (Favored Nations, 2010)
- Azwan (MVD Audio, 2020)

== Books ==
- Bensusan, P: The Guitar Book, HAL Leonard Publishing Corporation, 1985 ISBN 0-88188-620-3
- Bensusan, P: DADGAD Music: Compositions from Spices and Wu Wei, John August Music / Mel Bay Publications, 1996 ISBN 0-7866-1452-8
- Bensusan, P: The Intuite Guitar Book, DADGAD Music (France), 2003
