= The Art of the Bawdy Song =

Studio album by the Baltimore Consort and the Merry Companions
- Released: November 1992
- Recorded: October 1990
- Studio: Troy Savings Bank Music Hall (New York)
- Genres: Renaissance music; Baroque music; early music; classical music; pub songs
- Length: 67:39
- Label: Dorian
- Producer: Douglas Brown

The Baltimore Consort and the Merry Companions chronology
Watkins Ale (1990)	The Art of the Bawdy Song (1992)	La Rocque'n'Roll (1993)

The Art of the Bawdy Song is the third studio album by the American early music ensemble the Baltimore Consort, in collaboration with the vocal group the Merry Companions. Released in November 1992 by Dorian Recordings, it features 33 bawdy songs, catches, rounds, ballads and madrigals from 16th, 17th and 18th century England, spanning the English Renaissance and Baroque periods.

The compositions, many of which are by Henry Purcell or his contemporaries, use off-color humour and are sexually explicit, sometimes incorporating double entendres and innuendos but on other occasions using strong language, and cover themes such as sex acts, cuckoldry and bodily functions. Some of the lyrics are scatological in tone, including Purcell's "Pox on You", which incorporates belching sound effects. Many of the rounds and catches were pub songs sung socially by men in Restoration England's many taverns.

In the United States, The Art of the Bawdy Song featured a Parental Advisory warning sticker, and was cited as the first classical music album to feature one. Dorian's marketing capitalized on the album's crossover and novelty appeal. It became the label's biggest-selling release, appearing on the Billboard Classical Crossover charts for six months and proving popular on classical radio. Music critics contrasted the vulgar or titillating content of the album with modern recording artists, with some highlighting The Art of the Bawdy Song as a departure from other recordings of the early music movement. In 1993, the Baltimore Consort performed pieces from the album live at several events, omitting some of the more explicit material.

== Background and recording ==
Based in Baltimore, Maryland, the six-member Baltimore Consort, led by Mary Anne Ballard, formed to play 16th and 17th century music from Great Britain, France and Italy. The ensemble were among the first signings to classical music label Dorian Recordings, who in 1990 issued the first two Baltimore Consort albums, On the Banks of Helicon and Watkins Ale, which contained Scottish early music and English renaissance music, respectively. As biographer Robert Cummings wrote, "[the] Consort quickly became one of the most popular American early music ensembles, as a string of successful recordings and concert tours followed." Dorian considered its signees, particularly the Baltimore Consort, unique for providing "performances that can't be found in every record-shop bin".

According to reviewer Blair Sanderson, The Art of the Bawdy Song continued the Baltimore Consort's reputation for open-minded performances of early music. Recorded in October 1990 at Troy Savings Bank Music Hall, New York, the album was produced and edited by Douglas Brown, with two post-session producers including Ballard. It was recorded with the all-male vocal group the Merry Companions, who act as support on the album. The Baltimore Consort's concept for the record was to pull from the heyday of the bawdy song in the 17th century; as music critic Eric Salzman describes, these off-color songs, in the forms of catches and rounds, were popular in England from John Hilton the younger's "Catch That Catch Can" (1652) through to the 18th century, but their popularity had waned by the Victorian era. According to recorder and bass viol player with the ensemble and resident composer at Moravian College, Larry Lipkis, the tradition of ribald catches remained popular as they were easy to compose. Some raunchier pieces from the era were left unrecorded for the project as the Baltimore Consort believed them to be too profane or of no value.

== Composition ==
=== Selection and themes ===
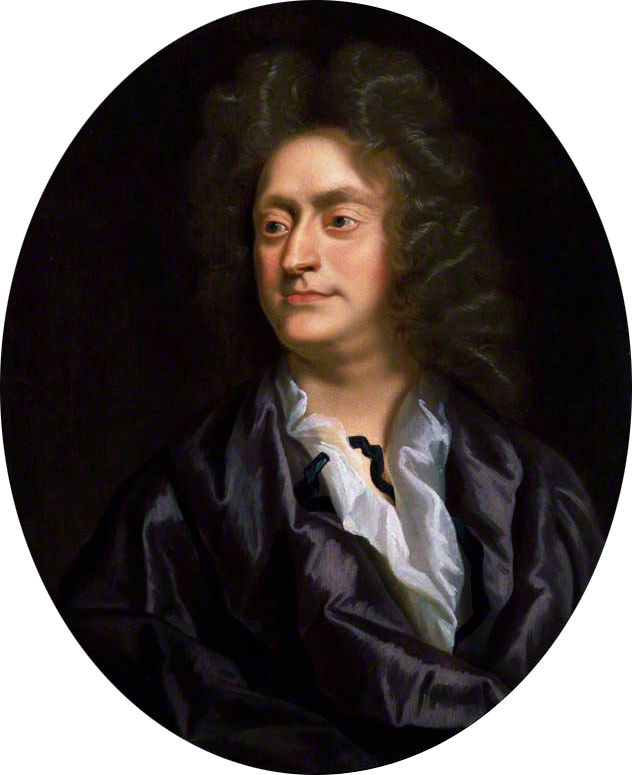
Many of the selections come from composer Henry Purcell (painted c. 1695)

An alternately song- and dance-oriented collection of English Renaissance music, The Art of the Bawdy Song features 33 bawdy ballads, rounds, catches and madrigals from 16th, 17th and 18th century England. Many of the songs, particularly the complex catches, are sung by the Merry Companions, whereas Custer LaRue is a vocalist on rural ballads. These ribald songs are frequently accompanied by a colourful variety of string (both plucked and bowed), wind and percussive instruments, with the Consort's musical input described as playful and "folk-tinged". As journalist David Patrick Stevens describes, the performers interpret the material with "all the sound effects you'd expect from songs meant to be performed by singers in various states of inebriation", alongside "simple accompaniments on fiddles, lutes and pennywhistles." For the purpose of variety, the album also contains some instrumental pieces.

Many of the songs, ballads and catches used are by 17th century composer Henry Purcell, but others are by his peers and anonymous composers of the era. Lipkis argues the album is not representative of Purcell's overall oeuvre, which is characterized by sacred compositions and opera, instead profiling "just another side of his musical persona." As Ballard comments, the songs "were tunes that men would sing in taverns and at meetings of all-male organizations." George Garbarino of Newsday describes the material as pub songs which "date back to a time in Restoration England when the women were 'wenches' and the men were flatulent." The journalist Dan DeLong believes the album transports listeners "back to the dark, stale-smelling taverns where the lower and middle classes gathered for a randy good time", adding that Purcell and his friends would meet in these locations to perform each other's compositions and improvise.

The lyrics, which are sometimes explicit but more often subtly provocative, include double-entendres and innuendo, and cover subjects such as explicit sex acts, bodily functions, Dionysus worship, cuckoldry, illicit sex and unrequited desire. According to Stevens, the most tasteful material depicts sexual intercourse, but as the album progresses, very strong language replaces the use of euphemisms. The album contains ditties Ballard says "I wouldn't play for my own mother." Lipkis contends that, whereas other celebrations of the Renaissance era avoid showcasing "the full side" of contemporary life, The Art of the Bawdy Song has a persistent tongue-in-cheek element, citing the fartophone (a bass recorder with no head) and the lyrical content of "My Thing Is My Own", "I Gave Her Cakes and I Gave Her Ale" and "Cold and Raw", songs described by DeLong as "the soft porn of Elizabethan England." DeLong believes the record satirizes the pretentious language on other early music recordings, while Lipkis contends that much of the music would sound liturgical without lyrics.

=== Songs ===
One of the tamer songs, "The Old Fumbler" concerns premature ejaculation, whereas "My Man John Had a Thing That Was Long", described by Garbarino as "a paean to male physiognomy", graphically depicts sexual intercourse between a man and a woman. Purcell's belch-and-flatulence-based "Pox on You" is authentically performed by the Merry Companions. The score for "Pox on You" includes several belches. "We satisfied that", Lipkis said, "We put several in for him where he asked – plus a few extra." "Celia Learning on the Spinnet" and "My Lady's Coachman John" are among the more explicit songs, whereas "Tom the Taylor", another relatively clean song, was analyzed by Morning Edition commentator Miles Hoffman, who said that the title character is initially "making a cloak for a lady, and he takes his tape measure out, which is 9 inches long. And that '9 inches' is not long enough to go around her waist. And there's another line in there about 'reaching her haunches,' and the way the lyrics work is when the different voices come in, the words get juxtaposed in such a way that the meanings — ahem — change."

== Release and promotion ==
Credited to the Baltimore Consort and the Merry Companions, The Art of the Bawdy Song was released on CD by Dorian in the United States in November 1992. (Note: Garbarino calls it an early November release, whereas Billboard cite December as the release month.) (Note: Catalogue number 90155.) The release was packaged with informative sleeve notes that speculate on, as reviewer Jonathan Freeman-Attwood describes, "the response of a post-Victorian society easily embarrassed by the mention of underwear." The most explicit four-letter words on the album are censored in the lyric section of the booklet. The cover painting is Gerard van Honthorst's The Merry Fiddler (1623).

For the release of The Art of the Bawdy Song, Dorian worked with classical distributor Allegro, who Dorian co-founder Brian M. Levine felt did impressive work promoting the record. Levine said that, due to the uniqueness of it being a classical album with a Parental Advisory sticker, Dorian marketed it to "the core classical and early-music markets as well, to take advantage of its crossover and novelty appeal. Allegro gave us great placement and positioning and really squeezed every drop of marketing value out of it." As a result of the marketing, The Art of the Bawdy Song became Dorian's best-selling release ever, and spent six months on the Billboard Classical Crossover charts. Selections from the record saw repeated play on classical musical stations across the United States in the months following its release. Billboard listed it as the 11th biggest classical crossover album of 1993.

=== Parental Advisory sticker ===
The Parental Advisory sticker was used on The Art of the Bawdy Song

The Art of the Bawdy Song carries a Parental Advisory warning sticker in the U.S., and has been credited as the first classical album to use one. (Note: John Moran's modern work The Manson Family: An Opera, a "crossover" work categorized as both classical and alternative rock and released earlier in 1992, also received the Parental Advisory sticker, at the time the only such example on an opera recording. In March 1992, San Francisco Examiner commented on the sticker appearing on Moran's opera recording, deeming it a rare sight on a classical album.) The use of the sticker attracted headlines; in an article titled "Classical CD Consorts with 'Parental Advisory' sticker", The Morning Call wrote that, for "the first time in the history of recorded classical music," Purcell and his 17th century peers "have joined the ranks" of controversial artists like Madonna, Ice-T and 2 Live Crew. Although use of the sticker is not enforced by the Recording Industry Association of America, Dorian still added it as a courtesy to consumers, under the Consort's suggestion, though it prevented the CD from being sold at Walmart. The press release warned that the recording is not for "the faint of heart, prudish or under the age of 18. Those easily offended will offend."

Ballard recalled that, as the album was released at the height of obscenity controversies around Ice-T and Robert Mapplethorpe's exhibit The Perfect Moment, the ensemble felt it necessary to utilise a warning not to buy the record for children or ageing relatives. "More importantly," she said, "we didn't want a radio disc jockey to play it on the air without auditioning it. They could get their license threatened! So we had to have a nice way of warning them and since the parental advisory sticker already existed, we thought that would be really fun. Because when you sit down and compare this to some of these rock lyrics, these old songs are really tame." Lipkis believed the sticker was necessary, regardless of the lighter language of some songs, whereas Dorian publicity director Linda Feldman found it useful to remind listeners that modern lyrics deemed offensive by some parties "have a historical precedent set by people like Henry Purcell", and hoped the sticker would entice buyers who otherwise have no interest in early music releases.

Garbarino believes that the compilation would be unlikely to cause uproar, deeming it closer in spirit to Monty Python or the film Tom Jones, while Feldman described the album as offbeat and "more Monty Python than hard-core." One reviewer felt only the use of certain words required a cover warning. In 2003, Deryk Barker of the Times Colonist contended that the Baltimore Consort were still likely the only classical group to have a release that contains the sticker.

== Critical reception ==
=== Contemporary reviews ===
Reviewers for Billboard opined that the "sexy and scatological" ballads and catches used on The Art of the Bawdy Song remained entertaining, particularly in these "period-sensitive performances", and contended that the parental advisory sticker would only help sales of the record. Holly McArthur of Future Sex cited "My Man John" as the most sexually titillating song and wrote that the album's brilliance "lies in its irony; beautiful Renaissance music, coupled with tongue-in-cheek lyrics about fucking and farting", recommending it to fans of classical music, scatological comedy and "carnal delights" and concluding that "it's so tastefully tasteless that even Tipper Gore could handle it." In his review for Stereo Review, Eric Salzman describes it as a "collection of old favorites" from the height of the bawdy song and writes that, although its off-color content would not compete with Madonna, "there is a coffeehouse wit and Jacobean charm to this antique porn—qualities that, one or two outbursts of collegiate enthusiasm aside, these players and singers mostly catch. Or catch that catch can."

Jonathan Freeman-Attwood of British magazine Gramophone felt that marketing such bawdy material as art, in order to reveal the vulgarity of listeners' ancestors, was "a clever selling ploy" designed to shock, particularly given the presence of respectable composers not known for their work in jocular idioms, but nonetheless finds the angle "softened" by the knowledge that 17th century bawdiness "is inseparable from British folk tradition." Although questioning the accuracy of the arrangements' period style, the reviewer found the scores to be imaginative and sophisticated, but opined that, despite being "well-researched and performed", the overall album was conservative and discouraged repeated listening. David Patrick Stevens of the Tarrytown Daily News believed the "X-rated" album differed from the genteel quality of other recordings of the early music movement, saying of the Parental Advisory label being attached to the album: "It's like discovering a porn star in your family tree – until you realize that the late 20th century never has had a corner on sexually explicit art". Stevens believes that such explicit material is necessary in order for people to appreciate "more elevated things".

=== Retrospective appraisal ===
Professional ratings
Review scores
Source	Rating
AllMusic	4/5 stars

Retrospectively, Blair Sanderson of AllMusic praised the audacious selection of material, the "rowdy gusto" of the Merry Companions and the "spice and color" of the Baltimore Consort, concluding that, although intended only for adults unoffended by its coarse subject matter, "this exposé of the seamy side of Renaissance and Baroque music is a delight for those who are game." Virginia Beaton of The Globe and Mail included it first in an "selected discography" of flautist Chris Norman, saying it contains "smutty Renaissance and Baroque songs by Weelkes, Purcell and others." Billboard's Fred Child recommended it as "an Elizabethan celebration of sex and drugs that is quite possibly the only classical recording with a parental advisory sticker."

Benjamin Ivry of The Audiophile Voice deemed it one of several collections of risqué or ribald songs issued by Dorian in the 1990s to balance lightheartedness and musical quality. He comments that the performers present songs like "Pox on You" with "gleeful abandon" and "appropriate sound effects" such as flatulence, helping the production differ from other recordings of early instrumental music. "Indeed," Ivry writes, "one feels glad that Tipper Gore and other advocates of clean lyrics for America's youth limited their attentions to rapstars and the like, and never got to the early music bin in record stores." Similarly, The Daytona Beach Times journalist Rick de Yampert mentioned of the recording's surprising content, "Today's lewd rockers and rappers have nothing on the gents of merry ole England." In 2000, Bradley Bambarger of Billboard reflected that the Baltimore Consort's "playful, folk-tinged virtuosity went down a storm" on both The Art of the Bawdy Song and its followup, La Rocque'n'Roll: Popular Music of Renaissance France (1993), noting the commercial success of both albums.

== Live performances ==
The Baltimore Consort performed songs, ballads and catches from The Art of the Bawdy Song at the 1993 Spoleto Festival USA in Charleston, South Carolina, proving a success with audiences. The consort elected not to play the racier and more profane pieces, such as those about flatulence and explicit sex acts; as Lipkis said, the performance "emphasized the double-entendres and innuendos rather than the single-entendres. It didn't involve the grossest pieces." The consort similarly omitted the coarsest material for their 6pm Candlelight Concert at Moravian's Foy Concert Hall on August 21, 1993, a date at which the group also played material from their next record, LaRocque'n'Roll: Popular Music of Renaissance France.

In June 2011, several members of the Baltimore Consort who performed on Bawdy Song – including co-founder and multi-instrumentalist Mark Cudek, flutist-harpist Mindy Rosenfeld and lutenist Ronn McFarlane – played Plaine & Saucy: Tunes From the British Isles, a program devised by Cudek showcasing 17th and 18th century British tunes, as part of a festival in Cleveland, Ohio. Mark Rosenberg of The Plain Dealer compared the program to The Art of the Bawdy Song.

== Track listing ==
Prelewd

1. "Aniseed Robin" (anon.) – 1:16
2. "Cuckolds All a-Row" (anon.) – 0:58

To the Tavern

3. "I Gave Her Cakes and I Gave Her Ale" (Henry Purcell) – 1:30
4. "Taking His Beer with Old Anacharsis" (Henry Aldrich) – 1:14
5. "Fye, Nay, Prithee John" (Purcell) – 1:04

Men & Maids

6. "Cold and Raw" (Thomas D'Urfey) – 3:58

Coming of Age

1. "The Miller's Daughter" (Purcell) – 1:23
2. "Will Said to His Mammy" (Jones) – 2:38

Anticlimaxes

9. "The Old Fumbler" (anon.) – 1:22
10. "Walking in a Meadowe Greene" (anon.) – 4:54

Measure of the Man

11. "Celia Leaning on the Spinnet" (John Isum) – 1:52
12. "Tom the Taylor" (Purcell) – 1:05
13. "My Lady's Coachman John" (Purcell) – 1:24

Dancing in the Grass

14. "The Irish Jig" or "The Night Ramble" (anon.) – 3:01

Tobacco & Other Stimulants

15. "Come Sirrah Jacke Hoe" (Thomas Weelkes) – 2:26
16. "Dainty Fine Aniseed Water" (anon.) – 1:09
17. "Most Men Do Love the Spanish Wine" (anon.) – 1:16

Interlewd

18. "Argeers" (anon.) – 1:49
19. "Gathering Peascods" (anon.) – 2:14

Scatological Songs

20. "My Lady and Her Maid" (William Ellis) – 0:52
21. "As Roger Last Night to Jenny Lay Close" (Purcell) – 1:31
22. "Pox on You" (Purcell) – 1:45

Fresh Ayre

23. "Ladie Lie Near Me" (anon.) – 2:52

Men & Women

24. "'Tis Women Makes Us Love" (John Blow) – 1:12
25. "Sir Walter Enjoying His Damsel" (Purcell) – 1:15

Her Thing & His Thing

26. "My Thing Is My Own" (anon.) – 4:55
27. "Here Dwells a Pretty Maid" (William Cranford) – 0:39
28. "My Man John Had a Thing That Was Long" (Eccles) – 2:15
29. "When First Amnytas Sued for a Kiss" (anon.) – 3:25

Vinum Bonum

30. "More Palatino" (Jan Pieterszoon Sweelinck) – 3:46
31. "Poor Owen" (John Church) – 3:06
32. "Where They Drink" (Church) – 0:27
33. "Come, Come, Let Us Drink" (Purcell) – 1:20

== Personnel ==
Adapted from the liner notes of The Art of the Bawdy Song

- The Baltimore Consort
  - Mary Anne Ballard – treble viol, bass viol, fiddle, post-session producer, artistic preparation, research, liner notes
  - Mark Cudek – cittern, Renaissance guitar, tenor recorder, belch-canto
  - Custer LaRue – soprano
  - Larry Lipkis – recorders, bass viol
  - Ronn McFarlane – lutes, post-session producer
  - Chris Norman – wooden flutes, pennywhistle
  - Webb Wiggins – virginals, tambourine (Note: His contributions are listed as "Virginals (?!), tambourine")
  - Lorenzo Labbrobacio – guest artist, Fartophone
- The Merry Companions
  - Peter Becker – baritone
  - Alexander Blachly – baritone
  - Paul Shipper – bass, belch-canto
  - James Weaver – baritone
- Douglas Brown – producer, engineer, editor
- Craig D. Dory – engineer
- Brian C. Peters – engineer
- David H. Walters – engineer
- Katherine A. Dory – booklet copyeditor
- Michael P. Chrisner – graphic design
- Brian M. Levine – executive producer

== See also ==
- Music of the United Kingdom
- Mozart and scatology
- 8 Lust Songs: I Sonetti Lussuriosi
- The Manson Family: An Opera (similarly received a warning sticker)
