= David Spelman =

American record producer

David Spelman (born 1966 in Washington, D.C., United States) is an American, New York-based, record producer and curator working in recordings, films and live events

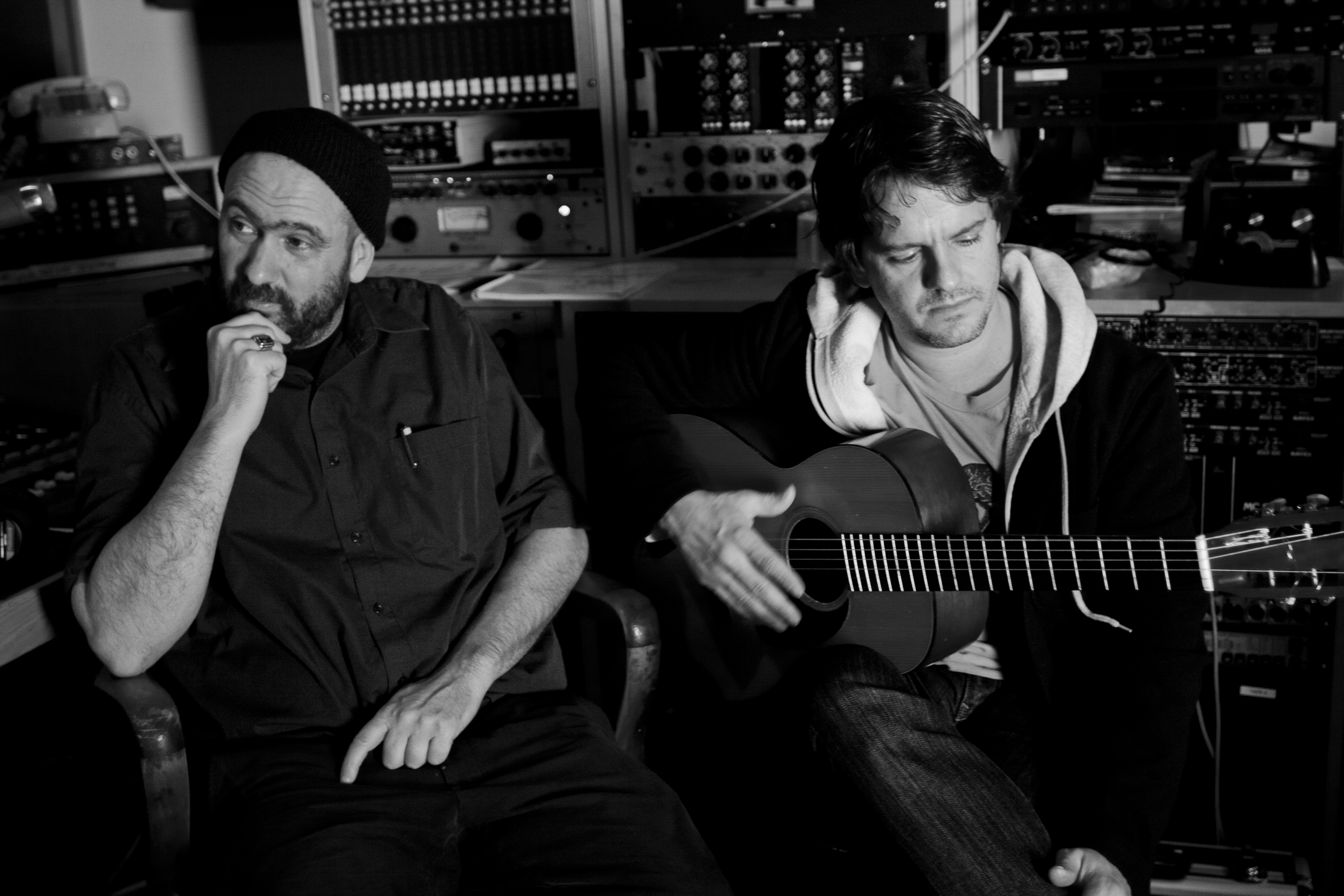
Mark Eitzel (left) and David Spelman during recording sessions for Vidal Sassoon The Movie Photo by Vasilios Sfinarolakis

== Early life ==
Spelman was educated at the Peabody Institute of the Johns Hopkins University and the New England Conservatory, where he was selected as one of the one-hundred most distinguished alumni, as part of the Centenary Celebration of Jordan Hall. At the Peabody Institute he studied renaissance lute with Ronn McFarlane, and performed in the Peabody Renaissance Ensemble. At the New England Conservatory he was a student of classical guitarists David Leisner and Robert Paul Sullivan.

In a 2009 interview, with Allan Kozinn, published in the New York Times Sunday Arts & Leisure, Spelman discussed the influence of classical guitarist and composer Benjamin Verdery, whom he had first encountered in a master class in Santa Cruz, California.

In the 1980s, Spelman trained in acoustic guitar design and construction under Jeff Trougott, the Santa Cruz-based luthier known for making custom acoustic guitars for musicians including Charlie Hunter and John Mayer.

Spelman is the son of Seymour J. Spelman, a labor lawyer and government attorney who ran for Congress in Montgomery County, Maryland, in 1966 as a peace candidate. He is the brother of Judith Spelman, an R.N. and health care advocate, who has authored several legislative bills including “Cal-Care,” a universal health care proposal. He is the cousin of Ron Balin, who co-founded the Mattachine Society of Washington, D.C., in 1961, one of the nation’s first homosexual civil rights organizations.

== New York Guitar Festival ==
Together with author and WNYC Radio host John Schaefer, Spelman founded the New York Guitar Festival in 1999. The festival's first season included just three concerts at Merkin Concert Hall, but in later years expanded to include venues throughout the city, including Carnegie Hall, The World Financial Center Winter Garden, The 92nd Street Y, Joe's Pub, The Jazz Standard, Le Poisson Rogue, Flushing Town Hall, Makor, BB King Blues Club, The Monkey, Barbes, The Apple Store theater in SoHo, and various pop-up venues. The festival attracts recognition in the international media, has built partnerships with leading NPR stations for live radio broadcasts, and assisted in the launch of sister festivals in the United States, Europe, Canada and Australia[2]. Spelman serves as the festival's Artistic Director.

== Film projects ==
In 2010, Spelman served as music supervisor for Vidal Sassoon The Movie, a feature-length documentary about revolutionary hairstylist Vidal Sassoon. The soundtrack features music by American Music Club's Mark Eitzel (who contributed a cover of the Ira Gershwin song 'S Wonderful), post-rock chamber ensembles Clogs (featuring Padma Newsome and Bryce Dessner of The National), Redhooker, and Arcade Fire side project Bell Orchestre. The film had its premiere at the 2010 Tribeca Film Festival.

Spelman has commissioned scores by Justin Vernon of Bon Iver, Bill Frisell, Marc Ribot, James Blackshaw, Gyan Riley, David Bromberg, Steve Kimock, Alex de Grassi, and Chicha Libra, for classic silent films by Charlie Chaplin, Buster Keaton, Harry Everett Smith, Yasujirō Ozu, Wu Yonggang, and Georges Méliès.

== Luminato – Toronto Festival of Arts and Creativity ==
Luminato, Canada’s largest multi-disciplinary arts festival, hired Spelman in 2009 as Guest Curator. The Globe and Mail's James Bradshaw wrote: "to attract top-flight talent, Luminato tapped into the mind and rolodex of David Spelman." Programing highlights included outdoor concerts by Goran Bregovic, The Derek Trucks Band, Daniel Lanois, Taj Mahal, Randy Bachman, Pandit Debashish Bhattacharya, an all-day Brazilian Guitar Marathon (co-curated by The Assad Duo), and a sold-out tribute to Neil Young at Massey Hall, featuring the Cowboy Junkies; Holly Cole; Danny Michel; Steven Page; Carole Pope; Bill Frisell Trio; Issa (formerly Jane Siberry); Colin Linden; Stevie Jackson (Belle & Sebastian); Harry Manx; Jason Collett; Sarah Slean and musical director Kevin Breit. The Neil Young tribute attracted front page coverage in local and national newspapers, and was broadcast on CBC Radio.

== Multimedia projects ==
Spelman has presented a number of large-scale multimedia projects, including the world premieres of Phil Kline’s World on a String, Bill Frisell’s The Great Flood, Daniel Lanois’ Silvio, Aaron and Bryce Dessner’s The Long Count, and The Apollo Project a 30th anniversary live re-imagining of Brian Eno's Apollo: Atmospheres and Soundtracks, featuring members of Phish, Tortoise, the Brooklyn ambient ensemble Itsnotyouitsme, and filmmaker Craig Teper.

The Great Flood, a collaboration between Bill Frisell and experimental filmmaker Bill Morrison, was based on the Mississippi River Flood of 1927 and the ensuing transformation of American society and music. It had its premiere at the Krannert Center for the Performing Arts, and has since been performed at Carnegie Hall, the Kennedy Center, and throughout Europe, including venues in Poland, Denmark, Sweden, Norway, France, England, Ireland, Portugal, Belgium, Germany, Austria, and Greece. The critic John Fordman, writing in The Guardian, called The Great Flood "one of the highlights of the 2012 London Jazz Festival." The project was the third collaboration between Frisell and filmmaker Bill Morrison, who has worked with some of the most important composers of our time, including John Adams, Gavin Bryars, Henryk Gorecki, David Lang, Harry Partch, and Steve Reich.

The Long Count had its premiere on September 11, 2009 at the Krannert Center for the Performing Arts, and was a collaboration between visual artist Matthew Ritchie and twin brothers Aaron and Bryce Dessner, best known as members of the indie rock band The National. The multimedia work was loosely based on the Mayan creation story Popol Vuh and included a 12 piece orchestra and four guest singers; Kim Deal, Kelley Deal, Matt Berninger, and Shara Worden. Following the Krannert Center performance, the work had its New York premiere at the Brooklyn Academy of Music, and traveled to London's Barbican Center, and Amsterdam as part of the Holland Festival.

In 2006, Spelman partnered with Carnegie Hall to co-commission the guitarist-composer Bill Frisell to present a program of new works featuring the world premiere of a multimedia piece created in collaboration with visual artist Jim Woodring. Woodring is an American cartoonist, fine artist, writer and toy designer, best known for the dream-based comics be published in his magazine Jim, and as the creator of the anthropomorphic cartoon character Frank, who has appeared in a number of short comics and graphic novels. The evening featured Bill Frisell's 858 Quartet and with Jenny Scheinman (violin), Eyvind Kang (viola), Hank Roberts (cello), and special guests Ron Miles (trumpet), and Greg Tardy (tenor sax and clarinet).

== Literary events ==
In April 2009, for National Poetry Month, Arts World Financial Center enlisted David Spelman to curate and produce a tribute to Pablo Neruda, the 1971 Nobel Prize in Literature winner. The event, Songs of Love & Despair: A Musical Tribute to Pablo Neruda, featured performances and readings by Clogs, the Czech experimental musician Irene & Vojtech Havel, Chilean poet Cecilia Vicuña, Colin Stetson (Sway Machinery, Bell Orchestre, Arcade Fire), Pedro Soler with Basque vocal improviser Beñat Achiary, poet and Bowery Poetry Club founder Bob Holman, experimental performance artist Laurie Anderson, and rock musician Lou Reed.

In 2005 and 2006 Spelman was appointed curator of Other Words/Other Worlds, a festival celebrating National Jazz and Poetry Month at Flushing Town Hall in Queens, New York. The festival featured workshops, film screenings, musical performances, and a 24-hour poetry jam session. Musicians who performed included Matthew Shipp, The Nat Jones Trio, Peter Apfelbaum, Chris Cheek, as well as local high-school jazz ensembles. Readings included Spanish, Russian, Korean and Chinese poets, a second grade poetry club, and poets Everton Sylverton, Bob Holman, and Hal Sirowitz.

In the early 1990s Spelman served as music director and co-producer of Third Friday Respite, a series of literary readings and classical music performances at Manhattan's Church of the Advent Hope. Highlights included a reading of C.S. Lewis’ Screwtape Letters as well as a year-long, complete reading of John Milton's epic 17th century poem Paradise Lost.

== Visual arts ==
As a visual arts curator, Spelman has organized gallery exhibits in New York and Toronto by photographers Ralph Gibson, Danny Clinch, Andy Summers, Jack Vartoogian, Steve Sherman, Rahav Segev, and Hank O’Neal. He has also organized an exhibition of vintage music posters by Milton Glaser.

== Krannert Center for the Performing Arts ==
In 2005 Spelman was invited to launch and oversee a biannual guitar festival in Urbana, Illinois, modeled on the New York Guitar Festival. The three-day festival attracts more than 15 thousand patrons, and has received praise in Chicago, Guitar Player, and Down Beat. Initially called The Wall To Wall Guitar Festival, the festival's name was changed in 2009 to Ellnora, The Guitar Festival, in honor of Ellnora Krannert, one of the founders of the Krannert Center for the Performing Arts.

On September 11, 2009, the festival presented the world premiere of The Long Count, a 70-minute multi-media work described as "twin brothers Aaron and Bryce Dessner, best known as members of The National, join their musicianship with the narrative, set, and film work of visual artist Matthew Ritchie for an hour-long phenomenon that weaves the colors and cardinal directions of Mayan myth with the layout of a baseball diamond in an exploration of time and space commissioned by the Brooklyn Academy of Music. Singers Matt Berninger (of The National), Shara Worden (of My Brightest Diamond), and sisters Kim and Kelley Deal (of The Breeders) will perform original compositions by the Dessners that will fuse with the continuous soundscape of a 12-person orchestra for a condensed visual epic brought to life through projected images and a mirrored stage surface." Following the Krannert Center performance, the work had its New York premiere in October 2009 at the Brookylyn Academy of Music, travels to Amsterdam in June 2011 as part of the Holland Festival, and there are plans for an album release.

The 2011 Ellnora festival took place September 8–10 and the line-up included Luther Dickinson as Artist-in-Residence, the world premiere of a multimedia work about the 1927 Mississippi River flood by Bill Frisell and filmmaker Bill Morrison, and performances by Calexico, Lee Ranaldo, My Brightest Diamond, Richard Thompson, Daniel Lanois’ Black Dub, Sharon Isbin, Taj Mahal, the Carolina Chocolate Drops, Adrian Belew, Robert Randolph, The Tony Rice Unit, Cindy Cashdollar, and Marc Ribot.

== Adelaide Festival Centre, Australia ==
In 2007, Spelman was recruited by the Adelaide Festival Centre to launch and oversee artistic direction of a major international music festival. The ten-day Adelaide International Guitar Festival was modeled on the New York Guitar Festival, and drew 30 thousand people in the first year. The event had a three-million dollar budget and received a four-year grant from the South Australian Government. The Adelaide Review wrote that "never before have we had a festival like this... the Guitar Festival was a roaring success and an unqualified winner." Rolling Stone called it "a genuinely international event."

== Live concert tributes ==
Spelman has created a number of concert tributes to landmark record albums. In 2004 he produced the Blood on the Tracks Project, a concert at New York City's Merkin Concert Hall celebrating the 30th anniversary of the Bob Dylan album. The event was broadcast live on WFUV and as a two-hour radio special, syndicated to more than fifty NPR affiliates. His 2006 Nebraska Project, featured a diverse set of performers, including Dan Zanes, Michelle Shocked, The National, Chocolate Genius, Martha Wainwright, and Bruce Springsteen, and received extensive press coverage, including The New York Times, Rolling Stone, Spin, Billboard, and Pitchfork. The concert was filmed, with Fugazi's Brendan Canty directing, for future DVD release. In 2007 his two-night American Beauty Project included performances by Jay Farrar, The Holmes Brothers, Sex Mob, Jim Lauderdale, Ollabelle, Dar Williams, and The Klezmatics, drew capacity crowds at New York's Winter Garden, has toured to several cities in North America, and in January 2009 had a repeat performance at Lincoln Center for the Performing Arts as part of the American Songbook series.

Other multi-artist tributes produced by Spelman include New York concerts celebrating the musical legacies of Andrés Segovia, Jimi Hendrix, Leo Kottke, Michael Hedges, John Fahey, Skip James, Robert Johnson, Charley Patton, Elizabeth Cotten, Neil Young, George Harrison, Jerry Garcia, Tom Waits, Hank Williams, Merle Haggard, Loretta Lynn, Lefty Frizzell, the Reverend Gary Davis, Mississippi John Hurt, and Terry Riley.

== Sonic Garden Arts Collective ==
In 2011, Spelman and a group of friends launched an arts collective called Sonic Garden. The organization's mission statement, posted on their blog, states: "Based in the micro-urban beach community of Springsteen lore, Asbury Park, New Jersey, Sonic Garden is an association of musos, writers, architects, baristas, painters, surfers and winos committed to pursuing artistic development through residences, exhibitions, and education programs which foster dialogue across disciplines and barstools."

The first public series coincided with the alternative-music festival All Tomorrow's Parties, and included performances and talks featuring award-winning filmmakers, cartoonists, musicians and visual artists. The TriCity News' Dan Jacobson wrote that: "This is serious stuff. What Spelman is initiating is among the most promising events we've seen for Asbury Park, If it catches on, it could be big. And it could spin off in all different and promising ways for our city."

== Record production, session work, discography ==
- Vidal Sassoon The Movie, (feature documentary soundtrack, 2010): Music Supervisor/Producer.
- Bunker Fallout, Elija B Torn (theycontrol.us, 2009): guitarist.
- Highway Dancing, The Yearlings (Mixmasters, 2008): Producer. The third full-length recording by The Yearlings, a roots/alternative country duo, from Australia. The album featured contributions by Larry Campbell (pedal steel, dobro, mandolin, fiddle), as well as Glenn Patscha, Byron Isaacs, and Tony Leone, members of the Brooklyn-based band Ollabelle.
- The Virginia EP, The National, (Brassland, 2008). Mixing Engineer, for "Mansion on the Hill", originally recorded by Bruce Springsteen.
- Guitar Harvest (Solid Air, 2005): Co-producer. A two-CD compilation, featuring Andy Summers, Bill Frisell, Vernon Reid, Ralph Towner, Henry Kaiser, Alex de Grassi and other artists. Mojo gave it a four-star review, saying "This largely acoustic set is guaranteed to leave guitar buffs drooling," while Total Guitar noted that "Not only does it feature some of the most astonishing guitar playing we’ve heard all year... but all proceeds go to buying guitars and guitar lessons for inner city kids."
- Various releases on the Artemis/Vanguard label (2003–2005): Compilation Producer.
- The Telemark Movie, (documentary soundtrack, 1990) arranger/guitarist.
