= Steven Miller (music producer) =

American record producer (born 1956)

Steven Miller (born November 8, 1956, in New Jersey) is an American record producer and executive. He is best known for his association with Windham Hill Records, where his ambient sound helped create notable instrumental recordings such as Michael Hedges’ Aerial Boundaries, Mark Isham’s Vapor Drawings and George Winston’s December.

As a guitarist and keyboardist, Miller released a recording of his own compositions, Singing Whale Songs in a Low Voice (on his Hip Pocket/Windham Hill Jazz imprint) which featured Isham and pianist Art Lande. He also worked with many of the other Windham Hill artists, including label founder William Ackerman, Liz Story, Alex de Grassi, Darol Anger, Barbara Higbie, Scott Cossu, Nightnoise, Michael Manring and Andy Narell. Together with Narell, he created the original music for Apple’s early and mid-1980s products Apple IIe, Lisa, and Macintosh.

Miller has been actively involved in new technology. He and Ackerman developed a system of pressing records which enabled the label to domestically manufacture and sell audiophile quality LPs for standard LP retail price. He was also one of the first producers to fully embrace digital recording. During the transition years from vinyl to compact discs, his recordings were frequently played at Hi-Fi shops to demonstrate the CD's extended dynamic range. In recognition of his work, he was appointed to the board of the RIAA’s Compact Disc Group.

After Windham Hill, Miller worked as an A&R executive at RCA Records and then briefly left the business. Upon returning to music, he has worked independently with a wide range of artists in the singer-songwriter, pop and jazz genres.

Singer-songwriters he has worked with include Richard Marx, Suzanne Vega, Dar Williams, John Gorka, Patty Griffin, David Broza, Paula Cole, and Glen Phillips.

Pop artists include Toad the Wet Sprocket, Pink, Dave Matthews Band, Backstreet Boys, Switchfoot, Chicago, G. Love and Jack Johnson.

Jazz artists include Manhattan Transfer, Michael Brecker, Medeski, Martin and Wood, Rick Braun, Bobby McFerrin, Paquito D’Rivera, and Dave Valentin.

In partnership with Allen Sides and Ocean Way Recording in Hollywood, he created Ocean Way Drums – a high end musical instrument plugin that was introduced at the 2008 NAMM Show.

In 2014, music journalist Ben Fong-Torres inducted Miller into the San Francisco State University Hall of Fame.

== Discography ==
- 1983 Singing Whale Songs in a Low Voice (Hip Pocket Records HP-102)
