= Roger Harmon =

American musicologist and lutenist

Roger Harmon is an American musicologist and lutenist who taught lute at the Peabody Conservatory in Baltimore, Maryland. He is noted for founding the Baltimore Consort in 1980 with flutist Mindy Rosenfeld, which performed successfully for several years before releasing On the Banks of the Helicon, their first album for Dorian Recordings. Roger Harmon's research has focused mainly on ancient music theory.

Notable students include lutenist and composer Ronn McFarlane.

== Works ==
Selected recordings include:

- Swiss Lute Music - Lute Music from Swiss Manuscripts

Selected publications include:

- The repertoires of the lute, vihuela, and guitar: 1507-1790
- Studies in the Cambridge Lute Manuscripts
- Listeners in depictions of Orpheus and Francesco da Milano
