= Breakfast in the Field =

Studio album by Michael Hedges
- Released: 1981
- Recorded: The Music Annex, Menlo Park, CA
- Genre: New-age, world
- Length: 33:43
- Label: Windham Hill
- Producer: Will Ackerman

Michael Hedges chronology
Breakfast in the Field (1981)	Aerial Boundaries (1984)

Breakfast in the Field is the debut recording by guitarist Michael Hedges released on the Windham Hill label in 1981. It was recorded live to 2-track, with no overdubs.

According to the album's liner notes, Hedges composed and recorded "Eleven Small Roaches", "Baby Toes" and "Two Days Old" on a six-string guitar built in 1978 by Ken DuBourg of Arbutus, Maryland. The remaining tracks were recorded using a guitar made by Ervin Somogyi.

== Reception ==
Professional ratings
Review scores
Source	Rating
AllMusic	4/5 stars

Music critic Jason Anderson, writing for AllMusic, stated "Hedges' compositional abilities alone would have been enough to mesmerize musicians and audiophiles, but his added improvisational skills put this recording way over the top both technically and artistically... While Hedges' follow-up, Aerial Boundaries, is often described as the guitarist's masterpiece, Breakfast in the Field has an early career spark and meditative yet passionate conviction that can't be surpassed.."

== Track listing ==
All compositions by Michael Hedges.

1. "Layover" – 2:32
2. "The Happy Couple" – 3:23
3. "Eleven Small Roaches" – 3:01
4. "The Funky Avocado" – 2:05
5. "Baby Toes" – 2:12
6. "Breakfast in the Field" – 2:23
7. "Two Days Old" – 4:44
8. "Peg Leg Speed King" – 3:20
9. "The Unexpected Visitor" – 2:49
10. "Silent Anticipations" – 3:19
11. "Lenono" – 3:55

== Personnel ==
- Michael Hedges – acoustic guitar
- Michael Manring – fretless bass ("The Funky Avocado", "Baby Toes", "Two Days Old", "Lenono")
- George Winston – piano ("Lenono")

== Production notes ==
- Produced by Will Ackerman
- Engineered by Russell Bond
- Design by Anne Robinson
