= Torn Between Dimensions =

Studio album by At War With Self
- Released: February 22, 2005
- Recorded: Indiana and California
- Genre: Progressive metal
- Label: Free Electric Sound, Laser's Edge
- Producer: Ken Golden

At War With Self chronology
Torn Between Dimensions (2005)	Acts of God (2007)

Torn Between Dimensions is the debut album by At War With Self. It was Glenn Snelwar's first album after he appeared on the first Gordian Knot album.

== Track listing ==
1. "The God Interface" (4:04)
2. "Torn Between Dimensions" (5:57)
3. "A Gap In the Stream of Mind - Part I" (4:11)
4. "Grasping At Nothing" (5:22)
5. "Coming Home" (5:30)
6. "The Event Horizon" (5:18)
7. "A Gap In the Stream of Mind - Part II" (7:45)
8. "Run" (3:04)
9. "A Gap in the Stream of Mind - Part III" (1:37)
10. "At War With Self" (7:17)

== Personnel ==
=== Band members ===
- Glenn Snelwar - electric and acoustic guitars, mandolins, keyboards, e-bow, string arrangements, programming

=== Guest musicians ===
- Michael Manring - fretless bass and e-bow
- Mark Zonder - drums, percussion
