= José Lemos =

José Lemos may refer to:

- José Lemos (athlete) (born 1991), Colombian athlete
- José Lemos (countertenor) (born 1974), Brazilian countertenor
- José Lemos (footballer) (1962–2023), Spanish footballer
