= New York Guitar Festival =

Music festival

The New York Guitar Festival is a music festival founded by radio host and author John Schaefer and musician, producer and curator David Spelman, who serves at the festival's Artistic Director. Since 1999, the festival "has been examining virtually every aspect of the guitar's musical personality," and has launched sister festivals in cities in the United States, Europe, Canada and Australia. Festival events take place at venues including Carnegie Hall, The World Financial Center Winter Garden, The 92nd Street Y, Merkin Concert Hall, Joe's Pub, The Jazz Standard, Le Poisson Rougue, Flushing Town Hall, Makor, BB King Blues Club, The Monkey, Barbes, and The Apple Store, SoHo.

== Commissions and premieres ==
NYGF 2010: The festival commissioned scores by Justin Vernon of Bon Iver, Marc Ribot, James Blackshaw, Gyan Riley, David Bromberg, Steve Kimock, Alex de Grassi, and Chicha Libra, for classic silent films by Charlie Chaplin, Buster Keaton and Harry Everett Smith.

NYGF 2008: Premieres by Arthur Kampela and Stephan Crump's Rosetta Trio.

NYGF 2006: New film scores, instrumental works, and multimedia collaborations by Bill Frisell, Daniel Lanois, Bryce Dessner, Dominic Frasca, Gyan Riley, Leni Stern, Henry Kaiser, Brandon Ross, and Alex de Grassi.

== Featured performers ==
- Ben Allison
- Badi Assad
- Sergio Assad
- Pierre Bensusan
- Rory Block
- Oren Bloedow
- Roy Book Binder
- Kevin Breit
- Anouar Brahem
- Brazilian Guitar Quartet
- David Bromberg
- Bob Brozman
- Jim Campilongo
- The Campbell Brothers
- Larry Campbell
- California Guitar Trio
- Laura Cantrell
- Vinicius Cantuaria
- Cindy Cashdollar
- Jen Chapin Trio
- Chocolate Genius, Inc.
- Larry Coryell
- Yamandu Costa
- William Coulter
- Marshall Crenshaw
- Alex de Grassi
- Bryce Dessner
- Mamadou Diabate
- Abdoulaye Diabate
- Roland Dyens
- Mark Eitzel
- Eliot Fisk
- Dominic Frasca
- Bill Frisell
- Kevin R. Gallagher
- Mick Goodrick
- Emmylou Harris
- Jesse Harris
- Alvin Youngblood Hart
- Ernie Hawkins
- Levon Helm
- Megan Hickey
- Jolie Holland
- Jason Isbell
- Stevie Jackson
- Henry Kaiser
- Jorma Kaukonen
- Steve Kimock
- Lenny Kaye
- Kaki King
- Leo Kottke
- Sonny Landreth
- Daniel Lanois
- The Last Town Chorus
- Patty Larkin
- Jim Lauderdale
- Greg Leisz
- Romero Lubambo
- Gary Lucas
- Virginia Luque
- Russell Malone
- Michael Manring
- Harry Manx
- Martha Masters
- Bill Morrissey
- Wolfgang Muthspiel
- The National
- Ollabelle
- New World Guitar Trio
- Jimmy Norman
- Paul O'Dette
- Christopher Parkening
- The Persuasions
- Kelly Joe Phelps
- Bucky Pizzarelli
- Toshi Reagon
- Vernon Reid
- John Renbourn
- Tony Rice
- Marc Ribot
- Terry Riley
- Pepe Romero
- Peter Rowan
- Julia Sarr
- Mike Seeger
- Sex Mob
- Simon Shaheen
- Elliott Sharp
- Michelle Shocked
- Bill Sims
- Ricky Skaggs & Kentucky Thunder
- GE Smith
- Hopkinson Smith
- Tim Sparks
- Bruce Springsteen
- David Starobin
- Leni Stern
- Mark Stewart
- Marty Stuart
- Andy Summers
- Taj Mahal
- Otis Taylor
- Teddy Thompson
- Steve Tibbetts
- Tin Hat Trio
- David Torn
- Artie Traum
- David Tronzo
- Tony Trischka
- Toubab Krewe
- Turtle Island String Quartet
- Justin Vernon
- Ana Vidovic
- Jason Vieaux
- Frank Vignola
- Martha Wainwright
- George Winston
- Min Xiao-Fen
- Dan Zanes
- Zubot and Dawson
- Natalia Zukerman

== About John Schaefer ==
John Schaefer has hosted and produced the popular new-music radio program New Sounds since 1982. Schaefer's program was called "The #1 radio show for the Global Village" by Billboard magazine. He is also executive producer and host of the nationally syndicated series Chamber Music New York. Since 1986, he has produced and hosted New Sounds Live, an annual series of live broadcast concerts devoted to many types of new, unusual and overlooked forms of music. Since 1991 he has produced and hosted WNYC's programs of classical performances, both in studio and in various concert halls. He has been heard regularly on the BBC, the ABC (Australia), Taipei Public Radio and Radio New Zealand. Schaefer's writings include New Sounds: A Listener's Guide to New Music (Harper & Row, NY, 1987; Virgin Books, London, 1990); a biography of composer La Monte Young (in Sound and Light, Bucknell University Press, 1996); and Songlines: The Voice in World Music (Cambridge Companion to Singing, Cambridge University Press, UK, 2000). He was contributing editor for Spin and Ear magazines, and has written numerous articles and reviews. His liner notes appear on more than 100 recordings, ranging from The Music of Cambodia to recordings by Yo-Yo Ma, Bobby McFerrin, and Terry Riley.

In 2003 Schaefer joined an elite group of honorees when he was presented with the American Music Center's prestigious Letter of Distinction for his "substantial contributions to advancing the field of contemporary American music in the United States and abroad."

In May 2006, New York Magazine cited Schaefer as one of "the people whose ideas, power, and sheer will are changing New York" in its Influentials issue.

== About David Spelman ==
David Spelman was educated at the Peabody Institute of the Johns Hopkins University and the New England Conservatory. In addition to his work with the New York Guitar Festival, he works as a music supervisor in the film industry and serves as an artistic advisor to festivals at the Krannert Center for the Performing Arts at the University of Illinois, the Concertgebouw of Amsterdam, Australia's Adelaide Festival Centre, and Toronto's Luminato Festival.

As a visual arts curator, Spelman has organized gallery exhibits by photographers Ralph Gibson, Danny Clinch, Andy Summers, Jack Vartoogian, Steve Sherman, Rahav Segev, and Hank O'Neal. He has also organized an exhibition of vintage music posters by Milton Glaser.

In the 1980s, Spelman trained in acoustic guitar design and construction under luthier Jeff Trougott.

== Guitar Harvest ==
Guitar Harvest is a two-CD recording produced by David Spelman and John Schaefer in 2003, featuring Andy Summers, Bill Frisell, Vernon Reid, Ralph Towner, Henry Kaiser, Alex de Grassi and other artists. Mojo gave it a four-star review, saying "This largely acoustic set is guaranteed to leave guitar buffs drooling", while Total Guitar noted that "Not only does it feature some of the most astonishing guitar playing we've heard all year… but all proceeds go to buying guitars and guitar lessons for inner city kids".
