= Adelaide Guitar Festival =

Music festival in Adelaide, South Australia

The Adelaide Guitar Festival (AGF), formerly the Adelaide International Guitar Festival (AGIF) was Australia's largest guitar festival, held biennially in the South Australian capital of Adelaide. Founded in 2007 by former CEO of the Adelaide Festival Centre, Douglas Gautier, the last edition took place in September–October 2025. The AGF was the sister event to the New York Guitar Festival, and features local, national and international artists across a variety of genres including rock, jazz, classical, experimental, blues and roots music. Slava Grigoryan was artistic director of the festival from 2010 until 2025.

Annual events associated with AGF were Guitars In Bars, Winter School, the Adelaide International Classical Guitar Competition and Resonance.

== History ==
Following negotiations with the New York Guitar Festival's founder David Spelman, South Australian Premier Mike Rann announced in 2007 that Adelaide would stage the first Adelaide International Guitar Festival later in the year. It would be the sister festival to the New York Guitar Festival.

The AIGF began as part of the plan to make the Adelaide Festival Centre "the nation's most innovative arts hub", under CEO Douglas Gautier. Spelman served as the founding artistic director for the Festival and continued to serve as an international program advisor. The ten-day festival was modelled on the New York Guitar Festival, and drew 30,000 people in the first year. The Adelaide Advertiser wrote that "never before have we had a festival like this... the Guitar Festival was a roaring success and an unqualified winner". Rolling Stone called it "a genuinely international event... curated by David Spelman, the man behind the world-famous New York Guitar Festival". Over 100 musicians from around the world performed in over 40 events, spanning many genres, with attendance at the ten-day festival in excess of 30,000.

In March 2009 it was announced that Slava Grigoryan had been appointed artistic director for the 2010 Festival. On 30 March the Adelaide Festival Centre CEO, Douglas Gautier, along with Grigoryan, announced the festival was to become a biennial event, to enable better planning and preparation. However, it again became an annual event in 2021.

On 28 November 2025 it was announced by new Festival Centre CEO Kate Gould that there would be no further editions of the festival.

== Past festivals ==
Taking place from 9 to 12 August, the 2018 event featured 20 international artists, and included five world premieres and two Australian premieres. Performers included Tommy Emmanuel, Pedro Javier Gonzalez, Richard Smith, Tony McManus and Albert Lee, South African Derek Gripper, Kaki King and Marc Ribot. Perth's Abbe May and Adelaide locals Kelly Menhennett and Hana and Jessie-Lee also appeared. Julia Zemiro interviewed some of the musicians and hosted the festival finale.

The 2025 event took place from 10 September – 12 October, and featured John Butler, Lior, Troy Cassar-Daley in a concert opened by Barkindji singer Nancy Bates, a tribute to Led Zeppelin's Physical Graffiti, and an orchestra of 50 guitarists aged from 10 to 79.

== Associated annual events ==
=== Guitars in Bars ===
Music SA has run the annual Umbrella: Winter City Sounds event since 2016, growing each year. In association with the Adelaide Guitar Festival, it presented "Guitars in Bars" as part of Umbrella. This event was open to everyone, and helped to connect musicians with venues through a venue directory. Venues included a guitar store in Port Lincoln, a brewery on Yorke Peninsula, and a distillery in the Riverland in 2019.

=== Other events ===
In addition to Guitars In Bars, the Winter School, the Adelaide International Classical Guitar Competition and a program known as Resonance – where world-class musicians take their music to hospitals, aged care homes and community centres – were held annually.
