= Aerial Boundaries =

Studio album by Michael Hedges
- Released: July 2, 1984
- Recorded: Various locations
- Genres: New-age, world
- Length: 37:36
- Label: Windham Hill
- Producers: Will Ackerman, Michael Hedges, Steven Miller

Michael Hedges chronology
Breakfast in the Field (1981)	Aerial Boundaries (1984)	Watching My Life Go By (1985)

Aerial Boundaries is the second studio album by American guitarist Michael Hedges, released by Windham Hill Records on July 2, 1984. Consisting primarily of solo steel-string acoustic guitar performances, the album also features bassist Michael Manring and flutist Mindy Rosenfeld.

The album received a nomination for Best Engineered Recording – Non-Classical at the 27th Annual Grammy Awards. The nomination credited engineers Oliver DiCicco, Michael Hedges, Steven Miller and Bill Mueller.

== Recording and composition ==
Much of Aerial Boundaries was recorded directly to two-track master tape. Tracks 1–4 and 6 were recorded at the Windham Hill Inn in West Townshend, Vermont, using a remote recording truck. "After the Gold Rush" was recorded at Sheffield Studio in Baltimore, while "The Magic Farmer" was recorded at Different Fur Studio in San Francisco.

"Spare Change" was realized at the Peabody Electronic Music Studio in Baltimore. According to the album credits, all of the sounds on the track originated from guitar; Hedges engineered and edited the piece himself before it was mixed to digital by Steven Miller. "Ménage à Trois" was recorded at Mobius Music in San Francisco and mixed at A&M Studios in Los Angeles.

The album is performed largely on Hedges's 1971 Martin D-28, which he nicknamed "Barbara". Hedges's arrangement of Neil Young's "After the Gold Rush" features Manring on fretless bass, while Manring and Rosenfeld also appear on "Ménage à Trois".

== Reception ==
Professional ratings
Review scores
Source	Rating
AllMusic	5/5 stars
Encyclopedia of Popular Music	5/5 stars

Daniel Gioffre of AllMusic gave the album five stars, praising Hedges's combination of instrumental technique and composition and describing it as one of the strongest acoustic-guitar recordings.

The album has subsequently been regarded as an influential recording in modern acoustic guitar. In a 2023 retrospective for Tidal, Mac Randall described Aerial Boundaries as a landmark album that expanded contemporary expectations of the acoustic guitar, discussing its recording sessions with producers Steven Miller and Will Ackerman.

== Track listing ==
All compositions were written and arranged by Michael Hedges except "After the Gold Rush", written by Neil Young.

No.	Title	Length
1.	"Aerial Boundaries"	4:45
2.	"Bensusan"	2:30
3.	"Rickover's Dream"	5:00
4.	"Ragamuffin"	3:15
5.	"After the Gold Rush" (Neil Young)	4:10
6.	"Hot Type"	1:31
7.	"Spare Change"	5:45
8.	"Ménage à Trois"	7:10
9.	"The Magic Farmer"	3:50

=== Recording locations ===
- Tracks 1–4 and 6 – recorded live to two-track digital master at the Windham Hill Inn, West Townshend, Vermont
- Track 5 – recorded live to two-track master at Sheffield Studio, Baltimore, Maryland
- Track 7 – realized at the Peabody Electronic Music Studio, Baltimore
- Track 8 – recorded at Mobius Music, San Francisco, California; mixed at A&M Studios, Los Angeles
- Track 9 – recorded live to two-track master at Different Fur Studio, San Francisco

== Personnel ==
Credits adapted from the album's liner notes.

=== Musicians ===
- Michael Hedges – acoustic guitar
- Michael Manring – fretless bass on "After the Gold Rush" and "Ménage à Trois"
- Mindy Rosenfeld – flute on "Ménage à Trois"

=== Production ===
- Will Ackerman – producer
- Michael Hedges – producer; engineering and editing on "Spare Change"
- Steven Miller – producer, engineering, mixing
- Oliver DiCicco – engineering on "Ménage à Trois"
- Bill Mueller – engineering on "After the Gold Rush"
- Tom Arrison – engineering assistance
- Nick Gutfreund – engineering assistance
- Bernie Grundman – original mastering
- Mark Boeddeker – digital transfers
- Richard Santangelo – cover photography
- Cathye English – liner photography
- Anne Ackerman Robinson – design
