= Ervin Somogyi =

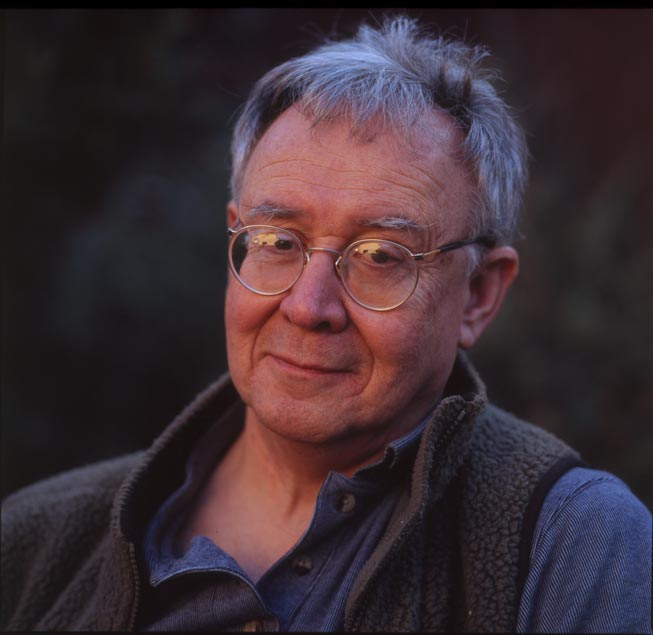
Ervin V. Somogyi, Luthier

Ervin V. Somogyi (born 1944) is a maker of high-end steel string guitars. He is known for his craftsmanship, and places particular emphasis on the voicing of his instruments' soundboards. He is also an influential teacher.

== Background ==
Born in Budapest, Hungary, Ervin Somogyi fled Europe with his family during World War II. After living in Austria, England, Cuba and Mexico, he eventually moved to the United States at age 15. After graduating from UC Berkeley with a degree in English, he joined the Peace Corps, worked in a mental hospital, attended graduate school and supported himself as a flamenco guitarist, but he eventually gravitated back to the East Bay, which has been his home base since about 1972, he says.

Building guitars started out as a hobby. At first, Somogyi had little hope of making a living at it, he says. With few how-to books available or schools where he could take classes, he learned primarily by getting his hands on some well-made instruments and studying them. "It was a very oddball activity," he says. Now, as one of the "grand old men" of American lutherie, Somogyi is often invited to lecture at guitar shows and exhibitions.

Building primarily high-end steel-string guitars that sell for over $49,800 each, Somogyi cultivates a clientele of serious musicians—such as the late John Denver and Michael Hedges, and fingerstyle master Alex de Grassi—as well as collectors who buy his instruments as investments. Recording artists such as Daniel Hecht and George Winston list Somogyi as the builder of their guitars for several past and present albums.

Working in his Temescal district shop, he creates exactly one handmade, steel-string acoustic guitar per month, twelve annually (he doesn't take vacations), [more than] 456 since he started in the early 1970s.

He has written two volumes on lutherie, "The Responsive Guitar" and "Making the Responsive Guitar", as well as "Voicing the Guitar", a DVD produced at the Healdsburg Guitar Festival in 2009.

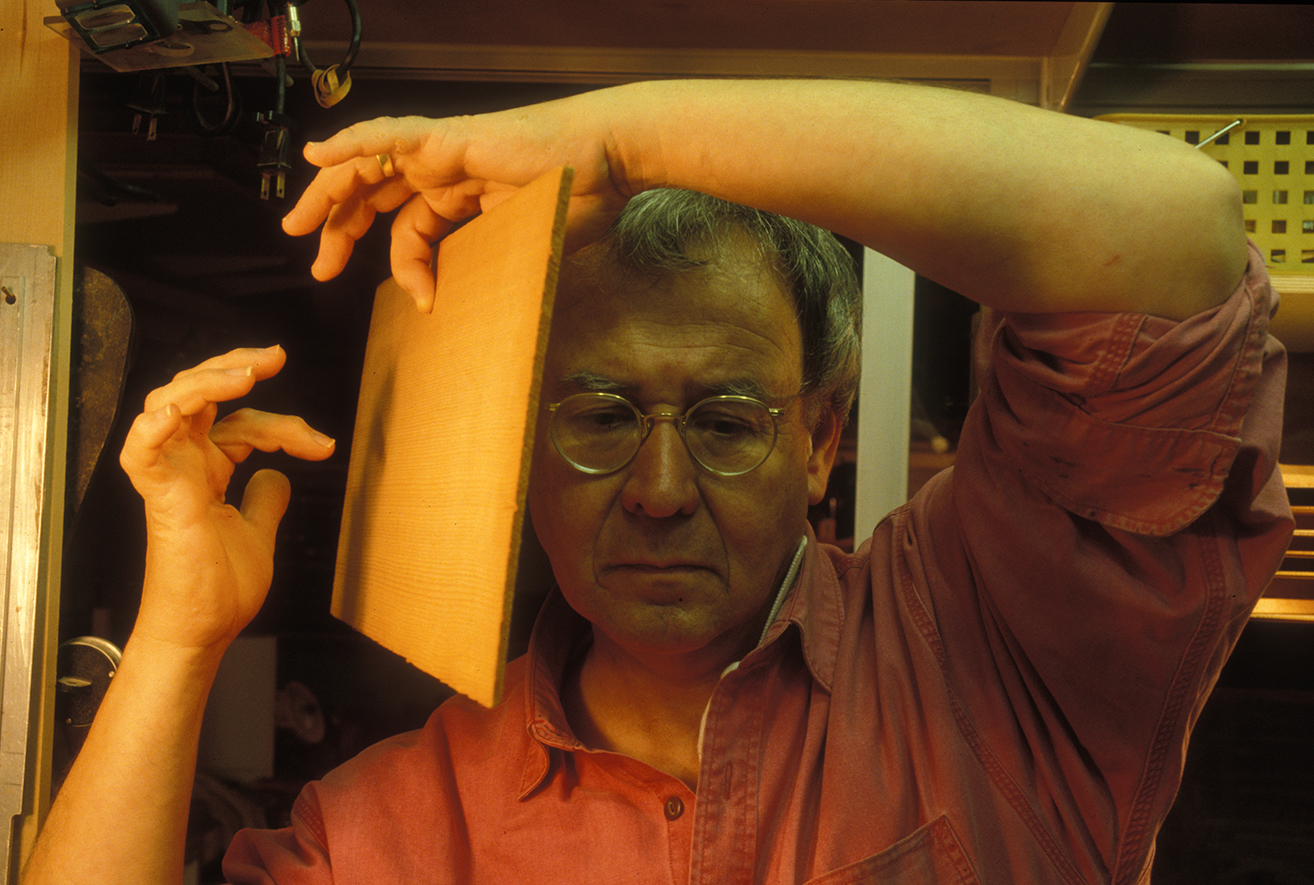
Somogyi chooses wood for his guitars according to their tone.

== Early influences and Windham Hill Records ==
In 1970, he came upon the book Classical Guitar Construction by Irving Sloane, one of the clearest guides to guitar-making, which was published in 1966. Before Sloane, wrote Barbara Stewart in The New York Times, "Anyone interested in guitar construction had to find a luthier [an expert craftsman of stringed instruments] — usually in Spain, Germany or Belgium — and try to become his apprentice."

Somogyi read Sloane's book and said he thought to himself, "I can make a guitar!" He liked guitar music (he was, and is, an accomplished player), he liked working with his hands, and he had plenty of free time. "And," he added, "there was no one to stop me." He bought tools at flea markets and labored with great deliberation, sawing, gluing, clamping, bending, filing, sanding, shaping, worrying, exulting. When the instrument was finished in 1971, he played a rousing flamenco number and started on his second guitar. He sold the first one for $200.

His first few guitars were nylon-stringed instruments for classical players. He soon found himself drawn to the construction of steel-string guitars, a descendant of the classical guitar, but used by a wide range of artists in folk and rock, and finger-picking virtuosos such as Alex De Grassi and Leo Kottke. The steel-string crowd — players and builders — was "more easy-going than the classical people. Not as uptight," Somogyi said.

Somogyi's big break came when he established a relationship with artists on the record label Windham Hill, founded in 1976 in Palo Alto, a pioneer in making high-quality recordings of solo, instrumental guitar music. Somogyi's work with Windham Hill was part of a revolution in guitar construction that is still unfolding today.

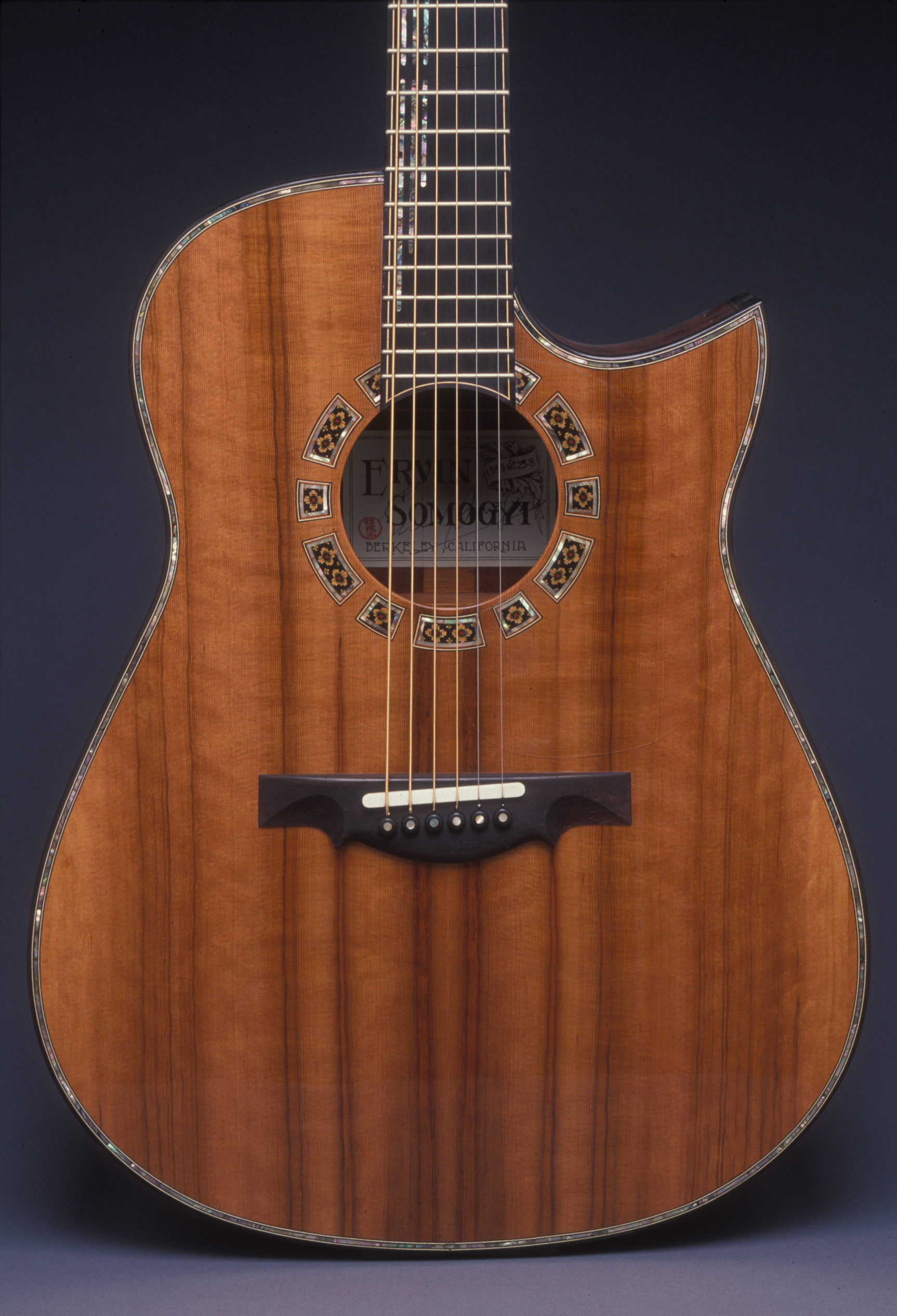
Modified Dreadnought, "Mod-D"

== Guitar models and performance ==
Somogyi makes six main models of acoustic steel string guitars: jumbo, dreadnought, "modified dreadnought" or Mod-D, OM, OOO and OO models. He can make any of these models in a 12-Fret version .

== Recordings made with Somogyi guitars ==
Somogyi guitars are frequently played and recorded with by world-class performing artists. To date some of the recording projects have been:

Shun Komatsubara, "Dear", Abend Compact Disc; "Naturally", "Scene", "Crayons", Clip Records
Masaaki Kishibe, "Secret"
Maurizio Angeletti, "Go Fly a Kite", Moondance Records
Pat Donohue, "Manhattan to Memphis", Red House Records; "Life Stories", "Back Roads", Blue Sky Records
Steve Erquiaga, "Erkiology", Windham Hill Records; "Cafe Paradiso", Imaginary Road Records
Edward Gerhard, "Night Birds", Reckless Records; "Luna" and "Christmas", Virtue Records
Mark O"Connor, "Live with Stephane Grapelli and David Grisman", "False Dawn" and "Stone From Which the Arch Was Made", Warner Bros. Records
Brother Andrew, "Flying Guitars", AMB Productions
Alex de Grassi, "Southern Exposure", "Slow Circle"; Windham Hill Records
Will Ackerman, "Past Light", Windham Hill Records
Greg Gumbel, "California Republic", Meticulous Records, Inc.
Steve Hancoff, "Steel String Guitar", "New Orleans Guitar Solos", "Duke Ellington for Solo Guitar", Out of Time . . . Music Co.
Daniel Hecht, "Willow", Windham Hill Records
Maggie Sansone, "Dulcimer and Guitar"
Alan Tower, "The Understory - Messages of Intimacy From the Thinking Earth", Geomantic Music
Michael Hedges, "Breakfast In The Field", Windham Hill Records
8th Avenue String Band, "On Stage", 8th Ave. String Band Music
The Natives, "East of the Equator", Meticulous Records, Inc.
California Guitar Trio, "Pathways", "Rocks the West", Discipline (GM);
Isato Nakagawa, "Wind From the Sun", Naniwa Records; "It’s Time For Tea", Sony Music
Peta, "Majin No Mizuumi", "Powder Snow", Sailing Ice Music

== Woodworking ==
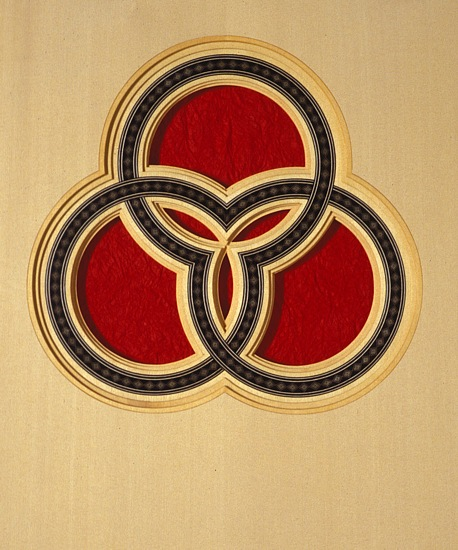
"Gothic Rings", 23" x 19"

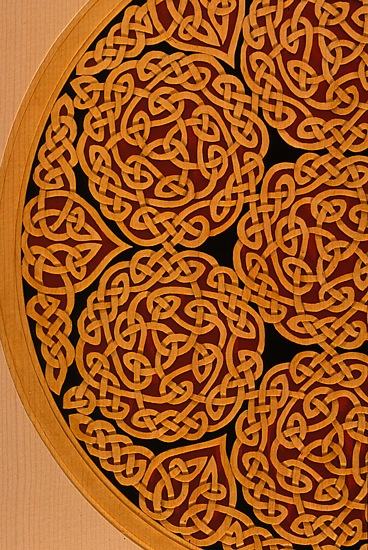
"Thread of Life", 18" x 23"

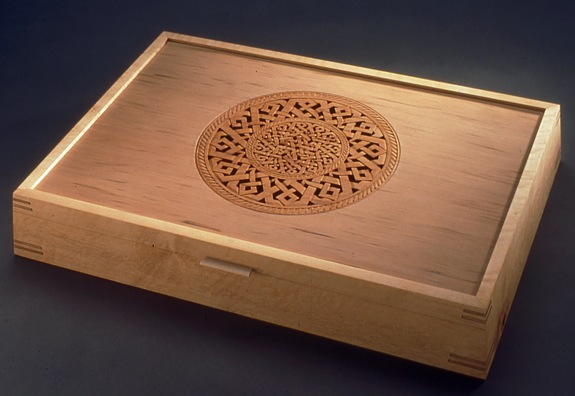
"Venere Shield Box", 12" x 18" x 3½"

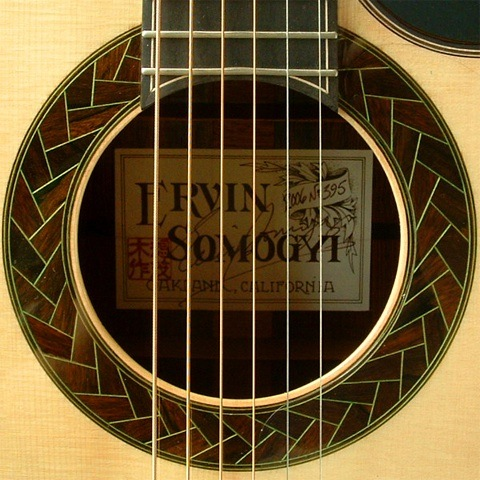
Braided Leather Rosette Guitar Inlay

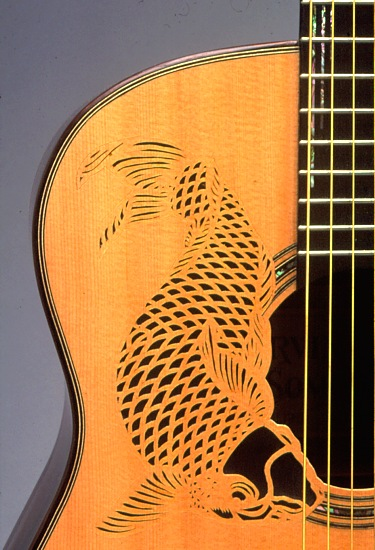
Carp Detail Guitar Inlay

Somogyi's woodworking designs arise out of stringed instrument building tradition and aesthetic. They are fashioned out of thin sheets of musical grade tone woods which have been bookmatched, edge joined, and planed thin. The mosaic inlay patterns come out of guitarmaking design: guitars have open soundholes bordered with inlaid patterns of dyed pieces of wood. These inlaid mosaic patterns are a form of fret ornamentation, an effect made by laying pieces of material of the same size next to one another and thereby producing a design. In guitars these are called rosettes. While historical rosette design originated from Arabian, Celtic and European Renaissance influences, it is expanded in Ervin Somogyi's work to also embrace Japanese, Russian, African, primitive, abstract and modern design.

== Exhibitions ==
Somogyi has participated in many guitar exhibitions, conventions, and symposia in the USA, Canada, and Japan over the last forty-plus years.

In 2006 Somogyi curated the first public exhibition of contemporary lutherie arts anywhere, for the Arts Commission of the City of Berkeley, California. The show detailed various stages of guitar and ukulele construction as practiced by working luthiers. The display was connected by a well-organized narrative signage that made otherwise dry woodworking processes intelligible and interesting to the public. An animated diorama of this special exhibit can be seen on Somogyi’s website. In 2009 Somogyi helped curate an exhibition of California guitar makers for the Oakland Museum, for display at the Oakland International Airport.
