= At War with Self =

American progressive rock band

- Also known as: Glenn Snelwar
- Origin: Indianapolis, [Indiana, US
- Genres: Progressive metal; jazz fusion; experimental; ambient
- Years active: 2004–present
- Labels: Free Electric Sound; The Laser's Edge; Sensory; Sluggo's Goon Music
- Members: Glenn Snelwar; Alex Arellano
- Past members: Michael Manring; Mark Zonder; Damon Trotta; Mark Sunshine; James Von Buelow; Dave Archer; Steve Decker; Manfred Dikkers; Marco Minnemann
- Website: Official website

At War with Self is the project conceived by multi-instrumentalist Glenn Snelwar, best known as one of the guitarists on the Gordian Knot debut album which featured members of Cynic, Watchtower, King Crimson, and Dream Theater.

== Albums ==
For the project's first album Torn Between Dimensions (2005) Glenn collaborated with drummer Mark Zonder and bassist Michael Manring. The instrumental trio created an amalgam of tight-knit compositions encompassing progressive rock, metal, jazz, ambient and classical stylings, often within the boundaries of each composition. The result was critically acclaimed and continues to grow a following as word of mouth of the project expands.

For Acts of God, the second release from the At War with Self project (2007), Snelwar has desired to create a set of compositions with the intentions of living up to the label 'progressive' by changing almost every facet of the project while staying true to the underlying inspiration of the project's inception—to combine disparate styles and create music with no boundaries. With Damon Trotta on bass, vocals, synths and programming and Snelwar on guitars, mandolin and synths, the duo is assisted by Sluggo's Goon Music labelmates Damon Trotta (bass, vocals), James Von Buelow (guitars), Steve Decker (drums), Mark Sunshine (vocals), Dave Archer (keyboards) and Manfred Dikkers (drums).

The 2009 release A Familiar Path is the third chapter of At War with Self, which is a return to Snelwar's roots as a musician that maintains the concept of the project changing for each release. The original concept in which Snelwar combined classical guitars into progressive and thrash metal has been re-visited and fully realized with A Familiar Path. The new incarnation of At War with Self features Manfred Dikkers, who joins Snelwar again from the Acts of God sessions on drums and percussion. The tracks on A Familiar Path are "the heaviest, most aggressive and accurate version of what I've had in mind for combining metal and progressive influences with classical guitars" says Snelwar. Instrumental tracks such as a hybrid half-classical, half-metal rendition of a Heitor Villa-Lobos guitar study, the Slayer-meets-King Crimson aggression of Concrete and Poison and Diseased State, a new rendering of Reflections originally featured on the debut Gordian Knot disc and the guitar shred of The Ether Trail, are balanced with the vocally-centered title track and Ourselves. A Familiar Path is accompanied with artwork that completes the emotion and intensity inspired by the 42 minutes on the disc.

Marco Minnemann plays drums in Circadian Rhythm Disorder (2015), which is actually another version of Minnemann's drum solo project entitled Normalizer 2. For the recording of the untitled fifth album, he was invited drummer Alex Arellano.

== Band members ==
- Glenn Snelwar – electric and acoustic guitars, mandolins, bass, fretless bass, e-bow, synths, keyboards, string arrangements, programming, vocals
- Alex Arellano – drums, percussion

Featuring, for Torn Between Dimensions:

- Michael Manring – fretless bass and e-bow
- Mark Zonder – drums, percussion

Featuring, for Acts Of God:

- Damon Trotta – bass guitar, vocals, synths, resonator guitars, e-bow, didgeridoo, programming
- Mark Sunshine – vocals
- James Von Buelow – guitars, programming
- Dave Archer – synths
- Steve Decker – drums
- Manfred Dikkers – drums, percussion

Featuring, for A Familiar Path:

- Manfred Dikkers – drums, percussion
- Maggie Snelwar – backing vocals

Featuring, for Circadian Rhythm Disorder:

- Marco Minnemann – drums, percussion

== Discography ==
- Torn Between Dimensions (2005)
- Acts of God (2007)
- A Familiar Path (2009)
- Circadian Rhythm Disorder (2015)
