= Terror Syndrome =

Canadian metal band

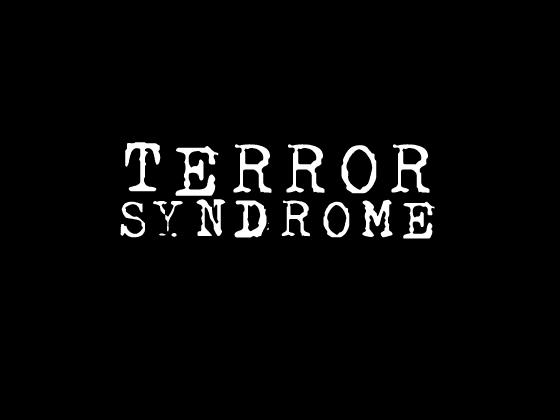

Background information
- Origin: Vancouver, Canada
- Genres: Groove metal, progressive metal
- Years active: 2006–2018
- Label: Independent
- Past members: Ryan Van Poederooyen; Dave Young; Mike Young; Dave Padden; Dave Padden

Terror Syndrome was a Canadian metal band formed by drummer Ryan Van Poederooyen in Vancouver in 2006. Initially announced as a Van Poederooyen solo project, it grew into a band consisting of Devin Townsend Band members Van Poederooyen, Mike Young, and Dave Young, alongside The Miserables vocalist Denton Bramley. The band released a self-titled album in 2008.

== History ==
Canadian drummer Ryan Van Poederooyen, known for his work in experimental metal band God Awakens Petrified and progressive metal group The Devin Townsend Band, first announced plans for a solo project in mid-2004. Over time, his idea grew from a solo project to a complete band. In late 2006, the band's name and lineup were announced. Terror Syndrome's initial lineup consisted of Van Poederooyen alongside God Awakens Petrified vocalist Denton Bramley and Devin Townsend Band members Mike Young and Dave Young.

The band's only album, Terror Syndrome, with music primarily written by Van Poederooyen, was recorded throughout 2006 and 2007, with a number of guest musicians including Michael Manring, Alex Skolnick, and Devin Townsend. It was independently released as a digital download in July 2008.

Shortly after the album's release, Bramley departed and was replaced by Annihilator vocalist Dave Padden.

Terror Syndrome played its first show at the Vancouver International Drum Festival in October 2008. The band planned a physical release of their debut album in summer 2009, followed by a series of live shows. It headlined at Vancouver's Brutal Fest in April 2009.

Due to the members' other obligations, the band met infrequently and made no public announcements after 2013. In December 2018, Terror Syndrome posted on its Facebook page that the band "is no more".

== Discography ==
- Terror Syndrome (self-released, 2008)

== Members ==
- Ryan Van Poederooyen – drums
- Dave Padden – vocals (2008–)
- Dave Young – guitar
- Mike Young – bass
- Denton Bramley – vocals (2006–2008)
