= Torched (album) =

Studio album by Michael Hedges
- Released: February 9, 1999
- Recorded: 1994–1997
- Genre: New-age, world
- Label: Windham Hill

Michael Hedges chronology
| Oracle (1996) | Torched (1999) |

Torched is the final recording guitarist Michael Hedges was working on at the time of his death, caused by a fatal car accident on December 2, 1997. It was released posthumously in 1999 on the Windham Hill label.

== Reception ==
Professional ratings
Review scores
| Source | Rating |
|---|---|
| Allmusic | 4/5 stars |

Music critic Jason Anderson, writing for Allmusic, wrote the album "In this raw format, the rock influences of Hedges' youth appear most notably in vocal phrasings that are more expressive, almost aggressive at times."

== Track listing ==
All compositions by Michael Hedges.

1. "Torched" – 4:51
2. "Spring Buds" – 4:20
3. "Fusion of the Five Elements" – 3:59
4. "Promised Land" – 3:52
5. "Phoenix Fire" – 3:40
6. "Dream Beach" – 3:51
7. "Arrowhead" – 2:17
8. "Shell Shock Venus" – 4:14
9. "Ursa Major" – 3:45
10. "Free Swinging Soul" – 4:19
11. "Rough Wind in Oklahoma" – 4:18
12. "Sapphire" – 3:48
13. "Gospel of Mary/The Holy Flame" – 5:34
14. "Java Man" – 3:44
15. "Coda: Free Swinging Soul (Live at Lincoln Center, Fort Collins, Colorado - October 16, 1994)" – 5:29

== Personnel ==
- Michael Hedges – acoustic guitars, bass, harp-guitar, synthesizers, alto flute, melodeon, percussion, and vocals
- Michael Manring – fretless bass
- David Crosby – backing vocals ("Spring Buds")
- Graham Nash – backing vocals ("Spring Buds")

== Production notes ==
- Executive producer - Hilleary Burgess
- Mastered by Bernie Grundman
