= Terror Syndrome (album) =

- The cover of the 2008 digital release of Terror Syndrome.

Studio album by Terror Syndrome
- Released: July 10, 2008
- Studios: The Armoury, Greenhouse, Begin (Vancouver, BC)
- Genres: Groove metal, progressive metal
- Length: 55:27
- Label: Terror Syndrome
- Producer: Ryan Van Poederooyen

Terror Syndrome is the only album by Canadian metal band Terror Syndrome. It was independently released in July 2008 through online distributors. A physical release, with a new track featuring the band's new vocalist Dave Padden, was originally planned for 2009.

== Background ==
Canadian drummer Ryan Van Poederooyen, known for his work in experimental metal band God Awakens Petrified and progressive metal group The Devin Townsend Band, first announced plans for a solo project in mid-2004. Over time, his idea grew from a solo project to a complete band. In late 2006, the band's name and lineup were announced. Terror Syndrome's initial lineup consisted of Van Poederooyen alongside God Awakens Petrified vocalist Denton Bramley and Devin Townsend Band members Mike Young and Dave Young.

The band's first album, with music primarily written by Van Poederooyen and lyrics by Van Poederooyen and Bramley, was recorded throughout 2006 and 2007, with a number of guest musicians including Michael Manring, Alex Skolnick, and Devin Townsend.

== Release ==
Terror Syndrome was independently released July 10, 2008 as a digital download. Shortly after the album's release, Bramley departed and was replaced by Annihilator vocalist Dave Padden. A physical release of Terror Syndrome, with a new track featuring Padden, was originally planned for 2009.

== Track listing ==
All music written by Ryan Van Poederooyen (RVP) except where noted.

	Title	Music	Lyrics	Guest musicians	Length
1.	"Stupidity for All"		Denton Bramley		4:22
2.	"Thrill Pill"		Bramley, RVP		3:55
3.	"When God Was Sober"		Bramley		4:23
4.	"For Your Amusement"		Bramley		4:10
5.	"Riot of Red"		RVP, Bramley	Christofer Malmström (guitar)	4:05
6.	"Motionless"	RVP, Jay Van Poederooyen	RVP		5:05
7.	"Revolving Horror"		Bramley, RVP		4:17
8.	"Rusty Trombone"	RVP, Dave Young		Trevor Dunn (bass), Alex Skolnick (guitar)	6:48
9.	"My Next Victim"		Bramley		3:47
10.	"One Crime Closer to Hell"		Bramley, RVP		5:28
11.	"Disposable Empire"		Bramley, RVP	Byron Stroud (bass)	3:20
12.	"Spinning Backwards"	RVP, Dave Young		Michael Manring (bass), Devin Townsend (guitar)	5:47

== Personnel ==
=== Terror Syndrome ===
- Denton Bramley – vocals
- Ryan Van Poederooyen – drums
- Dave Young – guitar
- Mike Young – bass

=== Guest musicians ===
- Trevor Dunn – bass (track 8)
- Christofer Malmström – guitar (track 5)
- Michael Manring – bass (track 12)
- Alex Skolnick – guitar (track 8)
- Byron Stroud – bass (track 11)
- Devin Townsend – guitar (track 12)

=== Production ===
- Ryan Van Poederooyen – production
- Shaun Thingvold – engineering, editing
- Dave Young – engineering
- Mike Young – engineering, editing
- Devin Townsend – engineering, mixing
- Greg Reely – mastering
- Rob Stefanson – engineering assistance
- Bryan Coisne – engineering assistance
- Jay Van Poederooyen – editing

=== Design ===
- Jos Van Poederooyen – photography
