= The Baltimore Consort =

US musical ensemble

- Genres: Early, Renaissance, Classical and Folk
- Years active: 1980–present
- Label: Dorian/Sono Luminus
- Members: José Lemos (countertenor), Danielle Svonavec (soprano), Ronn McFarlane (lute), Mary Anne Ballard (viols, fiddle), Larry Lipkis (bass viol, recorder, crumhorn), Mindy Rosenfeld (flutes, fifes, crumhorn), and Mark Cudek (cittern, recorder, crumhorn, viol)

The Baltimore Consort is a musical ensemble that performs a wide variety of early music, Renaissance music and music from later periods. They began in 1980 as a group specializing in music of the Elizabethan period, but soon expanded their repertoire to include Scottish music, broadside ballads, and Italian, French, and other European music of the 16th and 17th centuries. Their music bridges the genres of classical and folk music.

== History ==
The Baltimore Consort was founded by Roger Harmon and Mindy Rosenfeld in 1980. Harmon formerly had taught lute at the Peabody Conservatory in Baltimore, Maryland. They performed together for ten years before releasing their first album for Dorian Recordings, a collection of Scottish music called On the Banks of Helicon. By the time of that recording the ensemble consisted of Custer LaRue (soprano), Ronn McFarlane (lute), Mary Anne Ballard (viols, fiddle), Larry Lipkis (bass viol, recorder), Chris Norman (flutes, bagpipes, bodhran), Howard Bass (bandora), and Mark Cudek (cittern, bass viol). Norman was replaced in 2003 by Mindy Rosenfeld, founding member of the original 1980 group whom he had replaced in 1987, and LaRue began an indefinite leave of absence in 2004, at which time countertenor José Lemos began performing with the group, joined in 2005 by soprano Danielle Svonavec.

The group has recorded some 15 albums for Dorian, including a Christmas album, Bright Day Star, and a collection of bawdy songs with the a capella quartet called the Merry Companions, The Art of the Bawdy Song and a 2007 instrumental compilation, Gut, Wind and Wire. Their various recordings also cover a number of the Child ballads.

== Discography ==
- On The Banks of Helicon (1990)
- Watkins Ale (1990)
- The Art of the Bawdy Song (1992)
- La Rocque 'n' Roll (1993)
- Custer LaRue Sings 'The Daemon Lover' with The Baltimore Consort (1993)
- Bright Day Star (1994)
- A Trip to Killburn (1996)
- Tunes from the Attic (1997)
- The Ladyes Delight (1998)
- The Mad Buckgoat (1999)
- Shakespeare's Music (2001)
- Amazing Grace (2001)
- Adew Dundee (2003)
- The Best of the Baltimore Consort (2003)
- Gut, Wind and Wire; Instruments of the Baltimore Consort (2007)
- The Baltimore Consort Live in Concert (2008)
- Adio Espana: Romances, Villancicos, and Improvisations from Spain, circa 1550 (2009)
- The Food of Love: Songs, Dances, and Fancies for Shakespeare (2019)
