= Gordian Knot (album) =

Studio album by Gordian Knot
- Released: March 5, 1999
- Genre: Jazz fusion, progressive rock
- Length: 58:13
- Label: Sensor
- Producer: Trey Gunn and Sean Malone

Gordian Knot chronology
Gordian Knot (1999)	Emergent (2003)

Professional ratings
Review scores
Source	Rating
Allmusic	4/5 stars
Sputnikmusic	4/5 stars

Gordian Knot is the debut album of Sean Malone's progressive rock project of the same name.

The cover of the album features an image from a bubble chamber – an early particle detector.

The song "Reflections" was first demoed by guitarist Glenn Snelwar in 1994 for his solo project, At War With Self, and also appears on the band's third album, A Familiar Path, released in 2009.

== Track listing ==
1. "Galois" ( – 2:05, Malone) - Malone
2. "Code/Anticode" ( – 6:44, Malone) - Malone, Reinert, Gunn, Jarzombek
3. "Reflections" ( – 6:49, Snelwar, Malone, Reinert) - Malone, Reinert, Snelwar
4. "Megrez" ( – 4:00, Gunn, Malone) - Gunn
5. "Singularity" ( – 4:43, Malone, Snelwar, Reinert) - Reinert, Malone, Snelwar, Jarzombek, Gunn
6. "Redemption's Way" ( – 6:58, Malone) - Malone, Myung, Snelwar, Gunn
7. "Komm süsser Tod, komm sel'ge" ( – 2:24, J.S. Bach, arr. Malone) - Malone
8. "Rivers Dancing" ( – 7:35, Malone, Snelwar, Reinert) - Reinert, Snelwar, Malone, Jarzombek, Gunn
9. "Srikara Tal" ( – 9:18, Malone) - Malone, Myung, Gunn
10. "Grace" ( – 7:34, Malone) - Malone
11. "Unquity Road***" – 5:28 (Japanese Exclusive Bonus Track)

== Personnel ==
- Sean Malone (Cynic, Aghora, Anomaly) - Fretless bass (all), Chapman stick (2,3,5,6,7,9), keyboards (1,2,5)
- John Myung (Dream Theater, Platypus, The Jelly Jam) - Chapman stick (6,9)
- Trey Gunn (King Crimson, KTU) - Warr guitar (2,4,5,6,8,9)
- Glenn Snelwar (At War With Self) - guitars (3,5,6,8)
- Ron Jarzombek (Spastic Ink, Blotted Science, Watchtower) - guitars (2,5,8)
- Adam Levy (Norah Jones) - guitars
- Sean Reinert (Cynic, Death, Aghora) - drums (2,3,5,8,9)
