= Watching My Life Go By =

Studio album by Michael Hedges
- Released: 1985
- Recorded: May–June 1985, Naked Ear Studio, Palo Alto, CA
- Genre: New-age, world
- Length: 40:23
- Label: Windham Hill
- Producer: Elliot Mazer

Michael Hedges chronology
Aerial Boundaries (1984)	Watching My Life Go By (1985)	Live on the Double Planet (1987)

Watching My Life Go By is the third studio album by Michael Hedges released in 1985. After two solo instrumental albums, Hedges sang on all the tracks on this release.

== Reception ==
Professional ratings
Review scores
Source	Rating
Allmusic	4/5 stars

Music critic Jason Anderson, writing for AllMusic, wrote of the album "Subdued, almost uncharacteristically restrained, Hedges the singer/songwriter doesn't quite live up to Hedges the avant-garde or self-proclaimed "violent acoustic" guitarist... A bit of a learning experience, Watching My Life Go By might not be Hedges' finest offering; however, the record still features plenty of great performances of heartfelt material."

== Track listing ==
All compositions by Michael Hedges except "All Along the Watchtower" by Bob Dylan.

1. "Face Yourself" – 4:43
2. "I'm Coming Home" – 4:14
3. "Woman of the World" – 4:17
4. "Watching My Life Go By" – 3:16
5. "I Want You" – 4:00
6. "The Streamlined Man" – 3:46
7. "Out on the Parkway" – 2:58
8. "Holiday" – 5:14
9. "All Along the Watchtower" (Bob Dylan) – 3:01
10. "Running Blind" – 4:54

"Holiday" ends with Hedges singing the first verse of "My Country, 'Tis of Thee", which is not credited in the liner notes.

== Personnel ==
- Michael Hedges – guitar, vocals, bass ("I'm Coming Home", "Running Blind"), flute ("Woman of the World"), synthesizer ("I Want You", "Holiday"), harmonica ("Holiday"), wine glasses ("Out on the Parkway")
- Michael Manring – fretless bass ("Face Yourself", "I Want You", "Out on the Parkway")
- John Hanes – drums ("I Want You")
- Bobby McFerrin – chant and solo vocals ("The Streamlined Man")
- Hilleary Burgess – wine glasses ("Out on the Parkway"), production coordination
- Elliot Mazer - engineer
- Bryan Lanser, Marty Atkinson, Wes Weaver, Neil Janklow - assistant engineers
- Anne Robinson - album design
- Irene Young - cover portrait
- Carol Erlich - photo tinting
- Ruth Carroll Hedges - liner photo

== Production notes ==
- Produced by Elliot Mazer
- Engineered by Elliot Mazer, Michael Hedges
- Mastered by George Horn
- Design by Anne Robinson
- Photography by Irene Young
