= Taproot (album) =

Studio album by Michael Hedges
- Released: 1990
- Studio: Speech & Hearing Clinic, Mendocino, CA
- Genre: New-age, world
- Length: 40:27
- Label: Windham Hill
- Producer: Michael Hedges

Michael Hedges chronology
Live on the Double Planet (1987)	Taproot (1990)	The Road to Return (1994)

Taproot is a recording by guitarist Michael Hedges released on the Windham Hill label. It was a Grammy nominee for Best New Age Album.

== Reception ==
Professional ratings
Review scores
Source	Rating
Allmusic	4/5 stars

Music critic Vincent Jeffries, writing for Allmusic, wrote of the album "The music is touching in its purity and conveyance of honor and affection... With its yearning melodies and expressive yet mature emotional language, Taproot reinforces Hedges' reputation as a gifted, self-realized composer, musician, and human being."

== Reissue ==
The album was reissued in 2011 by Valley Entertainment.

== Track listing ==
All compositions by Michael Hedges except where noted.

- "Song of the Spirit Farmer" arranged by E. J. Ulrich.
- Lyrics to "i carry your heart" by E. E. Cummings.
1. "The Naked Stalk" – 1:43
2. "The Jealous Tunnel/About Face" – 4:20
3. "The Jade Stalk" – 3:55
4. "Nomad Land" – 1:54
5. "Point A" – 1:33
6. "Chava's Song" – 3:14
7. "Ritual Dance" – 2:17
8. "Scenes (on the road to shrub 2)" – 4:23
9. "The First Cutting" – 3:02
10. "Point B" – 1:57
11. "Song of the Spirit Farmer" – 4:45
12. "The Rootwitch" – 2:29
13. "i carry your heart" (Hedges, E. E. Cummings) – 4:55

== Personnel ==
- Michael Hedges – guitar, vocals, bass, flute, tin whistle, synthesizers, TransTrem guitar, harp guitar, savage myth guitar, piano, drums, drum program, percussion, sound effects
- Michael Manring – fretless bass ("i carry your heart")
- David Crosby – harmony vocals ("i carry your heart")
- Graham Nash – harmony vocals ("i carry your heart")
- Bryan Lanser – snare drum, bass drum, cymbals ("The Jealous Tunnel/About Face", "The First Cutting")
- Mike Moore – clarinet, bass clarinet, saxophone ("The Jade Stalk", "Nomad Land", "Scenes (on the road to Shrub 2)")
- Mindy Rosenfeld – unspecified
- Produced by Michael Hedges
- Mastered by Bernie Grundman
