= Michael Manring =

American musician (born 1960)

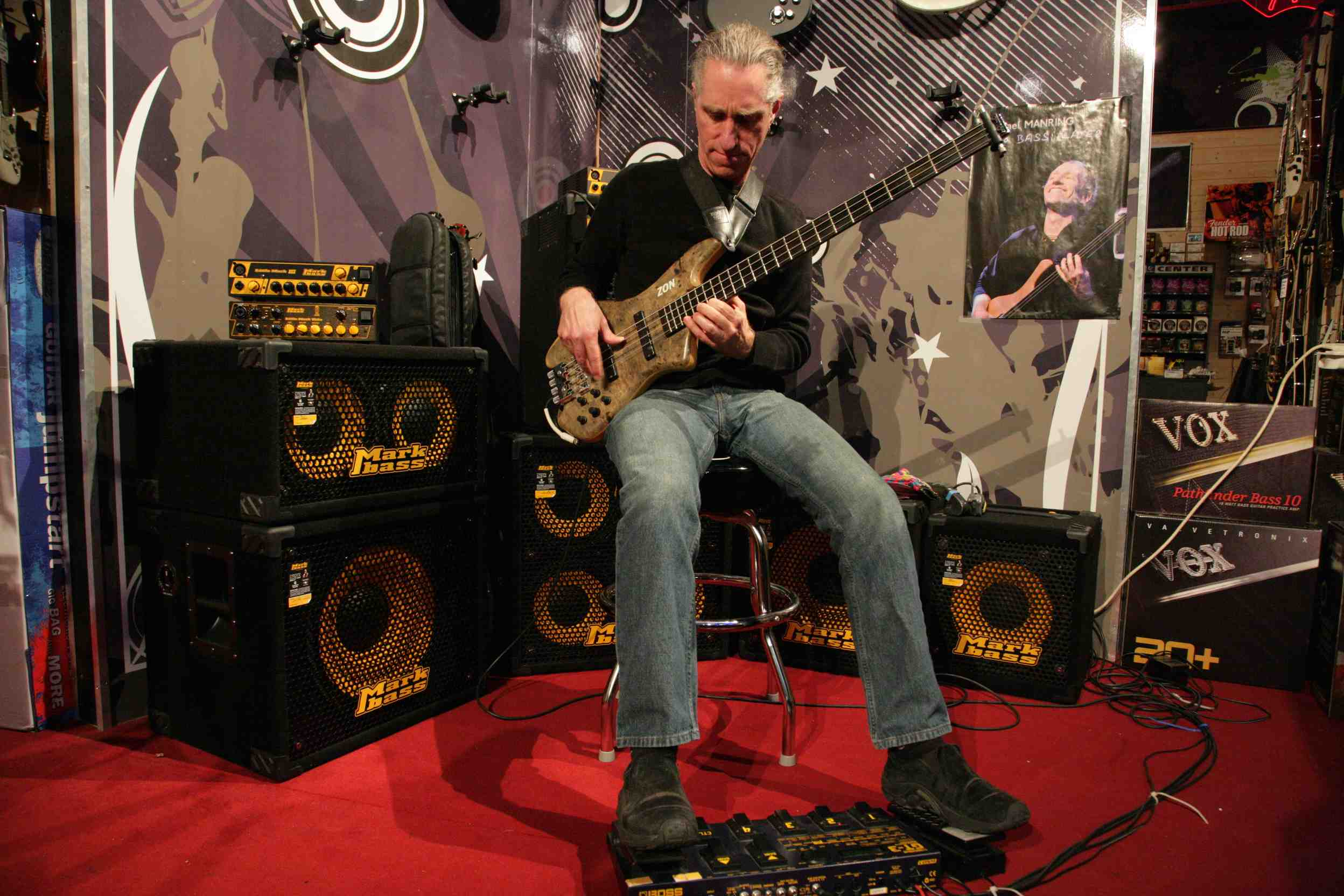
- Michael Manring playing his bass guitar

Background information
- Born: June 27, 1960 (age 65); Annapolis, Maryland, U.S.
- Origin: Washington, D.C., United States
- Genres: Jazz fusion, world music, new-age, experimental, ambient
- Occupation: Musician
- Instruments: Bass guitar, keyboards
- Years active: 1975–present
- Labels: Windham Hill, High Street, Alchemy, Manthing
- Formerly of: Attention Deficit
- Website: www.manthing.com

Michael Manring (born June 27, 1960) is an American bass guitarist from the San Francisco Bay Area.

== Biography ==
Michael Manring was born in Annapolis, Maryland, as the youngest of four children. His family lived in Norfolk, Virginia and moved to the suburbs of Washington, D.C. in 1969. The Manrings were a very active family musically, providing a very fertile background for Michael's musical development. He and his brother Doug—a guitarist and drummer, later living a long time in Japan—formed a very active rhythm group while in high school, venturing through jazz rock and fusion, playing rock classics at beer parties or pop standards in restaurants and at weddings.

Manring was a pupil of bassist Peter Princiotto from Spring Hill area, Virginia. He began to study at Berklee College of Music in Boston, Massachusetts in the late 1970s, but canceled his studies in 1979 because of the heavy workload he already had, touring with several different bands like the prog rock band However. During his time at Berklee College he used every opportunity to play with very different musicians and bands. In the 1980s he studied and toured with Jaco Pastorius and began to develop his own style.

In addition to a long tenure in the 1980s as house bassist for Windham Hill Records, Manring has recorded with Spastic Ink, Alex Skolnick (in the bands Skol-Patrol and Attention Deficit, also featuring Tim Alexander from Primus), Larry Kassin, Tom Darter, Steve Morse, David Cullen, Alex de Grassi, Will Ackerman and many other noted musicians. He headlined his own band, Montreux, throughout the 1980s. He has been a member of Yo Miles!, Henry Kaiser and Wadada Leo Smith's Miles Davis tribute band, since its inception. In 1994 Manring was polled Bassist of the Year by the readers of Bass Player magazine. Manring's name is also tied with that of fingerstyle guitarist Michael Hedges, who was a dear friend and fellow musician. Manring toured extensively with Hedges and played on all Hedges albums except one. Manring is known as a humble and gracious live performer with a gift for improvisation with guest musicians.

Since 2005 Manring is a member of the band DeMania with guitarist Alex de Grassi and percussionist Christopher Garcia. In 2019, Manring and Garcia joined Motoshi Kosako on harp to form the band KoMaGa Trio. In 2020 Manring collaborated with the Art of Peace global project, composed and arranged by Mehran Alirezaei. Manring remains active, touring the world for performances and clinics with various artists. He lives in Oakland, California.

== Music and musical influences ==
Because of his association with the Windham Hill label Manring often was seen as a New Age musician. He doesn't see himself as belonging to a certain style or genre and often jokes about categorizing his music. His album Thonk he termed for example "... the first new Age–death metal–fusion–album".

Manring has a solid musical knowledge and uses the bass as a solo instrument usually in alternate tunings, with additional possibilities and patterns invoked on the fly with lever-activated de-tuners and bridges, somewhat like a pedal steel guitar. He wants to show that the electric bass can be used in a musically rich and expressive way. Manring occasionally plays on two (or even three or four) basses at the same time during live performances. Manring is also a composer of experimental music, mixing technology and fretless bass with the sounds of kitchen implements and cardboard boxes, evidenced on his "Book of Flame" solo album.

He is a technical virtuoso, generally using his bass in very different ways. Mostly he plays a fretless bass, which gives him ample possibilities to change tone and pitch just like on a double bass. Manring is rhythmically very versatile and often uses polyrhythms. He's said to do "... things on the electric bass that haven't been done before, are nearly impossible, and (are) illegal in most states.". A unique technique employed by Manring is utilizing Hipshot D tuners to change the tuning of one or more strings over the course of playing a piece.

== Equipment ==
Manring plays a custom bass by Zon Guitars, called the Hyperbass, a very flexible instrument, which was developed by Joseph Zon and Manring. Special tuning pegs and a special bridge allow instantaneous tuning change of single strings as well as of all strings simultaneously by the action of several tiny levers, a system like that of the TransTrem guitar. The development of this special model was caused by Manring's use of open tunings. When Manring began changing tunings during pieces by turning the pegs while playing, he soon realized the limitations of this approach. First he tried to overcome these limitations by changing a normal Music Man Sting Ray Bass, but then began to develop the Hyperbass with Zon. The Hyperbass has Bartolini pickups for every string and four Fishman transducers for the body signals of the instruments.

Apart from the Hyperbass, Manring uses a whole fleet of instruments. A listing at his website gives the following models:

- Zon Legacy Elite Special fretless, aka "Bub"
- Homemade Jazz Bass–style fretless
- Zon Michael Manring Hyperbass
- Zon Custom Fretless, aka "Junior" or "Son of Bub"
- Larrivee 5-string fretless acoustic bass guitar
- MusicMan Stingray fretless
- Paroutaud Music Laboratories 5-string fretless Infinite Sustain prototype
- PRS fretless
- Riverhead Unicorn fretless
- Riverhead Unicorn fretted bass
- Zon prototype headless fretted bass, aka "Vinny"
- Zon Legacy Elite 6-string fretless
- Zon prototype Legacy 10-string bass (5 x 2).

Manring uses Markbass amplifiers and EBow/PlusBow.

== Discography ==
=== As leader ===
- 1986 Unusual Weather (Windham Hill)
- 1989 Toward the Center of the Night (Windham Hill)
- 1991 Drastic Measures (Windham Hill)
- 1994 Thonk (High Street)
- 1995 Up Close 21 (Windham Hill/High Street/Boston Acoustic)
- 1998 The Book of Flame (Alchemy)
- 2005 Soliloquy (Manthing)
- 2020 Small Moments (Manthing)

=== As guest ===
With Michael Hedges

- 1981 Breakfast in the Field (Windham Hill)
- 1984 Aerial Boundaries (Windham Hill)
- 1986 Watching My Life Go By (Open Air)
- 1987 Live on the Double Planet (Windham Hill)
- 1990 Taproot (Windham Hill)
- 1996 Oracle (Windham Hill)
- 1999 Torched (Windham Hill)
- 2001 Beyond Boundaries – Guitar Solos (Windham Hill)

With Montreux (On Chiaroscuro as 'Mike Marshall & Darol Anger')

- 1985 Chiaroscuro (Windham Hill)
- 1987 Sign Language (Windham Hill)
- 1989 Let Them Say (Windham Hill)

With John Gorka

- 1991 Jack's Crows (High Street)
- 1992 Temporary Road (High Street)
- 1994 Out of the Valley (High Street)
- 1996 Between Five and Seven (High Street)
- 1998 After Yesterday (Red House)
- 2001 Company You Keep (Red House)
- 2006 Writing in the Margins (Red House)

With others

- 1995 Turtle Island Quartet, By the Fireside (Windham Hill)
- 1997 Alex Skolnick, The Skol-Patrol (Pluto-Bound)
- 1998, 2001 Alex Skolnick, Tim Alexander, Attention Deficit (Magna Carta Records)
- 1999 Jim Matheos, Away with Words
- 2001 David Cullen. Equilibré (Solid Air)
- 2005 At War With Self, Torn Between Dimensions (Free Electric Sound)
- 2006 Jonni Lightfoot, BLU (DreamAttik Productions)
- 2007 Jeff Titus, Wood Dragon
- 2008 Jeff Loomis, Zero Order Phase (Century Media)
- 2008 Justin King, I-XII
- 2008 Terror Syndrome, Terror Syndrome
- 2011 Lukas Ligeti, Pattern Time (Innova)
- 2013 Gianfranco Continenza, Dusting the Time (Videoradio)
- 2013 Kevin Kastning, In Winter (Greydisc)
- 2016 Calum Graham, Farewell (Studio AD/TL Studios)
- 2019 Gianfranco Continenza, Vertical Horizons (Never Sleeping)
- 2020 KoMaGa Trio with Motoshi Kosako (harp) and Christoper Garica (tabla, percussion), Foxing Hour (KoMaGa Trio)

Other labels

- 1994 We Sing to Open Ears (High Street)
- 1996 Different Mozart (Philips)
- 1997 Heritage (Polygram )
- 1997 A Very Green Christmas (Seventh Wave)
- 1999 Moonlight Moments (Columbia River)
- 1999 Soundscape – New Age Reflections (Delta/BMG)
- 1999 Bass Talk, Vol. 6 (Hot Wire)
- 1999 Bass Day '98 (Hudson Music)
- 2000 Dreamscape (Delta)
- 2003 Guitar Harvest I (Solid Air)
- 2004 Healing Garden – The Art of Relaxation (Madacy)
- 2005 Brazil Duets (Adventure Music)
- 2006 Woodsongs: An Acoustic Guitar Collection (New Land Music)
- 2010 The Quantum Activist Soundtrack (Bluedot Productions)

=== Video ===
- 1996 Bass Essentials (Hot Licks)
- 1998 The Artist’s Profile: Michael Manring (Ecliptic productions)
- 1998 Bass Day '98 (Hudson Music)
- 2000 Michael Manring: Instructional Bass (Video, Hal Leonard)
- 2008 Michael Manring: Resonances (DVD, Resonance Prod LLC/Michael Manring)
- 2009 The Quantum Activist Documentary Soundtrack (Bluedot Productions)
