= Ronn McFarlane =

American lutenist and composer

Ronn McFarlane (born 1953) is an American lutenist and composer, most notable as an interpreter of Renaissance music. He formerly taught lute at the Peabody Conservatory, and has recorded many albums as a solo performer and in collaboration with others, including the groups Ayreheart and The Baltimore Consort, and as a guest artist for countless other groups. He resides in West Linn, Oregon (a suburb of Portland), and continues to perform and compose to this day.

== Life and career ==
Ronn McFarlane was born in West Virginia and grew up in Maryland. He began playing guitar as a teenager and went on to play blues and rock music in popular music bands. He studied classical guitar at Shenandoah Conservatory and continued his studies at Peabody Conservatory with Paul O'Dette, Roger Harmon, and Pat O'Brien. In 1978, he began to concentrate on lute, and in 1979 became a founding member of the Baltimore Consort. He began a touring career in the United States, Canada and Europe, both with the Baltimore Consort and as a soloist.

From 1984-1995, he was a faculty member of the Peabody Conservatory teaching lute. In 1996, he received an honorary Doctorate of Music from Shenandoah Conservatory for his achievements as a musician and recording artist. McFarlane began composing music for the lute and working with a new ensemble called Ayreheart. He has also published collections of lute music, including Scottish Lute in 1998 and Highland King: The Scottish Lute in 2003.

== Discography ==
McFarlane made over 25 recordings for the Dorian Recordings label, including solo albums, lute performances, recordings with the Baltimore Consort and other selections. His solo CD Indigo Road, which featured original compositions, received a Grammy Award Nomination for Best Classical Crossover Album in 2009.

=== Solo ===
- The Art of Vivaldi's Lute, 2011
- One Morning, 2009
- Indigo Road, 2007
- The Art of the Lute, 2003
- Highland King, 1999
- A Distant Shore, 1997
- Between Two Hearts, 1996
- The Renaissance Lute, 1994
- The Lute Music of John Dowland, 1991
- The Scottish Lute, 1990

=== Collaborations ===
- Fermi's Paradox, with Carloyn Surrick, 2020
- Nine Notes that Shook the World with Mindy Rosenfeld, 2013
- Two Lutes with William Simms, 2012
- Blame Not My Lute with Robert Aubry Davis, 2010
- The Italian Lute Song with Julianne Baird, 1996
- The English Lute Song with Julianne Baird, 1993
- O Mistress Mine with Frederick Urrey, 1986
- Greensleeves with Julianne Baird, 1985

=== With Ayreheart ===
- Barley Moon, 2016

=== With The Baltimore Consort ===
- Adio Espana: Romances Sonatas & Improvisations, 2009
- Bright Day Star, 2009
- Live in Concert (live recording), 2008
- Gut, Wind and Wire, 2007
- Adew Dundee, 2003
- Best of the Baltimore Consort (compilation), 2003
- Amazing Grace also with Custer LaRue, 2001
- The Mad Buckgoat, 1999
- The Ladyes Delight, 1998
- Tunes from the Attic, 1997
- A Trip to Killburn, 1996
- A Baltimore Consort Collection, 1996
- The True Lover's Farewell also with Custer LaRue, 1995
- La Rocque 'N' Roll, 1993
- Custer LaRue Sing the Daemon Lover also with Custer LaRue, 1993
- The Art of the Bawdy Song, 1993
- Watkins Ale, 1992
- On the Banks of Helicon, 1990

== Works ==
Selected compositions include:

=== Chamber works ===
- Sycamore, for lute, flute and bass
- Indigo Road, for lute
- Cathedral Cave, for lute, flute, bass and percussion
- Denali, for lute
- Overland, for lute, harp, string quartet, bass and percussion
- Pinetops, for lute, cittern and bass
- Blue Norther, for lute
- Chocolate Factory, for lute and percussion
- Rosa, for lute, harmonium, bass and percussion
- Uncharted Waters, for lute and bass
- Dowland's Goodnight, for lute
- Early Christmas Morning, for lute
- Gigue, for lute
- Thistleheart, for lute, flute and bass
- Over the Green Earth, for lute
- Augusta, for lute, harp, bass and percussion
- A Day in November, for lute and ensemble
- Bad Hair Day, for lute, sounds and ensemble
- Dakota Days, for lute
- Before the Wind, for lute and ensemble
- Man of Arms, for lute
- On the Heath, for two lutes
- Lullaby for Anne, for lute
- One Morning, for lute and percussion

=== Vocal works ===
- Borderland, song
- Snapdragon, song
- Wolf Summit, song
- Union Bridge, song

=== Choral works ===
- Nocturne, for chorus and lute
- Sings in Her Sleep, song
