= Acts of God (At War with Self album) =

Studio album by At War With Self
- Released: April 2007
- Genre: Progressive metal
- Length: 56:05
- Label: Sluggo's Goon Music

At War With Self chronology
Torn Between Dimensions (2005)	Acts of God (2007)	A Familiar Path (2009)

Acts of God is the second studio album by the Indianapolis-based progressive metal band At War With Self.

== Track listing ==
1. "Acts Of God" (Glenn Snelwar) – 3:37
2. "911" (Snelwar, Damon Trotta) – 5:03
3. "Threads" (Snelwar, Trotta) – 6:02
4. "Ursa Minor" (Snelwar, Trotta, James vonBuelow) – 6:48
5. "End In Blue" (Snelwar, Trotta) – 7:24
6. "Martyr" (Snelwar, Trotta) – 6:35
7. "No Place" (Snelwar, Trotta) – 7:44
8. "Choke Loud" (Snelwar, Trotta, VonBuelow) – 4:19
9. "Refugee" (Snelwar, Mark Sunshine, Trotta) – 8:34

== Personnel ==
=== Band members ===
- Glenn Snelwar - electric and acoustic guitars, mandolins, keyboards, e-bow, string arrangements, programming

=== Guest musicians ===
- Damon Trotta - bass guitar, vocals, synths, resonator guitars, e-bow, didgeridoo, programming
- Mark Sunshine - vocals
- Dave Archer - synths
- James Von Buelow - guitars, programming
- Steve Decker - drums
- Manfred Dikkers - drums, percussion
