= Live on the Double Planet =

Live album by Michael Hedges
- Released: 1987
- Recorded: July 1986–May 1987
- Genre: New-age, world
- Length: 43:56
- Label: Windham Hill
- Producer: Michael Hedges

Michael Hedges chronology
Watching My Life Go By (1985)	Live on the Double Planet (1987)	Taproot (1990)

Live on the Double Planet is a live recording by guitarist Michael Hedges released on the Windham Hill label.

== Reception ==
Professional ratings
Review scores
Source	Rating
Allmusic	3/5 stars

Music critic Jason Anderson, writing for Allmusic, wrote of the album "Throughout this wide-ranging effort, Hedges' incredible right hand keeps perfect time in its role as sole accompaniment for the musician's vocal work and simultaneous soloing... Too passionate to simply file under new age, Hedges displays all his originality and fiery musicianship on this first-rate live offering."

== Track listing ==
All compositions by Michael Hedges except as noted.

1. "All Along the Watchtower" (Bob Dylan) – 2:59
2. "Because It's There" – 3:13
3. "Silent Anticipations" – 3:01
4. "Ready or Not" – 3:52
5. "A Love Bizarre" (Prince, Sheila E.) – 4:30
6. "Breakfast in the Field" – 2:17
7. "Rikki's Shuffle" – 3:09
8. "Woman of the World" – 4:28
9. "The Double Planet" – 3:23
10. "The Funky Avocado" – 3:20
11. "Come Together" (John Lennon, Paul McCartney) – 5:10
12. "Two Days Old" – 4:34

"The Funky Avocado" features a brief interpolation of The Rolling Stones' "Miss You". Hedges alludes to this in the introduction of the song, by telling the audience that it will feature a brief "disco" section.

== Personnel and production ==
- Michael Hedges – guitar, vocals, harp guitar, production
- Michael Manring – fretless bass ("Rikki's Shuffle")
- Harry Andronis, David Bianco, Hilleary Burgess - sound engineers
- Bernie Grundman - master
