= The Road to Return =

1994 studio album by Michael Hedges

Studio album by Michael Hedges
- Released: 1994
- Recorded: Speech & Hearing Clinic, Mendocino, CA
- Genre: New-age, world
- Length: 40:57
- Label: Windham Hill
- Producer: Michael Hedges

Michael Hedges chronology
| Taproot (1990) | The Road to Return (1994) | Oracle (1996) |

The Road to Return is a recording by guitarist Michael Hedges released on the Windham Hill label. It features eight vocal arrangements and two instrumentals.

== Reception ==
Professional ratings
Review scores
| Source | Rating |
|---|---|
| Allmusic | 4/5 stars |

Music critic Jason Anderson, writing for Allmusic, wrote the album "Fans of the musician's stunning two-handed, alternate-tuned guitar innovations were a little disappointed by the relatively minimal Road to Return, with its accent on Hedges' newfound vocal stylings."

== Track listing ==
All compositions by Michael Hedges except as noted.

1. "Prelude" – 3:05
2. "Road to Return" – 6:03
3. "Communicate" – 4:09
4. "Sister Soul" – 4:34
5. "Guardian's Trust" (Hedges, Cate McNider) – 3:48
6. "India" – 3:55
7. "A Midwinter Night's Dream" – 5:36
8. "Follow Through" – 3:43
9. "You Can Have Anything You Want" – 3:49
10. "Road Music" – 2:15

== Personnel ==
- Michael Hedges – guitar, vocals, bass, keyboards, drums, alto flute, harmonica
- Pipa Pinon – chant vocals
- Janeen Rae Heller – saw

== Production notes ==
- Produced and engineered by Michael Hedges
- Mastered by Bernie Grundman
