= Oracle (Michael Hedges album) =

Studio album by Michael Hedges
- Released: October 1, 1996
- Recorded: Speech & Hearing Clinic, Mendocino, California
- Genre: New-age, world
- Length: 40:20
- Label: Windham Hill
- Producer: Michael Hedges

Michael Hedges chronology
The Road to Return (1994)	Oracle (1996)	Torched (1999)

Oracle is a recording by guitarist Michael Hedges released on the Windham Hill label. It won the 1998 Grammy Award for Best New Age Album. Oracle peaked at number seven on the Billboard New Age Albums chart.

The album was reissued in 2009 by Valley Entertainment.

== Reception ==
Professional ratings
Review scores
Source	Rating
AllMusic	3/5 stars

Music critic Jason Anderson, writing for AllMusic, wrote "On an album that is mostly instrumental and generally concerned more with melody than thematic cohesion and quirky technical breakthroughs, Hedges relies on his past offerings and simplest musical instincts for inspiration, and the results are splendid... this offering is consistent in its quality, and rare in its musical commitment."

== Track listing ==
- All compositions by Michael Hedges except as noted.
- "Greensleeves" was not listed in the liner notes. It was originally recorded for The Windham Hill sampler Carols of Christmas.
1. "The 2nd Law" – 3:07
2. "Ignition" – 3:28
3. "Baal T'shuvah" – 2:10
4. "Dirge" – 3:29
5. "Jitterboogie" – 2:37
6. "Oracle" – 4:08
7. "Gospel" – 2:22
8. "Tomorrow Never Knows" (Lennon–McCartney) – 4:01
9. "Theme from Hatari!" (Henry Mancini) – 3:19
10. "Aura Müünta" – 2:58
11. "Jitterboogie (Family version)" – 2:09
12. "Sofa No. 1" (Frank Zappa) – 2:42
13. "When I Was 4" – 4:19
14. "Greensleeves" (Traditional) – 3:08

== Personnel ==
- Michael Hedges – guitar, bass, harp guitar, synthesizers, harmonica, vocals, alto flute
- Michael Manring – fretless bass ("Ignition", "Dirge", "Gospel", Tomorrow Never Knows")

== Production notes ==
- Produced by Michael Hedges
- Engineered by Rob Griffin + Michael Hedges
- Mastered by Bernie Grundman
