= A Familiar Path =

Studio album by At War With Self
- Released: November 2009
- Recorded: Indiana, U.S. Netherlands
- Genre: Progressive metal
- Label: Sluggo's Goon Music
- Producer: Glenn Snelwar

At War With Self chronology
Acts of God (2007)	A Familiar Path (2009)	Circadian Rhythm Disorder (2015)

A Familiar Path is the third chapter of At War With Self, a music project led by multi-instrumentalist and composer Glenn Snelwar. It is a return to Snelwar’s roots as a musician that maintains the concept of the project changing for each release. The original concept in which Snelwar combined classical guitars into progressive and thrash metal has been re-visited and fully realized with A Familiar Path. The new incarnation of At War With Self features Manfred Dikkers, who joins Snelwar again from the Acts of God sessions on drums and percussion. The tracks on A Familiar Path are “the heaviest, most aggressive and accurate version of what I’ve had in mind for combining metal and progressive influences with classical guitars” says Snelwar. Instrumental tracks such as a hybrid half-classical, half-metal rendition of a Heitor Villa-Lobos guitar study, the Slayer-meets-King Crimson aggression of Concrete and Poison and Diseased State, a new rendering of Reflections originally featured on the debut Gordian Knot disc and the guitar shred of The Ether Trail, are balanced with the vocally-centered title track and Ourselves. A Familiar Path is accompanied with artwork that completes the emotion and intensity inspired by the 42 minutes on the disc.

== Track listing ==
No.	Title	Writer(s)	Length
1.	"Reflections"	Snelwar	5:56
2.	"Diseased State"	Snelwar	3:12
3.	"A Familiar Path"	Music: Snelwar, Dikkers; Lyrics: Snelwar	9:35
4.	"The Ether Trail"	Snelwar, Dikkers	2:28
5.	"Ourselves"	Music and Lyrics: Snelwar	6:29
6.	"Etude No.10"	Heitor Villa-Lobos; Arrangement: Snelwar	4:03
7.	"Concrete and Poison"	Snelwar, Trotta, Zodda	8:01
8.	"Hope"	Snelwar	2:44

== Personnel ==
=== Band members ===
- Glenn Snelwar - electric and acoustic guitars, bass, mandolins, keyboards, e-bow, string arrangements, programming, vocals

=== Guest musicians ===
- Manfred Dikkers - drums, percussion
- Maggie Snelwar – backing vocals
