= TransTrem =

Guitar vibrato system developed by Steinberger in 1984

TransTrem is a guitar vibrato system developed by Steinberger in 1984. Its main feature is to maintain the pitch of each string at the proper tuning interval to the others when the vibrato ("Whammy bar") is used. This allows entire chords to have their pitch bent while remaining in tune, whereas a conventional vibrato system would cause the strings to go out of tune with each other. The system also allows transposition of the pitch of the guitar as a whole: the pitch of all the strings can be raised or lowered from the standard EADGBE tuning and locked into one of several preset positions. The Washburn Wonderbar from the 1980s attempted a similar approach (sans the locking feature) with far less success.

The TransTrem (or TT for short) requires custom double ball end strings to work properly. Each string is calibrated to a specific length: as little as 1/16" deviation from this specification adversely affects string tuning. As of 2009 D'Addario, La Bella, GHS and the Steinberger brand strings are the only ones offering calibrated double ball sets.

In 1987, HAZ Labs, a company that provided the electronics for Steinberger (with the exception being the pickups, which were from EMG, Inc.), built roughly two-hundred TransTrem units for the bass. This mechanism did not gain much popularity and no further bass trems were ever built; however, TransTrem equipped basses are now quite rare and valuable as collector's items.

In 2008 Steinberger introduced the third generation TransTrem (TT3) on the new Steinberger ZT3 guitar. It maintains the ability to transpose all strings in tune and lock in four other positions while making setup and string changes easier. The new headpiece on this guitar also allows the use of single ball end strings. Lastly, it moves the bridge mounted string tuners from a horizontal to a more upright position. This allows for a greater range of installations and/or body styles, as the tuner "cut out" on the tail end of the body is no longer necessary.

== Users of the TransTrem ==
- Eddie Van Halen used a Steinberger guitar with a TransTrem on several songs, including "Get Up" and "Summer Nights" (from 5150), "Pleasure Dome" (from For Unlawful Carnal Knowledge), "Fire in the Hole" (from Van Halen III), and "Me Wise Magic" (from Best Of – Volume I).
- Acclaimed virtuoso jazz fusion guitarist Allan Holdsworth used TransTrem on his custom Bill DeLap made guitar. He has also used Steinberger guitars with TransTrem.
- Innovative guitarist Michael Hedges toured with a custom Steve Klein electric harp guitar using a TransTrem bridge. This guitar can be heard on the songs "Point A" and "Point B" on his album Taproot.
- Dire Straits leader Mark Knopfler and second guitarist Jack Sonni both used Steinberger TransTrem guitars on the "Brothers In Arms" tour. Each had custom paint jobs by John Suhr of Rudy's Music Stop. Sonni used his on the song "Private Investigations" throughout the tour. His TransTrem guitar was the third one made.
- David Torn uses the TransTrem extensively and has demonstrated its use on his Painting With Guitar instructional videos.
- David Gilmour used a Steinberger GL with TransTrem bridge and Active EMG Pickups while recording the 1987 Pink Floyd album A Momentary Lapse of Reason.
- Vito Bratta of White Lion used both black and white Steinberger GM-2TA during the band's Pride and Big Game World Tour. He also used red Steinberger GM-4TA during Big Game album recording. White GM-2TA can be seen in the "When The Children Cry", "Little Fighter" and "Cry For Freedom" music videos. Black GM-2TA can be seen in a scene from the "Cry For Freedom" music video.
- Paul Masvidal of technical death metal/jazz fusion band Cynic uses Steinberger guitars with the TransTrem, most notably in the introduction of the song 'I'm But a Wave To...' and in the solo of 'Veil of Maya' from the landmark release Focus. Recently, he has started using the Steinberger ZT3 which has the new TT3.
- The YouTube Channel OhYouAteOne2uses TransTrem equipped guitars on their "TransTrem Thursday" Live Podcast
