= José Lemos (countertenor) =

Brazilian countertenor (born 1974)

José Lemos (born 22 November 1974) is a Brazilian countertenor.

== Life and career ==
José Lemos was born in Bagé, Brazil. He received his B.A. in music from the College of Charleston, completed his master's degree at the New England Conservatory in Boston, and has appeared in opera roles and in concert with companies such as Boston Baroque, Boston Cecilia, Harvard Early Music Society, Les Parlement de Musique, Piccolo Spoleto Festival Early Music Series, and the Aldeburgh Snape Proms in England.

In the summer of 2003, he made his USA opera debut at The Tanglewood Music Festival in Robert Zuidam's Rage D'Amours, and returned for their 2004 production of Britten's A Midsummer Night's Dream as Oberon. He has also joined the Tanglewood Music Center in the Los Angeles premiere of the opera Ainadamar by composer Osvaldo Golijov at the new Disney Center with the Los Angeles Philharmonic.

In April 2005 he made his European opera debut in a production of the Zürich Opera House of Handel's Giulio Cesare under the baton of Marc Minkowski. In June of the same year he performed at the Aldeburgh Festival in a production of Purcell's Fairy-Queen under the baton of Harry Bicket, receiving excellent reviews by The Times. He has made frequent appearances in places such as Jordan Hall, Chimay Theater, Ozawa Hall, Tanglewood Theater, The Cloisters Museum in New York, and the National Gallery in Washington, D.C.

== Awards ==
Lemos was the First Prize winner and the Audience Prize winner of the 2003 International Baroque Singing Competition of Chimay, Belgium.

== Associated acts ==
- The Baltimore Consort
- Brio
- Charleston Pro Musica

== Discography ==
- Adio España: Romances, Villancicos & Improvisations from Spain, Circa 1500 (2009)
- Jean-Baptiste Lully: Psyché (2008)
- Romance (with Brio, 2008)
- Stefano Landi: Il Sant' Alessio (2008)
- Sol y Luna (with Brio, 2010)
- Io Vidi in Terra (2017)
