= Custer LaRue =

American singer

- Born: Bath County, Virginia
- Genres: Folk, Renaissance
- Instrument: singing - soprano
- Years active: 1983–present

Custer LaRue is an American soprano vocalist of the late 20th and early 21st centuries. She specializes in Renaissance music and traditional folk music such as the Child ballads and music collected in Appalachia during the early 20th century.

== Biography ==
LaRue is from Bath County, Virginia, and attended Mary Baldwin College and the Peabody Conservatory, where she received a Bachelor of Music degree in 1979.

She served as the lead singer for The Baltimore Consort between 1983 and 2004, and has also worked as a solo artist with ad hoc groups of supporting musicians, with recordings released on the Dorian label.

In the movie Hunters Moon (1997) LaRue sings "Soldier Boy", a folk song, slightly changed, from the southern Appalachians.

In the 2004 film Vanity Fair, LaRue's singing was used to voice-over Reese Witherspoon's three songs "Over The Mountains/The Great Adventurer", "Now Sleeps The Crimson Petal", and "The Mermaids Song".

In 2009, she was recognized with the Peabody Alumni Achievement Award Recognizing Outstanding Contributions to Music in Maryland.
