= Michael Hedges =

American guitarist (1953–1997)

Background information
- Born: Michael Alden Hedges; December 31, 1953; Sacramento, California, U.S.
- Died: December 2, 1997 (aged 43) Mendocino County, California, U.S.
- Genres: New acoustic; world; new-age
- Occupations: Musician, songwriter
- Instruments: Guitar; vocals; flute; bass; synthesizer
- Years active: 1974–1997
- Label: Windham Hill
- Website: michaelhedges.com

Michael Alden Hedges (December 31, 1953 – December 2, 1997) was an American acoustic guitarist and songwriter. He was known as a virtuoso who used unorthodox playing techniques, and much of his output was classified as new age music. Hedges died in an auto accident, and won a posthumous Grammy Award for his album Oracle.

== Early years ==
The son of Thayne Alden Hedges and Ruth Evelyn Hedges Ipsen, Michael Hedges was born in Sacramento, California. His life in music began in Enid, Oklahoma, playing flute and guitar. He enrolled at Phillips University in Enid to study classical guitar and composition under E. J. Ulrich, who Hedges credited as his biggest influence from his academic training. Hedges studied as a composition major at the Peabody Conservatory in Baltimore, Maryland where he applied his classical background to steel-string acoustic guitar, also studying electronic music.

Hedges made a living by playing and singing in bars and restaurants in Baltimore while a student at Peabody. From 1976 to 1977 he played electric guitar and flute for a local group called Lotus Band, which he left to start performing as a solo acoustic act. In 1980, he made plans to move to California to study music at Stanford University. Hedges was contacted in February 1981 by William Ackerman who heard him perform at the Varsity Theater in Palo Alto. On a napkin, Ackerman signed Hedges to a recording contract with Windham Hill Records.

== Recordings ==
Hedges' first two albums for Windham Hill were Breakfast in the Field and Aerial Boundaries. He wrote nearly exclusively in alternate tunings. His early recordings and most of the Breakfast in the Field album were recorded on the Ken DuBourg guitar and his Martin D-28, named "Barbara". Some of the techniques he used include slap harmonics (created by slapping the strings over a harmonic node), use of right hand hammer-ons (particularly on bass notes), use of the left hand for melodic or rhythmic hammer-ons and pull offs, percussive, syncopated slapping on the guitar body, as well as unusual strumming. He made extensive use of string damping as employed in classical guitar, and was known to insist strongly on the precise duration of sounds and silences in his pieces. He played guitar variants like the harp guitar (an instrument with additional bass strings), and the TransTrem guitar. He was a multi-instrumentalist who played piano, percussion, tin whistle, harmonica, and flute. Virtuoso bassist Michael Manring contributed to nearly all of Hedges' records.

Frustrated that his published work reflected only the instrumental side of his creative output, Hedges convinced Windham Hill to release Watching My Life Go By, a 1985 studio recording of his vocal originals written over a span of five years—songs often performed at his concerts leading up to the album's release. His fourth album, a live recording called Live on the Double Planet, was assembled from 40 of his live concerts from 1986 to 1987. He also contributed the song "Because It's There" to the soundtrack of the 1986 Naomi Uemura biographical film Lost in the Wilderness.

His musical education was largely in modern 20th-century composition. He listened to Martin Carthy, John Martyn, and the Beatles, but his approach to composition owed much to Igor Stravinsky, Edgard Varèse, Anton Webern, and Steve Reich, in addition to experimental composers such as Morton Feldman. He saw himself as a composer who played guitar, rather than a guitarist who composed music. He was often categorized as a new-age musician because of his association with Windham Hill.

Hedges toured briefly with Leo Kottke. These shows included solo performances by Kottke and Hedges and, as a finale, a number of duets including performances of Kottke's "Doodles" with Hedges playing a high-strung parlor guitar.

Hedges' Aerial Boundaries album, released in 1984, included a tribute piece to the works of acoustic guitarist Pierre Bensusan, simply entitled "Bensusan". Bensusan posthumously returned tribute on his 2001 release Intuite ("Favored Nations"), with a composition entitled "So Long Michael".

== Personal life ==
Hedges was married to flautist Mindy Rosenfeld but the couple divorced in the late 1980s.

== Death ==
According to his manager Hilleary Burgess, Hedges was driving home from San Francisco International Airport after a visit to a girlfriend in Long Island, New York. His car apparently skidded off a rain-slicked S-curve and down a 120-foot (37 m) cliff. Hedges was thrown from his car and appeared to have died nearly instantly. His body was found a few days afterward. After his death, his album Oracle won the 1997 Grammy Award for Best New Age Album.

Hedges' unfinished last recordings were completed for the album Torched with the help of Burgess and friends David Crosby and Graham Nash, who also provided backing vocals on one track.

== Guitars ==
Hedges regularly used the following instruments:

- 1971 Martin D-28 guitar (nicknamed "Barbara") with a combination of a Sunrise S-1 magnetic pickup and FRAP contact pickup under the treble strings
- A 1978 Ken DuBourg custom made steel string guitar (stolen and returned many years later)
- A custom 1980s Takamine guitar with his name on the headstock
- Lowden L-25 guitars
- Martin J-65M guitars
- 1920s Dyer harp guitar configured with a FRAP/autoharp pickup combo / reconfigured with Sunrise S-1 and two Barcus Berry magnetic pickups for the sub-basses (glued straight to the body)
- Steve Klein electric harp guitar with a Steinberger TransTrem bridge
- circa 1913 black Knutsen harp guitar (often incorrectly referred to as a Dyer) with a FRAP/autoharp pickup combo—and rattlesnake tail wedged under the sub-basses at the headstock
- Custom Ervin Somogyi acoustic (as credited on Breakfast in the Field)

== Discography ==
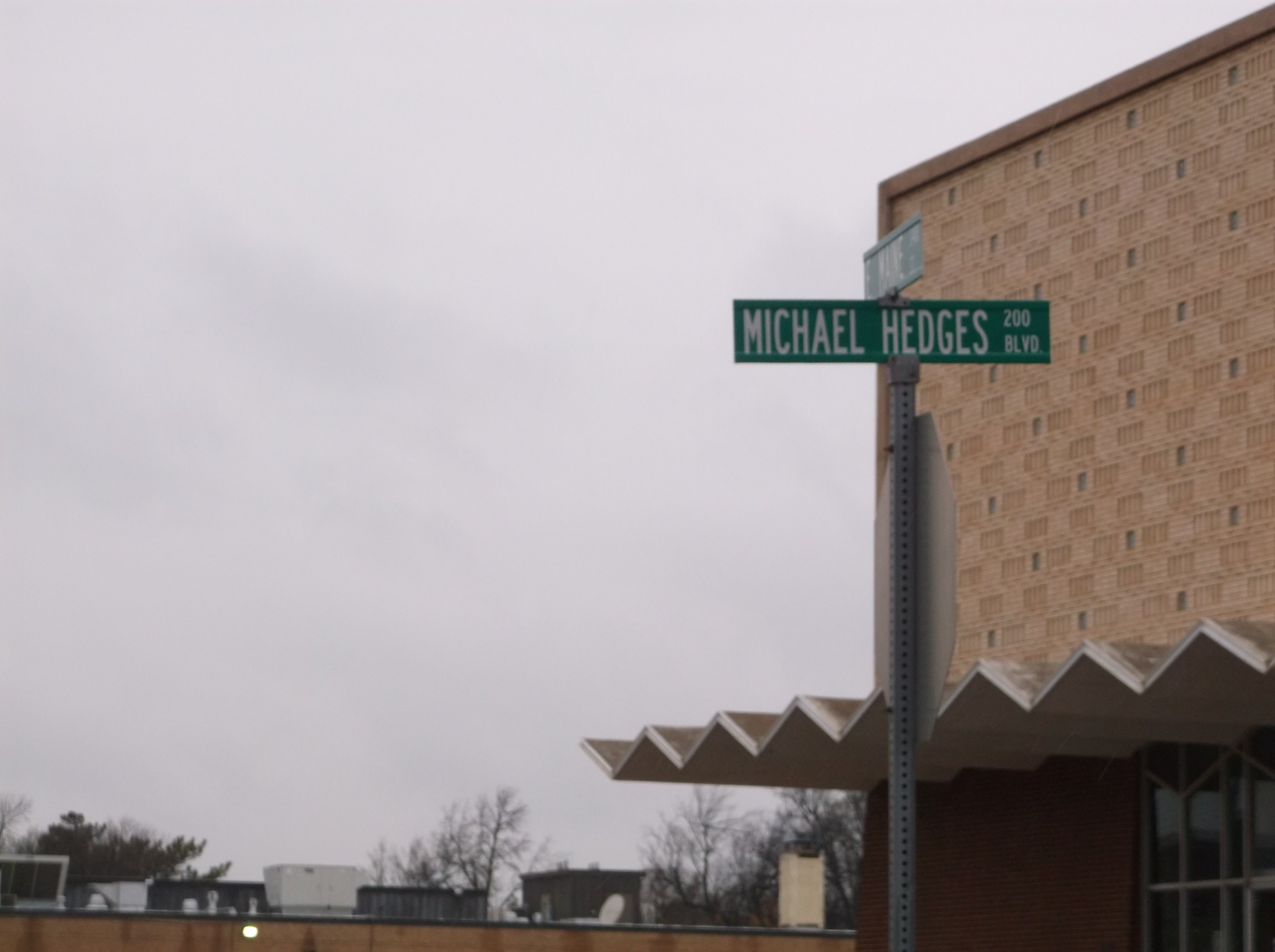
Michael Hedges Blvd., on the Northern Oklahoma College (former Phillips University) campus in Enid, Oklahoma.

- Breakfast in the Field (Windham Hill, 1981)
- Aerial Boundaries (Windham Hill, 1984)
- Watching My Life Go By (Open Air, 1985)
- Santabear's First Christmas (1986)
- Live on the Double Planet (Windham Hill, 1987)
- Strings of Steel (1988)
- Taproot (Windham Hill, 1990)
- Princess Scargo and the Birthday Pumpkin (1993)
- The Road to Return (High Street, 1994)
- Oracle (Windham Hill, 1996)
- Torched (Windham Hill, 1999)

== See also ==
- List of ambient music artists
