= Dorian Recordings =

- Founded: 1988
- Founder: Craig Dory & Brian Levine
- Defunct: 2011
- Status: Defunct
- Genre: Classical music
- Country of origin: United States
- Location: Troy, New York

Dorian Recordings was a record label based in Troy, New York, most noted for its extensive series of early music recordings.

Dorian made many of its recordings at the Troy Savings Bank Music Hall, and supported the local all-classical radio station WMHT-FM with recordings of local concerts for broadcast. The label also recorded and published many Latin American compositions, including nine discs with the Simon Bolivar Symphony Orchestra of Venezuela, and a complete series of the Heitor Villa-Lobos string quartets. Dorian made the first recordings of violinist Rachel Barton, the first recording entirely of instrumental chamber works by Mohammed Fairouz, and several CDs with the Czech pianists Ivan Moravec and Antonin Kubalek. The label also recorded the Baltimore Consort with lutenist Ronn McFarlane, collaborations between McFarlane and Julianne Baird, and a series of folk music recordings.

Dorian Recordings' catalog was acquired by Sono Luminus, a company launched in 2005 and based in Winchester, Virginia.
