= Mindy Rosenfeld =

American flutist, piper and harpist

Mindy Rosenfeld is an American flutist, piper and harpist, noted as a founding member of the Baltimore Consort, specializing in Renaissance music. She is also credited as Mindy Rosenfeld Hedges.

== Life and career ==
Mindy Rosenfeld, graduated with a Bachelor of Music in Flute Performance from the Peabody Conservatory in Baltimore, Maryland, and a Master of Music in Modern and Baroque Flute Performance from San Francisco Conservatory. She was one of the founding members of the Baltimore Consort in 1980. She remains a performing member, and tours extensively with the group.

In 1989, she became a member of San Francisco’s Philharmonia Baroque Orchestra where she has made numerous recordings, and appeared in Lincoln Center’s Mostly Mozart Festival, BBC Proms at Royal Albert Hall, the Berkeley Early Music Festival, Concertgebouw in Amsterdam, Disney Hall and Carnegie Hall. Rosenfeld is Principal Flutist and soloist with the Symphony of the Redwoods and the Mendocino Music Festival in California. She has performed as a guest artist with a number of other symphonies and ensembles.

== Personal life ==
Rosenfeld was married to American composer and guitarist Michael Hedges (1953-1997),

Rosenfeld is the mother of five children: Mischa Aaron Hedges, Jasper Alden Hedges, Sascha Benjamin Burgess, Oliver Burgess, and Theo Robinson Burgess. Rosenfeld resides in California.

== Discography ==
Selected recordings include:

- Aerial Boundaries CD (1985)
- Baltimore Consort Live In Concert CD (2008)
- Taproot CD (1990)
- Telemann: Six Sonatas For Two Flutes, Op. 2 CD (1998)
- One Morning CD (2010)
- Indigo Road CD (2007)
