= Alex De Grassi =

American fingerstyle guitarist

Alex de Grassi
- Born: February 13, 1952 (age 74); Yokosuka, Japan
- Genre: New Age
- Occupation: Musician
- Instrument: Guitar
- Years active: 1976–present
- Labels: Windham Hill, Novus, Tropo, Lifescapes, 33rd Street
- Website: www.degrassi.com

Alex de Grassi (born February 13, 1952) is an American fingerstyle guitarist, author, composer and performer. Tom Wheeler wrote in Guitar Player magazine that his technique is "the kind that shoves fellow pickers to the cliff of decision: should I practice like a madman or chuck it altogether?" De Grassi was invited by his cousin William Ackerman to join the Windham Hill label and became one of the label's best sellers.

== Discography ==
- Turning: Turning Back, (Windham Hill, 1978)
- Slow Circle, (Windham Hill, 1979)
- Clockwork, (Windham Hill, 1981)
- Southern Exposure, (Windham Hill, 1983)
- Altiplano, (RCA/Novus, 1987)
- Deep at Night, (Windham Hill, 1991)
- The World's Getting Loud, (Windham Hill, 1993)
- Beyond the Night Sky: Lullabies for Guitar, (EarthBeat, 1996)
- Alex de Grassi's Interpretation of Simon & Garfunkel, (Northsound, 1997)
- Alex de Grassi's Interpretation of James Taylor, (NorthSound, 1998)
- The Water Garden, (Tropo, 1998)
- Bolivian Blues Bar, (Narada, 1999)
- Tatamonk with Quique Cruz, (Tropo, 2000)
- Shortwave Postcard with G.E. Stinson, (Auditorium, 2001)
- Now & Then: Folk Songs for the 21st Century, (33rd Street, 2003)
- The Bridge, (Tropo, 2020)
