= Julianne Baird =

American soprano (born 1952)

- Born: December 10, 1952 (age 73); Statesville, North Carolina
- Genres: Opera, Baroque
- Occupations: Singer, voice professor
- Instrument: Vocals

Julianne Baird (born December 10, 1952) is an American soubrette and early music soprano. She has appeared with the New York Philharmonic, Cleveland Symphony, San Francisco Symphony, St. Paul Chamber Orchestra, Theatre de la Monnaie, Bach Festival Leipzig amongst many. She has recorded with Christopher Hogwood, John Eliot Gardiner, Joshua Rifkin and sung on five of the world’s continents in both opera and Sacred Music. She has more than 100 recordings to her credit and is a well-traveled recitalist and soloist with major symphony orchestras. She is also a noted teacher of voice.

== Biography ==
Baird grew up in Kent, Ohio, graduating from Kent's Theodore Roosevelt High School in 1970. She studied voice and Musicology at the Eastman School of Music, earned a Diploma in Performance Practice from the Salzburg Mozarteum, and earned a Doctor of Philosophy degree in Musicology from Stanford University.

Baird has been a Distinguished professor at Rutgers University-Camden since 2000. She directs a Madrigal Ensemble and teaches a wide array of classes such as History of Opera, Renaissance and Baroque Music. She frequently teaches master classes and workshops throughout the United States. She published an annotated translation of the 18th-century treatise, Introduction to the Art of Singing by Johann Friedrich Agricola (Cambridge University Press, 1995).

As a performer, she is best known for her extensive discography and for performances of music by Johann Sebastian Bach (especially the B-minor Mass, the Magnificat, and a number of cantatas) and George Frideric Handel (especially Messiah). She has made premiere recordings of a number of Handel operas (including Deidamia, Siroe, Muzio Scevola, Sosarme, and Berenice). She has also sung works by Henry Purcell, John Dowland, Claudio Monteverdi, and Georg Philipp Telemann. Modern American composers whose music she has recorded include Lukas Foss and Steve Reich.

== Recordings ==
=== Complete Operas ===
Year	Composer	Title	Conductor/Orchestra	Role	Publisher	Format	Other notes
1986	Handel	Imeneo	Rudolph Palmer, Brewer Baroque Orchestra	Rosmene	Vox	CD, Digital	First Recording
1987	Monteverdi	L’Orfeo	John Eliot Gardiner, Monteverdi Choir: The English Baroque Soloists	Euridice	Archiv	CD, Digital	
1990	Telemann	Pimpinone	Rudolph Palmer, Baroque Orchestra of St. Luke	Vespetta	Newport Classic	CD, Digital	
1991	Handel	Siroe	Rudolph Palmer, Brewer Baroque Orchestra	Emira	Newport Classic	CD, Digital	Premiere Recording
1991	Handel	Muzio Scevola	Rudolph Palmer, Brewer Baroque Orchestra	Clelia	Newport Classic	CD, Digital	Premiere Recording
1993	Pergolesi	La Serva Padrona	Rudolph Palmer, Philomel Baroque Orchestra	Serpina	Omega Record Classics	CD, Digital	
1994	Handel	Sosarme	Johannes Somary, Amor Artis Orchestra	Elmira	Newport Classic	CD, Digital	
1994	Purcell	Dido and Aeneas	Christopher Hogwood, Academy of Ancient Music	Second Woman	Decca L’Oiseau-Lyre	CD, Digital	
1994	Handel	Berenice	Rudolph Palmer, Brewer Baroque Orchestra	Berenice	Newport Classic	CD, Digital	Premiere Recording
1994	Purcell	Dido and Aeneas; The Indian Queen	Christopher Hogwood, Academy of Ancient Music	Second Woman	Decca: L’Oiseau-Lyre	CD, Digital	
1995	Handel	Ezio	Richard Auldon Clark, Manhattan Chamber Orchestra	Fulvia	Vox	CD, Digital	Premiere Recording
1996	Handel	Faramondo	Rudolph Palmer, Brewer Baroque Orchestra	Clotilde	Vox	CD, Digital	Premiere Recording
1997	Lukas Foss	The Jumping Frog of Calaveras County	Richard Auldon Clark, Manhattan Chamber Orchestra	Miss Lulu	Newport Classic	CD, Digital	
2001	Handel	Deidamia	Rudolph Palmer, Brewer Baroque Orchestra	Deidamia	Albany	CD	Premiere Recording
2004	Gluck	Il Parnaso Confuso	Rudolph Palmer, The Queen’s Chamber Band	Melpomene	Albany Records	CD	Premiere Recording
2005	Gluck	La Corona	Rudolph Palmer, The Queen’s Chamber Band	Atalanta	Albany Records	CD	First CD Recording
2007	Purcell	Dido and Aeneas	Valentin Radu: Ama Deus Baroque Ensemble	Dido	Lyrichord	CD	Title Role

=== J.S. Bach Cantatas, Passions and Masses-Complete Works ===
Year	Title	Conductor/Orchestra	Publisher	Format	Other notes
1982	B minor Mass BWV 232	Joshua Rifkin: The Bach Ensemble	Nonesuch	CD, Digital (OVPP)	LP and Audio Cassette
1982	Magnificat BWV 243	Joshua Rifkin: The Bach Ensemble	Pro Arte Records	CD, Digital (OVPP)	Audio Cassette
1986	St. John Passion BWV 245	Anthony Newman, Brandenburg Collegium	Newport Classic	CD, Digital	Audio Cassette
1987	Cantatas BWV 140 BWV 51, "Jauchzet Gott"	Joshua Rifkin: The Bach Ensemble	Éditions de l'Oiseau-Lyre	CD, Digital (OVPP)	Audio Cassette
1988	Cantatas BWV 202, BWV 209	Joshua Rifkin: The Bach Ensemble	Éditions de l'Oiseau-Lyre; Solo Cantatas	CD, Digital	Soprano Cantatas
1989	BWV 8, BWV 78, BWV 99	Joshua Rifkin: The Bach Ensemble	Éditions de l'Oiseau-Lyre	CD, Digital (OVPP)	Audio cassette
1990	BWV 147, BWV 80, BWV 8, BWV 140 BWV 51, BWV 78	Joshua Rifkin: The Bach Ensemble	Éditions de l'Oiseau-Lyre	CD, Digital (OVPP)	
1990	St. John Passion BWV 245	Kenneth Slowik, Smithsonian Chamber Players and Smithsonian Chamber Chorus	Smithsonian Recordings	CD, Digital	
1992	Trauerode, BWV 8, BWV 156, BWV 198	Jeffrey Thomas, American Bach Soloists	Koch Intl	CD, Digital	Volume 2
1992	Solo Cantatas BWV 51, BWV 54, BWV 55, BWV 82	Jeffrey Thomas, American Bach Soloists	Koch Intl	CD, Digital	
1995	"Cantatas from Mühlhausen and Weimar", BWV 12, BWV 18, BWV 61	Jeffrey Thomas, American Bach Soloists	Koch Intl	CD, Digital	Volume 5
1996	Magnificat BWV 243	Valentin Radu: Ama Deus Baroque Ensemble	Vox Classics	CD, Digital	
1996	B minor Mass BWV 232	Valentin Radu: Ama Deus Baroque Ensemble	Vox Classics	CD, Digital	
1997	6 Favourite Cantatas	Joshua Rifkin: The Bach Ensemble	L’Oiseau-Lyre	CD (OVPP)	
1998	Actus Tragicus	Joshua Rifkin: The Bach Ensemble	Decca	CD (OVPP)	Select Cantatas
1998	Sacred Cantatas	Joshua Rifkin: The Bach Ensemble	Naxos	Digital (OVPP)	Online, Digital Library
2011	101 Bach	Joshua Rifkin: The Bach Ensemble	Decca	Digital (OVPP)	6 CD set

=== Oratorios ===
Year	Composer	Title	Conductor/Orchestra	Role	Publisher	Format	Other notes
1988	Handel	Acis and Galatea	Johannes Somary, Amor Artis Orchestra	Galatea	Newport Classic	CD, Digital	Cassette, Digital
1991	Handel	Joshua	Rudolph Palmer, Brewer Baroque Orchestra	Achsah	Newport Classic	CD, Digital	
1993	Scarlatti	Ishmael	Rudolph Palmer, Brewer Baroque Orchestra	Ismaele	Newport Classic	CD, Digital	Premiere Recording
1991	Handel	Dixit Dominus	James Litton, American Boy Choir		Musical Heritage	CD, Digital	Premiere Recording
1996	Handel	Acis and Galatea	Valentin Radu: Ama Deus Baroque Ensemble	Galatea	Vox	CD, Digital	
1997	Vivaldi	Magnificat, Gloria	Valentin Radu: Ama Deus Baroque Ensemble		Newport Classic	CD, Digital	
1997	Handel	Alexander Balus	Rudolph Palmer, Philomel Baroque Orchestra	Cleopatra	Newport Classic	CD, Digital	
1994	Handel	Gloria, Handel in Rome	Rudolph Palmer, The Queen’s Chamber Band		Lyrichord	CD, Digital	
2020	Purcell	Excerpts from the fairy queen; Odes and elegies for Queen Mary	Frederick Renz, Ensemble for Early Music	Soprano, Soloist	Naxos	CD, Digital, Audio, Cassette	

=== Recitals ===
Year	Composer	Title	Collaborators	Publisher	Format	Other notes
1981		Spanish Music in the Age of Exploration	Michael Jaffee, Waverly Consort	CBS Masterworks	CD	LP, Audio Cassette (Fr. Version)
1982	Reich	Tehillim	Zubin Mehta, New York Philharmonic	New York Philharmonic Special Editions, New York, ℗1999	10 CD Box Set, Digital	NY Phil: An American Celebration Vol. 2
1983	Telemann/Melani	Baroque Music of love and war	Badinage	Musical Heritage Soc.	LP	
1988	16th & 17th English Composers	The English Lute Song	Ronn McFarlane, Lute	Dorian	CD, Digital	
1988	Handel	Handel in Italy	John Ostendorf, Baritone	Newport Classic	CD	"Mi Palpita il core"
1989	Telemann	Harmonischer Gottes-Dienst	James Bowman, Music’s Re-creation	Newport Classic	CD, Digital	Packe dich
1989	16th & 17th English Composers	Greensleeves	Ronn McFarlane, Lute	Dorian	CD, Digital	In Darkness Let me Dwell
1990	Handel, Caccini	Songs of Love and War	Colin Tilney, harpsichord	Dorian	CD, Digital	La Lucrezia, Amarilli 2971
1990	Caccini	Dorian Sampler, Vol. 3	Various	Dorian, Sono Luminus	CD, Digital	Amor ch’attendi
1990	Clérambault	Clérambault Dramatic Cantatas	Music’s Re-creation	Meridian Records	CD, Digital	Orphée, Héro e Leandre
1990	Misc	Lullabies and Dances	Bill Crofut Consort	Albany	CD, Digital	
1990	Handel	Italian Solo Cantatas and Instrumental Works	Music’s Re-creation	Meridian Records	CD, Digital	Occhi miei che faceste, Quel fior che all’alba ride
1991	Dowland	Awake Sweet Love: The Music of John Dowland	David Tayler, lute DeCormier Singers	Arabesque Recordings	CD, Digital	His Golden Locks
1991	Handel, Vivaldi	Handel –The Italian Years	Philomel Baroque Orchestra; Wendy Gillespie, viola da gamba	Dorian, Sono Luminus	CD	Tra le Fiamme, All’ombra di Sospetto
1991	Montéclair, Clérambault	French Cantatas of the 18th Century	American Baroque, Stephen Schultz	Koch	CD, Digital	
1992	Arne, Blow, Purcell	English Mad Songs and Ayres	Colin Tilney, harpsichord	Dorian, Sono Luminus	CD, Digital	Sleep, Gentle Cherub
1992	Misc.	Lullabies: A Songbook Companion	Richard Kapp, piano	ESS.AY records	CD, Digital	For Met Museum, Baloo
1992	Handel	Dorian Sampler, Vol. 5	Colin Tilney, harpsichord	Dorian, Sono Luminus	CD, Digital	Handel: Lucrezia, HWV 145
1992	Cavalli, Monteverdi	Musica Dolce: Works by Caccini, Monteverdi, Rossi, D’India and Others	Colin Tilney, harpsichord	Dorian, Sono Luminus	CD, Digital	Musica Dolce, Ohime
1993	Mozart	Songs of Mozart	Colin Tilney, fortepiano	Dorian, Sono Luminus	CD, Digital	An Chlöe
1994	Bach	Arias for Soprano and Flute	Emily Newbold, flute	Newport Classic	CD, Digital	
1994	Hasse	Cantatas, Ballads and Sonatas	Nancy Hadden, flute	CRD Records	CD, Digital	Si, la gondola
1994	Handel	Handel Favorites with America’s Finest Early Music Soprano	Edward Brewer, Harpsichord	Newport Classic	CD, Digital	O sleep, why dost thou leave me
1994	Stephen Foster	Parlour Songs, Duets	Frederick Urrey, Linda Russell	Albany	CD, Digital	Wilt thou be gone, Love
1995	Orbon, De Falla	Manuel de Falla and Julian Orbón	Eduardo Mata, conductor Solistas de Mexico; Rafael Puyana	Dorian, Sono Luminus	CD, Digital	Tres Cantigas del Rey
1996	Monteverdi, Caccini, Biabo	The Italian Lute Song	Ronn McFarlane, Lute	Dorian, Sono Luminus	CD, Digital	Laudate, Dolcissimo, Fuggi, fuggi
1996	Austen, Bound Collections and Mss.	Austen: Jane’s Hand: The Jane Austen Songbooks	Anthony Newman; Mary Jane Newman, fortepiano	Vox	CD, Digital	O Nanny
1996	Tin Pan Alley and early 20th c	Turn of the Century Parlor Songs and Rags	Rudolph Palmer, Piano	Vox	CD, Digital	Teasin’, Bohemian Rag
1996	Handel	Handel –Greatest Arias	Rudolph Palmer, Brewer Chamber Orchestra	Newport Classic	CD, Digital	Angels ever Bright and Fair
1997	Schubert	Winterreise: Original 1827 Version	Andrew Willis, fortepiano	Newport Classic	CD, Digital	Der Lindenbaum
1997	Handel	Where’re You Walk: Favourite English Arias	Rudolph Palmer, Brewer Chamber Orchestra	Newport Classic	CD, Digital	
1997	Various Composers	Angels of Antiquity	Ronn McFarlane, Lute	Dorian, Sono Luminus	CD, Digital	Have you seen the Bright Lily
1998	Various Composers	The Art of the American Singer		Newport Classic	CD	
1999	Handel	Glorious Handel	Rudolph Palmer, Brewer Chamber Orchestra	Newport Classic	CD, Digital	Calm thou my Soul
1999	Fanny Mendelssohn	Lieder	Keith Weber, fortepiano	Newport Classic	CD	Die Nonne
1999	Various 16th c	Elizabeth’s Music	Ronn McFarlane, Lute	Dorian, Sono Luminus	CD	Shall I come Sweet Love
1999	Gluck, Storace	The Songs of Jane Austen from her own music books	Philip Anderson, tenor	Vox	CD, Digital	I have a Silent Sorrow
2000	Dowland	Passionate Pavans & Galliards	Marshall Coid, countertenor	Lyrichord	CD, Digital	
2000	Misc. 16th-17th c.	Shakespeare’s Music	Ronn McFarlane, Lute	Dorian, Sono Luminus	CD, Digital	Come Away, Hecate
2002	Rossini	Rossini in Venice	Andrew Willis, fortepiano Frederick Urrey	Albany	CD, Digital	
2004	Haydn	Celtic Caravans	Linda Burman-Hall	MSR Classics	CD	Will ye go to Flanders
2005	Purcell	Oh the Sweet Delights of Love	Karen Flint, Laura Heimes	Plectra	CD	
2005	Arne	Benjamin Franklin’s Musical World	Philomel Baroque	Spirituoso Classics	CD	
2006	Misc. 15th 16th c	Da Vinci – Music from his Time	Michael Jaffee, Waverly Consort	Sony	CD	
2006	Misc 16th-18th c	Music in the Life of Benjamin Franklin	David & Ginger Hildebrand	Colonial Music Institute	CD	
2007	Handel	Flaming Rose: Nine German Arias	Tempesta di Mare	Chandos	CD, Digital	Süsse Stille
2008	Handel, Scarlatti	Soprano Arias with trumpet and organ	Darin Kelly, trumpet	Albany	CD, Digital	Eternal Source
2008	Handel	Love in Arcadia: Duets and Trios	Brandywine Baroque	Plectra	CD	
2009	Bartok, Kodaly	Roumanian Dances	Bill Crofut Consort	Albany, Naxos Music	CD, Digital	
2009	Clérambault, De la Guerre	Clérambault and Elizabeth Jacquet de la Guerre Cantates Françoises	Brandywine Baroque	Plectra	CD	
2009	Misc. 16th 17th c	Les Amours de Mai	Parthenia	MSR Classics	CD, Digital	
2010	Misc.	A Dorian Portrait		Naxos Music Library	Digital	
2012	Handel	Handel’s Italian Muse	Dryden Ensemble	Dryden Ensemble	CD, Digital	
2013	Crofut	Dance on a Moonbeam	Meryl Streep, Bill Crofut, London Symphony	Telarc Records	CD, Digital	
2017	Telemann	Six Moral Cantatas	Steven Zohn, flute	Centaur	CD, Digital	
2017	Monteverdi	The Beauty of Monteverdi	L’Orfeo	Deutsche Grammophon	CD, Digital	
2018	de La Guerre	Complete Sacred Cantatas	Brandywine Baroque	Plectra	CD, Digital	
2021	De Falla	Manuel de Falla Collection	Eduardo Mata	Brilliant Classics	CD, Digital	Psyché
2021	Albrecht Mendelssohn-Bartholdy	Songs for Lena	Eva Mengelkoch, piano	Naxos Music	CD, Digital	

=== Music for Christmas (Recordings) ===
Year	Composer	Title	Conductor/Orchestra	Publisher	Format	Other notes
1982	Medieval Composers	The Christmas Story	Michael Jaffee, Waverly Consort	CBS Masterworks	CD	LP, Audio Cassette
1993	Bach, Scarlatti	A Baroque Christmas	Julianne Baird and Aulos Ensemble	Musical Heritage	CD	Audio Cassette
1994	Handel	Messiah	Valentin Radu: Ama Deus Baroque Ensemble	Vox	CD	Convent Garden Version
1994	Trad. Carols, Bach, Scarlatti	A Baroque Christmas from The Metropolitan Museum of Art	Julianne Baird and Aulos Ensemble	MusicMasters	CD	
1995	Misc. Renaissance Composers	A Renaissance Noël: Christmas Music for Chorus, Brass and Solo Soprano	Valentin Radu: Ama Deus Baroque Ensemble	PolyGram N.Y.	CD	
1995	Handel	Messiah Highlights	Valentin Radu: Ama Deus Baroque Ensemble	Vox	CD	
1996	Handel	Messiah	Jeannette Sorrell, Apollo’s Fire	Onda, Cleveland, OH	CD	
1997	Misc. Baroque Composers	A Baroque Christmas	Valentin Radu: Ama Deus Baroque Ensemble	Vox	CD	
2006	Bruhns, Böddeker	In Dulci Jubilo	Rudolph Palmer, Brewer Baroque Orchestra	Centaur	CD	
2010	Elizabethan Christmas	As it Fell on a Holie Eve	Parthenia Viol Consort	MSR Classics	CD	

== Sources ==
- Cummings, David (ed.), "Baird, Julianne", International Who's Who in Classical Music, Routledge, 2003, p. 38. ISBN 1-85743-174-X
- Gehman, Geoff, "Spotlight on Julianne Baird Soprano Can Fit Classical Music into Social Setting", Morning Call, 16 January 1999, p. A7.
- Stearns, David Patrick, "A Career Full of Incident - Julianne Baird, Baroque Soprano Extraordinaire", Philadelphia Inquirer, 19 October 2005
