= The Jumping Frog of Calaveras County =

1950 American comic opera in one act by Lukas Foss

- Opera by Lukas Foss
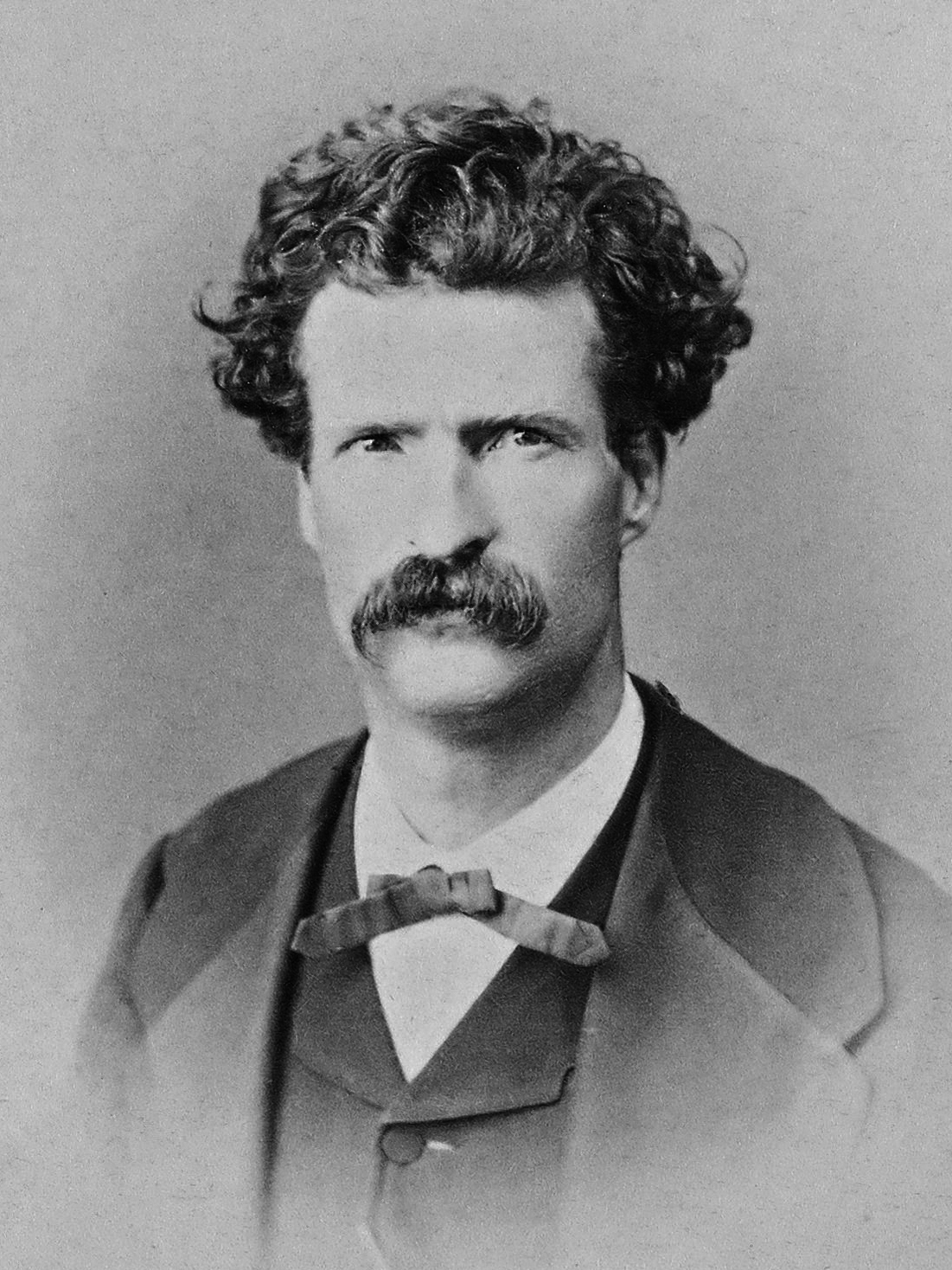
- Mark Twain in 1867
- Librettist: Jean Karsavina
- Language: English
- Based on: "The Celebrated Jumping Frog of Calaveras County" by Mark Twain (1865)
- Premiere: 18 May 1950; East Hall, Indiana University, Bloomington, Indiana

The Jumping Frog of Calaveras County is an English language American comic opera in one act and two scenes. It was composed by Lukas Foss with a libretto by Jean Karsavina, based on Mark Twain's 1865 short story "The Celebrated Jumping Frog of Calaveras County". The opera was commissioned for television by Roger Englander. It was first staged by Indiana University Opera Theatre at Indiana University's East Hall in Bloomington on May 18, 1950.

The short opera—around forty-five minutes running time–quickly gained notice: it was work-shopped fifteen times in its first three years and received at least eighteen productions in the six years after its premiere. It is a popular production for small opera companies and student productions.

== Synopsis ==
Setting: Calaveras County, California, during the Gold Rush, 1850s. The first scene is inside Uncle Henry's saloon, the second out in the town square.

Smiley brags of the talents of his jumping frog, Dan'l Webster, to Uncle Henry and his niece Lulu. The Stranger enters and hears Smiley's boasting. When the Stranger doubts Dan'l's abilities, Smiley bets $40 that Dan'l can best any other frog in Calaveras County. The Stranger says he does not have a frog to compete so Smiley leaves to find one. Uncle Henry leaves to tell the townspeople of the wager. The Stranger flirts with Lulu, who invites him to dinner. After she leaves, The Stranger takes down a shotgun off the wall and empties it of its buckshot. The Stranger feeds the buckshot to the frog, singing of how he goes from town to town as a confidence man.

The action moves to the town square. A guitar player strums "Sweet Betsy from Pike" while two men shoot craps. Uncle Henry tells them of the wager on Dan'l Webster. The men disapprove of Lulu's interest in the Stranger. She enters with the Stranger and tells him she hopes he will return to her town. Smiley returns with a frog for the competition. When it begins, the Stranger's frog jumps but Dan'l Webster does not move. The Stranger takes his winnings and leaves. Smiley picks up Dan'l Webster, who vomits the buckshot. Realizing the Stranger's deception, the men leave to find the Stranger. When they haul him back to the square, they rough him up, take his money, and order him to leave town forever.

== Performances ==
Ernst Hoffman conducted the premiere at Bloomington and Hans Busch directed it. The first run had three performances—May 18, 19, and 20—all on a double bill with another world premiere opera, The Veil by Bernard Rogers. The original cast included Alton E. Wilder, Lou Herbert, and Charles Campbell in the leads.

The New York City premiere followed three weeks later when the After Dinner Opera Company performed it on June 7, 1950, at the Master Theatre, Riverside Drive at 103rd Street. The company's four performances were on a triple bill with Johann Sebastian Bach's Coffee Cantata staged as an opera called Grounds for Divorce and Marc Blitzstein's 1929 opera Triple-Sec. Richard Flusser, founder of the company, directed. After Dinner did not use an orchestra; Foss was at the piano. Cecil Smith said of the performance "its tone essentially seems to be that of early Kurt Weill and the other Central European composers who became fascinated with American popular idiom. While Foss writes more like an American than Weill, a dry cynicism often creeps into the score and removes it in mood from the ambling colloquialism of Mark Twain's story."

Foss conducted a performance at the Berkshire Music Festival at Tanglewood on July 30, 1950; the director was Sarah Caldwell. The Chautauqua Opera performed it in 1952.

Several performances were given overseas. The Venice Festival of Contemporary Music performed the work in 1953. Opera, reviewing the Venice production, complimented Foss for his "skilled and sympathetic touch" in creating "a pungent and expressive folk opera of no small distinction". The opera was given in Cologne, West Germany, in 1956.

A performance was given in 1959 at the Royal Court Theatre in London.

Caldwell's Opera New England performed the opera in 1974, 1978, 1986, and 1989.

The score was published by Carl Fischer Music in 1951. Fischer published a revised edition in 1968.

== Recordings ==
The After Dinner Opera Company in 1951 released a recording on Lyrichord Discs without an orchestra and only a piano accompaniment by Frederic Kurzweil. A review stated "the music is functional rather than memorable and there are a few opportunities for the singers to use their legato style. Not all the diction is easy to follow, for things happen fast, and the demands on the listeners attention are considerable. In short, here is modern American opera serving comedy, as Weill's Down in the Valley served tragedy." Arthur Berger's review in the Saturday Review called the opera "a forceful work as outrightly American in feeling as anything any American composer has written" but faulted the recording for sounding like a rehearsal take. Donald Richie in the American Record Guide was the inverse, praising the recording for its "fine diction" and good sound but faulting the opera itself as "an empty, labored and pretentious work", whose "inept libretto" did not connect with the music. The New Records said the piano accompaniment drowned out the singers and the lack of a libretto with the recording made it difficult to understand the singers.

The Manhattan Chamber Orchestra in October 1996 recorded Jumping Frog at the Church of the Epiphany in New York City, released the next year on the Newport Classic label. A review in the Deseret News praised conductor Richard Auldon Clark for "keep[ing] things hopping, his singers likewise leaping into their roles with polish and enthusiasm" and Foss's music, particularly the opera's overture, "with its Appalachian Spring-like flavor".

Another review of the recording was exuberant in praise: "By the first scene, however, Foss has plunked himself down in the mining camp (at least as a tourist), and the interest–particularly the rhythmic interest–picks up. The music sparkles, every note tells. Foss's speech-setting, artificial as a Fruit Roll-Up, nevertheless comes across as vernacular. It inhabits a twilight of neoclassicism, folk song, and musical comedy. I feel as if I'm watching some gorgeous clockwork mechanism reeling off fiddle tunes, waltzes, even scat. This isn't the West as it was or even as Twain depicts it, but a loving homage to the West by a master musical jeweler."

== Roles ==
Roles, voice types, premieres casts
Role	Voice type	Indiana University premiere, Bloomington, May 28, 1950 Conductor: Ernst Hoffmann	After Dinner Opera Company, New York premiere, 1950	Berkshire Music Festival, Tanglewood, 1950 Conductor: Lukas Foss	Manhattan Chamber Orchestra recording, 1997 Conductor: Richard Auldon Clark
Smiley	tenor	Alton E. Wilder	Burton Trimble	Nino Luciano	Frederick Urrey
Stranger	bass	Charles Campbell	Paul Ukena	Luis Pichardo	Kevin Deas
Lulu	mezzo-soprano	Lou Herber	Ruth Biller	Eunice Alberts	Julianne Baird
Uncle Henry	baritone		Elvin Campbell	Carmon Caplinger	Peter Castaldi
First Crapshooter	tenor		Karl Brock	Gene Cox	Geoffrey Friedley
Second Crapshooter	bass		Ahti Tuuri	Albert Basso	Mark Moliterno
Guitar Player	baritone		Ralph Cavalucci	Mac Morgan	Christopher Arneson
