= Chorpenning =

Chorpenning is a surname. Notable people with the surname include:

- Charlotte Chorpenning (1872–1955), American playwright
- George Chorpenning (1820–1894), American transportation pioneer
- Ruth Chorpenning (1898–1980), American stage actress and monologuist
