= Triple-Sec =

1929 American comic opera in one act by Marc Blitzstein

- Opera by Marc Blitzstein
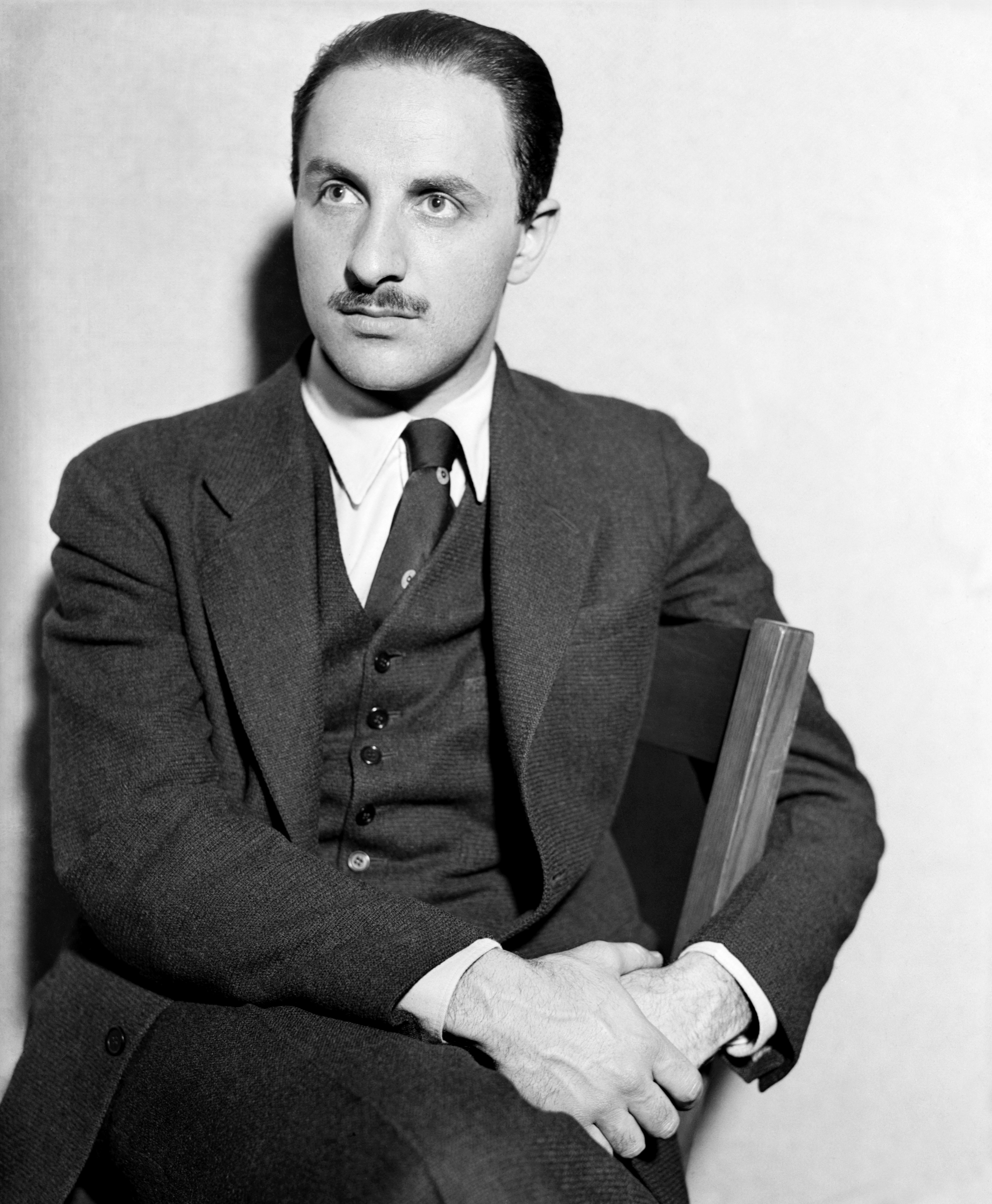
- Blitzstein in 1937
- Librettist: Ronald Jeans
- Language: English
- Premiere: 6 May 1929; The Bellevue-Stratford Hotel Ballroom, Philadelphia

Triple-Sec is an English language American opera in one act composed by Marc Blitzstein with a libretto by Ronald Jeans. The first performance of the comic opera was in 1929 in the composer's hometown of Philadelphia.

Triple-Sec, the composer's first opera, has a running time of fifteen minutes. The opera was Blitzstein's first success as a composer. Blitzstein's biographer Eric Gordon wrote "what gives the piece interest is not its story. Nor is Blitzstein's music inherently so attractive—all conversational recitative with no arias or set pieces, composed on a rakish idiom of tonal ambiguity to a chamber orchestra accompaniment. It is the Dadaist staging that makes the opera work."

Blitzstein told the Daily Worker in 1941 that the opera "was one of those screwy modernist things in which, through stage devices, the audience is supposed to get drunk. It had a philosophy. I was slamming the smug people and traditions I had been brought up with."

== Synopsis ==
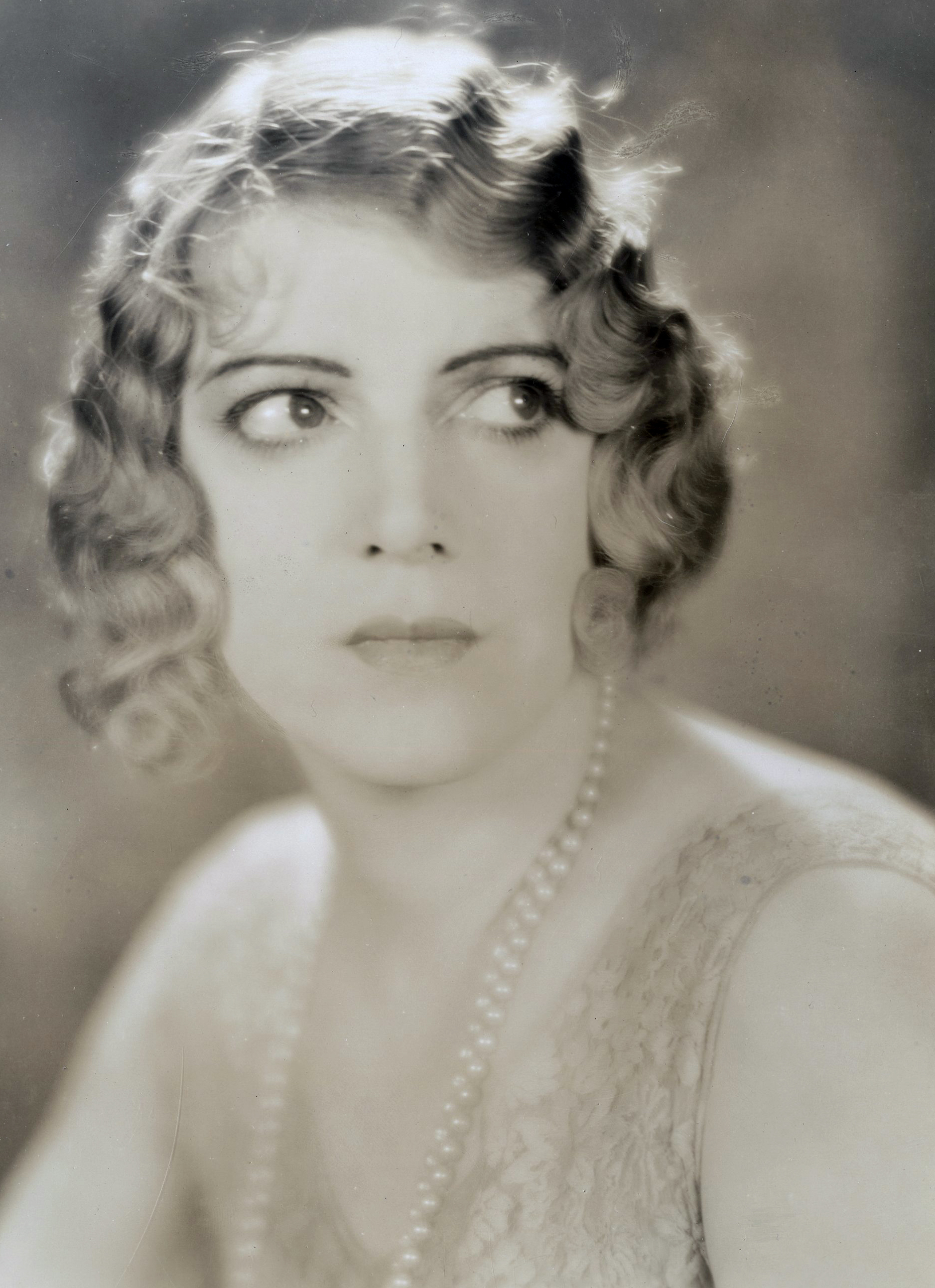
Texas Guinan, model for the Hostess

In a prologue in front of the curtain, the Hostess (modeled on Texas Guinan) introduces the work, speaking to a dinner theater audience that has had too much to drink.

Setting: The library of the townhouse of Lord Rupert Silverside.

Lord Silverside's maid Hopkins and his butler Perkins are discussing the forthcoming wedding of their employer as they tidy up the library. The Stranger appears, wanting to speak to Lord Silverside. The domestics ask the Stranger to leave. Lord Silverside arrives with his fiancée, Lady Betty. The Stranger reveals she is already married to Lord Silverside. Lady Betty faints at this revelation. The opera ends while efforts are made to revive Lady Betty.

== Composition ==
Blitzstein attended a production in Philadelphian of Paul Hindemith's opera Hin und zurück (Back and Forth) in 1928, writing a review of it for Modern Music. Blitzstein modeled Triple-Sec after Hindemith's opera. The opera was written in the summer of 1928 while Blitzstein was resident at the MacDowell Colony in Peterborough, New Hampshire.

"Part way through there are suddenly two of each character. As the vision of the audience becomes more imperfectly focused there are three identical Lady Bettys and three maids named Hopkins. By the time the curtain is ready to fall, there are seven [butlers] named Perkins."

The opera is scored for one violin, one viola, one double bass, two clarinets, one bassoon, one trumpet, one trombone, timpani, snare drum, xylophone, ratchet, bass drum, woodblock, cowbell, tambourine, and piano.

The piano–vocal score was published at Mainz in February 1931 by the German music publisher B. Schott's Söhne. The holographic score is held by the New York Public Library.

== Performances ==
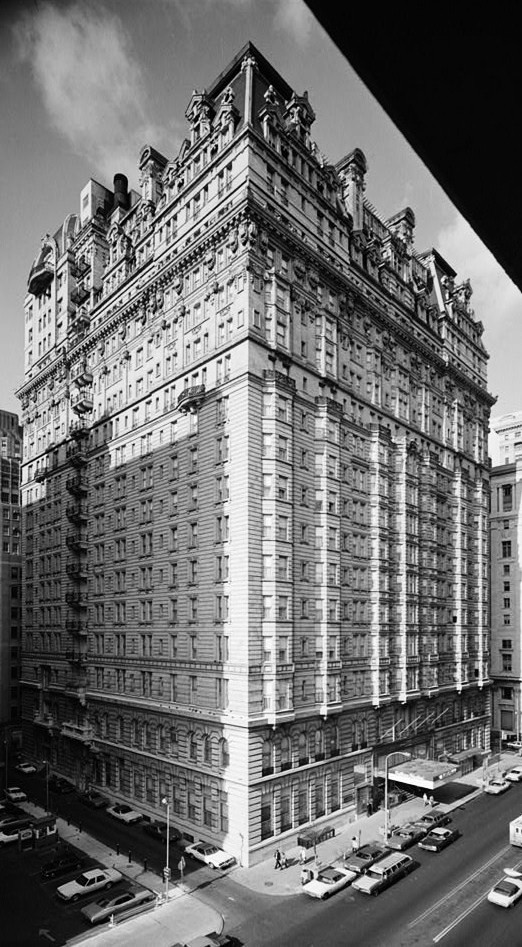
The Bellevue-Stratfird Hotel in 1976

Triple-Sec premiered May 6, 1929, in the ballroom of the Bellevue-Stratford Hotel in Philadelphia, conducted by Alexander Smallens. James Light directed and Louis Simon designed the costumes. Ruth Montague was the Hostess, Ethel Niethammer was Perkins the maid, Ralph Jusko was Hopkins the butler, Maybelle Marston was the Stranger, Albert Mahler was Lord Rupert Silverside, and Irene Williams was Lady Betty. The Society for Contemporary Music sponsored the program, which included Alfredo Casella's Pupazzetti and Arnold Schoenberg's Pierrot lunaire. The Philadelphia Record review said it was "not so funny" (even if the audience laughed) and was "crude . . . its extravagance rather pureile and its origins may be traced to Stravinsky and the Metropolitan's freak opera Jonny spielt auf," which had played at the Met in January 1929. The Musical Leader wrote "the music was extremely successful–vulgar, dissonant, rhythmically effective and well orchestrated. it had just the streak of commonplace American jazz treated with a highly sophisticated modern technic and a successful sense of humor. it demonstrated indisputably the fact that Marc Blitzstein has talent."

While visiting Germany in 1929, his publishers assured him a German production was likely and Blitzstein met with representatives of Darmstadt's opera–but no production occurred in Germany until 2015.

The third version of the revue Garrick Gaieties brought Triple-Sec to Broadway in 1930 as the first segment in the second act. Directed by Philip Loeb, the show opened at the Guild Theatre on June 4. The cast included Ruth Montague as the Hostess, Jane Sherman as Perkins, James Norris as Hopkins, Ray Heatherton as Lord Rupert Silverside, Ruth Chorpenning as the Stranger, and Imogene Coca as the third Lady Betty. Steven Suskin wrote the show ran 170 performances, being "favorably received despite its avant-garde nature"; yet The New Grove Dictionary of Music and Musicians said both the show and the opera were "critical failures." Garrick closed October 8, 1930.

Triple-Sec was revived by Richard Flusser's After Dinner Opera Company on June 7, 1950, at the Master Theatre, Riverside Drive at 103rd Street in New York City. The company's four performances were on a triple bill with Johann Sebastian Bach's Coffee Cantata staged as an opera called Grounds for Divorce and Lukas Foss's opera The Jumping Frog of Calaveras County, which had premiered earlier that year at Indiana University. Musical America said Triple-Sec was "so zestful and so well written that it has not dated at all." Flusser's company then performed Triple-Sec on college campuses.

Triple-Sec was performed at the 1951 Berkshire Music Festival at Tanglewood. The Juilliard Opera Theatre performed the opera the same year. Gustav Meier conducted a performance during the 1958 Berkshire Music Festival as part of an all-Blitzstein program on July 25. The New School's Opera Workshop, directed by Flusser and Emanuel Levenson, presented the opera on May 26, 1967.

The European premiere was in Berlin on March 14, 2015, produced by the Konzerthaus Berlin and the Komische Oper Berlin and given at the Konzerthaus. Evan Christ conducted. The production was part of the Festival Mythos shown on a double-bill with George Gershwin's jazz opera Blue Monday.

The Curtis Institute of Music, Blitzstein's alma mater, on November 11, 2021, gave a performance on a double-bill with Gian Carlo Menotti's 1946 opera The Medium. WHYY-TV's "On Stage with Curtis" broadcast a program about the staging of this production. Curtis again gave the two operas on February 10, 2024. Joseph Mechavich conducted and Alek Shrader directed. In April 2024, the Mannes School of Music at The New School presented Triple-Sec, its inspiration Hin und zurück, and six other short operas at Ernst C. Stiefel Hall in Manhattan.

== Roles ==
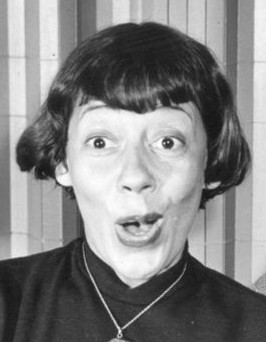
Imogene Coca, one of the Lady Bettys in the 1930 production

Roles, voice types, 1928 Philadelphia premiere, 1930 Broadway
| Role | Voice type | Philadelphia, 1928 Director: James Light Conductor: Alexander Smallens | Broadway, 1930 Director: Philip Loeb Musical Direction: Tom Jones |
|---|---|---|---|
| Hostess | alto | Ruth Montague | Ruth Montague |
| Perkins I (maid) | soprano | Ethel Niethammer | Jane Sherman |
| Hopkins I (butler) | baritone | Ralph Jusko | James Norris |
| Lord Silverside | tenor | Albert Mahler | Ray Heatherton |
| Stranger I | mezzo-soprano | Maybelle Marston | Ruth Chorpenning |
| Lady Betty I | soprano | Irene Williams | Evelyn LaTour |
| Hopkins II | bass-baritone | | Donald Stewart |
| Stranger II | alto | | Velma Vavra |
| Lord Silverside II | tenor | | Ted Fetter |
| Lady Betty II | soprano | | Thelma Tipson |
| Lady Betty III | mezzo-soprano | | Imogene Coca |
