= Anthony Newman =

Anthony Newman may refer to:

- Anthony Newman (American football) (born 1965), retired American football defensive back
- Anthony Newman (musician) (born 1941), American classical musician

== See also ==
- Tony Newman (born 1943), English rock drummer
