= Ernő Balogh =

United States-based Hungarian-born pianist, composer, editor, and teacher

- Born: 4 April 1897; Budapest
- Died: 2 June 1989 (aged 92) Mitchellville, Maryland

Ernő Balogh (4 April 1897, Budapest – died 2 June 1989, Mitchellville, Maryland) was a United States–based Hungarian-born pianist, composer, editor, and teacher.

== Biography ==
Balogh attended the Budapest Conservatory from 1905 to 1917. His teachers included Béla Bartók for piano and Zoltán Kodály for composition, the two subjects in which he won the Franz Liszt Prize. Balogh became close friends with both men. In 1927, he arranged for Bartók to make his first concert tour in the United States.

After completing his course at the Budapest Conservatory and further piano studies with Leonid Kreutzer at the Berlin Conservatory, Balogh moved to the United States in 1924. Settling in New York, he established a successful career as both soloist and accompanist; in the latter capacity, he played with musicians including Fritz Kreisler, Lotte Lehmann, and Grace Moore.

== Personal life ==
In 1936, Balogh married Malvina Schweizer, who took a professorship of biology at New York University. They continued to live in New York until 1960, when they moved to Washington, D.C. pursuant to Balogh's acceptance of a position teaching at the Peabody Conservatory in Baltimore, Maryland.

== Partial discography ==
- Frédéric Chopin – Four Impromptus (Op. 29, Op. 36, Op. 51, Fantaisie-Impromptu Op. 66) / Boléro / Berceuse (Op. 57) / Tarantelle (Op. 43) / Barcarolle (Op. 60) – Lyrichord LP LL 20 (1950's) – Ernő Balogh at the Steinway piano
