= Aurand Harris =

American children's playwright (1915–1996)

- Born: July 4, 1915; Jamesport, Missouri, U.S.
- Died: May 6, 1996 (aged 80); New York City, U.S.
- Occupation: Playwright
- Awards: Medallion of the Children's Theatre Foundation of America (1993); National Endowment for the Arts Creative Writing Fellowship in Children's Theatre (1976); Charlotte B. Chorpenning Award, American Alliance for Theatre and Education (1967; 1985)

Aurand Harris (July 4, 1915 – May 6, 1996) was an American children's playwright. His 36 plays for children have received more than 30,000 performances. Some notable works include The Arkansaw Bear, Androcles and the Lion, Rags to Riches, The Toby Show, Monkey Magic, Pinballs, and The Orphan Train.

In 1939, Harris began a teaching career at a public school in Gary, Indiana. Two years later, he became the head of the drama department at William Woods College in Fulton, Missouri. He pursued further studies in playwriting in New York City - writing for theatre while teaching at Grace Episcopal Church School in Manhattan.

Over six decades, he wrote more than 36 plays, some of which continue to be produced in children's theatre. He received an honorary doctorate from Indiana University and was the first playwright to receive the Medallion of the Children's Theatre Foundation of America.

Harris died on May 6, 1996, in Manhattan and is buried in the family plot in Jamesport, Missouri.

== Early life ==
James Aurand Harris was born on July 4, 1915, in Jamesport, Missouri to Dr. George Dowe Harris, a physician and Myrtle Sebastian, a graduate of Northwestern University. Sebastian was trained in theater and speech, and was an active director, teacher, and amateur actor who maintained a studio. She introduced Harris to theatre.

Harris's acting began at age four when he played a bumblebee in a local musical production; before seven, he had written his first short dramatic piece. In high school, he participated in dramatic and oratorical contests and was reported to have received state-level recognition as both an actor and an orator.

== Education ==
In 1936, he earned a Bachelor of Arts from the University of Kansas City. In 1939, he received a Master of Arts from Northwestern University in Evanston, Illinois, where he worked with Winifred Ward, a pioneer in children's theatre. He pursued postgraduate studies at Columbia University in 1947. In 1991, he received an honorary Doctor of Humane Letters from Indiana University. The university's 15th president, Thomas Ehrlich, presented the degree.

Harris began his teaching career in September 1939 at Horace Mann High School in Gary, Indiana, as a studio teacher of dramatics, and taught there for two years. In September 1941, he became head of the drama department at William Woods College in Fulton, Missouri. In 1946, he moved to New York City to study writing for the theatre and simultaneously began teaching at Grace Episcopal Church School in Manhattan, where he remained for 33 years.

Although Harris initially pursued adult theater, he shifted his focus to children's playwriting following challenges in the adult theater domain, building upon his earlier successes in writing plays for young audiences.

== Notable works ==
Aurand Harris's first play was Once Upon a Clothesline, the first production of which was presented by the Campus Players of William Woods College under Harris's direction. Soon after, Once Upon a Clothesline won a prize in the Second Annual Seattle Junior Programs Playwriting Contest. That production featured the intermediate group of sixth-, seventh-, and eighth-grade students from the 1951 Seattle Summer Theatre Workshop, and the play later toured playgrounds throughout the city. The play was also performed on July 27–28, 1951, at the San Diego Junior Theatre, directed by Signe Culbertson and assisted by James Sams.

In 1964 Aurand Harris wrote Androcles and the Lion, which uses the style of commedia dell'arte to retell one of Aesop's fables. By 1989, it had been translated into nine languages.

In 1976 Harris became the first children's playwright to receive a National Endowment for the Arts Creative Writing Fellowship. In 1985 he was inducted into the College of Fellows of the American Theatre in a ceremony at the Kennedy Center in Washington. In 1988 he directed one of his plays at the Shanghai Children's Art Theatre. It was the first time a Western children's play had been performed for Chinese children.

Harris also edited several anthologies of plays for children and adolescents. These include Short Plays of Theatre Classics and Plays Children Love: A Treasury of Contemporary and Classic Plays for Children (with Coleman A. Jennings). His plays were also collected in Six Plays for Children, edited by Coleman A. Jennings.

Aurand Harris died of cancer in May 1996 in New York City, leaving his estate to theatre organizations.

== Honors and awards ==
- 1967: Charlotte B. Chorpenning Playwright Award, American Alliance for Theatre and Education
- 1976: First Recipient of the National Endowment for the Arts Creative Writing Fellowship in Children's Theatre
- 1985: Charlotte B. Chorpenning Playwright Award, American Alliance for Theatre and Education (AATE)
- 1985: Inducted into the College of Fellows of the American Theatre, presented at the Kennedy Center, Washington, D.C.
- 1991: Recipient of the Distinguished Play Award, American Alliance for Theatre and Education (AATE), for Monkey Magic: Chinese Story Theatre, by Aurand Harris, published by Anchorage Press
- 1991: Honorary Doctorate of Letters, Indiana University, Indianapolis, May 12, 1991
- 1993: Medallion, Children's Theatre Foundation of America (now called the Orlin Corey Medallion)
- 1993: Recipient of the Distinguished Play Award, American Alliance for Theatre and Education (AATE), for The Pinballs, Adapted by Aurand Harris from the award-winning novel by Betsy Byar, published by Anchorage Press
- 1996: Recipient of the Distinguished Play Award, American Alliance for Theatre and Education (AATE), for The Prince and the Pauper, Adapted for the Stage by Aurand Harris, published by Anchorage Press

== Plays/Works ==
- Once Upon a Clothesline, Row-Peterson & Company, now Samuel French, Inc. (1945). First performed by the College Players of William Woods College, Fulton, Missouri, in December 1943 and directed by Aurand Harris.
- Ladies of the Mop, Baker's Plays, Samuel French, Inc. (1945).
- The Moon Makes Three, Samuel French, Inc. (1947).
- Madam Ada, Samuel French, Inc. (1948).
- Seven League Boots, Baker's Plays (1948).
- The Doughnut Hole, Samuel French, Inc. (1948).
- Missouri Mural, Unpublished, (1948).
- Circus Day: A Play in Four Scenes, Samuel French, Inc. (1949)
- Lo and Behold, Unpublished (1949).
- Junket (No Dogs Allowed), Children's Theatre Press (now Anchorage Press) (1949). Adapted by Aurand Harris from the novel by Anne H. White.
- Pinocchio and the Indians, Samuel French, Inc. (1950). A dramatization suggested by Pinocchio in Africa by Cherubini.
- And Never Been Kissed, Samuel French, Inc. (1950). A musical play based on a 1949 novel by Sylvia Dee (pen name for songwriter Josephine Moore Proffitt), which was adapted by Aurand Harris into a comic television drama for the Philco Television Playhouse, and as a stage play the following year.
- Young Alec, Unpublished, (1950).
- Simple Simon (or Simon Big-Ears), Children's Theatre Press (now Anchorage Press) (1953) Adapted by Aurand Harris. Premiered in Washington, D.C., in 1952.
- We Were Young That Year (A Play), Samuel French, Inc. (1954).
- Buffalo Bill, Anchorage Press (1954). Adapted by Aurand Harris. Premiered in Seattle, Washington, 1953.
- Hide and Seek, Unpublished (1955).
- The Plain Princess, Anchorage Press, (1955). Adapted by Aurand Harris from the book by Phyllis McGinley.
- The Flying Prince, Anchorage Press (1958). Based on stories told by Vikramaditya of Ujjain, a Hero of India.
- Circus in the Wind (revised edition of Circus Days), Samuel French, Inc. (1960)
- Pocahontas, Anchorage Press (1961). Playscript developed from history by Aurand Harris.
- The Brave Little Tailor, Anchorage Press (1961). Dramatised by Aurand Harris based on the Brothers Grimm Fairy Tale.
- Androcles and the Lion, Anchorage Press (1964)
- Rags to Riches, Anchorage Press (1966). Playscript developed by Aurand Harris from stories by Horatio Alger. Musical score by Glenn Mack.
- Pinocchio and the Fire-Eater, McGraw-Hill (1967). Premiered in Gary, Indiana Public School, Indiana 1940. Directed by Aurand Harris.
- A Doctor In Spite of Himself, Anchorage Press (1968). Adapted by Aurand Harris from Molière.
- Punch and Judy: The Musical, Anchorage Press (1970)
- Just So Stories, Anchorage Press, (1971). Adapted by Aurand Harris from three of Rudyard Kipling's Just So Stories.
- Ming Lee and the Magic Tree, Samuel French, Inc (1973)
- Peck's Bad Boys, Anchorage Press (1974). Adapted by Aurand Harris based on stories by George Wilbur Peck. Premiered at the Harwich Junior Theatre, West Harwich, Massachusetts, on 24 July 1973 and directed by Aurand Harris.
- Star-Spangled Salute: A Patriotic Musical with Traditional American Songs, Anchorage Press (1974). Premiered at the Harwich Junior Theatre, West Harwich, Massachusetts, in the summer of 1974.
- Robin Goodfellow, Anchorage Press (1976). Adapted from English Folk tales and Shakespeare's "A Midsummer Night's Dream." First produced at the Harwich Junior Theatre, West Harwich, Massachusetts, in the summer of 1975 and directed by Aurand Harris.
- Simple Simon, Anchorage Press (1976)
- Yankee Doodle Dandies, Anchorage Press (1976). Three Scenes from Yankee Doodle Dandy.
- A Toby Show, Anchorage Press (1978)
- Ralph Roister Doister (One-Act Play), Baker's Plays, Samuel French, Inc. (1979). Based on the 16th-century play by Nicholas Udall.
- Edmond Rostand's Cyrano de Bergerac(One-Act Play), Baker's Plays, Samuel French, Inc. (1979). Adapted and abridged as a one-act play, based on the novel written by Edmund Rostand.
- The Romancers (One-Act Play), Baker's Plays, Samuel French, Inc. (1979) Adapted and abridged as a one-act play, based on the work written by Edmund Rostand.
- Fashion (A Play in One-Act), Baker's Plays, Samuel French, Inc. (1979) Adapted and abridged as a one-act play, based on the novel by Anna Cora Mowatt.
- George Bernard Shaw's Classic Candida: a Pleasant Play (One-Act Play), Baker's Plays, Samuel French, Inc. (1979). Adapted and abridged as a one-act play by Aurand Harris based on the play by George Bernard Shaw.
- Arkansaw Bear, Anchorage Press (1980). Premiered March 20–29, 1980, at the University of Texas, Austin.
- Treasure Island, Anchorage Press (1983), Adapted from the novel by Robert Louis Stevenson.
- The Magician's Nephew: A Musical for the Young, Dramatic Publishing (1984). Adapted from the book by C.S. Lewis.
- Ride a Blue Horse, Anchorage Press (1986). From the life and works of James Whitcomb Riley.
- Huck Finn's Story, Anchorage Press (1987). Based on selected scenes from Mark Twain's The Adventures of Huckleberry Finn.
- Monkey Magic: Chinese Story Theater, Anchorage Press (1990). Winner of the 1991 AATE Distinguished Play Award.
- The Importance of Being Earnest, Anchorage Press (1991). Adapted from the play by Oscar Wilde.
- The Tricks of Scapin, Anchorage Press (1991). Adapted from the play by Molière.
- She Stoops to Conquer, Anchorage Press, (1991). Adapted from the play by Oliver Goldsmith.
- The Pinballs, Anchorage Press (1992). Adapted from the award-winning novel by Betsy Cromer Byars. Premiered at Northwestern University Department of Drama. Winner of the 1993 AATE Distinguished Play Award.
- Steal Away Home, Anchorage Press (1992). Adapted from the novel by Jane Kristof, music by Carolyn Geer.
- The Second Shepherd's Play, Anchorage Press (1993). Adapted from the medieval play Secunda Pastorum.
- Peter Rabbit and Me, Anchorage Press (1994). A dramatization of Beatrix Potter's The Tale of Peter Rabbit.
- The Prince and the Pauper, Anchorage Press (1995). Based on the story by Mark Twain. Music by Steve Wheaton. Winner of the 1996 AATE Distinguished Play Award.
- The Orphan Train, Anchorage Press (1998). Premiered at Northwestern University in Evanston, Illinois.
- A Midsummer Night's Dream, Dramatic Publishing Company. Adapted from the play by William Shakespeare.

== Legacy ==
Aurand Harris is commemorated through grants and fellowships and the Aurand Harris Memorial Playw

Harris left his author royalties to the Children's Theatre Foundation of America. The Aurand Harris Grants and Fellowships “seek to inspire and challenge theatre for young audiences and individual artists, to develop quality ideas and new opportunities in theatre for young audiences, as well as promote live theatre experiences of high integrity for young people throughout the nation by supporting both individual theatre artists seeking to deepen and expand artistic capacities and opportunities through fellowship funding and by supporting theatre for young audience companies seeking to bring engaging live theatre to their respective communities.”

The New England Theatre Conference established the Aurand Harris Memorial Playwriting Award in 1997 to honour Harris for his lifetime dedication to professional theatre for young audiences.
