= Maybelle Marston =

American opera singer

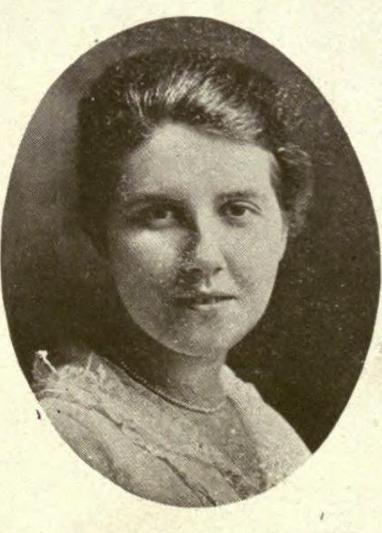
- Maybelle Zenobia Berretta, from a 1916 publication.
- Born: Mabel Zenobia Berretta; May 14, 1895; Philadelphia
- Died: February 22, 1983 (aged 87)
- Occupation: Opera singer

Maybelle Zenobia Berretta Marston (May 14, 1895 – February 22, 1983) was an American contralto singer from Philadelphia, Pennsylvania.

== Early life ==
Mabel Zenobia Berretta was from Philadelphia. She won a "cutest baby" contest at the New Jersey shore in 1896.

== Career ==
Maybelle Beretta Marston sang with the Philadelphia Civic Opera Company, at the Philadelphia Academy of Music and other large venues. In 1925 Marston sang Gilbert and Sullivan roles in H.M.S. Pinafore (1925) The Mikado (1926 and 1941), and Iolanthe (1927). She also sang parts in Feuersnot (1927, its U.S. premiere), Die Walküre (1928 and 1929), I gioielli della Madonna (1928), Ariadne auf Naxos (1928, its U.S. premiere), Die Meistersinger von Nürnberg (1928 and 1930), Cavalleria rusticana (1928), Le Chemineau (1929), Carmen (1929), Prince Igor (1929), Roméo et Juliette (1929), Das Rheingold (1929), Götterdämmerung (1930), Die Zauberflöte (1930), Le nozze di Figaro (1930), Robin Hood (1932), Hänsel und Gretel (1935), Rigoletto (1938), all in Philadelphia. She and other Philadelphia Civic Opera singers appeared in Marc Blitzstein's Triple-Sec (1929) in a show for the Society for Contemporary Music. In 1932 she sang as a soloist in a performance of Henry Kimball Hadley's A New Earth.

Other appearances by Marston included The Pirates of Penzance (1923), a 1927 concert with the Reading Choral Society, where she shared soloist billing with Nelson Eddy, and a 1930 production of The Chimes of Normandy with the Community Music Club of Collingswood, New Jersey.

Marston was in demand as an oratorio and cantata soloist, gave recitals, sang on radio broadcasts, and taught music later in her career; she also directed the chorus of the Women's Club of Ardmore, Pennsylvania, and the Alumnae Choral Club of William Penn High School for Girls.

== Personal life ==
Maybelle Berretta married a Philadelphia attorney named M. Randall Marston in 1917. She had a son, M. Randall Marston Jr., born in 1918. In 1934 she had another son, after an affair with singer Nelson Eddy; the child was raised by adoptive parents to protect Marston's and Eddy's reputations. Maybelle Berretta Marston died in 1983, aged 87 years.
