= Berenice (opera) =

1737 opera by George Frideric Handel

George Frideric Handel

Berenice (HWV 38) is an opera in three acts by George Frideric Handel to a 1709 Antonio Salvi libretto, Berenice, regina d'Egitto, or Berenice, Queen of Egypt. Handel began the music in December 1736; the premiere took place at Covent Garden Theatre in London on 18 May 1737 — but was unsuccessful, with just three further performances. Set circa 81 B.C., Berenice traces the life of Berenice III of Egypt, daughter of Ptolemy IX, the main character in another Handel opera, Tolomeo.

== Background ==
The German-born Handel, after spending some of his early career composing operas and other pieces in Italy, settled in London, where in 1711 he had brought Italian opera for the first time with his opera Rinaldo. An enormous success, Rinaldo created a craze in London for Italian opera seria, a form focused overwhelmingly on solo arias for the star virtuoso singers.

Handel had presented new operas in London for years with great success. One of the major attractions in Handel's operas was the star castrato Senesino, whose relationship with the composer was often stormy and who eventually left Handel's company to appear with the rival Opera of the Nobility, set up in 1733. Handel moved to a different theatre, Covent Garden, and engaged different singers, but there were neither sufficient audience for opera in London nor aristocratic supporters to back two opera houses at once, and both opera companies found themselves in difficulty. None of Handel's three new operas in the 1736–37 season repeated the success of his earlier works, and he suffered a breakdown in his health, as reported by his friend Lord Shaftesbury:

"Great fatigue and disappointment, affected him so much, that he was this Spring struck with the Palsy, which took entirely away, the use of 4 fingers of his right hand; and totally disabled him from Playing: And when the heats of the Summer 1737 came on, the Disorder seemed at times to affect his Understanding."

Although not performed again in Handel's lifetime nor for many years afterwards, with the revival of interest in Baroque music and historically informed musical performance since the 1960s, Berenice, like all Handel operas, is performed at festivals and opera houses today. Among other performances, in 2011 Berenice was performed at the Theater an der Wien and at the Linbury Studio Theatre (a performance space within the Royal Opera, Covent Garden) in 2019.

== Roles ==
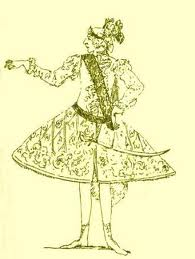
Caricature of Gizziello, creator of the role of Alessandro

Roles, voice types, and premiere cast
Role	Voice type	Premiere Cast, 18 May 1737
Berenice, Queen of Egypt	soprano	Anna Maria Strada del Pò
Selene, her sister	contralto	Francesca Bertolli
Alessandro, a Roman nobleman	soprano castrato	Gioacchino Conti ("Gizziello")
Demetrio, a prince	alto castrato	Domenico Annibali
Arsace, another prince	contralto	Maria Caterina Negri
Fabio, Roman messenger	tenor	John Beard
Aristobolo, captain	basso	Henry Reinhold

== Synopsis ==
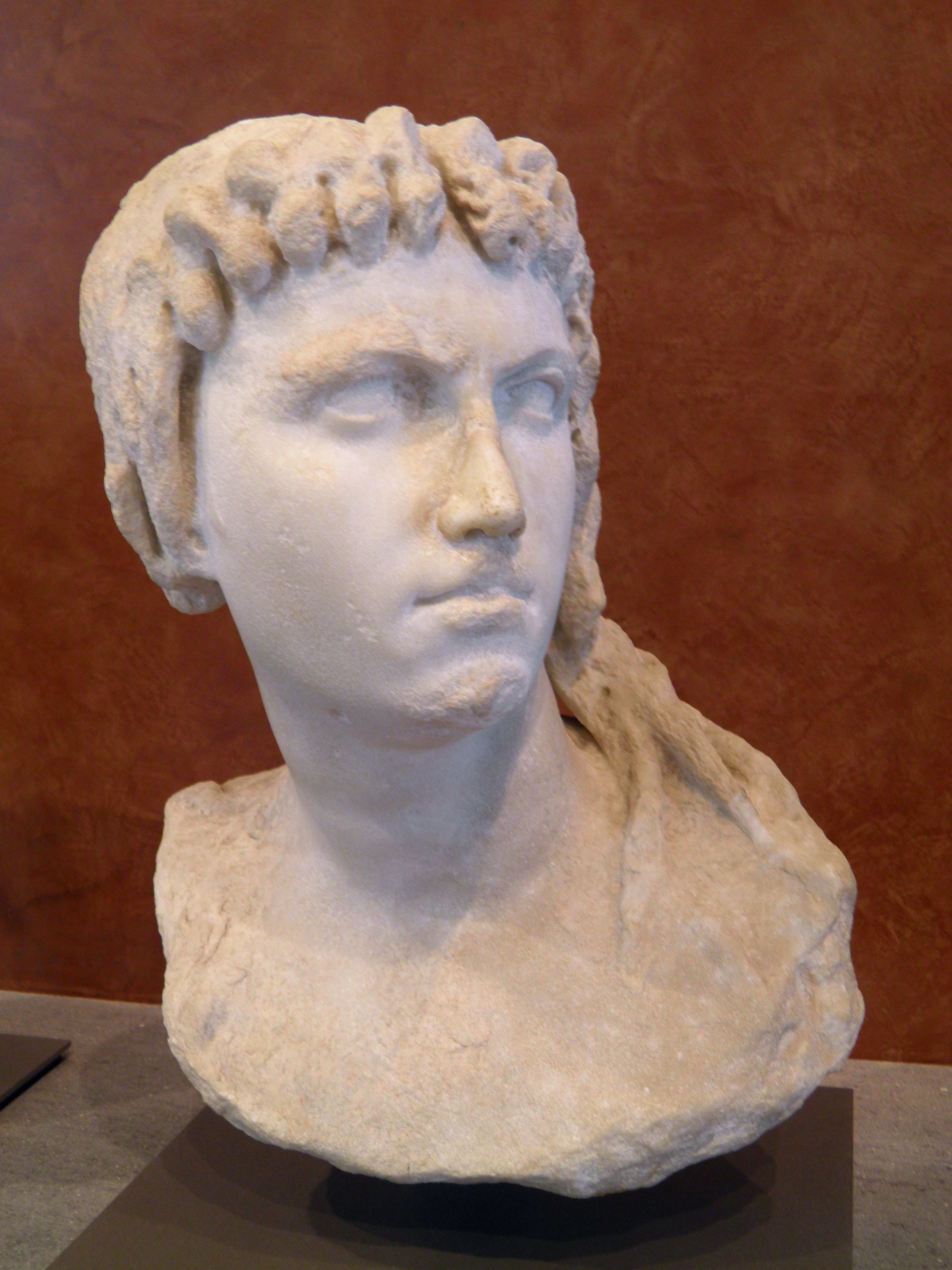
Head of a statuette which may be of Berenice, subject of Handel's opera

=== Act 1 ===
The scene is Egypt, around 80 BC. The Queen, Berenice, has for some time been in love with a prince of Macedonia, Demetrio, but has been advised that for the good of her country she must form an alliance with Rome through marriage, and she has reluctantly consented to set aside personal feeling for duty. Demetrio is an ally of the enemy of Egypt, Mithridates of Pontus. Fabio, the Roman ambassador, presents the Queen with the man chosen by them to be her husband, Prince Alessandro of Rome. Alessandro falls madly in love with Berenice at first sight, but she is not as impressed with him and resents having a husband forced on her in this way. Fabio tells Alessandro that if Berenice refuses to marry him, he must wed her sister Princess Selene, instead.

Unbeknownst to the Queen, however, the man she loves, Demetrio, and her sister Selene are secretly in love with each other. Moreover, they are plotting to call Mithridates to their aid to overthrow Berenice and put Selene on the throne in her place. Berenice tells her sister that she must marry Prince Arsace (who in fact is in love with Selene, but not she with him). Alessandro saves Demetrio from an assassination attempt in the royal palace, whereupon Berenice resolves more than ever that Demetrio is the man for her.

=== Act 2 ===
Rome continues to press for Alessandro to marry Selene now that Berenice has refused him, but the Queen insists this is impossible, since Selene is now betrothed to Arsace. Berenice is warned this will mean war with Rome. Selene explains to Demetrio that she has no desire to wed Arsace but has no choice in the matter. Demetrio wants to kill Arsace in revenge. Arsace offers to yield Selene to Alessandro to avert war, but Alessandro has no interest in marrying anyone but his beloved Berenice. The Queen overhears the man she loves, Demetrio, ranting and raving to his sweetheart, her sister Selene, about how he never cared a bit for the Queen and in fact is plotting her overthrow, and Berenice orders Demetrio thrown into the dungeon.

=== Act 3 ===
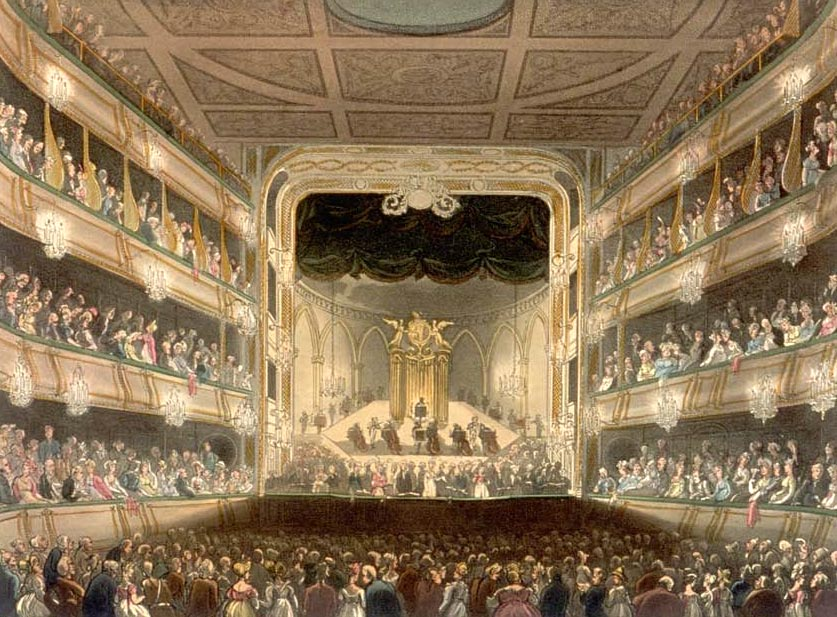
Interior of the first Theatre Royal at Covent Garden where Berenice was first performed

Queen Berenice, utterly distraught with the knowledge that the man of her heart, Demetrio, never cared anything for her and is a traitor to boot, declares to the Roman envoy Fabio that she no longer cares whom she marries. She takes a ring off her finger and gives it to him, telling Fabio to give the ring to his choice, and whoever returns it to her will be the man she will wed. Fabio bestows the ring on Alessandro. Selene is desperate for Demetrio to be released from the dungeon and promises to Arsace she will marry him if only he can release Demetrio. Alessandro agrees to Arsace's request to help in the release of Demetrio, and Arsace determines to try to convince the Queen of Alessandro's sincere love for her. Berenice, however, is still furious and in emotional turmoil. She orders Demetrio to be decapitated and his severed head presented to her after which she plans to commit suicide. Selene pleads with her sister for mercy for Demetrio, a petition Alessandro and Arsace also urge to the Queen. Alessandro admits that he was given Berenice's ring by Fabio, but does not want to use it to claim the Queen's hand as he wants her to love him for himself. On hearing this, Berenice is touched and decides that she really does love Alessandro after all. She orders Demetrio released from the dungeon and forgives him, allowing him to marry Selene, while she will wed Alessandro.

== Musical features ==
The work is restrained in its scoring, being composed only for strings, oboes, and basso continuo. Despite the few performances Berenice received, the slow section from the overture, which became known as "The Minuet from Berenice", achieved popularity outside the context of the opera, as did the aria for Demetrio in Act Two, "Si, tra i ceppi". Handel used the theme of the sinfonia that opens Act 3 in the overture to Music for the Royal Fireworks.

== Recordings ==
- In 1995, Newport Classic released a first recording on compact disc (CD), with Julianne Baird (soprano), Jan Opalach (bass), D'Anna Fortunato (mezzo-soprano), and Drew Minter (countertenor), with the Brewer Baroque Chamber Orchestra conducted by Rudolph Palmer.
- In 2010, Virgin Classics released a studio recording with the Complesso Barocco conducted by Alan Curtis, and Klara Ek, Ingela Bohlin, Franco Fagioli, Romina Basso, Mary-Ellen Nesi, and Vito Priante.

== Bibliography ==
- Dean, Winton (2006). Handel's Operas, 1726-1741. Boydell Press. ISBN 1-84383-268-2. The second of the two-volume definitive reference on the operas of Handel.
