= Manhattan Chamber Orchestra =

Chamber orchestra in Manhattan, New York City

- Chamber orchestra
- Founded: 1987, by Richard Auldon Clark
- Location: Manhattan, New York City, U.S.
- Principal conductor: Richard Auldon Clark
- Music director: Richard Auldon Clark

The Manhattan Chamber Orchestra is a chamber orchestra based in Manhattan.

== History ==
The orchestra was founded in 1987 by Richard Auldon Clark, who remains the artistic director and conductor. The orchestra performs music of all genres with a special focus on contemporary music by American composers. It performs an average of eight concerts per season in New York City, as well as tours.

== Activities ==
The Manhattan Chamber Orchestra has premiered and/or recorded the music of William Grant Still, Alec Wilder, Victor Herbert, John Rutter, Henry Cowell, Alan Hovhaness, Otto Luening, Dominick Argento, Randall Thompson, Eric Ewazen, David Amram, and Dave Soldier.

The orchestra has released 30 CDs on the Newport Classic, Koch International, Avant, Vox, Helicon, Kleos Classics, and Mulatta labels. It records an average of three new CDs per year.
