= One voice per part =

Practice of performing choral music with a single voice on each vocal line

In music, one voice per part or one vocalist per part (OVPP) is the practice of performing choral music with a single voice on each vocal line. In the specific context of Johann Sebastian Bach's works, it is also known as the Rifkin hypothesis, as set forth in a 1982 article by Joshua Rifkin and expanded in Andrew Parrott's book The Essential Bach Choir. Choral works featuring SATB (soprano, alto, tenor and bass) vocal parts are consequently sung by only four singers when this approach is adopted.

The first conductor to strongly advocate this approach to the music of Bach was the American pianist and conductor Joshua Rifkin in the 1980s. The use of solo voices in the choral music of Bach has also found champions in Andrew Parrott, Paul McCreesh, Sigiswald Kuijken and Konrad Junghänel.

The approach is still somewhat controversial and recordings of Bach's music featuring solo voices in choral movements have met with mixed reviews. Proponents cite the fact that there are rarely additional copies of the vocal parts. Furthermore, the presence, absence and omission of solo and tutti markings in scores, as well as the ambiguity in their meaning, bring further doubt to the question of whether Bach used more than one singer per part or not.

The initialism OVPP was coined in the Internet mailing list "The Bach Recordings Discussion Group" in the mid 1990s by Steven Langley Guy. The initialism seems to have been adopted more widely since that time.

== Sources ==
- Rifkin, Joshua. 1982. “Bach's Chorus: A Preliminary Report”. The Musical Times 123 (1677). Musical Times Publications Ltd.: 747–54. doi:10.2307/961592.
