= Anthony Newman (musician) =

American classical musician (born 1941)

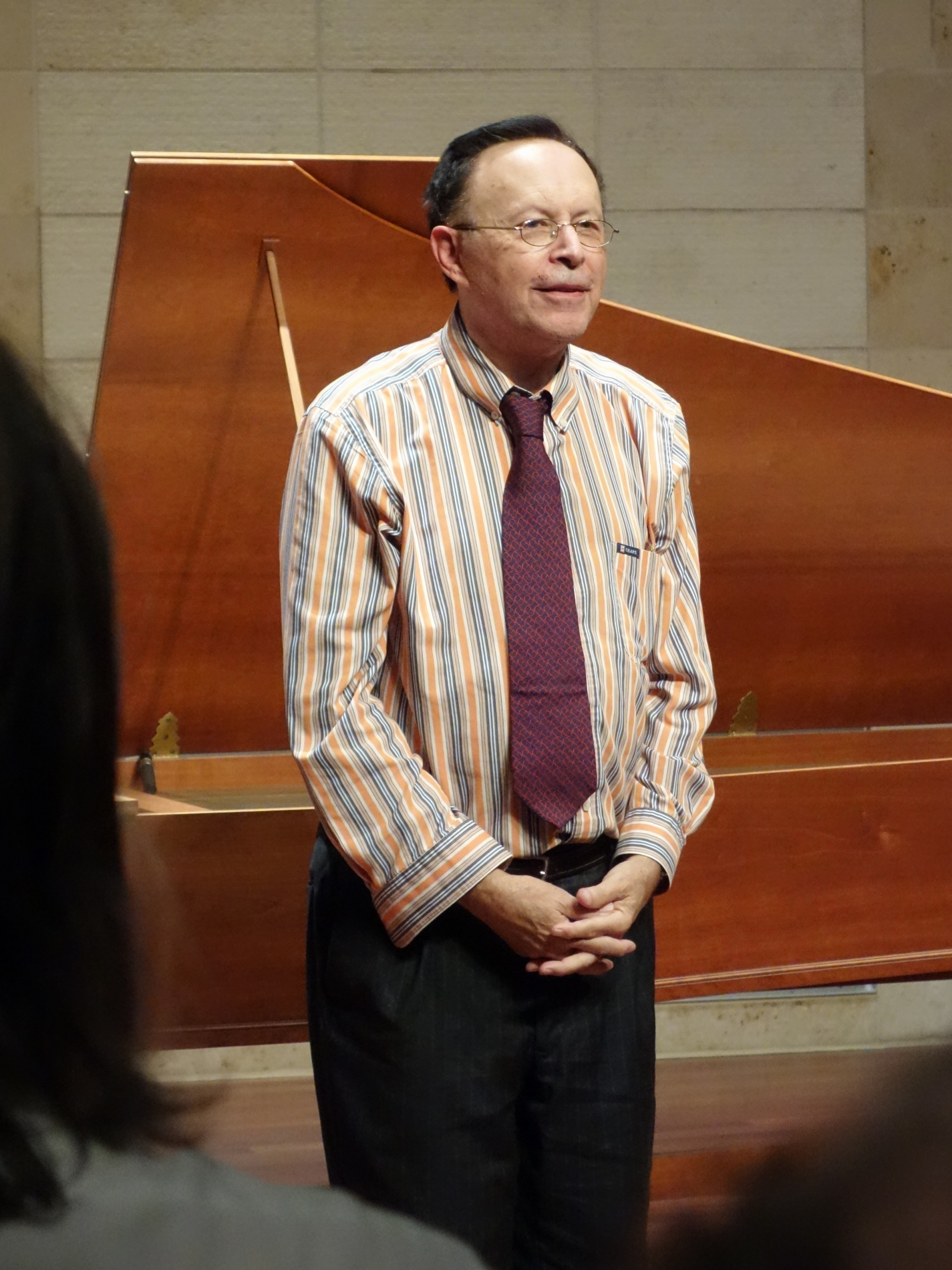
Newman at the San Francisco Conservatory of Music in September 2012

Anthony Newman (born May 12, 1941) is an American classical musician. While mostly known as an organist, Newman is also a harpsichordist (including the pedal harpsichord), pianist, composer, conductor, writer, and teacher. He is a specialist in music of the Baroque period, particularly the works of Johann Sebastian Bach, and has collaborated with such noted musicians as Kathleen Battle, Julius Baker, Itzhak Perlman, Eugenia Zukerman, Jean-Pierre Rampal, Leonard Bernstein, Michala Petri, and Wynton Marsalis, for whom he arranged and conducted In Gabriel’s Garden, the most popular classical record of 1996.

== Early life ==
Newman was born in Los Angeles, California. His father was a lawyer, and his mother was a professional dancer and an amateur pianist. Early in life he was "delighted, elated and fascinated" with the music of Bach. From the age of ten to seventeen he studied the organ with Richard Keys Biggs.

At age seventeen Newman went to Paris, France, to study at the École Normale de Musique, where he received a diplôme supérieur.

Newman returned to the United States and received a B.S. in 1963 from the Mannes School of Music having studied organ with Edgar Hilliar, piano with Edith Oppens and composition with William Sydemann. He worked as a teaching fellow at Boston University while studying composition with Leon Kirchner at Harvard University. He received his M.A. in composition from Harvard in 1966 and his doctorate in organ from Boston University in 1967 where he studied organ with George Faxon and composition with Gardner Read and Luciano Berio for whom he also served as teaching assistant.

== Professional life ==
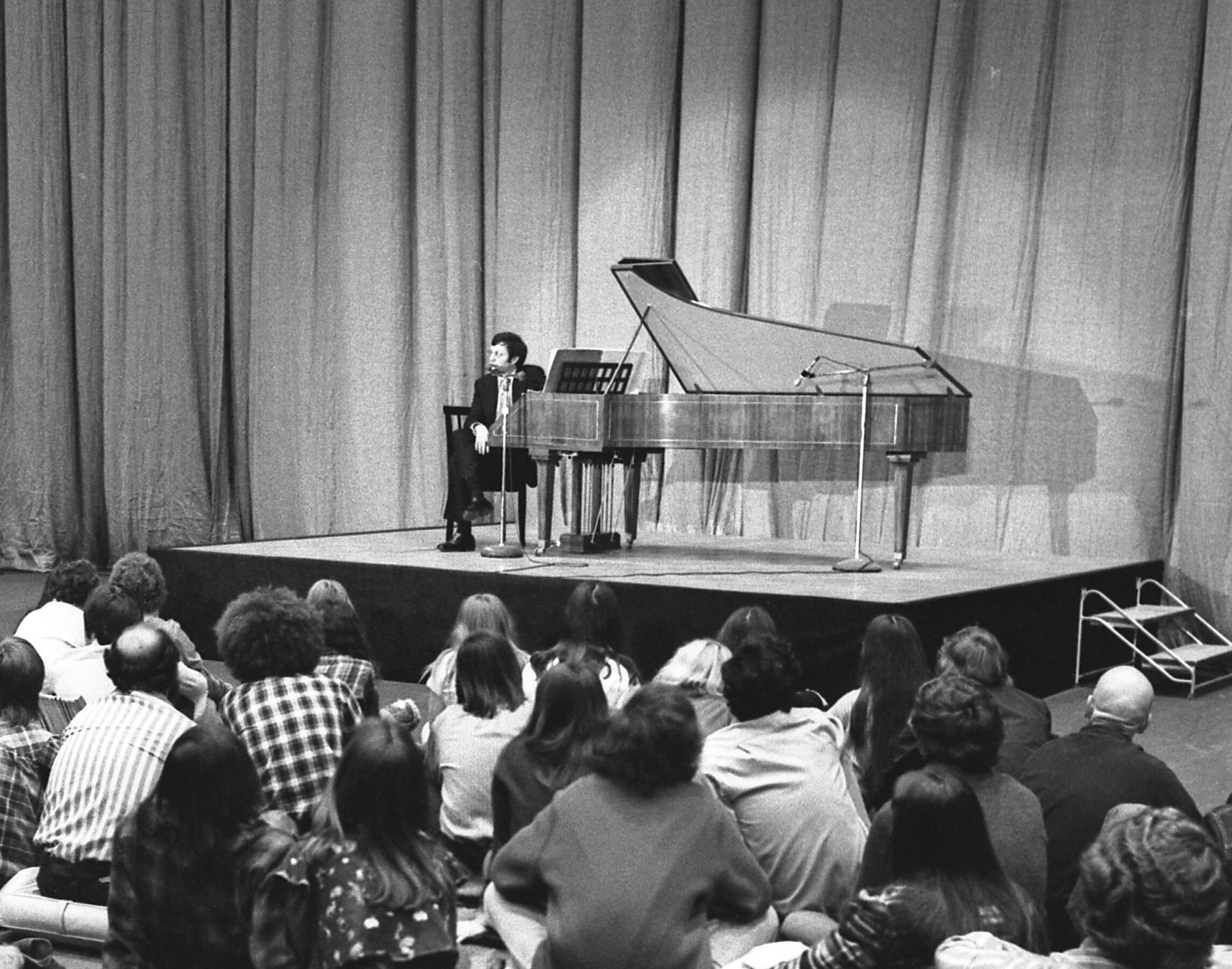
Newman taking questions after a performance at UCLA, 1973.

Newman's professional debut, in which he played Bach organ works on the pedal harpsichord, took place at the Carnegie Recital Hall in New York in 1967. Of this performance The New York Times wrote, "His driving rhythms and formidable technical mastery...and intellectually cool understanding of the structures moved his audience to cheers at the endings." Newman also drew young audiences, as noted by Time magazine in a 1971 article in which they dubbed him the "high priest of the harpsichord." Newman has gone on to make solo recordings for a variety of labels including Digitech, Excelsior, Helicon, Infinity Digital/Sony, Moss Music Group/Vox, Newport Classic, Second Hearing, Sheffield, Sine Qua Non, Sony, Deutsche Grammophon, and 903 Records. Newman has recorded most of Bach's keyboard works on organ, harpsichord and piano as well as recording works of Scarlatti, Handel, and Couperin. On the fortepiano he has recorded the works of Beethoven and Mozart. As a conductor Newman has led international orchestras such as the Madeira Festival Orchestra, the Brandenburg Collegium, and the English Chamber Orchestra.

For thirty years, starting in 1968, while Newman continued to record, concertize, compose, conduct and write, he taught music at The Juilliard School, Indiana University, and State University of New York at Purchase.

Although initially intensely interested in composition, he became discouraged by the non-tonal music that was the focus of conservatory composition departments in the 1950s and '60s. He returned to composition in the 1980s, and has written music for a range of instruments including organ, harpsichord, orchestra, guitar, violin, cello, flute chamber ensemble, piano, choral music and opera. In 2011, Newman released a 20-CD set of his compositions on 903 Records.

Newman is music director of Bach Works and Bedford Chamber Concerts and is on the board of Musical Quarterly magazine. He is also music director at St. Matthew's Church, Bedford New York.

== Personal life ==
Newman married fellow conductor and organist Mary Jane Newman in 1968. They have three sons.

== Discography ==
Note: * indicates Newman's composition

903 Records

- J.S. Bach: Six Partitas
- J.S. Bach: Well Tempered Clavier Book 2, 1742
- J.S. Bach: Works for Pedal Harpsichord and Organ, 230
- J.S. Bach: Inventions in 2 Parts and Sinfonias in 3 Parts
- J.S. Bach: Great Works for Organ, 114
- The Music of J.S. Bach, 552
- J.S. Bach: French Suites, 30 Variations on Walsingham, 1722
- J.S. Bach: Six Partitas, 599
- J.S. Bach: English Suites, 1723
- My Favorite Bach Recordings, 2013
- J.S. Bach: Aria with 30 Variations
- Selections from Bach's Brandenburg Concerti
- J.S. Bach: Concerto in D Minor, Seven Toccatas for Harpsichord
- The Complete Collected Harpsichord Works of J.S. Bach
- The Complete Collected Organ Works of J.S. Bach
- Ad Nos, Ad Salutaremudam & Fantasia and Fugue on BACH, Music of Franz Liszt
- 3 Great Piano Duets
- Three Symphonies for Organ Solo *, 240
- Nicole and the Trial of the Century *, 1994
- Complete Works for Cello and Piano *, 121
- Complete Works for Violin and Piano *, 253
- Te Deum Laudamus *, 2007
- Large Chamber Works: Chamber Concerto, String Quartet #2, Piano Quintet *
- Complete Works for Organ *, 17501941, 2016
- American Classic Symphonies 1 and 2 *, 200
- Ittzes Plays Newman: Complete Works for Flute *, 309
- 12 Preludes and Fugues in Ascending Key Order for Piano Solo *
- Complete Music for Violin *, 112
- The Complete Original Works of Anthony Newman on 20 CDs *
- Concertino for Piano & Orchestra *
- On Fallen Heros: Orchestral Works *
- 6 Concertos *, 1915, 2015
- 9 Sonatas for Piano Solo *, 1331,
- 4 Symphonies *, 16851750, 2017
- Complete Works for Piano *, 10964, 2015
- Complete Chamber Works *, 1516
- Angel Oratorio *
- Complete Choral Works *, 2017
- Three Commissioned Works ^ 3-2015, 2015
- Lectures on Bach's Well Tempered Clavier, Books I and II, 1724, 2015
- Anthony Newman Plays Vierne, Mozart, Stravinsky, Newman, Bach, and Couperin
- Eugenia Zukerman and Anthony Newman play Bach, Haydn, and Hummel, 4143
- New Music for Heard and Mind *, 713
- Wedding Album, 170
- Wedding Album, Great Music for a Great Occasion
- Danielle Farina Plays Anthony Newman, 2013
- Complete Works for Piano Four Hands, 10814, 2016
- Great Works for the Organ Taken From Operas, 502
- Celebratory Music for Harpsichord, 215

Albany Records

- Absolute Joy, TROY 327, 1999
- Bach 2000 A Musical Tribute, 357, 2000
- Nicole and the Trial of the Century, 351, 20000
- Air Force Strings Label
- Newman: Concerto for Viola and Orchestra *
- Arabesque Recordings
- Newman's Valentine Songs, 2016
- Great Christmas Music for the Organ, Z6881, 2015
- Cambridge Records
- Music by Anthony Newman *, CRS B 2833, 1978

CBS Masterworks/Columbia

- Anthony Newman Harpsichord, M 30062,1968
- Anthony Newman – JS Bach, MS 7421, 1969
- Music for Organ, M 31127, 1969
- Anthony Newman Plays and Conducts Bach and Haydn, MQ 32300, 1973
- Anthony Newman Plays Harpsichord, Organ, and Pedal Harpsichord, M 32229, 1973
- Anthony Newman Plays J.S. Bach on the Pedal Harpsichord and Organ, MS 7309, 1968
- Bach: Goldberg Variations, M 30538, 1971
- The Well Tempered Clavier Book I, M2 32500, 1973
- The Well Tempered Clavier Book II, M2 32875, 1971
- Bach: The Six Brandenburg Concertos, M2 31398, 1972
- Lutheran Organ Mass, M2-32497, 1973
- Bhajebochstiannanas *, M 32439, 1973
- Organ Orgy, M 33268, 1975
- J.S. Bach/Anthony Newman, MS 7421, 1970

Connoisseur/Arabesque

- Brahms: The Two Cello Sonatas
- Mozart: Sonata in D for Two Fortepianos, 8125

Delos Productions

- Toning – Music for Healing and Energy *, DE 3213, 1997
- Music for a Sunday Morning, DE 3173, 1995

Deutsche Grammophon

- J.S. Bach: Arias, 429737, 1990

Digitech

- Handel: Water Music, Music for the Royal Fireworks, DIGI 103, 1979

Epiphany Records

- Concerts Royaux, EP-23, 2017

Essay

- Martin: Concerto for Seven Wind Instruments, 1014, 1991

Excelsior Records

- Masterpieces for Flute, 1982
- J.S. Bach: The Ultimate Organ Collection, EXL-2-5221, 1994

Helicon

- Bach at Lejansk, HE1010, 1996
- Bach In Celebration, 5107, 2000
- Bach: The Goldberg Variations
- Infinity Digital/Sony
- Bach Favorite Organ Works, QK 62385, 1992
- Bach: Goldberg Variations, QK 625882, 1996
- Bach: Toccatas, 1996

Kelos

- Bach: Great Works for Organ – Toccatas and Fugues, 2000

Khaeon

- Bach: The Well Tempered Clavier, Book 1 (complete piano and harpsichord) Vol I, KWM6001031, 2001
- Bach: The Well Tempered Clavier, Book 1 (complete piano and harpsichord) Vol II, KWM6001032, 2001
- Bach: The Well Tempered Clavier, Book 1 (complete piano and harpsichord) Vol III, KWM6001033, 2001
- Bach: The Great Works for the Organ
- Requiem *, KWM600102

Musical Heritage Society

- Telemann: Six “Konzerte” for Flute and Concertante Harpsichord, MHS 4523, 1982
- Two Generations: Concerti for Guitar and Chamber Orchestra, MHS 7397A, 1986
- Vivaldi Oboe Concerti, 513905X, 1993

Naxos

- The Four Seasons, 2006

Newport Classic

- Bach: Preludes and Fugues for Organ, Vol 1, NCD 60001, 1986
- Bach: Preludes and Fugues for Organ, Vol 2, NCD 60002, 1986
- Bach: Preludes and Fugues for Organ, Vol 3, NCD 60003, 1986
- Bach: Preludes and Fugues for Organ, Vol 4, NC 60004, 1986
- Bach: 6 Trio Sonatas, LC 8554, 1995
- Bach: Favorite Works for Organ, NCD 60090, 1992
- Bach Brandenburgs
- Beethoven: Four Great Sonatas (fortepiano), NCD 60040, 1988
- Beethoven: Violin Sonatas, NCD 60097, 1990
- Couperin: Two Organ Masses, NCD 60041, 1988
- Falla: Harpsichord Concerto, NC 60017, 1986
- Franck: Complete Works for the Organ, Vol I, NCD 60060, 1987
- Franck: Complete Works for the Organ, Vol I, NCD 60061, 1987
- J.S. Bach: Goldberg Variations, NCD 60024, 1987
- Bach: St. John Passion, NC 60015/1, 1986
- For God and Country, NCD 85533, 1994
- Keyboard Companion, NCD60026, 1991
- César Franck; Complete Organ Works, Vol I, NCD060060, 1989
- César Franck; Complete Organ Works, Vol II, NCD060061, 1989
- Mozart: 6 Fortepiano Sonatas, Vol I, NCD 60121, 1990
- Mozart: 4 Fortepiano Sonatas, Vol II, NCD 60122, 1990
- Mozart: 4 Fortepiano Sonatas, Vol III, NCD 60123, 1990
- Mozart: 4 Fortepiano Sonatas, Vol IV, NCD 60124, 1990
- W.A. Mozart: Seven Sonatas for Flute and Keyboard, NCD 60120, 1992
- Mozart: Complete Music for String Orchestra, NCD 60137, 1990
- Romantic Masterworks for Organ, Vol I, NCD 60060, 1989
- Romantic Masterworks for Organ, Vol II, NCD 60050, 1989
- Scarlatti Sonatas, NCD 60080, 1989
- Solo Organ Concerti, NCD 60071, 1989
- Beethoven: Piano Concerto No. 1 (fortepiano), NC 60031, 1987
- Beethoven: Piano Concertos No. 2 and 4 (fortepiano), NCD 60081, 1988
- Beethoven: Piano Concerto No. 3 (fortepiano), NC60007, 1986
- Beethoven: Piano Concerto No. 5 (fortepiano), NC 60027, 1987
- J.S. Bach: Concertos for One and Two Harpsichords, NC 60023, 1987
- Schumann: Piano Concerto, NCD 60034
- Beethoven: Violin Sonatas (fortepiano)
- Lutheran Organ Mass, NCD 60073
- On Fallen Heroes, Orchestral Works by Anthony Newman *, NCD 60140, 1992
- A Christman Album, NCD 60072, 1989
- Newman New Music *, NCD 60032, 1988
- Time Pieces, NCD 6044
- Contemporary American Piano Music, NCD 60048

OUR Recordings

- Telemann: Complete Recorder Sonatas, 8226909, 2014

Peter Pan

- Midnight in Havana, 4411, 1999

Sheffield

- A Bach Organ Recital, S-6, 1966

Sine Qua Non

- Bach: Favorite Organ Music, SQN-7771, 1976
- Bach: Organ Masterpieces, SA 2042, 1981
- Bach: Harpsichord Collection, SQN-2050

Sonoma

- Music for Organ, Brass, and Timpani, SAC-001, 2004

Sony

- Handel: Harpsichord Suites, SBK 62834, 1997, 1992
- Mozart: Famous Piano Sonatas, 63290, 1997
- Scarlatti: Harpsichord Sonatas, SBK 62654, 1989, 1996
- Baroque Duet, SK 46672, 1992
- Grace, 62035, 1995
- Saint-Saëns: Symphony No. 3, 'Organ', SK 53979, 1996
- Bach: The Brandenburg Concertos, 62472, 1994
- Classic Wynton, 60804, 1998
- In Gabriel's Garden, 66244, 1996
- Organ Orgy, 1974
- Bach: Goldberg Variations, SICC 2107, 1972
- Newman Plays Newman *, GS 9005, 1984
- The Wedding Album, MDK 47273, 1991
- Mozart: Eine Kleine Nachtmusik; Symphonies 35, 40, 41, 63272, 1997
- Lease Breakers, 1985
- Wynton Marsalis: The London Concert, 1995

Vox

- Bach: The Twenty-Four Organ Preludes and Fugues, Vol I, SVBX 5479, 1976
- Bach: The Twenty-Four Organ Preludes and Fugues, Vol II, SVBX 5480, 1976
- Bach: Toccatas for Harpsichord, 7520, 1996
- Famous Organ Works
- Bach: Suite No. 2 in B minor; Telemann: Suite in A minor, DVCL 9017, 1986
- Kodaly: Missa Brevis; Vaughan—Williams: Mass in G Minor, VCS 9076
- Vivaldi: Six Sonatas for Cello and Harpsichord, VCL 9074

Vox Cum Laude

- J.S. Bach Six Sonatas for Flute and Keyboard, VCL 9070, 1984
- Bach: Well-Tempered Clavier, Book I, VCL 9056, 1983
- Bach: The 3 Gamba Sonatas, D-VCL 9020, 1983
- Jane's Hand: The Jane Auste Songbooks, VCL 7537, 1997

Vox Box

- JS Bach: 24 Preludes and Fugues Vol, I, CDX 5013, 1995
- JS Bach: 24 Preludes and Fugues, Vol. II, CDX 5100, 1995

MMG Vox Prima

- The Heroic Mr. Handel, MWCD 7100, 1986

Turnabout Vox

- Soler: 6 Concerti for 2 Keyboard Instruments, TV 341365, 1968
- Bach Organ Works, QTV-S 34656, 1976
- Organ Favorites for the Christmas Season, 34797,
- Bach at Madeira, 346656

Warner Classics

- The Bach Family, 61-7505, 1984

== Awards ==
- 1958 French Government Bourse Scholarship
- 1963 Variell Fellowship, Harvard University
- 1964 Winner, International Composition Competition (organ solo), Nice, France
- 1967 Fulbright Fellowship
- 1977 Harpsichordist of the Year, Keyboard magazine
- 1978 Harpsichordist of the Year, Keyboard magazine
- 1981 Classical Keyboardist of the Year, Keyboard magazine
- 1986 Beethoven's Third Piano Concerto chosen Record of the Year by Stereo Review
- 1993 Boston University Distinguished Graduate award
- 2004 Musica Sacra award
- 30 consecutive annual composer awards from The American Society of Composers, Authors and Publishers (ASCAP)
