= Lyrichord Discs =

- Parent company: Multicultural Media
- Founded: 1950
- Founder: Peter Fritsch
- Genre: World music, classical, early music
- Country of origin: United States
- Location: New York City
- Official website: worldmusicstore.com

Lyrichord Discs is an American record label specializing in world music and classical music. In 2015, Multicultural Media acquired Lyrichord's catalog.

== History ==
The label was founded in 1950 by Peter Fritsch, an Austrian immigrant who moved to America in the 1930s. In the 1940s, he worked as an executive at Musicraft Records before founding Lyrichord. Money for the new label came from his wife, Theresa, after she won a contest to write an advertising jingle. Eventually Fritsch turned the label over to his son, Nick, who ran it with his wife, Lesley Doyel.

Lyrichord concentrated on classical music, early music, world music, and field recordings. According to the obituary of Fritsch in Billboard, the label "became one of the first to publish the field-work recordings of anthropologists and ethnomusicologists. Lyrichord's world music catalog features Ituri rainforest recordings by Colin Turnbull."

The label's catalog also includes Jerry Willard, Julianne Baird, Elaine Comparone, Elizabeth Futral, Liz Knowles, Louis Moyse, Ama Deus Ensemble, Humbert Lucarelli, Ernő Balogh and G. S. Sachdev.

Early classical music has been another of its specialties: "with this recording, Lyrichord Discs continues its outstanding service to early music fanciers." Lyrichord recorded the first album by folk singer Dave Van Ronk, entitled Skiffle in Stereo (1957).
