= Charlotte Chorpenning =

American children's playwright

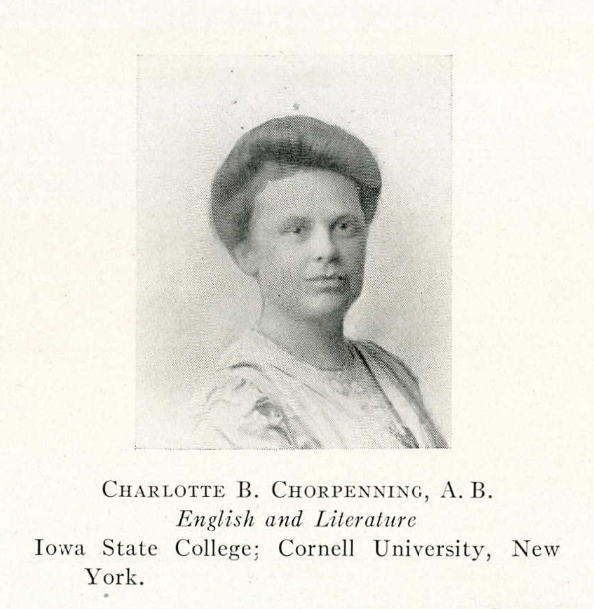
Yearbook photo of Charlotte Barrows Chorpenning from 1912, when she was the English and Literature teacher at the Winona State Normal School, Minnesota

Charlotte Barrows Chorpenning (3 Jan 1872– 7 Jan 1955) was an American children's playwright. When she was 60 years old, after her husband died, she began writing plays for children. She was also the artistic director of the children's theatre at the Goodman Theater in Chicago and remains the most produced playwright in the Goodman's history. She adapted many famous fairy and folktales. She believed that children would come to see plays about characters they knew already. She also strongly believed that plays should not talk down to children and that children should be able to identify with the lead. Chorpenning described her writing and directing process in her book, Twenty-One Years With Children's Theatre, published in 1954.

== Biography ==
Charlotte Lee Barrows was born on 3 January 1872 in Hudson, Ohio. She studied at Radcliffe College. On 3 August 1896, she married John C. Chorpenning. From about 1915 to 1919, she was a playwright in residence at various Winona, Minnesota organizations. Her daughter Ruth Chorpenning was a character actress on Broadway.

Chorpenning wrote adaptations of many stories, and many of these plays remain in print. One play in particular is out of print: an adaptation of Helen Bannerman's Little Black Sambo. According to Jodi Van Der Horn-Gibson, aside from some unflattering stereotypical names and the same confusion Bannerman had regarding the difference between India and Africa, the play is a non-offensive version of the story.

Chorpenning died on January 7, 1955, at her home in Warwick, New York. The obituary published in the Educational Theatre Journal stated, "The American theatre is indebted to her for her skill as a playwright, her ability as a teacher, her strength as a leader, and her humanity as a friend."

The American Alliance for Theatre and Education awards the Charlotte B. Chorpenning Award for the body of work of a children's playwright. Award recipients include Doug Cooney (2010), Barry Kornhauser (2009), James DeVita (2007), Mary Hall Surface (2006), and Aurand Harris (1985 and 1967).

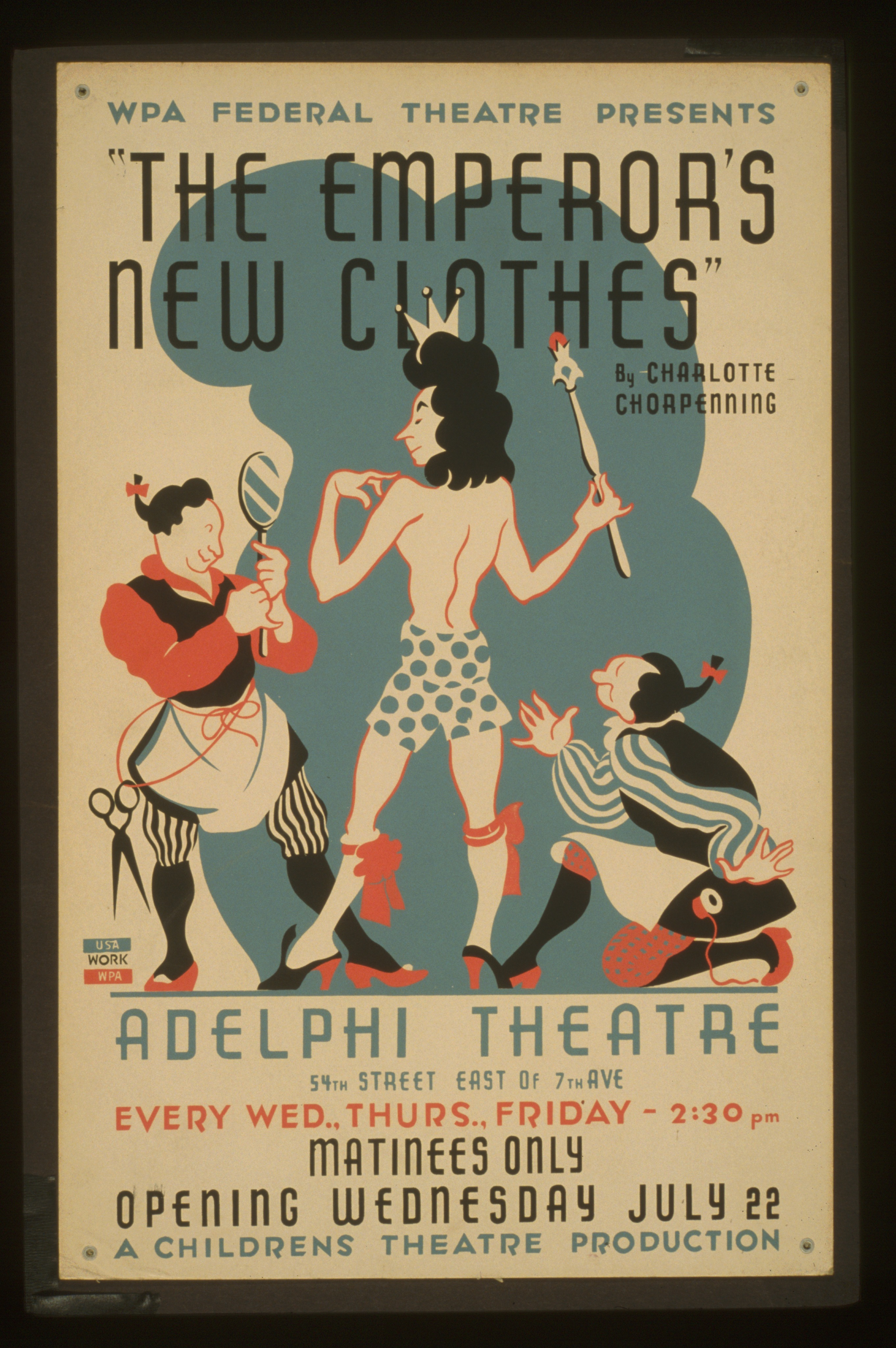
WPA Federal Theatre presents "The Emperor's New Clothes" by Charlotte Chorpenning (1936)

== Plays ==
=== Published by Anchorage Press Plays/Dramatic Publishing ===
- Cinderella
- The Elves and the Shoemaker
- Flibbertygibbet
- The Indian Captive
- Jack and the Beanstalk
- Little Red Riding Hood
- Robinson Crusoe
- Rumplestiltzkin
- The Sleeping Beauty

=== Published by Classic Youth Plays ===
- A Letter to Santa Claus
- Lincoln's Secret Messenger

=== Published by Dramatic Publishing ===
- The Adventures of Tom Sawyer
- Alice in Wonderland
- Hansel and Gretel
- The Magic Horn
- Many Moons, based on the illustrated book of the same name written by James Thurber
- Rip Van Winkle

=== Published by Samuel French, Inc. ===
- The Emperor's New Clothes
- Tom Sawyer's Treasure Hunt

=== Out of print ===
- Little Black Sambo
