= Richard Auldon Clark =

American conductor

Richard Auldon Clark is an American conductor specializing in music by contemporary composers. He is Conductor and music director of both the Manhattan Chamber Orchestra, which he founded in 1987, and the Butler Symphony Orchestra. He has premiered over 100 works and recorded over 40 CDs. His repertoire is of little known older works and new music by such composers as Randall Thompson, Victor Herbert, Michael Schelle, Henry Cowell, Alan Hovhaness, Lukas Foss, David Amram, Dave Soldier, Miho Sasaki and Osvaldo Lacerda. He also performs music of earlier periods, including works by Handel, Mozart, Beethoven, Brahms, Ibert, Verdi, and others. He is founder / music director of the annual Finger Lakes Summer Chamber Music Festival in upstate New York. He is also the head of the orchestral program at the Jordan College of Fine Arts at Butler University.
