= Valentin Radu =

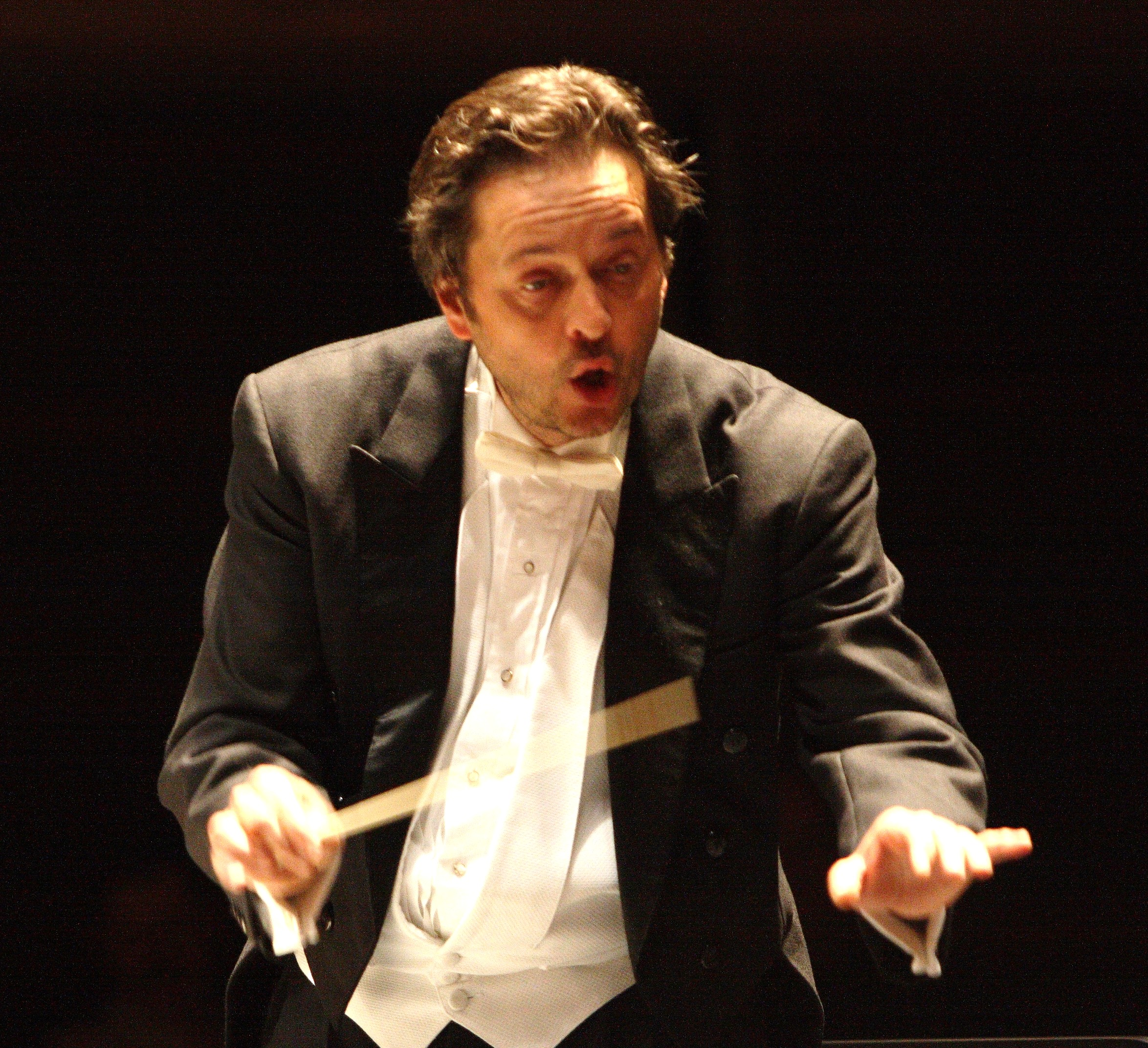

Background information
- Born: October 27, 1956 (age 69); Bucharest, Romania
- Genres: Classical, Early Music, Jazz
- Occupations: pianist, organist, conductor
- Instruments: Piano, Organ
- Years active: ca. 1963-present
- Labels: Warner, PolyGram, Sony, Lyrichord
- Website: www.VoxAmaDeus.org

Valentin Radu is founder, artistic director and conductor of Vox Ama Deus, (currently consisting of the Camerata Ama Deus, the Ama Deus Ensemble and the Vox Renaissance Consort) with performances at the Kimmel Center in Philadelphia and other various city, suburban, and Main Line area venues, has led numerous orchestras and vocal ensembles in Europe and the U.S., including the Hungarian National Philharmonic, Bucharest, Arad, Oradea Philharmonics, the Budapest Chamber Orchestra and the Romania National Radio Orchestra. In 1996 he conducted the Bucharest Philharmonic in Handel's Messiah, and in 1997 led the Romanian National Radio Orchestra in Handel's Acis and Galatea (both English language premieres).

== Biography ==
He has conducted Vox Ama Deus in various programs ranging from motets and madrigals to authentically staged Renaissance operas performed on original instruments. Since 1997, he has conducted the Ama Deus Ensemble and Maestro Dan Grigore, a Romanian pianist, in Viennese Gala concerts in Philadelphia. He has conducted Peter Donohoe as well in annual American Contemporary concerts at The Kimmel Center. He also conducted Ama Deus Ensemble in its yearly Good Friday performances at Cathedral Basilica of SS Peter and Paul in Philadelphia.

Valentin Radu and the Ama Deus Ensemble have recorded on several labels, featuring such masterpieces as Handel's Messiah, Bach's B Minor Mass and Magnificat, Handel's Acis and Galatea, Vivaldi's Gloria and Magnificat, Handel's Fireworks (Water Music, Royal Fireworks, Organ Concert No. 4, Op. 4), and Brahms' Ein Deutsches Requiem on the Lyrichord label. Their discography (a library of 18 as of 2010) also includes: A Baroque Christmas, A European Christmas, A Renaissance Noel on the PolyGram label, and Glad Tidings, released on both the Warner label and Sony Classics.

Born in Romania, Valentin Radu began his music studies at age four. At age six he made his concert debut on the stage of the Bucharest Philharmonic (as a piano recitalist) and at age nine as a concert soloist with the Bucharest Philharmonic Orchestra. In 1973, at 16, he won the prestigious Rome Piano Competition, and in 1979 - the Saarbrücken Organ Competition. In 1980, he won the silver medal at the Bach International Competition in Leipzig.

Radu holds Doctoral and master's degrees from the Juilliard School and a Bachelor of Music degree from the Bucharest Academy of Music. In 1976, he founded and conducted Juvenes Musici, a chamber orchestra under the auspices of the Bucharest Philharmonic. In 1980 he founded “The Juilliard Bach Players” chamber orchestra and initiated the "Bach at Juilliard" concert series at New York's Lincoln Center.

In 1984 Radu was invited to inaugurate and, in 1985, make the first LP solo recording on the newly rebuilt organ of the Imperial Chapel of Schönbrunn Palace in Vienna. The original instrument was built in 1721, on which Mozart himself performed during his 12 years as Vienna's Court Musician.

In addition to being a classical music scholar and artist, Valentin Radu has been involved in jazz performance as a conductor and a solo performer. In December 1998, he conducted the 97-member Bucharest Philharmonic in a Gershwin Centennial Gala concert, featuring the Rhapsody in Blue, An American in Paris, and Porgy and Bess. In November 1999, Radu conducted the Arad Philharmonic in a centennial concert featuring works by Duke Ellington and George Gershwin. Since May 2000, Radu has conducted jazz concerts in Bucharest, with the "Sound" choir group, that has featured singer Teodora Enache and Johnny Răducanu.

In May 1999, Radu participated in the historic visit to Romania of Pope John Paul II. In September 2004, he was invited to be the sole performer at a special United Nations gala in New York honoring the President of Romania.

In December 1997, Radu was awarded the Golden Apple by New York City Mayor Rudolph Giuliani. In February 1999, the Romanian Music Critics’ Association named him "1998 Musician of the Year". In April 2003, Radu was bestowed the title of Honorary Citizen of the City of Bucharest by the mayor of his native town who became Romania's president.

On December 20, 2005, Valentin Radu received the Grand Officer of the Order of Cultural Merit, in recognition of his lifetime achievement in the arts and his efforts as "Cultural Ambassador" of Romania.

Valentin Radu also teaches music history and appreciation at Devon Preparatory School in Devon, Pennsylvania and heads the school's music department (music director 1995–2012), and was the music director for Philadelphia's Arch Street United Methodist Church (1994–2011).
