= Ruth Chorpenning =

American actress

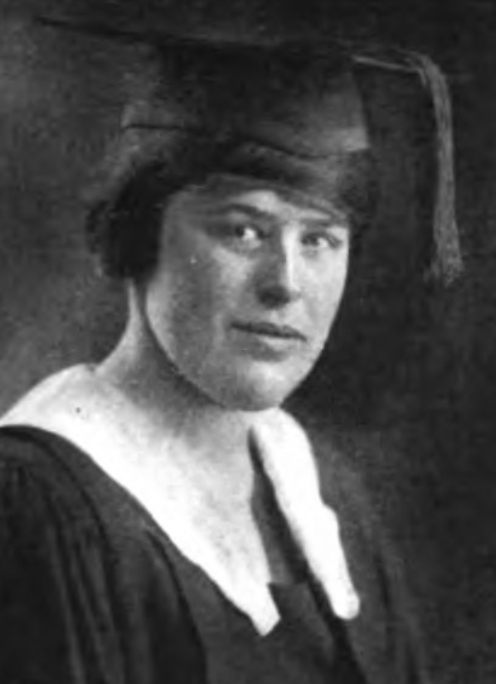
- Ruth Chorpenning, from the 1920 yearbook of Radcliffe College
- Born: Ruth Barrows Chorpenning; February 11, 1898; Springfield, Ohio
- Died: after 1977
- Other names: Ruth Chorpenning Norris (married name)
- Occupation(s): Actress, monologuist
- Mother: Charlotte Chorpenning

Ruth Barrows Chorpenning Norris (11 Feb 1898–3 Jul 1980) was an American stage actress and monologuist. She originated the character "Ado Annie" in Green Grow the Lilacs.

== Early life and education ==
Chorpenning was born in Springfield, Ohio and raised in Colorado and Minnesota, the daughter of John C. Chorpenning and Charlotte Barrows Chorpenning. Her mother was a teacher, poet, and playwright. She survived spinal meningitis as a baby, and her father died of tuberculosis when she was a teen. She graduated from Radcliffe College in 1920, and from the School of the Theatre in 1922.

== Career ==
Chorpenning appeared on Broadway in the shows The Jolly Roger (1923), Cyrano de Bergerac (1923, 1926), Charley's Aunt (1925), Sam Abramovitch (1927), Hot Pan (1928), Him (1928), Dorian Gray (1928), The International (1928), Fiesta (1929), Red Rust (1929), The Garrick Gaieties (1930), Green Grow the Lilacs (1931), Lost Boy (1932), Jamboree (1932), Marathon (1933), Ah, Wilderness! (1933), The Puritan (1936), Swing Your Lady (1936), Sun Kissed (1937), Love in My Fashion (1937), Family Portrait (1939), and Ring Around Elizabeth (1941). Caricature artist Al Hirschfeld sketched Chorpenning with other cast members of The Garrick Gaieties in 1930.

Beyond her Broadway career, Chorpenning choreographed and performed at a May Day pageant at Ohio State University in 1916. She worked with her husband on community theatre projects for the Eastern Cooperative League, the University of Louisville School of Social Work, and the Federal Negro Theatre. In 1942, she played all the roles in an NBC radio serial written her husband, titled Brownstone Front.

== Publications ==
- "Romey and Julie": A Romantic Comedy (1936, with Robert Dunmore, James Norris, and Margaret Bonds)
- "Recreation in Cooperatives" (1943)

== Personal life ==
Chorpenning married fellow actor and playwright James Norris. In 1978, she and her husband gave interviews to two scholars researching her mother Charlotte for their dissertations. She died on 3 July 1980, in Monroe, Florida.
