= Newport Classic =

American record label

- Founder: Lawrence Kraman
- Genre: classical music
- Location: Middletown, Rhode Island

Newport Classic, Ltd, is a record label of classical music, founded by Lawrence Kraman, and is located in Middletown, Rhode Island.

In its catalog are recordings of both familiar and unusual works, including Casanova's Homecoming, A Waterbird Talk, Trouble in Tahiti, A Ceremony of Carols, Médée (the original opéra-comique of Luigi Cherubini, in French), Il campanello di notte, The Jumping Frog of Calaveras County, Acis and Galatea, Berenice, Joshua, Muzio, Siroe, Sosarme, La canterina, Le vin herbé, The Consul, Help, Help, the Globolinks!, The Ballad of Baby Doe, The Devil and Daniel Webster, Winterreise, Le sacre du printemps, Pimpinone, and the first recording of Alberto Ginastera's Second Cello Concerto.

In 2008, Newport Classic produced a DVD of a production of Willie Stark, which included an interview with the composer, Carlisle Floyd.

Performers heard on this label include John Aler, David Arnold, Julianne Baird, Thom Baker, Richard Bonynge, Débria Brown, Joyce Castle, John Cheek, Michael Chioldi, John DeMain, Colin Duffy, Michael Feldman, Lauren Flanigan, Bart Folse, D'Anna Fortunato, Elizabeth Futral, Jon Garrison, Jan Grissom, Grayson Hirst, John Keene, Igor Kipnis, Jennifer Lane, Vincent La Selva, Andrea Matthews, Erie Mills, Drew Minter, John Ostendorf, Rudolph Palmer, Joel Revzen, Ned Rorem, Thaïs St Julien, Gregg Smith, Johannes Somary, Vern Sutton, Phyllis Treigle, Christine Weidinger, Jayne West, and Eugenia Zukerman.
