= Bonnie Rideout =

American fiddler (born 1962)

Bonnie Rideout (born 1962 - Saline, Michigan USA) is an American fiddler. She is especially known for her traditional Scottish style and fiddle piobaireachd playing. She is a graduate of the University of Michigan School of Music. She is a recording artist, her touring career spanning three decades.

== Background ==
Rideout was born into a musical family of Scots descent and grew up in the rural communities of Saline, Michigan and Cliff Island, Maine. Without television, her family spent much of their time playing music. Rideout attended Saline High School and studied under Robert Phillips. She graduated from the University of Michigan School of Music. Rideout signed with the Maggie's Music Record Label between 1994 and 2001. In 2003 she incorporated her own independent record label, Tulloch Music, Ltd. Rideout's popular album, A Scottish Christmas, became a New York Times‚ "Top Ten Holiday Best Seller". Its success prompted a touring show, which ran for over fifteen years across North America. Her popular recording, "Gi' Me Elbow Room" received the National Parent's Choice Gold Award. In 2007, the Mel Bay Publishing Company credited Rideout as one of America's most influential traditional fiddlers of the 20th century. She is a member of the National Academy of Recording Arts and Sciences (NARAS), having served on the Board of Governors for the Washington D.C. branch. Rideout is the only American to hold the honor of representing Scottish fiddle music at the Edinburgh International Festival. She is the first woman to hold the National Scottish Fiddle title and the youngest to have garnered the U.S. Championship, winning it for three consecutive years. Rideout discontinued competing to become an adjudicator and professional recording artist and has maintained a consistently high profile in the Celtic music scene.

== Reception ==
Bonnie Rideout has been featured on the BBC, CBS, NPR‚ Performance Today, and Morning Edition. She is also consistently played on NPR's The Thistle and Shamrock. In addition to authoring seven music books for Mel Bay Publications, Bonnie has recorded over fifteen solo albums and appeared as a guest artist on dozens of CDs for Sony, BMG, Time Life, EMI, Ryco Disc, Maggie's‚ Music, Dorian, and Rounder Records. In 2003, she incorporated her own record label, Tulloch Music, Ltd.

== Discography ==
=== Feature Projects ===
- Soft May Morn - MM208 - 1991, 1994
- Celtic Circles - MM209 - 1994
- Kindred Spirits - MM214 - 1996
- A Scottish Christmas - MM215 - 1996
- Gi' Me Elbow Room - MM219 - 1998
- Scottish Fire - MM222 - 2000
- Scottish Rant - MM223 - 2000
- Scottish Reflections - MM225 - 2003
- Scottish Inheritance - TM501 - 2003
- A Scottish Christmas, THE CELEBRATION - TM502 - 2004
- Bonnie Rideout LIVE - TM503 - 2005
- Scottish Fiddle Collection - MM306 - 2006
- Scotland's Fiddle Piobaireachd - Vol. I - TM504 - 2010
- HARLAW, Scotland 1411 - TM505 - 2011
- Scotland's Fiddle Piobaireachd, Vol. II - TM506 - 2012

=== Collaboration Projects ===
- Music in the Great Hall/Ensemble Galilei - MM226 -1992
- Ancient Noels/Ensemble Galilei - MM108 - 1994
- Celtic Roots/Hesperus - MM220 - 1999
- The Art of Robert Burns I - SCTM001 - 2003
- The Art of Robert Burns II - SCTM002 - 2005

=== DVD ===
- A Scottish Christmas, Featuring Bonnie Rideout - 2001

=== Musicians Bonnie Rideout has recorded with ===
Bryan Aspey, Matt Bell, Barnaby Brown, The City of Washington Pipe Band, Chris Caswell, Tony Cuffe, John Doyle, Ensemble Galilei, Cathy Fink & Marcy Marxer, Paula and Charlie Glendinning, Grace Griffith, Grant Herreid, Hesperus, Steve Holloway, Andy Hunter, Billy Jackson, Linda Kirk, Allan MacDonald, Ronn MacFarlane, Kevin McCrae, Patrick Molard, The Musicians of Edinburgh, Abby Newton, Chris Norman, Simon O'Dwyer, Jerry O'Sullivan, Al Petteway, John Purser, Sue Richards, Betty Rideout, Eric Rigler, Maggie Sansone, Elizabeth Stewart, Sweet Honey in the Rock, Bill Taylor, Athena Tergis.

=== Record Labels representing Bonnie Rideout ===
Tulloch Music, Virtual Label LLC, Sony BMG, Time Life, EMI, Rykodisc, Maggie's Music, Dorian, Rounder Records, and Scotstown Music.
