= Music of Grace: Amazing Grace =

Compilation album by Various Artists
- Released: 13 October 2009
- Genre: Inspirational, new-age, Christian, Celtic
- Language: English
- Label: Valley Entertainment
- Producer: Ellen Holmes

Various Artists chronology
Music of Grace: Amazing Grace	Sacred Songs of Mary

Music of Grace: Amazing Grace is a 2009 compilation album from Valley Entertainment consisting of fourteen versions of the hymn Amazing Grace.

== Track listing ==
No.	Title	Performer(s)	Length
1.	"Amazing Grace"	Katie McMahon	5:12
2.	"Amazing Grace"	Lisbeth Scott	6:38
3.	"Amazing Grace"	John Doan	4:48
4.	"Amazing Grace"	Walela	6:02
5.	"Amazing Grace"	Phyllis Taylor Sparks	3:20
6.	"Amazing Grace"	David Tolk	4:48
7.	"Amazing Grace"	Shanon	3:59
8.	"Amazing Grace"	Simeon Wood, Graham Hepburn, Amanda Barass & John Gerighty	3:43
9.	"Amazing Grace"	Cecilia	5:01
10.	"Amazing Grace"	Mark O'Connor	3:35
11.	"Amazing Grace"	City of Washington Pipe Band & Bonnie Rideout	2:33
12.	"Amazing Grace"	Nana Mouskouri	4:32
13.	"Amazing Grace"	The St. Philips Boy’s Choir	2:42
14.	"Amazing Grace"	William Neil	3:08
