= Dove Across the Water =

Studio album by Ossian
- Released: 1982
- Genre: Folk
- Label: Iona Records

Ossian chronology
Seal Song (1981)	Dove Across the Water (1982)	Borders (1984)

Dove Across The Water is a folk album by Ossian recorded and released in 1982. The original LP release was on Iona Records (catalogue number IONA IR0004), with at least one rerelease on CD currently unavailable.

The album was recorded at Castle Sound Studios, Pencaitland, East Lothian, Scotland during April 1982, was produced by Ossian and engineered by Calum Malcolm. It featured the addition of a bagpipe-flutist to the instrumentation in the album's songs.

The "Dove Across The Water" sequence is a rearranged and rerecorded version of music created for the film "Iona... Dove Across The Water" produced for Films Of Scotland by Mike Alexander in 1982.

== Track listing ==
This listing is taken from the original LP release. All titles are traditional arr. Ossian except where noted.

1. Duncan Johnstone / The Duck (D. Macleod) / The Curlew (D.Macpherson) (4:39)
2. Braw Sailin' on the Sea (Trad. / Cuffe) (5:02)
3. Drunk at Night, Dry in the Morning (2:54)
4. Will Ye Go To Flanders? (Trad. / Ross) (6:04)
5. Tae the Beggin' (4:43)
6. Mile Marbhaisg (2:54)
7. Dove Across The Water
  1. Iona Theme (Jackson) (1:56)
  2. March - The Cunning Workmen (Cuffe) (3:49)
  3. Columba (Jackson) (4:19)
  4. Iona Theme, Reprise (Jackson) (1:52)

== Personnel ==
- Billy Jackson - Harp, Uileann pipes, whistle, double bass, vocals
- George Jackson - Guitar, fiddle, whistle, vocals
- John Martin - Fiddle, cello, vocals
- Tony Cuffe - Vocals, guitar, tenor guitar, tiplé
- Iain MacDonald - Pipes, vocals, flute, whistle, Jew's harp

with Flora MacNeil and Maggie MacInnes
