= Iona Records =

Scottish record label

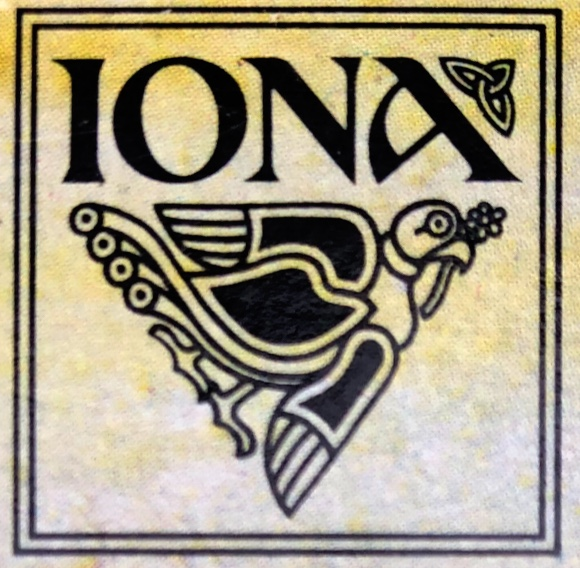
- Founded: 1978
- Founder: Ossian
- Defunct: 1990
- Genre: Folk
- Country of origin: Scotland
- Location: Cambuslang, Glasgow, Scotland

Iona was a Scottish independent record label from 1978 to 1990.

== History ==
The label was founded by the band Scottish folk band Ossian to publish their second album St. Kilda Wedding. The label continued to publish Ossian output as well as solo and other additional projects from the band members. In 1985, Iona published The Wellpark Suite by Billy Jackson which was commission by Tennents Lager for its centenary celebrations. The label was acquired in 1990 by Lismor Recordings. Iona published 13 original titles prior to 1990 which were expanded over the years to 74 before ceasing new productions and moving the complete catalogue into the new digital world.

Iona frequently used sound engineer Calum Malcolm

== Roster ==
- Ossian
- Billy/William Jackson
- Billy Kay & Jock Tamson's Bairns
- George Jackson
- Maggie MacInnes
- Tony Cuffe
- Eclipse First

== Catalogue ==
No.	Artist	Title	Engineer	Studio	Sleeve Design	Format	Date	Notes
IR001	Ossian	St. Kilda Wedding	Calum Malcolm	Castle Sound Studios, Edinburgh	Colin Browne, Design and Illustration; Raymond Pritchard, Photography	vinyl	1978	
IR002	Ossian	Seal Song	Calum Malcolm	Castle Sound Studios, Edinburgh; The Old Schoolhouse, Pencaitland, East Lothian	Colin Browne Designs; Norman Chalmers Photography	vinyl	1981	
IR003	Billy Kay & Jock Tamson's Bairns	Fergusson's Auld Reekie	Calum Malcolm	Castle Sound Studios, Pencaitland, East Lothian	Colin Browne Designs	vinyl	1981	
IR004	Ossian	Dove Across The Water	Calum Malcolm	Castle Sound Studios, Pencaitland, East Lothian	Hope and Browne, Edinburgh; Colin Browne, illustration	vinyl	1982	
IR005	Billy Jackson & Billy Ross	The Misty Mountain	Calum Malcolm	Castle Sound Studios, Pencaitland, East Lothian	Colin Browne, Design; George Neill, illustration	vinyl	1984	
IR006	George Jackson & Maggie MacInnes	Cairistiona	Calum Malcolm	Castle Sound Studios, Pencaitland, East Lothian	Colin Browne, Design; George Neill, illustration	vinyl	1984	
IR007	Ossian	Borders	Calum Malcolm	Castle Sound Studios, Pencaitland, East Lothian	Colin Browne, Design; George Neill, illustration	vinyl	1984	
IR008	Billy Jackson	The Wellpark Suite	Calum Malcolm	Castle Sound Studios, Pencaitland, East Lothian	Dean Park Associates, Design; Neil A. Walker, photography	vinyl	1985	Specially commissioned to celebrate the centenary of Tennent's Lager in Glasgow.
IR009	Ossian	Light on a Distant Short	Calum Malcolm	Ca Va Sound Workshops, Glasgow	Colin Browne/ Dean Park Associates	vinyl	1986	
IR010	William Jackson	Heart Music	Calum Malcolm	Castle Sound Studios, Pencaitland, East Lothian		vinyl	1987	
IR011	Tony Cuffe	When First I Went To Caledonia		Massasoit Community College, Mass. USA		vinyl	1987	
IR012	Eclipse First	Eclipse First				vinyl	1988	
IRCD013	Eclipse First	Names and Places				CD	1990	

== See also ==
- List of record labels
