= City of Washington (disambiguation) =

City of Washington referred to the District of Columbia up to 1871. Other uses of the phrase include:

- City of Washington (ship), American merchant steamship commissioned in 1877
- City of Washington Pipe Band, a grade two pipe band located in Washington, D.C.
