= Sunnyland =

Sunnyland may refer to:

== Place ==
- Sunnyland, Illinois, a census-designated place

== Music ==
- "Sunnyland", a song by Elmore James
- Sunnyland, a 2006 album by Edward Gerhard
- Sunnyland, a 2009 album by Zora Young
- Sunnyland (Mayday Parade album), a 2018 album by Mayday Parade

== See also ==
- Sunnylands, an estate in Rancho Mirage, California
- Sunnyland Slim
