= Pink Guitar =

Pink Guitar may refer to:

== Music ==
- Henry Mancini: Pink Guitar, a 2004 compilation album produced by James Jensen
- "Pink Guitar", a song on Reba McEntire's 2009 album Keep on Loving You
