= Maggie Sansone =

- Genres: Celtic music
- Instrument: Hammered dulcimer
- Years active: 1984–2023
- Label: Maggie's Music
- Website: http://www.maggiesansone.com/

Maggie Sansone (b. 1949) was a hammered dulcimer player and recording artist from Miami, Florida.

== Biography ==
Sansone started recording her music in 1984. Since then, she has made over a dozen recordings, both solo and as a guest artist or in collaboration with numerous recording artists such as Bonnie Rideout, Al Petteway, and Ensemble Galilei.

Although she was perhaps best known for her hammered dulcimer recordings, she also played the piano, guitar, mandolin, and Northumbrian small-pipes.

Sansone performed at the Maryland Renaissance Festival for more than twenty years. She resided in Maryland until her death on November 9, 2025.

== Maggie's Music ==
Sansone operated her own music label, Maggie's Music. The label features over fifty recordings of Celtic and contemporary acoustic music featuring twelve recording artists that include Al Petteway, Amy White, Bonnie Rideout, Robin Bullock, Karen Ashbrook, Paul Oorts, the City of Washington Pipe Band, Ensemble Galilei, Sue Richards, Hesperus Early Music Ensemble with Tina Chancey and more.

== Discography ==
- Hammer Dulcimer & Guitar (1984) cassette album: out of print, now included on Traditions
- Hammered Dulcimer Traditions (1987) cassette album: out of print, now included on Traditions
- Sounds of the Season, Vol. 1 (1988)
- Traditions (1989)
- Sounds of the Season, Vol. 2 (1990)
- Mist & Stone (1990)
- Music In The Great Hall: Instrumental Music From The Ancient Celtic Lands (with Ensemble Galilei) (1993)
- Ancient Noels (with Ensemble Galilei) (1993)
- Dance Upon The Shore (1994)
- A Scottish Christmas ( 1996) (with Bonnie Rideout and Al Petteway)
- A Traveler's Dream (1999)
- Celtic Meditations: Into The Light (2001)
- Merrily Greet the Time (2003) (with Sue Richards on Celtic harp)
- Mystic Dance: A Celtic Celebration (2004)
- A Celtic Fair (2007)
- Wind Drift: Celtic grooves, mystic moods (2010)
