= Seal Song =

Studio album by Ossian
- Released: 1981
- Label: Iona Records

Ossian chronology
St. Kilda Wedding (1978)	Seal Song (1981)	Dove Across the Water (1982)

Professional ratings
Review scores
Source	Rating
AllMusic	3/5 stars
The Encyclopedia of Popular Music	2/5 stars

Seal Song is a folk album by Ossian, released in 1981. The original LP release was on Iona Records (catalogue number IONA IR0002), with at least one re-release on CD.

The album was recorded at Castle Sound Studios, The Old School, Pencaitland, East Lothian, Scotland during 1981, produced by Ossian and engineered by Calum Malcolm.

== Track listing ==
This listing is taken from the original LP release. All titles are traditional arr. Ossian except where noted.

1. The Sound of Sleat (D. Mackinnon)/Aandowin' at the bow/The old reel (4:28)
2. To pad the road wi' me (2:38)
3. Coilsfield House (Nathaniel Gow) (4:04)
4. The hielandmen cam' doon the hill/The Thornton jig (3:33)
5. Aye waukin-o (4:20)
6. Corn rigs (Robert Burns) (3:20)
7. Lude's supper (Rory Dall) (2:47)
8. The road to Drumleman (Mitchell/Cuffe) (4:29)
9. A fisherman's song for attracting seals/Walking the floor (J. Chisholm) (5:27)
10. Mull of the mountains (4:38)

== Personnel ==
- Billy Jackson - harp, uilleann pipes, whistle, vocals
- George Jackson - cittern, guitar, flute, whistle
- John Martin - fiddle, cello, whistle, vocals
- Tony Cuffe - vocals, guitar, whistle, tiplé
