= Scottish music (1970–1979) =

== Births and deaths ==
=== Births ===
- Martyn Bennett (1971)

=== Deaths ===
- Les Harvey (1944–1972)
- Jimmy McBeath (1894–1974)
- Matt McGinn (1928–1977)
- Jeannie Robertson (1908–1975)

== Recordings ==
- 1971 "Be Glad for the Song Has No Ending" (Incredible String Band)
- 1972 "No More Forever" (Dick Gaughan)
- 1972 "The Boys of the Lough" (The Boys of the Lough)
- 1973 "Second Album" (The Boys of the Lough)
- 1974 "Live at Passim's" (The Boys of the Lough)
- 1976 "Lochaber No More" (The Boys of the Lough)
- 1976 "Ossian" (Ossian)
- 1976 "Battlefield Band" (Battlefield Band)
- 1977 "One World" (John Martyn)
- 1978 St. Kilda Wedding (Ossian)
- 1979 Scared to Dance (The Skids)
- 1979 Days in Europa (The Skids, issued twice)
- 1979 "Horrorshow" (Scars)
