= William Coulter =

- Born: 1959 (age 66–67)
- Origin: Ridgewood, New Jersey, United States
- Genres: Traditional Irish, folk, jazz
- Occupation: musician
- Instrument: guitar
- Years active: 1981–present

William Coulter is an American Celtic guitarist, performer, recording artist, and teacher. Since 1981 he has explored the world of traditional music as a soloist with ensembles including Isle of Skye, Orison, and the Coulter-Phillips Ensemble.

== Early life ==
William Coulter was born in 1959 in Ridgewood, New Jersey, the son of a classical singer who founded the Pro Arte Chorale, a professional choral group. William's early exposure to the classical techniques of choral music influenced his own guitar work. At the age of nine, Coulter began taking piano lessons, practicing on a borrowed piano. In his teens, the piano was replaced by an electric guitar, which he practiced in his basement accompanying Neil Young records. At the age of eighteen, Coulter traded his electric guitar for a classical guitar after attending a concert by noted classical guitarist Andrés Segovia.

After graduating high school, Coulter performed with several bands. In 1980, he moved to Santa Cruz, California, where he studied classical guitar and earned a Bachelor of Arts degree from the University of California-Santa Cruz. He went on to earn a master's degree in music from the San Francisco Conservatory of Music. Deeply interested in American folk music as well as traditional Celtic music, he went on to earn a second master's degree from the University of California-Santa Cruz in Ethnomusicology.

== Celtic trilogy ==
In 1984 Coulter met guitarist Benjamin Verdery at one of Verdery's concerts on the West Coast. Coulter was so taken by Verdery's music that he introduced himself to the guitarist after the concert. The two guitarists quickly discovered that they had much in common musically, and the two became friends. Despite living on opposite coasts of the United States, they stayed in touch. In 1990, they performed together for the first time.

In 1988, Coulter teamed up with four other San Francisco Bay instrumentalists to form an ensemble called Orison, the name taken from the Middle English word for prayer or invocation. The group, which included William Coulter, Barry Phillips, Shelley Phillips, Steve Coulter, and Anne Cleveland, came to the project with a collective repertoire that included music from both the folk and classical traditions, as well as original compositions. Their combinations of harp, guitar, cello, oboe, English horn, flute, and percussion produced an ethereal musical signature of "poignant beauty."

In 1993, Coulter invited Verdery to play on some recording sessions of traditional and contemporary Celtic music he was working. This first album Celtic Crossing was released in 1995 and reflected Coulter's longstanding love for traditional Celtic music. Inspired by this musical tradition, Coulter produced his own renditions of traditional jigs, reels, and airs, including "The Lark in the Morning," "Sí bheag, sí mhór," "Banish Misfortune," "Lagan Love," and others.

In 1997, Coulter and Verdery followed up with the album Celtic Sessions, which featured contemporary arrangements of old Irish songs. Coulter characterized the album as "pristine ... capturing a range of nuances and gentle moods that are rarely heard on recordings of Celtic music." In 1999, Coulter and Verdery concluded the trilogy with the album Crooked Road, which again featured traditional Irish and Scottish melodies, as well as some contemporary songs. The album features Benjamin Verdery on classical guitar, Barry Phillips on cello, Shelley Phillips on oboe and English horn, Lars Johanneson on flute, Deby Benton Grosjean on fiddle, and others.

== Shaker trilogy ==
Following the success of his Celtic trilogy of albums, Coulter went on record a second trilogy of albums with cellist Barry Phillips that explored the musical heritage of the Shakers, a religious group popular in the northeast United States in the 1800s. The Shakers practiced a form of worship that stressed humility and simplicity. They believed that music and dance were gifts from blessed spirits, and their music was characterized by exuberance and joy. Coulter and Barry Phillips were joined by other guest artists to produce the album Simple Gifts. The success of this album lead to a follow-up album Tree of Life, which also featured Shaker melodies. Coulter concluded his Shaker trilogy with the album Music on the Mountain, which featured additional Shaker dances, hymns, and marches. Together, Coulter was able to produce music that "embodied the Shaker ideal of simplicity."

== Exploring other traditions ==
Following his Shaker trilogy, Coulter continued his exploration of traditional music, teaming up again with Benjamin Verdery to produce the album Song for Our Ancestors, which contained songs from several traditions. According to Coulter, their friendship had become "a musical agreement on how arrangements should go and how best to manage such matters as intonation and improvisation, to release the instrument's full range of feeling." The album included guitar duets from various musical traditions, including those of Ireland, Germany, Spain, Africa, and Tibet. One of the songs, "An Daingean," was composed by Coulter, who wrote it in honor of a coastal Irish town where his brother was married. Coulter and Verdery produced a unique sound, combining both steel and nylon strings in the arrangements.

Over the years, Coulter has produced a large body of work.

William Coulter's love of traditional melody is framed by a classical sense of composition and realized with an impeccable and sensitive guitar technique. William's well exercised craftsmanship and his unusual ability to direct the voices of the guitar as if they were a steel-string choir make the music come to life in his hands.

In 2004, Coulter released the album The Road Home, his first truly solo recording since he began exploring Celtic music over twenty years ago. The album contains tunes from Ireland, Brittany, Norway, Portugal and America, as well as several original compositions. Coulter also included a tribute to one of his teenage musical idols with his beautiful solo guitar arrangement of Neil Young's "After the Gold Rush." The album also features the exquisite guitar composition "Pastorale" and the lullaby waltz "The Road Home."

In addition to his own recordings, most of which were released on the Gourd Music label, Coulter has also performed on various compilations produced by the Narada, Windham Hill, and Hearts of Space labels. When not performing, he works as a recording engineer and producer, and teaches guitar at the University of California-Santa Cruz. During summers, he teaches at music camps including the National Guitar Summer Workshop, Alasdair Fraser's Valley of the Moon Scottish Fiddling School, and the Puget Sound Guitar Workshop.

== Discography ==
Albums

- 2004 The Road Home
- 2001 Song for Our Ancestors: Groovemasters Vol. 4 (With Benjamin Verdery)
- 2001 The Simple Gifts Collection (with Barry Phillips, box set)
- 1999 The Crooked Road
- 1997 Celtic Sessions
- 1995 Celtic Crossing
- 1993 Tree of Life (with Barry Phillips)
- 1992 Music on the Mountain (with Barry Phillips)
- 1992 Gravity Hill (Laurie Hart and William Coulter)
- 1990 Simple Gifts (with Barry Phillips)
- 1988 Orison: Celtic & Contemporary Instrumental Music (with Orison)

Appearances

- 2005 Essential Winter's Solstice
- 2004 Henry Mancini: Pink Guitar
- 2004 Very Best Of Celtic Christmas
- 2003 Celtic Circle
- 2001 Guitar Fingerstyle 2
- 2000 Celtic Soul
- 1999 Celtic Christmas: Peace On Earth
- 1999 Mozart Variations
- 1999 Daughter Of Lir (Mary Mc Laughlin)
- 1999 Sun Dance: Summer Solstice 3
- 1998 Thanksgiving
- 1998 Winter Solstice Reunion
- 1998 Celtic Christmas IV
- 1998 Conversations With God 2
- 1996 Celtic Spirit
- 1996 Celtic Treasure: The Legacy Of Turlough O'Carolan
- 1996 Celtic Twilight 3: Lullabies
- 1995 Sing Along Stew (Linda Arnold)
- 1994 Lullaby Land (Linda Arnold)
- 1993 Autumn In The Valley (Neal Hellman)
- 1992 Vanishing Borders (Northern Lights)
- 1992 World Turned Upside Down (Barry Phillips)
- 1989 Dream Of The Manatee (Neal Hellman)

== Articles ==
- Interview (2002), by Paul Magnussen
