= St. Kilda Wedding =

Studio album by Ossian
- Released: 1978
- Studio: Castle Sound Studios; Edinburgh, Scotland
- Label: Iona Records
- Producer: Ossian

Ossian chronology
Ossian (1977)	St. Kilda Wedding (1978)	Seal Song (1981)

St Kilda Wedding is a folk album by Scottish traditional music group Ossian recorded and released in 1978. The original LP release was on Iona Records (catalogue number IONA IR001), with at least one rerelease on CD currently unavailable.

The album was recorded at Castle Sound Studios, Edinburgh, Scotland, produced by Ossian and engineered by Calum Malcolm.

The songs on the album are traditional and include the reel St. Kilda Wedding which "describes the marriage ritual as performed in St Kilda at an early period, before they had an established missionary", as well as other songs related to the plight and fate of the St. Kilda islanders.

== Track listing ==
This listing is taken from the original LP release. All titles are traditional arr. Ossian.

1. The St. Kilda Wedding/Perrie werrie/The Honourable Mrs Moll's reel (4:21)
2. Gie me a lass wi a lump o' land (2:20)
3. Iomramh eadar Il' a's Uist (Rowing from Islay to Uist)/The source of Spey (4:00)
4. Dean cadalan sàmhach (3:34)
5. Gala Water/Major David Manson (4:05)
6. 'S gann gun dìrich mi chaoidh (3:03)
7. Farewell to whisky (4:10)
8. My love is the fair lad/The Forth Bridge/Pretty Pegg (3:30)
9. The Braes o' Strathblane (4:32)
10. More grog coming/Tilley Plump/Da foostra (3:16)

== Personnel ==
- Billy Jackson - Celtic harp, uilleann pipes, whistles, vocals
- John Martin - fiddle, cello, vocals
- George Jackson - fiddle, cittern, mandolin, fiddle, flute, whistle, flute, vocals
- Billy Ross - lead vocals, guitar, dulcimer, whistle

with Flora MacNeil, Isobel Nicolson, Sorley Maclean and Morag Macleod
