= Stuart Wilde =

British writer (1946–2013)

- Occupations: Writer; lecturer; teacher; essayist; humorist; scriptwriter; lyricist; music producer
- Children: Sebastien Wilde
- Relatives: Commander James Wilde DSC, RN, Liliana Wilde
- Writing career
- Pen name: Stuart Wilde
- Period: 1983–2013
- Subjects: Taoism, spirituality, personal development, cognition, culture, money, society, meditation, philosophy, ESP, consciousness, quantum mechanics
- Notable works: Miracles, The Force, The Quickening, The Trick to Money is Having Some, Infinite Self: 33 Steps to Reclaiming Your Inner Power, Sixth Sense, The Art of Meditation, Grace, Gaia and the End of Days, Plum Red
- Website: www.stuartwilde.com

Stuart Wilde (24 September 1946 – 1 May 2013) was a British writer. Best known for his works on New Age, self-empowerment, and spirituality, he was also a lecturer, teacher, humorist, essayist, scriptwriter, lyricist, and music producer. He was the author of twenty books including the popular series The Taos Quintet: Miracles, The Force, Affirmations, The Quickening, and The Trick to Money is Having Some.

== Early life ==
Wilde was born in Farnham, England. He has a twin sister, Dee Dee, who became well known in Britain for her weekly appearances on Top of the Pops with the dance troupe Pan's People. He was educated at St. George's College, Weybridge, Surrey. After his schooling he joined the English Stage Company in Sloane Square, London. A year later he opened a jeans business in Carnaby Street London, at the height of the Swinging Sixties where he enjoyed considerable commercial success.

== Career ==
He studied alternative religions and Taoist philosophy for five years from the age of twenty-eight, and when he was thirty-three, he emigrated to the United States of America where he lived in Laguna Beach, California with his first wife Cynthia. He wrote his first book, Miracles, in 1983.

Shortly thereafter he began a career as a lecturer appearing mainly in New Thought Churches and at New Age conferences. In the 1990s he toured regularly with Deepak Chopra, Dr. Wayne Dyer and Louise Hay, appearing at venues such as the Sydney Entertainment Centre.

Wilde's London street slang and comedic way of presenting self-empowerment and spiritual ideas continue to attract a wide and diverse audience. He has been called ahead of his time," 'the teacher's teacher' because of the influence he has had on other writers and lecturers in the field", provocative, poignant, controversial, funny, and his writing "timeless".

He remains a figure for progressive thought in metaphysics and the field of human potential, and is often quoted with references to his work appearing across a wide swath of international cultural, business, and educational forums from the Kennedy Center for the Arts', interviews with American hip-hop artists and slam poets, international investment conferences, and the pages of international media such as CNET's "Top 10 List: Human Development Gurus" and The Times of India's "Sunday Life" section.

== Death ==
On 1 May 2013, Wilde suffered a heart attack while driving through Ireland. He was 66 years old.

== Principal claims ==
=== Early work ===
Wilde's principal claims are that, while many citizens may seem to be normal, acquiescing to the status quo, there exists a vast population of what he calls Fringe Dwellers whose mind and soul do not align to the constraints of life in regular society that Wilde called Tick-Tock. Wilde believed through use of the theta state of meditation (4–7 cycles per second), humans can better control their emotional life and their bio-rhythms, and begin to see visions, and that those visions and extrasensory feeling will lead to a greater balance and more freedom.

To that end, he emphasized the importance of going beyond the habit of struggling, and advocated the need for financial freedom, themes stated in his books Life was Never Meant to be a Struggle (1987), The Trick to Money is Having Some (1989), and The Little Money Bible (1998).

In Affirmations (1986), Wilde laid out systems of self-talk that empower an individual to change their core beliefs. His book Sixth Sense (2000) discusses practical techniques for developing extrasensory perception.

=== Later Work ===
He earned both praise and criticism for his later works which advanced controversial concepts such as other dimensions, dematerialization, and Morph worlds.

His most avant garde claims are based on the idea that Paul Dirac's hypothesis of parallel antiparticle worlds is, in fact, correct, and that humans adept at trance meditation can become aware of spiritual dimensions placed at 90° from them left and right—dimensions, Wilde said, that follow Hawking's theory of transverse waves of light. Wilde acknowledged there was no empirical data to support his claim, but anecdotal evidence, gathered from more than two-thousand people whom he taught, stated they had experienced such transcendental 90° perception which led him to conclude these worlds exist.

Grace, Gaia, and the End of Days (2009) maps out coordinates for these spiritual dimensions and offers "a twenty-first century understanding of grace and spiritual evolution"—and tools to activate it in one's life. In a 2009 interview Wilde said, "Grace is a golden light, pure love, a divine energy, seen coming from these inner spiritual worlds. It is data-driven and laced with trillions of bits of fractal information that will guide you and help you evolve. The human system is configured to read this fractal data through visions and extra sensory intuitive feelings." Serenity and balance developed through regular trance meditation enable access to this "pure information", which he called stream of consciousness from a "Higher Knowing", "The Source", "God".

While Wilde believed humans are multi-dimensional beings who possess both the celestial light and the dark, he posited they gravitate to one or the other based on inner feelings, thoughts, and actions. The quality of these feelings, moreover, determine the spiritual dimension an aspect of oneself will reside in any moment. Redemption (and a life of love and serenity) is possible for all by choosing the ways of the celestial. On the larger plane, he believed the light will eventually overcome the dark and advised aligning with the forces of light, the forces of God. He laid out techniques for doing so through cultivation of tenderness, generosity, respect, "the soft eye", mindfulness, meditation, time in nature and with animals, and avoidance of dark places, people, and media that sell specialness, fear, degradation, and greed. Move from the cold cerebral mind into the warmth of heart and feeling. "There is strength in softness. Remember, It's all backwards," he was oft quoted as saying.

=== Additional Themes ===
Wilde was a supporter of peace in the world, the command to live and let live, animal rights and vegetarianism. Tom Lishman eulogised him this way—

We must remember that just because he has gone back to the non-physical realm he is still very much with us, we should not forget that his time here was set and agreed upon and he has completed his mission, that being said all fringe dwellers must now rise above the despair and confusion they feel and turn it into positive energy and by doing this they will honour his work in the best possible way. Stuart will be remembered for making a huge contribution towards the new golden age of peace and love that is fast approaching, his followers will indeed take up his torch and light up planet earth like never before. We must ponder this question...What if by him leaving his body at this time he can contribute even more to world peace ?, anyone that knows him will know that he will be doing just that."

== Writings and music ==
Wilde was a prolific writer with 20 books appearing in more than 27 languages. A total of 95 unique titles (books, audio works, music) are in circulation, with several hundred essays and articles in syndication across digital media.

He was executive producer and lyricist on the music album Voice of the Feminine Spirit, which sold several hundred-thousand copies. He later produced and was the lyricist on two albums of Celtic music, Voice of the Celtic Myth (1997), and Creation (1999), and wrote the book and libretto for Tim Wheater's oratorio Heartland (1995). In 2010, his collaboration with Richard Tyler produced the ambient release The Mystery of the Sacred O, an homage "to the earth spirit Gaia and the masculine (Ka), and feminine (Om) creative energies of the Universe."

== Works ==
=== Books ===
- Miracles, (Carlsbad: Hay House, 1983), ISBN 978-1-4019-1790-6, 1-56170-829-1 (PB Rev)
- The Force, (Carlsbad: Hay House, 1984), ISBN 978-1-56170-166-7, 1-56170-166-1 (PB)
- Affirmations, (Carlsbad: Hay House, 1986), ISBN 978-1-56170-167-4, 1-56170-167-X (PB), ISBN 978-0-930603-02-1 (HC)
- Life Was Never Meant to Be a Struggle, (Carlsbad: Hay House, 1987), ISBN 978-1-56170-829-1 (PB)
- The Quickening, (Carlsbad: Hay House, 1988), ISBN 978-1-56170-165-0 (PB)
- The Trick to Money is Having Some, (Carlsbad: Hay House, 1989), ISBN 978-1-56170-168-1, 1-56170-168-8 (PB)
- The Secrets of Life, (Carlsbad: Hay House, 1990) ISBN 978-1-4019-0736-5, 1-4019-0736-9 (PB)
- Whispering Winds of Change: Perceptions of a New World, (Carlsbad: Hay House 1993), ISBN 978-1-56170-160-5, 1-56170-537-3 (PB)
- Weight Loss for the Mind, (Carlsbad: Hay House, 1994), ISBN 978-1-56170-537-5 (PB)
- Infinite Self: 33 Steps to Reclaiming Your Inner Power, (Carlsbad: Hay House, 1995), ISBN 978-1-56170-349-4, 1561703494 (PB)
- Silent Power, (Carlsbad: Hay House, 1996), ISBN 978-1-56170-536-8, 1561705365 (PB), ISBN 978-1-4019-0511-8 (HC)
- The Little Money Bible: The Ten Laws of Abundance, (Carlsbad: Hay House, 1998), ISBN 978-1-56170-829-1, 1561708291 (PB)
- Simply Wilde: Discover the Wisdom that Is, (written with Leon Nacson), (Carlsbad: Hay House, 1999), ISBN 978-1-56170-620-4 (PB)
- Sixth Sense: Including the Secrets of the Etheric Subtle Body, (Carlsbad: Hay House, 2000), ISBN 978-1-56170-501-6 (PB)
- Wilde Unplugged: A Dictionary of Life (written with Brooke Claussen) (2002)(ebook)
- God's Gladiators, (Brookemark, 2003), ISBN 978-0-9714396-3-4 (PB), (ebook)
- The Three Keys to Self-Empowerment, (Carlsbad: Hay House, 2004), ISBN 978-1-4019-0350-3
- The Art of Redemption, (Carlsbad: Hay House, 2007), ISBN 978-1-4019-1754-8 (PB)
- Grace, Gaia and the End of Days (with essay by Khris Krepcik), (Carlsbad: Hay House, 2009), ISBN 978-1-4019-2006-7 (PB)
- Plum Red: Taoist Tales of Old China (Tolemac Canada, 2010), ISBN 978-0-9867300-0-9

=== Audio works ===
Lectures, audiobooks, subliminal productions. (Partial list)

- Attracting Money (Quiet Earth, 1986), UPC 9320170000596
- The Human Aura (Quiet Earth, 1985), UPC 9320170000619
- Affirmations, (Quiet Earth, 1986), UPC 9320170000671
- Ancient Wisdoms, (Quiet Earth, 1986), UPC 9320170000626
- Freedom, (Quiet Earth, 1986), UPC 9320170000589
- The Mind, (Quiet Earth, 1986), UPC 9320170000633
- Miracles, (Carlsbad: Hay House, 1988), ISBN 978-1-4019-0667-2
- Assertiveness, (Quiet Earth, 1989), UPC 9320170000664
- Developing More Self Confidence, (Quiet Earth, 1989), UPC 9320170000565
- Dream Power, (Quiet Earth, 1989), UPC 9320170000602
- Joy, (Quiet Earth, 1989), UPC 9320170000572
- Camelot, (Quiet Earth, 1989), UPC 9320170000688
- The Force, (Carlsbad: Hay House, 1996), ISBN 978-1-4019-0675-7
- Infinite Self: 33 Steps to Reclaiming Your Infinite Power], (Nightingale Conant, 1996) ASIN B000UY0Z8S
- Intuition, (Carlsbad: Hay House, 1996), ISBN 978-1-4019-0674-0
- Developing the Sixth Sense, (Quiet Earth, 1987), UPC 9320170000718
- Life Was Never Meant to Be a Struggle (Carlsbad: Hay House, 1997), ISBN 978-1-4019-0452-4
- The Mastery of Money, (Quiet Earth, 1989), UPC 9320170000749
- Masculine and Feminine Spirituality, (Quiet Earth, 1989), UPC 9320170000763
- Custodians of Light, (Quiet Earth, 1989), UPC 9320170000756
- Silent Power, (Carlsbad: Hay House, 1997), ISBN 978-1-4019-0658-0
- Channeling and Your Spiritual Quest, (Quiet Earth, 1988), UPC 9320170000732
- The Little Money Bible, (Carlsbad: Hay House, 1998), ISBN 978-1-4019-0671-9
- The Journey Beyond Enlightenment, (Nightingale Conant, 2005)
- The Fringe Dweller's Guide to Almost Everything, (Tolemac Canada, 2012) ISBN 978-0-9867300-0-9

Meditations, brainwave metronomes. (Partial list)

- Trance States, (Quiet Earth, 1990), UPC 9320170000428
- Meditation on the Edge, (Quiet Earth, 1990), UPC 9320170000435
- The Art of Meditation, (Quiet Earth, 1996), UPC 9320170000862
- Higher Self, (Quiet Earth, 1989), UPC 9320170000442
- Where the Raven Lands, (Quiet Earth, 1996), UPC 9320170000503
- Heartbeat Meditation
- Etruscan Healing Meditation, (Tyler/Wilde) (2010)
- Avalon Protection Prayer, (Tyler/Wilde) (2010)
- Gayatri Mantra Meditation, (Tyler/Wilde) (2010)

=== Music ===
(Partial list)

- Voice of the Feminine Spirit, (Preston/Wheater/Wilde featuring Cecelia) (1994)
- Heartland, (Lord/Wheater/Wilde) (1995)
- Voice of Violet 19, (Lord/Wilde featuring Cecelia) (1996)
- Voice of the Celtic Myth, (Greenwood/Wilde featuring Cecelia) (1997)
- Creation (1999)
- Where the Raven Lands (2006)
- The Mystery of the Sacred O, (Tyler/Wilde featuring Sarah Leonard) (2010)

=== Film ===
- Five Walking, (Tolemac Films Ltd) (2011)
- Snowball, (Constantin Film AG) (2011)

=== Video ===
Selected lectures, music and tone poems. (Partial list)

- The Hand, (Tyler/Wilde) (2:10 mins)
- Perception & Sensuality, (Tyler/Wilde) (2:31 mins)
- Gayatri Mantra Honouring the Gods (Tyler/Wilde) (3:00 min)
- The Tears of Gaia (4:59 mins)
- Spiritual Evolution of Dogs (1:53 mins)
- The Love of Trees (3:17 mins)
- Stuart Wilde: The Mastery of Money (70:37 mins) on YouTube

=== Articles and teachings ===
Selected writings from collections of articles and essays at stuartwilde.com, thesacredtearsofgaia.com, thehoodedsage.com, and zenhaven.com:

- "Communicating Silently"
- "Heightened Perception", and "Etheric Life Force Field"
- "Water and Information", "The Color of Music"
- “Triumph”
- "Getting What You Want – A Handy Trick"
- "The Tao Philosophy of Detachment"
- “Infinite Self: Reclaim Your Inner Power”
- "Silent Power", "Power Spot", and "Softness"
- "Meditation: Moving from Ego to Spirit"
- “Process Fear Easily”
- "Perceptions", and "Courage to Succeed"
- "The New Dignity", "Heart Waves", and "Divinity"
- "Romanticism—Why Its a Cure"
- "Believing"
- "The Spiritual Evolution of Animals"
- "The Matrix Revisited"
- "Matrix & the Rabbit Hole"
- "Protection", "Softness and Beauty"
- "Journey to a Far Away Land"
- "Emotional Techniques for Healing Yourself"
- “More on the Spiritual Evolution of Animals”
- "Evolution of the Species: The Fourth Alternative"
- “How to Make Your Prayers More Successful"
- “A Stuie All Time Favorite . . . “
- "Help Your Heart", Love & Laughter"
- “The Mysterious Gardener”
- "The Messiah's New Brightness"
- "The Normality of Change"

== See also ==
- Taoism
- Eckhart Tolle
