= Sacred Songs of Mary =

Studio album by Various Artists
- Released: October 12, 2010
- Genre: Christian, classical, inspirational, new-age, early music
- Label: Valley Entertainment
- Producer: Ellen Holmes

Various Artists chronology
Music of Grace: Amazing Grace (2009)	Sacred Songs of Mary (2010)	Sacred Songs of Mary 2 (2014)

Sacred Songs of Mary is a 2010 compilation album from Valley Entertainment featuring music devoted to Mary (mother of Jesus).

== Track listing ==
No.	Title	Performer(s)	Length
1.	"O Maria, Stella Maris"	Trio Mediaeval	3:50
2.	"Ave Maria"	Elisabeth Andreassen and Jan Werner Danielsen	4:17
3.	"Virdissima"	Jocelyn Montgomery	5:08
4.	"Et Lidet Barn Saa Lystelig"	Anne-Lise Berntsen and Nils Henrik Asheim	4:02
5.	"Magnificat (Excerpt)"	Miah Persson, Yukari Nonishita, Akira Tachikawa, Bach Collegium Japan	2:06
6.	"Cavatina: "Se D'un Dio Fui Fatta Madre""	Anne Sofie von Otter and Musica Antiqua Köln	3:40
7.	"Ave Maris Stella (Hymn from Vespers of the Blessed Virgin)"	The King's Consort	9:05
8.	"Pavan: The Cradle"	The Rose Consort of Viols	3:50
9.	"Ave Maria"	Ashana	9:42
10.	"Regina Coeli"	Huelgas Ensemble	6:12
11.	"Nesciens Mater"	The Monteverdi Choir	6:51
12.	"Lux Aurumque"	UNLV Wind Orchestra	4:48
13.	"Ave Maria (Méditation sur le 1er Prélude)"	Anne-Maria O'Farrell and Aisling Drury Byrne	2:54
