= David Cullen (musician) =

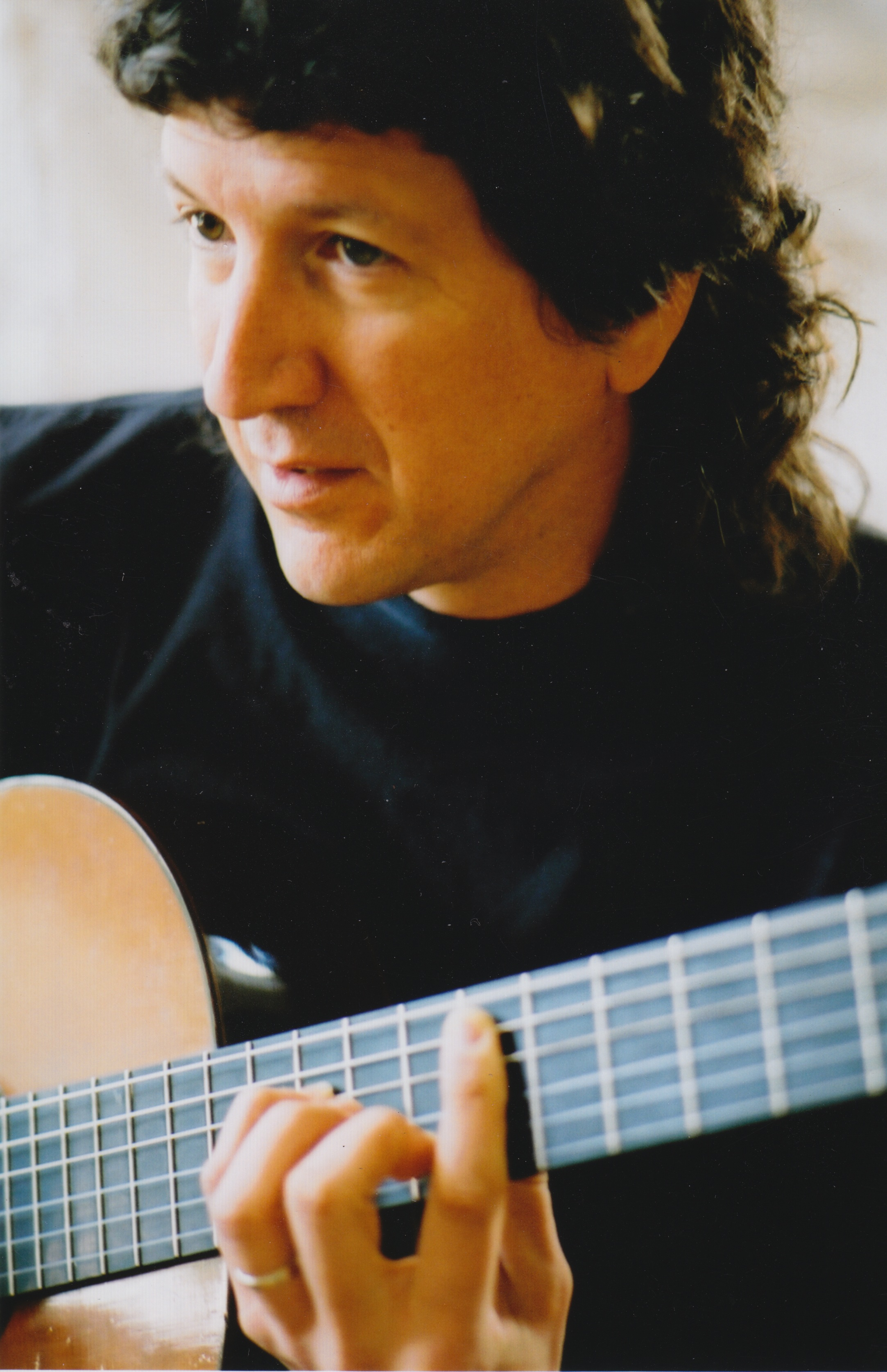
- Cullen performing in March 2004

Background information
- Born: March 19, 1959 (age 66); Natick, Massachusetts, U.S.
- Genres: Jazz, classical, world
- Occupation: Musician
- Instrument: Guitar
- Labels: Windham Hill, Solid Air
- Website: www.cullenguitar.com

David Thompson Cullen (born March 19, 1959) is an American guitarist, composer, and arranger of various styles of guitar music, including classical, jazz, and world music. He is an artist in residence at Elizabethtown College in Elizabethtown, Pennsylvania.

== Biography ==
Cullen began playing guitar at age seven. He joined a rock band at 14 before taking up the classical guitar at 15. From 1977 to 1981, he attended the Hartt School of Music at the University of Hartford. Notable performances include a New York debut recital for the American Institute of Guitar's International Guitar Festival in 1985, a Merkin Concert Hall live broadcast for WNYC in 1988, and the 92nd Street Y New York Guitar Festival in 2004. He is an Artist in Residence at Elizabethtown College and teaches jazz and classical guitar at Kutztown University of Pennsylvania, Millersville University, and West Chester University.

== Discography ==
- 2000 One Night, One Guitar (Solid Air)
- 2001 Indigo Blue (Solid Air)
- 2001 Equilibré with Michael Manring (Solid Air)
- 2001 Classical Jazz (Solid Air)
- 2001 Holiday Guitar (Solid Air)
- 2002 Exploding Colors (Solid Air)
- 2002 In the Pocket (Solid Air)
- 2002 The Collection (Solid Air)
- 2003 Grateful Guitar (Solid Air)
- 2008 Guitar Travels (Solid Air)

Appearances

- 1997 Windham Hill Records Guitar Sampler (Various Artists) (Windham Hill)
- 2004 Henry Mancini: Pink Guitar (Various Artists) (Solid Air)
- 2007 Woodsongs (Various Artists) (New Land Music)
