= Al Petteway =

American guitarist

Al Petteway was an American guitarist known primarily for his acoustic fingerstyle work both as a soloist and with well-known folk artists such as Amy White, Tom Paxton, Jethro Burns, Jonathan Edwards, Cheryl Wheeler, Debi Smith, Bonnie Rideout, Maggie Sansone and many others. His own compositions rely heavily on Celtic and Appalachian influences and he is known for his use of DADGAD tuning.

== Biography ==
Petteway's music has been featured on NPR and on PBS television specials by Ken Burns, most notably The National Parks: America's Best Idea (2009). His recordings, music books, and instructional videotapes have gained him a large following of devoted fans around the globe. His playing is featured on more than sixty recordings by some of the world's best known folk and Celtic musicians. Since 1996, he performed exclusively with his wife, Amy White. They were Artists in Residence at The Kennedy Center and at Warren Wilson College. Petteway was the Guitar Week coordinator for the world-famous "Swannanoa Gathering" music camp at Warren Wilson College near Asheville, N.C.

In 2005, Al Petteway's rendition of "The Thornbirds" appeared on the Grammy Award-winning compilation of solo guitar renditions of Henry Mancini compositions titled Henry Mancini: Pink Guitar. Before that he and Amy were awarded an Indie award for their duo guitar album Gratitude. Al Petteway was awarded 45 "Wammies" by the Washington Area Music Association including the top honors of "Artist of the Year" and "Musician of the Year". He was the recipient of two Maryland State Arts Council Individual Artist Awards for Music Composition and performed at the Vice President's House and The White House during the Clinton administration.

In 2012, he was given the "Master Music Makers" award by Warren Wilson College and the Swannanoa Gathering.

Petteway lived with his wife Amy White near Asheville, North Carolina. He died on 25 September 2023.

== Discography ==
- 1993: The Waters and the Wild (Maggie's Music)
- 1994: Whispering Stones (Maggie's Music)
- 1995: Midsummer Moon (Maggie's Music)
- 1996: A Scottish Christmas (Maggie's Music)
- 1997: Caledon Wood (Maggie's Music)
- 1999: Racing Hearts (Fairewood Records)
- 2001: Gratitude (Solid Air Records)
- 2003: Shades of Blue (Solid Air Records)
- 2003: A Midnight Clear (Dorian Records)
- 2004: Celtic, Blues and Beyond DVD, Book, Cd (Warner Bros./Solid Air Records)
- 2004: Acoustic Journey (Maggie's Music)
- 2005: Land of the Sky (Maggie's Music)
- 2006: Winter Tidings (Maggie's Music)
- 2008: Dream Guitars, Vol. I – The Golden Age of Lutherie (Dream Guitars, Inc.)
- 2010: "High in the Blue Ridge" (Fairewood Studios)
- 2012: "It's Only The Blues" (Fairewood Studios)
- 2012: "Home, Sweet Home -Songs of Love, Loss and Belonging" (Fairewood Studios)
- 2014: "Mountain Guitar" (Fairewood Studios)
- 2015: "Dream Guitars, Vol II – Hand Picked" (Dream Guitars, Inc.)
- 2018: "The Collector’s Passion" (Fairewood Studios)

Al Petteway Instructional DVDs:

- Blues Guitar Arrangements in DADGAD Tuning
- Appalachian Fingerstyle in DADGAD Tuning (Vol. I & II)
- Celtic Instrumentals For Fingerstyle Guitar Vol. I (DADGAD)
- Celtic Instrumentals For Fingerstyle Guitar Vol. II (Alternate Tunings)
- Celtic, Blues & Beyond
- DADGAD Guitar Solos (with Doug Smith & Lawrence Juber)
- Acoustic Blues Solos (with Kenny Sultan & Mike Dowling)
- Al Petteway Music Folio and Instructional CDs

From Solid Air Records/Alfred Publications:

- Celtic, Blues & Beyond – Al Petteway
- Acoustic Blues Solos – Al Petteway, Kenny Sultan, Mike Dowling
- DADGAD Guitar Solos – Al Petteway, Doug Smith, Lawrence Juber
- Pink Guitar – The Music of Henry Mancini

Music Books from Mel Bay Publications:

- MBGU Fingerstyle Curriculum: Contemporary Solos (Book/CD Set)

Al Petteway Music Books:

- The Waters and The Wild
- Whispering Stones
- Midsummer Moon
- Caledon Wood
- A Scottish Christmas for Guitar
- Al Petteway Music Books Available as PDF's
- It's Only The Blues
- Dream Guitars, Vol. I
- Dream Guitars, Vol. II
- The Collector's Passion
