= Breedlove Guitars =

American musical instrument maker

- Company type: Privately held company
- Industry: Musical instrument
- Founded: 1990; 36 years ago
- Founder: Larry Breedlove and Steve Henderson
- Headquarters: Bend, Oregon, United States
- Key people: Kim Breedlove; Tom Bedell; Angela Christensen
- Products: Acoustic guitars; 12-string guitars; Acoustic bass guitars; Ukuleles; Mandolins (discontinued); Electric guitars (discontinued); Lap steel guitars (discontinued)
- Parent: Two Old Hippies LLC
- Website: breedlovemusic.com

Breedlove Guitars is an American acoustic instrument company based in Bend, Oregon. Breedlove produces acoustic guitars, acoustic bass guitars, and ukuleles.

== History and background ==
Breedlove Guitars was established In 1990 by California luthiers Larry Breedlove and Steve Henderson, who left their jobs at Taylor Guitars to create what would become Breedlove Guitars. Their intention was to produce guitars that merged traditional guitar making skills with modern technology. After moving to Tumalo, Oregon, Breedlove and Henderson began specializing in custom, fingerstyle six and twelve string guitars.

In 1991 the first Breedlove guitar model appeared, the shallow body C-10. At the 1992 NAMM Show, Breedlove and Henderson unveiled five models and three body types. Around 1994, Larry's older brother, Kim Breedlove, joined Larry and Steve as a master craftsman and Larry returned to work at Taylor Guitars. Other master luthiers at Breedlove included Terry Myers, who also left Taylor Guitars in the early 1990s then returned, as well as later luthiers Jayson Bowerman, Aaron Adams, and Chris Lindquist.

In 1999, Breedlove suffered a financial setback and hired a new president, Peter Newport, who invested in the company and expanded the company's model lines. In 2001, founder Steve Henderson quit the company due to disagreements with Newport. In 2003, under Newport's direction, Breedlove launched its first series of Imported guitars, the Atlas line which was manufactured in Korea. In 2004 the company launched its first traditional designs not focused on fingerstyle playing, the Revival line which included dreadnoughts and orchestra models, which departed from Breedlove's history of original designs.

In 2008, Breedlove relocated from Tumalo, Oregon to Bend, Oregon. In 2010, Breedlove experienced its second financial setback when president and investor Peter Newport was unable to raise additional capital due to the 2008 financial crisis, and ultimately sold Breedlove to Tom and Molly Bedell's Two Old Hippies LLC of Bend, OR, which owned Tom Bedell Guitars and Great Divide Guitars, as well as retail stores. In 2012, the combined company moved to a larger facility in Bend, which produces about 2,000 guitars a year as of 2020.

In 2013, Breedlove completed the purchase of the world's largest collection of legal, CITES-compliant Brazilian Rosewood for use on the company's highest-quality instruments. Beginning with 2014 models, Breedlove changed its headstock logo from a stylized "B" to fully spelling out "Breedlove" in a script logo and made numerous changes to the model lineup, including launching several new series of instruments and discontinuing the Revival series of traditional body shapes. In 2015, Breedlove produced a limited run of 25th Anniversary guitars, including a Kim Breedlove Signature, a Brazilian Concert, an Oregon Concert, and a Pursuit Koa.

In 2017, Breedlove made significant strategic changes, including the announcement of the new Concerto and Concertina body shapes, the simplification of the company's model lines and body shapes, the introduction of a Sound Optimization process (replacing the long-standing bridge truss and graduated top design used on its premium models), and the introduction of the Tonewood Certification Program for sustainable forest practices.

In 2020, Breedlove announced a partnership with actor Jeff Bridges to produce a signature model guitar that was sustainably sourced. Later that year, two additional Jeff Bridges models were announced. In 2021, Breedlove announced a limited run of four 30th Anniversary guitars, including a Northwest Classic, King Koa, Focus, and Phoenix, each based on a different model from Breedlove's past.

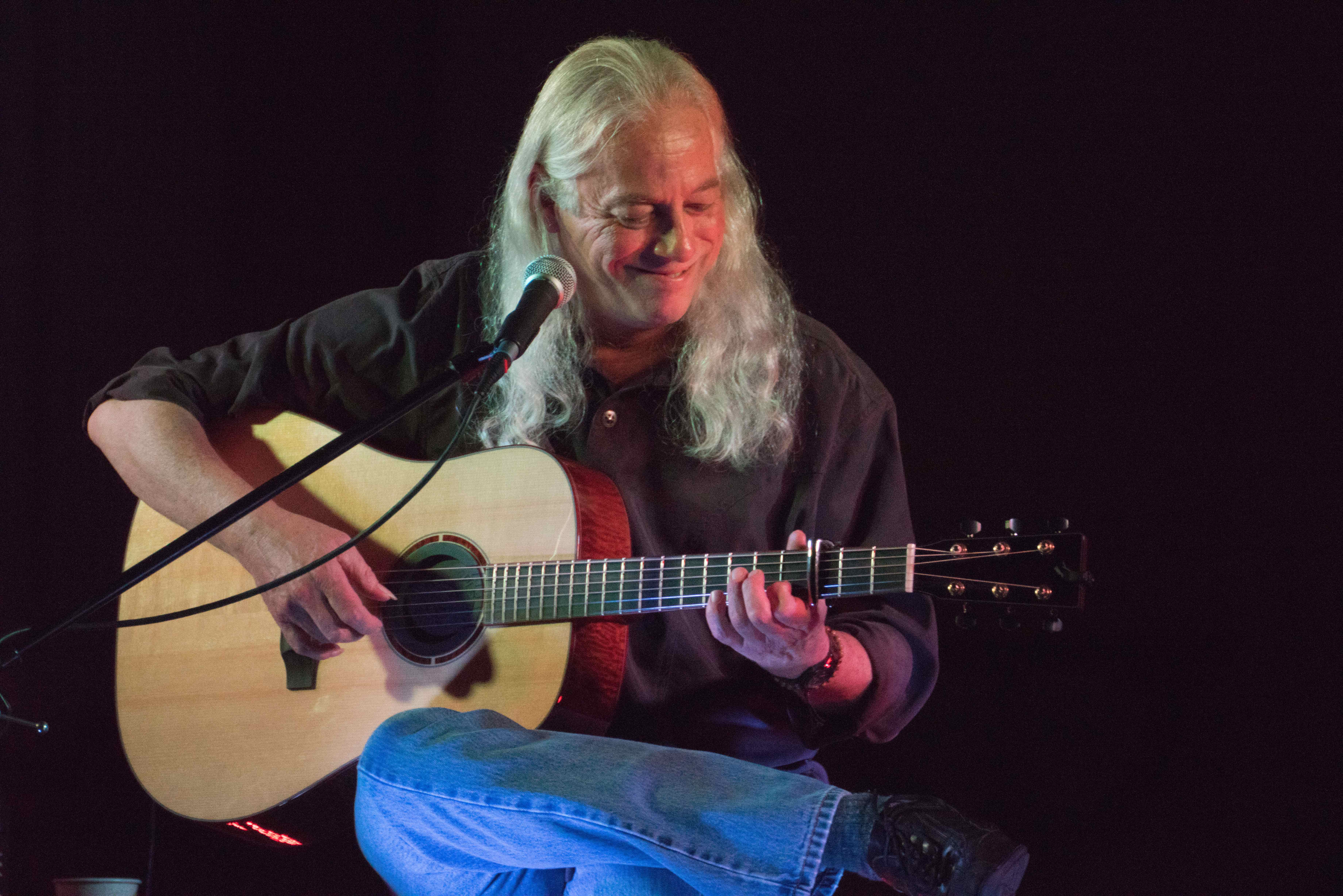
Grammy Award-winning guitarist Ed Gerhard playing a Breedlove dreadnought guitar at the Canadian Guitar Festival in 2014

== Current guitar models ==
=== Guitar body shapes ===
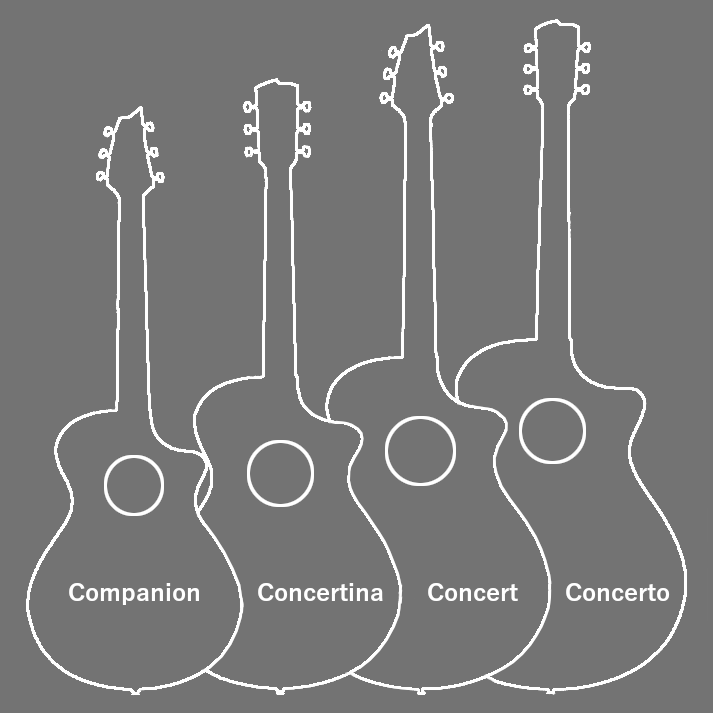
Breedlove guitar body shapes as of 2021

As of 2021, Breedlove offers four guitar body shapes in ascending order of size:

- Companion: A travel/parlor guitar with a 13.5 inch lower bout, 14 frets to the body, a 23.5 inch scale length, and a body depth of 3.25–4.00 inches. Introduced in 2020.
- Concertina: A small-bodied guitar with a 14.75 inch lower bout, 12 frets to the body, a 25-inch scale length, and a body depth of 3.25–4.00 inches. Introduced in 2018, replacing Parlor shape.
- Concert: A medium-bodied guitar with a 15-inch lower bout, 14 frets to the body, a 25.5 inch scale length, and a body depth of 3.75–4.50 inches. The Concert is Breedlove's most popular body shape, dating back to 1991.
- Concerto: A large-bodied guitar with a 16-inch lower bout, 14 frets to the body, and a 25.5 inch scale length, and a body depth of 4.00–5.00 inches. Introduced in 2017, replacing Dreadnought, Jumbo, and Auditorium shapes. A Concerto cutaway model was introduced in 2018.

=== Oregon-built guitar series ===
Breedlove's Masterclass, Legacy, Premier, and Oregon models, as well as some premium Signature models, are made in Bend, Oregon and are hand-voiced using the Sound Optimization System.

- Masterclass: Formerly a high-end production line dating back to the founding of the company, now a reserved name for Breedlove Custom Shop models and limited editions.
- Signature: Launched 2020 as a partnership with actor Jeff Bridges to produce a signature model guitar that was sustainably sourced. Past Signature Series artists include Ed Gerhard, Richard Gilewitz, Chris Hillman, and for the 25th anniversary edition, Kim Breedlove.
- Legacy: Launched in 2014, highest-quality production models, typically using exotic tonewoods such as Adirondack Spruce, Cocobolo, sinker redwood, and koa.
- Premier: Launched in 2014, professional-grade models, typically using traditional tonewoods such as Sitka Spruce and East Indian Rosewood.
- Oregon: Launched in 2012, professional-grade models that use Myrtlewood either for both the top and the back/sides, or just the back/sides.

=== Imported guitar series ===
Breedlove's Organic, Solo, Pursuit, and Discovery series are made in Asia, typically in South Korea or China depending on the model and year. They do not have hand-voicing using the Sound Optimization System but have designs based on Breedlove's research on this system.

- Organic: Launched in early 2020, this series of sustainably-sourced, all-solid-wood guitars features FSC-certified exotic tonewoods and Oregon Myrtlewood. This collection also includes Jeff Bridges "Organic Signature" models.
- Solo: Re-launched in 2014 to add a sound hole in the top side that enables the player to listen directly to the instrument, using solid wood tops with laminate backs and sides.
- Pursuit: Launched in 2014 with solid wood tops with laminate backs and sides.
- Discovery: Launched in 2014 with solid wood tops with laminate backs and sides.

== See also ==
- List of companies based in Oregon
