= Sacred Songs of Mary 2 =

Studio album by Various Artists
- Released: October 13, 2014
- Genre: Christian, classical, I=inspirational, new-age, early music
- Label: Valley Entertainment
- Producer: Ellen Holmes

Various Artists chronology
Sacred Songs of Mary	Sacred Songs of Mary 2

Sacred Songs of Mary 2, the second volume of the series, is a 2014 compilation album from Valley Entertainment featuring music devoted to Mary (mother of Jesus).

== Track listing ==
No.	Title	Performer(s)	Length
1.	"Ave Maris Stella"	Chor Leoni Men's Choir	3:27
2.	"Ave Maria"	Weser-Renaissance	6:16
3.	"O Maria Vernans Rosa"	The Monteverdi Choir	5:51
4.	"Ave Maria"	A Sei Voci	6:24
5.	"Ave Maris Stella from Six Latin Hymns"	Eric Ericson’s Chamber Choir	5:14
6.	"Concord"	Matthew Barley	2:29
7.	"Ave Maria"	Westminster Cathedral Choir	6:04
8.	"Stabat Mater"	Harmony of Voices	7:01
9.	"Salve Regina"	Concerto Delle Donne	7:18
10.	"Symphony No. 3, II. Lento e largo"	Zofia Kilanowicz with the Polish National Radio Symphony Orchestra	10:21
11.	"Caoineadh Mhuire (Mary’s Lament)"	Teresa Doyle	4:24
12.	"Ave Maria"	Lisbeth Scott	5:23
