= MacDonald Brothers =

Scottish musicians

The MacDonald Brothers are pipers and folk musicians from Scotland.

The three brothers, Angus, Allan (born 1956) and Iain grew up in Glenuig, a small Gaelic-speaking community in the west Highlands of Scotland. They have an older sister, Alexandra. Their father, Ronald, was known as "The Whaler," (after spending years whaling) and now the three brothers are often referred to as "The Whaler Brothers". The three brothers are all involved in the Scottish music scene.

All three brothers studied under Pipe Major John M. MacKenzie at Queen Victoria School, Dunblane. Iain was later taught by Duncan Johnstone and Roderick MacDonald in South Uist, and at one time was musician in residence at Sabhal Mòr Ostaig. He currently tutors at Lews Castle College UHI, Benbecula and is Ceolas's artistic director. Allan has worked in the School of Scottish Studies and taught piping at the Royal Scottish Academy of Music and Drama. He also taught at the National Piping Centre in Glasgow. Angus has practised as a doctor in Cape Breton and in Skye, and is involved with the Donald MacDonald Quaich and the John MacFadyen Memorial Piping Trust.

The MacDonald brothers are known as activists for the Gaelic language. They were involved in the Ceartas protest in 1981.

Ceòl mo Bhràthair (My Brother's Music), a television programme celebrating the music and lives of the three brothers, was broadcast by BBC Scotland in January 2007.

Angus's son, Allan, was the piper and multi-instrumentalist in Niteworks.
