= Cecilia (Norwegian singer) =

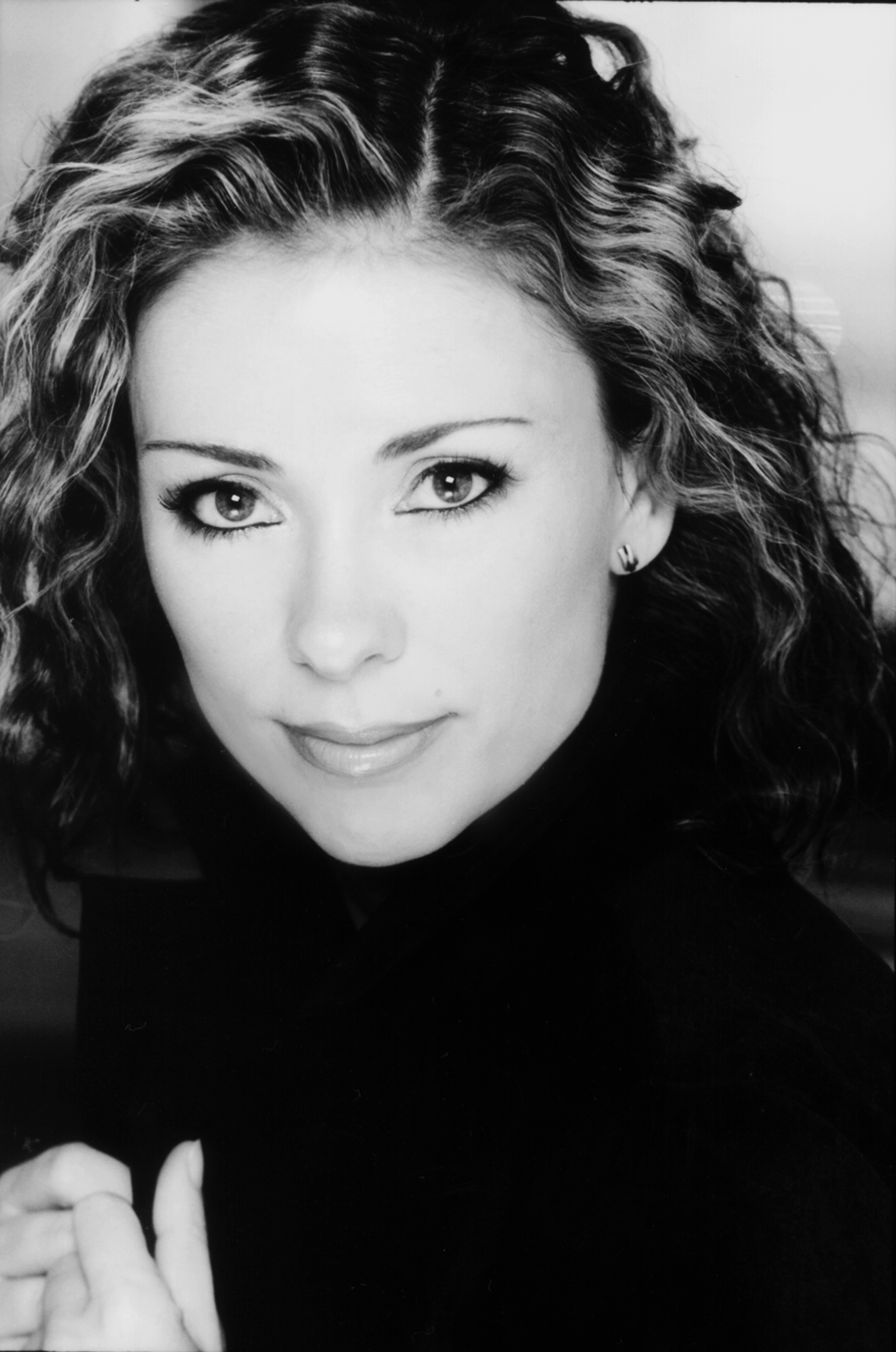
- Cecilia, known for her rendering of "Amazing Grace"

Background information
- Born: Harstad, Troms, Norway
- Genres: Classical crossover, new-age
- Occupation: Singer
- Years active: 1994–present
- Labels: Tolemac International; Universal Music; Northern Light Music
- Website: ceciliasings.com

Cecilia is a classical crossover singer, originally from Norway, who is known for her rendition of "Amazing Grace". She has released seven albums, two via Universal Music, and performed worldwide, selling several hundred thousand albums with virtually no mainstream publicity.

== Early life ==
Cecilia grew up in the small town of Harstad, in Norway in the Arctic Circle, the 'land of the midnight sun'. She wanted to become an opera singer after seeing a television broadcast of the opera Aida, when she was 9 years old. Her graduation marks from the Conservatory of Music in Oslo, Norway, were (extremely rare) perfect scores. She studied for 6 years in conservatories in Norway, Denmark and Germany.

She then moved to New York City to study with Oren Brown, a vocal coach renowned to help a singer 'discover their natural voice'. In April 2002, upon Luciano Pavarotti's suggestion and referral, she began to study with Dr. William Riley, coach of Celine Dion, and worked with Pavarotti and Andrea Bocelli, and even Bill Clinton.

== Career ==
Cecilia has toured with Hay House published authors, such as Dr. Wayne Dyer, Dr. Deepak Chopra, Louise Hay, Marianne Williamson and Stuart Wilde, and performed in Norway, Japan, England, Germany, Sweden, Denmark, Finland and the United States. She has performed at large venues including the Hollywood Palladium in Los Angeles and the Miami Arena, Miami, Florida.

She was discovered in 1994 by the British writer Stuart Wilde, who was behind her first two albums, Voice of the Feminine Spirit and Voice of Violet 19.

Cecilia opened the new millennium by singing at the Deepak Chopra Millennium event, where the Dalai Lama gave a speech. She sang at the 2002 Salt Lake City Winter Olympics, where she also performed a concert at the World of Ice, and sang for the Crown Prince, Crown Princess and King of Norway.

Norwegian National TV (NRK) made a music video of a song Cecilia co-wrote, titled "My Beloved". It was filmed at the top of the Olympic Mountains.

== Other activities ==
Cecilia supports Plan International, personally sponsoring a child in Nepal. She supports the Norwegian Federation for Animal Protection. She has also performed for the benefit of the Linda McCartney Cancer Foundation. Her activities with the charity stem from her own experiences, as she lost her mother to the disease.

== Discography ==
=== Albums ===
1994 – Voice of the Feminine Spirit

Track listing:
1. Solveig's Song First Verse
2. The Sacred Hum
3. Love of a Silent Moon
4. Two Swans Matched in Flight
5. Daughter of the Midnight Sun
6. Amazing Grace
7. Silver Wings
8. The Lion and the Unicorn
9. The Eternal Heartbeat
10. Unite the Tribe
11. Solveig's Song, 2nd verse

1996 – Voice of Violet 19

Track listing:
1. When You Wish Upon A Star
2. Violet 19
3. Star Child
4. Lightness of Being
5. The Protection Song
6. Pavane Pour Une Infante Defunte
7. The Tracker's Song
8. My Boy Hero
9. Eg veit i himmerik ei borg
10. The Snow Leopard's Prayer
11. The Riddle

1999 – Inner Harmony
also contains lyrics by Deepak Chopra and James Redfield.

Track listing:
1. Fly Away
2. Losing faith
3. We Have Met Before
4. The Prayer
5. Today
6. Wisdom of Your Heart
7. Inner Harmony
8. Carpe Diem
9. Å eg veit meg eit land
10. In Dreams
11. Angel of Love

2001 – Let There Be Peace On Earth (Discontinued)

2003 – Best of Cecilia

Track listing:
1. The Sacred Hum
2. Love of a Silent Moon
3. Daughter of the Midnight Sun
4. Amazing Grace
5. Unite the Tribe
6. When You Wish Upon A Star
7. The Protection Song
8. Pavane Pour Une Infante Defunte
9. The Tracker's Song
10. Fly Away
11. Today
12. Inner Harmony
13. In Dreams
14. Angel of Love

2006 – The Healing Voice

Track listing:
1. Ave
2. Going Home
3. Domine
4. The Prayer
5. Credo
6. Ave Maria
7. Soul of the World
8. Mea Culpa
9. Pie Jesu
10. Anahata
11. The Magic
12. Amen

2007 – Amazing Grace

Track listing:
1. Amazing Grace
2. Prayer of St Francis
3. You Raise Me Up
4. Angel
5. From a Distance
6. Ave Maria
7. Over the Rainbow
8. I Believe
9. May It Be
10. The Roe

=== Other Album Performances ===
Cecilia was the lead soprano on the album by the renowned and award winning flutist and composer Tim Wheater.

Heart Land by Tim Wheater (released 1995)

Voices – "18 of the Most Beautiful Voices in the World" Compilation (This album was released by Universal Music Korea 2004)

"The Eternal Heartbeat" by Cecilia

Includes singers as Luciano Pavarotti, Josh Groban, José Carreras, Sarah Brightman and Russell Watson.
