= Ossian (band) =

Scottish traditional music group

Ossian are a Scottish traditional music group, formed in 1976.

The initial line-up brought together Billy Ross and former members of the group Contraband, Billy Jackson, John Martin, and George Jackson. One of their earliest gigs was at the 1976 Kinross Folk Festival.

Each of the members was a multi-instrumentalist and singer. Their arrangements of songs, slow airs and dance tunes were meticulous, almost a chamber music approach to Scottish music. They sang in English, Scots, and Gaelic.

Billy Jackson's wire-strung harp, the clàrsach, featured in most pieces, but he also played uilleann (Irish) pipes and whistles. John Martin, who played fiddle and cello, went on to become a member of The Tannahill Weavers. George Jackson (brother of Billy) played guitar, cittern, mandolin, fiddle, whistle and flute. Billy Ross was the main singer who played guitar, dulcimer and whistle.

Their first two LPs were Ossian (1977) and St. Kilda Wedding (1978). Billy Ross left the band in 1980, and was replaced by Tony Cuffe as lead vocalist, also playing guitar and whistle. In 1981, Iain MacDonald joined, playing highland pipes, flute, and whistle. They broke up in 1989 when Tony Cuffe and William Jackson moved to the U.S.

In 1997, Billy Jackson reformed the band with the original singer, Billy Ross. They released a CD and performed some gigs for a time.

== Discography ==
- Ossian - Springthyme Records SPR 1004 (1977)
- St. Kilda Wedding - Iona Records IR001 (1978)
- Seal Song - Iona Records IR002 (1981)
- Dove Across the Water - Iona Records IR004 (1982)
- Borders - Iona Records IR007 (1984)
- Light On a Distant Shore - Iona Records IR009 (1986)
- The Carrying Stream - Greentrax CDTRAX 127 (1997)

== See also ==
- Years 1970 - 1979 in Scottish music
