= Henry Mancini: Pink Guitar =

Compilation album by Various artists
- Released: August 17, 2004
- Label: Solid Air
- Producer: James R. Jensen

Henry Mancini: Pink Guitar is a compilation album of popular works by Henry Mancini, produced by James R. Jensen and released through Solid Air Records in 2004. Jensen asked guitar players on his record label to contribute some of their favorite compositions to the album. In 2005, the album won Jensen the Grammy Award for Best Pop Instrumental Album.

== Reception ==
Professional ratings
Review scores
Source	Rating
Allmusic	3/5 stars
Minor 7th	(favorable)

== Track listing ==
1. "Pink Panther Theme" (Henry Mancini), performed by Laurence Juber – 2:31
2. "Moon River" (Mancini, Johnny Mercer), performed by Edward Gerhard – 2:21
3. "The Days of Wine and Roses" (Mancini, Mercer), performed by David Cullen – 4:32
4. "It's Easy to Say" (Mancini, Robert Wells), performed by Doug Smith – 3:39
5. "Peter Gunn", performed by Pat Donohue – 1:55
6. "The Thorn Birds", performed by Al Petteway – 5:28
7. "The Sweetheart Tree" (Mancini, Mercer), performed by Mark Hanson – 3:55
8. "What's Happening!!", performed by Mike Dowling – 3:22
9. "Charade" (Mancini, Mercer), performed by Aaron Stang – 4:06
10. "Dear Heart" (Mancini, Ray Evans, Jay Livingston), performed by Wayne Johnson – 4:57
11. "Baby Elephant Walk", performed by William Coulter – 2:30
12. "Two for the Road" (Mancini, Leslie Bricusse), performed by Amrit Sond – 2:56
13. "A Shot in the Dark", performed by Mark Hanson and Doug Smith – 2:49

== Personnel ==
- William Coulter – guitar
- David Cullen – guitar
- Pat Donohue – guitar
- Mike Dowling – guitar
- Edward Gerhard – guitar
- Mark Hanson – guitar
- James Jensen – executive producer, liner notes
- Wayne Johnson – guitar
- Laurence Juber – guitar
- Al Petteway – guitar
- Doug Smith – guitar
- Amrit Sond – guitar
- Aaron Stang – guitar
