= Edward Gerhard =

American guitarist

Ed Gerhard
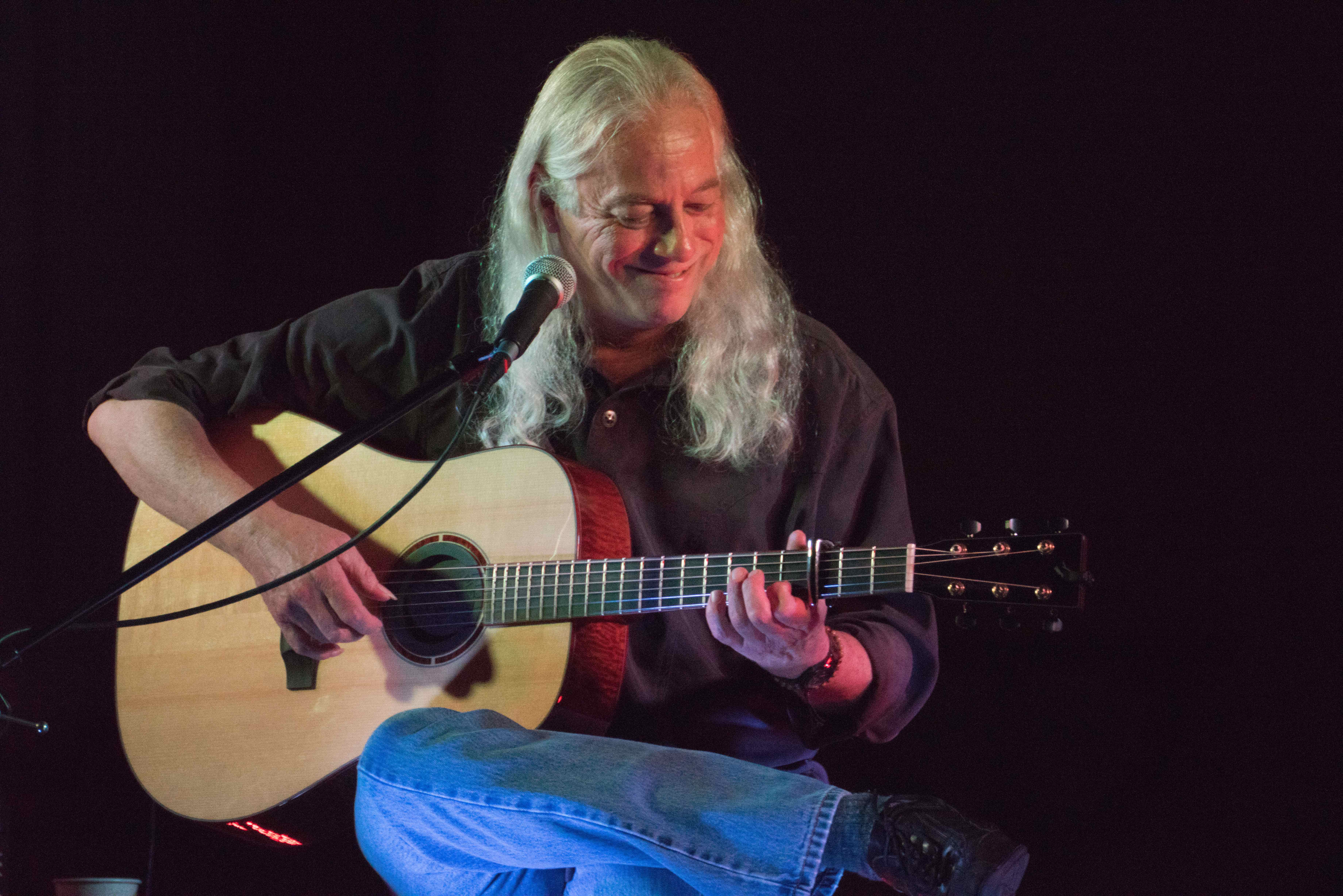
- Gerhard playing a Breedlove dreadnought guitar at the Canadian Guitar Festival in 2014

Background information
- Born: Abington, Pennsylvania, U.S.
- Genre: New Age
- Occupation: Musician
- Instrument: Guitar
- Years active: 1980s–present
- Label: Virtue
- Website: www.virtuerecords.com

Ed Gerhard is an American Grammy Award winning guitarist. He is known for his acoustic fingerstyle guitar playing and lap steel guitar music.

== Career ==
Gerhard was born in Abington, Pennsylvania. He started playing guitar when he was fourteen, inspired by seeing classical guitarist Andrés Segovia on television. He was also influenced by the open tunings of folk guitarist John Fahey.

In 1987 Gerhard released his debut solo album, Night Birds. He established Virtue Records in 1991 as a record label for his work and for instrumental acoustic guitar music.

In December 1982, he began performing an annual concert in Portsmouth, New Hampshire.

He received a Grammy Award for his participation in the album Henry Mancini: Pink Guitar (Solid Air, 2004), for which he arranged and performed "Moon River".

In 2012, after six years of work, Gerhard release the album There and Gone.

== Signature guitar ==
In 1997, Breedlove Guitars released the Ed Gerhard Signature Model Guitar. The guitar became one of Breedlove's best-selling guitars and won the Player's Choice Award by Acoustic Guitar magazine in 2000.

In collaboration with Gerhard, Breedlove also released a Weissenborn guitar in which traditional design is combined with modern features and contemporary wood combinations.

== Discography ==
- 1987 Nightbirds
- 1991 Christmas
- 1993 Luna
- 1996 Counting the Ways
- 1997 On a Cold Winter's Night
- 1999 The Live Album
- 2006 Sunnyland (Solid Air)
- 2006 House of Guitars
- 2012 There and Gone

On soundtracks

- 2001 Mark Twain, Ken Burns
- 2005 Le Vie Di Sempre, Ivano Ponzini (Italy)
- 2009 The National Parks: America's Best Idea, Ken Burns

As guest

- 1986 Bill Morrissey, North (Philo)
- 1992 Arlo Guthrie, Son of the Wind (Rising Son)
- 1996 Arlo Guthrie, Mystic Journey (Rising Son)
- 2007 Jorma Kaukonen, Stars in My Crown (Red House)

=== Video ===
- 1996 All-Star Guitar Night (Homespun)
- 2003 Ed Gerhard Solo Guitar Performance (Rittor)
- 2007 A Fingerstyle Summit with Martin Simpson and Adrian Legg (Alfred Publishing)

== Books ==
- 1994 "The Handing Down" featured in Windham Hill Guitar Sampler; 18 Transcriptions from the Modern Masters of the Acoustic Guitar (Hal Leonard)
- 1996 Ed Gerhard: Selections from Night Birds & Luna (Mel Bay/Virtue Records Publishing)
- 1996 Gerhard's arrangement of "O Holy Night" featured in Portraits of Christmas (Mel Bay)
- 2003 Gerhard featured in Andy Volk's "Lap Steel Guitar" (Centerstream Publications)
- 2004 Ed Gerhard; The Guitar Songbook (Warner Bros.)
- 2004 Gerhard's arrangement of "Moon River" featured in Henry Mancini: Pink Guitar (Warner Brothers/Alfred)
- 2009 Songs & Pieces for Guitar (Virtue Records Publishing), six compositions from Sunnyland and five from previous albums
