= Duncan Johnstone =

Scottish musician (1925–1999)

- Born: 25 July 1925; Glasgow, Scotland
- Died: 2 November 1999 (aged 74)
- Instrument: Great Highland Bagpipe

Duncan Johnstone (25 July 1925 – 14 November 1999) was a Scottish bagpiper and composer.

He was born in Glasgow, Scotland. His parents were Alexander Johnstone (born MacMillan) from Benbecula and his mother Kate MacMillan from Craigston, Barra. His mother was the sister of Father John MacMillan of Barra for whom the 2/4 march piping tune was named. Upon leaving school, he was apprenticed as a cabinetmaker. During World War II, Duncan served with the Submarine Surveillance Mine Sweeping Service in the Mediterranean and Aegean Seas. On his return from the war, he became a joiner for the Clan Line and Stephen shipyards, whilst taking piping lessons in his free time. He was the first piper to win the Scottish Pipers' Association Knockout Competition in 1964.

In 1974, he moved on to be a bagpipe instructor full-time at the College of Piping in Otago Street, Glasgow; a position he held until 1978 when, he founded his own piping school in Robertson Street. Duncan taught Finlay MacDonald (musician), one of the first pipers to receive a BA in Scottish Music from the Royal Scottish Academy of Music and Drama.

He published three books of traditional and modern pipe music and three solo albums. He was awarded the Balvenie Medal by Messrs Wm Grant & Son in 1996 for his piping achievements.

After his death the Duncan Johnstone Memorial Competition was set up by the National Piping Centre.
