= William Jackson (Scottish composer) =

Scottish harpist and composer

William Jackson (born 14 September 1955) is a Scottish harpist and composer.

William Jackson was born in Cambuslang, near Glasgow. As his grandparents came from County Donegal, he visited Ireland many times, throughout his childhood, and still has a home there. He trained as a music therapist at the Guildhall School of Music in 1992/93, and from 1998 - 2009 he headed the Music therapy department at Mission Children's Hospital in Asheville, North Carolina. In 1969 he formed the Scottish folk group Contraband, who released an album in 1974, then disbanded in 1975. Jackson's brother George (died 1998) was also a member. He became a founding member of Ossian in 1976. He has lived in Ireland since 2009 and works as a music therapist there, while also continuing his concert and teaching work in the US for part of the year.

Ossian disbanded in about 1989, and he continued as a solo artist both as a performer and composer. He became one of the first to compose using both traditional and classical musicians, and his "Wellpark Suite" in 1985 was generally acclaimed as a milestone in Scottish music. From 1989 William Jackson released a series of albums on his own label Mill Records, sometimes using ancient texts, and on one occasion a poem by Kahlil Gibran. In 1996, A Scottish Island was commissioned by the Scottish Chamber Orchestra. In 1999 he wrote Land of Light and won the Song for Scotland competition with this song. It was performed at Edinburgh Castle on 27 July 2000, and was featured at the 2000 Edinburgh Tattoo. He arranged and performed the music for Battle of the Clans, a documentary on The History Channel. As a producer, he has worked with several singers on the anthology Celtic Woman. Duan Àlbanach was recorded with the Scottish Festival Orchestra, recorded live in 2002, but not released until 2003.

== Discography ==
=== Solo ===
- The Wellpark Suite (1985)
- Heart Music (1987)
- St Mungo: A Celtic Suite For Glasgow (1990)
- Celtic Tranquility (1992)
- Inchcolm (1995; reissued 2007)
- The Ancient Harp of Scotland (1998)
- A Scottish Island (1998)
- Celtic Experience vol. 1: Haunting Themes From Scotland and Ireland (1997)
- Celtic Experience vol. 2: Haunting Themes From Scotland and Ireland (1998)
- Celtic Experience vol. 3: Haunting Themes From Scotland and Ireland (1999)
- Celtic Experience: Haunting Themes From Scotland and Ireland (2000) (A box set of the above three albums)
- The Celtic Suites (1999) (A compilation of The Wellpark Suite and St Mungo)
- Land of Light (1999)
- Notes From A Hebridean Island (2001) (with Mackenzie)
- Duan Àlbanach (2003)
- The New Harp (2008)
- Music From Ireland and Scotland (2009) (with Gráinne Hambly)

=== With Ossian ===
- Ossian (1977)
- St. Kilda Wedding (1978)
- Seal Song (1980)
- Dove Across the Water (1981)
- Borders (1983)
- Light on a Distant Shore (1986)
- The Best of Ossian (1993)
- The Carrying Stream (1997)

=== With Contraband ===
(as Billy Jackson)

- Contraband (1974)

=== Anthologies ===
- Celtic Legacy (1995)
- Celtic Spirit (1996)
- Celtic Chillout (2002)
